= 2024 Colorado House of Representatives election =

- November 5, 2024

All 65 seats in the Colorado House of Representatives 33 seats needed for a majority

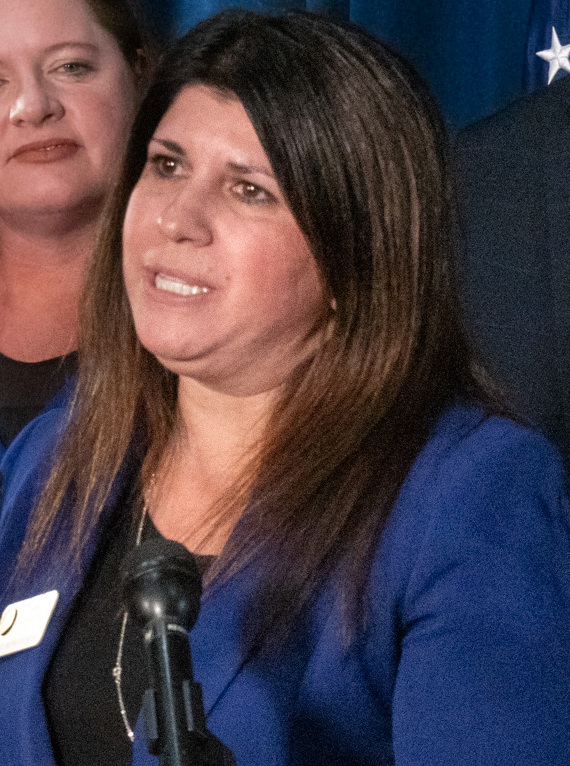
	Majority party	Minority party
Leader	Julie McCluskie	Rose Pugliese
Party	Democratic	Republican
Leader since	January 9, 2023	January 24, 2024
Leader's seat	13th–Boulder	14th–Colorado Springs
Last election	46 seats, 53.33%	19 seats, 45.85%
Seats before	46	19
Seats after	43	22
Seat change	▼3	▲3
Popular vote	1,563,201	1,313,093
Percentage	53.67%	45.09%
Swing	▲0.34 pp	▼0.76 pp
- Republican gain Democratic hold Republican hold 50–60% 60–70% 70–80% 80–90% >90% 50–60% 60–70% 70–80% >90%
Speaker before election
Julie McCluskie
Democratic
Elected Speaker
Julie McCluskie
Democratic

The 2024 Colorado House of Representatives elections took place on November 5, 2024, with the primaries being held on June 25, 2024.

== Background ==
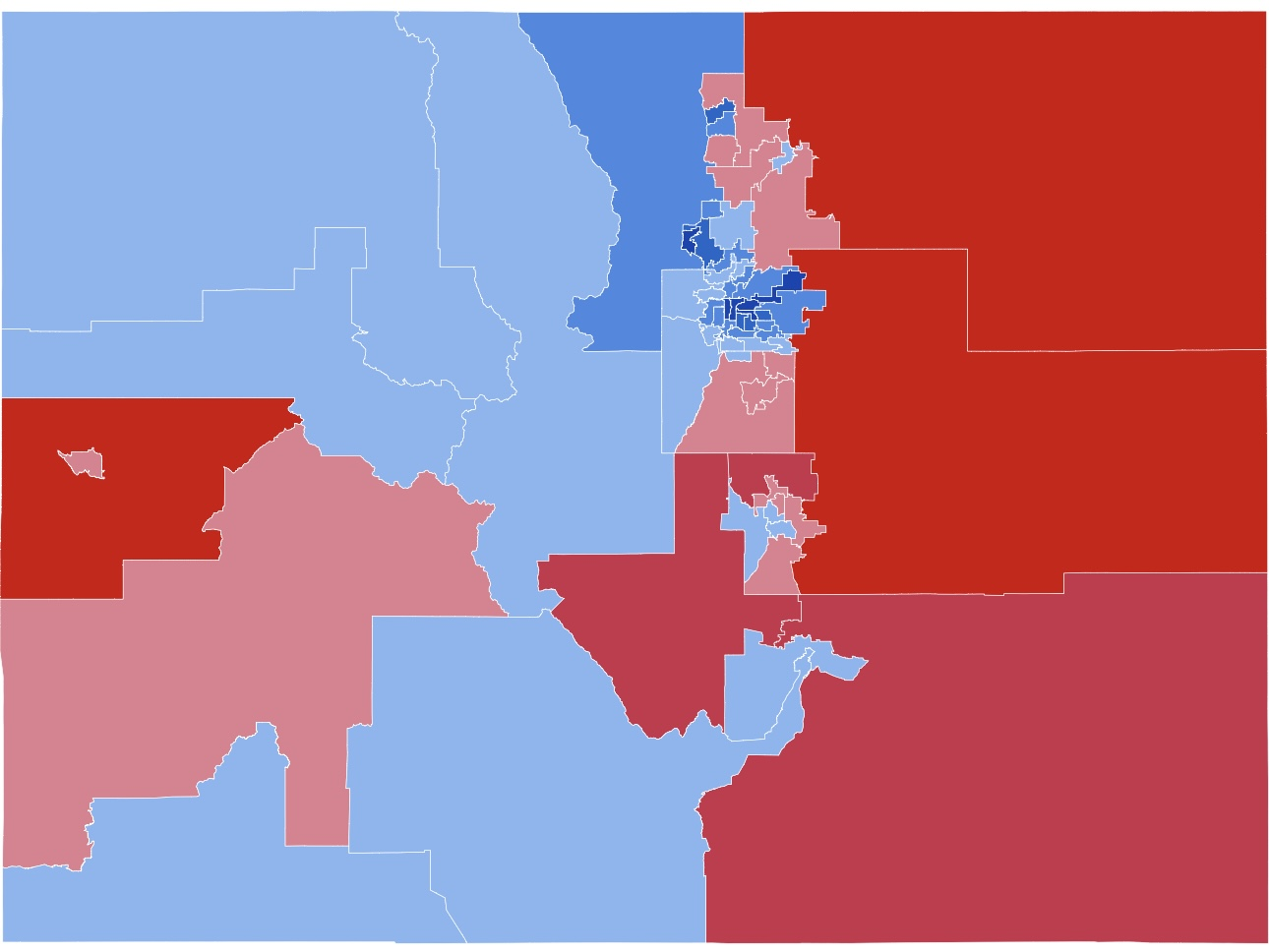
Biden 50–60% 60–70% 70–80% 80-90% / Trump 50–60% 60–70% 70–80%

In the 2020 US Presidential Election, Joe Biden won 46 districts, while Donald Trump won 19. At the previous election in 2022, the Democratic Party increased their majority by 5 seats with a total of 46 seats compared to the 19 seats held by the Republican Party.

== Retirements ==
=== Democrats ===
- District 8: Leslie Herod was term-limited.
- District 18: Marc Snyder retired to run for State Senate.
- District 19: Jennifer Parenti quit the race in July 2024 after winning the Democratic primary. A vacancy committee selected Jillaire McMillan to replace her.
- District 24: Lindsey Daugherty retired to run for State Senate.
- District 30: Chris Kennedy was term-limited.
- District 36: Mike Weissman was term-limited (ran for State Senate).
- District 38: David Ortiz retired.
- District 49: Judy Amabile retired to run for State Senate.
- District 52: Cathy Kipp retired to run for State Senate.
- District 59: Barbara McLachlan was term-limited.

=== Republicans ===
- District 20: Don Wilson retired to run for El Paso County Commission.
- District 45: Lisa Frizell retired to run for State Senate.
- District 48: Gabe Evans retired to run for U.S. House.
- District 56: Rod Bockenfeld retired.
- District 58: Marc Catlin was term-limited (ran for State Senate).
- District 63: Richard Holtorf retired to run for U.S. House.
- District 65: Mike Lynch retired to run for U.S. House.

== Incumbents defeated ==
=== In primary election ===
Three incumbent representatives, all Democrats, were defeated in the June 25 primary election:

- District 4: Tim Hernández lost nomination to a full term to Cecelia Espenoza.
- District 6: Elisabeth Epps lost renomination to Sean Camacho.
- District 31: Julia Marvin lost nomination to a full term to Jacqueline Phillips.

=== General election ===
- District 16: Democrat Stephanie Vigil was defeated by Republican Rebecca Keltie.
- District 50: Democrat Mary Young was defeated by Republican Ryan Gonzalez.

== Predictions ==
Source	Ranking	As of
CNalysis	Solid D	August 10, 2024
Sabato's Crystal Ball	Safe D	June 18, 2024

== Closest races ==
Seats where the margin of victory was under 10%:

1. District 16, R +0.008% gain
2. District 19, R +0.2% gain
3. District 50, R +2.18% gain
4. District 59, D +2.42%
5. District 43, D +2.52%
6. District 25, D +4.22%
7. District 46, D +4.56%
8. District 51, R +5.24%
9. District 28, D +5.68%
10. District 34, D +5.85%
11. District 18, D +7.06%
12. District 62, D +7.52%
13. District 38, D +9.14%
14. District 58, R +9.18%

== Results overview ==
District	Incumbent	Party	Elected	Party
1	Javier Mabrey	Dem	Javier Mabrey	Dem
2	Steven Woodrow	Dem	Steven Woodrow	Dem
3	Meg Froelich	Dem	Meg Froelich	Dem
4	Tim Hernández	Dem	Cecelia Espenoza	Dem
5	Crisanta Duran	Dem	Alex Valdez	Dem
6	Elisabeth Epps	Dem	Alex Valdez	Dem
7	Jennifer Bacon	Dem	Jennifer Bacon	Dem
8	Leslie Herod	Dem	Lindsay Gilchrist	Dem
9				
10				
11				
12				
13				
14				
15				
16				
17				
18				
19				
20				
21				
22				
23				
24				
25				
26				
27				
28				
29				
30				
31				
32				
33				
34				
35				
36				
37				
38				
39				
40				
41				
42				
43				
44				
45				
46				
47				
48				
49				
50				
51				
52				
53				
54				
55				
56				
57				
58				
59				
60				
61				
62				
63				
64				
65				

== Results by district ==
=== District 1 ===
2024 Colorado House of Representatives election, 1st District
Party	Candidate	Votes	%
Democratic	Javier Mabrey (incumbent)	22,104	64.75%
Republican	Barbara DeHaan	12,033	35.25%
Total votes		34,137	100%
Democratic hold			

=== District 2 ===
2024 Colorado House of Representatives election, 2nd District
Party	Candidate	Votes	%
Democratic	Steven Woodrow (incumbent)	38,829	74.20%
Republican	Michael DiManna	13,501	25.80%
Total votes		52,330	100%
Democratic hold			

=== District 3 ===
2024 Colorado House of Representatives election, 3rd District
Party	Candidate	Votes	%
Democratic	Meg Froelich (incumbent)	26,049	64.03%
Republican	Mickey Neal	14,619	35.94%
Republican	Marla Fernandez (write-in)	14	0.03%
Total votes		40,682	100%
Democratic hold			

=== District 4 ===
2024 Colorado House of Representatives election, 4th District
Party	Candidate	Votes	%
Democratic	Cecelia Espenoza	32,315	78.94%
Republican	Jack Daus	8,623	21.06%
Total votes		40,938	100%
Democratic hold			

=== District 5 ===
2024 Colorado House of Representatives election, 5th District
Party	Candidate	Votes	%
Democratic	Alex Valdez (incumbent)	32,077	79.59%
Republican	Johnnie Wesley Johnson	8,224	20.41%
Total votes		40,301	100%
Democratic hold			

=== District 6 ===
2024 Colorado House of Representatives election, 6th District
Party	Candidate	Votes	%
Democratic	Sean Camacho	38,250	84.57%
Republican	Kyle Witter	6,978	15.43%
Total votes		45,228	100%
Democratic hold			

=== District 7 ===
2024 Colorado House of Representatives election, 7th District
Party	Candidate	Votes	%
Democratic	Jennifer Bacon (incumbent)	22,078	73.11%
Republican	Tom Swift	7,206	23.86%
Libertarian	Raymon Anthony Doane	907	3.00%
Democratic	Ben Pope (write-in)	9	0.03%
Total votes		30,200	100%
Democratic hold			

=== District 8 ===
2024 Colorado House of Representatives election, 8th District
Party	Candidate	Votes	%
Democratic	Lindsay Gilchrist	39,914	85.16%
Republican	Philip Borrelli	5,932	12.66%
Unity	Jesse Lashawn Parris	992	2.12%
Democratic	Sharron Pettiford (write-in)	33	0.07%
Total votes		46,871	100%
Democratic hold			

=== District 9 ===
2024 Colorado House of Representatives election, 9th District
Party	Candidate	Votes	%
Democratic	Emily Sirota (incumbent)	29,530	74.50%
Republican	Tom Cowhick	10,108	25.50%
Total votes		39,638	100%
Democratic hold			

=== District 10 ===
2024 Colorado House of Representatives election, 10th District
Party	Candidate	Votes	%
Democratic	Junie Joseph (incumbent)	33,889	84.35%
Republican	William DeOreo	6,290	15.65%
Total votes		40,179	100%
Democratic hold			

=== District 11 ===
2024 Colorado House of Representatives election, 11th District
Party	Candidate	Votes	%
Democratic	Karen McCormick (incumbent)	31,650	69.32%
Republican	Kathy Reeves	14,005	30.68%
Total votes		45,655	100%
Democratic hold			

=== District 12 ===
2024 Colorado House of Representatives election, 12th District
Party	Candidate	Votes	%
Democratic	Kyle Brown (incumbent)	39,742	76.56%
Republican	Mark Milliman	12,166	23.44%
Total votes		51,908	100%
Democratic hold			

=== District 13 ===
2024 Colorado House of Representatives election, 13th District
Party	Candidate	Votes	%
Democratic	Julie McCluskie (incumbent)	30,291	55.17%
Republican	Dave Williams	24,613	44.83%
Total votes		24,613	100%
Democratic hold			

=== District 14 ===
2024 Colorado House of Representatives election, 14th District
Party	Candidate	Votes	%
Republican	Rose Pugliese (incumbent)	34,428	60.69%
Democratic	Kat Gayle	22,301	39.31%
Total votes		56,729	100%
Republican hold			

=== District 15 ===
2024 Colorado House of Representatives election, 15th District
Party	Candidate	Votes	%
Republican	Scott Bottoms (incumbent)	26,519	57.99%
Democratic	Jeff Livingston	19,215	42.01%
Total votes		45,734	100%
Republican hold			

=== District 16 ===
2024 Colorado House of Representatives election, 16th District
Party	Candidate	Votes	%
Republican	Rebecca Keltie	20,641	50.004%
Democratic	Stephanie Vigil (incumbent)	20,638	49.996%
Total votes		41,279	100%
Republican gain from Democratic			

=== District 17 ===
2024 Colorado House of Representatives election, 17th District
Party	Candidate	Votes	%
Democratic	Regina English (incumbent)	14,461	55.87%
Republican	Elizabeth Riggs	11,423	44.13%
Total votes		25,884	100%
Democratic hold			

=== District 18 ===
2024 Colorado House of Representatives election, 18th District
Party	Candidate	Votes	%
Democratic	Amy Paschal	24,780	53.53%
Republican	James Boelens Jr	21,510	46.47%
Total votes		46,290	100%
Democratic hold			

=== District 19 ===
2024 Colorado House of Representatives election, 19th District
Party	Candidate	Votes	%
Republican	Dan Woog	28,420	50.10%
Democratic	Jillaire McMillan	28,310	49.90%
Total votes		56,730	100%
Republican gain from Democratic			

=== District 20 ===
2024 Colorado House of Representatives election, 20th District
Party	Candidate	Votes	%
Republican	Jarvis Caldwell	39,949	71.94%
Democratic	Arik Dougherty	15,581	28.06%
Total votes		55,530	100%
Republican hold			

=== District 21 ===
2024 Colorado House of Representatives election, 21st District
Party	Candidate	Votes	%
Republican	Mary Bradfield (incumbent)	17,631	58.23%
Democratic	Liz Rosenbaum	12,646	41.77%
Total votes		30,277	100%
Republican hold			

=== District 22 ===
2024 Colorado House of Representatives election, 22nd District
Party	Candidate	Votes	%
Republican	Ken DeGraaf (incumbent)	25,890	56.62%
Democratic	Michael Pierson	17,665	38.63%
Independent	Daniel Campaña	2,170	4.75%
Total votes		45,725	100%
Republican hold			

=== District 23 ===
2024 Colorado House of Representatives election, 23rd District
Party	Candidate	Votes	%
Democratic	Monica Duran (incumbent)	31,854	63.80%
Republican	Cory Ohnesorge	18,073	36.20%
Total votes		49,927	100%
Democratic hold			

=== District 24 ===
2024 Colorado House of Representatives election, 24th District
Party	Candidate	Votes	%
Democratic	Lisa Feret	30,249	56.64%
Republican	Gwen Henderson	23,161	43.36%
Total votes		53,410	100%
Democratic hold			

=== District 25 ===
2024 Colorado House of Representatives election, 25th District
Party	Candidate	Votes	%
Democratic	Tammy Story (incumbent)	31,327	52.11%
Republican	George Mumma Jr	28,790	47.89%
Total votes		60,117	100%
Democratic hold			

=== District 26 ===
2024 Colorado House of Representatives election, 26th District
Party	Candidate	Votes	%
Democratic	Meghan Lukens (incumbent)	27,188	56.62%
Republican	Nathan Butler	20,831	43.38%
Total votes		48,019	100%
Democratic hold			

=== District 27 ===
2024 Colorado House of Representatives election, 27th District
Party	Candidate	Votes	%
Democratic	Brianna Titone (incumbent)	30,193	56.79%
Republican	Ed Cox	22,976	43.21%
Total votes		53,169	100%
Democratic hold			

=== District 28 ===
2024 Colorado House of Representatives election, 28th District
Party	Candidate	Votes	%
Democratic	Sheila Lieder (incumbent)	26,960	52.84%
Republican	Peter Boddie	24,066	47.16%
Total votes		51,026	100%
Democratic hold			

=== District 29 ===
2024 Colorado House of Representatives election, 29th District
Party	Candidate	Votes	%
Democratic	Shannon Bird (incumbent)	30,163	60.85%
Republican	Evan Shields Hunt	19,409	39.15%
Total votes		49,572	100%
Democratic hold			

=== District 30 ===
2024 Colorado House of Representatives election, 30th District
Party	Candidate	Votes	%
Democratic	Rebekah Stewart	26,647	62.25%
Republican	Ramey Johnson	16,162	37.75%
Total votes		42,809	100%
Democratic hold			

=== District 31 ===
2024 Colorado House of Representatives election, 31st District
Party	Candidate	Votes	%
Democratic	Jacque Phillips	17,221	55.86%
Republican	Heidi Pitchforth	13,609	44.14%
Total votes		30,830	100%
Democratic hold			

=== District 32 ===
2024 Colorado House of Representatives election, 32nd District
Party	Candidate	Votes	%
Democratic	Manny Rutinel (incumbent)	22,853	100%
Total votes		22,853	100%
Democratic hold			

=== District 33 ===
2024 Colorado House of Representatives election, 33rd District
Party	Candidate	Votes	%
Democratic	William Lindstedt (incumbent)	31,589	58.58%
Republican	Michael Martinez	22,332	41.42%
Total votes		53,921	100%
Democratic hold			

=== District 34 ===
2024 Colorado House of Representatives election, 34th District
Party	Candidate	Votes	%
Democratic	Jenny Willford (incumbent)	21,326	50.64%
Republican	Craig Sullivan	18,864	44.79%
Center	Alexander "Skinny" Winkler	971	2.31%
Independent	Mark Bromley	952	2.26%
Total votes		42,113	100%
Democratic hold			

=== District 35 ===
2024 Colorado House of Representatives election, 35th District
Party	Candidate	Votes	%
Democratic	Lorena Garcia (incumbent)	19,526	64.62%
Republican	Lee Knoll	10,689	35.38%
Total votes		30,215	100%
Democratic hold			

=== District 36 ===
2024 Colorado House of Representatives election, 36th District
Party	Candidate	Votes	%
Democratic	Michael Carter	21,452	71.54%
Forward	Eric Mulder	8,532	28.46%
Total votes		29,984	100%
Democratic hold			

=== District 37 ===
2024 Colorado House of Representatives election, 37th District
Party	Candidate	Votes	%
Democratic	Chad Clifford (incumbent)	31,463	97.34%
Independent	Kevin Biehl (write-in)	861	2.66%
Total votes		32,324	100%
Democratic hold			

=== District 38 ===
2024 Colorado House of Representatives election, 38th District
Party	Candidate	Votes	%
Democratic	Gretchen Rydin	29,577	54.57%
Republican	Jeffrey Patty	24,623	45.43%
Total votes		54,200	100%
Democratic hold			

=== District 39 ===
2024 Colorado House of Representatives election, 39th District
Party	Candidate	Votes	%
Republican	Brandi Bradley (incumbent)	36,364	58.97%
Democratic	Eric Brody	25,305	41.03%
Total votes		61,669	100%
Republican hold			

=== District 40 ===
2024 Colorado House of Representatives election, 40th District
Party	Candidate	Votes	%
Democratic	Naquetta Ricks (incumbent)	24,086	56.59%
Republican	Darryl Gibbs	17,034	40.02%
Libertarian	Allison Spink	1,446	3.40%
Total votes		42,566	100%
Democratic hold			

=== District 41 ===
2024 Colorado House of Representatives election, 41st District
Party	Candidate	Votes	%
Democratic	Iman Jodeh (incumbent)	22,124	61.30%
Republican	Rob McKenna	12,736	35.29%
Libertarian	Keith Porter	1,231	3.41%
Total votes		36,091	100%
Democratic hold			

=== District 42 ===
2024 Colorado House of Representatives election, 42th District
Party	Candidate	Votes	%
Democratic	Mandy Lindsay (incumbent)	18,097	100%
Total votes		18,097	100%
Democratic hold			

=== District 43 ===
2024 Colorado House of Representatives election, 43th District
Party	Candidate	Votes	%
Democratic	Bob Marshall (incumbent)	27,915	51.26%
Republican	Matt Burcham	26,542	48.74%
Total votes		54,457	100%
Democratic hold			

=== District 44 ===
2024 Colorado House of Representatives election, 44th District
Party	Candidate	Votes	%
Republican	Anthony Hartsook (incumbent)	30,957	58.64%
Democratic	Alyssa Nilemo	21,833	41.36%
Total votes		52,790	100%
Republican hold			

=== District 45 ===
2024 Colorado House of Representatives election, 45th District
Party	Candidate	Votes	%
Republican	Max Brooks	35,970	62.26%
Democratic	Chad Cox	21,801	37.74%
Total votes		57,771	100%
Republican hold			

=== District 46 ===
2024 Colorado House of Representatives election, 46th District
Party	Candidate	Votes	%
Democratic	Tisha Mauro (incumbent)	23,823	52.28%
Republican	Kim Swearingen	21,746	47.72%
Total votes		45,569	100%
Democratic hold			

=== District 47 ===
2024 Colorado House of Representatives election, 47th District
Party	Candidate	Votes	%
Republican	Ty Winter (incumbent)	29,899	67.22%
Democratic	Elizabeth Bulthuis	14,580	32.78%
Total votes		44,479	100%
Republican hold			

=== District 48 ===
2024 Colorado House of Representatives election, 48th District
Party	Candidate	Votes	%
Republican	Carlos Barron	32,520	100%
Total votes		32,520	100%
Republican hold			

=== District 49 ===
2024 Colorado House of Representatives election, 49th District
Party	Candidate	Votes	%
Democratic	Lesley Smith	36,669	63.81%
Republican	Steve Ferrante	20,797	36.19%
Total votes		57,466	100%
Democratic hold			

=== District 50 ===
2024 Colorado House of Representatives election, 50th District
Party	Candidate	Votes	%
Republican	Ryan Gonzalez	13,233	51.09%
Democratic	Mary Young (incumbent)	12,670	48.91%
Total votes		25,903	100%
Republican gain from Democratic			

=== District 51 ===
2024 Colorado House of Representatives election, 51st District
Party	Candidate	Votes	%
Republican	Ron Weinberg (incumbent)	28,460	52.62%
Democratic	Sarah McKeen	25,628	47.38%
Total votes		54,088	100%
Republican hold			

=== District 52 ===
2024 Colorado House of Representatives election, 52nd District
Party	Candidate	Votes	%
Democratic	Yara Zokaie	31,167	63.28%
Center	Steve Yurash	18,088	36.72%
Total votes		49,255	100%
Democratic hold			

=== District 53 ===
2024 Colorado House of Representatives election, 53rd District
Party	Candidate	Votes	%
Democratic	Andrew Boesenecker (incumbent)	31,875	73.52%
Republican	Donna Walter	11,479	26.48%
Total votes		43,354	100%
Democratic hold			

=== District 54 ===
2024 Colorado House of Representatives election, 54th District
Party	Candidate	Votes	%
Republican	Matt Soper (incumbent)	41,811	100%
Total votes		41,811	100%
Republican hold			

=== District 55 ===
2024 Colorado House of Representatives election, 55th District
Party	Candidate	Votes	%
Republican	Rick Taggart (incumbent)	36,085	100%
Total votes		36,085	100%
Republican hold			

=== District 56 ===
2024 Colorado House of Representatives election, 56th District
Party	Candidate	Votes	%
Republican	Chris Richardson	42,014	75.72%
Democratic	Alessandra Navetta	13,475	24.28%
Total votes		55,489	100%
Republican hold			

=== District 57 ===
2024 Colorado House of Representatives election, 57th District
Party	Candidate	Votes	%
Democratic	Elizabeth Velasco (incumbent)	24,604	55.79%
Republican	Caleb Waller	19,494	44.21%
Total votes		44,098	100%
Democratic hold			

=== District 58 ===
2024 Colorado House of Representatives election, 58th District
Party	Candidate	Votes	%
Republican	Larry Don Suckla	30,170	54.59%
Democratic	Kathleen Curry	25,100	45.41%
Total votes		55,270	100%
Republican hold			

=== District 59 ===
2024 Colorado House of Representatives election, 59th District
Party	Candidate	Votes	%
Democratic	Katie Stewart	27,918	51.21%
Republican	Clark Craig	26,599	48.79%
Total votes		54,517	100%
Democratic hold			

=== District 60 ===
2024 Colorado House of Representatives election, 60th District
Party	Candidate	Votes	%
Republican	Stephanie Luck (incumbent)	36,518	69.77%
Democratic	Kathryn Green	15,826	30.23%
Total votes		52,344	100%
Republican hold			

=== District 61 ===
2024 Colorado House of Representatives election, 61st District
Party	Candidate	Votes	%
Democratic	Eliza Hamrick (incumbent)	32,799	100%
Total votes		32,799	100%
Democratic hold			

=== District 62 ===
2024 Colorado House of Representatives election, 62nd District
Party	Candidate	Votes	%
Democratic	Matthew Martinez (incumbent)	21,050	53.76%
Republican	Carol Riggenbach	18,109	46.24%
Total votes		39,159	100%
Democratic hold			

=== District 63 ===
2024 Colorado House of Representatives election, 63rd District
Party	Candidate	Votes	%
Republican	Dusty A. Johnson	36,930	100%
Total votes		36,930	100%
Republican hold			

=== District 64 ===
2024 Colorado House of Representatives election, 64th District
Party	Candidate	Votes	%
Republican	Ryan Armagost (incumbent)	34,463	63.50%
Democratic	Mark Matthews	19,810	36.50%
Total votes		54,273	100%
Republican hold			

=== District 65 ===
2024 Colorado House of Representatives election, 65th District
Party	Candidate	Votes	%
Republican	Lori Garcia Sander	38,882	62.73%
Democratic	Will Walters	23,101	37.27%
Total votes		61,983	100%
Republican hold			
