= 2024 Colorado Amendment 80 =

Proposed amendment to the Colorado Constitution

Amendment 80
- November 5, 2024
- Constitutional Right to School Choice

Results
Choice	Votes	%
Yes	1,507,236	49.32%
No	1,548,679	50.68%
Total votes	3,055,915	100.00%

For
60–70%
50–60%
Against
60–70%
50–60%

Colorado Amendment 80 was a proposed amendment to the Colorado Constitution that appeared on the general election ballot on November 5, 2024. If passed, the amendment would have added a provision to the state's Constitution guaranteeing the right to school choice. The measure must have been approved by at least 55% of voters to pass.

== Background ==
Currently, K-12 students in Colorado have the options of attending public, charter, private, online, or neighborhood schools as well as homeschooling. Students can also use the state's open enrollment process to attend public schools in school districts they do not live in for free. This has been the case since 1994, when open enrollment was implemented by state law.

Amendment 80 was referred to the ballot by a citizen initiated petition. Both petitioning for the measure and the campaign in favor were led by the conservative group Advance Colorado Action. The group is also behind Proposition 128 and Proposition 130. Some supporters claim this amendment would simply move the existing school options in Colorado from state statute to the state Constitution. Many opponents argued Amendment 80 would create a school voucher system in Colorado and take funding away from public schools.

== Contents ==
The amendment appeared on the ballot as follows:

Shall there be an amendment to the Colorado constitution establishing the right to school choice for children in kindergarten through 12th grade, and, in connection therewith, declaring that school choice includes neighborhood, charter, and private schools; home schooling; open enrollment options; and future innovations in education?

== Campaigns ==
=== Support ===
Support for Amendment 80 was led by the group School Choice For Every Child. Colorado's official voter guide also offers the arguments for the measure that it should be a parent's right to choose whatever school they see fit for their child, whether public or private, and that Amendment 80 would protect parents and children by putting that right into the Colorado Constitution.

'Yes'

State senators

- Paul Lundeen

State representatives

- Rose Pugliese

=== Opposition ===
Opposition to Amendment 80 was led by the group Public Schools Strong. The state's official voter guide offered the arguments against the amendment that Colorado already offers free public education, the language of the amendment is unclear, and it would lead to public funds being put into private schools.

'No'

State officials

- Dave Young, Treasurer of Colorado

State senators

- Jeff Bridges
- Janet Buckner
- James Coleman
- Lisa Cutter
- Jessie Danielson
- Tony Exum
- Steve Fenberg
- Rhonda Fields
- Julie Gonzales
- Chris Hansen
- Nick Hinrichsen
- Chris Kolker
- Sonya Jaquez Lewis
- Janice Marchman
- Dylan Roberts
- Robert Rodriguez
- Faith Winter
- Rachel Zenzinger

State representatives

- Judy Amabile
- Jennifer Bacon
- Shannon Bird
- Andrew Boesenecker
- Chad Clifford
- Lindsey Daugherty
- Monica Duran
- Meg Froelich
- Lorena Garcia
- Eliza Hamrick
- Tim Hernández
- Iman Jodeh
- Chris Kennedy
- Cathy Kipp
- Sheila Lieder
- William Lindstedt
- Meghan Lukens
- Javier Mabrey
- Matthew Martinez
- Julia Marvin
- Tisha Mauro
- Julie McCluskie
- Karen McCormick
- Barbara McLachlan
- Jennifer Parenti
- Manny Rutinel
- Emily Sirota
- Marc Snyder
- Tammy Story
- Brianna Titone
- Elizabeth Velasco
- Stephanie Vigil
- Mike Weissman
- Jenny Willford
- Steven Woodrow
- Mary Young

Organizations

- AAUW of Colorado
- ACLU of Colorado
- AFSCME
- Americans United for Separation of Church and State
- Colorado AFL-CIO
- Colorado Democratic Party
- Colorado Education Association
- Colorado Working Families Party
- League of Women Voters Colorado
- Stand for Children

== Results ==
Amendment 80 required a 55% majority to pass. It failed, receiving just under 50% of the vote.

Amendment 80
Choice	Votes	%
For	1,507,236	49.32
Against	1,548,679	50.68
Total	3,055,915	100.00

=== Results by county ===
County	For		Against		Margin		Total votes cast
County	#	%	#	%	#	%	Total votes cast
Adams	118,427	54.23%	99,932	45.77%	18,495	8.47%	218,359
Alamosa	3,732	53.15%	3,289	46.85%	443	6.31%	7,021
Arapahoe	153,143	49.00%	159,412	51.00%	-6,269	-2.01%	312,555
Archuleta	5,181	58.46%	3,682	41.54%	1,499	16.91%	8,863
Baca	898	46.84%	1,019	53.16%	-121	-6.31%	1,917
Bent	1,020	48.14%	1,099	51.86%	-79	-3.73%	2,119
Boulder	66,866	35.92%	119,273	64.08%	-52,407	-28.15%	186,139
Broomfield	19,908	44.31%	25,023	55.69%	-5,115	-11.38%	44,931
Chaffee	6,523	46.97%	7,364	53.03%	-841	-6.06%	13,887
Cheyenne	516	50.34%	509	49.66%	7	0.68%	1,025
Clear Creek	2,788	48.12%	3,006	51.88%	-218	-3.76%	5,794
Conejos	1,941	49.06%	2,015	50.94%	-74	-1.87%	3,956
Costilla	1,070	55.30%	865	44.70%	205	10.59%	1,935
Crowley	897	53.87%	768	46.13%	129	7.75%	1,665
Custer	2,255	60.01%	1,503	39.99%	752	20.01%	3,758
Delta	11,483	61.01%	7,338	38.99%	4,145	22.02%	18,821
Denver	137,100	39.93%	206,285	60.07%	-69,185	-20.15%	343,385
Dolores	782	58.49%	555	41.51%	227	16.98%	1,337
Douglas	113,118	48.22%	121,454	51.78%	-8,336	-3.55%	234,572
Eagle	13,046	49.85%	13,126	50.15%	-80	-0.31%	26,172
El Paso	207,203	56.29%	160,884	43.71%	46,319	12.58%	368,087
Elbert	11,913	60.16%	7,888	39.84%	4,025	20.33%	19,801
Fremont	13,975	56.46%	10,775	43.54%	3,200	12.93%	24,750
Garfield	14,876	50.98%	14,302	49.02%	574	1.97%	29,178
Gilpin	1,908	48.02%	2,065	51.98%	-157	-3.95%	3,973
Grand	4,616	48.12%	4,977	51.88%	-361	-3.76%	9,593
Gunnison	4,407	42.49%	5,964	57.51%	-1,557	-15.01%	10,371
Hinsdale	329	57.32%	245	42.68%	84	14.63%	574
Huerfano	2,322	54.47%	1,941	45.53%	381	8.94%	4,263
Jackson	446	55.68%	355	44.32%	91	11.36%	801
Jefferson	160,676	45.83%	189,914	54.17%	-29,238	-8.34%	350,590
Kiowa	417	49.70%	422	50.30%	-5	-0.60%	839
Kit Carson	2,108	59.56%	1,431	40.44%	677	19.13%	3,539
La Plata	16,635	49.19%	17,185	50.81%	-550	-1.63%	33,820
Lake	1,818	48.77%	1,910	51.23%	-92	-2.47%	3,728
Larimer	102,170	47.34%	113,661	52.66%	-11,491	-5.32%	215,831
Las Animas	4,040	54.21%	3,412	45.79%	628	8.43%	7,452
Lincoln	1,225	48.59%	1,296	51.41%	-71	-2.82%	2,521
Logan	5,027	51.47%	4,740	48.53%	287	2.94%	9,767
Mesa	53,896	61.14%	34,260	38.86%	19,636	22.27%	88,156
Mineral	352	49.65%	357	50.35%	-5	-0.71%	709
Moffat	3,885	61.06%	2,478	38.94%	1,407	22.11%	6,363
Montezuma	8,249	57.13%	6,191	42.87%	2,058	14.25%	14,440
Montrose	15,558	62.96%	9,154	37.04%	6,404	25.91%	24,712
Morgan	7,015	54.16%	5,937	45.84%	1,078	8.32%	12,952
Otero	4,057	46.68%	4,635	53.32%	-578	-6.65%	8,692
Ouray	1,826	46.57%	2,095	53.43%	-269	-6.86%	3,921
Park	6,366	54.33%	5,351	45.67%	1,015	8.66%	11,717
Phillips	1,150	51.94%	1,064	48.06%	86	3.88%	2,214
Pitkin	4,337	41.88%	6,018	58.12%	-1,681	-16.23%	10,355
Prowers	2,527	50.99%	2,429	49.01%	98	1.98%	4,956
Pueblo	46,446	56.65%	35,548	43.35%	10,898	13.29%	81,994
Rio Blanco	2,014	56.65%	1,541	43.35%	473	13.31%	3,555
Rio Grande	3,253	54.15%	2,754	45.85%	499	8.31%	6,007
Routt	6,646	42.39%	9,031	57.61%	-2,385	-15.21%	15,677
Saguache	1,665	51.84%	1,547	48.16%	118	3.67%	3,212
San Juan	231	42.54%	312	57.46%	-81	-14.92%	543
San Miguel	1,947	43.58%	2,521	56.42%	-574	-12.85%	4,468
Sedgwick	718	55.96%	565	44.04%	153	11.93%	1,283
Summit	7,354	44.78%	9,069	55.22%	-1,715	-10.44%	16,423
Teller	9,590	60.46%	6,272	39.54%	3,318	20.92%	15,862
Washington	1,392	51.03%	1,336	48.97%	56	2.05%	2,728
Weld	97,964	56.70%	74,810	43.30%	23,154	13.40%	172,774
Yuma	1,993	44.16%	2,520	55.84%	-527	-11.68%	4,513
Total	1,507,236	49.32%	1,548,679	50.68%	-41,443	-1.36%	3,055,915

== See also ==
- 2024 United States ballot measures
- List of Colorado ballot measures
