= 2022 Colorado House of Representatives election =

2022 Colorado House of Representatives elections
- November 8, 2022

All 65 seats in the Colorado House of Representatives 33 seats needed for a majority
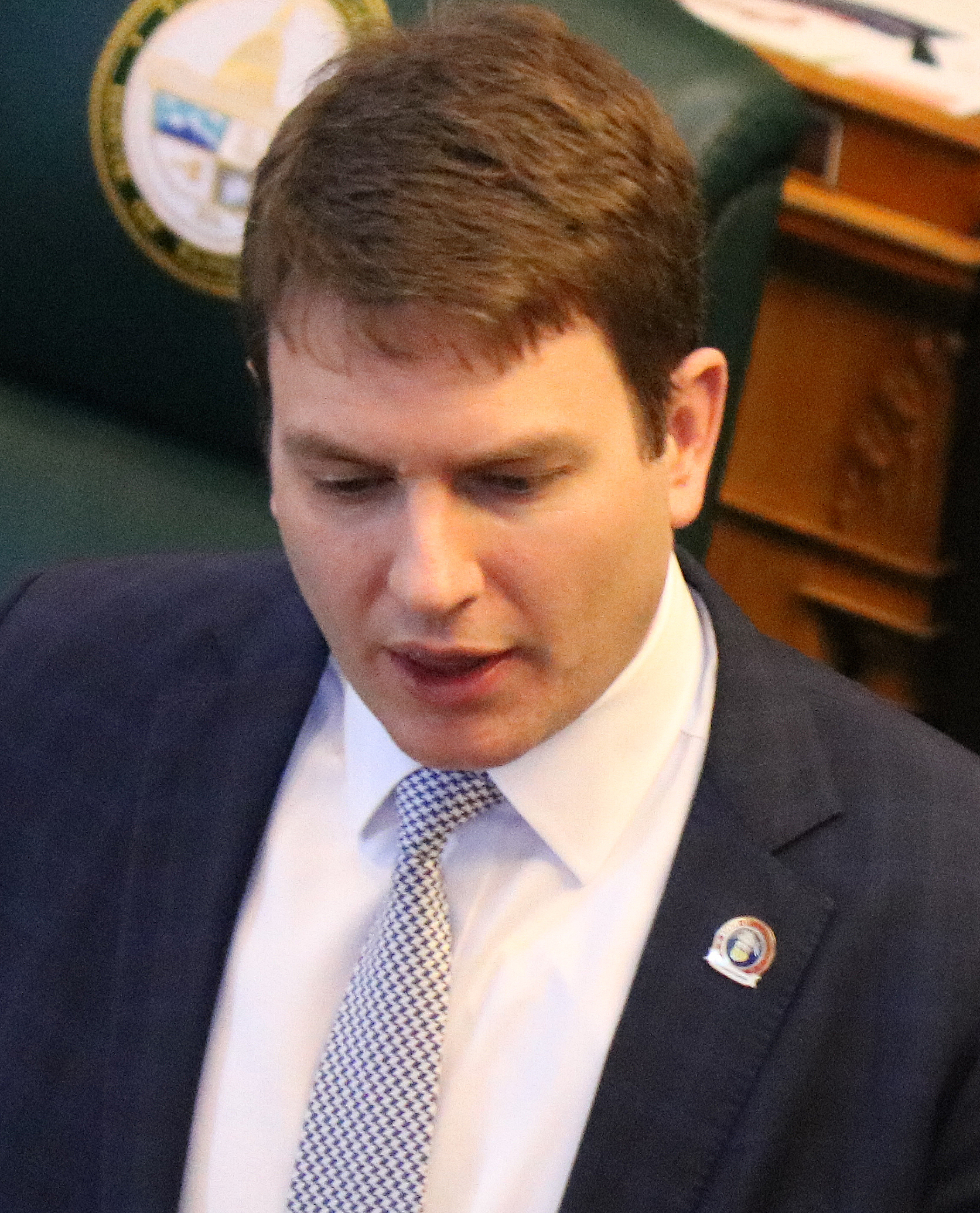

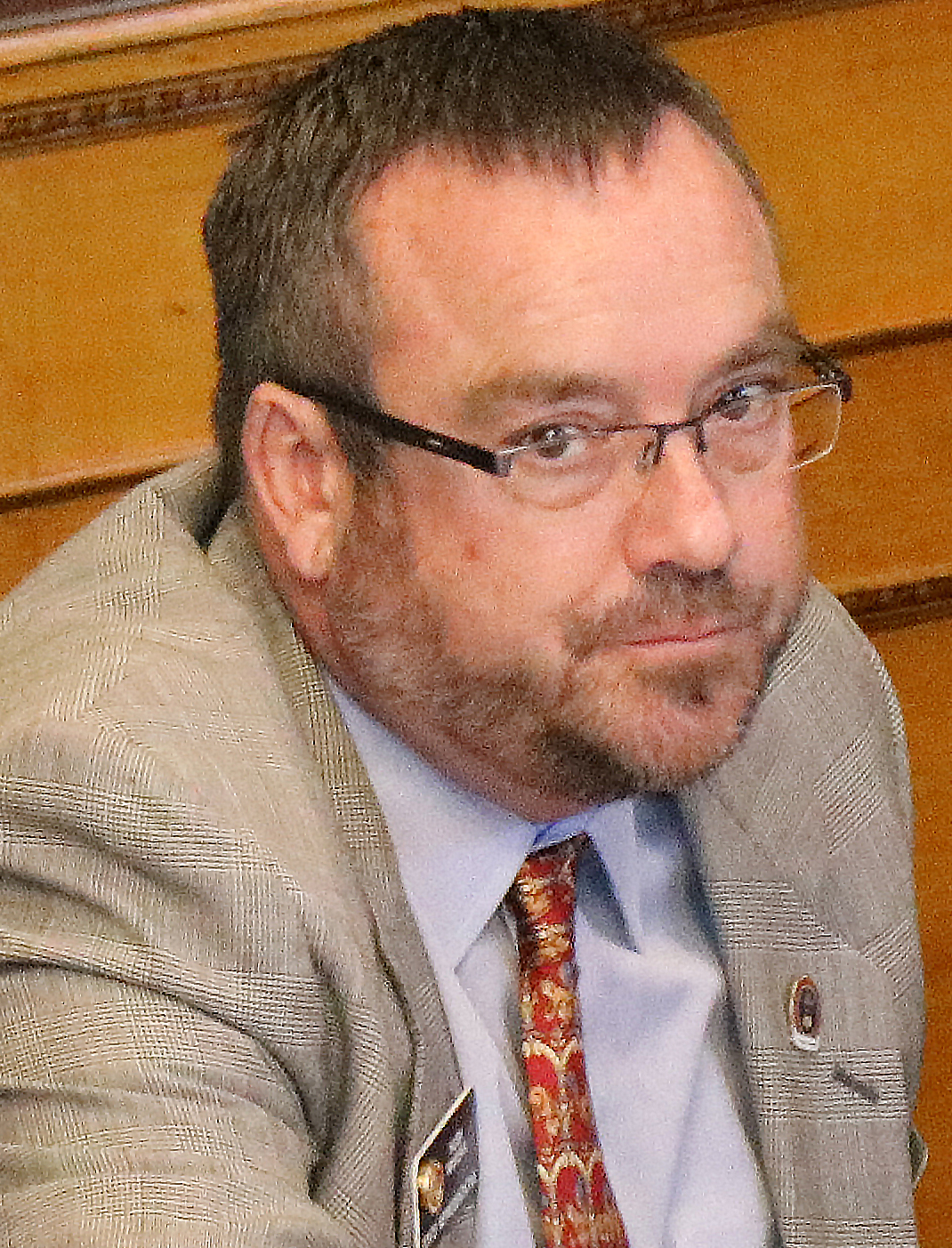
	Majority party	Minority party
Leader	Alec Garnett (term-limited)	Hugh McKean (Note: McKean died on October 30, 2022, while running unopposed for re-election in his district. The vacancy to his seat will be filled by a party committee.)
Party	Democratic	Republican
Leader's seat	2nd district	51st district
Last election	41	24
Seats before	41	24
Seats won	46	19
Seat change	▲5	▼5
Popular vote	1,271,525	1,093,148
Percentage	53.33%	45.85%
Swing	▼0.57 pp	▲2.13 pp
- Democratic hold Democratic gain Republican hold Republican gain 40–50% 50–60% 60–70% 70–80% 80–90% >90% 50–60% 60–70% 70–80% >90%
Speaker before election
Alec Garnett
Democratic
Elected Speaker
Julie McCluskie
Democratic

The 2022 Colorado House of Representatives elections took place on November 8, 2022, along with the elections in the State Senate. The primary elections were held on June 28, 2022. Voters in all 65 districts of the state House elected their representative for a two-year term. These coincided with other Colorado elections of the same year and the biennial United States elections.

Democrats gained five seats, increasing their majority to 46 out of 65 seats and giving them a supermajority in the State House for the first time in over 50 years.

== Background ==
In the previous state House election (2020), the Democrats held on to their majority of 17 seats, with no net seat change. Therefore, for Democrats to lose their absolute majority in the House in this election, Republicans and other parties needed to gain at least 9 more seats.

This was the first election with the districts drawn based on the 2020 census.

== Incumbents not seeking re-election ==
Representatives who have served four consecutive terms are not eligible for re-election. For terms to be considered non-consecutive, there needs to be a gap of at least four years between them.

=== Democrats ===
- District 1: Susan Lontine retired due to term limits.
- District 2: Alec Garnett retired due to term limits.
- District 17: Tony Exum retired to run for state senator from District 11, and was term-limited.
- District 25: Lisa Cutter retired to run for state senator from District 20.
- District 26: Dylan Roberts retired to run for state senator from District 8.
- District 28: Kerry Tipper retired.
- District 31: Yadira Caraveo retired to run for U. S. representative from Colorado's 8th congressional district.
- District 33: Matt Gray retired.
- District 34: Kyle Mullica retired to run for state senator from District 24.
- District 37: Tom Sullivan retired to run for state senator from District 27.
- District 46: Daneya Esgar retired due to term limits.
- District 62: Donald Valdez retired to run for U. S. representative from Colorado's 3rd congressional district.

=== Republicans ===
- District 14: Shane Sandridge retired.
- District 15: Dave Williams retired to run for U. S. representative from Colorado's 5th congressional district.
- District 16: Andres G. Pico retired.
- District 19: Tim Geitner retired.
- District 20: Terri Carver retired due to term limits.
- District 39: Mark Baisley retired to run for state senator from District 4.
- District 44: Kim Ransom retired due to term limits.
- District 45: Patrick Neville retired due to term limits.
- District 48: Tonya Van Beber retired to run for state senator from District 1.
- District 55: Janice Rich retired to run for state senator from District 7.
- District 60: Ron Hanks retired to run for U. S. senator.
- District 65: Rod Pelton retired to run for state senator from District 35.

== Predictions ==
Source	Ranking	As of
Sabato's Crystal Ball	Likely D	May 19, 2022

== Results ==
District	Incumbent	Party	Elected	Party
1	Susan Lontine^{†}	Dem	Javier Mabrey	Dem
2	Alec Garnett^{†}	Dem	Steven Woodrow	Dem
2	Steven Woodrow	Dem	Steven Woodrow	Dem
3	Meg Froelich	Dem	Meg Froelich	Dem
4	Serena Gonzales-Gutierrez	Dem	Serena Gonzales-Gutierrez	Dem
5	Alex Valdez	Dem	Alex Valdez	Dem
6			Elisabeth Epps	Dem
7	Jennifer Bacon	Dem	Jennifer Bacon	Dem
8	Leslie Herod	Dem	Leslie Herod	Dem
9	Emily Sirota	Dem	Emily Sirota	Dem
10	Edie Hooton	Dem	Junie Joseph	Dem
11	Karen McCormick	Dem	Karen McCormick	Dem
12	Tracey Bernett	Dem	Tracey Bernett	Dem
13			Julie McCluskie	Dem
14	Shane Sandridge^{†}	Rep	Rose Pugliese	Rep
15	Dave Williams^{†}	Rep	Scott T. Bottoms	Rep
16	Andres G. Pico^{†}	Rep	Stephanie Vigil	Dem
17	Tony Exum^{†}	Dem	Regina English	Dem
18	Marc Snyder	Dem	Marc Snyder	Dem
19	Tim Geitner^{†}	Rep	Jennifer Lea Parenti	Dem
19	Dan Woog	Rep	Jennifer Lea Parenti	Dem
20	Terri Carver^{†}	Rep	Don Wilson	Rep
21	Mary Bradfield	Rep	Mary Bradfield	Rep
22			Kenneth G DeGraaf	Rep
23	Chris Kennedy	Dem	Monica Irasema Duran	Dem
24	Monica Duran	Dem	Lindsey N. Daugherty	Dem
25	Lisa Cutter^{†}	Dem	Tammy Story	Dem
25	Colin Larson	Rep	Tammy Story	Dem
26	Dylan Roberts^{†}	Dem	Meghan Lukens	Dem
27	Brianna Titone	Dem	Brianna Titone	Dem
28	Kerry Tipper^{†}	Dem	Sheila Lieder	Dem
29	Lindsey N. Daugherty	Dem	Shannon Bird	Dem
30	Dafna Michaelson Jenet	Dem	Chris Kennedy	Dem
31	Yadira Caraveo^{†}	Dem	Said Sharbini	Dem
32	Adrienne Benavidez	Dem	Dafna Michaelson Jenet	Dem
33	Matt Gray^{†}	Dem	William Lindstedt	Dem
34	Kyle Mullica^{†}	Dem	Jenny Wilford	Dem
35	Shannon Bird	Dem	Adrienne Benavidez	Dem
36	Mike Weissman	Dem	Mike Weissman	Dem
37	Tom Sullivan^{†}	Dem	Ruby Dickson	Dem
38	David Ortiz	Dem	David Ortiz	Dem
39	Mark Baisley^{†}	Rep	Brandi Bradley	Rep
40	Naquetta Ricks	Dem	Naquetta Ricks	Dem
41	Iman Jodeh	Dem	Iman Jodeh	Dem
42	Mandy Lindsay	Dem	Mandy Lindsay	Dem
43	Kurt Huffman	Rep	Bob Marshall	Dem
44	Kim Ransom^{†}	Rep	Anthony Hartsook	Rep
45	Patrick Neville^{†}	Rep	Lisa Frizell	Rep
46	Daneya Esgar^{†}	Dem	Tisha Mauro	Dem
47			Ty Winter	Rep
48	Tonya Van Beber^{†}	Rep	Gabe Evans	Rep
49	Mike Lynch^{†}	Rep	Judy Amabile	Dem
49	Judy Amabile	Dem	Judy Amabile	Dem
50	Mary Young	Dem	Mary Young	Dem
51	Hugh McKean	Rep	Hugh McKean	Rep
52	Cathy Kipp	Dem	Cathy Kipp	Dem
53	Andrew Boesenecker	Dem	Andrew Boesenecker	Dem
54	Matt Soper	Rep	Matt Soper	Rep
55	Janice Rich^{†}	Rep	Rick Taggart	Rep
56	Rod Bockenfeld	Rep	Rod Bockenfeld	Rep
57	Perry Will	Rep	Elizabeth Velasco	Dem
58	Marc Catlin	Rep	Marc Catlin	Rep
59	Barbara McLachlan	Dem	Barbara McLachlan	Dem
60	Ron Hanks^{†}	Rep	Stephanie Luck	Rep
60	Stephanie Luck	Rep	Stephanie Luck	Rep
61	Julie McCluskie	Dem	Eliza Hamrick	Dem
62	Donald Valdez^{†}	Dem	Matthew Martinez	Dem
63	Dan Woog	Rep	Richard Holtorf	Rep
64	Richard Holtorf	Rep	Ryan Armagost	Rep
65	Rod Pelton^{†}	Rep	Mike Lynch	Rep
65	Mike Lynch	Rep	Mike Lynch	Rep

† - Incumbent not seeking re-election

=== Closest races ===
Seats where the margin of victory was under 10%:

1. District 43, 0.9% gain
2. District 25, 1.39% gain
3. District 50, 1.71%
4. District 16, 2.17% gain
5. District 61, 2.82%
6. District 19, 3.37% gain
7. District 28, 5.24%
8. District 26, 7.16%
9. District 57, 7.72% gain
10. District 46, 7.98%
11. District 18, 8.5%

== Detailed results ==
=== District 1 ===
1st District Democratic primary
Party	Candidate	Votes	%
Democratic	Javier Mabrey	7,305	100.0
Total votes		7,305	100.0

1st District Republican primary
Party	Candidate	Votes	%
Republican	Guillermo Diaz	3,395	100.0
Total votes		3,395	100.o

2022 Colorado House of Representatives election, 1st district
Party	Candidate	Votes	%
Democratic	Javier Mabrey	17,903	64.80
Republican	Guillermo Diaz	8,981	32.51
Libertarian	Kyle Furey	743	2.69
Total votes		27,627	100.0

=== District 2 ===
2nd District Democratic primary
Party	Candidate	Votes	%
Democratic	Steven Woodrow (incumbent)	14,067	100.0
Total votes		14,067	100.0

2nd District Republican primary
Party	Candidate	Votes	%
Republican	Stephanie Wheeler	3,953	100.0
Total votes		3,953	100.0

2022 Colorado House of Representatives election,2nd District
Party	Candidate	Votes	%
Democratic	Steven Woodrow (incumbent)	34,213	75.40
Republican	Stephanie Wheeler	10,476	23.09
Libertarian	Justin Savoy	689	1.52
Total votes		45,378	100.0

=== District 3 ===
3rd District Democratic primary
Party	Candidate	Votes	%
Democratic	Meg Froelich (incumbent)	8,028	100.0
Total votes		8,028	100.0

3rd District Republican primary
Party	Candidate	Votes	%
Republican	María Fernández	4,386	100.0
Total votes		4,386	100.0

2022 Colorado House of Representatives election, 3rd District
Party	Candidate	Votes	%
Democratic	Meg Froelich (incumbent)	21,957	65.97
Republican	María Fernández	10,570	31.76
Libertarian	Clayton Casciato	757	2.27
Total votes		33,284	100.0

=== District 4 ===
4th District Democratic primary
Party	Candidate	Votes	%
Democratic	Serena Gonzales-Gutierrez (incumbent)	10,207	100.0
Total votes		10,207	100.0

4th District Republican primary
Party	Candidate	Votes	%
Republican	Jack Daus	1,765	100.0
Total votes		1,765	100.0

2022 Colorado House of Representatives election, 4th District
Party	Candidate	Votes	%
Democratic	Serena Gonzales-Gutierrez (incumbent)	27,116	82.66
Republican	Jack Daus	5,687	17.34
Total votes		32,803	100.0

=== District 5 ===
5th District Democratic primary
Party	Candidate	Votes	%
Democratic	Alex Valdez (incumbent)	8,040	100.0
Total votes		8,040	100.0

5th District Republican primary
Party	Candidate	Votes	%
Republican	Johnnie Johnson	1,289	100.0
Total votes		1,289	100.0

2022 Colorado House of Representatives election, 5th District
Party	Candidate	Votes	%
Democratic	Alex Valdez (incumbent)	24,306	82.82
Republican	Johnnie Johnson	4,502	15.34
Unity	Troy Brekke	539	1.84
Total votes		29,347	100.0

=== District 6 ===
6th District Democratic primary
Party	Candidate	Votes	%
Democratic	Elisabeth Epps	9,201	53.17
Democratic	Katie March	8,105	46.83
Total votes		17,306	100.0

6th District Republican primary
Party	Candidate	Votes	%
Republican	Donald Howell	2,055	100.0
Total votes		2,055	100.0

2022 Colorado House of Representatives election, 6th District
Party	Candidate	Votes	%
Democratic	Elisabeth Epps	32,951	85.77
Republican	Donald Howell	5,448	14.18
No party preference	Jordan Friedman (write-in)	20	0.05
Total votes		38,419	100.0

=== District 7 ===
7th District Democratic primary
Party	Candidate	Votes	%
Democratic	Jennifer Bacon (incumbent)	6,377	100.0
Total votes		6,377	100.0

2022 Colorado House of Representatives election, 7th District
Party	Candidate	Votes	%
Democratic	Jennifer Bacon (incumbent)	16,795	100.0
Total votes		16,795	100.0

=== District 8 ===
8th District Democratic primary
Party	Candidate	Votes	%
Democratic	Leslie Herod (incumbent)	14,570	100.0
Total votes		14,570	100.0

8th District Republican primary
Party	Candidate	Votes	%
Republican	Hileary Waters	1,494	100.0
Total votes		1,494	100.0

2022 Colorado House of Representatives election, 8th District
Party	Candidate	Votes	%
Democratic	Leslie Herod (incumbent)	35,015	87.87
Republican	Hileary Waters	4,833	12.13
Total votes		39,848	100.0

=== District 9 ===
9th District Democratic primary
Party	Candidate	Votes	%
Democratic	Emily Sirota (incumbent)	10,731	100.0
Total votes		10,731	100.0

9th District Republican primary
Party	Candidate	Votes	%
Republican	Tom Cowhick	3,201	100.0
Total votes		3,201	100.0

2022 Colorado House of Representatives election, 9th District
Party	Candidate	Votes	%
Democratic	Emily Sirota (incumbent)	25,925	76.87
Republican	Tom Cowhick	7,802	23.13
Total votes		33,727	100.0

=== District 10 ===
10th District Democratic primary
Party	Candidate	Votes	%
Democratic	Edie Hooton (incumbent)	12,451	100.0
Total votes		12,451	100.0

10th District Republican primary
Party	Candidate	Votes	%
Republican	William DeOreo	1,361	100.0
Total votes		1,361	100.0

2022 Colorado House of Representatives election, 10th District
Party	Candidate	Votes	%
Democratic	Junie Joseph	30,894	88.08
Republican	William DeOreo	4,182	11.92
Total votes		35,076	100.0

=== District 11 ===
11th District Democratic primary
Party	Candidate	Votes	%
Democratic	Karen McCormick (incumbent)	11,578	100.0
Total votes		11,578	100.0

11th District Republican primary
Party	Candidate	Votes	%
Republican	Tara Menza	5,098	100.0
Total votes		5,098	100.0

2022 Colorado House of Representatives election, 11th District
Party	Candidate	Votes	%
Democratic	Karen McCormick (incumbent)	26,855	69.73
Republican	Tara Menza	11,657	30.27
Total votes		38,512	100.0

=== District 12 ===
12th District Democratic primary
Party	Candidate	Votes	%
Democratic	Tracey Bernett (incumbent)	15,130	100.0
Total votes		15,130	100.0

12th District Republican primary
Party	Candidate	Votes	%
Republican	Anya Kirvan	3,876	100.0
Total votes		3,876	100.0

2022 Colorado House of Representatives election, 12th District
Party	Candidate	Votes	%
Democratic	Tracey Bernett (incumbent)	35,127	77.23
Republican	Anya Kirvan	10,356	22.77
Total votes		45,483	100.0

=== District 13 ===
13th District Democratic primary
Party	Candidate	Votes	%
Democratic	Julie McCluskie (incumbent)	8,741	100.0
Total votes		8,741	100.0

13th District Republican primary
Party	Candidate	Votes	%
Republican	David Buckley	8,821	100.0
Total votes		8,821	100.0

2022 Colorado House of Representatives election, 13th District
Party	Candidate	Votes	%
Democratic	Julie McCluskie (incumbent)	25,428	56.03
Republican	David Buckley	19,956	43.97
Total votes		45,834	100.0

=== District 14 ===
14th District Democratic primary
Party	Candidate	Votes	%
Democratic	Rob Rogers	6,322	100.0
Total votes		6,322	100.0

14th District Republican primary
Party	Candidate	Votes	%
Republican	Rose Pugliese	8,898	53.57
Republican	Joe Woyte	7,713	46.43
Total votes		16,611	100.0

2022 Colorado House of Representatives election, 14th District
Party	Candidate	Votes	%
Republican	Rose Pugliese	27,250	60.67
Democratic	Rob Rogers	17,665	39.33
Total votes		44,915	100.0

=== District 15 ===
15th District Democratic primary
Party	Candidate	Votes	%
Democratic	Alvin Sexton	4,623	100.0
Total votes		4,623	100.0

15th District Republican primary
Party	Candidate	Votes	%
Republican	Scott Bottoms	8,722	100.0
Total votes		8,722	100.0

2022 Colorado House of Representatives election, 15th District
Party	Candidate	Votes	%
Republican	Scott Bottoms	17,708	56.76
Democratic	Alvin Sexton	12,200	39.10
Libertarian	John Kaufman	1,291	4.14
Total votes		31,199	100.0

=== District 16 ===
16th District Democratic primary
Party	Candidate	Votes	%
Democratic	Stephanie Vigil	6,785	100.0
Total votes		6,785	100.0

16th District Republican primary
Party	Candidate	Votes	%
Republican	Dave Donelson	8,538	100.0
Total votes		8,538	100.0

2022 Colorado House of Representatives election, 16th District
Party	Candidate	Votes	%
Democratic	Stephanie Vigil	16,243	49.75
Republican	Dave Donelson	15,533	47.58
Libertarian	John Hjersman	870	2.66
Total votes		32,646	100.0

=== District 17 ===
17th District Democratic primary
Party	Candidate	Votes	%
Democratic	Regina English (incumbent)	2,387	53.98
Democratic	Mischa Smith	2,035	46.02
Total votes		4,422	100.0

17th District Republican primary
Party	Candidate	Votes	%
Republican	Rachel Inez Stovall	3,499	100.0
Total votes		3,499	100.0

2022 Colorado House of Representatives election, 17th District
Party	Candidate	Votes	%
Democratic	Regina English (incumbent)	10,313	57.28
Republican	Rachel Inez Stovall	7,693	42.72
Total votes		18,006	100.0

=== District 18 ===
18th District Democratic primary
Party	Candidate	Votes	%
Democratic	Marc Snyder (incumbent)	7,714	100.0
Total votes		7,714	100.0

18th District Republican primary
Party	Candidate	Votes	%
Republican	Shana Black	7,329	67.69
Republican	Summer Groubert	3,498	32.31
Total votes		10,827	100.0

2022 Colorado House of Representatives election, 18th District
Party	Candidate	Votes	%
Democratic	Marc Snyder (incumbent)	20,057	52.80
Republican	Shana Black	16,826	44.30
Libertarian	Greg Lauer	1,101	2.90
Total votes		37,984	100.0

=== District 19 ===
19th District Democratic primary
Party	Candidate	Votes	%
Democratic	Jennifer Lea Parenti	7,566	100.0
Total votes		7,566	100.0

19th District Republican primary
Party	Candidate	Votes	%
Republican	Dan Woog (incumbent)	7,996	100.0
Total votes		7,996	100.0

2022 Colorado House of Representatives election, 19th District
Party	Candidate	Votes	%
Democratic	Jennifer Lea Parenti	21,917	50.34
Republican	Dan Woog (incumbent)	20,450	46.97
Libertarian	Joe Johnson	1,168	2.68
Total votes		43,535	100.0

=== District 20 ===
20th District Democratic primary
Party	Candidate	Votes	%
Democratic	Tracey Johnson	4,682	100.0
Total votes		4,682	100.0

20th District Republican primary
Party	Candidate	Votes	%
Republican	Don Wilson (incumbent)	15,744	100.0
Total votes		15,744	100.0

2022 Colorado House of Representatives election, 20th District
Party	Candidate	Votes	%
Republican	Don Wilson (incumbent)	35,500	100.0
Total votes		35,500	100.0

=== District 21 ===
21st District Democratic primary
Party	Candidate	Votes	%
Democratic	Kolten Montgomery	3,481	100.0
Total votes		3,481	100.0

21st District Republican primary
Party	Candidate	Votes	%
Republican	Mary Bradfield (incumbent)	4,187	65.35
Republican	Karl O'Brian Dent	2,220	34.65
Total votes		6,407	100.0

2022 Colorado House of Representatives election, 21st District
Party	Candidate	Votes	%
Republican	Mary Bradfield (incumbent)	11,612	58.38
Democratic	Kolten Montgomery	8,277	41.62
Total votes		19,889	100.0

=== District 22 ===
22nd District Democratic primary
Party	Candidate	Votes	%
Democratic	Blake Garner	5,512	100.0
Total votes		5,512	100.0

22nd District Republican primary
Party	Candidate	Votes	%
Republican	Kenneth G. DeGraff	11,302	100.0
Total votes		11,302	100.0

2022 Colorado House of Representatives election, 22nd District
Party	Candidate	Votes	%
Republican	Kenneth G. DeGraff	20,763	57.66
Democratic	Blake Garner	14,080	39.10
Libertarian	Michael Giallombardo	1,167	3.24
Total votes		36,010	100.0

=== District 23 ===
23rd District Democratic primary
Party	Candidate	Votes	%
Democratic	Monica Irasema Duran (incumbent)	9,716	100.0
Total votes		9,716	100.0

23rd District Republican primary
Party	Candidate	Votes	%
Republican	Fred Clifford	6,921	100.0
Total votes		6,921	100.0

2022 Colorado House of Representatives election, 23rd District
Party	Candidate	Votes	%
Democratic	Monica Irasema Duran (incumbent)	26,962	64.48
Republican	Fred Clifford	14,723	35.32
Total votes		41,685	100.0

=== District 24 ===
24th District Democratic primary
Party	Candidate	Votes	%
Democratic	Lindsey Daugherty (incumbent)	9,711	100.0
Total votes		9,711	100.0

24th District Republican primary
Party	Candidate	Votes	%
Republican	Bill Patterson	9,396	100.0
Total votes		9,396	100.0

2022 Colorado House of Representatives election, 24th District
Party	Candidate	Votes	%
Democratic	Lindsey Daugherty (incumbent)	26,093	57.51
Republican	Bill Patterson	19,281	42.49
Total votes		45,374	100.0

=== District 25 ===
25th District Democratic primary
Party	Candidate	Votes	%
Democratic	Tammy Story	9,695	100.0
Total votes		9,695	100.0

25th District Republican primary
Party	Candidate	Votes	%
Republican	Colin Larson (incumbent)	9,193	67.55
Republican	Dede Wagner	4,416	32.45
Total votes		13,609	100.0

2022 Colorado House of Representatives election, 25th District
Party	Candidate	Votes	%
Democratic	Tammy Story	25,678	49.67
Republican	Colin Larson (incumbent)	24,959	48.28
Libertarian	Todd Dennison	1,060	2.05
Total votes		51,697	100.0

=== District 26 ===
26th District Democratic primary
Party	Candidate	Votes	%
Democratic	Meghan Lukens	6,157	100.0
Total votes		6,157	100.0

26th District Republican primary
Party	Candidate	Votes	%
Republican	Savannah Wolfson	5,999	61.50
Republican	Glenn Lowe III	3,756	38.50
Total votes		9,755	100.0

2022 Colorado House of Representatives election, 26th District
Party	Candidate	Votes	%
Democratic	Meghan Lukens	21,212	53.58
Republican	Savannah Wolfson	18,376	46.42
Total votes		39,588	100.0

=== District 27 ===
27th District Democratic primary
Party	Candidate	Votes	%
Democratic	Brianna Titone (incumbent)	9,586	100.0
Total votes		9,586	100.0

27th District Republican primary
Party	Candidate	Votes	%
Republican	Christina Carlino	8,508	100.0
Total votes		8,508	100.0

2022 Colorado House of Representatives election, 27th District
Party	Candidate	Votes	%
Democratic	Brianna Titone (incumbent)	26,380	57.74
Republican	Lynn Emrick	18,169	39.77
Libertarian	Jacob Luria	1,136	2.49
Total votes		45,685	100.0

=== District 28 ===
28th District Democratic primary
Party	Candidate	Votes	%
Democratic	Leanne Emm	7,951	100.0
Total votes		7,951	100.0

28th District Republican primary
Party	Candidate	Votes	%
Republican	Dan Montoya	8,740	100.0
Total votes		8,740	100.0

2022 Colorado House of Representatives election, 28th District
Party	Candidate	Votes	%
Democratic	Sheila Lieder	22,064	51.57
Republican	Dan Montoya	19,821	46.33
Libertarian	Brian Bakkum	898	2.10
Total votes		42,783	100.0

=== District 29 ===
29th District Democratic primary
Party	Candidate	Votes	%
Democratic	Shannon Bird (incumbent)	8,991	100.0
Total votes		8,991	100.0

29th District Republican primary
Party	Candidate	Votes	%
Republican	Vanesa DeMott	6,888	100.0
Total votes		6,888	100.0

2022 Colorado House of Representatives election, 29th District
Party	Candidate	Votes	%
Democratic	Shannon Bird (incumbent)	24,632	60.93
Republican	Vanesa DeMott	15,796	39.07
Total votes		40,428	100.0

=== District 30 ===
30th District Democratic primary
Party	Candidate	Votes	%
Democratic	Chris Kennedy (incumbent)	8,295	100.0
Total votes		8,295	100.0

30th District Republican primary
Party	Candidate	Votes	%
Republican	Russ Carter	5,412	100.0
Total votes		5,412	100.0

2022 Colorado House of Representatives election, 30th District
Party	Candidate	Votes	%
Democratic	Chris Kennedy (incumbent)	22,504	65.86
Republican	Russ Carter	11,665	34.14
Total votes			

=== District 31 ===
31st District Democratic primary
Party	Candidate	Votes	%
Democratic	Said Sharbini	4,859	100.0
Total votes		4,859	100.0

31st District Republican primary
Party	Candidate	Votes	%
Republican	Heidi Pitchforth	3,552	100.0
Total votes		3,552	100.0

2022 Colorado House of Representatives election, 31st District
Party	Candidate	Votes	%
Democratic	Said Sharbini	13,461	58.58
Republican	Heidi Pitchforth	9,517	41.42
Total votes		22,978	100.0

=== District 32 ===
32nd District Democratic primary
Party	Candidate	Votes	%
Democratic	Dafna Michaelson Jenet (incumbent)	4,051	100.0
Total votes		4,051	100.0

32nd District Republican primary
Party	Candidate	Votes	%
Republican	Justin Brown	3,157	100.0
Total votes		3,157	100.0

2022 Colorado House of Representatives election, 32nd District
Party	Candidate	Votes	%
Democratic	Dafna Michaelson Jenet (incumbent)	12,637	56.08
Republican	Justin Brown	9,897	43.92
Total votes		22,534	100.0

=== District 33 ===
33rd District Democratic primary
Party	Candidate	Votes	%
Democratic	William Lindstedt	9,968	100.0
Total votes		9,968	100.0

33rd District Republican primary
Party	Candidate	Votes	%
Republican	Stacie Dougherty	8,076	100.0
Total votes		8,076	100.0

2022 Colorado House of Representatives election, 33rd District
Party	Candidate	Votes	%
Democratic	William Lindstedt	25,549	58.82
Republican	Stacie Dougherty	17,884	41.18
Total votes		43,433	100.0

=== District 34 ===
34th District Democratic primary
Party	Candidate	Votes	%
Democratic	Jenny Willford	4,679	58.69
Democratic	Sam Nizam	3,294	41.31
Total votes		7,973	100.0

34th District Republican primary
Party	Candidate	Votes	%
Republican	Kevin Allen	5,719	100.0
Total votes		5,719	100.0

2022 Colorado House of Representatives election, 34th District
Party	Candidate	Votes	%
Democratic	Jenny Willford	17,601	54.09
Republican	Kevin Allen	14,029	43.12
Libertarian	Rob Stutz	908	2.79
Total votes		32,538	100.0

=== District 35 ===
35th District Democratic primary
Party	Candidate	Votes	%
Democratic	Adrienne Benavidez (incumbent)	5,476	100.0
Total votes		5,476	100.0

35th District Republican primary
Party	Candidate	Votes	%
Republican	Craig Jones	2,759	100.0
Total votes		2,759	100.0

2022 Colorado House of Representatives election, 35th District
Party	Candidate	Votes	%
Democratic	Adrienne Benavidez (incumbent)	15,077	65.97
Republican	Craig Jones	7,779	34.03
Total votes		22,856	100.0

=== District 36 ===
35th District Democratic primary
Party	Candidate	Votes	%
Democratic	Mike Weissman (incumbent)	4,620	100.0
Total votes		4,620	100.0

36th District Republican primary
Party	Candidate	Votes	%
Republican	William Walters	3,001	100.0
Total votes		3,001	100.0

2022 Colorado House of Representatives election, 36th District
Party	Candidate	Votes	%
Democratic	Mike Weissman (incumbent)	13,736	64.05
Republican	William Walters	7,058	32.91
Libertarian	Andrew Gibson	653	3.04
Total votes		21,447	100.0

=== District 37 ===
37th District Democratic primary
Party	Candidate	Votes	%
Democratic	Ruby Dickson	7,730	100.0
Total votes		7,730	100.0

37th District Republican primary
Party	Candidate	Votes	%
Republican	Paul Archer	7,802	100.0
Total votes		7,802	100.0

2022 Colorado House of Representatives election, 37th District
Party	Candidate	Votes	%
Democratic	Ruby Dickson	23,307	55.98
Republican	Paul Archer	18,324	44.02
Total votes		41,631	100.0

=== District 38 ===
38th District Democratic primary
Party	Candidate	Votes	%
Democratic	David Ortiz (incumbent)	9,757	100.0
Total votes		9,757	100.0

38th District Republican primary
Party	Candidate	Votes	%
Republican	Jaylen Mosqueira	9,678	100.0
Total votes		9,678	100.0

2022 Colorado House of Representatives election, 38th District
Party	Candidate	Votes	%
Democratic	David Ortiz (incumbent)	25,765	54.52
Republican	Jaylen Mosqueira	20,394	43.15
Libertarian	Brandon L. McDowell	1,103	2.33
Total votes		47,262	100.0

=== District 39 ===
39th District Democratic primary
Party	Candidate	Votes	%
Democratic	Eric Brody	6,406	100.0
Total votes		6,406	100.0

39th District Republican primary
Party	Candidate	Votes	%
Republican	Brandi Bradley	12,661	100.0
Total votes		12,661	100.0

2022 Colorado House of Representatives election, 39th District
Party	Candidate	Votes	%
Republican	Brandi Bradley	28,347	58.06
Democratic	Eric Brody	20,475	41.94
Total votes		48,822	100.0

=== District 40 ===
40th District Democratic primary
Party	Candidate	Votes	%
Democratic	Naquetta Ricks (incumbent)	7,124	100.0
Total votes		7,124	100.0

40th District Republican primary
Party	Candidate	Votes	%
Republican	Le Sellers	5,475	100.0
Total votes		5,475	100.0

2022 Colorado House of Representatives election, 40th District
Party	Candidate	Votes	%
Democratic	Naquetta Ricks (incumbent)	20,116	61.11
Republican	Le Sellers	12,801	38.89
Total votes		32,917	100.0

=== District 41 ===
41st District Democratic primary
Party	Candidate	Votes	%
Democratic	Iman Jodeh (incumbent)	7,935	100.0
Total votes		7,935	100.0

41st District Republican primary
Party	Candidate	Votes	%
Republican	Stephanie Hancock	4,687	100.0
Total votes		4,687	100.0

2022 Colorado House of Representatives election, 41st district
Party	Candidate	Votes	%
Democratic	Iman Jodeh (incumbent)	18,544	64.01
Republican	Stephanie Hancock	10,426	35.99
Total votes		28,970	100.0

=== District 42 ===
42nd District Democratic primary
Party	Candidate	Votes	%
Democratic	Mandy Lindsay (incumbent)	2,980	58.45
Democratic	Gail Pough	2,118	41.55
Total votes		5,098	100.0

42nd District Republican primary
Party	Candidate	Votes	%
Republican	Cory Parella	2,048	100.0
Total votes		2,048	100.0

2022 Colorado House of Representatives election, 42nd district
Party	Candidate	Votes	%
Democratic	Mandy Lindsay (incumbent)	12,441	72.57
Republican	Cory Parella	4,703	27.43
Total votes		17,144	100.0

=== District 43 ===
43rd District Democratic primary
Party	Candidate	Votes	%
Democratic	Bob Marshall	7,659	100.0
Total votes		7,659	100.0

43rd District Republican primary
Party	Candidate	Votes	%
Republican	Kurt Huffman (incumbent)	7,423	60.88
Republican	Robin Webb	4,770	39.12
Total votes		12,193	100.0

2022 Colorado House of Representatives election, 43rd District
Party	Candidate	Votes	%
Democratic	Bob Marshall	22,876	50.45
Republican	Kurt Huffman (incumbent)	22,471	49.55
Total votes		45,347	100.0

=== District 44 ===
44th District Democratic primary
Party	Candidate	Votes	%
Democratic	Bob Henry	5,137	100.0
Total votes		5,137	100.0

44th District Republican primary
Party	Candidate	Votes	%
Republican	Anthony Hartsook	7,361	62.65
Republican	Terry Dodd	4,388	37.35
Total votes		11,749	100.0

2022 Colorado House of Representatives election, 44th District
Party	Candidate	Votes	%
Republican	Anthony Hartsook	23,362	57.20
Democratic	Bob Henry	16,333	39.99
Libertarian	John Sutton	1,147	2.81
Total votes		40,842	100.0

=== District 45 ===
45th District Democratic primary
Party	Candidate	Votes	%
Democratic	Ruby Martinez	5,830	100.0
Total votes		5,830	100.0

45th District Republican primary
Party	Candidate	Votes	%
Republican	Lisa Frizell	8,498	56.07
Republican	Bill Jack	6,658	43.93
Total votes		15,196	100.0

2022 Colorado House of Representatives election, 45th District
Party	Candidate	Votes	%
Republican	Lisa Frizell	27,884	61.88
Democratic	Ruby Martinez	17,180	38.12
Total votes		45,064	100.0

=== District 46 ===
46th District Democratic primary
Party	Candidate	Votes	%
Democratic	Tisha Lyn Mauro	6,127	54.86
Democratic	Jason Munoz	5,042	45.14
Total votes		11,169	100.0

46th District Republican primary
Party	Candidate	Votes	%
Republican	Jonathan Ambler	7,675	100.0
Total votes		7,675	100.0

2022 Colorado House of Representatives election, 46th District
Party	Candidate	Votes	%
Democratic	Tisha Lyn Mauro	20,197	53.99
Republican	Jonathan Ambler	17,214	46.01
Total votes		37,411	100.0

=== District 47 ===
47th District Democratic primary
Party	Candidate	Votes	%
Democratic	Edwin Dean Ormiston	5,934	100.0
Total votes		5,934	100.0

47th District Republican primary
Party	Candidate	Votes	%
Republican	Ty Winter	11,395	100.0
Total votes		11,395	100.0

2022 Colorado House of Representatives election, 47th District
Party	Candidate	Votes	%
Republican	Ty Winter	23,722	64.82
Democratic	Edwin Dean Ormiston	12,874	35.18
Total votes		36,596	100.0

=== District 48 ===
48th District Democratic primary
Party	Candidate	Votes	%
Democratic	Spring Erickson	4,079	100.0
Total votes		4,079	100.0

48th District Republican primary
Party	Candidate	Votes	%
Republican	Gabe Evans	6,394	70.23
Republican	Terry Lee Robert DeGroot	2,710	29.77
Total votes		9,104	100.0

2022 Colorado House of Representatives election, 48th District
Party	Candidate	Votes	%
Republican	Gabe Evans	20,011	63.31
Democratic	Spring Erickson	10,730	33.95
Libertarian	Eric E. Joss	866	2.74
Total votes		31,607	100.0

=== District 49 ===
49th District Democratic primary
Party	Candidate	Votes	%
Democratic	Judy Amabile (incumbent)	13,682	100.0
Total votes		13,682	100.0

49th District Republican primary
Party	Candidate	Votes	%
Republican	Kathryn Leher	5,421	56.79
Republican	John Caldwell	4,125	43.21
Total votes		9,546	100.0

2022 Colorado House of Representatives election, 49th District
Party	Candidate	Votes	%
Democratic	Judy Amabile (incumbent)	33,326	64.31
Republican	Kathryn Leher	17,186	33.17
Libertarian	Daniel Lutz	1,306	2.52
Total votes		51,818	100.0

=== District 50 ===
50th District Democratic primary
Party	Candidate	Votes	%
Democratic	Mary Young (incumbent)	2,860	100.0
Total votes		2,860	100.0

50th District Republican primary
Party	Candidate	Votes	%
Republican	Ryan Gonzalez	3,757	100.0
Total votes		3,757	100.0

2022 Colorado House of Representatives election, 50th District
Party	Candidate	Votes	%
Democratic	Mary Young (incumbent)	8,616	49.19
Republican	Ryan Gonzalez	8,286	47.30
Libertarian	Kyle Moore	615	3.51
Total votes		17,571	100.0

=== District 51 ===
51st District Republican primary
Party	Candidate	Votes	%
Republican	Hugh McKean (incumbent)	7,741	55.97
Republican	Austin Hein	6,089	44.03
Total votes		13,830	100.0

2022 Colorado House of Representatives election, 51st District
Party	Candidate	Votes	%
Republican	Hugh McKean (incumbent)	26,542	100.0
Total votes		26,542	100.0

=== District 52 ===
52nd District Democratic primary
Party	Candidate	Votes	%
Democratic	Cathy Kipp (incumbent)	9,378	100.0
Total votes		9,378	100.0

52nd District Republican primary
Party	Candidate	Votes	%
Republican	Deborah Vicino	7,188	100.0
Total votes		7,188	100.0

2022 Colorado House of Representatives election, 52nd district
Party	Candidate	Votes	%
Democratic	Cathy Kipp (incumbent)	28,183	64.84
Republican	Deborah Vicino	15,282	35.16
Total votes		43,465	100.0

=== District 53 ===
53rd District Democratic primary
Party	Candidate	Votes	%
Democratic	Andrew Boesenecker (incumbent)	7,782	100.0
Total votes		7,782	100.0

2022 Colorado House of Representatives election, 53rd District
Party	Candidate	Votes	%
Democratic	Andrew Boesenecker (incumbent)	25,934	75.92
Republican	Donna Walter	8,224	24.08
Total votes		34,158	100.0

=== District 54 ===
54th District Democratic primary
Party	Candidate	Votes	%
Democratic	AliceMarie Slaven-Emond	4,198	100.0
Total votes		4,198	100.0

54th District Republican primary
Party	Candidate	Votes	%
Republican	Matt Soper (incumbent)	16,400	100.0
Total votes		16,400	100.0

2022 Colorado House of Representatives election, 54th District
Party	Candidate	Votes	%
Republican	Matt Soper (incumbent)	31,026	73.80
Democratic	AliceMarie Slaven-Emond	11,013	26.20
Total votes		42,039	100.0

=== District 55 ===
55th District Democratic primary
Party	Candidate	Votes	%
Democratic	Damon Davis	5,215	100.0
Total votes		5,215	100.0

55th District Republican primary
Party	Candidate	Votes	%
Republican	Rick Taggart	9,789	52.70
Republican	Trish Weber	8,787	47.30
Total votes		18,576	100.0

2022 Colorado House of Representatives election, 55th District
Party	Candidate	Votes	%
Republican	Rick Taggart	25,411	63.61
Democratic	Damon Davis	14,356	36.39
Total votes		39,947	100.0

=== District 56 ===
56th District Democratic primary
Party	Candidate	Votes	%
Democratic	Kathleen Conway	3,620	100.0
Total votes		3,620	100.0

56th District Republican primary
Party	Candidate	Votes	%
Republican	Rod Bockenfeld (incumbent)	16,046	100.0
Total votes		16,046	100.0

2022 Colorado House of Representatives election, 56th District
Party	Candidate	Votes	%
Republican	Rod Bockenfeld (incumbent)	33,608	75.83
Democratic	Kathleen Conway	9,495	21.42
Libertarian	Amy Lunde	1,218	2.75
Total votes		44,321	100.0

=== District 57 ===
57th District Democratic primary
Party	Candidate	Votes	%
Democratic	Elizabeth Velasco	5,414	64.23
Democratic	Colin Buerger	3,015	35.77
Total votes		8,429	100.0

57th District Republican primary
Party	Candidate	Votes	%
Republican	Perry Will (incumbent)	8,220	100.0
Total votes		8,220	100.0

2022 Colorado House of Representatives election, 57th District
Party	Candidate	Votes	%
Democratic	Elizabeth Velasco	19,885	53.86
Republican	Perry Will (incumbent)	17,033	46.14
Total votes		36,918	100.0

=== District 58 ===
58th District Democratic primary
Party	Candidate	Votes	%
Democratic	Kevin Stanley Kuns	6,169	100.0
Total votes		6,169	100.0

58th District Republican primary
Party	Candidate	Votes	%
Republican	Marc Catlin (incumbent)	14,706	100.0
Total votes		14,706	100.0

2022 Colorado House of Representatives election, 58th District
Party	Candidate	Votes	%
Republican	Marc Catlin (incumbent)	26,289	56.80
Democratic	Kevin Stanley Kuns	19,996	43.20
Total votes		46,285	100.0

=== District 59 ===
59th District Democratic primary
Party	Candidate	Votes	%
Democratic	Barbara McLachlan	7,372	100.0
Total votes		7,372	100.0

59th District Republican primary
Party	Candidate	Votes	%
Republican	Shelli Shaw	11,664	100.0
Total votes		11,664	100.0

2022 Colorado House of Representatives election, 59th District
Party	Candidate	Votes	%
Democratic	Barbara McLachlan	26,436	56.76
Republican	Shelli Shaw	20,139	43.24
Total votes		46,575	100.0

=== District 60 ===
60th District Democratic primary
Party	Candidate	Votes	%
Democratic	Kathryn Green	5,941	100.0
Total votes		5,941	100.0

60th District Republican primary
Party	Candidate	Votes	%
Republican	Stephanie Luck (incumbent)	14,815	100.0
Total votes		14,815	100.0

2022 Colorado House of Representatives election, 60th District
Party	Candidate	Votes	%
Republican	Stephanie Luck (incumbent)	29,800	68.78
Democratic	Kathryn Green	13,526	31.22
Total votes		43,326	100.0

=== District 61 ===
61st District Democratic primary
Party	Candidate	Votes	%
Democratic	Eliza Hamrick	7,387	100.0
Total votes		7,387	100.0

61st District Republican primary
Party	Candidate	Votes	%
Republican	Dave Woolever	8,586	100.0
Total votes		8,586	100.0

2022 Colorado House of Representatives election, 61st district
Party	Candidate	Votes	%
Democratic	Eliza Hamrick	20,947	50.36
Republican	Dave Woolever	19,775	47.54
Libertarian	Kevin Gulbranson	876	2.11
Total votes		41,598	100.0

=== District 62 ===
62nd District Democratic primary
Party	Candidate	Votes	%
Democratic	Matthew Martinez	8,216	100.0
Total votes		8,216	100.0

62nd District Republican primary
Party	Candidate	Votes	%
Republican	Carol Riggenbach	4,853	60.75
Republican	Ryan Williams	3,136	39.25
Total votes		7,989	100.0

2022 Colorado House of Representatives election, 62nd district
Party	Candidate	Votes	%
Democratic	Matthew Martinez	17,304	55.61
Republican	Carol riggenbach	13,812	44.39
Total votes		31,116	100.0

=== District 63 ===
63rd District Republican primary
Party	Candidate	Votes	%
Republican	Richard Holtorf (incumbent)	11,895	71.44
Republican	Jessie Vance	4,755	28.56
Total votes		16,650	100.0

2022 Colorado House of Representatives election, 63rd District
Party	Candidate	Votes	%
Republican	Richard Holtorf (incumbent)	29,793	100.0
Total votes		29,793	100.0

=== District 64 ===
64th District Democratic primary
Party	Candidate	Votes	%
Democratic	Richard Webster	5,035	100.0
Total votes		5,035	100.0

64th District Republican primary
Party	Candidate	Votes	%
Republican	Ryan Armagost	10,714	100.0
Total votes		10,714	100.0

2022 Colorado House of Representatives election, 64th District
Party	Candidate	Votes	%
Republican	Ryan Armagost	25,216	62.65
Democratic	Richard Webster	15,033	37.35
Total votes		40,249	100.0

=== District 65 ===
65th District Democratic primary
Party	Candidate	Votes	%
Democratic	Lisa Chollet	5,505	100.0
Total votes		5,505	100.0

65th District Republican primary
Party	Candidate	Votes	%
Republican	Mike Lynch (incumbent)	12,025	100.0
Total votes		12,025	100.0

2022 Colorado House of Representatives election, 65th District
Party	Candidate	Votes	%
Republican	Mike Lynch (incumbent)	29,328	62.41
Democratic	Lisa Choller	17,664	37.59
Total votes		46,992	100.0
