= Slaugh =

Slaugh is a surname. Notable people with the surname include:

- Dean Slaugh (1929–2009), American paralympic archer
- Randy Slaugh (born 1987), American music producer
- Scott Slaugh, American politician
