= Matthew Martínez =

Matthew Martínez may refer to:

- Matthew G. Martínez, member of the U.S. House of Representatives from California
- Matthew Martinez (Colorado politician), member of the Colorado House of Representatives
