= Colin Larson =

American politician

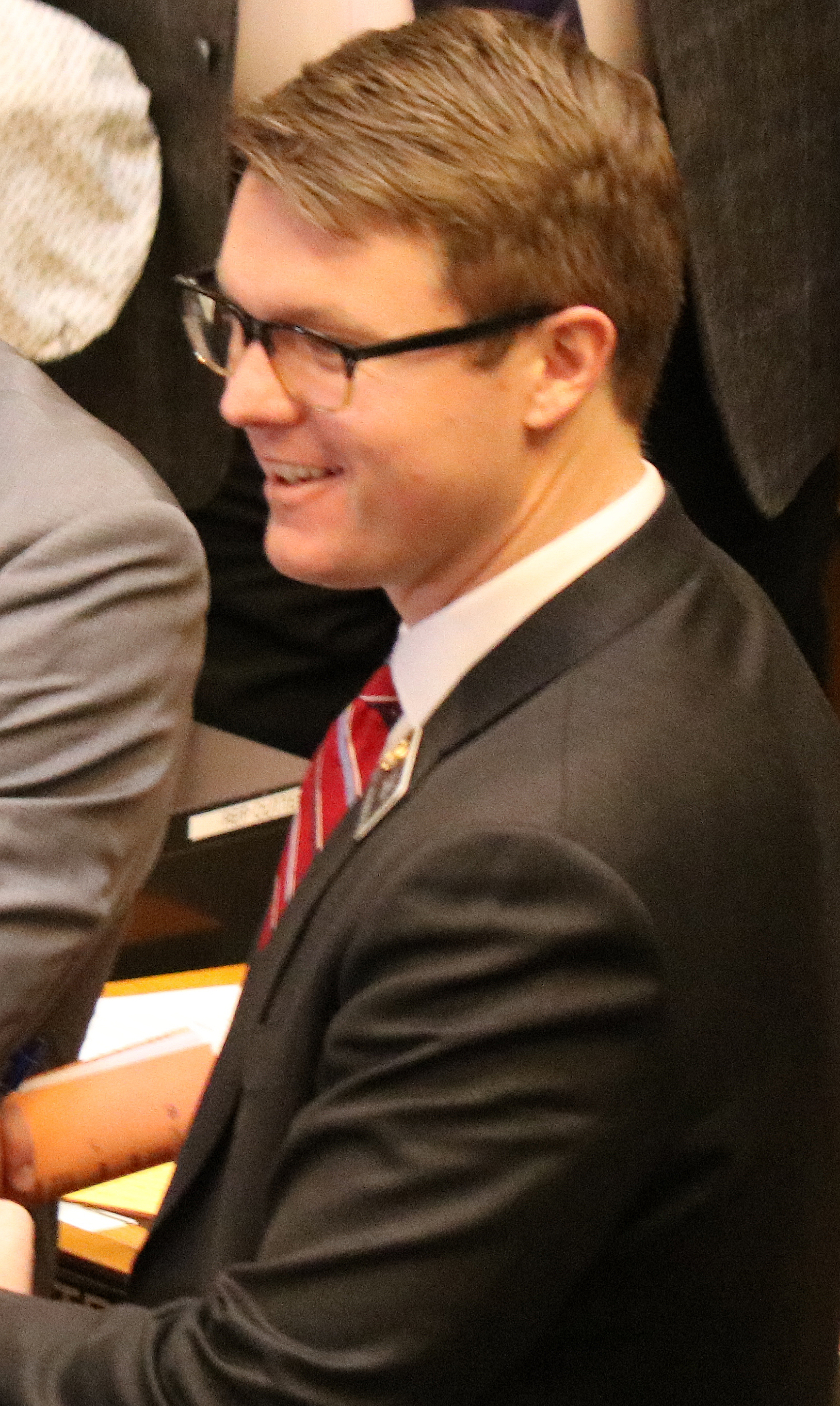
- Larson in 2020

Member of the Colorado House of Representatives from the 22nd district
- In office January 4, 2019 – January 9, 2023
- Preceded by: Justin Everett
- Succeeded by: Ken DeGraaf

Personal details
- Party: Republican
- Website: www.colinforcolorado.com

Colin Larson is a former state representative from Littleton, Colorado. A Republican, Larson represented Colorado House of Representatives District 22, which encompassed the southern Jefferson County communities of Bow Mar, Columbine, Dakota Ridge, Ken Caryl, and Littleton.

== Background ==
Larson earned a political science degree from Colorado College.

== Election ==
Larson was first elected as a state representative in the 2018 general elections. In that election, he defeated his Democratic Party opponent, winning 53.63% of the vote. In the 2022 Colorado House elections, Larson was redistricted to the 25th district and lost his re-election bid to Tammy Story in what media outlets considered an unexpected loss. Larson was poised to become the House minority leader in the upcoming legislative session.
