= Colorado's 25th House of Representatives district =

American legislative district

Colorado's 25th State House of Representatives district
Representative
Tammy Story; D–Evergreen
- Demographics: 85% White; 0% Black; 8% Hispanic; 2% Asian; 0% Native American; 4% Multiracial
- Population (2024): 87,271

Colorado's 25th House of Representatives district is one of 65 districts in the Colorado House of Representatives. It has been represented by Tammy Story since 2023.
