= Colorado's 26th House of Representatives district =

American legislative district

Colorado's 26th State House of Representatives district
Representative
Meghan Lukens; D–Steamboat Springs
- Demographics: 70% White; 0% Black; 22% Hispanic; 1% Asian; 0% Native American; 6% Multiracial
- Population (2024): 91,502

Colorado's 26th House of Representatives district is one of 65 districts in the Colorado House of Representatives. It has been represented by Meghan Lukens since 2023.
