= Colorado's 62nd House of Representatives district =

American legislative district

Colorado's 62nd State House of Representatives district
Representative
Matthew Martinez; D–Monte Vista
- Demographics: 44% White; 1% Black; 50% Hispanic; 1% Asian; 1% Native American; 3% Multiracial
- Population (2024): 90,443

Colorado's 62nd House of Representatives district is one of 65 districts in the Colorado House of Representatives. It has been represented by Matthew Martinez since 2023.
