= Colorado's 57th House of Representatives district =

American legislative district

Colorado's 57th State House of Representatives district
Representative
| Elizabeth Velasco; D–Glenwood Springs |
- Demographics: 66% White; 1% Black; 28% Hispanic; 1% Asian; 0% Native American; 4% Multiracial
- Population (2024): 87,932

Colorado's 57th House of Representatives district is one of 65 districts in the Colorado House of Representatives. It has been represented by Elizabeth Velasco since 2023.
