= Colorado Mountain College =

Public college in western Colorado, U.S.

Coordinates: 39.5465°N 107.3244°W

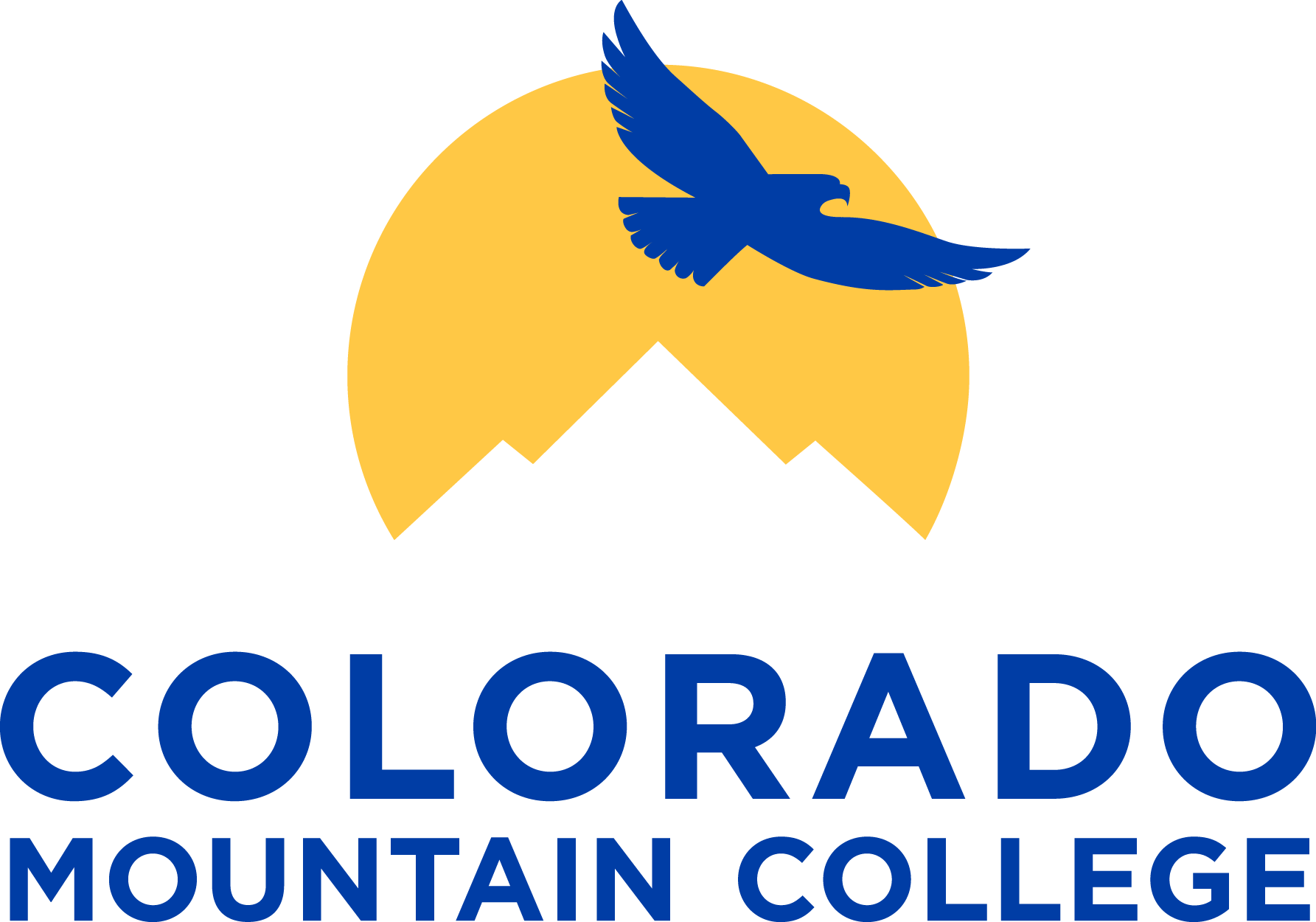
- Motto: "Elevate Your Future"
- Type: Public community college
- Established: 1967
- Accreditation: HLC
- President: Dr. Matt Gianneschi
- Students: Approximately 14,000 annually
- Undergraduates: 4,904
- Location: Colorado, United States
- Campus: Rural
- Colours: Blue, yellow
- Mascot: Swoop the Eagle
- Website: coloradomtn.edu

Colorado Mountain College (CMC) is a public community college with multiple campuses in western Colorado, and headquartered in Glenwood Springs, Colorado.

Founded in 1965, the institution offers numerous associate degrees, eight bachelor's degrees and career-technical certificates. Approximately 14,000 students take on-campus or online classes every year.

The CMC district includes the following counties in Colorado: Eagle, Grand, Jackson, Lake, Garfield, Pitkin, Summit, and Routt. The state-designated service area includes the following counties: Grand, Jackson, and Chaffee.

CMC has eight community campuses. CMC has three full-service residential campuses in Leadville, Steamboat Springs, and Spring Valley at Glenwood Springs. Students have access to residence halls, cafeterias, recreation facilities, and libraries. Students may participate in recreational and educational activities through student clubs, honor societies, a theatre company, and sports teams.

== History ==
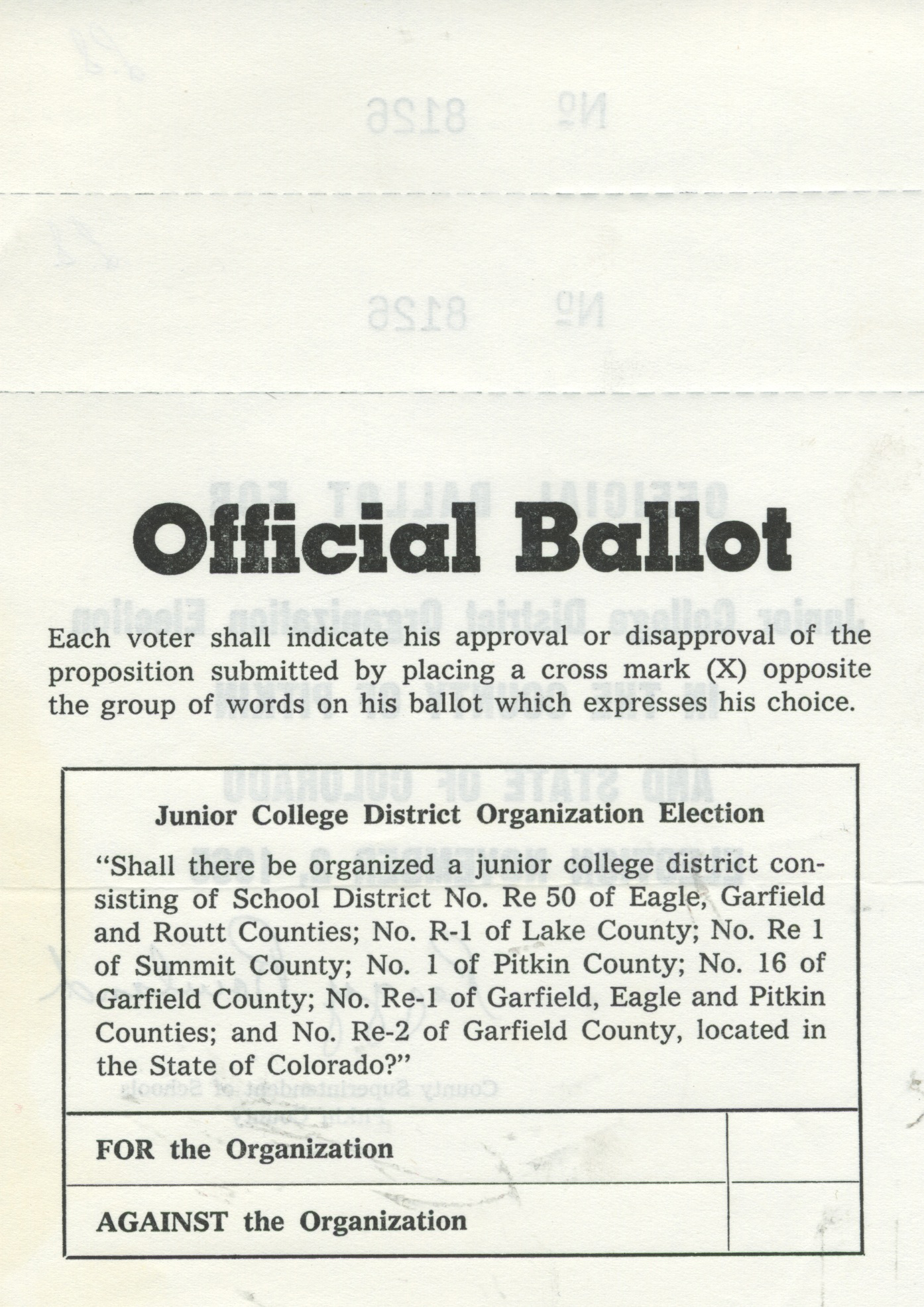
Official ballot from CMC founding in 1965

On November 2, 1965, voters of five Colorado counties approved the formation of a college district including the Eagle, Garfield, Routt, Lake, Summit and Pitkin counties. The junior college plan was unanimously approved by the State Board of Education and the name "Colorado Mountain College", suggested by the governing committee member, Harold Koonce, was immediately adopted.

The residential campuses of Leadville and Spring Valley at Glenwood Springs were the first ones built, and the first classes started in the fall of 1967. Dr. Joe Davenport was the first president of the institution. Davenport crashed his single-engine plane and died while attempting to land in Glenwood Springs shortly after the opening of the two campuses.

In 1972, Summit County offered its first courses, followed by expansions in Rifle, Salida and Buena Vista. In 1974, the college received full accreditation by the North Central Association of Schools and Colleges.

In 2012, The Isaacson School for Communication, Arts, & Media opened at the Spring Valley campus. That same year, an academic center was opened at CMC Steamboat Springs.

In November 2019, the Salida and Poncha Springs communities voted to join the Colorado Mountain College special taxing district, while simultaneously the existing CMC district also voted to have them join, creating the newest CMC location.

In 2021, Colorado Mountain College was designated as a Hispanic-Serving Institution (HSI) by the federal government after reaching enrollment of 25% or more Latino students.

== Community campuses ==
=== Aspen ===
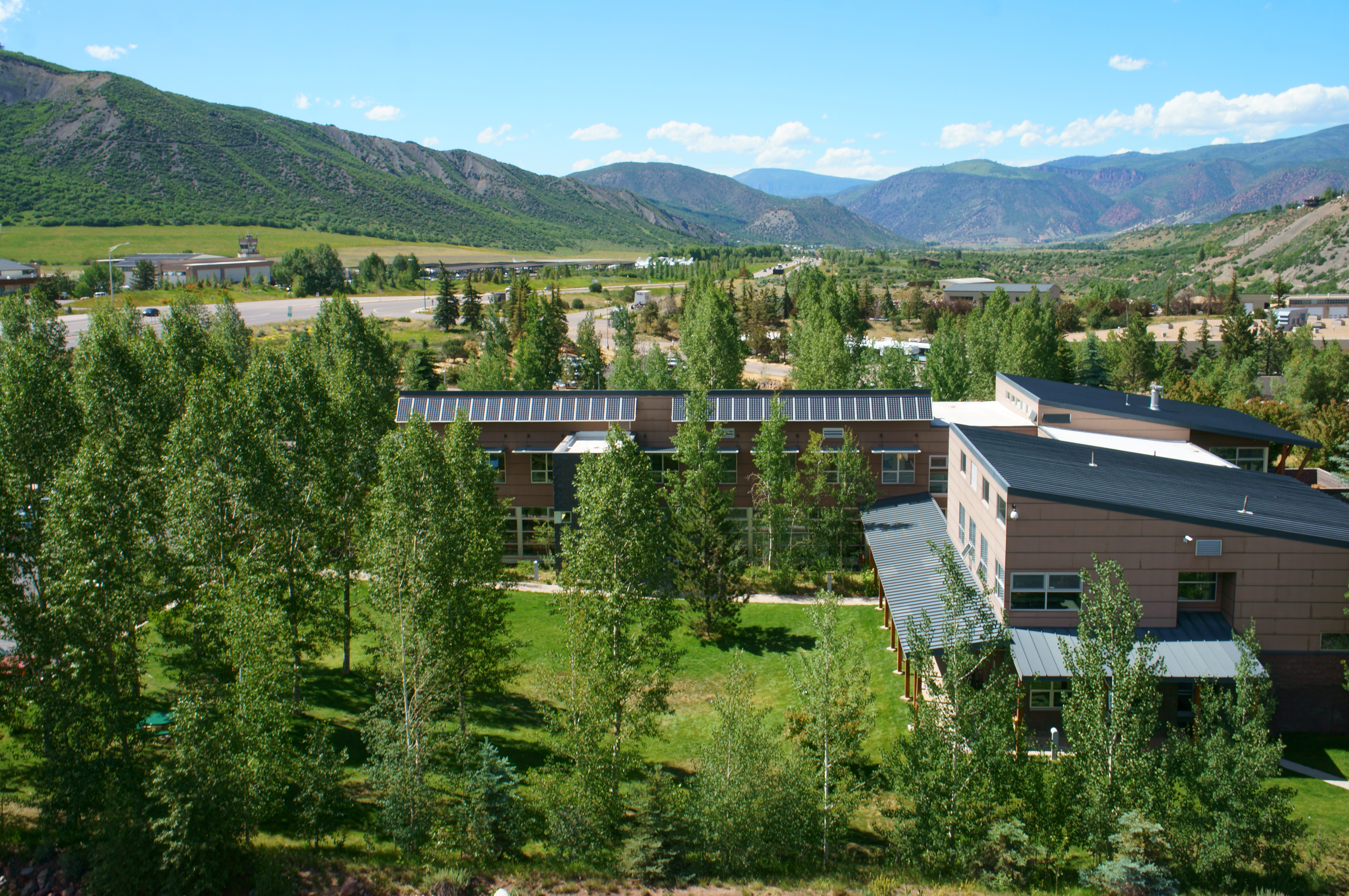
CMC Aspen campus

The Aspen campus is home to Aspen-Santa Fe Ballet.

=== Breckenridge and Dillon ===
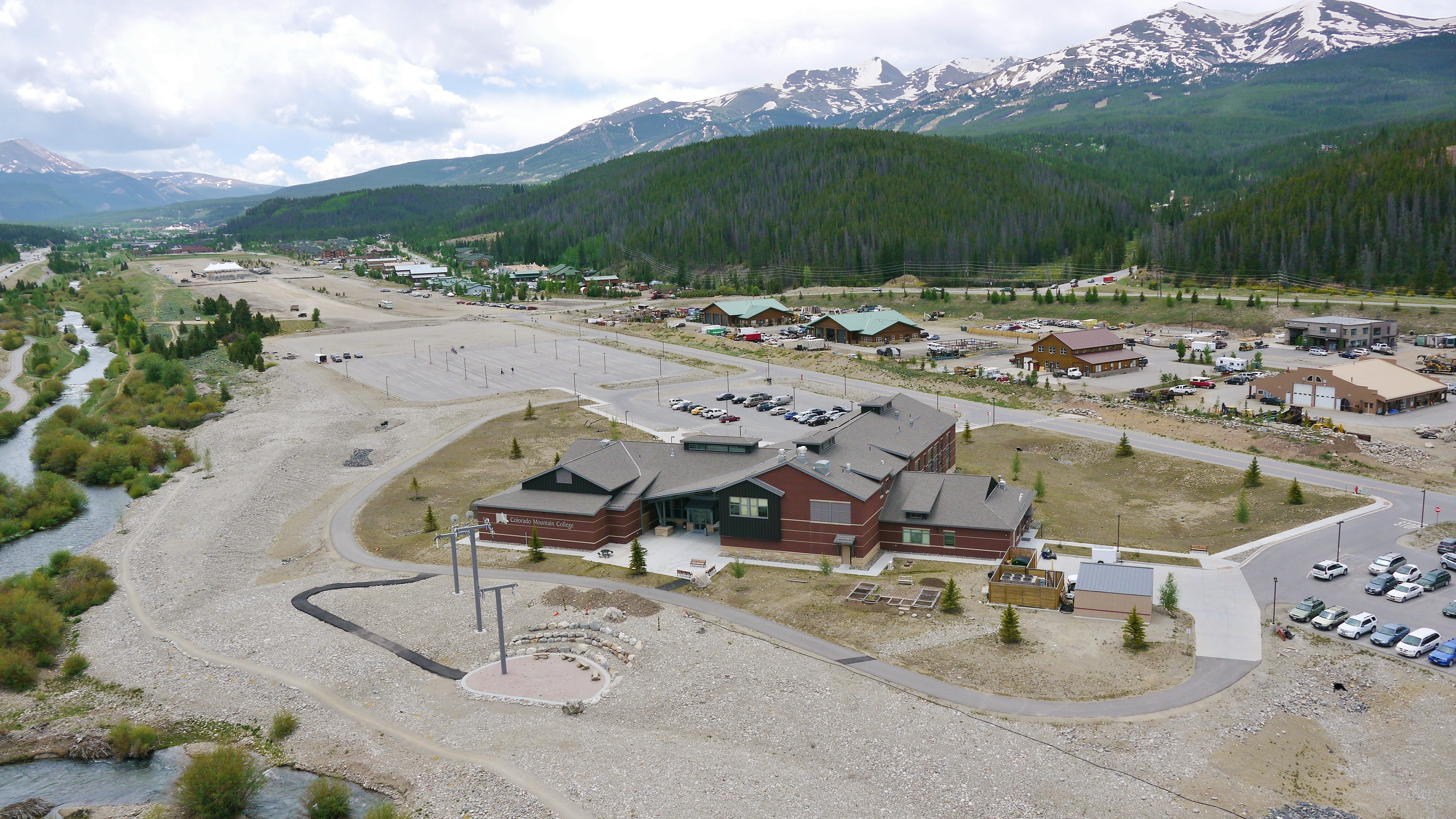
CMC Breckenridge campus view

The Breckenridge and Dillon campuses are home to CMC's Culinary Arts program, one of the few apprentice-based culinary programs in the country.

=== Carbondale ===
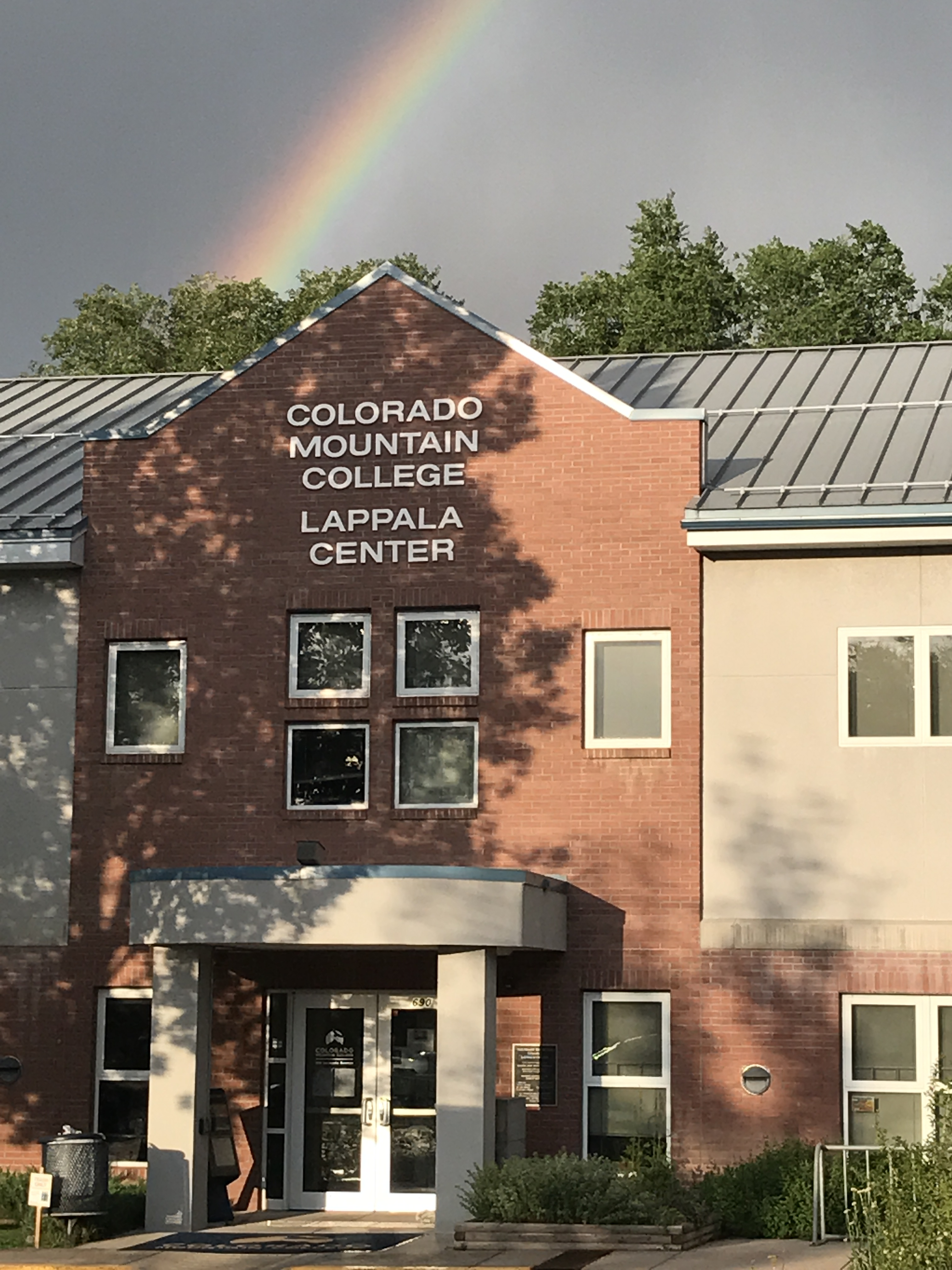
Lappala building at the CMC Carbondale campus

The Carbondale campus is the Lappala Center and is named after its land donors, Paul and Ginny Lappala.

=== Glenwood Springs ===
The Glenwood Springs campus.

=== Rifle ===
The Rifle campus includes a solar farm that generates 33% of campus power.

=== Salida ===
The Salida campus is the newest CMC campus.

=== Vail Valley at Edwards ===
The Edwards campus.

== Residential campuses ==
=== Leadville ===
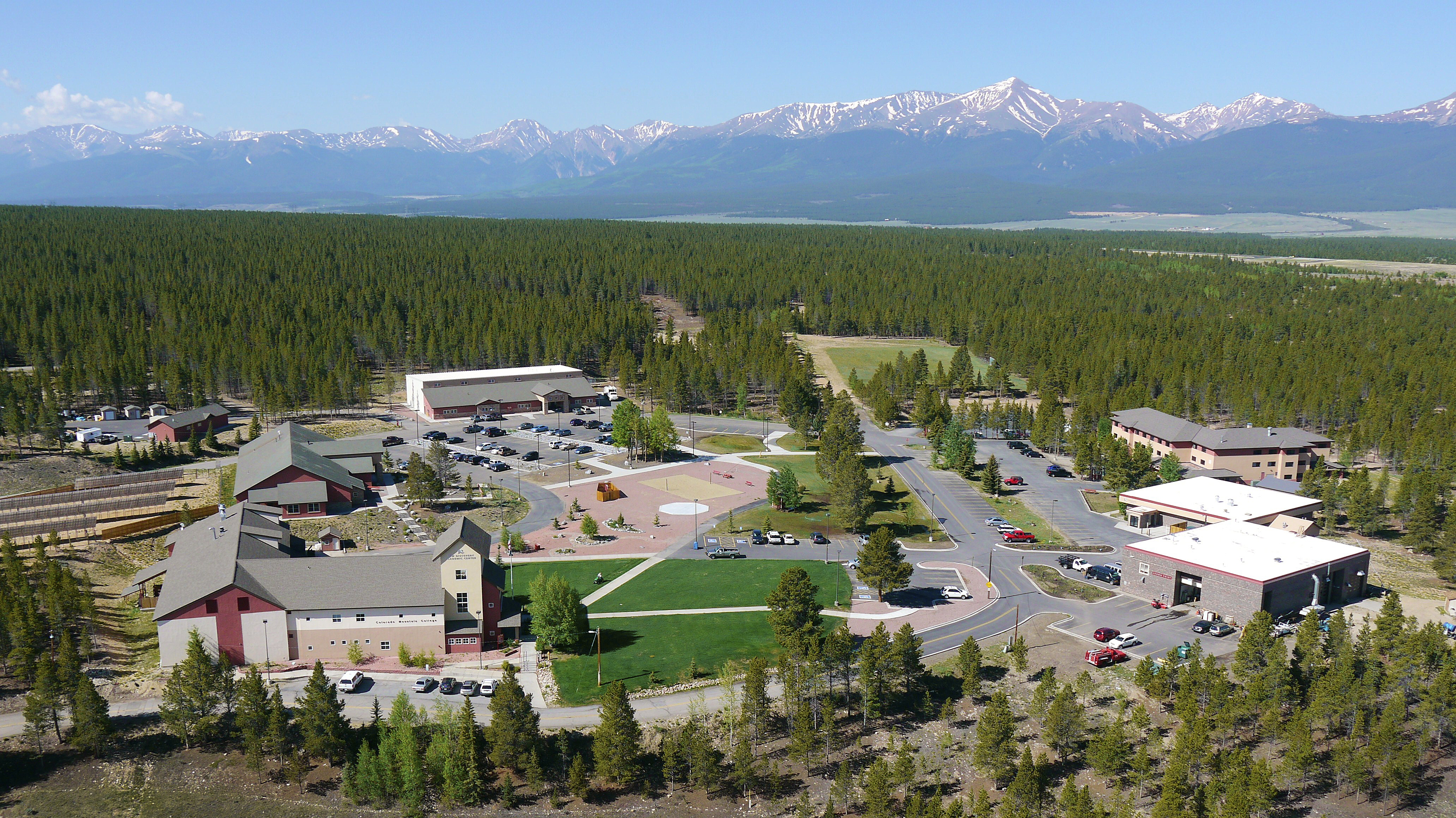
CMC Leadville campus

The Leadville residential campus was one of the first Colorado Mountain College campuses, built in 1967, and is the highest elevation college campus in the country at 10,152 feet above sea level.

=== Spring Valley at Glenwood Springs ===
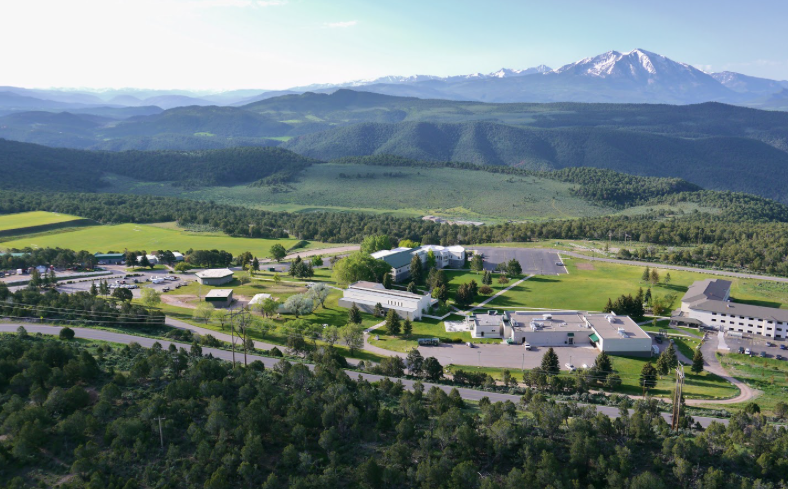
CMC Spring Valley campus

The Spring Valley residential campus is one of first Colorado Mountain College campuses, built in 1967. The campus is home to the Isaacson School for Communication.

=== Steamboat Springs ===
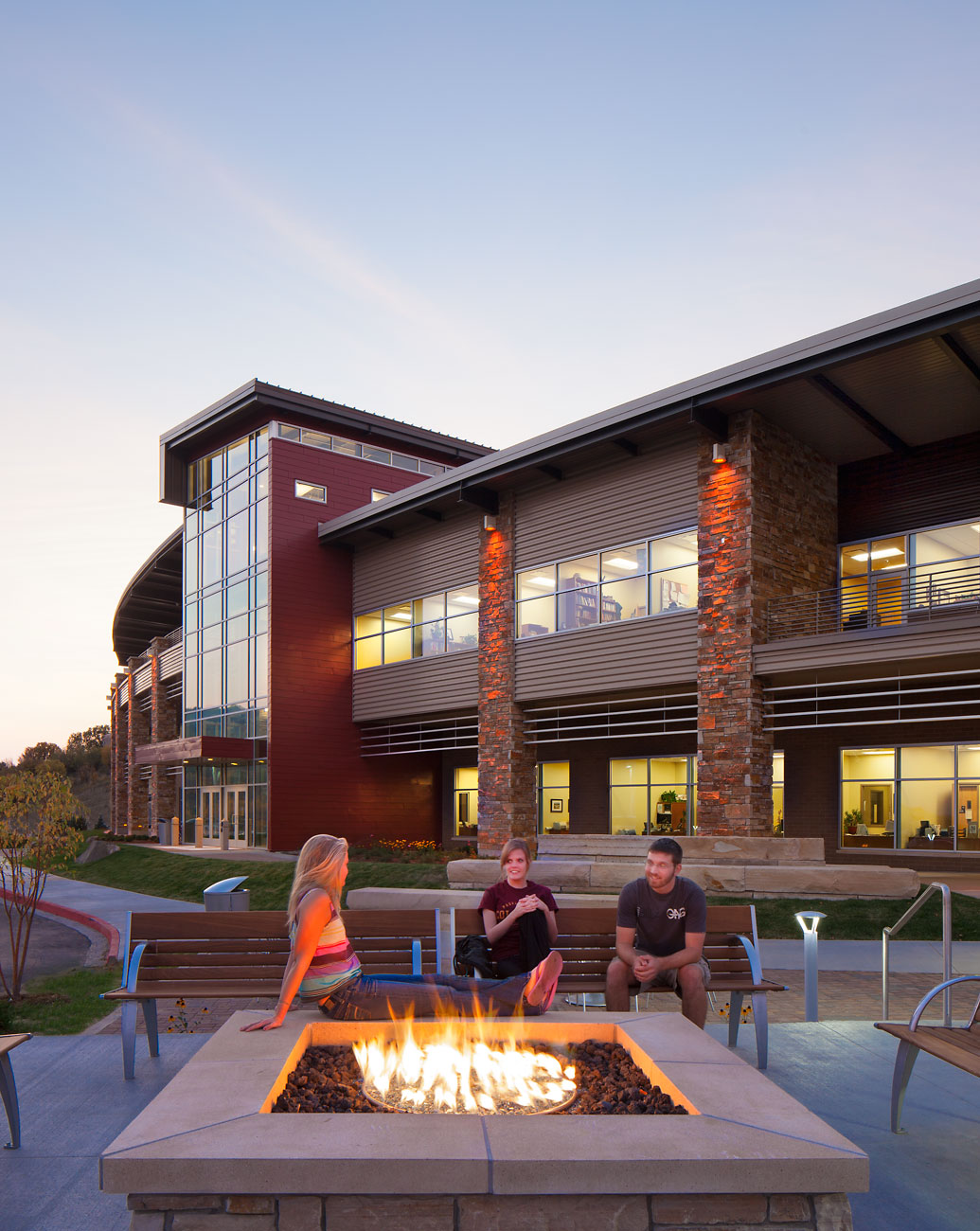
CMC Steamboat Springs campus

The Steamboat Springs residential campus hosts the Snowports Industries America (SIA) certificate tests for snowsports industry professionals.

== Academics ==
Colorado Mountain College offers eight bachelor's degrees, 54 associate degrees, and 77 certificates of one-year or less. The college also provides GED and ESL classes, continuing education, community education classes, and workshops to Colorado mountain communities. Most of its academic programs meet the requirements of the Colorado State Guaranteed Transfer Courses.

=== Community Education (non-credit) ===
Students can choose from more than 300 different community education (non-credit) classes.

=== Concurrent enrollment ===
High school students in CMC districts can earn college credits from Colorado Mountain College before graduating high school through the Colorado Concurrent Enrollment Programs Act (CEPA). One can take dual college and high school credits in commonly required classes as English, math, speech, foreign language, computer science and psychology.

The College-Level Examination Program (CLEP) at Colorado Mountain College, also gives students of any age the opportunity to demonstrate college-level achievement through a program of exams in undergraduate college courses.

=== Tuition ===
CMC offers three tuition rates based on residence status: In-District, In-State, and Out-of-State tuition. Other special tuition rates include a Veterans & Military Families Discount Rate and Western Undergraduate Exchange rate.

== Isaacson School for Communication, Arts & Media ==
The school was named after the author and journalist, Walter Isaacson, former president and CEO of the Aspen Institute, a nonpartisan educational and policy studies organization based in Washington, D.C., and Aspen, Colorado. Isaacson is also former chairman and CEO of Cable News Network (CNN) and former managing editor of Time magazine.

Notable graduates of the Isaacson School include Pat Davison, who was part of a team awarded the Pulitzer Prize in 2000.

== Sopris Theatre ==
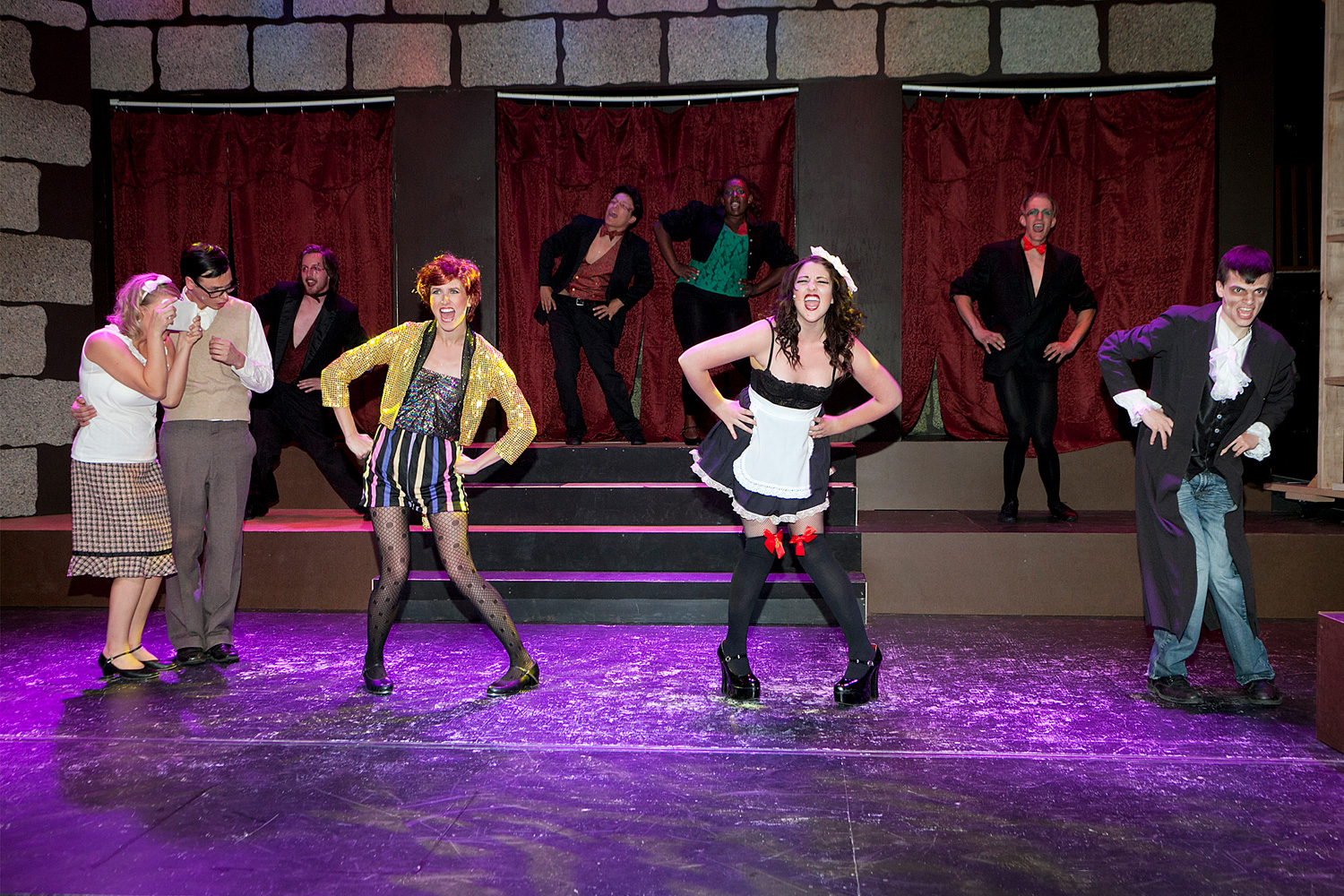
Students, faculty and community participate in theatre productions

The company usually performs three to five theatre productions each season, in its theatre that seats 100 people at the Colorado Mountain College Spring Valley at Glenwood Springs campus.

== Sustainability ==
Colorado Mountain College is one of the nine postsecondary institutions in the US, and the only in Colorado, to receive the 2017 U.S. Department of Education Green Ribbon for Schools Postsecondary Sustainability Award. In January 2019, the U.S. Green Building Council and Second Nature honored Colorado Mountain College as one of eight U.S. institutions to receive the 2018 Higher Education Climate Leadership Awards. CMC's award, an honorable mention, is for cross-sector collaboration, recognizing the college's students, faculty and administration for partnering with many other organizations to reduce greenhouse gas emissions, monitor changes in climate and support land preservation.

Some of the sustainability efforts applied to all its campuses are: recycling, conduct professional energy audits, replace incandescent light bulbs with compact fluorescent or LED bulbs, replaced conventional thermostats with programmable, use green cleaning products and paper products made from recycled fibers.

== Notable alumni ==
- Chris Klug, three-time Olympic snowboarder who has eleven US national snowboarding titles; won a bronze medal at the 2002 Winter Olympics
- Alex Ferreira, American freestyle halfpipe skier; won a Gold medal at the 2026 Winter Olympics in Cortina
- Johnny Spillane, Olympic silver medalist in Nordic combined
- Katie Uhlaender, four-time Olympic skeleton racer
- Elizabeth Velasco, member of the Colorado House of Representatives from the 57th district
