= Ryan Armagost =

American politician

Member of the Colorado House of Representatives from the 64th district
- In office January 9, 2023 – August 21, 2025
- Preceded by: Richard Holtorf
- Succeeded by: Scott Slaugh

Personal details
- Party: Republican
- Children: 1
- Profession: Marine corps and Army National Guard veteran, sheriff's deputy, firefighter
- Website: www.armagost64.com

Ryan Armagost is an American former politician who represented Colorado House of Representatives District 64 from January 2023, until his resignation in August 2025. District 64 includes parts of Larimer and Weld counties in Colorado and includes the communities of Greeley, Johnstown, Berthoud, Millikin and Mead. Armagost is a Republican.

In April 2025, Republican Representative Richard Armagost shared a photo of Democratic Representative Yara Zokaie of Fort Collins in a Republican House caucus group chat on the encrypted messaging app Signal, and the photo was shortly after circulated on social media leading to blatant sexual harassment and threats against her and her school age children -- Armagost resigned from his seat in the Colorado House of Representative on August 21, 2025, while facing a pending censure resolution against him for this incident.

== Background ==
Currently, Armagost works as a firearms instructor and in executive protection. He recently also worked for two years as a volunteer firefighter in Evans, Colorado. Before that, he worked for ten years as a Larimer County sheriff's deputy. He is a veteran of the United States Marine Corps and the Army National Guard.

== Elections ==
=== 2022 ===
In the 2022 Colorado House of Representatives election, Armagost defeated his Democratic Party opponent, winning 62.65% of the total votes cast.

=== 2024 ===
Armagost ran for re-election in 2024. In the Republican primary election held June 25, 2024, he ran unopposed. In the general election held November 5, 2024, Armagost defeated his Democratic Party opponent, winning 63.50% of the total votes cast.
