= Don Wilson (Colorado politician) =

American politician

Member of the Colorado House of Representatives from the 20th district
- In office January 9, 2023 – January 8, 2025
- Preceded by: Redistricted
- Succeeded by: Jarvis Caldwell

Member of the Colorado House of Representatives from the 19th district
- In office November 15, 2022 – January 9, 2023
- Preceded by: Tim Geitner
- Succeeded by: Redistricted

Personal details
- Party: Republican

Don Wilson is a former state representative from Monument, Colorado. A Republican, Wilson represented Colorado House of Representatives District 20, which includes a portion of unincorporated El Paso County and the communities of Air Force Academy, Black Forest, Gleneagle, Monument, Palmer Lake, and Woodmoor. Previously, Wilson served as the mayor of Monument, Colorado, and before that he served on the town's board of trustees. He is originally from Littleton, Colorado.

== Appointment to the Colorado State House ==
Following the resignation of former district 19 state representative Tim Geitner on October 7, 2022, a vacancy committee met to select a replacement to fill out his term. However, the committee was unable to achieve a quorum before the 30-day deadline. In such cases, the governor is then required to appoint someone to fill out the term. Governor Jared Polis selected Wilson on November 9, 2022.

== Election to the Colorado State House ==
In 2022, Wilson was a candidate for state house district 20, a new district established after 2020 reapportionment. In the 2022 elections, Wilson ran unopposed in both the primary and general elections. So when the Colorado General Assembly convened on January 9, 2023, Wilson finished his term in the former district 19 and began his term in the new district 20. The new district 20 is geographically smaller than the old district 19, but both include the town of Monument.

In November 2023, Wilson announced he was not seeking reelection to his state house seat in 2024. Instead, in 2024 he ran for a seat on the El Paso County, Colorado County Commission, to represent the third district. However he was defeated in the Republican Primary on June 25, 2024. In the primary election, candidate Bill Wysong defeated Wilson and two others.
