= Scott Slaugh =

American politician

Member of the Colorado House of Representatives from the 64th district
- Incumbent
- Assumed office September 23, 2025
- Preceded by: Ryan Armagost

Personal details
- Party: Republican

Scott Slaugh is an American politician who was elected member of the Colorado House of Representatives for the 64th district in 2025. He was appointed to replace Ryan Armagost.
