= Ken DeGraaf =

American politician

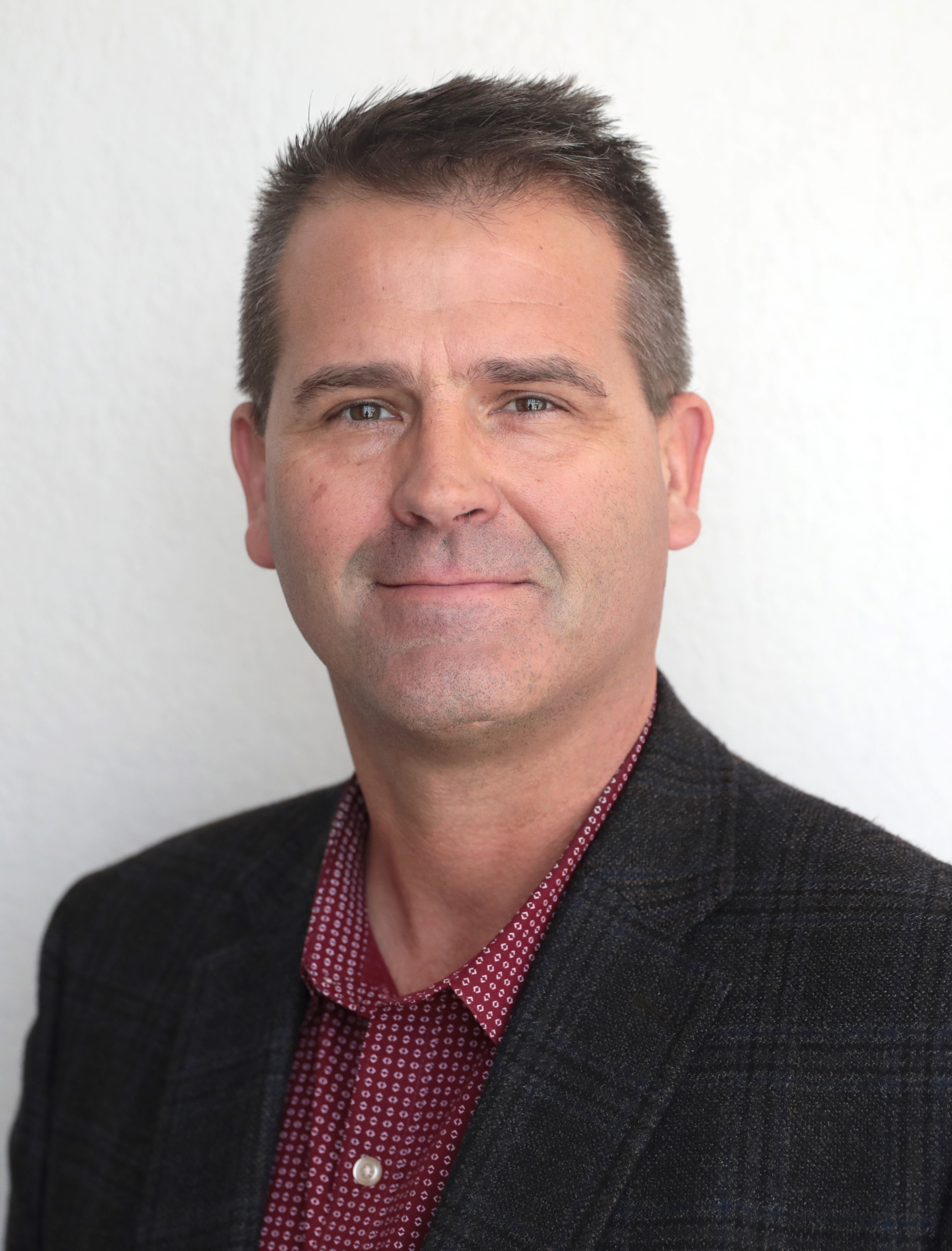

Member of the Colorado House of Representatives from the 22nd district
- Incumbent
- Assumed office January 9, 2023
- Preceded by: Colin Larson

Personal details
- Party: Republican
- Profession: Commercial airline pilot
- Website: kendegraaf4hd22.com

Kenneth G. DeGraaf is a state representative from Colorado Springs, Colorado. A Republican, DeGraaf represents Colorado House of Representatives District 22, which includes a portion of northeast Colorado Springs in El Paso County.

== Background ==
DeGraaf is a 30-year veteran of the United States Air Force. Now he works as a commercial airline pilot and lives in Colorado Springs. He studied engineering mechanics at the United States Air Force Academy and later earned a master's degree in the same field from Columbia University, where he was awarded a Guggenheim fellowship.

== Elections ==
=== 2022 ===
In the 2022 Colorado House of Representatives election, DeGraaf defeated his Democratic Party and Libertarian Party opponents, winning 57.66% of the total votes cast.

=== 2024 ===
DeGraaf ran for re-election in 2024. In the Republican primary election held June 25, 2024, he ran unopposed. In the general election held November 5, 2024, DeGraaf defeated one Democratic Party opponent and one independent opponent, winning 56.62% of the vote.
