= Colorado's 7th House of Representatives district =

American legislative district

Colorado's 7th State House of Representatives district
Representative
Jennifer Bacon; D–Denver
- Demographics: 20% White; 23% Black; 47% Hispanic; 5% Asian; 0% Native American; 2% Multiracial
- Population (2021): 96,263

Colorado's 7th House of Representatives district is one of 65 districts in the Colorado House of Representatives. It has been represented by Democrat Jennifer Bacon since 2021.

== Geography ==
District 7 is located in the north east of Denver and contains Denver International Airport.

== Members ==
- Terrance Carroll (2003–2011)
- Angela Williams (2011–2017)
- James Coleman (2017–2021)
- Jennifer Bacon (since 2021)
