= Eliza Hamrick =

American politician

Member of the Colorado House of Representatives from the 61st district
- Incumbent
- Assumed office January 9, 2023
- Preceded by: Redistricted

Personal details
- Party: Democratic
- Education: University of Arizona

Eliza Hamrick is an American politician and former educator who is a member of the Colorado House of Representatives from the 61st district. The district is located in Arapahoe and Douglas counties and includes portions of Aurora, Centennial and unincorporated areas nearby. She was elected in 2022 and assumed office in January 2023.

== Background ==
Hamrick worked as a high school teacher at Cherry Creek School District for over 30 years. She graduated from the University of Arizona and moved to Colorado, where she became a teacher.

== Political career ==
In the 2022 general election, Hamrick defeated the Republican and Libertarian candidates. Her legislative priorities include education, supporting working families and working on gun legislation.

=== Tenure ===
As of the 2023 legislative session, Hamrick is a member of the Education Committee, and the Public & Behavioral Health & Human Services committee.

== Personal life ==
Hamrick has been married to her husband, an Air Force veteran for over 30 years and has children and grandchildren.
