= Jenny Willford =

American politician

Member of the Colorado House of Representatives from the 34th district
- Incumbent
- Assumed office January 9, 2023
- Preceded by: Kyle Mullica

Personal details
- Party: Democratic
- Education: University of Wyoming (BA); University of Manchester (MA)

Jenny Willford is an American politician serving as a member of the Colorado House of Representatives for the 34th district. Elected in November 2022, she assumed office on January 9, 2023.

== Education ==
Willford earned a dual Bachelor of Arts degree in women/gender studies and international/global studies from the University of Wyoming in 2009 and a Master of Arts in human rights and political science from the University of Manchester.

== Career ==
Willford worked as a legislative associate at Siegel Public Affairs from 2012 to 2014 and as the executive director of Emerge Colorado from 2014 to 2017. Willford operated her own consulting firm from 2017 to 2019 and joined the Colorado Sierra Club as the organization's decarbonization program manager in 2019. She was elected to the Northglenn City Council in 2017 and also served as mayor pro tem. Willford was elected to the Colorado House of Representatives in November 2022.

== Electoral history ==
2022 Colorado 34th State House district election
Primary election
Party	Candidate	Votes	%
Democratic	Jenny Willford	4,679	58.69
Democratic	Sam Nizam	3,294	41.31
Total votes		7,973	100.00
General election
Democratic	Jenny Willford	17,601	54.09
Republican	Kevin Allen	14,029	43.12
Libertarian	Rob Stutz	908	2.79
Total votes		32,538	100.00

2024 Colorado 34th State House district election
Primary election
Party	Candidate	Votes	%
Democratic	Jenny Willford (incumbent)	5,661	100.00
Total votes		5,661	100.00
General election
Democratic	Jenny Willford (incumbent)	21,326	50.64
Republican	Craig Sullivan	18,864	44.79
Center	Alexander Winkler	971	2.31
Independent	Mark Bromley	952	2.26
Total votes		42,113	100.00
