= Jennifer Bacon =

American attorney, educator, and politician

Member of the Colorado House of Representatives from the 7th district
- Incumbent
- Assumed office January 13, 2021
- Preceded by: James Coleman

Personal details
- Born: 1982 or 1983 (age 43–44)
- Party: Democratic
- Education: Tulane University (BS); Florida International University (MS); College of William and Mary (JD)

Jennifer Bacon (born 1982/1983) is an American attorney, educator, and politician serving as a member of the Colorado House of Representatives from the 7th district. Elected in 2020, she assumed office on January 13, 2021.

== Education ==
Bacon earned a Bachelor of Science degree in management, business, and politics from Tulane University, a Master of Science in elementary education and curriculum from Florida International University, and a Juris Doctor from William & Mary Law School.

== Career ==
Prior to entering politics, Bacon worked as an educator. She was the dean of students at the Denver School of Science and Technology. She was also the managing director of Teach For America and director of the Denver Public Schools. Bacon was elected to the Colorado House of Representatives in 2020. She assumed office on January 13, 2021, succeeding James Coleman.

In 2022, Bacon was selected to become assistant majority leader of the state House for the 2023 legislative session.
