= Tammy Story =

American politician from Colorado

Member of the Colorado House of Representatives from the 25th district
- Incumbent
- Assumed office January 9, 2023
- Preceded by: Lisa Cutter

Member of the Colorado Senate from the 16th district
- In office January 4, 2019 – January 9, 2023
- Preceded by: Tim Neville
- Succeeded by: Chris Kolker

Personal details
- Born: February 24, 1959 (age 67) West Germany
- Party: Democratic

Tamara Lee Story (born February 24, 1959) is an American politician. She serves as a member of the Colorado House of Representatives, representing District 25. Previously, she served as a member of the Colorado Senate, representing the 16th district in Jefferson County.

== Political career ==
=== Elections ===
Story was first elected to the state senate in the general election on November 6, 2018, winning 55 percent of the vote over 42 percent of Republican incumbent Tim Neville. Story ran for State House district 25 in the 2022 election. Story defeated incumbent Colin Larson in the election, who had represented the 22nd district prior to redistricting. Story was re-elected in 2024.
