= Meghan Lukens =

American politician

Member of the Colorado House of Representatives from the 26th district
- Incumbent
- Assumed office January 9, 2023
- Preceded by: Dylan Roberts

Personal details
- Born: Steamboat Springs, Colorado, U.S.
- Party: Democratic
- Education: University of Colorado, Boulder (BA); University of Colorado; Denver (MA)

Meghan Lukens is an American politician and educator serving as a member of the Colorado House of Representatives for the 26th district. Elected in November 2022, she assumed office on January 9 2023.

== Early life and education ==
Born and raised in Steamboat Springs, Colorado, Lukens graduated from Steamboat Springs High School. She earned a Bachelor of Arts degree in history from the University of Colorado Boulder and a Master of Arts in educational leadership from the University of Colorado Denver.

== Career ==
Lukens began her career as a student teacher at Niwot High School in 2015. She worked as a substitute teacher at Steamboat Springs High School in 2016 and joined Peak to Peak Charter School in 2017. Since 2021, she has worked as a social studies teacher at Steamboat Springs High School. Lukens was elected to the Colorado House of Representatives in November 2022 and assumed office on January 9, 2023.
