= Elizabeth Velasco =

American politician

Member of the Colorado House of Representatives from the 57th district
- Incumbent
- Assumed office January 9, 2023
- Preceded by: Perry Will

Personal details
- Born: Mexico
- Party: Democratic
- Education: Colorado Mountain College (AA)

Elizabeth Velasco is an American politician who is a member of the Colorado House of Representatives for the 57th district. Elected in November 2022, she assumed office on January 9, 2023. She is a member of the Democratic Party.

== Early life and education ==
Velasco's family immigrated to Eagle County, Colorado, from Mexico when she was 16 years old. She attended Battle Mountain High School in Edwards, Colorado, and went on to earn an associate's degree in culinary arts from Colorado Mountain College. Velasco is the first Mexican-born member of the Colorado House of Representatives.

== Career ==
Outside of politics, Velasco is the CEO of Global Language Services, an organization that provides language interpretation services for government agencies, focus groups, and community events. She served as a public information officer during the Grizzly Creek Fire. Velasco previously worked in hotel management and food service, working for a time at the Ritz-Carlton Hotel in Aspen, Colorado, and the Belle Resort Hotel in Myanmar.

During her first year in office, she served as chair of the Wildfire Matters Committee of the Colorado House of Representatives.

In February 2026, Velasco co-sponsored the introduction of Modernizing Depopulation Act in the Colorado General Assembly. The Bill proposes to " prohibits an owner of poultry from using ventilation shutdown and ventilation shutdown plus, which methods kill poultry by gradually inducing fatal hyperthermia or heat stroke, as methods of depopulating their poultry."
