= Matthew Martinez (Colorado politician) =

American politician

Member of the Colorado House of Representatives from the 62nd district
- Incumbent
- Assumed office January 9, 2023
- Preceded by: Donald Valdez

Personal details
- Party: Democratic
- Education: Adams State University; Southern New Hampshire University

Matthew Martinez is an American politician who is a member of the Colorado House of Representatives from the 62nd district, which includes portions of Saguache, Costilla, Rio Grande, Conejos, Huerfano, Mineral, Pueblo and Alamosa counties. He was elected in 2022 and assumed office in January 2023.

== Background ==
Martinez is a seventh-generation native of Colorado. He was born and raised in Monte Vista. After graduating high school, Martinez joined the US Marine Corps and served in Iraq. After his service, Martinez attended and graduated from Adams State University with a bachelor's degree in political science. He later gained his master's degree from Southern New Hampshire University. He has served on the Monte Vista city council, local government boards, and various posts for the Adams State University. He also works for local organizations that focuses on public services.

== Political career ==
Martinez ran for office in 2020 against incumbent Donald Valdez. He lost in the primary to Valdez. In the 2022 general election, Martinez defeated the Republican candidate.

His legislative priorities include better access to healthcare, education, improving the local economy, protecting the resources of the area and other issues affecting the rural nature of the region.

=== Tenure ===
As of the 2023 legislative session, Martinez is a member of the Agriculture, Water and Natural Resources and Joint Select Committee on Rising Utility Rates committees. He alsos serves as vice-chair of the Education Committee.
