= Baldemar Velasquez =

American labor union activist (born 1947)

Baldemar Velásquez
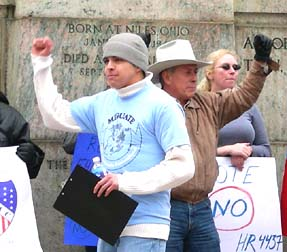
- Melvin Rios and Baldemar Velasquez at the Columbus, Ohio, Rally for Immigrants Rights on 2006-03-26.
- Born: February 15, 1947 (age 79); Pharr, Texas, U.S.
- Occupation: Labor leader
- Known for: President, Farm Labor Organizing Committee

Baldemar Velásquez (born February 15, 1947) is an American labor union activist. He co-founded and is president of the Farm Labor Organizing Committee, AFL-CIO. He was named a MacArthur Fellow (also known as the "Genius Grant") in 1989, and awarded the Order of the Aztec Eagle in 1994, the highest honor Mexico can bestow on a non-citizen.

== Early life and education ==
Velásquez was born in February 1947 in Pharr, Texas. He was the third of nine children born to Cresencio and Vicenta Castillo Velásquez. Baldemar's father was born into a Mexican-American family in Driscoll, Texas. His grandfather died when Cresencio was just 11 years old, forcing the young Cresencio to seek employment as a migrant worker. Baldemar's maternal grandparents fled to Pharr in 1910 after the Mexican Revolution, and his mother, Vicenta, was born there in 1920. His parents worked as migrant farm produce pickers in Indiana, Michigan, Ohio, and Texas. Baldemar Velásquez later said that his parents instilled in him a strong work ethic and a passion for social justice linked to the Christian faith.

Velásquez began assisting his parents in the fields when he was four years old. His family traveled from the Southwest to Midwest each year, following the harvest season for various crops. They rode with other migrant workers in a pickup truck with a canvas-covered bed, huddling around a can of hot ashes and covering themselves in blankets to stay warm. Often, the family would have only a single room for the parents and all their children. One winter, he and his siblings had gathered together for warmth while snow drifted into their one-room shack through gaps in the walls. The family's poverty worsened one year when an employer paid his father only half the wages he was owed. In 1954, his parents settled permanently in Gilboa, Ohio, where they worked in the fields in the summer and in a cannery during the winter. Baldemar knew almost no English when he entered the first grade, and struggled academically. He was a good athlete, playing several sports, but was often ridiculed for his Mexican American heritage. Velásquez led his first strike at the age of 12, helping pickers at his summer job win better wages. He began to excel in his studies in the eighth grade, making honor roll. He attended Pandora-Gilboa High School, where he participated in baseball, basketball, football, and track and field, and took college preparatory courses. His high school career guidance counselor advised him to only focus on industrial arts courses, but Velásquez refused.

A high school English teacher convinced him to go to college. He enrolled at Pan American University in Edinburg, Texas, in 1965, intending to major in engineering. Living in south Texas made him curious about his roots there, and he enrolled in a Texas history which, he said, opened his eyes to the exploitation of Mexican Americans and farmworkers. A local Roman Catholic priest assisted him in obtaining financial aid, and he transferred to Ohio Northern College (a private, United Methodist Church-affiliated school) in 1966. He transferred to Bluffton College (a private, Mennonite-affiliated school) a year later. He graduated with a Bachelor of Arts degree in sociology in 1969.

While at Bluffton College, he was mentored by Dr. Lawrence Templin, a noted pacifist who had been imprisoned for his beliefs and was now a professor of English literature. Templin had grown up in India as the son of Christian missionaries who knew Mahatma Gandhi personally. Templin's teachings deeply influence Velásquez's approach to securing social justice for farmworkers. Templin knew Bayard Rustin while in prison, and Templin encouraged him to volunteer with the Congress of Racial Equality (CORE)—a civil rights organization in which Rustin played a major role. Baldemar Velásquez spent several weeks in the summer of 1968 working with CORE and living with an African American family in Cleveland, Ohio. After graduation, he spent time picking cherries in Michigan to pay off his student loans, and went to Wisconsin to meet with the founder of Obreros Unidos, Jesus Salas (also known as "Jesse Salas").

His association with Templin changed his life in another way as well: Baldemar Velásquez married Templin's daughter, Sara Templin, on June 11, 1969. The couple had four children together.

== Career with FLOC ==
FLOC was founded in September 1967 by Baldemar Velásquez and his father. Velásquez had been deeply influenced by the ideas of Gandhi, César Chávez and Martin Luther King Jr. Initially, his goal was merely to organize the farmworkers so that they could cooperate with the growers to improve pay, housing, and education for the pickers. Sensing that the farmworkers would not take a 20-year-old student seriously, Velásquez relied on his father to gather the employees and get them to listen to him. He even sent volunteer organizers to Texas during the winter to talk to and organize the workers during their months away from work. But the effort largely failed, and in September 1968 Velásquez called a strike against 10 tomato growers in Ohio. Five growers signed contracts recognizing the union, agreeing to a minimum wage and limited health insurance, and promising not to discriminate against union members or union organizers. Within a few weeks, 21 other growers had agreed to contracts with FLOC as well. But in the following year, sustained anti-union opposition from the growers (backed by the American Farm Bureau Federation), the withdrawal of some growers from the tomato market, the refusal of some growers to honor their contracts, and the efforts of some growers to raise wages and improve working conditions caused Velásquez to rethink his organizing strategy.

In the 1970s, Velásquez began focusing on national and international companies in addition to local growers. "It was a big mistake to go after individual farmers," he said, "instead of focusing on the large corporations. We spent a lot of years doing that, and it was a mistake." From 1970 to 1983, Velasquez implemented a long-term strategy to build public support for the farmworkers, publicizing the discrimination, low wages, and often appalling working conditions they faced. In 1976, workers at a tomato cannery in Warren, Indiana, struck over the employer's tactic of overrecruiting workers in order to force down wages. The workers spontaneously barricaded themselves inside the cannery, refusing to allow the perishable crop inside until their grievances had been addressed. The workers asked FLOC to intervene. A federal district court issued an injunction requiring that the workers vacate the premises, but they refused. Although nearly all the workers were arrested, there was extensive publicity about the strike, the employer's overrecruitment tactic, the low wages and unsanitary conditions the workers suffered, and the use of the Immigration and Naturalization Service to intimidate workers and avoid paying them (through deportation proceedings). Velásquez later said the tomato cannery strike helped improve FLOC's negotiating and worker mobilization skills and provided a trial run for the union's dealings with large corporations.

Velásquez decided that the union's first target should be the Campbell's. The goal was three-way bargaining: The produce buyer (Campbell's) would pay slightly more for produce, which would allow growers to pay farmworkers much higher wages. Velásquez asked migrant workers in 1978 to strike growers with contracts with Campbell's, and 2,000 farm workers walked off the job. Velásquez required that all strikers be trained in nonviolent protest techniques, and he worked closely with local churches and religious groups so that large numbers of clergy and nuns were present (which inhibited violence). Campbell's denied any involvement in the strike (claiming the union's dispute was with the growers and not the soup company), and Velásquez announced a boycott in 1979. In August 1983, Velasquez led migrant workers on a 560-mile (900 km) protest march from the union headquarters in Toledo, Ohio, to Campbell's headquarters in Camden, New Jersey. Four months later, he took out advertisements in newspapers denouncing the conditions in the fields, and Campbell's responded with ads promoting its labor practices. Campbell's said the strike and boycott was having no effect on the company, and the United Food and Commercial Workers and AFL-CIO opposed FLOC's boycott out of concern that it would harm union members working for Campbell's. At the 1984 Democratic National Convention, Velásquez strategically positioned farmworkers in the audience with signs reading "Boycott Campbell's." Cameras focused on the signs during a prime time speech by Democratic presidential candidate Rev. Jesse Jackson, which raised the profile of the boycott. Velásquez also encouraged stockholders to sell their company shares, and for schools and parents to not participate in the company's program which donated money to local schools in exchange for product purchases. On the advice of Ray Rogers, a comprehensive campaign expert, Velásquez agreed to raise the financial pressure on Campbell. A shareholder resolution to recognize FLOC was introduced at the 1984 company stockholder meeting, but it was easily defeated (27.3 million shares to 263,906 shares). Velásquez and about 200 FLOC members picketed the shareholder meeting, which was held under heavy security. Velásquez also put pressure on directors of Prudential Insurance Company, Equitable Life Assurance Society, and Philadelphia National Bank, many of whom also were directors of Campbell's, to resign from the Cambell's board or face a stockholder campaign as well. After two years of the widened financial campaign, Campbell agreed to the nation's first three-way collective bargaining agreement on February 23, 1986. It covered 600 workers at 16 tomato growers in Ohio and 12 cucumber growers in Michigan, an additional 71 growers agreed to hold union organizing elections in the summer of 1986.

Velásquez soon signed agreements with Aunt Jane Foods, Dean Foods, Green Bay Foods, H. J. Heinz Company, and Vlasic Pickles. A few years later, the growers began complaining that they could not compete with inexpensive Mexican produce. Velásquez personally traveled to Mexico, successfully lobbied the Mexican unions to raise their wages and benefits, and closed the price differential.

FLOC also began organizing cucumber pickers and pickle processing workers in North Carolina in the early 1990s. Velásquez decided to target the Mount Olive Pickle Company, the major pickle processor in the state. Once more, Velásquez decided on a boycott when initial attempts to secure a three-way collective bargaining contract failed. Velásquez personally led a four-day, 70-mile (110 km) march from Mount Olive, North Carolina, to Raleigh. On September 16, 2004, FLOC signed a collective bargaining agreement with Mount Olive and the growers which covered more than 8,500 of the state's 10,000 guest workers. It was the first union contract for farmworkers in the state, and the first to establish a union hiring hall in Mexico to supply the state with guest workers.

In 2010, Velásquez led FLOC in joining with the United Auto Workers in announcing a boycott of JPMorgan Chase to protest the banking concern's efforts to begin extensive foreclosure proceedings against homeowners nationwide. The same year, he was one of only 15 individuals appointed to a committee of the International Labour Organization to create global working condition standards for farmworkers.

== Other service ==
In 1990, Velásquez obtained a degree in practical theology from Florida International Seminary. He was later ordained a chaplain by Florida-based Rapha Ministries.

Velásquez has served on the board of directors of a number of different organizations. He helped organize the National People of Color Environmental Leadership Summit in 1991, and in 2006 served on the board of directors of Agricultural Missions, a nonprofit corporate arm of the National Council of Churches. As of 2010 serves on the board of Policy Matters Ohio, the University of Toledo, and the Toledo Zoo. In November 2010, Ohio Governor Ted Strickland appointed him to the Commission on Hispanic/Latino Affairs, a state panel which analyzes the problems of and provides information about programs affecting Spanish-speaking people in that state.

== Honors ==
Velásquez has received numerous honors. He received an inaugural Bannerman Fellowships in 1988 for helping organize people for racial, social, economic, and environmental justice. He was named a MacArthur Fellow (the so-called "Genius Grant") the following year by the John D. and Catherine T. MacArthur Foundation. In 1994, the National Council of La Raza bestowed on him the Hispanic Heritage Leadership Award. That same year he also received Mexico's Aguila Azteca Award—the highest award Mexico can give a non-citizen.

Velásquez has also received honorary Doctor of Humane Letters degrees from Bowling Green State University in 1996, Bluffton College in 1998, and the University of Toledo in 1998.

== Bibliography ==
- Abrams, Alan. "Baldemar Velásquez Represents U.S.-American Farmworkers in Historic Global Labor Code Negotiations in Geneva This Week." La Prensa. October 29, 2010.
- Agricultural Missions. 2007 Annual Report. New York: Agricultural Missions, 2007.
- Barger, Walter Kenneth and Mendoza Reza, Ernesto. The Farm Labor Movement in the Midwest: Social Change and Adaptation Among Migrant Farmworkers. Austin, Tex.: University of Texas Press, 1993.
- "Board Votes to Work With Union." University of Toledo Independent Collegian. August 30, 2010.
- Condit, Cyndi. "Toledo Zoo Welcomed Three New Members to Its Board." Zoo and Aquarium Visitor News. June 23, 2010.
- D'Emilio, John. The Life and Times of Bayard Rustin. Chicago: University of Chicago Press, 2003.
- "Farm Group Boycotting Campbell Puts Focus on Financial Concerns." Associated Press. November 27, 1984.
- "Farm Labor Organizing Committee." In Encyclopedia of U.S. Labor and Working-class History. Eric Arnesen, ed. New York: CRC Press, 2007.
- Franklin, Stephen. "Farm Workers' Group Pushes for Better Pay, Rights." Chicago Tribune. April 8, 2006.
- García, John A.; Córdova, Teresa; and García, Juan R. The Chicano Struggle: Analyses of Past and Present Efforts. Binghamton, N.Y.: Bilingual Press, 1984.
- Greenhouse, Steven. "North Carolina Growers' Group Signs Union Contract for Mexican Workers." New York Times. September 17, 2004.
- Hintz, Joy. Valiant Migrant Women = Las Mujeres Valerosas. Tiffin, Ohio: Aid and Friendship, 1982.
- Hispanic Americans Information Directory. Detroit, Mich.: Gale Research, 1991.
- Howell, Leon. "Boycotting Pickles – Protesting Treatment of Migrant Workers." Christian Century. January 3, 2001.
- McDonnell, Patrick J. "Mexican Official Denounces Ballot Measure." Los Angeles Times. August 15, 1994.
- O'Neill, Patrick. "Union Leader Brings Organizing Campaign to Cucumber Pickers." National Catholic Reporter. July 4, 1997.
- O'Neill, Patrick. "Where Union Has Gone Before." Sojourners. September–October 1998.
- Ragosta, Patrick. "Boycott Aims at Campbell." New York Times. September 9, 1984.
- Rosenbaum, Rene Perez. Success in Organizing, Failure in Collective Bargaining: The Case of Tomato Workers in Northwest Ohio, 1967-69. East Lansing, Mich.: Michigan State University, 1991.
- Schneider, Keith. "Campbell Soup Accord Ends a Decade of Strife." New York Times. February 24, 1986.
- Sengupta, Somini. "Farm Union Takes Aim At a Big Pickle Maker." New York Times. October 26, 2000.
- Serrin, William. "Migrant Workers Organize a Boycott of Campbell." New York Times. July 2, 1984.
- Smith-Nonini, Sandy. "Inventing a Public Anthropology With Latino Farm Labor Organizers in North Carolina." In Invisible Anthropologists: Engaged Anthropology in Immigrant Communities. Alayne Unterberger, ed. Malden, Mass.: Wiley Periodicals, 2009.
- Templin, Lawrence. "How the War Changed My Life." In A Few Small Candles: War Resisters of World War II Tell Their Stories. Larry Gara and Lenna Mae Gara, eds. Kent, Ohio: Kent State University Press, 1999.
- "3 From Northwest Ohio Are Lame-Duck Appointees." Toledo Blade. November 24, 2010.
- "UAW Launches Protest of Chase Over Foreclosures." Detroit News. September 25, 2010.
- Valdés, Dennis Nodín. Al Norte: Agricultural Workers in the Great Lakes Region, 1917-1970. Austin, Tex.: University of Texas Press, 1991.
- "Velásquez, Baldemar." In Making It in America: A Sourcebook on Eminent Ethnic Americans. Elliott Robert Barkan, ed. Santa Barbara, Calif.: ABC-CLIO, 2001.
- "Velásquez, Baldemar." In The Mexican American Experience: An Encyclopedia. Matt S. Meier and Margo Gutiérrez, eds. Westport, Conn.: Greenwood, 2003.
- Velásquez, Baldemar. "Baldemar Velásquez." In Shafted: Free Trade and America's Working Poor. Christine Ahn, ed. Oakland, Calif.: Food First Books, 2003.

Trade union offices
Preceded by Founding President	President, Farm Labor Organizing Committee; 1967 - Present	Succeeded by Incumbent
