= Cecelia Espenoza =

American politician

Member of the Colorado House of Representatives from District 4
- Incumbent
- Assumed office January 8, 2025
- Preceded by: Tim Hernández

Personal details
- Party: Democratic
- Education: University of Utah

Cecelia Espenoza is an American politician and retired judge. She was elected as a member of the Colorado House of Representatives in the 2024 election for the 4th district. She is a member of the Democratic Party.

== Early life, education, and political career ==
Espenoza was born to farmworkers and is of Mexican American descent. Denverite reported that Espenoza was the first Latina to graduate from the honors program at the University of Utah. In 1982, she became the second Latina to be admitted to the Utah State Bar.

In the 1990s, she became a law professor at the University of Denver. During her career, she served as an appellate immigration judge, and worked in the U.S. Department of Justice as a Senior Associate General Counsel, for the Executive Office of Immigration Review where she served as the Privacy Officer, Freedom of Information Counsel and Records Officer.

== Political career ==
In June 2024, she won the Democratic primary for the 4th district of the Colorado House of Representatives, defeating incumbent Representative Tim Hernández. Espenoza had previously contested the same position in a 2023 vacancy appointment to replace Serena Gonzales-Gutierrez but had been defeated by Hernández. She serves on the House Judiciary and State, Veteran and Military Affairs Committees. Espenoza is also appointed as a Commissioner of the Uniform Laws Commission.
