= Jesús Salas =

Jesus Salas (born 1943) is an American labor unionist and political activist.

Jesús Salas may also refer to:

- Jesús Salas Barraza (1879–1951), Mexican politician and revolutionary, participant in the assassination of Pancho Villa
- Jesús Salas Tornés, Mexican restauranteur, co-founder of Expendio de Maíz in Mexico City
