= Tim Hernández =

American politician and activist (born 1997)

Member of the Colorado House of Representatives from the 4th district
- In office September 12, 2023 – January 8, 2025
- Preceded by: Serena Gonzales-Gutierrez
- Succeeded by: Cecelia Espenoza

Personal details
- Born: Timothy Mariano Hernández; February 25, 1997 (age 29) Pueblo, Colorado, U.S.
- Party: Democratic
- Other political affiliations: Democratic Socialists of America (Note: Democratic Socialists of America is not a registered political party, instead, it is a political organization for those with democratic socialist ideologies.)
- Education: University of Northern Colorado

Timothy Mariano Hernández (born February 25, 1997) is an American politician, activist, and schoolteacher. He served as the representative for the 4th district in the Colorado House of Representatives from September 2023 to January 2025. Hernández was appointed to the chamber in August 2023 by a vacancy committee and is the first member of Generation Z to hold a state office in Colorado.

A member of the Democratic Party, Hernández advocates a progressive platform including support for gun control and affordable housing.

== Personal life ==
Hernández was born on February 25, 1997, in Pueblo, Colorado, into a Chicano family, and grew up in North Side, Denver.

He went to the University of Northern Colorado and served as the president of the student body between 2015 and until his graduation in 2019.

== Teaching career ==
Before becoming a member of the Colorado House of Representatives, Hernández was a teacher at Aurora West College Preparatory Academy in Aurora, Colorado, and earlier worked at North High School. He is a member of the Colorado Education Association, and was previously a board member of the Denver Classroom Teachers Association.

=== North High School and protests ===
"The district can say whatever placating, semantic bullshit they want about my position being temporary. But every associate teacher at North who wanted to stay at the school has been able to, and nothing proves why I haven't been given the same opportunity. I've scored above effective as a teacher. My student-perception surveys are 5 to 10 percent higher than the school average. I have a signed letter of endorsement from my department. But I was still let go."

— Tim Hernández, Westword

Hernández began working at North High School in Denver teaching Mexican American literature and English in January 2021. According to Hernández, towards the end of the ongoing academic year, the school did not have enough money to keep him as a teacher, but offered him an associate teaching position for the 2021–2022 academic year under a one-year contract, which he accepted.

In December 2021, a group of students at North High School, led by Hernández, wrote a photography and poetry book, titled Our Sacred Community. The book describes the lifestyle of Latinx students growing up in the gentrifying North Side, Denver. Along with being free to read online, students were selling physical copies of the book for $10 to fundraise for a student leadership conference they were planning on hosting.

In May 2022, after Hernández conducted an interview with North High School, he was told by the school in a meeting that he did not interview well enough, and so his contract with the school would not be renewed. He claimed that he was let go for "retaliatory reasons" and that he "openly [challenged his] principal on issues of equity and anti-racism." This decision sparked outrage amongst students, as he was one of the only teachers of color at North High School. Approximately 50 students marched to the Denver Public Schools downtown headquarters, demanding that the school rehire Hernández. On May 13, Hernández was placed on administrative leave after attending a student walkout in support of him; this would be lifted on June 13.

=== Aurora West College Preparatory Academy ===
Shortly after being put on paid administrative leave at North High School, Hernández obtained a teaching position at Aurora West College Preparatory Academy in Aurora, Colorado. He was an 11th- and 12th-grade ethnic and Chicano studies teacher. While working there, his class studied movements such as Palestinian nationalism, works of the Black Panther Party, and the Stonewall riots.

In December 2022, after a shooting occurred at Club Q, a gay bar in Colorado Springs, Colorado, his final assignment was to write letters to victims of the shooting, after his students suggested the idea. Hernández's class was learning about queer studies the week the shooting took place.

== Political career ==
Before running for election, Hernández worked for Elisabeth Epps during her campaign for the Colorado House of Representatives.

In August 2023, Hernández announced he was running for the Colorado House of Representatives under the 4th district. The seat was previously held by Serena Gonzales-Gutierrez, who resigned to serve as a member of the Denver City Council.

Hernández ran against former appellate immigration judge Cecelia Espenoza and former state representative Rochelle Galindo. On August 26, 2023, Hernández was selected by the vacancy committee of the Colorado Democratic Party to replace Gonzales-Gutierrez. In the final election, he received 39 votes; Espenoza received 27 and Galindo received just 2. He was sworn in on September 12, 2023.

In February 2024, Hernández and senator Julie Gonzales proposed a bill that would create a special license plate representing the Chicano community in Colorado. The bill was introduced on February 29 and passed the House Finance Committee on a 9–2 vote. In April, it passed the house on a 41–18 vote and the Senate 26–9.

A bill co-sponsored by Hernández and Epps, which would put a ban on the sale and transfer of semi-automatic firearms, was passed by the House in April 2024. All of those who voted in support were Democrats. The bill was met with opposition from Republicans, who argued that it was unconstitutional and would decrease safety in Colorado. It was sent to the Senate for further approval, but was postponed indefinitely by Julie Gonzales, stating that she would like to discuss the bill "outside the pressure cooker of the Capitol during the last weeks of the legislative session."

Hernández ran for election in 2024, facing a primary challenge from Espenoza. Espenoza defeated Hernández in the primary. The Associated Press called the race at 10:17 p.m. with Espenoza securing 55% of the vote compared to Hernández's 45%. (Note: Ballot returns the day after showed Espenoza leading Hernández by 6%. Certified results on July 23 also showed Espenoza leading Hernández by 6%.) He conceded the following day, stating that "these aren't the results we wanted today, but I'm not going anywhere." Hernández was officially replaced by Espenoza on January 8, 2025.

== Political positions ==
Hernández is a progressive Democrat and has advocated in support for gun control, affordable housing, stronger funding for public schools, and student rights. Alongside the Democratic Party, he is a member of the Democratic Socialists of America. Hernández has been a vocal supporter of the State of Palestine during the Gaza war and has called for a ceasefire, saying that he is "not willing to let [his] community feel comfortable supporting a genocide."

On the day of the 2023 Hamas attack on Israel, Hernández was criticized after he and around three dozen other participants attended a rally in support of Palestine that took place at the Colorado State Capitol. In a video uploaded to X, Hernández was asked if he condemns "the murder of women and children in the streets by Palestinian terrorists," which he refused to do asking, "what about it?" When the person filming said that he found the reason for the rally to be despicable, Hernández dismissed him, saying: "congratulations."

Fellow state legislators Dafna Michaelson Jenet and Ron Weinberg condemned Hernández's actions and Governor Jared Polis released a statement saying "the only proper response is to condemn Hamas for these evil terrorist attacks on innocent civilians and stand with Israel." Speaker of the House Julie McCluskie and Majority Leader Monica Duran also released a statement saying they are "deeply disappointed that when there was doubt, [Hernández] chose not to explicitly condemn the violent Hamas terrorist attacks," calling them an "atrocity that demands unequivocal condemnation."

In a written letter posted to X, Hernández defended his actions, claiming he did not attend the rally in support of Hamas, but rather to give solidarity to Palestinians. Several days later, he posted a video on X, where he formally condemned Hamas.

== Electoral history ==
2023 Colorado's 4th House of Representatives district vacancy committee selection
Party	Candidate	Votes	%
Democratic	Tim Hernández	39	57.35%
Democratic	Cecelia Espenoza	27	39.71%
Democratic	Rochelle Galindo	2	2.94%
Total votes		68	100.00%

2024 Colorado's 4th House of Representatives district Democratic primary
Party	Candidate	Votes	%
Democratic	Cecelia Espenoza	5,589	53.18%
Democratic	Tim Hernández	4,920	46.82%
Total votes		10,509	100.00%
