= Kahlil Seren =

American politician

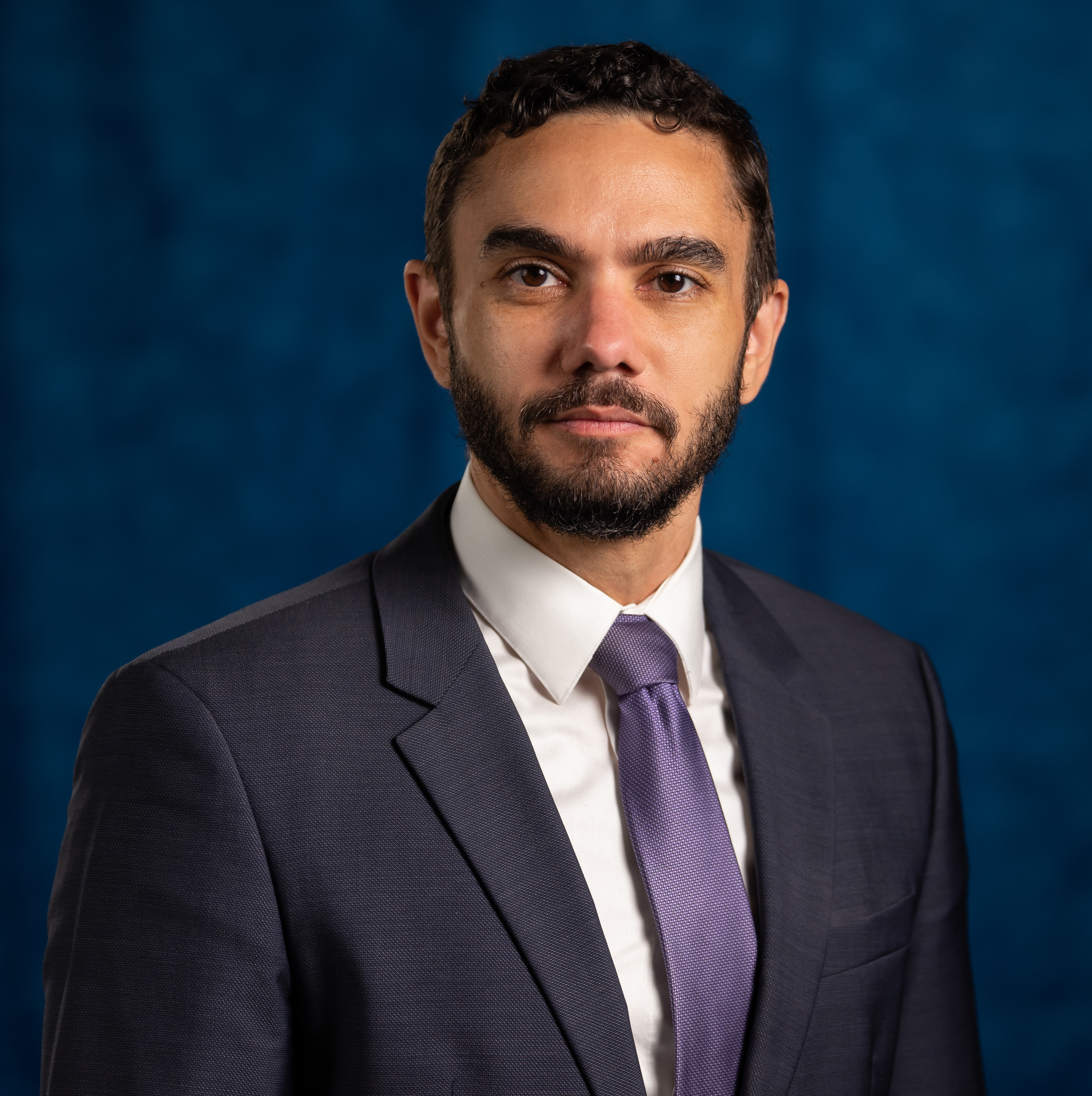

Mayor of Cleveland Heights, Ohio
- In office January 1, 2022 – October 1, 2025
- Preceded by: Position established
- Succeeded by: Tony Cuda (interim)

Personal details
- Born: Cleveland, Ohio
- Party: Democratic
- Education: Cleveland State University (BA); Maxine Goodman Levin College of Urban Affairs (MS)

Kahlil Seren is an American politician, former local-government adviser, and the first directly elected Mayor of Cleveland Heights, Ohio. He became the first Cleveland Heights mayor to be removed from office in a recall election, with about 82% of voters backing removal on September 9, 2025.

Before becoming mayor, Seren was a policy adviser to Cuyahoga County Council and served on the Cleveland Heights City Council. During his mayoral term, Seren was the subject of multiple controversies.

== Early life and education ==
Seren was born in Cleveland Heights, Ohio and spent his childhood in East Cleveland, Ohio. He graduated from Beachwood High School in 1997.

Seren studied at Eastern Michigan University before transferring to Cleveland State University, where he earned a Bachelor of Arts degree in Psychology and Political Science. Seren earned a Master of Science degree in Urban Studies from Cleveland State University's Maxine Goodman Levin College of Urban Affairs.

== Career ==
In 2007, Seren worked as a communications coordinator for Policy Matters Ohio, a non-profit policy research institute. In 2011, Seren entered public service as a Policy Advisor to the newly established Cuyahoga County Council, the legislative authority of the county government, after a public corruption scandal in Cuyahoga County government and subsequent restructuring of County Government. Until 2022, Seren primarily advised on matters related to economic development, community development, workforce development, and education, serving as a Policy Advisor to County Council.

== Cleveland Heights City Council ==
Seren entered elective office in February 2015, appointed to an unexpired term on Cleveland Heights City Council, filling a vacancy when former Council member Janine Boyd won a seat in the Ohio House of Representatives. Seren ran to keep the seat in November 2015, winning his first four-year term. In November 2019, Seren successfully sought reelection to Cleveland Heights City Council, winning a second term beginning January 2020, at which time the Council selected him to be Vice Mayor and Vice President of Council.

== Mayor of Cleveland Heights ==
=== Election ===
On January 25, 2021, Seren announced his candidacy in the City of Cleveland Heights' first mayoral election, which was to be held later that year.

In the September 14, 2021, primary election, Seren placed second out of three candidates, receiving 2,587 votes (37.62%) behind Barbara Danforth, who led with 3,158 votes (45.92%). Danforth and Seren both advanced to the general election.

On November 2, 2021, Seren won the general election for Mayor of Cleveland Heights with 6,899 votes (60.51%) to Danforth's 4,502 votes (39.49%).

=== Tenure ===
==== 2022 ====
Seren took office as Cleveland Heights' first directly elected strong mayor on January 1, 2022.

==== 2024 ====
In June 2024, multiple formal complaints were filed against Cain Park General Manager Ian Hinz, alleging a pattern of verbal abuse, intimidation, and retaliatory behavior toward staff. A city-commissioned investigation found that Hinz had violated city policies by creating a hostile work environment, including yelling at employees, pounding his fists during meetings, and removing office doors. The final report concluded that Hinz's behavior posed a risk of "morale issues, disruption, and potential liability if unaddressed". City staff recommended a suspension, anger management training, performance improvement plan, and demotion or reassignment to another role. In March 2025, Seren approved some of the disciplinary actions but declined to demote or reassign Hinz.

On December 6, 2024, Seren's wife, Natalie McDaniel, allegedly pounded on a glass partition and shouted profanities at staff in the mayor's wing, according to police documentation and internal accounts. The city has declined to release body camera footage from an officer present during the incident. The event was not addressed publicly at the time; the event was later referenced in internal complaints and contributed to allegations of a hostile work environment involving McDaniel.

Later that month, City Council passed a temporary three-month budget for the first quarter of 2025—an unprecedented move in Cleveland Heights. Councilmembers cited the absence of a permanent finance director, missing salary and labor cost data, and a lack of key documentation in the administration's proposed budget.

==== 2025 ====
In March 2025, City Administrator Dan Horrigan resigned after less than three months in office. In emails and interviews, Horrigan cited the conduct of Seren's wife, Natalie McDaniel, as contributing to an "untenable, improper, and unethical" work environment. Horrigan's resignation followed a March 13 incident involving McDaniel and Andrea Heim, the city's human resources organizational performance manager. In emails to human resources and Seren, Heim alleged that McDaniel had repeatedly disrupted the workplace with profane outbursts and created an unsafe environment. Seren placed Heim on leave and Heim resigned soon after.

Shortly after these resignations, Seren gave a public interview defending McDaniel's presence in City Hall. He described her role as similar to that of a political spouse, calling her Cleveland Heights' "first lady". He denied she held any formal duties but acknowledged her presence in meetings and decision-making discussions.

On March 18, 2025, City Council passed a full-year operating budget totaling $59.4 million in revenue and $58.2 million in expenditures. The revised budget included additional funding for capital projects, public safety, and programs not originally proposed by the mayor. Councilmembers commended the oversight process, while the mayor called for improved collaboration.

In April 2025, City Council began formally evaluating the workplace climate by interviewing human resources consultants. Council President Tony Cuda and others raised questions about whether McDaniel had an office, directed staff, or accessed public systems using shared credentials. Legislation was introduced to limit keycard access to city buildings to official employees and vetted contractors. Also in April, media reporting highlighted that at least a dozen senior staff had departed during Seren's tenure, including three city administrators, multiple finance and recreation directors, and other department heads.

At a council meeting in April, councilmembers questioned whether a $48,000 contract with political consulting firm Burges & Burges had been to conduct resident satisfaction surveys rather than consulting services, which Seren denied.

In May 2025, an EEOC complaint was filed by a former employee - Seren's former assistant - documenting accusations of antisemitic comments from Seren's wife to other city employees about Jewish city employees, appointees, and constituents. The complaint became public in the Plain Dealer. An investigation by law firm Mansour Gavin paid for by the city was released in June 2025. It found that McDaniel did not create an unlawful hostile work environment at City Hall. It also said that Seren and McDaniel created a "very uncomfortable work environment" and that "employees could feel intimidated by the mayor’s wife’s continual presence".

Cleveland.com reported that the Seren administration had contacted the Cuyahoga County Prosecutor's Office to ask whether a Cleveland Heights police officer could be charged with a felony for recording the December 6, 2024 incident involving McDaniel and an on-duty police officer inside City Hall. The controversies around the administration's request and the allegations of a hostile work environment contributed to calls from residents and the editorial board of The Plain Dealer for Seren to resign.

In June 2025, City Council passed a "no-confidence" resolution and the Cuyahoga County Board of Elections ruled that Seren had failed to submit the required number of valid petition signatures, disqualifying him from the 2025 mayoral ballot. Seren had filed 492 signatures but the Cuyahoga County Board of Elections ruled on June 16, 2025 that only 303 were valid—short of the 342 required—thereby removing his name from the September primary.

==== 2025 recall effort ====
A recall effort gathered a total of 3,845 verified signatures from registered voters in Cleveland Heights and the Cuyahoga County Board of Elections validated the recall petition on June 25th and put in on the September 9th ballot.

On July 22nd, 2025 Seren attempted to veto his own recall, which the city law director found untimely and unlawful.

On September 9, 2025, voters in Cleveland Heights voted to recall Seren.

On September 30, 2025, in the final days of his tenure, Seren fired Law Director William Hanna and named Deputy Law Director Christopher Heltzel acting law director.

Seren was officially removed from office on October 1, 2025, following certification of the recall results; Council President Tony Cuda was sworn in as interim mayor that day.
