= Jerry Frangas =

American lawyer and politician from Colorado

Member of the Colorado House of Representatives from the 4th district
- In office January 8, 2003 – 2011
- Succeeded by: Dan Pabon

Personal details
- Born: October 24, 1966 (age 59) Denver, Colorado
- Party: Democratic
- Profession: Social worker

K. Jerry Frangas (born October 24, 1966) is and American politician who was a legislator from the U.S. state of Colorado. Elected to the Colorado House of Representatives as a Democrat in 2002, Frangas represented House District 4, which encompasses northwest Denver, Colorado.

== Early career ==
Jerry Frangas was born in Denver, Colorado,. He graduated from Golden High School in Golden, Colorado where he participated in football, debate and swimming. Frangas earned a bachelor's degree in Political Science and then completed a Master of Public Administration at the Maxine Goodman Levin College of Urban Affairs at Cleveland State University. At Cleveland State, he served as student body president and was a scholarship athlete and team captain for the fencing team. He was also appointed to serve on the Cleveland State Board of Trustees by Ohio Governor George Voinovich. After returning to Denver, he worked as a Clinical Coordinator for the Central Shelter for Homeless Working Men in Denver and then worked as a caseworker for Douglas County Human services. At the same time, he earned a Bachelor's in Social Work from Metropolitan State College of Denver in 1998 and a Master's of Social Work from the University of Denver in 2000. Since 2000, Frangas has worked as a Senior Caseworker for the Denver Human Services and has been an adjunct instructor in Social Work at Metro State.

Frangas and his wife, Gregoria, have been married over 20 years and they have three children. Within the Denver community, Frangas was active with several neighborhood organizations.

== Legislative career ==
Frangas was first elected to the Colorado House of Representatives in 2002 and has been re-elected three times since then, each time defeating a Republican opponent by more than a 3:1 margin.

=== 2003 Legislative Session ===
In the 2003 Legislative Session, Frangas served on the Health and Human Services Committee and State Veteran's and Military Affairs Committee. Frangas successfully carried and passed legislation regarding securing a permanent funding stream for the Colorado State Veteran's Cemetery, for the enforcement of restitution for auto theft and vandalism, and several pieces of legislation related to the safety and welfare of children.

=== 2004 Legislative Session ===
Notable accomplishments by Frangas during this session included protections of private information from identity theft, requirements for the tarping of vehicles hauling trash on the highway, evaluation of The Colorado Works Program, and the reform and update of the regulation of mental health professionals.

=== 2007 Legislative Session ===
In the 2007 session of the Colorado General Assembly, Frangas sat on the House Finance Committee and was the Vice-Chairman of the House Health and Human Services Committee.

In 2007, Frangas, after failing to find a cab in downtown Denver on New Year's Eve, sponsored a bill to allow for greater competition between taxicab companies. Attempted deregulation had failed numerous times before, and Frangas was only able to reform regulation regarding the lease rate cabbies pay from the cab companies.

Frangas was also one of only a few Democrats to oppose a plan by Governor Bill Ritter to freeze property tax rates which would have increased state revenue through property taxes;. Under the final version of this legislation, "...few local districts would see additional money from the freeze. Instead, all of the money raised will go to the districts and will replace, rather than supplement, a similar amount that the state had provided each district..." (Ed Sealover, Colorado Springs Gazette).

Frangas proposed that Denver Public Schools, and other districts where taxpayers contributed a substantial amount and had great need, would receive additional funds from the state via the property tax freeze as opposed to putting it into backfilling the State Budget. Frangas failed in this effort, but drew media and public attention to the problems with education funding in Colorado.

=== 2008 Legislative Session ===
In the 2008 Legislative Session of the Colorado General Assembly, Frangas sits on the House Finance Committee and is vice-chairman of the House Health and Human Services Committee.

=== 2008 Election ===
Frangas won re-election in November 2008 to a fourth term in the legislature with 18,163 votes over Republican Rick Nevin who won 4,257 votes.

=== 2009 Legislative Session ===
In the 2009 session of the Colorado General Assembly, Frangas sat on the House Transportation and Energy Committee and was vice-chairman of the House Finance Committee.

=== 2010 Legislative Session ===
In the 2010 session of the Colorado General Assembly, Frangas sat on the House Finance Committee and was Vice-Chairman of the House Transportation and Energy Committee. In this session, Frangas carried and passed numerous pieces of legislation including a bill for better enforcement of handicap parking laws, a requirement for insurance coverage for reproductive health and maternity care for women, a bill to include pets in protective orders related to domestic violence, legislation to prevent financial exploitation of seniors and the disabled, and bills to improve access to mental health care, as well as to push for the development of behavioral health crisis response services. He also passed a resolution calling on the Federal Government to not charge interest on unemployment insurance loans to the States. Legislation that he was not successful in passing included efforts to enhance penalties for discrimination against the disabled as well as efforts to allow for the pooling of health insurance for small businesses and local governments.
