= Dan Pabon =

American lawyer and politician from Colorado

Member of the Colorado House of Representatives from the 4th district
- In office January 12, 2011 – January 4, 2019
- Preceded by: Jerry Frangas
- Succeeded by: Serena Gonzales-Gutierrez

Personal details
- Born: Daniel Robert Pabon; October 18, 1977 (age 49)
- Party: Democratic
- Education: University of Colorado Boulder (BSME, JD)
- Website: http://danpabon.nationbuilder.com

Daniel Robert Pabon (born October 18, 1977) is an American politician and lawyer from Colorado. He is a former member of the Colorado House of Representatives, having served from 2011-2019.

== Biography ==
Pabon grew up in the same community he is now serving in the Colorado House of Representatives. Pabon attended Holy Family and then studied engineering at the University of Colorado at Boulder, where he was elected Co-Student Body President his senior year. As a law student at CU Boulder, he worked for the Legal Aid and Defenders Program. He helped the poor and disabled obtain Social Security benefits, navigated them through family law, and acted as general counselor and advocate for those most vulnerable. Also during law school, Dan served as Class President.

After earning his JD, Pabon worked at a prestigious Denver-based law firm, where he built a practice focused on real estate and green building development. He became a member of the U.S. Green Building Council and was a strong advocate for green technologies and investing in Colorado's new energy economy. Pabon later gave up his career as a lawyer to become Northwest Denver's neighborhood attorney. His clients included neighborhood small business owners, residents, and non-profit organizations.

Pabon worked on higher education issues as the vice-chair of the Auraria Higher Education Center Board; was a voice for senior citizens as a member of the Association for Senior Citizens Board; served as the Captain of the House District 4 Democrats; and worked for two months on the Obama-Biden Presidential transition team, where he helped draft the President's first executive order on transparency and ethics in government.

== Legislative career ==
=== 2010 campaign ===
The campaign kicked off in Pabon's backyard with over 150 attendees. The election and during the ensuing months, thousands of doors were knocked and phones calls were made. The effort paid off—in the general election, Dan won over seventy-five percent of the vote.

Pabon's priorities include a healthy economy and job creation; affordable health care; transparent and accountable government; stronger protections for seniors; improved education; protection for women's reproductive rights; and full legal recognition of same-sex marriage.

=== 2011 legislative session ===
Representative Pabon was prime sponsor on five pieces of legislation and co-prime sponsor on several more.

=== 2012 election ===
In the 2012 General Election, Representative Pabon faced Republican challenger David W. Dobson. Pabon was elected by a wide margin of 81% to 19%.

== Legal issues ==
Pabon was arrested for drunk driving on March 17, 2016 — St. Patrick's Day — in downtown Denver. During the course of the arrest, Pabon attempted to use his influence as an elected official to get out of the situation. He asked the Denver Police officer who pulled him over to call the city attorney or a police supervisor, but the officer refused.

In July 2016, Pabon pleaded guilty and received a light sentence. His sentence included a year of probation, attendance at a victim-impact panel, alcohol education/treatment, monitoring of sobriety, and a small fine.
