= Antonio Orendain =

Agriculture Man

Antonio Orendain (May 28, 1930 – April 12, 2016) was a Mexican immigrant to the United States where he worked as an agricultural worker and Union activist. He is known for his work as a part of the Community Service Organization (CSO) from 1953 to 1962, as well as his work alongside Cesar Chavez as a part of the National Farm Workers Association (NFWA). Orendain later went on to found the Texas Farm Workers Union (TFWU) to specifically organize agricultural workers in Texas.

== Early life ==
Antonio Orendain was born in Etzatlán, Mexico. His father was a guard, commonly known as a watcher, in the agricultural fields of his community and was killed when Orendain was 3 years old. Orendain then lived with his grandparents and worked alongside his grandfather who was also a watcher. He came to the United States without documentation through California in 1950 when he was 20 years old to work as a farm laborer. He met his wife, Raquel, while working for the Community Service Organization (CSO) and they married in 1952. He was naturalized in 1959.

== Union work ==
Antonio Orendain worked with several unions throughout his career in hopes of bringing more rights and recognition to the problems facing farm workers in California and especially Texas.

=== Community Service Organization (CSO) ===
The Community Service Organization was started by Edward Roybal and Fred Ross in 1947 to fight against unequal housing and employment, as well as discrimination in education. Antonio Orendain was a part of the Community Service Organization (CSO) from 1953 to 1962 where he met and worked with Cesar Chavez. Orendain joined the Community Service Organization (CSO) as a part of the anti-bracero movement. The Bracero Program was implemented by the U.S. government after WWII in order to have cheap labor in southwestern agriculture. Orendain and Chavez argued that the agricultural businesses were hiring the cheap labor of Mexican Braceros which aggravated poverty among laborers and pressured growers to hire local workers. The Community Service Organization (CSO) shifted its main focus to helping California Farmers, but they were met with strong opposition.

=== National Farm Workers Association (NFWA) ===
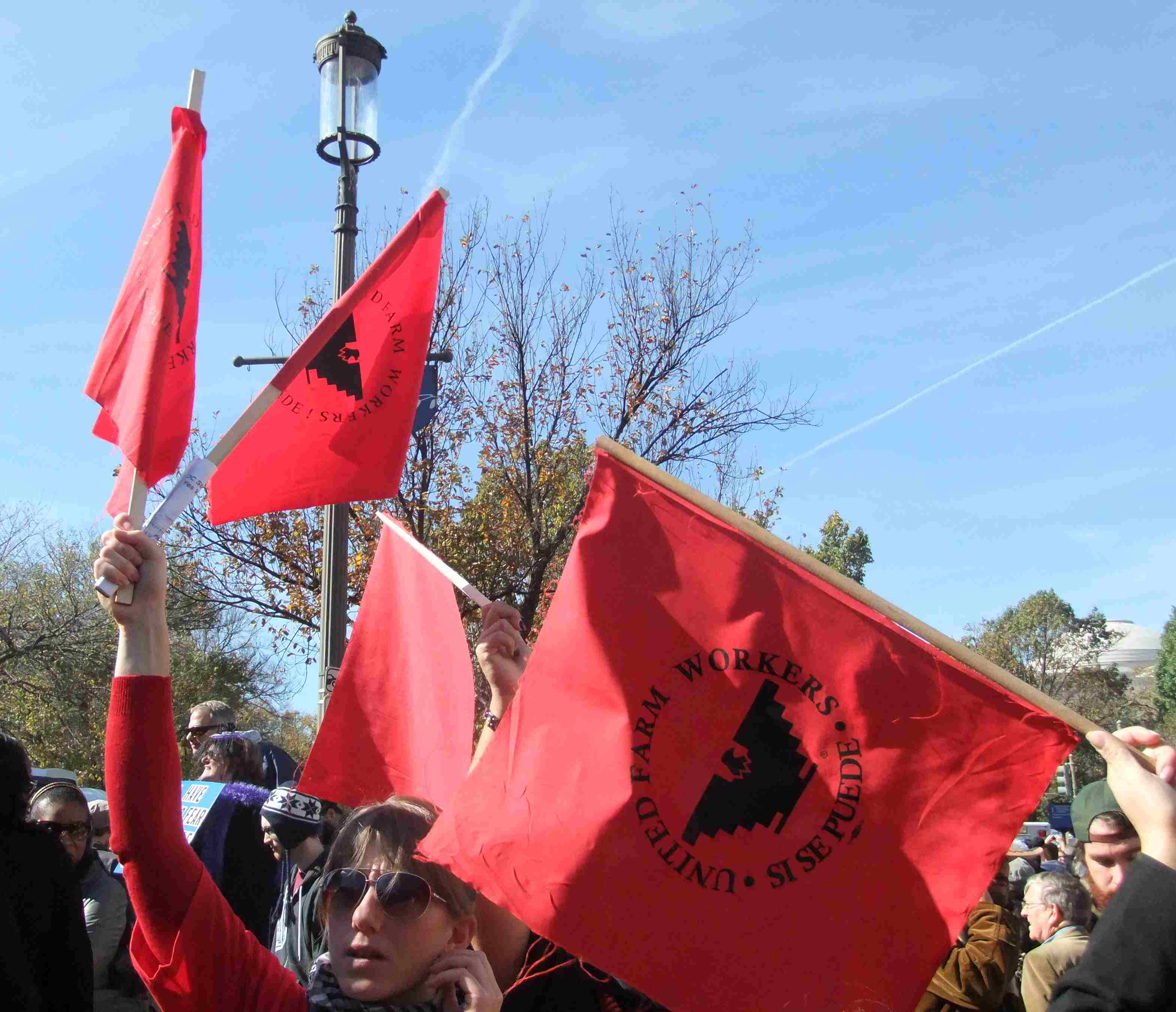
United Farm Workers with flags at a rally.

Antonio Orendain became the treasurer of the National Farm Workers Association which later became part of the United Farm Workers. After realizing that the Community Service Organization (CSO) could not help farm workers, Chavez and Orendain resigned in 1962, and Chavez founded the National Farm Workers Association which was later known as the United Farm Workers. Orendain became a founding member of The National Farm Workers Association where he worked as secretary-treasurer. With the work of the NFWA, they were able to put an end to the Bracero Program by 1964. In 1965 the NFWA began striking. They helped organize and bring nonviolence tactics to the Delano grape strike along with the Agricultural Workers Organization Committee (AWOC). In 1966, Orendain was sent to Texas to help form a union there, During his time in Texas in 1966, Orendain organized protests on the bridge between the United States and Mexico against the $1.25 minimum wage for farmers. Orendain and several others were arrested and released several hours later. Cesar Chavez called the strikes a success because they were able to organize workers, even if they were unable to put pressure on the growers economically. After several protests, Chavez requested he return to California in 1967. He feared that spreading to places like Texas was too ambitious for their unions. The opposition in Texas was stronger than in California and Chavez had begun to lose hope in the Union's ability to make a real difference in Texas. Orendain worked in California for several more years before he returned to Texas in 1969 due to difficulties with his replacement; he moved his family to San Juan. He was able to form a union presence there and set up a union office in McAllen.

=== Texas Farm Workers Union (TFWU) ===
==== Creation of the Texas Farm Workers Union ====
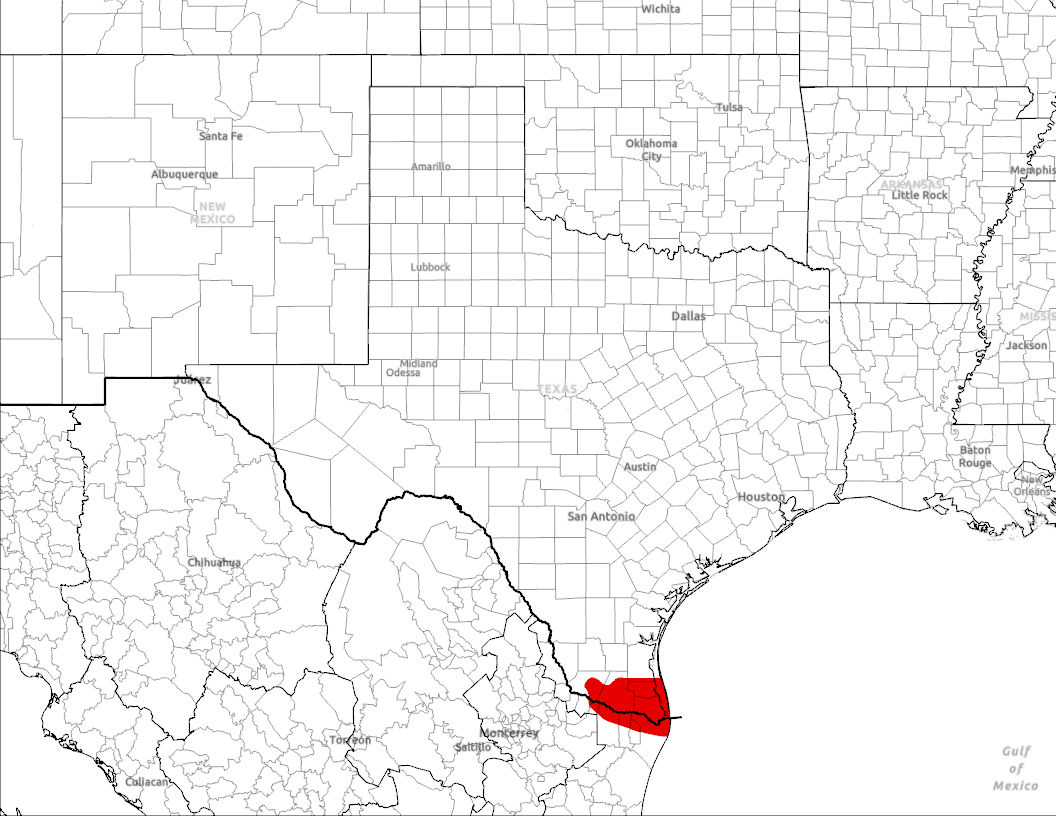
Map of Texas with the Rio Grande Valley shown in Red

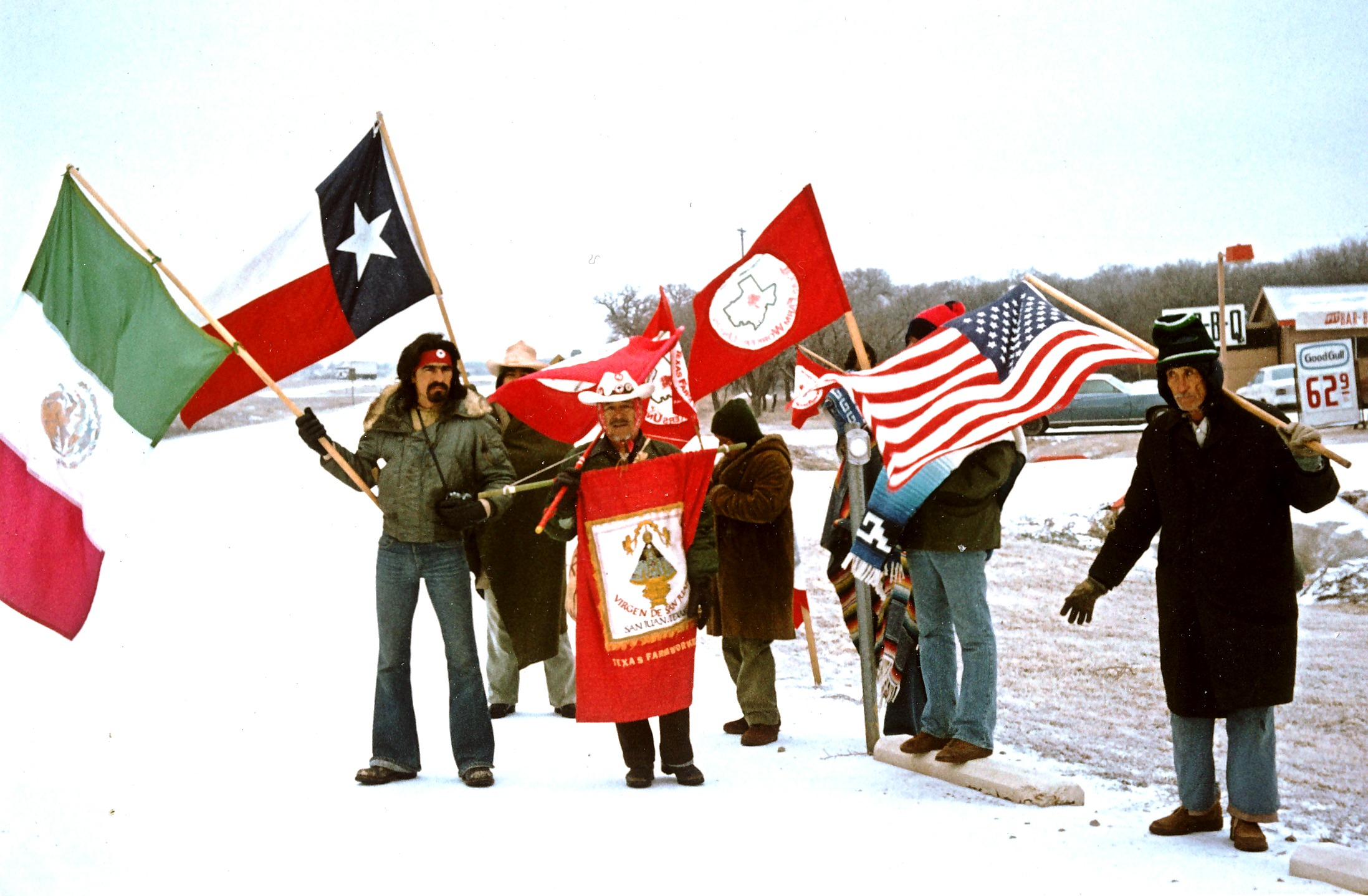
17 February 1979. Members of the Texas Farm Worker's Union at a march.

In 1975, Orendain separated from the United Farm Workers Union and created the Texas Farm Workers Union. The major reason for Orendain to split from the National Farm Workers Association and devote his time fully to Texas agricultural workers was a confrontation between El Texan Ranch and union workers where the supervisor fired strikers as well as their supporters on May 26, 1975. The Texas Farm Workers Union was created to be more specifically located for the Rio Grande Valley instead of relying on help from the National Farm Workers Union which was based in California.

==== Works of the Texas Farm Workers Union ====
They lacked funds as they were no longer associated with National Farm Workers Association and could not keep their strikers from the fields for extended periods of time. To make up for this, they used the media to raise awareness for their cause. Their strikes were successful in Presidio in making melon growers raise their wages from 60 cents to $1.25. Orendain was able to organize strikes for the union through a Spanish-Language newspaper called “El Cuhamil” and a radio show.

The Texas Farm Workers Union lobbied to pass an Agricultural Labor Relations Act to protect Texas agricultural workers by union just like industrial workers were protected by labor acts in the 1930s.

In 1977, Orendain led the Union in the March for Human Rights which marched from Austin to Washington D.C. where they formed picket lines to earn bargaining rights for Texas farm workers. Their numbers started at 40 and expanded to 10,000 by the time they reached the capital. The 1600 mile march to Washington D.C was supported by both religious and union members, but the current United States President, Jimmy Carter, refused to meet with the marchers.

==== The End of the Texas Farm Workers Union ====
The Union had a difficult time gaining support from its foundation. Union members faced severe opposition from growers and did not get financial support from the United Farm Workers Union or AFL-CIO. The Texas Farm Workers Union struggled for years with inconsistent funding and by 1982, it collapsed due to a lack of funds. Some people, however, put the end year at 1986. The legacy of the Texas Farm Workers Union was that it brought about better working conditions for Texas farmers.

== Legacy ==
Antonio Orendain was recognized by the state of Texas for his work in organizing agricultural strikes on May 26, 2009. He is remembered for bringing awareness to the poor conditions of agricultural workers including the low wages and absent health coverage. He is also known for starting the Texas Farm Workers Union (TFWU) and marching to Washington D.C. to bring awareness to the suffering of agricultural workers in Texas. Orendain was known for his encouragement of education as his children remember his encouragement to get a good education so that they could later get good jobs. Because of Orendain, agricultural workers in Texas were able to gain access to sanitary provisions including outhouses and clean water. The United Farm Workers and the Texas Farm Workers Association were both unsuccessful in mass organizing in Texas, but through small scale strikes and protests, the unions were able to bring about better resources for agricultural workers and create farm worker contracts.
