= Levin College of Public Affairs and Education =

Public administration school of Cleveland State University

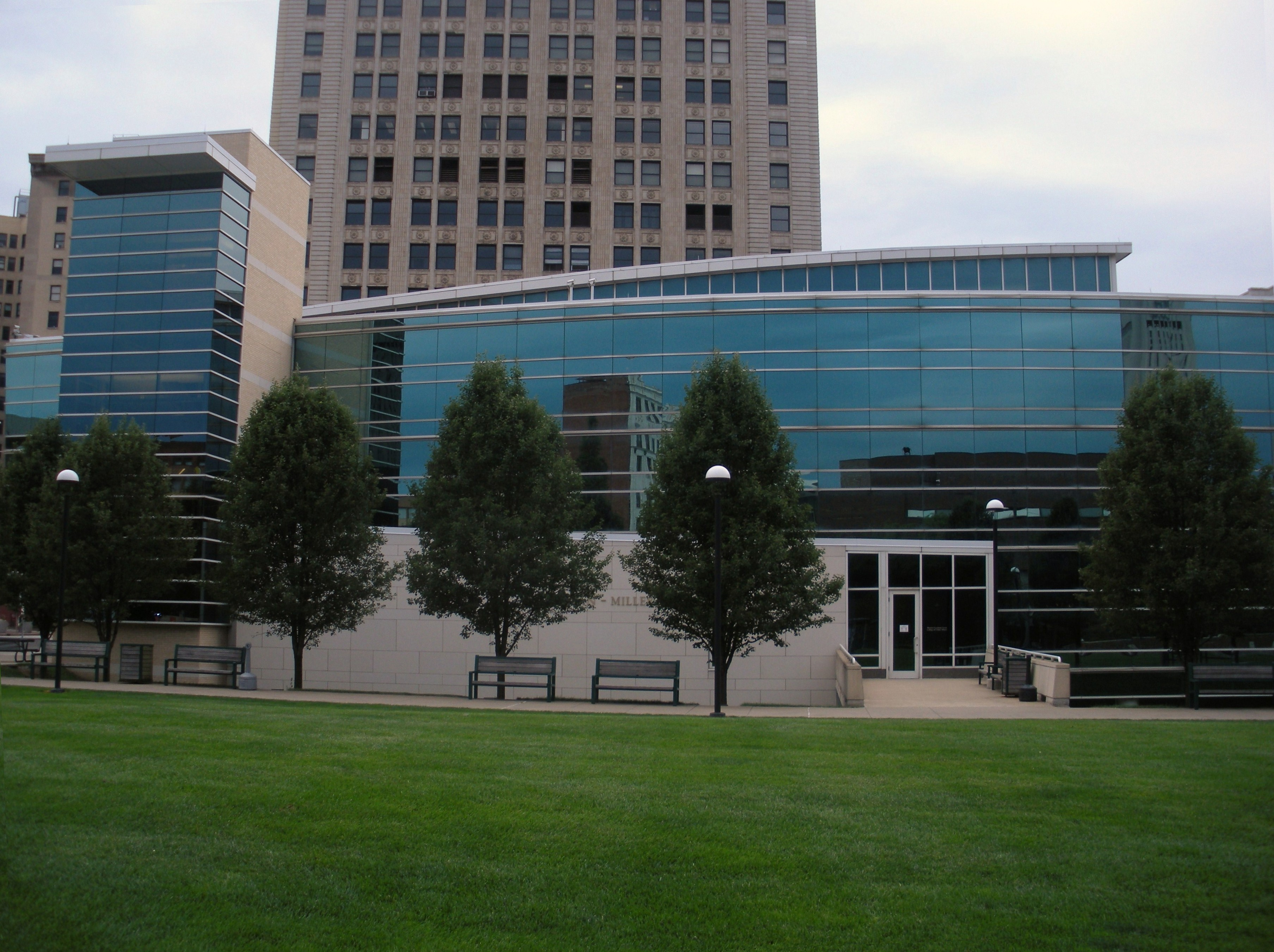
- Type: Public
- Established: 1967; 59 years ago
- Parent institution: Cleveland State University
- Affiliations: NASPAA; NACC; PAB
- Dean: Jill Gordon, Ph.D.
- Faculty: 48
- Administrative staff: 39
- Students: 645
- Undergraduates: 443
- Postgraduates: 202
- Location: Cleveland, Ohio, United States; 41°30′5.8″N 81°40′47″W
- Campus: Urban
- Website: https://levin.csuohio.edu/

The Levin College of Public Affairs and Education is an accredited college of Cleveland State University in Cleveland, Ohio. It includes the Maxine Goodman Levin School of Urban Affairs, the School of Communication, the Department of Criminology and Sociology, and the School of Education and Counseling. The Levin College offers undergraduate, graduate, and doctoral degrees, as well as professional development programs. Its urban policy research centers and programs provide communities with decision-making tools to address their policy challenges. The Levin College is recognized for offering highly ranked programs in local government management and urban policy.

The Levin College is located on the Cleveland State University campus on Euclid Avenue in the Campus District of downtown Cleveland.

In 2024, Dr. Jill Gordon, previously the Assistant Vice Provost for Faculty Affairs at Virginia Commonwealth University, was named as the college's dean.

== History ==
In 1967, following the Hough riots and student protests on campus, Dr. Thomas F. Campbell and a group of Cleveland State faculty formed the Ad Hoc Committee on Urban Studies and called on the university to form an urban institute to "bring together faculty from a wide range of specializations to work on urban problems in an interdisciplinary setting, designed in particular to facilitate communication between specialists with common interests in urban problems — linking academic specialists with the political and economic leadership of a large metropolis – [including] a full range of undergraduate courses focusing on urban problems, particularly in the social sciences."

The Institute of Urban Studies first offered classes in the fall of 1968 with the financial support of the Gund Foundation. The program was one of the first members of the Council of University Institutes of Urban Affairs, which became the Urban Affairs Association in 1981.

In 1969, Maxine Goodman Levin, founder of the Cleveland Landmarks Commission and the Cleveland Restoration Society, and a real estate developer, established the Albert A. Levin Chair of Urban Studies and Public Service in honor of her late husband. It was the first endowed chair in the country to allow the chair holder to combine classroom teachings with public service to study and work at finding solutions to urban problems. Cleveland State reorganized the Institute as the College of Urban Affairs consisting of a single department of Urban Studies in 1977. In 1989, the college was renamed the Maxine Goodman Levin College of Urban Affairs, following the benefactor's gift of an endowment to support the college. In 2022, The Levin College of Public Affairs and Education, was renamed to honor the transformational philanthropic donations to the university from Mort Levin and the Levin family. The newly formed college brings together the previous Maxine Goodman Levin College of Urban Affairs, the College of Education, communication, and sociology and criminology.

== Degree programs ==
=== Undergraduate Degree Programs ===
- School of Communication:
  - Communication studies, B.A
  - Journalism and Public Relations, B.A
- Maxine Goodman Levin School of Urban Affairs
  - Urban and Regional Studies, B.A.
  - Public Safety Management, B.A.
  - Environmental Studies, B.A.
  - Nonprofit Administration, B.A.
  - Organizational Leadership, B.A.
  - Economic Development, B.A.
- Department Of Counseling, Administration, Supervision And Adult Learning, Department Of Education Studies, Research And Technology, And Department Of Teacher Education
  - P-5 Education (PreK-3)
  - Middle Childhood Education
  - Mild/Moderate Intervention Specialist
  - Moderate/Intensive Intervention Specialist
  - Integrated Language Arts, B.A.
  - Integrated Social Studies
  - Integrated Mathematics, B.S/B.A.
  - Integrated Mathematics & Physics, B.A
  - Integrated Science, B.S.
  - Foreign Language Education
- Department of Criminology and Sociology
  - Criminology, B.A.
  - Sociology, B.A.

=== Graduate Degree Programs ===
- School of Communication
  - Master of Applied Communication Theory and Methodology (MACTM
  - Master of Communication
- Maxine Goodman Levin School of Urban Affairs
  - Master of Public Administration (MPA)
  - Master of Urban Planning and Development (MUPD)
  - Master of Nonprofit Administration and Leadership
  - M.A. in Environmental Studies
  - M.S. in Urban Studies
  - Master's Track in Diversity Leadership and Change Management
  - Ph.D. in Urban Studies and Public Affairs
- Department Of Counseling, Administration, Supervision And Adult Learning, Department Of Education Studies, Research And Technology, And Department Of Teacher Education
  - M.Ed. Degrees, Licenses, & Endorsements:
    - Adult, Professional & Higher Education
    - Community Health promotion
    - Curriculum and Instruction
    - Educational Research
    - Elementary Education
    - Secondary Education
    - Advance and Applied Teaching Elementary and Secondary Education
    - Literacy Development - Adult Literacy
    - Health Professions Education
    - Clinical Mental Health Counseling
    - Educational Leadership
    - School Counseling
    - Urban Secondary Teaching (MUST) Residency Program • 7–12
    - Early Childhood Intervention Specialist
    - Mild/Moderate
    - Moderate/Intensive
    - Early Childhood
    - Educational Technology
    - Gifted Talented Learners
    - Teacher Leader
    - Early Childhood Generalist
    - TESOL
    - Literacy Development-Reading
    - Inspired Leaders
    - Superintendent
  - Ph.D. Programs of Study:
    - Counseling Psychology
    - Adult, Continuing, and Higher Education
    - Learning and Development
    - Policy Studies
    - School Administration
    - Teaching Chinese as a Foreign Language
  - Department of Criminology and Sociology
    - M.A. in Applied Social Research

== Rankings ==
The 2022 U.S. News & World Report ranking of best public affairs graduate schools ranked the Levin College #2 in the Urban Policy specialty, #16 in the Local Government Management specialty., #23 in the Nonprofit Management specialty, and #40 in the Public Management and Leadership specialty.

The Levin College graduate urban planning degree was highly ranked in both the economic development and community development specializations in the Planetizen Guide to Urban Planning Programs - 4th Edition in 2015.

In the Planetizen Guide to Graduate Urban Planning Programs - 6th Edition in 2019, Cleveland State ranked 9th in Midwest Graduate Urban Planning Programs and 15th in Top Small Programs (Programs with fewer than 55 students enrolled on average over a three-year period).

== Student Organizations ==
CSU APA is the Levin College student group affiliated with the Cleveland section of the Ohio chapter of the American Planning Association. A student from CSU APA serves as a member of the executive committee of APA Cleveland. The student-run organization "strives to facilitate the exchange of ideas and thoughtful discussions, foster professional development, and create a sense of community among all students at Cleveland State University."

CSU ICMA is the student chapter of the International City/County Management Association, and is also affiliated with the Ohio City/County Management Association (OCMA), "the leading organization in the State of Ohio promoting and developing excellence in local government." The group partners with CSU APA to coordinate a speaker series, organize professional development events, host forums, and offer a shadowing program.

Phi Alpha Alpha, "the Global Honor Society for Public Affairs and Administration" has a chapter at Levin College.

The CSU Student Environmental Movement is a group, "dedicated to making a green difference here on campus and the surrounding Cleveland area."

== Research Centers ==
The Levin College houses research centers and programs that provide urban leaders with decision support tools, technical assistance, and data analysis educational services.

- Center for Community Planning and Development
- Center for Economic Development
- Center for Educational Leadership
- Center for Excellence and Innovation in Education
- Center for Population Dynamics
- Center for Public and Nonprofit Management
- Center for Urban Education (CUE)
- Community Learning Center for Children and Youth
- Criminology Research Center
- CSU Action Research Program
- CSUteach
- Diversity Institute
- Energy Policy Center
- Twice-Exceptional Teacher Education Program

The Levin College is also home to the additional research centers and programs including but not limited to:

- Center for Emergency Preparedness
- Community Planning Program
- Levin College Forum
- Northern Ohio Data and Information Service (NODIS)
- CSU's Office of Civic Engagement
- Ohio Center for the Advancement of Women in Public Service
- STEMM Education Center
- Unger Program
- Water Resilient Cities Program

== Professional Development ==
The Levin College offers courses, workshops, and seminars for individuals and organizations seeking to improve their skills as urban leaders. The college also serves as the official Certified Public Manager® (CPM) program for the State of Ohio and offers comprehensive and nationally certified development programs for state and local government leaders and public administrators.

- ArcGIS Workshop
- Certified Public Manager® Program
- Leadership Academy
- LeanOhio Boot Camp
- Public Management Academy
- Professional Development For Mental Health Professionals
- Certificate In Diversity, Equity, And Inclusion

== Notable alumni ==
- Nickie J. Antonio (MPA 1992) Ohio State Representative.
- Nan Baker (Leadership Academy 2001) former Ohio State Representative.
- Janis Bowdler (MS Urban Policy) President, JP Morgan Chase Foundation.
- Madeline Cain (MPA 1985) First female mayor of Lakewood, Ohio. Former Ohio State Representative.
- Jane Campbell (MS Urban Studies 1980) First female mayor of Cleveland, Ohio.
- Jerry Frangas (MPA 1995) former member of the Colorado House of Representatives.
- Tim Hagan (BA Urban Studies 1975) Former Cuyahoga County Commissioner and Democratic nominee for Governor of Ohio
- Stephanie Howse, (MA Environmental Studies) State Representative, House District 11 of Ohio House of Representative
- Frank G. Jackson (BA Urban Studies 1975, MA Urban Affairs 1977) Mayor of Cleveland, Ohio.
- John McNally IV (MPA/JD 1996) Former mayor of Youngstown, Ohio.
- Kahlil Seren (MS Urban Studies 2010) First Mayor of the City of Cleveland Heights, Ohio.
- Kent Smith (MS Urban Studies 2001) Ohio State Representative.
- Matt Zone (BA Urban Studies 1999) City councilman in Cleveland, Ohio and president of the National League of Cities.
