= Gino Perente =

American DJ and communist activist (1937–1995)

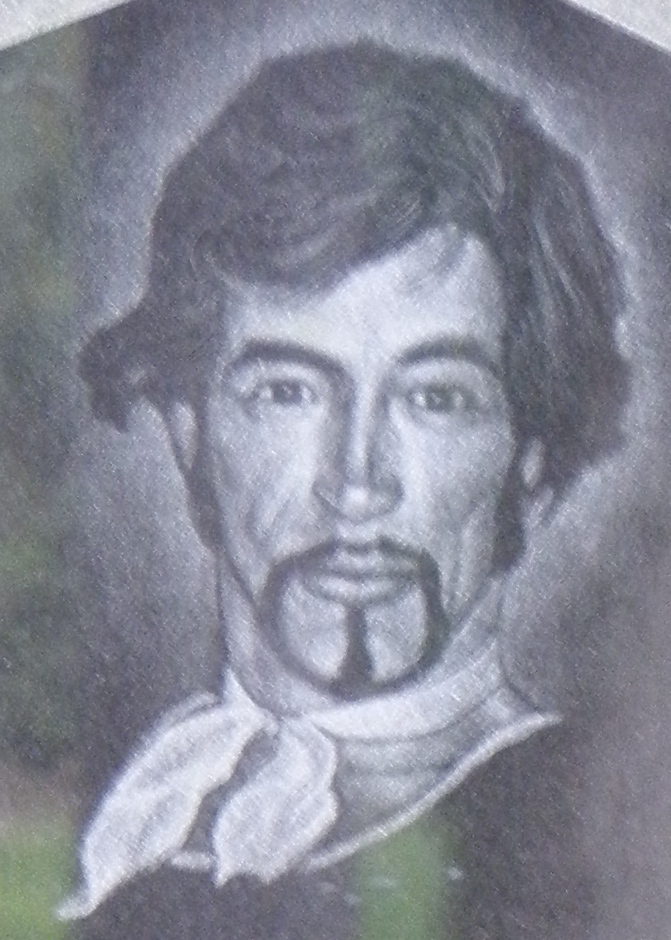
Gino Perente as depicted on his grave stone in the Oak Hill Cemetery, Stony Brook, New York

Eugenio Mario Perente-Ramos (Gino Perente) (21 November 1937 – 18 March 1995) was the founder of the National Labor Federation (NATLFED), a collection of anti-poverty organizations in the United States. While canvassing door-to-door and operating assistance programs for the poor, NATLFED has also been described by critics as a left-wing or syncretic "political cult." Some reporters, cult-watchers, and the US Federal Bureau of Investigation (FBI) inferred in the early 1980s that Perente was born Gerald William Doeden, a disc jockey from California.

== As Gerald Doeden ==
Gerald Doeden was born in Crookston, Minnesota and grew up in Idaho and Yuba City/Marysville, California. He was an amateur actor who performed in plays at Yuba College.

While in college, Doeden was injured in a car accident and walked with a limp for the rest of his life. He was known in Marysville as a small-scale con artist.

Doeden married Ruth Mikkelsen in 1960, and had a daughter. Doeden, however, reportedly also fathered a child outside of his marriage. He and Mikkelsen were divorced in 1962, and he later spent some time in jail for non-payment of child support. Some observers have suggested that he may have left California to avoid child support payments.

== Early activism ==
After working in Yuba City as a DJ for the radio station KAGR for about five years, Doeden began working at the Little Red Bookstore in San Francisco, where he went by aliases such as "Claude" and "Gino Savo."

A number of individuals associated with the store reportedly formed a short-lived group called Liberation Army Revolutionary Group Organizations (LARGO). In March 1970, the group sent letters to government offices "announcing that armed guerrilla groups were about to attack public buildings." LARGO's only published statement, was a proclamation of intent to overthrow the government starting on March 15, 1970. While this quickly attracted the attention of the authorities, the group was described as quixotic by the media and dismissed by law enforcement.

== Involvement with United Farm Workers Organizing Committee and foundation of EFWA ==
Around 1970 Doeden left California and resurfaced in New York City as "Gino Parenti". There he worked briefly in 1971 for the United Farm Workers Organizing Committee, the predecessor of United Farm Workers of America (UFW) in its New York office. After taking charge during a power vacuum, he was fired when UFW sent Jose Gomez to head the office. About 20 years later, he was remembered by Dolores Huerta as a "colorful biker type who played a small role in the boycott for about nine months or a year.... He created a lot of problems for the union, attacking us in the press. Then he went off and formed his own group." After leaving UFW, Perente founded the Eastern Farm Workers Association (EFWA) in Suffolk County, New York, an agricultural region on Long Island.

== As head of EFWA and NATLFED ==
Within a few years, Perente's followers had started similar organizations patterned on EFWA in California and elsewhere on the east coast, and eventually one farm worker organizing drive had spawned a network of twenty such drives, called the National Labor Federation (NATLFED).

By the late 1970s, Perente's activities were increasingly limited to giving lectures to volunteers interpreting the writings of Karl Marx, Vladimir Lenin, and Joseph Stalin and directing the daily activities of his volunteers. Perente also co-authored a number of tracts, including The Essential Organizer, the training manual of the EFWA, and "The Genesis," a story of the origins of NATLFED claiming that the party was part of a secret International including the Communist Party of Cuba, the Sandinistas and revolutionaries in Chile and El Salvador, and that members of the Venceremos were among its founders.

Perente retreated from public view in the mid- to late-1970s. Individuals associated with Perente purchased 1107-1115 Carrol St, an apartment building in the Crown Heights neighborhood of Brooklyn, and he lived there, surrounded by volunteers for his organizations, for the rest of his life. Some ex-full-time volunteers have alleged that Perente was a drug addict, sexually harassed female volunteers, and regularly physically abused some volunteer organizers during this period. In 2016 former cadre Sonja Larsen's memoir Red Star Tattoo- My Life as a Girl Revolutionary was published by Random House Canada. The book details her personal relationship with Gino Perente/Gerald Doeden and the emotional, physical and sexual abuse of women which she witnessed while living at the safe house around the time of the organization's revolutionary 'countdown.'

== Death ==
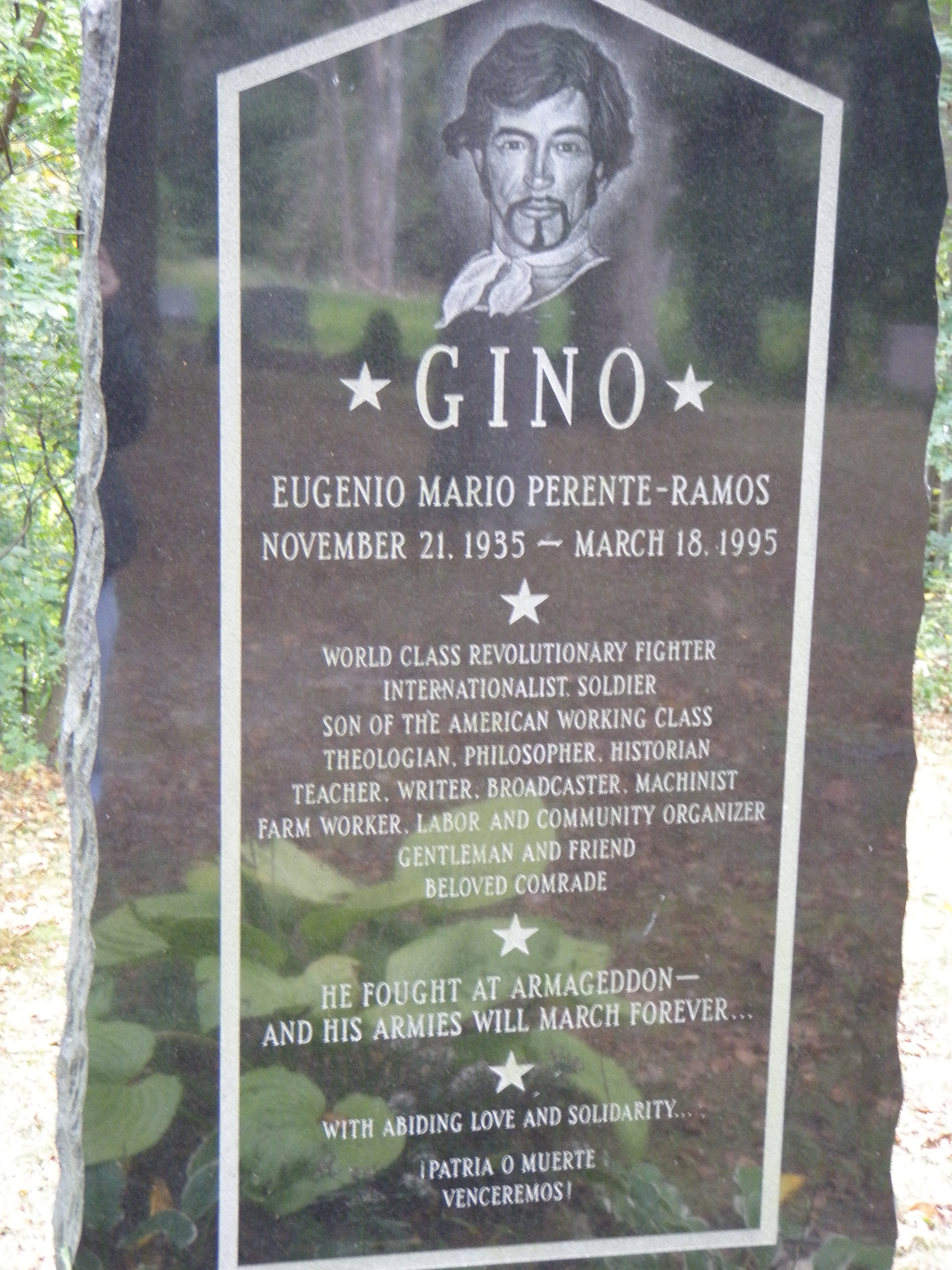
Gino Perente's grave stone in the Oak Hill Cemetery, Stony Brook, New York

Perente died March 18, 1995, in the Crown Heights apartment of congestive heart failure. He was buried at Oak Hill Cemetery in Stony Brook, NY by the organization he founded. The New York Times printed his obituary, and then a correction. The initial obituary relied primarily on information from two close associates, Daniel Fiske and Christopher Day. The Times was then contacted by his former wife, former colleagues, and longtime critics of Perente, including Chip Berlet, and, after fact checking the initial obituary, the Times issued a corrected obituary the next day.

== Publications ==
- Perente, Eugenio Mario (1973). The Essential Organizer. Eastern Farmworkers Association, s.l.
