= Farm Labor Organizing Committee =

Labor union representing migrant farmer workers

FLOC
- Farm Labor Organizing Committee
- Founded: 1967
- Headquarters: Toledo, Ohio
- Location: United States
- Members: 23,300
- Key people: Baldemar Velasquez
- Affiliations: AFL–CIO
- Website: www.floc.com

The Farm Labor Organizing Committee (FLOC) is a labor union representing migrant farm workers in the Midwestern United States and North Carolina.

== History ==
FLOC was founded in Toledo, Ohio, in 1967 by Baldemar Velasquez. A migrant worker who had worked in the fields since he was six years old, Velasquez led his first strike at the age of 12. By the time he was 20 years old and a college student, Velasquez had already faced numerous beatings and arrests. But in 1967, with the help of his father and others, Velasquez organized FLOC among migrant field workers picking tomatoes in Ohio.

FLOC's initial organizing strategy was to focus on workers, as most unions did. FLOC organizers followed migrant workers year-round, moving south to Texas and Florida every winter to build an organizing base.

=== Campbell's Soup boycott ===
In 1978, Velasquez decided to adopt a new organizing strategy. The union believed that Ohio tomato growers would be unable to recruit enough workers to see them through a long strike. So that year 2,000 FLOC members walked off their jobs in Ohio. While some growers were willing to negotiate, big canners such as the Campbell's were unwilling to pay the higher prices which would accompany a unionized workforce. FLOC initiated a boycott of Campbell's. Six years later, not much had changed even though FLOC had conducted a well-publicized 560-mile march from Toledo to Campbell Soup headquarters in Camden, New Jersey, in 1983. Even the support of the National Council of Churches and a group of Catholic bishops in Ohio failed to sway the company.

In 1984, FLOC asked labor organizer and consultant Ray Rogers for help. Rogers developed a corporate campaign strategy which included a resolution and well-publicized demonstration at a Campbell Soup shareholder meeting. " 'You had these little nuns get up at stockholders' meetings saying I have one share and you're a dirty so and so,' says John Dunlop, secretary of labor in the Ford administration, who was involved in the FLOC battle." The company's public image began to suffer. FLOC then targeted three members of Campbell's board of directors for economic pressure. FLOC also picketed Philadelphia National Bank, one of Campbell's major creditors. Shortly thereafter, depositors threatened to pull $500,000 out of the bank.

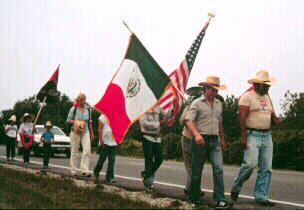
FLOC marches to Camden, New Jersey, to put pressure on the Campbell's Soup Co.

In 1985, Campbell's agreed to establish a commission to implement an anti-poverty program among its workers. Chaired by Dunlop, the commission began acting as a labor relations board. In the fall of 1985, Campbell's officials agreed to negotiate with FLOC. In February 1986, FLOC, the growers and Campbell's announced a collective bargaining agreement which recognized FLOC as the workers' representative and provided for wage increases, grievance resolution, health insurance, and committees to study pesticide safety, housing, health care, and day care issues. Campbell's agreed to purchase a fixed portion of growers' crops, a guarantee that allowed growers to increase wages without fear that Campbell's would take its business elsewhere. Shortly thereafter, FLOC reached deals with Vlasic, Heinz, Green Bay Foods (now part of Dean Foods), Aunt Jane's (now part of Dean Foods) and Dean Foods. Within a year, FLOC had also signed pacts with 23 of the largest cucumber growers in Ohio and Michigan as well.

=== Continuing pressure ===
FLOC continued to address issues related to its collective bargaining agreement in the late 1980s. Midwestern tomato farmers began complaining that the Campbell's Soup pact was not adequate. Campbell's purchased only a portion of their product, but the higher costs of wages and benefits affected their entire crop. Thus, Midwestern growers argued that they could no longer compete with cheap Mexican-grown products. Velasquez contacted Mexican farm worker unions, then in the midst of their own collective bargaining negotiations. Velasquez pressured the Mexican unions to demand significantly higher wages. The strategy was successful: The higher Mexican wages and benefits closed the price differential, and Midwestern growers no longer threatened to break their pact with FLOC.

FLOC also fought back against subtle state-sponsored pressure. The union successfully sued the Ohio Highway Patrol (OHP) in September 1996 for stopping Hispanic migrant workers without justification and, in some cases, confiscating green cards. In December 1997, a federal district court judge issued a preliminary injunction restricting the OHP from questioning motorists about immigration status and seizing immigration documents.

FLOC also began to expand its organizing efforts. The union sought to protect its gains in the cucumber fields by organizing migrant workers in the nation's second-largest cucumber-growing region—North Carolina.

=== Mt. Olive Pickle boycott ===
FLOC began organizing cucumber pickers and pickle processing workers in North Carolina in the early 1990s. The union's efforts had made little headway by the mid-1990s, however. In October 1998, FLOC announced a boycott of Mount Olive Pickle Company, the major pickle processor in the state. The union targeted the pickle processor because it correctly believed that growers would not agree to raise wages unless Mount Olive agreed to pay more for cucumbers. The organizing campaign was a difficult one. Four FLOC organizers were arrested on August 12, 1998 after visiting workers at a tobacco farm in Nash County, North Carolina. A local judge threw out the charges, saying the organizers had broken no laws.

The union's five-year boycott of Mount Olive Pickle was ultimately successful. A highlight of the organizing drive was a four-day, 70-mile march from Mount Olive, North Carolina, to Raleigh. On September 16, 2004, FLOC signed a collective bargaining agreement with Mount Olive and the growers. More than 6,000 of the state's 10,000 guest workers joined FLOC, boosting the union's membership to more than 23,000. The Association covered a number of cash crops, such as Christmas trees and tobacco, in addition to cucumbers.

The Mount Olive agreement marked the first time an American labor union represented guest workers. FLOC quickly established a program to bring guest workers into the United States under the H-2A temporary guest worker visa program.

FLOC kept the pressure going in North Carolina even after the contract was ratified. In 2001, working with the United Farm Workers, FLOC had sued the United States Department of Labor for failing to force cucumber growers to raise wages for more than 30,000 guest workers. In 2005, the union won its lawsuit. Employers were forced to pay $1.4 million lawsuit to North Carolina workers who had deductions illegally taken from their pay.

A federal district court judge ruled that growers belonging to the North Carolina Growers Association had to pay guest workers' visa and transportation fees. The ruling saved guest workers nearly $2 million a year.

FLOC announced a second major organizing drive throughout the Deep South at its triennial convention in September 2006.

=== Cruz assassination in Mexico ===
On April 10, 2007, FLOC organizer Santiago Rafael Cruz was found bound and beaten to death in the group's office in Monterrey, Mexico. FLOC had opened an office next to the U.S. consulate in the city in 2005 to help guest workers process their visas and to organize these incoming guest workers into the union. However, when Mexican police announced that a suspect had been arrested in Cruz's death, they stated "he died for failing to deliver on a shady $4,500 promise to provide visas for the friends of his alleged killer". The $4,500 was to arrange for documents for "other people so they could go to the United States to work...". The group's Monterrey offices had been broken into several times in the past year, and union staff members had received a number of threats. Cruz, who was 29 years old, had supervised the Monterrey office for less than a month. The Nuevo León state police said Cruz's murder was not related to trafficking in illegal narcotics, but rather due to "a fight between unions" or "an internal fight" within FLOC. FLOC vigorously disputed the findings. FLOC officials claimed that organized crime figures had murdered Cruz in retaliation for FLOC's efforts to resolve grievances concerning abuses in the guest worker recruiting system (which FLOC says are dominated by criminal syndicates). FLOC petitioned the Inter-American Commission on Human Rights for protective measures. The Commission immediately granted the petition, which requires that the Mexican government provide FLOC members and staff with adequate law enforcement and security while in Mexico.

Two months after Cruz' death, the Mexican government agreed to require local police officers to sign in daily at FLOC's Monterrey office and agreed to install security cameras throughout the building where FLOC's offices are located. FLOC President Velasquez and Representative Marcy Kaptur (D-OH) met with officials from office of the Attorney General of Mexico to resolve problems with the implementation of the new security measures. Although the IACHR has been pressuring the Mexican government since early May to install the cameras, the Nuevo León and federal government disagree over who will pay for them. The police officer visits to the union offices also have been less frequent than promised.

=== R.J. Reynolds Campaign ===
In 2006, the North Carolina branch of FLOC began its new campaign against R.J. Reynolds Tobacco Company. FLOC president Baldemar Velazquez spoke of the tragic and preventable deaths of at least four migrant tobacco workers in the summer of 2006 in North Carolina. The aim of the new campaign was to put pressure on Big Tobacco executives to change its abusive procurement system.

Tobacco corporations have control throughout the levels of tobacco procurement. Due to their monopoly, they control the prices they pay growers, and therefore the wages paid to field workers. There are deceptive layers of subcontractors throughout this system, designed to avoid responsibility for what happens down the chain. Nevertheless, tobacco corporations have the power to change this system and directly improve the lives of the workers who harvest their product.

FLOC seeks to change the abusive structure of the procurement system through a multi-party agreement between the corporation, the growers and the farmworkers. Thus far, Reynolds CEO Susan Ivey has refused to meet with FLOC representatives. FLOC continues to put pressure on Reynolds to meet and attended a May 2008 shareholder meeting to raise the issue and to support a shareholder resolution calling for the company to establish a human rights protocol throughout its supply chain. The resolution had the support of the shareholder advisory service ISS and received a significant 13% of the vote.

On May 3, 2012, FLOC and several different organizations came together and disrupted a meeting of CEOs at R.J. Reynolds Headquarters, demanding that the crimes of the company against tobacco farmworkers be acknowledged and that certain action be taken to relieve the pain and suffering these workers are enduring in the tobacco fields. The short-term goal was in pressuring them to finally set up a meeting between R.J.R. and FLOC. Their goal was achieved. Soon after the meeting, FLOC and their allies flooded the streets of Winston-Salem, North Carolina, and held a long march to both celebrate their first victory and to continue the ongoing pressure against R.J.R.

== Structure ==
FLOC is governed by its membership. The membership elects delegates, who meet every four years (effective Convention 2009). FLOC held its first membership meeting—called a "constitutional convention"—in 1979. Members set dues, approve policy statements and broad programmatic guidance, and elect officers. Currently, FLOC members pay 2.5% of their base wages as dues.

Between conventions, FLOC is governed by a Board of Directors. The board includes the three officers—the international president, international vice president, and international secretary-treasurer—and four at-large board members. All board members are elected for four-year terms. At its 13th Constitutional Convention in 2017, delegates elected the following individuals as board members:

- Baldemar Velásquez, president
- Cruz Diaz Montalvo, vice president
- Mario Vargas, secretary-treasurer
- Sergio Sanchez, member at large
- Santiago Ramirez, member at large
- Mike Rizo, member at large

Between executive board meetings, FLOC's day-to-day operations are governed by the three officers, led by the president.

FLOC has a number of programs which it has implemented to improve the lives of its members. Since 1971, FLOC has offered educational programs, established food and fuel cooperatives, and run legal clinics for both members and non-members.

After it achieved its contract with Campbell's Soup, FLOC sought a charter from the AFL–CIO. The AFL–CIO initially chartered FLOC as a directly affiliated local union. However, in February 2006, FLOC changed its affiliation with the AFL–CIO and became a fully chartered international union.

While FLOC has a good working relationship with the United Farm Workers (UFW), neither union has sought merger with the other. In 1993, FLOC president Velasquez expressed doubt that his members would approve a merger.

== See also ==
- Obreros Unidos
- Texas Farm Workers Union
- Farm Worker Movement
- Sr. Evelyn Mattern, farmworker advocate in North Carolina
