= Texas Farm Workers Union =

Trade union in the United States

- TFWU
- Founded: 1975
- Headquarters: Texas
- Location: United States
- Key people: Antonio Orendain

The Texas Farm Workers Union (TFWU) was established by Antonio Orendain and farmworker leaders of the Rio Grande Valley active with the United Farm Workers after a disagreement with UFW leadership over direction of a melon strike in south McAllen, Texas, in 1975.

in August 1975, nearly ten years after he began organizing farm workers for the United Farm Workers in the Rio Grande Valley of South Texas. Orendain worked for Cesar Chavez in the Chicago UFW national grape and lettuce boycott office. After returning to South Texas Orendain left the UFW to devote himself to organizing Texas agricultural workers under a separate banner much like those who founded Obreros Unidos in Wisconsin, and the Farm Labor Organizing Committee in Ohio. It appears that there were conflicts between the United Farm Workers and the Texas Farm Workers Union.

== History ==
In 1975, a group of Rio Grande Valley farmworkers supported the foundation of the TFWU under Orendain's leadership. Because of the tensions between Chavez and Orendain, the union had a difficult time establishing itself. The TFWU faced opposition from the growers and never gained the support of the United Farm Workers Union and the AFL–CIO.

Like its California counterpart the United Farm Workers, the TFWU pressed the state of Texas to establish a Texas Agricultural Board. This effort failed in Texas where no Agricultural Board was established.

In late February 1977 union members began a 420-mile (670 km) march from San Juan, Texas, to the capital at Austin just 11 years after the first Texas farm worker march on Austin. This second march ended on April 2 at the state capitol building. That same year, Orendain led forty union members on a well publicized 1,600-mile (2,560 km) march from Austin to Washington, DC. The journey started in June 1977 and ended at the steps of the Lincoln Memorial in September. Despite making the case in Texas and nationally for the rights of Texas farm workers the union never found the financial support needed to continue as a viable labor union.

== Legacy ==
For the few years this union was in existence it struggled to survive and support itself being officially independent and lacking support from its natural allies in the United Farm Workers Union or fellow unionists in the AFL-CIO. With little or no funding, the union captured media attention thanks to the charismatic figure of Orendain and its high-profile legislative campaign and marches. The union focused attention in Texas on the plight of farmworkers in a state more or less abandoned and ignored by the United Farm Workers Union based in California which claimed to speak for all farm workers, yet failed to work to organize them outside of California with any sustained effort or resource commitment.

The TFWU was not an entity of the controversial National Labor Federation, as the Texas Farmworkers Union came into being long before Antonio Orendain and Gino Perente became acquainted.
