= National Labor Federation =

Network of volunteer organizations

- Abbreviation: NATLFED
- Founders: Gino Perente; Margaret Ribar
- Founded: 1972
- Ideology: Communism; Community organizing "Strata organizing"
- Political position: Far left

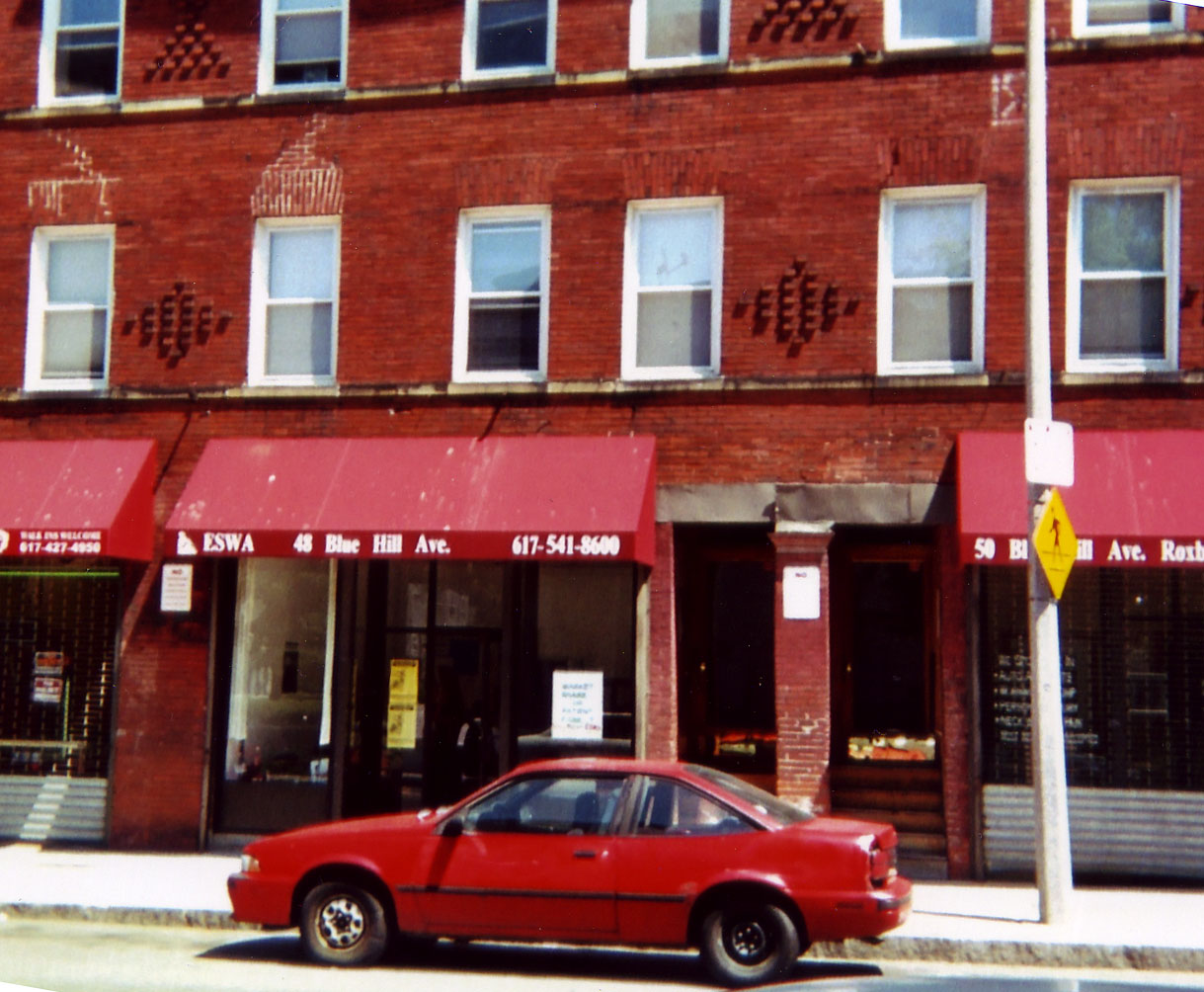
Storefront of the Eastern Service Workers Association (ESWA), a NATLFED entity in the Roxbury neighborhood of Boston in July 2007.

The National Labor Federation (NATLFED) is a network of community associations, called "entities", that claim to organize workers who are excluded from collective bargaining protections by U.S. labor law. Gino Perente founded NATLFED in 1972.

NATLFED entities keep a very low profile, operating with little public attention. Journalists who have discussed NATLFED entities have praised their social work, raised concerns about their lack of transparency, and condemned the organization's exploitative treatment of volunteers.

NATLFED's entities deny any political affiliation, but many former participants and outside observers say NATLFED is a front for the Provisional Communist Party, a communist party also founded by Gino Perente. Perente's party is officially named the Communist Party, United States of America (Provisional Wing) [CPUSA(PW)] and is also known as the Communist Party, United States of America (Provisional) [CPUSA(P)], Provisional Party, Provisional Party of Communists, Order of Lenin, or simply the Formation. The CPUSA(PW) allegedly includes much of NATLFED's leadership.

The CPUSA(PW) is clandestine and has no party publications, conventions, or leadership elections. CPUSA(PW) members do not openly acknowledge its existence. Virtually all CPUSA(PW) members are full-time volunteers in NATLFED entities. Outside estimates cap membership at between 100 and 300 core members. CPUSA(PW) has virtually no identifiable offices or centers of operations.

During Perente's lifetime he exercised full control over the party, communicating directly with members through long orations held at his office in Brooklyn, New York, through audiotapes of those speeches sent to members running the various NATLFED entities, and through rare printed manuals, such as Perente's 1973 mimeographed The Essential Organizer.

== Ideology ==
NATLFED literature asserts the principle that "every man, woman and child is entitled to adequate and appropriate food, clothing, shelter and medical care as basic human rights."

Carlotta Woolcock, an organizer for Northwest Seasonal Workers Association (NSWA), described its goal as providing "a voice for the poor and working people that is independent from the government", because what "most people vote for is the lesser of two evils offered them".

Critics claim that NATLFED's focus on the poor is just cover for more sinister activity. Jeff Whitnack told The Boston Globe, "They are like political Moonies. They use poor people as flypaper to attract members."

== Practices ==
NATLFED consists of several dozen mutual benefit associations and organizers who canvass working-class neighborhoods and coordinate assistance programs operated by members and volunteers of the associations. According to the groups' literature, these benefit programs provide members with basic emergency food, clothing, medical and dental care, legal advice, child care, and job referrals.

Since Perente's death in 1995 and the raid on its headquarters in 1996, there has been little information about how NATLFED is run, though Margaret Ribar is reported to have assumed leadership.

=== Secrecy ===
It is difficult to get information about NATLFED and its entities because the organization is institutionally secretive. An internal memo quoted in the East Bay Express in 1984 gave the following instructions on withholding information from outsiders:

We regard outside inquiry from a position of distrust. [...] Never ask to know more than you need to know if you agree with the goals and strategy of the group. It's unfair to burden a comrade with unneeded information, and also unprofessional. The standard answer to any question you have not been instructed to answer is "It's not my department."

Some entity operations managers have been directed not to give interviews to reporters; others have insisted that reporters volunteer with the organization to get a story on it; and volunteers have given reporters a runaround.

=== Strata organizing ===
NATLFED entitites support "strata organizing", which focuses on "unrecognized workers" who are unable to organize due to the "dubious benefits of the National Labor Relations Act." Instead of conventional union organizing, NATLFED argues that "local community-based associations" must unite unrecognized workers with "current and former union workers, retired workers, local business leaders, professionals and others who share a common concern for the long-term future of our communities".

NATLFED entities are not themselves labor unions. The various entities identify themselves with the labor movement for the purpose of attracting volunteers and supporters, but when describing their organization make clear that they do not advocate the formation of trade unions per se, calling themselves "labor organizations of a new type".

=== Cadre recruitment ===
NATLFED entities are managed by full-time volunteers, called cadre, many of whom have dedicated their lives to the movement.

NATLFED aggressively recruits new cadre from the ranks of volunteers who participate. NATLFED entities send speakers to churches, residential neighborhoods, shopping centers, university campuses, music festivals, and other venues to introduce themselves and solicit volunteers and resources. At these events, organizers read a brief introduction to the organization to new volunteers and try to schedule visits to their office and participation in volunteer-run activities.

NATLFED also has an elaborate system for persuading volunteers to further the organization's goals by assuming roles of authority themselves, and the social pressure they apply convinces some volunteers to de-emphasize goals of their own. Regular volunteers are periodically interviewed and asked to increase their commitment to the organization.

Former members claim that deception and psychological manipulation mix with the sensation some new recruits experience of an intellectual awakening as stories of past labor struggles explain the underside of U.S. history, and classes in dialectical materialism provide a coherent, if stilted, worldview. NATLFED converts' commitment is solidified by the emotional impact of working to exhaustion surrounded by others who constantly reinforce the group's message and beliefs.

For recruitment purposes, NATLFED entities keep extensive records of their contacts on index cards. Drawers of these cards contain detailed information about any sort of contact the group has with volunteers, members, donors, and other supporters. Whitnack has claimed that this elaborate paperwork is unnecessary, inefficient, and intended to exhaust the volunteers, in order to keep them in a suggestible state.

=== College campus recruitment ===
NATLFED recruits many of its members and volunteers from college campuses, through voluntary service programs, and by appeal to the larger community through speaking engagements and direct contact. For example, Western Service Workers Association (WSWA) member Mark Levine spoke to the 2004 American Sociological Association Conference about poverty and social stratification.

The Eastern Service Workers Association (ESWA) operates on numerous college and university campuses in the Northeast, quietly recruiting student volunteers through the service-learning offices available to all students. The ESWA is thriving in Boston, Massachusetts, and Rochester, New York, with assistance from several local churches and businesses that may not be aware of its practices or connection to NATLFED.

=== Mutual benefit associations ===
Recruiters from the cadre start new entities armed with lists of contacts. The recruiters approach community and business leaders with their mission statement and ask for help with founding the entity. An organizing committee is created that includes community leaders willing to at least lend their names to the new effort, and the recruiters solicit donated office space until they can purchase an office.

The entities establish a program that provides services to members free of charge and soon start door-to-door campaigns to recruit volunteers and recruit low-income workers. Available resources and the scope of the program vary, but usually include food, clothing, and holiday events for children. Some entities provide more involved services for members, such as medical, legal, and dental services for volunteers and low-income members. Critics of the organizations contend that the 11-point benefit program promises far more than the entities can deliver. Supporters use criticisms of the paucity of resources to motivate volunteers to take action to expand these resources.

Critics and supporters of the organizations agree that the cadre consumes some of the food, clothing and other goods collected for the poor. Critics and some former members have claimed that the entities are highly inefficient—that the cadre consumes much of the cash, food and clothing they purport to collect for the poor.

Volunteers for the entities canvass poor residential areas to recruit low-income members, knocking on doors and delivering a pitch that includes a brief explanation of organization, promises benefits, and asks for participation. Poor members are asked to contribute $0.62 per month as membership dues, an amount said to be the average hourly pay for workers at I. M. Young in 1972. New members also sign an authorization form giving the association vague authority to bargain on the member's behalf. The groups also solicit resources (funds, food, clothing, medical services and legal aid) from professionals, business owners, and volunteers willing to contribute to the cause.

=== Governance and financial structure ===
NATLFED entities describe themselves as independent, locally chartered membership associations that accept only private donations that come "with no strings attached", and thus claim to be answerable only to their organizing committee and to their membership. For example, the Coalition of Concerned Legal Professionals (CCLP) writes:

CCLP is not subject to the whims of constantly changing Congressional and Presidential administrations. Because CCLP does not receive federal funds, it can organize without being subject to arbitrary restrictions on representation, audits of client files, unpredictable fluctuations in income, and general harassment from LSC and OIG bureaucrats, all of which are the plight of an LSC-funded attorney in the 21st century. Unfortunately, the over 30-year history of the LSC shows that these conditions are likely to continue for the foreseeable future. CCLP does not focus merely on individual representation or the issue-oriented litigation which others rely on to gain backing.

=== Party membership and structure ===
NATLFED is substantially larger than the Communist Party, United States of America (Provisional Wing) [CPUSA(PW)]. Membership in the Party is by invitation, and invitation comes to volunteers in NATLFED entities as a revelation of the existence of the party, an explanation of the party's goals and strategy, and a brief "history" of the party, called the "genesis". This "genesis" is reportedly a narrative that includes claims that the party was part of a secret International including the Communist Party of Cuba, the Sandinistas, and revolutionaries in Chile and El Salvador, and that members of the Weather Underground were among its founders.

The Party's secrecy makes appraisal of its internal structure and functioning difficult. Testimony from former members and contacts has led various observers to characterize the CPUSA (PW) as a "political cult". For example, party members are said to live communally and spend all their time working for NATLFED entities. The leadership reportedly maintains extensive files on members and limits contact with family members, while those who attempt to leave the group are said to be subjected to intense pressure and harassment. After Perente's death in 1995, leadership of the CPUSA (PW) was assumed by Margaret Ribar, who is reported to have relaxed some of those restrictions.

The party has a Central Committee and is divided into cells, called "fractions", including a select "Military Fraction" that made news in 1996 after a raid on the party's New York headquarters resulted in the discovery of a weapons stockpile.

=== Cult allegations ===
NATLFED and its entities are often labeled a cult, are listed on cult watch websites, and have been described as a cult by various journalists. For example, in 2003, NATLFED was described as "one of the country's most extreme and controlling political cults," according to "watchdog groups and government agencies".

In a 1984 Public Eye article, the former NATLFED member Jeff Whitnack argues that the group's narrow and paranoid ideology, long working hours that sever volunteers' connections to the outside world, and deliberate schedule of mind-numbing work are all features of a cult. Later, Public Eye argued that it "no longer feels it is accurate to call Newman’s political network a cult", though "we still have strong criticisms of the group’s organizing style".

In her 2016 memoir, former NATLFED member Sonja Larsen described NATLFED as cultlike:

The sense of urgency. The time table. The secret language. The mythical elements. The sexual control. The lack of sleep. The control, internal and external, over thought and movement. The denial of self. There was a checklist, and I made a mark by nearly every line.

NATLFED supporters and organizers contest the label as loaded and misleading. For example, Western Massachusetts Labor Action (WMLA) newspaper editor Carol Rogers said, "we're definitely not a cult".

== History ==
NATLFED emerged from Gino Perente's organization the Eastern Farm Workers Association (EFWA).

Perente was by all accounts a charismatic person. He inspired volunteers with revolutionary positions and established discipline among the organizing drive's volunteers. Later accounts identified him as Gerald William Doeden, a former disc jockey from California with a less than pure reputation.

=== Origins ===
In 1971 or 1972, Perente worked in the New York office of the United Farm Workers Organizing Committee and, according to Dolores Huerta, "created a lot of problems for the union, attacking us in the press. Then he went off and formed his own group."

In 1972, Perente founded the EFWA in Suffolk County, New York. He and his followers headed to migrant labor camps in rural Long Island, New York, from an office in Bellport, New York, to organize agricultural workers. The EFWA received press attention in its early days for attempting to organize farm workers at the I.M. Young company, a potato grower. Perente organized 800 farm workers with 30 full-time EFWA staff and 70 volunteers in December 1972, when the EFWA led a strike of potato workers. This was the first union of agricultural workers on the East Coast, but the Department of Labor determined that EFWA was not a labor organization as defined by federal law.

The 1972 strike against I.M. Young remains a central part of the volunteer training process. There is little further information about the EFWA's early years.

=== Growth ===
In the mid-1970s, Perente removed himself from public view, but encouraged his followers to expand the scope of the initial organizing drives in Sacramento and Long Island. He established an office in Brooklyn to direct the growing network he called the National Labor Federation (NATLFED), and refined an elaborate system to train and ensure the loyalty of volunteers by founding the Provisional Communist Party, a secret society of his associates. Perente gave lectures offering idiosyncratic interpretations of the writings of Karl Marx, Vladimir Lenin, and Joseph Stalin to audiences at the NATLFED office.

Perente's movement used its core of volunteers to expand, sending recruiters to other cities and towns, starting about 20 mutual benefit associations and perhaps as many related support organizations by the late 1970s. The new organizing drives were built closely on the model of the EFWA, using its 1973 organizational handbook, The Essential Organizer.

In 1973, the California Homemakers Association (CHA) pressured Sacramento County and won wage increases for attendant care workers. Subsequently, the county agreed to bargain with CHA over the terms of individual contracts with its home care workers. CHA organizer David Shapiro hailed the agreement as "the first time that household workers have achieved the right to bargain".

In 1973, the NATLFED manuscript The Essential Organizer described the techniques of "systemic organizing", which purport to allow unrecognized workers to obtain needed benefits and learn how to build their own organizations. In 1978, the NATLFED manuscript Sociology and the Unrecognized Worker argued that most workers are not employed in large-scale factory operations and that new union organizing methods are therefore needed.

In the 1970s, Perente and NATLFED briefly worked with alleged cult leader Lyndon LaRouche's National Caucus of Labor Committees (NCLC). During at least 1976 and 1977, Perente and NATLFED worked and considered merging with alleged cult leader Fred Newman's International Workers Party (IWP), but did not.

In 1999, the Western Service Workers Association (WSWA) entity participated in demonstrations against physician-assisted suicide.

In 2004, members of the Western Farm Workers Association (WFWS) working in state-run migrant camps recovered illegal rent increases from the California Office of Migrant Services. The workers brought suit in 1996 and 1997 under the legal guidance and practical organizing participation of the Coalition of Concerned Legal Professionals (CCLP). WFWS member José Rodríguez said, "without organization, we could never have gotten money back". In 2006, the California State Legislature allocated $610,000 to settle Vega v. Mallory, which alleged that migrant camp workers were overcharged for rent.

In 2006, the Jackson County Fuel Committee (JCFC) or Jackson County Workers Benefit Council (JCWBC) petitioned the Ashland City Council to halt utility cutoffs. This entity distributes 30-40 cords of firewood each year to people in Jackson County, Oregon.

In 2009 the party was reported to have been involved, again through some of its front groups, in a civic struggle around the proposed rebuilding of a hospital in a low-income area of San Francisco.

=== Public scrutiny and controversy ===
In the early 1980s, several journalists wrote highly critical articles about several groups in the federation. One such article, in Christian Century magazine, described changes in the leadership of the Commission on Voluntary Service and Action (CVSA). Originally a church-affiliated nonprofit organization, the CVSA had since 1946 annually printed a catalog of volunteer opportunities called Invest Yourself: a Catalog of Volunteer Opportunities. A number of full-time NATLFED organizers had taken leadership positions on CVSA's board. In the early 1980s, when CVSA was struggling financially, NATLFED took responsibility and control of its operations, leaving some of the church leadership bitter. As many as 50 NATLFED entities were listed among about 200 service organizations in the catalog during the 1980s and 1990s. The number has since slowly declined; fewer than ten NATLFED entities were listed in the 2004 edition.

The political investigative magazine The Public Eye published two articles about NATLFED. The first, by Harvey Kahn in 1977, alleged an obscure but friendly relationship between NATLFED and Lyndon LaRouche's National Caucus of Labor Committees. Tourish and Wohlforth report a similarly tenuous but longer-lived alliance between NATLFED and Fred Newman's new International Workers Party in the mid-1970s. Perente became head of the IWP-organized Nationwide Unemployment League, and soon dissolved it.

The Public Eye published a longer exposé by former volunteer Jeff Whitnack in 1984 in which Whitnack identified Perente as Doeden and interviewed some of Doeden's friends in California. Whitnack concluded that the whole operation was a scam punctuated with drama and hints of violence.

In 2016, Random House Canada published former cadre Sonja Larsen's memoir Red Star Tattoo – My Life as a Girl Revolutionary. The book details her time growing up in field offices and moving to the organization's Brooklyn headquarters as a teenager in the 1980s. Larsen writes about her relationship with Perente/Doeden and the emotional, physical and sexual abuse of women she witnessed while living at the safe house around the time of the organization's revolutionary "countdown".

=== Police raids ===
On February 17, 1984, the Federal Bureau of Investigation raided a law office and the National Office Central (NOC) headquarters at 1107 Carroll Street in Crown Heights, Brooklyn, on tips that it "had planned a series of violent acts". Kit Decious, Kathleen Paolo, and Daniel P. Foster, three lawyers among the organization's cadre, were convicted of felony larceny and possession of forged documents relating to the 1984 departure of Mia Prior, a member of ten years; they were disbarred in New York following their convictions in the 1980s. Paolo's conviction was overturned on appeal.

On November 11, 1996, the New York City Police Department raided the NOC again on an anonymous complaint that children were being abused in the office. The police seized 49 antique firearms and $42,000 in cash, and arrested 35 people. Newspapers around the country ran columns about the group. Two of the organizers, Susan Angus and Diane Garrett, were initially convicted of misdemeanor possession of weapons, but the appeals court overturned the convictions because the search was conducted without a warrant. No evidence of child abuse was ever produced, and press coverage died down rapidly.

Shortly after the 1996 raid, an anonymous website appeared created by "an informal network of people" who were "frightened for the current members who are our children, siblings, former friends, and coworkers." The site condemned NATLFED and archived many news articles and other stories about it. The site disappeared from its original host in 2004 and is mirrored on the Wayback machine at http://users.rcn.com/xnatlfed/.

== Entities ==
NATLFED operates about 30 offices called "entities" around the U.S., concentrated in California and the Northeast. The Eastern Farm Workers Association (now in Bellport, New York and Syracuse, New York) and California Homemakers Association (in Sacramento, California) were founded in the early 1970s, and were followed by the Eastern Service Workers Association, Western Service Workers Association, the Commemoration Committee for the Black Panther Party in Oakland, California, Western Massachusetts Labor Action in Pittsfield, Massachusetts, Western Farm Workers Association in Stockton, California, Yuba City, California, and Hillsboro, Oregon, Friends of Seasonal and Service Workers in Portland, Oregon, and Northwest Seasonal Workers Association in Medford, Oregon.

Since Perente's death, several new entities have opened, including Midwest Workers Association in Chicago, Illinois, Alaska Workers Association in Anchorage, Alaska, and Mid-Ohio Workers Association in Columbus, Ohio.

Most NATLFED entities produce regular newspapers to inform supporters and volunteers and generate advertising revenue. The Women's Press Collective (WPC), for example, prints the magazine Collective Endeavor about media reform and topics concerning women, and the Coalition of Concerned Legal Professionals (CCLP) and Coalition of Concerned Medical Professionals (CCMP) each publish the quarterly newsletters The Gavel and The Verdict.

=== Currently active ===
The organizations listed below appear to be current NATLFED entities.

- Alaska Workers Association (AWA) in Anchorage, Alaska
- Bay Area Alternative Press (BAAP) in Berkeley, California
- Berkshire County Fuel Committee (BCFC) in Pittsfield, Massachusetts
- California Committee of Friends and Relatives of Prisoners (CCFRP) in California
- California Homemakers Association (CHA) in Sacramento and Santa Rosa, California
- Coalition of Concerned Legal Professionals (Sacramento, California, New York City, New York, Philadelphia, Pennsylvania) (publishes Verdict and The Gavel)
- Coalition of Concerned Medical Professionals (Central Valley/Redding, Oakland, Sacramento, Stockton, California; Bellport, Riverhead, Brooklyn, New York)
- Commemoration Committee for the Black Panther Party (Oakland, California) (Publishes The Commemorator)
- Commission on Voluntary Service and Action (CVSA) in New York City, which publishes Invest Yourself: The Catalog of Volunteer Opportunities
- Committee for South African Solidarity (CSAS) in San Francisco and Sacramento, which publishes The South Africans Beacon
- Eastern Farm Workers Association (EFWA)(Bellport, Lyons, Riverhead, Sodus, Syracuse, New York)
- Eastern Service Workers Association (ESWA) in Boston; Roxbury, Massachusetts; Atlantic City, New Jersey; New Brunswick, New Jersey; South Amboy, New Jersey; Pleasantville, New Jersey; Somerset, New Jersey; Trenton, New Jersey; Philadelphia; and Rochester, New York
- Friends of Seasonal and Service Workers (FSSW) in Portland, Oregon
- Jackson County Fuel Committee (JCFC) and Jackson County Workers Benefit Council (JCWBC) in Ashland, Oregon
- Mid-Ohio Workers Association (MOWA) in Columbus, Ohio
- Midwest Workers Association (MWA) in Chicago, Illinois
- National Equal Justice Association (NEJA) in San Diego; San Francisco; New York City; and Riverhead, New York
- Northwest Seasonal Workers Association (NWSWA) in Medford, Oregon
- Physicians Organizing Committee (POC) in San Francisco, California
- Western Farm Workers Association (WFWA) in Stockton, California, Yuba City, California, and Hillsboro, Oregon.
- Western Massachusetts Labor Action (WMLA) in Pittsfield, Massachusetts
- Western Service Workers Association (WSWA) in Anaheim, California; Oakland, California; Redding, California; Los Angeles; Sacramento; San Diego; Santa Ana, California; Santa Cruz, California; and Watsonville, California;
- Women's Press Collective (WPC) in South Brooklyn, New York, which publishes Collective Endeavor and should not be confused with the Women's Press Collective of Oakland, California
- Workers Community Service Center (WCSC) in Sacramento, California

=== Other names ===
The following names have been listed as NATLFED-run organizations in the past. Some are alternate names for active organizations and offices, others are likely defunct.

- Alianza Campesina (Modesto, CA)
- Ashland Community Service Center (Ashland, OR)
- Association of Financial Aid Students(Dayton, Shaker Heights, OH)
- Boston Committee for Community Arts (Boston, MA)
- Carroll Street Properties (New York; owner of NATLFED's Brooklyn Headquarters)
- Citizens for Migrant Workers (Northport, King's Park, NY)
- Citizens Relief Committee (Philadelphia, PA)
- Committee for Community Health and Safety (Trenton, NJ)
- Committee of Friends and Relatives of Prisoners (Bellport, Riverhead, NY)
- Earth Shock Committee (Oakland, Watsonville, CA)
- Finger Lakes Equal Justice Association (Rochester, NY)
- National Foundation for Alternative Resources (NY)
- Gregorio Duarte Memorial Oakland Community Service and Health Center (Oakland, CA)
- Junior Eason Riverhead Community Service and Health Center (Riverhead, NY)
- Long Island Alternative Press(King's Park/Smithtown, NY)
- Long Island Equal Justice Association (Riverhead, NY)
- New Jersey Labor Defense Committee (Trenton, NJ)
- Philadelphia Committee on the Community Arts (Philadelphia, PA)
- Philadelphia Community Service Center (Philadelphia, PA)
- Shasta County Community Service Center (Central Valley/Redding, CA)
- Shasta County Food Committee (Central Valley/Redding, CA)
- South/Central Los Angeles Benefits Office (Los Angeles, CA)
- Suffolk Committee for Community Arts (Bellport, NY)
- Temporary Workers Organizing Committee (New Brunswick, NJ)
- Texas Farm Workers Union (Pharr, Hildago, TX)
- Vivian Cooper Community Service Center/Trenton Community Service Center (Trenton, NJ)
- Workers Benefit Council (Alameda County, CA; Rochester, NY)
- Writers and Scholars Institute (Princeton, NJ)

=== Source of lists ===
Invest Yourself:A Catalog of Volunteer Opportunities, published by the Commission on Voluntary Service and Action, once listed about forty organizations affiliated with NATLFED.

NATLFED does not produce a public list of its entities, but the individual organizations have usually been open about their participation in the network.

In a 1978 manuscript, NATFLED listed several of its "organizing drives". Almost all the NATLFED entities were listed in the publication Invest Yourself between 1984 and the mid-1990s, using nearly identical descriptions:

The descriptions of them—there are 38 in all—read very similarly: they are said to be "mutual benefits associations," providing the necessities of life to "the lowest paid strata" of unorganized workers, while applying a strategy of "systemic organizing&" to produce "permanent change" in their conditions. They all say as well that volunteers need no experience; they will be trained by professional organizers.

== Conclusions differ ==
The NATLFED network's various organizations have nearly identical rhetoric and training procedures, though they are spread out in many cities. Many of their donors and supporters speak up in defense of the services they provide for their communities. Former NATLFED cadre Robin Spellman-Fahlberg, who was an operations manager with Upstate NY EFWA for a decade, said in 2004 that in addition to helping in the most disenfranchised communities:

There is also a hidden, for want of a better description, evil, side of NATLFED. When I was there, and from what I've heard continues to be the case, there were manipulative people in powerful positions. Full-timers were subjected to an increasingly severe mental abuse and subjugation. ... They felt the only way to help poor people was through Natlfed, that there was no possible success for them after leaving, and/or they were subject to physical threats if they did.

Other entity members share a more positive experience, such as Western Service Workers Association (WSWA) entity member Shari Beck:

Shari Beck, a retired school teacher, has been volunteering at WSWA for the past three years. "Everybody who helps out can make things better," Beck said. "I feel like I'm doing something for the community." Beck, who volunteers alongside her husband, believes that by volunteering at WSWA, she has become more aware of things going on in her community. "We wanted to spend time in the community," Beck said.

== See also ==
- On the Edge: Political Cults Right and Left
- Lyndon LaRouche
- Fred Newman
