= University of Wisconsin–Milwaukee School of Education =

Academic Institution

Coordinates: 43°04′32.6″N 87°52′44.4″W

- Type: Public
- Established: 1951
- Dean: Carol Colbeck
- Students: 2,693
- Postgraduates: 735
- Location: Milwaukee, Wisconsin, United States
- Campus: University of Wisconsin–Milwaukee
- Website: www.uwm.edu/soe
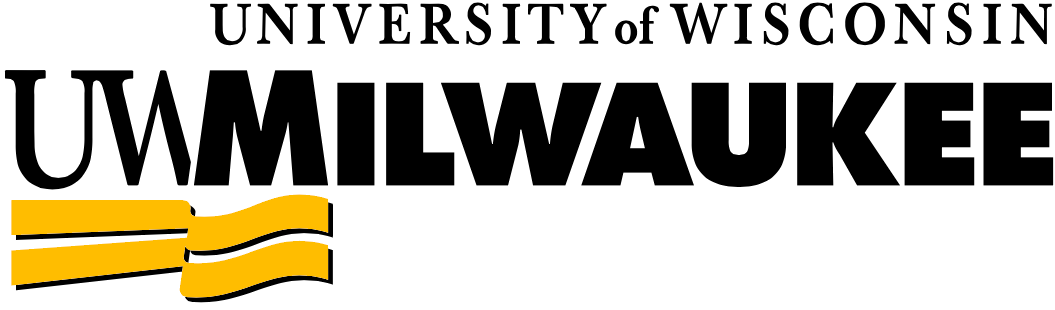

The University of Wisconsin–Milwaukee School of Education is an academic division of the University of Wisconsin–Milwaukee. It offers five undergraduate majors, five master's, and 12 doctoral programs. It also offers the only four-year interpreter training degree in Wisconsin.

The school was ranked 86th nationally by U.S. News & World Report in 2011.

== History ==
The School of Education’s history is intertwined with the history of UWM. The school’s predecessor, Milwaukee Normal School, opened in 1885 to train teachers in downtown Milwaukee at 18th Street and Wells Avenue. In 1909, the Normal School moved to its new location, the Milwaukee Normal School Building (today’s Mitchell Hall on the UWM campus). The Normal School became Milwaukee State Teachers College, offering four-year degrees. In 1951, Milwaukee State Teachers College became Wisconsin State College (WSC), Milwaukee, with liberal arts degrees. WSC merged with UW Milwaukee Extension to form UWM.

== Departments ==
- Administrative Leadership
- Curriculum and Instruction
- Education Outreach
- Educational Policy and Community Studies

- Educational Psychology
- Exceptional Education
- Urban Education Doctoral Program

== Academic Centers ==
- Center for Mathematics and Science Education Research
- Center for New and Professional Educators
- Early Childhood Research Center (ECRC)
- Institute for Intercultural Research

== Notable people ==
- Martin Haberman, educator, university professor
- Golda Meir, fourth Prime Minister of Israel, one of the founders of the State of Israel
- Bruce Weber, men's basketball head coach at University of Illinois at Urbana-Champaign
