= Obreros Unidos =

- United Workers
- Founded: 1966
- Dissolved: 1971
- Headquarters: Wisconsin
- Location: United States
- Key people: Jesus Salas

Obreros Unidos (1966–1971) was an independent agricultural labor union founded in Wisconsin in 1966 by Mexican American civil rights activists Jesus Salas, Francisco Rodriguez and many more, originally Texas-based farm workers from the small town of Crystal City. The union took root after a march from Wautoma, Wisconsin, to Madison, Wisconsin that state's capitol to protest the working conditions of the thousands of annual Mexican-American migrant workers who traveled from Texas to Wisconsin each year. This protest march was inspired by the similar march of César Chávez' United Farm Workers (UFW) in California earlier that spring, and the Texas Farmworker march on Austin, Texas of 1966. Obreros Unidos engaged in its first labor action by seeking to organize migrant potato harvest and processing workers in the town of Almond, WI, and received support from the AFL-CIO, Cesar Chavez, and other labor unions.

The name means "united workers" in Spanish.

== Cucumber organizing ==
Obreros Unidos organized workers in the cucumber harvest in 1967 organizing the mainly Texas-Mexican or Tejano workers of Libby's foods. They came up with a novel organizing strategy which aimed to organize workers in Texas before the actual harvest season in Wisconsin began. Since many of the labor organizers were themselves migrants or former migrants like Jesus Salas, the union spent many months in South Texas organizing workers so that when they moved for recognition in Wisconsin, they had already built the membership required to call for a vote and representation before the Wisconsin Employment Relations Commission (WERC). The WERC was the first labor board to recognize the rights of agricultural workers to collectively bargain at the state level in the Mt. Nebo Fur Farm case in October, 1964. Under federal law agricultural workers were not covered by labor law under the National Labor Relations Act, but in Wisconsin they were protected by state law provisions. Such protections were won for farm workers in California under the California Agricultural Labor Relations Act a decade after the right was recognized for Wisconsin's agricultural workers and tested several times by Obreros Unidos.

== La Voz Mexicana newspaper ==
The union published "La Voz Mexicana" as a public service during its years of activity. "La Voz" or "The Voice" provided Mexican-American farm workers in Wisconsin with information on minimum wage, worker's compensation, child labor, and health provisions for migratory farm workers as well as information on the various Mexican American civil rights efforts in California and Texas to the primarily interstate workers who harvested cucumbers and canned vegetables in Central and Southeastern Wisconsin.

== Decline and legacy ==
In the late 1960s the union established a gas and auto-repair co-op, a legal aid office, and other services for migrant workers and members. It also came under the direct control of Cesar Chavez' union, a change in organizational affiliation that many activists wanted but which may have drained its meager resources as Chavez moved the best organizers into positions working to support the California union's grape boycott effort. By 1970, the union broke with Chavez and entered the cannery organizing field, but this move led to a loss of support from the AFL-CIO, and the union rejected an offer to become a Teamster's affiliate union out of loyalty to Chavez even after he had abandoned the union.

Although this union lasted only 6 years many of its organizers went on to work for the United Farm Workers grape boycott effort and other Mexican-American organizations in Wisconsin and Texas including United Migrant Opportunity Services, Inc., La Raza Unida Party, and elected and appointed offices in Wisconsin and Texas.

== See also ==
- Farm Labor Organizing Committee
- Texas Farm Workers Union
