= Serena Gonzales-Gutierrez =

American politician (born 1981)

Member of the Denver City Council at-large
- Incumbent
- Assumed office July 17, 2023

Member of the Colorado House of Representatives from the 4th district
- In office January 4, 2019 – August 4, 2023
- Preceded by: Dan Pabon
- Succeeded by: Tim Hernández

Personal details
- Born: November 22, 1981 (age 44)
- Party: Democratic
- Relatives: Rodolfo "Corky" Gonzales (grandfather)
- Education: Colorado State University (BS)

Serena Lucha Gonzales-Gutierrez (born November 22, 1981) is an American politician who is a member of the Denver City Council, representing one of two at-large districts. Previously, she served in the Colorado House of Representatives, representing the 4th district in Denver from January 2019 until she resigned on August 4, 2023.

== Notable Family ==
Gonzales-Gutierrez is the granddaughter of Rodolfo "Corky" Gonzales, a notable Chicano cultural activist. She has pointed to his work as inspiring her passion for activism and politics in Denver, especially surrounding education, saying that it was the path to a better life and to freedom.

== Elections ==
=== 2018 ===
Gonzales-Gutierrez was elected in the general election on November 6, 2018, winning 82 percent of the vote over 18 percent of Republican candidate Robert John.

=== 2020 ===
Gonzales-Gutierrez ran unopposed in the Democratic primary. In the general election, she garnered 81.8% of the vote, defeating Republican nominee Grant Price.

=== 2023 ===
Gonzales-Gutierrez successfully ran for one of two at-large seats on the Denver City Council. In the election held on April 4, among nine candidates, Gonzales-Gutierrez received the most votes of any candidate, 52,486 votes, or 20.57% of the total votes cast for the two positions. Her term began in July.
