= Jesus Salas =

American labor leader and activist (born 1943)

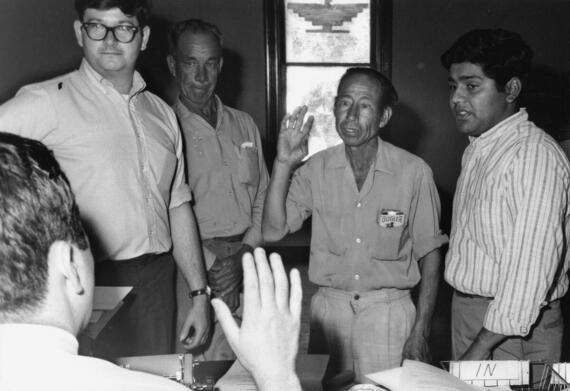
- Salas (far right) in 1967
- Born: December 25, 1943; Crystal City, Texas, U.S.
- Occupations: Labor leader; political activist; educator

Jesus Salas (born December 25, 1943) is an American labor unionist, political activist, and educator. He is best known for his involvement in the farmworkers' rights movement and for cofounding Obreros Unidos, an independent agricultural labor union he established in 1966 that advocated for the rights of Mexican American migrants in Wisconsin. Inspired by the example set by Cesar Chavez and his leadership with United Farm Workers, Salas led a march from Wautoma, Wisconsin, to Madison in support of the rights of agricultural workers. He became the first Latino CEO of United Migrant Opportunity Services (UMOS), a nonprofit advocacy organization dedicated to serving underserved communities. Salas later became an educator, teaching bilingual courses at Milwaukee Area Technical College and lecturing at the University of Wisconsin–Madison and the University of Wisconsin–Milwaukee, before being appointed to the University of Wisconsin System Board of Regents. Salas has been described "as the Cesar Chavez of Wisconsin migrant workers."

== Early life and background ==
=== Childhood ===
Jesus Salas was born on Christmas Day, 1943, in Crystal City, Texas, at the home of his paternal grandparents. A third-generation American, he is the third of six sons born to Argentina (née Rodriguez) and Manuel Salas, both born and raised in Texas. Salas' ancestors were from the Mexican state of Coahuila. Throughout his early years, he traveled with his family between Texas, the Mississippi Delta, and the Midwest following seasonal agricultural work before ultimately settling in Wautoma, Wisconsin, in 1959. During his time in the agricultural industry, he witnessed the harsh working and living conditions migrant laborers typically faced, including low wages, inadequate housing, and a lack of legal rights. These early experiences later influenced his activism in advocating for the rights of migrant workers.

After graduating from Wautoma High School in 1961, Salas enrolled at the University of Wisconsin–Oshkosh, where his brother, Manuel, was a student. Despite his and his brother's being the university's only two students of Mexican descent, Salas was involved in several student organizations. In 1964, Salas left school and briefly lived in Madison. During this period, Salas became involved in the movement that opposed U.S. involvement in the Vietnam War, including challenging the drafting of men into the military. Unable to attend the University of Wisconsin–Madison due to his grades, he eventually moved north and continued his studies at the University of Wisconsin–Stevens Point in 1966. Salas received his bachelor's degree in social work from the University of Wisconsin–Milwaukee School of Education in 1971.

== Activism ==
=== Early activism ===
Between 1961 and 1965, Salas worked summers at a day-care program serving the children of migrant families. In 1965, he began a years-long collaboration with University of Wisconsin–Madison economics professor Elizabeth Brandeis Raushenbush (a daughter of U.S. Supreme Court Justice Louis Brandeis). His first assignment was to conduct a study that collected information about migrant in the Wautoma area. With Raushenbush's involvement in addressing workers' poor working and housing conditions, Raushenbush and Salas began campaigning for various causes, including the regulation of Wisconsin's Industrial Commission code and advocating for better wages and more adequate living conditions for migrant workers. He also became involved in politics and activism, focusing primarily on the rights of migrant workers, which led him to join the National Farm Workers Association (a predecessor of the United Farm Workers labor union that was led by Cesar Chavez).

=== Obreros Unidos ===
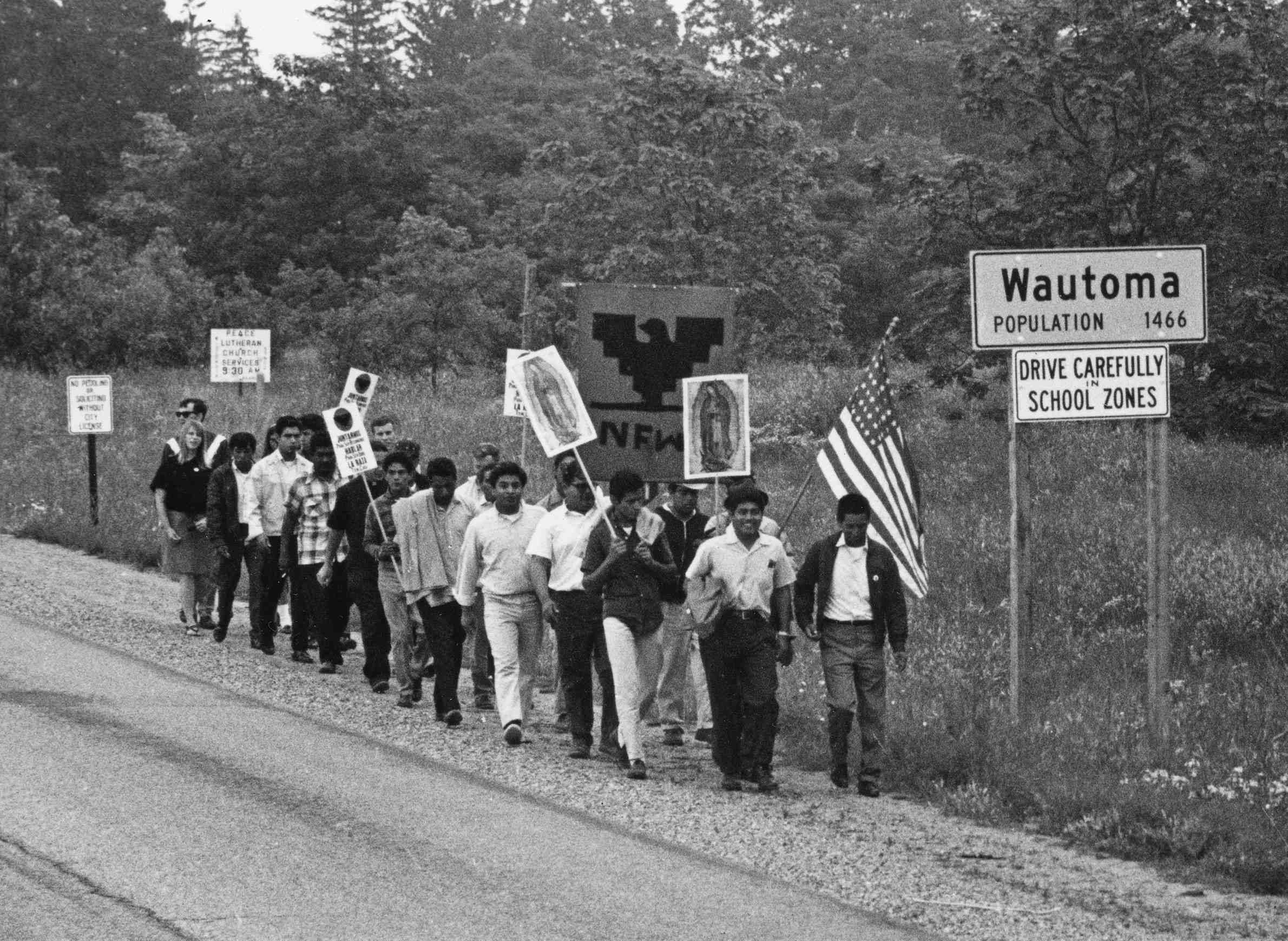
Salas (second from right) and group of marchers leaving Wautoma for Madison

On Monday, August 15, 1966, Salas and a group of fourteen migrant workers began an 80-mile "march for respectability" from Wautoma to the Wisconsin State Capitol in Madison to protest the poor working conditions faced by migrant farmworkers and demand labor protections. The purpose of the march was to call for legislative reforms and allow for migrants to voice their grievances. The demands of the workers were simple: a $1.25-an-hour minimum wage, improved housing, insurance for accidents and hospitalizations, a meeting with Governor Warren P. Knowles' Committee on Migratory Labor, and public bathrooms for farm workers in Wautoma. Along the way, some of the marchers suffered injuries from the long distance they had traveled on foot, including one case of foot infection. Nevertheless, the protestors arrived in Madison on Friday, August 19, where dozens of migrant workers and supporters were waiting. A total of 160 people arrived at the State Capitol, where about 400 people were waiting. Once they arrived, Salas spoke for an hour and spoke with representatives of Governor Knowles. The march made front-page news in several Wisconsin newspapers. Shortly after the march, Salas cofounded Obreros Unidos (Spanish for "Workers United"), an organization that sought to further advocate for the rights of migrant workers in Wisconsin.

=== Later activism ===
Throughout Obreros Unidos's time of activity, Salas continued to meet with prominent figures to discuss the rights of migrants, including Cesar Chavez and Wisconsin Attorney General Bronson La Follette. In March of 1969, Salas became the first Latino CEO of United Migrant Opportunity Services (UMOS), an organization that provided employment and social services to workers in Wisconsin. He served in this position until 1971 after promising to serve only two funding periods. Before dissolving in 1971, Obreros Unidos published a monthly bilingual newspaper, La Voz Mexicana (Spanish for "The Mexican Voice"), which it used to provide farm workers in Wisconsin with information about labor laws and to inform readers of their rights. Salas earned his master's degree in political science from the University of Wisconsin–Madison in 1985. In 2003, Governor Jim Doyle appointed Salas to the University of Wisconsin System Board of Regents, a position he held until 2007.

== Personal life ==
Salas has been married three times and has two children. During the summer of 1968, Salas met his first wife, Glorie, who was a senior at the University of Wisconsin–Madison, before having a son, who was born in San Francisco. They later married and lived in Wisconsin before divorcing. Before their divorce was finalized, Salas began a relationship with a woman named Viviana, who became pregnant with a daughter before later marrying. He later married his third wife, Imelda. Salas currently lives in Milwaukee, where he continues his involvement with Latino organizations. He is fluent in English and Spanish and frequently travels between Milwaukee and his hometown of Crystal City, Texas.

== See also ==
- Obreros Unidos
- Cesar Chavez
- Lupe Martinez
- Union organizer
