= Colorado's 4th House of Representatives district =

American legislative district

Colorado's 4th State House of Representatives district
Representative
Cecelia Espenoza; D–Denver
- Registration: 45.5% Democratic; 8.4% Republican; 44.4% No party preference
- Demographics: 51% White; 2% Black; 41% Hispanic; 1% Asian; 1% Native American; 2% Multiracial
- Population (2021): 80,993
- Registered voters: 63,622

Colorado's 4th House of Representatives district is one of 65 districts in the Colorado House of Representatives. It has been represented by Democrat Cecelia Espenoza since 2025.

== Geography ==
District 4 covers western and northwestern Denver.

The district is located entirely within Colorado's 1st congressional district and the 34th district within the Colorado Senate.

== Recent election results ==
=== 2024 ===
2024 Colorado House of Representatives election, District 4
Party	Candidate	Votes	%
Democratic	Cecelia Espenoza	32,315	78.94%
Republican	Jack Daus	8,623	21.06%
Total votes		40,938	100.00%
Democratic hold			

=== 2022 ===
2022 Colorado House of Representatives election, District 4
Party	Candidate	Votes	%
Democratic	Serena Gonzales-Gutierrez	27,116	82.66
Republican	Jack Daus	5,687	17.34
Total votes		32,803	100
Democratic hold			

=== 2020 ===
2020 Colorado House of Representatives election, District 4
Party	Candidate	Votes	%
Democratic	Serena Gonzales-Gutierrez	34,501	81.85
Republican	Grant Price	7,651	18.15
Total votes		42,152	100
Democratic hold			

=== 2018 ===
2018 Colorado House of Representatives election, District 4
Party	Candidate	Votes	%
Democratic	Serena Gonzales-Gutierrez	27,564	82.73
Republican	Robert John	5,756	17.27
Total votes		33,320	100
Democratic hold			

=== 2016 ===
2016 Colorado House of Representatives election, District 4
Party	Candidate	Votes	%
Democratic	Dan Pabon	25,224	76.90
Republican	Gavin Marie Halligan	7,577	23.10
Total votes		32,801	100
Democratic hold			

=== 2014 ===
2014 Colorado House of Representatives election, District 4
Party	Candidate	Votes	%
Democratic	Dan Pabon	18,593	78.06
Republican	David W. Dobson	5,226	21.94
Total votes		23,819	100
Democratic hold			

=== 2012 ===
2012 Colorado House of Representatives election, District 4
Party	Candidate	Votes	%
Democratic	Dan Pabon	24,860	81.02
Republican	David W. Dobson	5,823	18.98
Total votes		30,683	100
Democratic hold			

=== 2010 ===
2010 Colorado House of Representatives election, District 4
Party	Candidate	Votes	%
Democratic	Dan Pabon	13,373	74.44%
Republican	Rick D. Nevin	3,402	19.04%
Libertarian	Marc Goddard	919	5.12%
Total votes		17,964	100%
Democratic hold			
