= Policy Matters Ohio =

Nonprofit organization in Ohio

- Formation: January 2000
- Founder: Amy Hanauer
- Type: Nonprofit
- Purpose: Public policy
- Location(s): 3631 Perkins Ave., Cleveland, OH 125 E. Broad St., Columbus, OH
- Executive Director: Hannah Halbert
- Revenue: $1,465,766 (2024)
- Expenses: $1,618,897 (2024)
- Website: www.policymattersohio.org

Policy Matters Ohio is a nonprofit, progressive think tank based in Ohio. The organization focuses on a variety of issues in Ohio on labor economics, taxation, public schools, and policing.

The organization has proposed funding health and human service investments by increasing state income taxes on Ohio's upper tax brackets. It has documented the cost to communities of tax incentives given to businesses.
