= 2012 Colorado Senate election =

- November 6, 2012

20 out of 35 seats in the Colorado Senate 18 seats needed for a majority
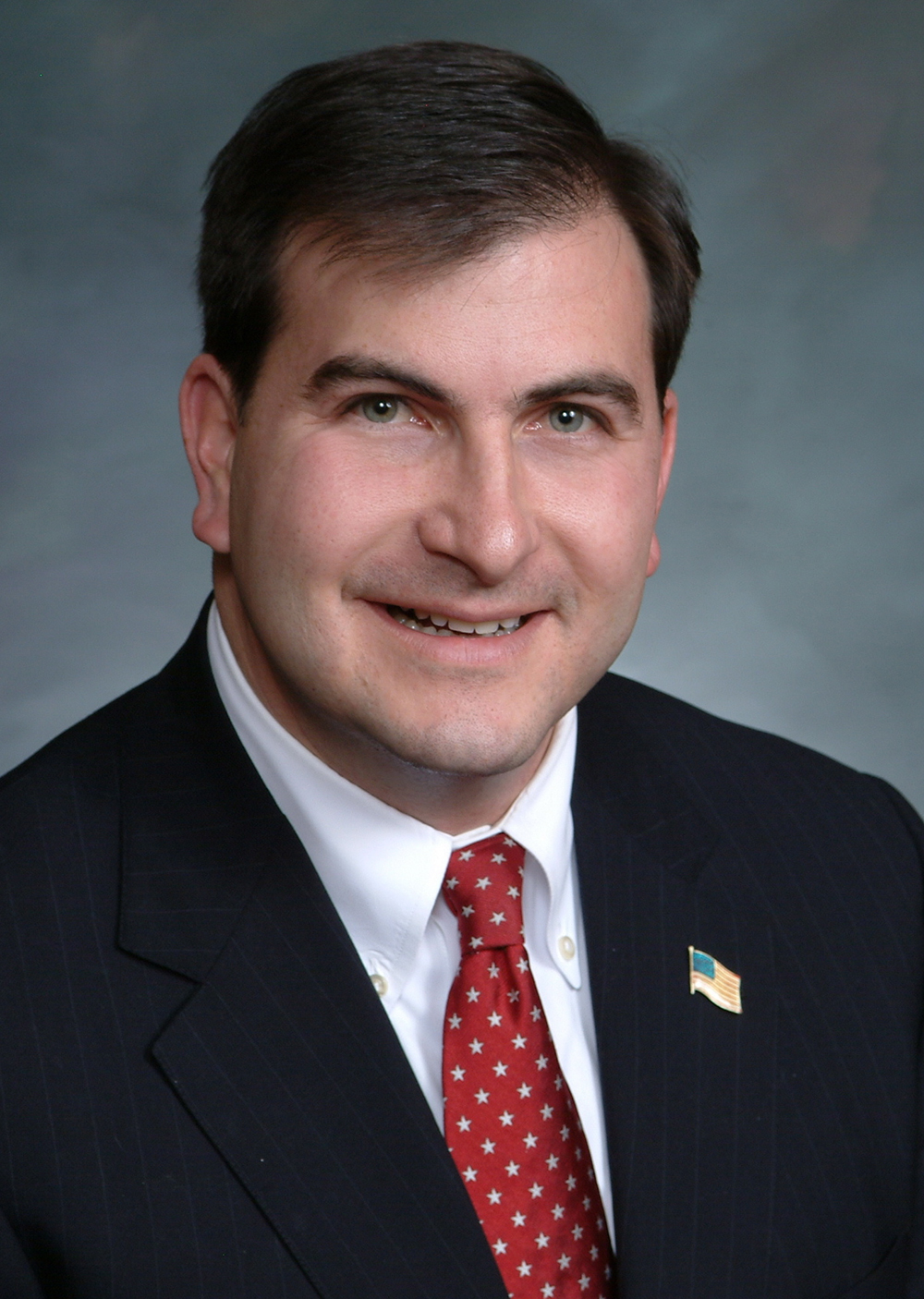

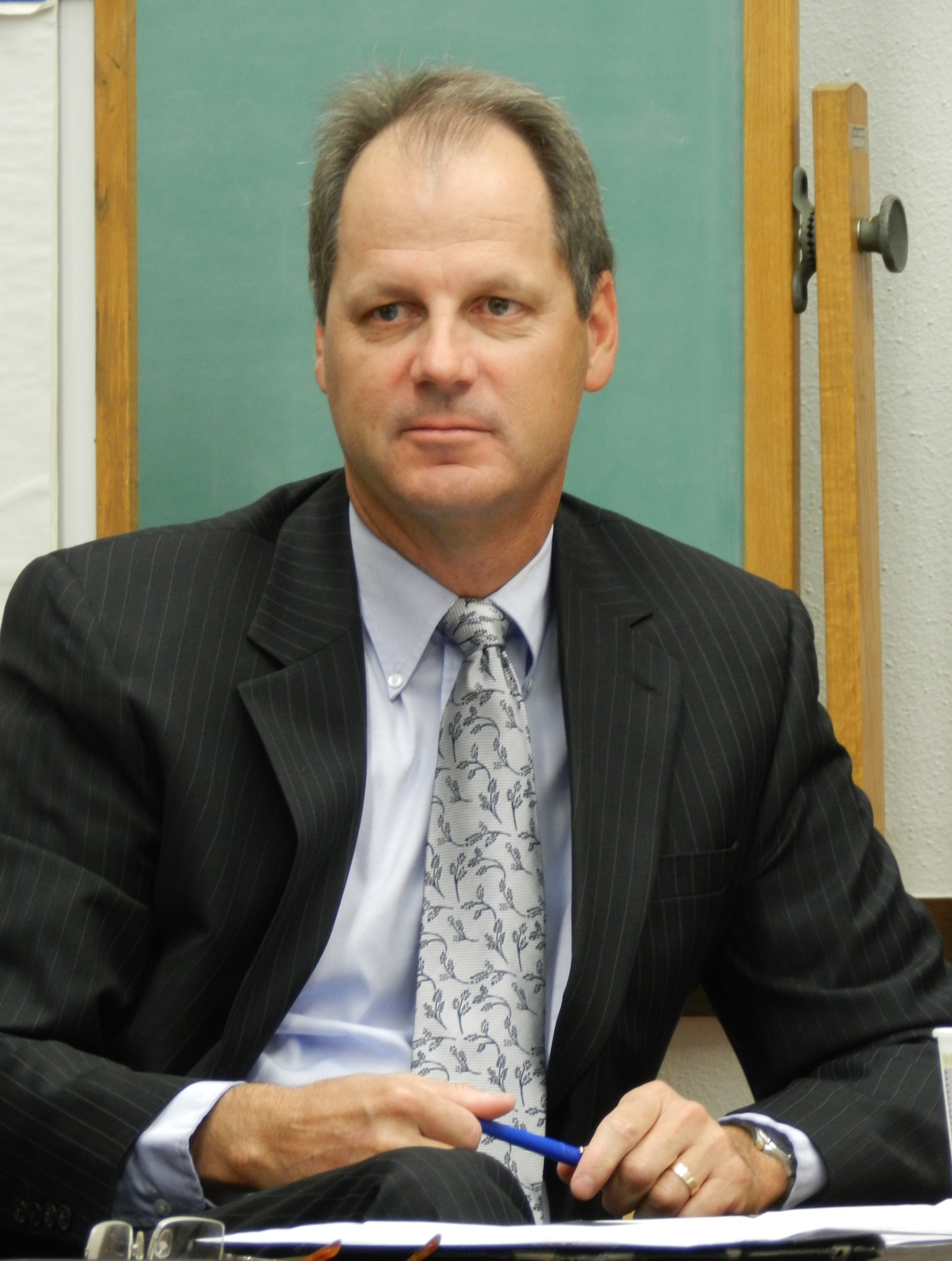
	Majority party	Minority party
Leader	Brandon Shaffer (Term-limited)	Bill Cadman (Redistricted)
Party	Democratic	Republican
Leader since	May 6, 2009	October 21, 2011
Leader's seat	District 17	District 10
Last election	20	15
Seats after	20	15
Seat change	Steady	Steady
Popular vote	714,492	587,261
Percentage	52.64%	43.27%
President before election
Brandon Shaffer
Democratic
Elected President
John Morse
Democratic

The 2012 Colorado Senate election was held on November 6, 2012, to determine which party would control the Colorado Senate for the following two years in the 69th Colorado General Assembly. Twenty out of 35 seats in the Colorado Senate were up for election and the primary was held on June 26, 2012. Prior to the election, 20 seats were held by Democrats and 15 seats were held by Republicans. This was the first election following the redistricting of Colorado's legislative seats in 2011. The general election saw neither party lose nor gain any seats, meaning that the Democrats retained their majority in the State Senate.

== Predictions ==
Source	Ranking	As of
Governing	Lean D	October 24, 2012

== Retirements ==
=== Democrats ===
1. District 14: Bob Bacon was term-limited.
2. District 17: Brandon Shaffer was term-limited.
3. District 21: Betty Boyd was term-limited.
4. District 30: Suzanne Williams was term-limited.
5. District 35: Joyce Foster retired.

=== Republicans ===
1. District 7: Shawn Mitchell was term-limited.
2. District 12: Keith King retired.
3. District 22: Tim Neville retired.
4. District 27: Nancy Spence was term-limited.

== Defeated incumbents ==
=== Primary ===
==== Republicans ====
1. District 8: Jean White lost renomination to Randy Baumgardner.

== Closest races ==
Seats where the margin of victory was under 10%:

1. District 19, 1.00%
2. District 35, 2.00% (gain)
3. District 22, 6.00% (gain)
4. District 8, 7.00%
5. District 26, 8.00%

== Results ==
=== District 4 ===
District 4 election, 2012
Party	Candidate	Votes	%
Republican	Mark Scheffel (incumbent)	50,173	64.00%
Democratic	Holly Gorman	24,968	32.00%
Libertarian	Chris Grundemann	3,437	4.00%
Total votes		78,578	100.0%
Republican hold			

=== District 8 ===
District 8 election, 2012
Party	Candidate	Votes	%
Republican	Randy Baumgardner	34,187	51.00%
Democratic	Emily Tracy	29,688	44.00%
Libertarian	Sacha L. Weis	3,079	5.00%
Total votes		66,954	100.0%
Republican hold			

=== District 10 ===
District 10 election, 2012
Party	Candidate	Votes	%
Republican	Owen Hill	44,200	73.00%
Libertarian	Brandon Hughes	10,255	17.00%
American Constitution	Christopher Mull	5,721	10.00%
Total votes		60,176	100.0%
Republican hold			

=== District 12 ===
District 12 election, 2012
Party	Candidate	Votes	%
Republican	Bill Cadman (incumbent)	34,673	68.00%
Libertarian	Dave Respecki	8,603	17.00%
American Constitution	James Michael Bristol	7,762	15.00%
Total votes		51,038	100.0%
Republican hold			

=== District 14 ===
District 14 election, 2012
Party	Candidate	Votes	%
Democratic	John Kefalas	46,673	58.00%
Republican	Syndi Anderson	28,874	36.00%
Libertarian	Jeff Johnston	3,166	4.00%
Independent	Barrett Rothe	1,828	2.00%
Total votes		80,541	100.0%
Democratic hold			

=== District 17 ===
District 17 election, 2012
Party	Candidate	Votes	%
Democratic	Matt Jones	45,426	62.00%
Republican	Charlie Plagainos	23,983	33.00%
Libertarian	Ken Bray	3,848	5.00%
Total votes		73,257	100.0%
Democratic hold			

=== District 18 ===
District 18 election, 2012
Party	Candidate	Votes	%
Democratic	Rollie Heath (incumbent)	66,619	78.00%
Republican	Barry Thoma	18,427	22.00%
Total votes		85,046	100.0%
Democratic hold			

=== District 19 ===
District 19 election, 2012
Party	Candidate	Votes	%
Democratic	Evie Hudak (incumbent)	35,664	47.00%
Republican	Lang Sias	35,080	46.00%
Libertarian	Lloyd A. Sweeny	5,104	7.00%
Total votes		75,848	100.0%
Democratic hold			

=== District 21 ===
District 21 election, 2012
Party	Candidate	Votes	%
Democratic	Jessie Ulibarri	30,308	65.00%
Republican	Francine Bigelow	16,373	35.00%
Total votes		46,681	100.0%
Democratic hold			

=== District 22 ===
District 22 election, 2012
Party	Candidate	Votes	%
Democratic	Andy Kerr	38,845	53.00%
Republican	Ken Summers	35,008	47.00%
Total votes		73,853	100.0%
Democratic gain from Republican			

=== District 23 ===
District 23 election, 2012
Party	Candidate	Votes	%
Republican	Vicki Marble	43,949	56.00%
Democratic	Lee Kemp	34,252	44.00%
Total votes		78,201	100.0%
Republican hold			

=== District 25 ===
District 25 election, 2012
Party	Candidate	Votes	%
Democratic	Mary Hodge (incumbent)	27,961	55.00%
Republican	John Sampson	20,310	40.00%
Libertarian	Ronald G. Schweizer	2,461	5.00%
Total votes		50,732	100.0%
Democratic hold			

=== District 26 ===
District 26 election, 2012
Party	Candidate	Votes	%
Democratic	Linda Newell (incumbent)	38,744	54.00%
Republican	Dave Kerber	32,890	46.00%
Total votes		71,634	100.0%
Democratic hold			

=== District 27 ===
District 27 election, 2012
Party	Candidate	Votes	%
Republican	David Balmer	42,411	55.00%
Democratic	David Paladino	34,957	45.00%
Total votes		77,368	100.0%
Republican hold			

=== District 28 ===
District 28 election, 2012
Party	Candidate	Votes	%
Democratic	Nancy Todd	37,181	58.00%
Republican	John Lyons	24,475	38.00%
Libertarian	Robert Harrison	2,459	4.00%
Total votes		64,115	100.0%
Democratic hold			

=== District 29 ===
District 29 election, 2012
Party	Candidate	Votes	%
Democratic	Morgan Carroll (incumbent)	30,149	59.00%
Republican	William Ross II	18,745	37.00%
Libertarian	Michele Rae Poague	2,420	4.00%
Total votes		51,314	100.0%
Democratic hold			

=== District 31 ===
District 31 election, 2012
Party	Candidate	Votes	%
Democratic	Pat Steadman (incumbent)	54,390	70.00%
Republican	Michael Carr	23,425	30.00%
Total votes		77,815	100.0%
Democratic hold			

=== District 32 ===
District 32 election, 2012
Party	Candidate	Votes	%
Democratic	Irene Aguilar (incumbent)	47,995	70.00%
Republican	Roger Logan	20,505	30.00%
Total votes		68,500	100.0%
Democratic hold			

=== District 33 ===
District 33 election, 2012
Party	Candidate	Votes	%
Democratic	Michael Johnston (incumbent)	51,357	82.00%
Republican	Jason DeBerry	8,456	14.00%
Libertarian	Courtney Kolva	2,579	4.00%
Total votes		62,392	100.0%
Democratic hold			

=== District 35 ===
District 35 election, 2012
Party	Candidate	Votes	%
Republican	Larry Crowder	31,117	49.00%
Democratic	Crestina Martinez	29,618	47.00%
Libertarian	William Bartley	2,461	4.00%
Total votes		63,196	100.0%
Republican gain from Democratic			
