= 2020 Colorado Senate election =

2020 Colorado State Senate election
- November 3, 2020

18 of the 35 seats in the Colorado Senate 18 seats needed for a majority
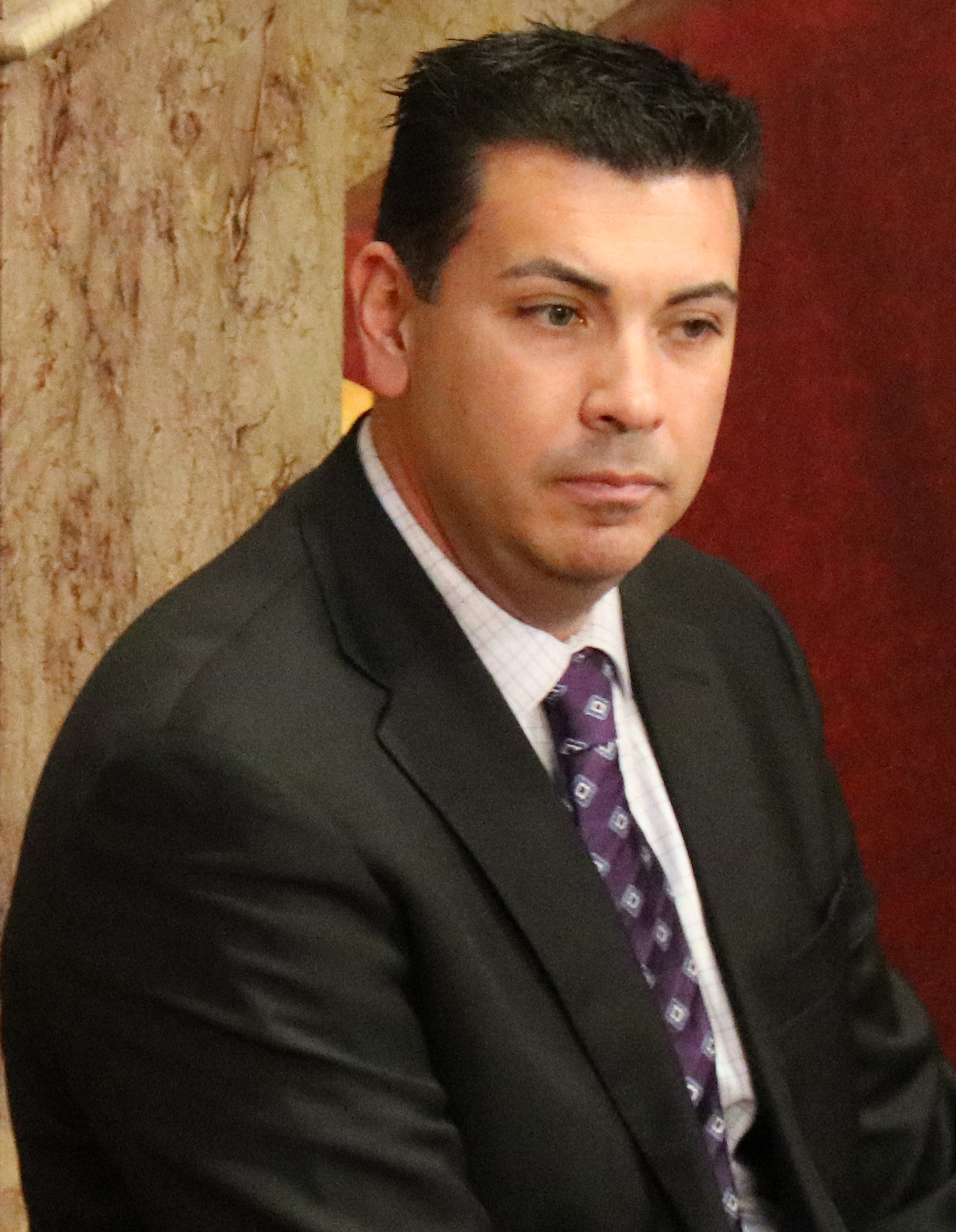

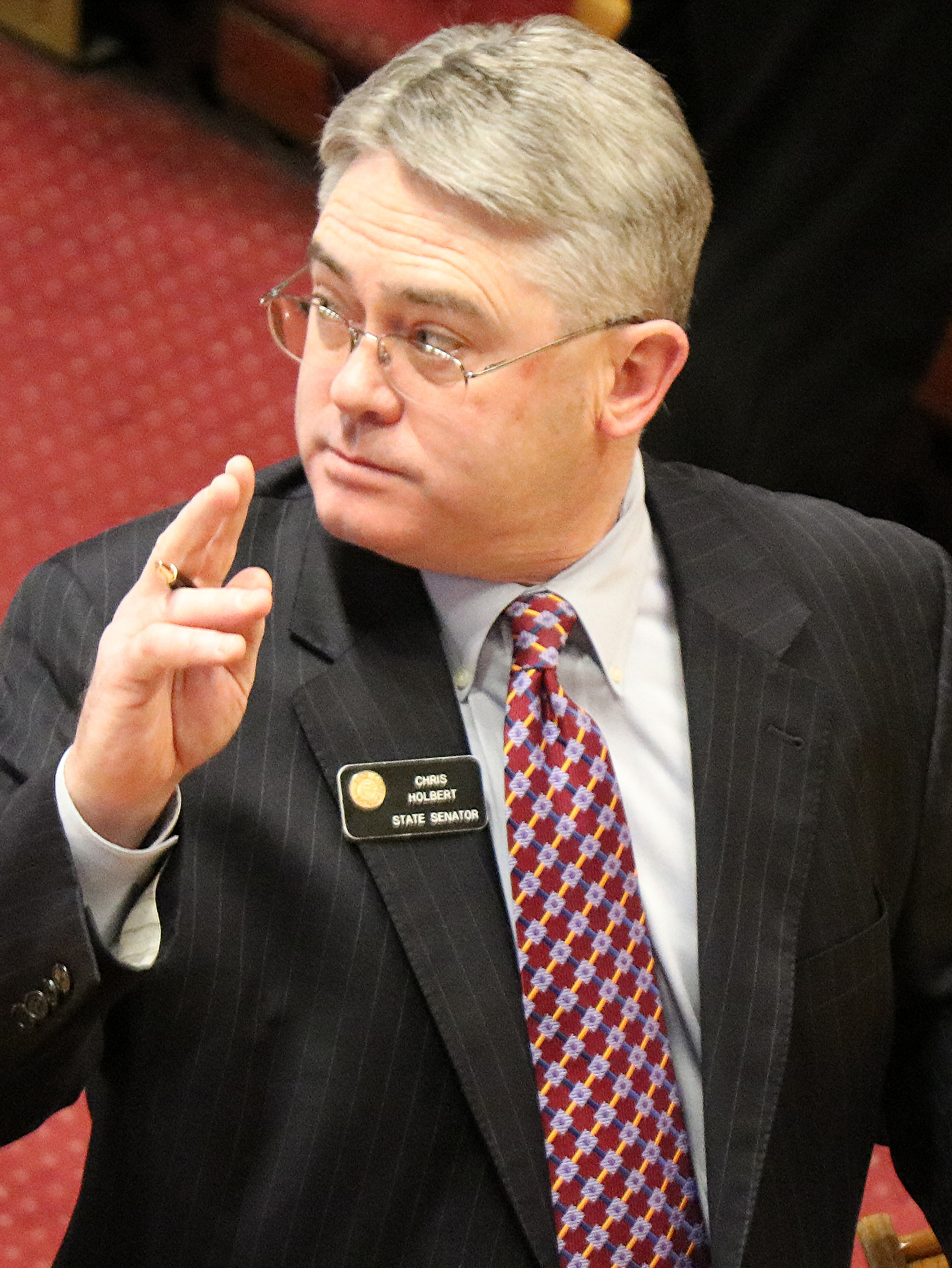
| | Majority party | Minority party |
|---|---|---|
| Leader | Leroy Garcia | Chris Holbert |
| Party | Democratic | Republican |
| Leader's seat | District 3 | District 30 |
| Seats before | 19 | 16 |
| Seats won | 20 | 15 |
| Seat change | ▲1 | ▼1 |
| Popular vote | 920,525 | 630,299 |
| Percentage | 57.81% | 39.58% |
| Seats up | 10 | 8 |
| Races won | 11 | 7 |
- Results: Democratic gain Democratic hold Republican hold No election
President of the Senate before election
Leroy Garcia
Democratic
Elected President of the Senate
Leroy Garcia
Democratic

The 2020 Colorado Senate elections took place on November 3, 2020, with the primary elections held on June 30, 2020. Voters in 18 out of 35 districts of the state senate elected their representative for a four-year term. It coincided with the state House elections and the biennial United States elections. The Democratic Party retained control of the Senate, winning 20 seats, and increased their majority by one, gaining the 27th district from the Republican Party.

== Background ==
In the previous state Senate election (2018), the Democrats claimed control of the chamber from the Republicans, gaining two Republican seats and one independent (formerly Democratic senator) seat. That resulted in a 19-seat Democratic majority. Therefore, for Democrats to have lost their absolute majority in the Senate in this election, Republicans and other parties would have needed to gain at least two more seats.

== Incumbents not seeking re-election ==
=== Term-limited incumbents ===
One Democratic and three Republican incumbents were term-limited and prohibited from seeking a consecutive third term.

- Owen Hill (R), District 10
- Vicki Marble (R), District 23
- Nancy Todd (D), District 28
- Larry Crowder (R), District 35

=== Retiring incumbents ===
- Mike Foote (D), District 17
- Jack Tate (R), District 27
- Angela Williams (D), District 33

== Predictions ==
| Source | Ranking | As of |
|---|---|---|
| The Cook Political Report | Likely D | October 21, 2020 |

== Results ==
- Districts not shown would not be up for election until 2022.

| District | Incumbent | Party | Elected | Party |
|---|---|---|---|---|
| 4 | Jim Smallwood | Rep | Jim Smallwood | Rep |
| 8 | Bob Rankin | Rep | Bob Rankin | Rep |
| 10 | Owen Hill | Rep | Larry Liston | Rep |
| 12 | Bob Gardner | Rep | Bob Gardner | Rep |
| 14 | Joann Ginal | Dem | Joann Ginal | Dem |
| 17 | Mike Foote | Dem | Sonya Jaquez Lewis | Dem |
| 18 | Steve Fenberg | Dem | Steve Fenberg | Dem |
| 19 | Rachel Zenzinger | Dem | Rachel Zenzinger | Dem |
| 21 | Dominick Moreno | Dem | Dominick Moreno | Dem |
| 23 | Vicki Marble | Rep | Barbara Kirkmeyer | Rep |
| 25 | Kevin Priola | Rep | Kevin Priola | Rep |
| 26 | Jeff Bridges | Dem | Jeff Bridges | Dem |
| 27 | Jack Tate | Rep | **Chris Kolker** | **Dem** |
| 28 | Nancy Todd | Dem | Janet Buckner | Dem |
| 29 | Rhonda Fields | Dem | Rhonda Fields | Dem |
| 31 | Chris Hansen | Dem | Chris Hansen | Dem |
| 33 | Angela Williams | Dem | James Coleman | Dem |
| 35 | Larry Crowder | Rep | Cleave Simpson Jr. | Rep |

Bold - Gain
Italics - Hold, new member

== Closest races ==
Seats where the margin of victory was under 10%:

1. District 8, 1.16%
2. District 25, 1.68%

== Detailed results ==
=== District 4 ===
4th District Democratic primary
| Party | Candidate | Votes | % |
|---|---|---|---|
| Democratic | Elissa Flaumenhaft | 19,997 | 100.0 |
| Total votes | | 19,997 | 100.0 |

4th District Republican primary
| Party | Candidate | Votes | % |
|---|---|---|---|
| Republican | Jim Smallwood (incumbent) | 26,061 | 100.0 |
| Total votes | | 26,061 | 100.0 |

2020 Colorado Senate election, 4th District
| Party | Candidate | Votes | % |
|---|---|---|---|
| Republican | Jim Smallwood (incumbent) | 73,832 | 62.27 |
| Democratic | Elissa Flaumenhaft | 41,526 | 35.02 |
| Libertarian | Wayne Harlos | 3,208 | 2.71 |
| Total votes | | 118,566 | 100.0 |
| Republican hold | | | |

=== District 8 ===
8th District Democratic primary
| Party | Candidate | Votes | % |
|---|---|---|---|
| Democratic | Karl Hanlon | 10,847 | 55.82 |
| Democratic | Arn Menconi | 8,584 | 44.18 |
| Total votes | | 19,431 | 100.0 |

8th District Republican primary
| Party | Candidate | Votes | % |
|---|---|---|---|
| Republican | Bob Rankin (incumbent) | 11,805 | 63.20 |
| Republican | Debra Irvine | 6,873 | 36.80 |
| Total votes | | 18,678 | 100.0 |

2020 Colorado Senate election, 8th District
| Party | Candidate | Votes | % |
|---|---|---|---|
| Republican | Bob Rankin (incumbent) | 42,701 | 50.58 |
| Democratic | Karl Hanlon | 41,717 | 49.42 |
| Total votes | | 84,418 | 100.0 |
| Republican hold | | | |

=== District 10 ===
10th District Democratic primary
| Party | Candidate | Votes | % |
|---|---|---|---|
| Democratic | Randi McCallian | 14,822 | 100.0 |
| Total votes | | 14,822 | 100.0 |

10th District Republican primary
| Party | Candidate | Votes | % |
|---|---|---|---|
| Republican | Larry Liston | 20,258 | 100.0 |
| Total votes | | 20,258 | 100.0 |

2020 Colorado Senate election, 10th District
| Party | Candidate | Votes | % |
|---|---|---|---|
| Republican | Larry Liston | 47,463 | 56.37 |
| Democratic | Randi McCallian | 32,114 | 38.14 |
| Libertarian | Heather Johnson | 4,620 | 5.49 |
| Total votes | | 84,197 | 100.0 |
| Republican hold | | | |

=== District 12 ===
12th District Democratic primary
| Party | Candidate | Votes | % |
|---|---|---|---|
| Democratic | Electra Johnson | 13,355 | 100.0 |
| Total votes | | 13,355 | 100.0 |

12th District Republican primary
| Party | Candidate | Votes | % |
|---|---|---|---|
| Republican | Bob Gardner (incumbent) | 17,947 | 100.0 |
| Total votes | | 17,947 | 100.0 |

2020 Colorado Senate election, 12th District
| Party | Candidate | Votes | % |
|---|---|---|---|
| Republican | Bob Gardner (incumbent) | 45,808 | 58.35 |
| Democratic | Electra Johnson | 29,656 | 37.77 |
| Libertarian | Zechariah L. Harris | 3,048 | 3.88 |
| Total votes | | 78,512 | 100.0 |
| Republican hold | | | |

=== District 14 ===
14th District Democratic primary
| Party | Candidate | Votes | % |
|---|---|---|---|
| Democratic | Joann Ginal (incumbent) | 29,452 | 100.0 |
| Total votes | | 29,452 | 100.0 |

14th District Republican primary
| Party | Candidate | Votes | % |
|---|---|---|---|
| Republican | Hans D. Hochheimer | 10,555 | 100.0 |
| Total votes | | 10,555 | 100.0 |

2020 Colorado Senate election, 14th District
| Party | Candidate | Votes | % |
|---|---|---|---|
| Democratic | Joann Ginal (incumbent) | 63,409 | 66.65 |
| Republican | Hans D. Hochheimer | 31,724 | 33.35 |
| Total votes | | 95,133 | 100.0 |
| Democratic hold | | | |

=== District 17 ===
17th District Democratic primary
| Party | Candidate | Votes | % |
|---|---|---|---|
| Democratic | Sonya Jaquez Lewis | 36,163 | 100.0 |
| Total votes | | 36,163 | 100.0 |

17th District Republican primary
| Party | Candidate | Votes | % |
|---|---|---|---|
| Republican | Matthew D. Menza | 10,009 | 100.0 |
| Total votes | | 10,009 | 100.0 |

17th District general election, 2020
| Party | Candidate | Votes | % |
|---|---|---|---|
| Democratic | Sonya Jaquez Lewis | 65,226 | 67.89 |
| Republican | Matthew D. Menza | 30,848 | 32.11 |
| Total votes | | 96,074 | 100.0 |
| Democratic hold | | | |

=== District 18 ===
18th District Democratic primary
| Party | Candidate | Votes | % |
|---|---|---|---|
| Democratic | Steve Fenberg (incumbent) | 40,036 | 100.0 |
| Total votes | | 40,036 | 100.0 |

18th District Republican primary
| Party | Candidate | Votes | % |
|---|---|---|---|
| Republican | Peg Cage | 4,673 | 100.0 |
| Total votes | | 4,673 | 100.0 |

2020 Colorado Senate election, 18th District
| Party | Candidate | Votes | % |
|---|---|---|---|
| Democratic | Steve Fenberg (incumbent) | 75,261 | 82.90 |
| Republican | Peg Cage | 15,524 | 17.10 |
| Total votes | | 90,785 | 100.0 |
| Democratic hold | | | |

=== District 19 ===
19th District Democratic primary
| Party | Candidate | Votes | % |
|---|---|---|---|
| Democratic | Rachel Zenzinger (incumbent) | 27,598 | 100.0 |
| Total votes | | 27,598 | 100.0 |

19th District Republican primary
| Party | Candidate | Votes | % |
|---|---|---|---|
| Republican | Lynn Gerber | 13,926 | 100.0 |
| Total votes | | 13,926 | 100.0 |

2020 Colorado Senate election, 19th District
| Party | Candidate | Votes | % |
|---|---|---|---|
| Democratic | Rachel Zenzinger (incumbent) | 54,694 | 59.17 |
| Republican | Lynn Gerber | 37,740 | 40.83 |
| Total votes | | 92,434 | 100.0 |
| Democratic hold | | | |

=== District 21 ===
21st District Democratic primary
| Party | Candidate | Votes | % |
|---|---|---|---|
| Democratic | Dominick Moreno (incumbent) | 16,154 | 100.0 |
| Total votes | | 16,154 | 100.0 |

21st District Republican primary
| Party | Candidate | Votes | % |
|---|---|---|---|
| Republican | Martín Mendez | 6,320 | 100.0 |
| Total votes | | 6,320 | 100.0 |

2020 Colorado Senate election, 21st District
| Party | Candidate | Votes | % |
|---|---|---|---|
| Democratic | Dominick Moreno (incumbent) | 41,438 | 63.55 |
| Republican | Martín Mendez | 23,769 | 36.45 |
| Total votes | | 65,207 | 100.0 |
| Democratic hold | | | |

=== District 23 ===
23rd District Democratic primary
| Party | Candidate | Votes | % |
|---|---|---|---|
| Democratic | Sally Boccella | 16,649 | 55.60 |
| Democratic | Galina Nicoll | 13,295 | 44.40 |
| Total votes | | 29,944 | 100.0 |

23rd District Republican primary
| Party | Candidate | Votes | % |
|---|---|---|---|
| Republican | Barbara Kirkmeyer | 15,209 | 55.24 |
| Republican | Rupert Parchment | 12,326 | 44.76 |
| Total votes | | 27,535 | 100.0 |

2020 Colorado Senate election, 23rd District
| Party | Candidate | Votes | % |
|---|---|---|---|
| Republican | Barbara Kirkmeyer | 71,570 | 55.14 |
| Democratic | Sally Boccella | 58,227 | 44.86 |
| Total votes | | 129,797 | 100.0 |
| Republican hold | | | |

=== District 25 ===
25th District Democratic primary
| Party | Candidate | Votes | % |
|---|---|---|---|
| Democratic | Paula Dickerson | 15,477 | 100.0 |
| Total votes | | 15,477 | 100.0 |

25th District Republican primary
| Party | Candidate | Votes | % |
|---|---|---|---|
| Republican | Kevin Priola (incumbent) | 11,135 | 100.0 |
| Total votes | | 11,135 | 100.0 |

2020 Colorado Senate election, 25th District
| Party | Candidate | Votes | % |
|---|---|---|---|
| Republican | Kevin Priola (incumbent) | 37,195 | 50.84 |
| Democratic | Paula Dickerson | 35,968 | 49.16 |
| Total votes | | 73,163 | 100.0 |
| Republican hold | | | |

=== District 26 ===
26th District Democratic primary
| Party | Candidate | Votes | % |
|---|---|---|---|
| Democratic | Jeff Bridges (incumbent) | 27,578 | 100.0 |
| Total votes | | 27,578 | 100.0 |

26th District Republican primary
| Party | Candidate | Votes | % |
|---|---|---|---|
| Republican | Bob Roth | 12,142 | 100.0 |
| Total votes | | 12,142 | 100.0 |

2020 Colorado Senate election, 26th District
| Party | Candidate | Votes | % |
|---|---|---|---|
| Democratic | Jeff Bridges (incumbent) | 54,275 | 60.56 |
| Republican | Bob Roth | 32,984 | 36.80 |
| Libertarian | Marc Solomon | 2,366 | 2.64 |
| Total votes | | 89,625 | 100.0 |
| Democratic hold | | | |

=== District 27 ===
27th District Democratic primary
| Party | Candidate | Votes | % |
|---|---|---|---|
| Democratic | Chris Kolker | 26,173 | 100.0 |
| Total votes | | 26,173 | 100.0 |

27th District Republican primary
| Party | Candidate | Votes | % |
|---|---|---|---|
| Republican | Suzanne Staiert | 14,638 | 100.0 |
| Total votes | | 14,638 | 100.0 |

2020 Colorado Senate election, 27th District
| Party | Candidate | Votes | % |
|---|---|---|---|
| Democratic | Chris Kolker | 51,005 | 55.30 |
| Republican | Suzanne Staiert | 41,222 | 44.70 |
| Total votes | | 92,227 | 100.0 |
| Democratic gain from Republican | | | |

=== District 28 ===
28th District Democratic primary
| Party | Candidate | Votes | % |
|---|---|---|---|
| Democratic | Janet Buckner | 24,483 | 100.0 |
| Total votes | | 24,483 | 100.0 |

28th District Republican primary
| Party | Candidate | Votes | % |
|---|---|---|---|
| Republican | Karl Stecher | 11,157 | 100.0 |
| Total votes | | 11,157 | 100.0 |

2020 Colorado Senate election, 28th District
| Party | Candidate | Votes | % |
|---|---|---|---|
| Democratic | Janet Buckner | 51,028 | 61.92 |
| Republican | Karl Stecher | 31,387 | 38.08 |
| Total votes | | 82,415 | 100.0 |
| Democratic hold | | | |

=== District 29 ===
29th District Democratic primary
| Party | Candidate | Votes | % |
|---|---|---|---|
| Democratic | Rhonda Fields (incumbent) | 20,226 | 100.0 |
| Total votes | | 20,226 | 100.0 |

2020 Colorado Senate election, 29th District
| Party | Candidate | Votes | % |
|---|---|---|---|
| Democratic | Rhonda Fields (incumbent) | 45,828 | 68.66 |
| Libertarian | Michele Poague | 20,914 | 31.34 |
| Total votes | | 66,742 | 100.0 |
| Democratic hold | | | |

=== District 31 ===
31st District Democratic primary
| Party | Candidate | Votes | % |
|---|---|---|---|
| Democratic | Chris Hansen (incumbent) | 24,439 | 52.72 |
| Democratic | Maria E. Orms | 21,916 | 47.28 |
| Total votes | | 46,355 | 100.0 |

31st District Republican primary
| Party | Candidate | Votes | % |
|---|---|---|---|
| Republican | Doug Townsend | 6,762 | 100.0 |
| Total votes | | 6,762 | 100.0 |

2020 Colorado Senate election, 31st District
| Party | Candidate | Votes | % |
|---|---|---|---|
| Democratic | Chris Hansen (incumbent) | 74,288 | 76.70 |
| Republican | Doug Townsend | 22,562 | 23.30 |
| Total votes | | 96,850 | 100.0 |
| Democratic hold | | | |

=== District 33 ===
33rd District Democratic primary
| Party | Candidate | Votes | % |
|---|---|---|---|
| Democratic | James Coleman | 40,537 | 100.0 |
| Total votes | | 40,537 | 100.0 |

2020 Colorado Senate election, 33rd District
| Party | Candidate | Votes | % |
|---|---|---|---|
| Democratic | James Coleman | 75,702 | 91.01 |
| Unity | Jerry Burton | 7,482 | 8.99 |
| Total votes | | 83,184 | 100.0 |
| Democratic hold | | | |

=== District 35 ===
35th District Democratic primary
| Party | Candidate | Votes | % |
|---|---|---|---|
| Democratic | Carlos R. Lopez | 15,609 | 100.0 |
| Total votes | | 15,609 | 100.0 |

35th District Republican primary
| Party | Candidate | Votes | % |
|---|---|---|---|
| Republican | Cleave Simpson | 17,504 | 100.0 |
| Total votes | | 17,504 | 100.0 |

2020 Colorado Senate election, 35th District
| Party | Candidate | Votes | % |
|---|---|---|---|
| Republican | Cleave Simpson | 43,970 | 60.12 |
| Democratic | Carlos R. Lopez | 29,163 | 39.88 |
| Total votes | | 73,133 | 100.0 |
| Republican hold | | | |
