= Paul Weissmann =

American politician

Member of the Colorado House of Representatives from the 12th district
- In office January 8, 2003 – January 12, 2011
- Preceded by: William Swenson
- Succeeded by: Matt Jones

Member of the Colorado Senate from the 17th district
- In office January 13, 1993 – January 8, 1997
- Preceded by: Sandy Hume
- Succeeded by: Terry Phillips

Personal details
- Born: June 9, 1964 (age 62) Denver, Colorado
- Party: Democratic

Paul Weissmann (born June 9, 1964) is an American politician who served in the Colorado Senate from the 17th district from 1993 to 1997 and in the Colorado House of Representatives from the 12th district from 2003 to 2011.
