= David Skaggs =

American politician (born 1943)

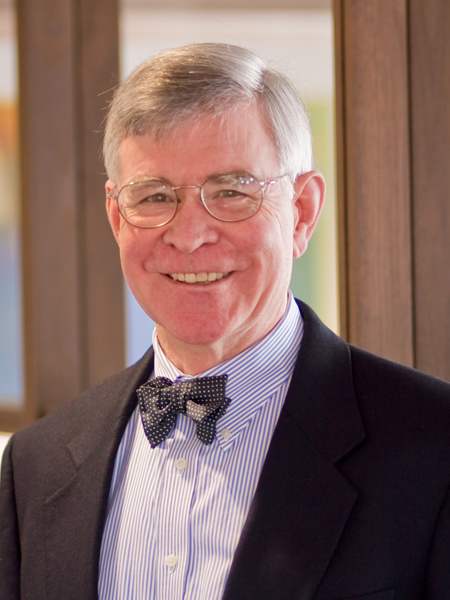

Board Chair of the Office of Congressional Ethics
- In office 2019–2021
- Preceded by: Judy Biggert (acting)
- Succeeded by: Michael D. Barnes
- In office 2008–2011
- Preceded by: Position established
- Succeeded by: Porter Goss

Board Co-Chair of the Office of Congressional Ethics
- In office 2011–2019
- Preceded by: Porter Goss
- Succeeded by: Allison Hayward

Executive Director of the Colorado Department of Higher Education
- In office January 2007 – September 2009
- Governor: Bill Ritter
- Preceded by: Richard O'Donnell
- Succeeded by: Rico Munn

Member of the U.S. House of Representatives from Colorado's 2nd district
- In office January 3, 1987 – January 3, 1999
- Preceded by: Tim Wirth
- Succeeded by: Mark Udall

Member of the Colorado House of Representatives
- In office January 7, 1981 – January 3, 1987
- Preceded by: Lee Jones
- Succeeded by: Dorothy Rupert
- Constituency: 47th district (1981–1983); 14th district (1983–1987)

Personal details
- Born: David Evans Skaggs; February 22, 1943 (age 83) Cincinnati, Ohio, U.S.
- Party: Democratic
- Spouse: Laura Locher
- Children: 3
- Education: Wesleyan University (BA); Yale University (LLB)

Military service
- Branch/service: United States Marine Corps
- Years of service: 1968–1971 (active); 1971–1979 (reserve)
- Rank: Major
- Unit: Marine Corps Judge Advocate Division

David Evans Skaggs (born February 22, 1943) is an American lawyer and politician from Colorado. A member of the Democratic Party, he served in the United States House of Representatives from 1987 to 1999.

== Early life and education ==
Skaggs was born in Cincinnati, Ohio, but grew up in the New Jersey suburbs of New York City. He earned a Bachelor of Arts degree in philosophy from Wesleyan University in 1964 and a Bachelor of Laws from Yale University in 1967.

== Career ==
=== Early career ===
Skaggs spent three years on active duty in the United States Marine Corps, including service in Vietnam with the 1st Marine Division and assignments on Okinawa and at Marine Corps Headquarters in Washington, DC. Upon discharge from active duty in 1971, he remained in the Marine Reserves until 1978, attaining the rank of Major. Skaggs practiced law briefly in New York City and, after military service, in Boulder, Colorado.

Skaggs first became involved in politics as a Democratic Party volunteer and officer in 1971. In 1974, he was hired as an aide to United States Representative Tim Wirth of Colorado, a position he held until 1977.

=== U.S. House of Representatives ===
He ran successfully for a seat in the Colorado House of Representatives in 1980, and he served three terms—two as Minority Leader—before running for Congress. Skaggs was a six-term member of the United States House of Representatives and was a delegate to the Democratic National Convention in 1984, 1988, 1992 and 1996.

While in the House, he served initially on the Science, Space & Technology Committee and the Public Works & Transportation Committee, before winning a seat on the Appropriations Committee in 1991. He also served six years (1993–99) on the House Permanent Select Committee on Intelligence. During his tenure in office, Skaggs became a voice for civility in politics. He and Representative Ray LaHood were founding co-chairs of the House Bi-Partisan Retreat, first held in 1997 and designed to encourage civility and comity in the House; the retreats continued through 2003. He was also co-founder of the Constitutional Forum (with Representative Jim Leach), a series of seminars with distinguished guest lecturers who led member discussions of constitutional issues. During the 104th Congress, Skaggs was Chairman of the Democratic Study Group, the principal policy and reform organization of House Democrats.

Notwithstanding his efforts to uphold civility and restore bipartisan comity to the House, Skaggs was often criticized for being partisan and voting along party lines. Though he was well known for his liberal voting record, he was a strong opponent both of the presidential line-item veto, once suing to block it, and President Clinton's use of military force without congressional approval. In 1992, Skaggs came under fire for his overdrafts from the so-called House bank.

=== After Congress ===
After retiring in 1999, Skaggs served as an adjunct professor at the University of Colorado and as executive director of the Center for Democracy & Citizenship at the Council for Excellence in Government for several years before moving back to Colorado to serve as executive director of the state Department of Higher Education from 2007 until resigning in 2009. His resignation raised eyebrows at the time, as no specific resignation reason was given; Skaggs merely cited a dispute with Gov. Bill Ritter. Skaggs was appointed the first chair of the board of the new Office of Congressional Ethics (OCE) in 2008. After control of the House changed to the Republicans in 2010, former Florida Representative and CIA Director Porter Goss became OCE board chair, with Skaggs as co-chair.

Additionally, Skaggs was a member of the U. S. Public Interest Declassification Board from 2005 to 2016. Skaggs also served as co-chair of the Constitution Project's bipartisan War Powers Committee. He serves on the boards of trustees of the National Endowment for Democracy and the American University of Iraq. He received the 2017 Distinguished Service Award from the U.S. Association of Former Members of Congress.

The National Oceanic and Atmospheric Administration's David E. Skaggs Research Center in Boulder, Colorado, for which he secured funding, is named in his honor. He now is affiliated with the Denver office of Dentons, where he works as a senior strategic advisor and independent consultant. He leads the legal team in a federal lawsuit challenging the constitutionality of Colorado's so-called Taxpayer Bill of Rights ("TABOR").

In January 2023, Skaggs was one of several applicants to fill the Colorado House District 12 seat vacated by the resignation of Rep. Tracey Bernett. The committee elected Louisville councilman Kyle Brown for the seat.

Skaggs endorsed an uncommitted vote in the 2024 Colorado Democratic presidential primary. In a column for The Denver Post, he praised Joe Biden's presidency but expressed doubt over his odds at re-election, and wrote that "he should step aside, as Lyndon Johnson did in March 1968 [...] preserve the splendid legacy he has earned, and avoid the embarrassment he doesn't deserve".

In July 2024, after Joe Biden's poorly received performance in the first presidential debate on June 27, and subsequent calls for him to suspend his campaign, Skaggs organized 24 former members of Congress to sign a letter asking Biden to drop out of the race.

== Personal life ==
As of 2024, Skaggs lives in Longmont, Colorado.

U.S. House of Representatives
Preceded by Tim Wirth	Member of the U.S. House of Representatives from Colorado's 2nd congressional district 1987–1999	Succeeded by Mark Udall
U.S. order of precedence (ceremonial)
Preceded by Jim Slattery as Former U.S. Representative	Order of precedence of the United States as Former U.S. Representative	Succeeded by Scott McInnis as Former U.S. Representative
