= Rod Pelton =

American politician

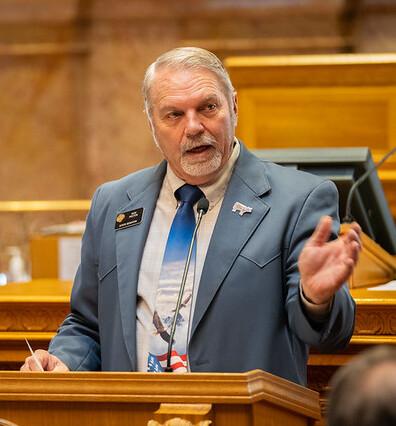
- Pelton in 2025

Member of the Colorado Senate from the 35th district
- Incumbent
- Assumed office January 9, 2023
- Preceded by: Cleave Simpson

Minority Leader of the Colorado House of Representatives
- In office November 15, 2022 – January 9, 2023
- Preceded by: Hugh McKean
- Succeeded by: Mike Lynch

Member of the Colorado House of Representatives from the 65th district
- In office January 4, 2019 – January 9, 2023
- Preceded by: Jon Becker
- Succeeded by: Redistricted

Personal details
- Party: Republican
- Website: Campaign website

Rodney Pelton is a state senator from Cheyenne Wells, Colorado. A Republican, Pelton represents Senate District 35, which includes much of east-central and southeastern Colorado.

Previously, Pelton represented Colorado House of Representatives District 65, which encompassed Morgan, Logan, Yuma, Kit Carson, Phillips, Sedgwick, and Cheyenne counties.

== Background ==
A farmer and rancher, Pelton served for many years on the Cheyenne County Board of County Commissioners, serving as chair of the commission for most of that time.

== Elections ==
=== 2018 ===
Pelton was first elected as a state representative in the 2018 general elections. In that election, he defeated his Democratic Party opponent, winning 76.3% of the vote.

=== 2020 ===
Pelton ran unopposed in the 2020 state house district 65 race, winning all 31,857 votes cast.

=== 2022 ===
In October 2021, Pelton announced his candidacy for a seat in the Colorado Senate. Specifically, he ran to represent the newly reapportioned Senate District 35, which includes parts of former districts 1 and 35 in east central and southeastern Colorado. His candidacy was successful. In the general election, he defeated his Democratic Party opponent, winning 74.30% of the vote.

Colorado House of Representatives
Preceded by Hugh McKean	Minority Leader of the Colorado House of Representatives; 2022–2023	Succeeded by Mike Lynch
