= DSRC (disambiguation) =

DSRC is dedicated short-range communications, a short to medium range wireless protocol.

DSRC may also refer to:

- Dakota Southern Railway (reporting mark), a US railroad
- David Skaggs Research Center, a research center in Colorado, US
- DoD Supercomputing Resource Centers (DSRCs), part of the US DoD High Performance Computing Modernization Program
- Daniel Smiley Research Center, a conservation science unit in New York state, US
- DsrC, a protein in dissimilatory sulfate reduction
