= Kenneth Gordon =

Kenneth or Ken Gordon may refer to:

- Ken Gordon (Trinidad and Tobago politician) (born 1930), Trinidadian businessman and politician
- Ken Gordon (Massachusetts politician) (born 1959), American attorney and state legislator
- Ken Gordon (Colorado politician) (1950–2013), American lawyer and politician
- Kenneth Gordon (cricketer) (1887–1951), South African cricketer
