= 2006 Colorado Secretary of State election =

- November 7, 2006
- Turnout: 62.6%
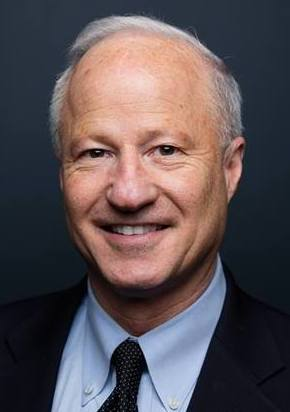

Nominee	Mike Coffman	Ken Gordon
Party	Republican	Democratic
Popular vote	772,403	748,532
Percentage	50.78%	49.22%
- County results Coffman: 50–60% 60–70% 70–80% Gordon: 50–60% 60–70% 70–80%
Secretary of State before election
Gigi Dennis
Republican
Elected Secretary of State
Mike Coffman
Republican

The 2006 Colorado Secretary of State election was held as a part of the 2006 general election on November 7, 2006. Republican nominee Mike Coffman, the then Treasurer of Colorado, defeated Democratic nominee and state Representative Ken Gordon by a 1.56% margin.

== Republican primary ==
=== Candidates ===
- Mike Coffman, Treasurer of Colorado (1999–2005; 2006–2007)

=== Results ===
Republican primary results
Party	Candidate	Votes	%
Republican	Mike Coffman	200,898	100.00%
Total votes		200,898	100.00%

== Democratic primary ==
=== Canidates ===
- Ken Gordon, state Representative for the 6th district

=== Results ===
Democratic primary results
Party	Candidate	Votes	%
Democratic	Ken Gordon	134,799	100.00%
Total votes		134,799	100.00%

== General election ==
=== Candidates ===
- Mike Coffman, Treasurer of Colorado (1999–2005; 2006–2007)
- Ken Gordon, state Representative for the 6th district

=== Results ===
2006 Colorado Secretary of State election results
Party	Candidate	Votes	%	±%
Republican	Mike Coffman	772,403	50.78%	−7.38%
Democratic	Ken Gordon	748,532	49.22%	+11.4%
Total votes		1,520,935	100.00%	
Republican hold				
