= Tracey Bernett =

American politician

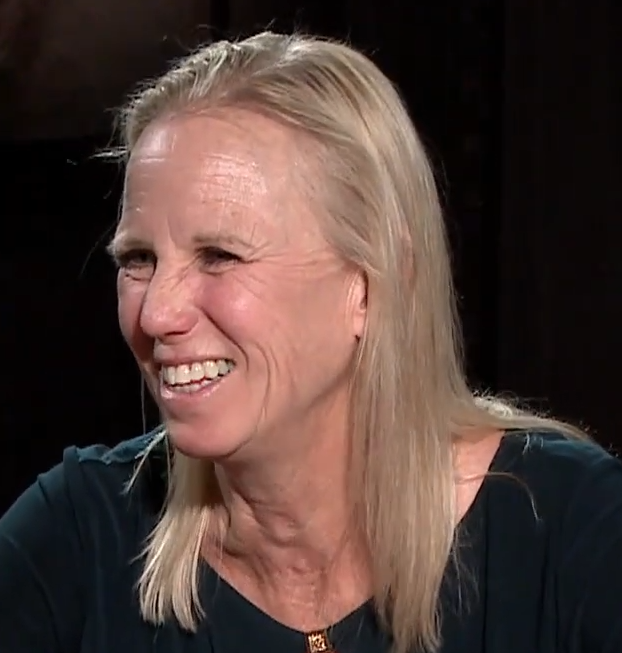
- Bernett in 2022

Member of the Colorado House of Representatives from the 12th district
- In office January 13, 2021 – January 9, 2023
- Preceded by: Sonya Jaquez Lewis
- Succeeded by: Kyle Brown

Personal details
- Born: Tracey Thayer
- Party: Democratic
- Spouse: Frank Bernett
- Children: 2
- Education: Cornell University (BS); Harvard University (MBA)

Tracey Thayer Bernett is an American politician who served as a member of the Colorado House of Representatives from the 12th district. Elected in November 2020, she assumed office on January 13, 2021.

On January 9, 2023 she resigned due to rising legal issues related to her declared place of residence. She later pled guilty to influencing a public servant and perjury.

== Education ==
Bernett earned a Bachelor of Science degree in civil engineering from Cornell University and a Master of Business Administration from Harvard Business School.

== Career ==
From 1993 to 2008, Bernett operated her own business in the computer storage industry. She also worked as a civil engineer and served as a policy analyst for Faith Winter and Mike Foote. In the November 2020 election for a seat in the Colorado House of Representatives, Bernett defeated Republican nominee Eric Davila. She assumed office on January 13, 2021.

== 2022 fraud charges ==
On November 4, 2022, Boulder County District Attorney (DA) Michael Dougherty filed three felony and two misdemeanor fraud charges against Bernett claiming she lied about residing in an apartment she rented for residency purposes. Following 2020 redistricting, Bernett's Longmont residence moved from house district 12 to district 19. The DA says Bernett then rented an apartment in Louisville which remained in district 12. The charges allege that she transferred her residence and voter registration to the apartment and filed false sworn statements with the office of the Secretary of State affirming that she resided in the apartment, even though she never really lived there. The district attorney is also charging her with misrepresenting her residence by voting in a primary election in a district she did not live in.

Bennett resigned from the Colorado General Assembly on the eve of the beginning of the 2023 legislation session.

On February 10, 2023, as part of a plea deal, Bernett pleaded guilty to a class-four felony, attempt to influence a public servant and a class-one misdemeanor, perjury. Three other charges — two felonies and one misdemeanor — were dismissed as part of the deal. Bernett received a two-year deferred judgement and sentence for the felony, which includes 150 hours of community service. The court will not enter the felony charge if she successfully completes the deferred judgment and sentence, but the misdemeanor will remain on her record.

== Personal life ==
Bernett and her husband, Frank Bernett, have two children and live in Longmont, Colorado.
