= Lori Saine =

American politician

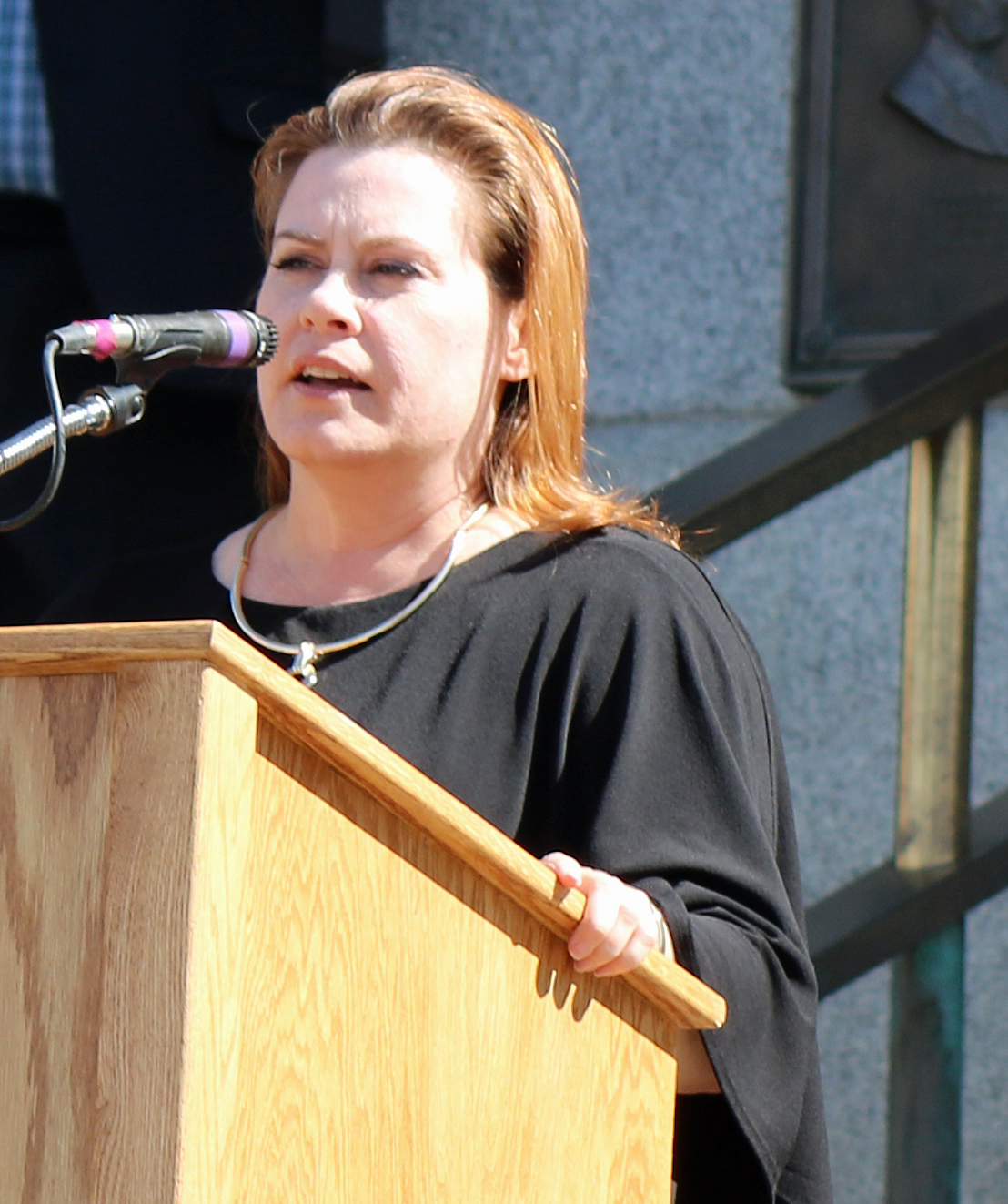

Member of the Colorado House of Representatives from the 63rd district
- In office January 9, 2013 – January 13, 2021
- Preceded by: Jon Becker
- Succeeded by: Dan Woog

Personal details
- Party: Republican
- Education: Indiana University, Bloomington (BA)
- Website: Official website

Lori A. Saine is an American politician who served as on the Weld County Board of Commissioners from 2020 to 2024, representing District 3. Previously, she served as a Republican member of the Colorado House of Representatives for the 63rd district from January 9, 2013 to January 13, 2021. Saine was a candidate for Colorado's 8th congressional district, but lost the Republican primary, coming in third place.

== Education ==
Saine earned a Bachelor of Arts degree in psychology, business, and biology from Indiana University Bloomington.

== Career ==
Prior to entering politics, Saine worked as a regional sales director. She was also a member of the Dacono City Council. She was elected to the Colorado House of Representatives in November 2012 and assumed office in January 2013. During her final term in the House, Saine served as a vice chair of the Legislative Audit Committee.

When Republican Representative Jon Becker left the Legislature and left the District 63 seat open, Saine won the June 26, 2012, Republican primary with 3,444 votes (93%) against a write-in candidate, and won the November 6, 2012 General election with 21,162 votes (56%) against Democratic nominee Tim Erickson who had run for a House seat in 2004.

In December 2017, Saine was arrested at Denver International Airport for carrying a loaded handgun through security. Saine said she did not know that her gun was in her purse when she went to the airport. No charges were pressed.

In January 2019, Saine was criticized by Democrat Leslie Herod for inaccurately equating the lynchings of African-Americans with that of whites during the Reconstruction era following the Civil War.

In December 2020, in her role as chair of the Legislative Audit Committee, she held a hearing to examine allegations of fraud and irregularities during Colorado's 2020 elections amid Donald Trump's false claims of fraud in the presidential election. The hearing ultimately found no evidence of electoral irregularities or fraud.

In 2020, Saine was term-limited as a state representative. In the 2020 general election, she was elected to represent District 3 of the Weld County Board of County Commissioners.

In November 2021, Saine announced her candidacy for Colorado's 8th congressional district in the 2022 elections. She lost to Barbara Kirkmeyer in the Republican primary.

In 2024, Saine ran for reelection to the Weld County Board of County Commissioners, but ran against fellow Republican Perry Buck for the at-large seat Buck held, rather than the District 3 seat Saine held. Buck won the primary with over 63% of the vote.
