= Earth System Research Laboratories =

Research facility in Boulder, Colorado, United States

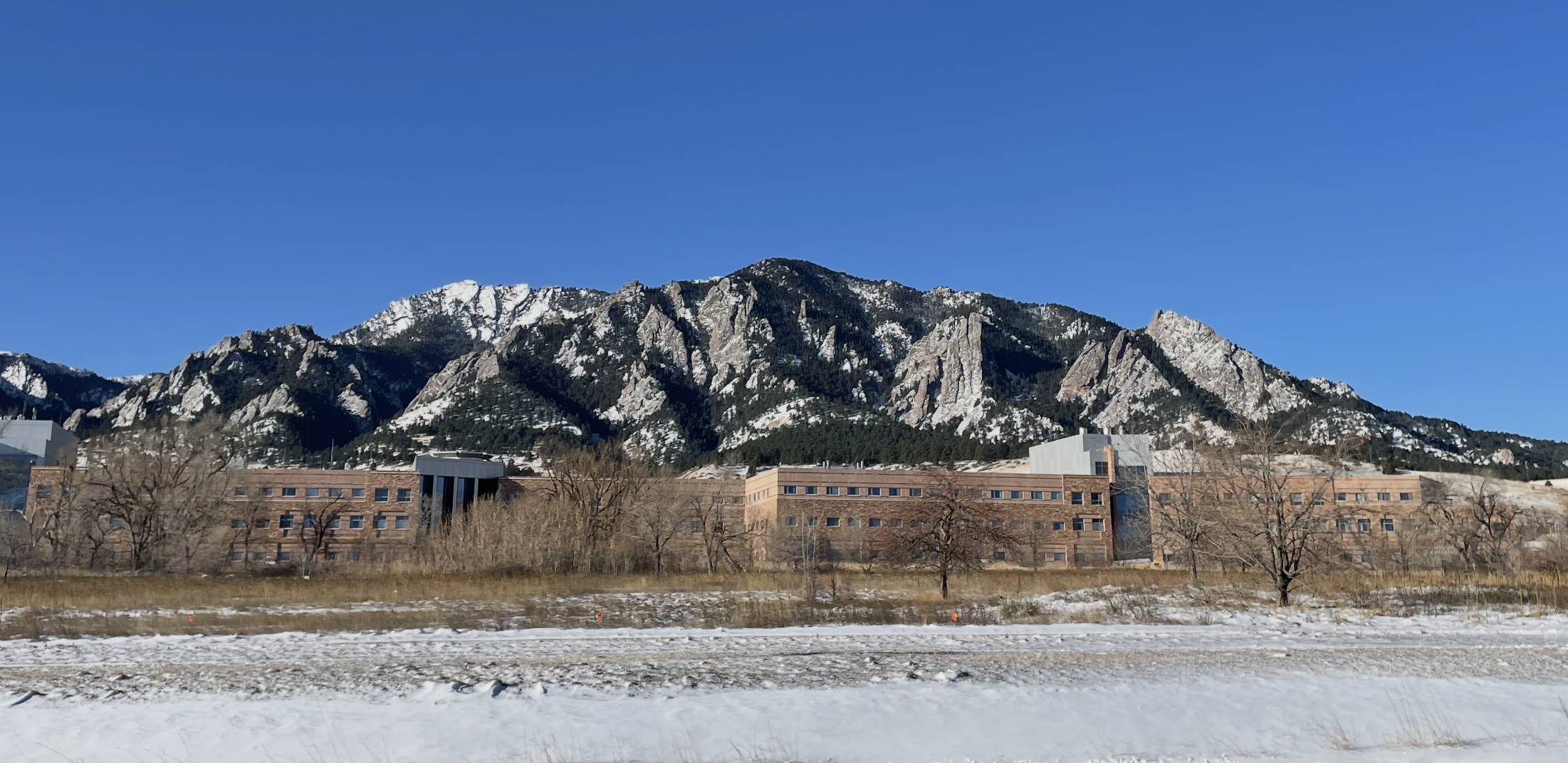
David Skaggs Research Center

NOAA

The Earth System Research Laboratories (ESRL) is an alliance of four NOAA scientific labs, all located in the David Skaggs Research Center on the Department of Commerce campus in Boulder, Colorado. Organized under NOAA's Office of Oceanic and Atmospheric Research, ESRL studies weather, climate, air quality, water resources, and other Earth system components. ESRL collaborates with researchers and scholars from nearby University of Colorado and Colorado State University, and partners with the National Center for Atmospheric Research.

== Laboratories ==
=== Chemical Sciences Laboratory ===
The Chemical Sciences Laboratory (CSL) studies the chemical and physical processes that affect Earth's atmospheric composition and climate.

=== Global Monitoring Laboratory ===
The Global Monitoring Laboratory (GML) researches greenhouse gas and carbon cycle feedbacks, changes in clouds, aerosols, and surface radiation, and the recovery of stratospheric ozone.

=== Global Systems Laboratory ===
The Global Systems Laboratory (GSL) develops weather forecast models, decision support tools, visualization systems, and uses high-performance computing technology to support a Weather-Ready Nation.

=== Physical Sciences Laboratory ===
The Physical Sciences Laboratory (PSL) conducts weather, climate, and hydrologic research around hydrologic extremes.

==== Evaporative Demand Drought Index ====
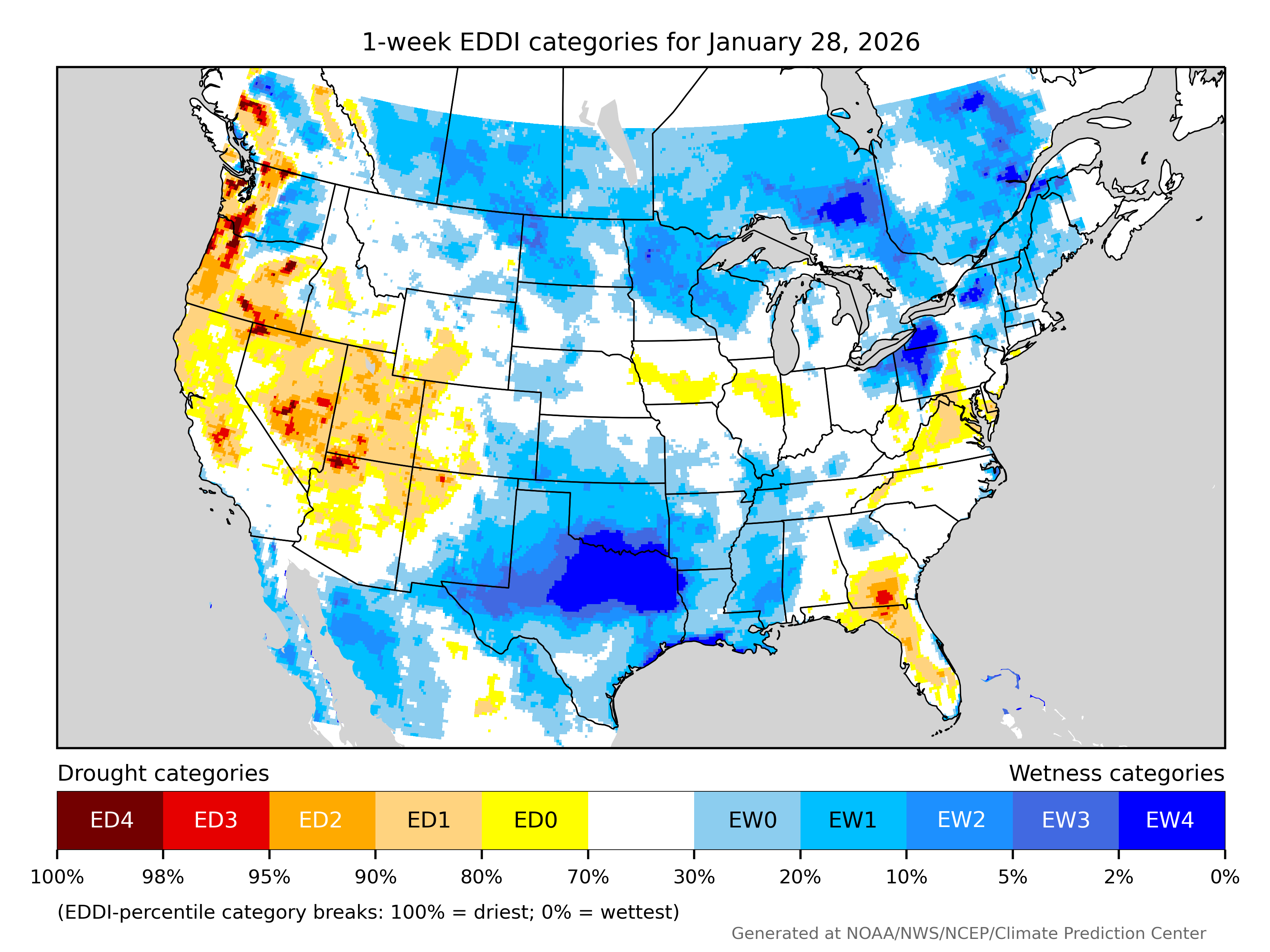
Historical EDDI map from January 2026

The Evaporative Demand Drought Index (EDDI) is an experimental tool used by the laboratory for monitoring and early warning of drought conditions. It assesses how unusual the atmospheric evaporative demand, also referred to as "the thirst of the atmosphere", is for specific locations over various time periods.

== History ==
On October 1, 2005, NOAA's Aeronomy Laboratory, Climate Diagnostics Center, Climate Monitoring and Diagnostics Laboratory, Environmental Technology Laboratory, and Forecast Systems Laboratory were merged into four divisions of the newly formed Earth System Research Laboratory. These were the Chemical Sciences Division, Global Monitoring Division, Global Systems Division, and Physical Sciences Division.

On April 2, 2020, NOAA designated the four divisions of the Earth System Research Laboratory in Boulder as full laboratories within the NOAA Oceanic and Atmospheric Research line office to meet recent shifts in mission-essential priorities. The four laboratories retained their core research missions and continue to collaborate closely with each other and other NOAA Research laboratories to improve understanding and ability to predict changes in Earth's atmosphere, climate, and weather.
