= Joyce Foster =

American politician

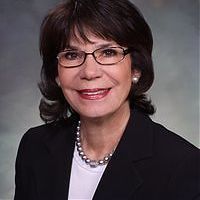

Member of the Colorado Senate from the 35th district
- In office January 7, 2009 – January 9, 2013
- Preceded by: Ken Gordon
- Succeeded by: Larry Crowder

Personal details
- Born: February 13, 1944 (age 82)
- Party: Democratic

Joyce Foster (born February 13, 1944) is a former state legislator in the U.S. state of Colorado. Elected to the Colorado State Senate as a Democrat in 2008, Foster represented Senate District 35, which encompassed southeastern Denver, Colorado.

== Legislative career ==
=== 2008 election ===
Joyce Foster defeated State Representative Alice Borodkin in the contested Democratic primary in August, taking 71 percent of votes cast.

Foster faced Republican Bob Lane in the November 2008 general election. Foster's candidacy was endorsed by the Denver Post, and she won the race with 68 percent of the vote.

=== 2009 legislative session ===
For the 2009 session of the Colorado General Assembly, Foster was named to seats on the Senate Business Committee and the Senate Local Government and Energy Committee, where she will serve as vice-chair.

During the 2009 session, Foster introduced legislation to require the Colorado Division of Wildlife to place a higher priority on predator control, after increasing numbers of coyote attacks south of Denver. The bill, however, was killed in committee due to concerns over its vagueness. Foster also introduced a resolution in support of the nation of Israel that was criticized by peace activists as reflecting a one-sided perspective on the Israeli–Palestinian conflict.

In May 2010 it was alleged that Sen. Foster had introduced an amendment to a bill concerning the registered sex offenders. Multiple news media have reported that Julian Newman, Sen. Foster's brother-in-law, was involved with a consensual adult 21+ relationship with a client he was paid to treat.

== Retirement ==
The 2011 reapportionment process that followed the 2010 census resulted in Foster's home being included in the same senate district as Pat Steadman's. Both Steadman and Foster are Democratic incumbents. Foster announced that she would defer to Steadman and not seek reelection in 2012.
