= Katie Wallace =

American politician

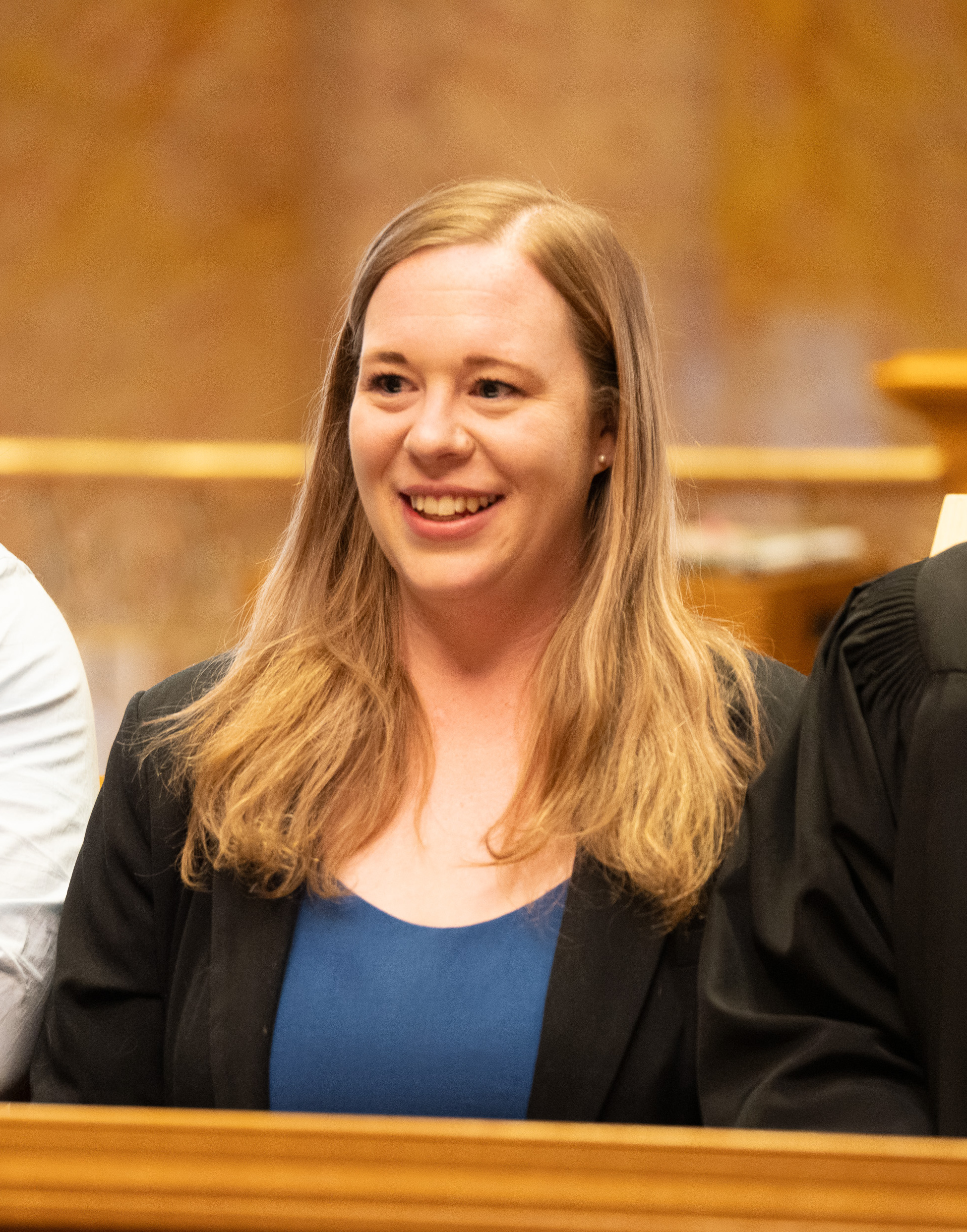

Member of the Colorado Senate from the 17th district
- Incumbent
- Assumed office March 21, 2025
- Preceded by: Sonya Jaquez Lewis

Personal details
- Party: Democratic
- Education: University of Colorado Boulder

Katie Wallace is an American politician and political organizer from Longmont, Colorado. A Democrat, Wallace currently represents Colorado's 17th Senate district. Wallace was selected by vacancy committee to represent the district following the resignation of Sonya Jaquez Lewis.

== Background ==
Wallace began her political career as a field organizer for Barack Obama's 2012 presidential campaign. Wallace, worked for the campaign arm of the Colorado Senate Democrat Caucus and as a federal policy advisor to U.S. Representative Joe Neguse. She has also served in the office of U.S. Representative Yadira Caraveo, and served as a legislative aide for the Colorado General Assembly.

== Electoral history ==
Wallace was selected by vacancy committee to represent the 17th district following the resignation of Sonya Jaquez Lewis. Wallace received 60% of the vacancy committee vote in the first round of voting.

Wallace was re-elected in 2026, defeating Patricia Milller in the general election.

== Legislative record ==
On March 18, 2026, Wallace voted against a bill that would require jail time for people convicted of sexually assaulting children, during consideration in the Colorado legislature.
