= Jon Becker =

American politician (born 1972)

Member of the Colorado House of Representatives from the 65th district
- In office January 2, 2015 – January 4, 2019
- Preceded by: Jerry Sonnenberg
- Succeeded by: Rod Pelton

Member of the Colorado House of Representatives from the 63rd district
- In office January 2, 2011 – January 9, 2013
- Preceded by: Cory Gardner
- Succeeded by: Lori Saine

Personal details
- Born: October 20, 1972 (age 53) Fort Morgan, Colorado
- Party: Republican
- Spouse: Christal
- Children: two

Jon Jeremy Becker (born October 20, 1972) is an American politician and a former Republican member of the Colorado House of Representatives representing District 65.

He attended Colorado Christian University (MBA, International Business), Colorado State University (BS, Business Administration), and Morgan Community College. Becker is the director for economic development at Viaero Wireless. He is also an adjunct professor at Morgan Community College. He has also served as the executive director of the Morgan County Economic Development Corporation and as Commissioner for Morgan County, Colorado. He lives in Fort Morgan, Colorado and is married with two children.

Becker previously sat in the Colorado House of Representatives representing District 63 from 2011 to 2013 when he did not seek re-election because of reapportionment. He was elected once again in November 2014 to represent District 65.

In February, 2018, Becker announced he would not seek re-election to his house seat later in the year. Instead, he stated he intends to run for the position of Morgan County Commissioner, an office he held prior to becoming a state rep.
