= Ken Gordon (Colorado politician) =

Colorado politician

Member of the Colorado House of Representatives

Personal details
- Born: 1950 Detroit, Michigan
- Died: December 2013 (aged 62–63)
- Party: Democratic
- Education: University of Michigan

Ken Gordon (1950 – December 2013) was a lawyer and politician in Colorado. A Democrat, he served in the Colorado House of Representatives for District 6 and as Majority Leader in the Colorado Senate. Earlier in his career he was a public defender.

He was born in Detroit, Michigan. He attended the University of Michigan from 1967-1971. He received his law degree from Boston University. He had two children. He was Jewish. He ran for Secretary of State of Colorado in 2006, but lost the general election to Mike Coffman.

Colorado House of Representatives
Preceded by Pat Grant	Member of the Colorado House of Representatives from the 9th district 1993–2001	Succeeded by Andrew Romanoff
Preceded by Carol Snyder	Minority Leader of the Colorado House of Representatives; 1999–2001	Succeeded by Dan Grossman
Colorado Senate
Preceded by Dottie Wham	Member of the Colorado Senate from the 35th district 2001–2009	Succeeded by Joyce Foster
Preceded by Mark Hillman	Majority Leader of the Colorado Senate; 2005–2009	Succeeded by Brandon Shaffer
