= Colorado's 12th House of Representatives district =

American legislative district

Colorado's 12th State House of Representatives district
Representative
Kyle Brown; D–Louisville
- Demographics: 75% White; 1% Black; 12% Hispanic; 5% Asian; 0% Native American; 6% Multiracial
- Population (2021): 85,779

Colorado's 12th House of Representatives district is one of 65 districts in the Colorado House of Representatives. It has been represented by Democrat Kyle Brown since 2023.

== Geography ==
District 12 is based in Boulder County and includes the Boulder suburbs of Niwot, Lafayette and Louisville.

== Members ==
- William Swenson (until 2003)
- Paul Weissmann (2003–2011)
- Matt Jones (2011–2013)
- Mike Foote (2013–2019)
- Sonya Jaquez Lewis (2019–2021)
- Tracey Bernett (2021–2023)
- Kyle Brown (since 2023)
