= Cleave Simpson =

American politician

- Simpson in 2024

Minority Leader of the Colorado Senate
- Incumbent
- Assumed office June 12, 2025
- Preceded by: Paul Lundeen

Member of the Colorado Senate from the 6th district
- Incumbent
- Assumed office January 9, 2023
- Preceded by: Redistricted

Member of the Colorado Senate from the 35th district
- In office January 13, 2021 – January 9, 2023
- Preceded by: Larry Crowder
- Succeeded by: Redistricted

Personal details
- Born: Cleave Alan Simpson Jr. 1960 or 1961 (age 64–65) Alamosa, Colorado, U.S.
- Party: Republican
- Spouse: Cathy
- Education: Colorado School of Mines (BS)
- Website: Campaign website

Cleave Alan Simpson Jr. (born 1960/1961) is an American politician from Alamosa, Colorado. A Republican, Simpson represents Colorado State Senate District 6. Prior to the implementation of 2020 redistricting in 2023, Simpson represented the former Colorado State Senate District 35. He was elected as minority leader in June 2025. In November 2026, Governor-elect Phill Weiser nominated Simpson as Commissioner of Agriculture of Colorado.

== Background ==
Simpson is the general manager of the Rio Grande Water Conservation District and also served on the Adams State University Board of Trustees from 2015 to 2020. A native of the San Luis Valley, he is a fourth-generation farmer and rancher there. He graduated from the Colorado School of Mines in 1984.

== Electoral history ==
In the 2020 Republican primary election of Colorado's 35th Senate district, Simpson ran unopposed. In the 2020 general election, Simpson defeated his Democratic Party opponent, winning 60.12% of the vote.

Simpson ran for re-election in 2024. In the Republican primary election held June 25, 2024, he ran unopposed. In the general election held November 5, 2024, Simpson defeated Democratic candidate Vivian Smotherman, winning 55.91% of the total votes cast.

2020 Colorado Senate election, 35th District
Party	Candidate	Votes	%
Republican	Cleave Simpson	43,970	60.12%
Democratic	Carlos R. Lopez	29,163	39.88%
Total votes		73,133	100%
Republican hold			

Colorado Senate
Preceded by Paul Lundeen	Minority Leader of the Colorado Senate; 2025–present	Incumbent
