= Kyle Brown (politician) =

American politician

Member of the Colorado House of Representatives from the 12th district
- Incumbent
- Assumed office February 1, 2023
- Preceded by: Tracey Bernett

Personal details
- Party: Democratic
- Education: Georgetown University; Harvard University

Kyle Brown is an American politician serving as a member of the Colorado House of Representatives from the 12th district since his appointment in 2023. A member of the Democratic Party, Brown was previously a member of the Louisville City Council.

== Personal life ==
Brown grew up in Louisville, Colorado. He received a bachelor's degree from Georgetown University and a doctorate in genetics from Harvard University. As of July 2023, Brown lived in Louisville.

== Political career ==
Brown served as a member of the Louisville City Council from January 2020 until January 2023. He was elected to ward 3 in December 2019 to replace Ashley Stolzmann, who resigned to become mayor of Louisville.

Brown was appointed to the Colorado House of Representatives' 12th district in January 2023, replacing Tracey Bernett, who resigned over legal issues and was convicted of criminal charges for lying about her residence. He ran on a progressive platform, promising to increase access to health care and securing affordable housing. He was sworn in on February 1.
