= Brandon Shaffer =

American politician

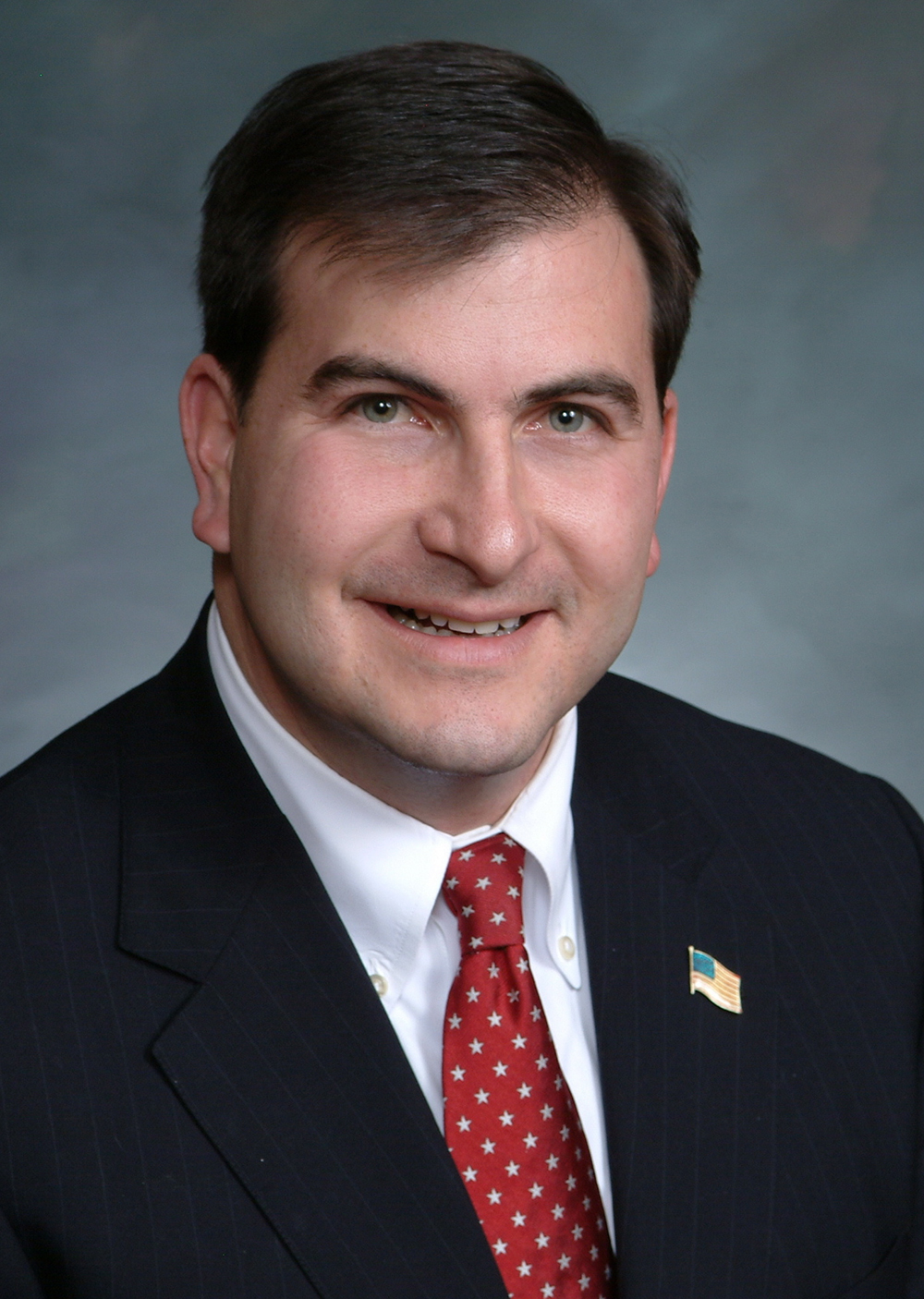

President of the Colorado Senate
- In office May 6, 2009 – January 2013
- Preceded by: Peter Groff
- Succeeded by: John Morse

Member of the Colorado Senate from the 17th district
- In office January 2005 – January 2013
- Succeeded by: Matt Jones

Personal details
- Born: March 22, 1971 (age 55) Denver, Colorado, U.S.
- Party: Democratic
- Profession: Attorney

Brandon Shaffer (born March 22, 1971) is the former President of the Colorado State Senate. He represented Senate District 17, which encompasses the cities of Longmont, Lafayette, Erie, and Louisville. Shaffer, a lifelong Democrat, was first elected as a State Senator in November 2004, and was reelected in 2008. Following the resignation of Senate President Peter Groff in 2009, Shaffer was elected to the post, while Senator John Morse (D-Colorado Springs) became Majority Leader.

Shaffer was the Democratic nominee for Colorado's 4th Congressional District in 2012, but lost to then incumbent Republican Cory Gardner in the general election.

== Early life, education and military career ==
Brandon Shaffer was born on March 22, 1971, in Denver and graduated from East High School in 1989, having served as the "Head Boy" and Student Body President. After graduation Shaffer attended Stanford University which he paid for with a Navy ROTC scholarship. Shaffer earned a bachelor's degree in political science, and also participated in the Stanford-in-Government program. While involved in the program, Shaffer worked as an intern for Colorado Governor Roy Romer as well as the Commission on National and Community Service in Washington, D.C. Shaffer graduated with honors in 1993. After college Shaffer was commissioned into active duty in the United States Navy. After spending a year in San Diego, he was deployed to Yokosuka, Japan. While there, Shaffer served aboard the USS Hewitt (DD-966) as an Anti-Submarine Warfare Officer, Deck Division Officer and Navigator. It was in Japan that he met his wife, elementary school teacher, Jessica Clark.

== Political career ==
Shaffer left the navy in 1997 and returned to the United States in 1998. During his final year in Japan he became a substitute teacher and taught English to Japanese students at a local YMCA. Once he returned he was accepted into law school at the University of Colorado. Shaffer became involved in Colorado politics in 2000 as the Get Out The Vote coordinator for Boulder County. Shaffer graduated from law school in 2001. Following graduation, Shaffer continued his political career serving as the Boulder County Get out the Vote coordinator again in 2002. In November 2004 Shaffer ran a successful State Senate campaign against Republican candidate Sandy Hume, and libertarian candidate Bo Shaffer for Colorado's District 17.

Shaffer was elected by his peers to serve as the Senate Majority Leader, Senate Assistant Majority Leader and Chairman of the Senate Judiciary Committee. He also served on the Senate Health and Human Services and Finance committees. In 2009, Shaffer became the President of the State Senate following the resignation of then-Senate President Peter Groff.

=== 2012 Congressional campaign ===
On July 4, 2011, Shaffer announced that he was running for Congress from Colorado's 4th District, challenging incumbent Cory Gardner. Shaffer won the Democratic primary, but lost to Gardner in the November 6, 2012, general election.

== See also ==
- Profile at the Colorado Senate
- Financial information (federal office) at the Federal Election Commission
- Profile at Vote Smart
