= Sonya Jaquez Lewis =

American politician from Colorado

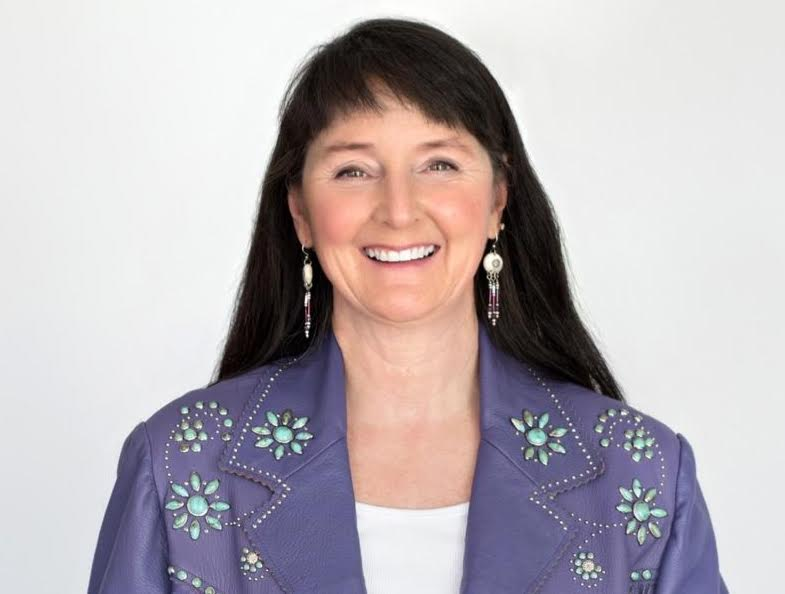

Member of the Colorado Senate from the 17th district
- In office January 13, 2021 – February 17, 2025
- Preceded by: Mike Foote
- Succeeded by: Katie Wallace

Member of the Colorado House of Representatives from the 12th district
- In office January 4, 2019 – January 13, 2021
- Preceded by: Mike Foote
- Succeeded by: Tracey Bernett

Personal details
- Born: Charlotte, North Carolina, U.S.
- Party: Democratic
- Education: University of North Carolina at Chapel Hill

Sonya Jaquez Lewis is an American politician who served as a member of the Colorado Senate from the 17th district. She is a member of the Democratic Party and resides in Lafayette, Colorado. Previously, she served in the Colorado House of Representatives, representing the 12th district in Boulder County.

== Early life and education ==
Sonya Jaquez Lewis was born to Georgia and Robert Lewis in Charlotte, North Carolina, in c. 1956-1957. Lewis graduated from University of North Carolina at Chapel Hill with a bachelor's degree in biology in 1981. She was a member of Alpha Chi Sigma and on the board of directors of WXYC.

== Career ==
=== Local politics ===
Lewis was elected to the Campus Governing Council in 1977 and 1979. She placed third in the initial round of the 1978 student president election. She was appointed to Carrboro, North Carolina's town planning board in 1980.

Lewis announced her campaign for a seat on the Carrboro Board of Aldermen on September 16, 1981, but later withdrew in favor of incumbent aldermen, who were fellow members of the Carrboro Community Coalition. She was appointed to the Durham County Women's Commission by the county board of commissioners in 1987, and later became its chair. During the 1990 senatorial election she was county coordinator for Harvey Gantt's campaign in Durham County. She worked for his campaign during the 1996 election.

Lewis served as an at-large delegate to the 2008 Democratic National Convention from Colorado and from Colorado's 2nd congressional district in 2012 and 2016.

=== State legislature ===
During Lewis' tenure in the state house she served on the Public Health Care and Human Services committee and as vice-chair of the State, Veterans and Military Affairs committee. She was a member of the LGBTQ Caucus.

Lewis refused to sign off her aide's time card in December 2023, and Senate President Steve Fenberg had to sign it instead. Fenberg warned Lewis about her poor behavior to her staffers and later stated that they would not help her vet or place new aides for her in the upcoming legislative session. She was removed as chair of the Local Government and Housing Committee in January 2024, and her sponsorship was removed from legislation to prevent wage theft in the construction industry. Lewis denied the allegations made against her. On December 3, she was barred from having state-paid aides after a misconduct complaint was filed about her using staffers to do yard work and bartend.

On February 18, 2025, Lewis announced on Facebook at 6 a.m. MST that she had resigned, with it having gone into effect the previous day at 7:15 p.m. MST. Resigning from the state legislature ended the ethics probe against her. Two hours later the Senate Ethics Committee reported that Lewis had submitted at least one fabricated letter of support sent to the panel, claiming that it was from Anna McLean, a former aide. Lewis claimed that the letter was supposed to be information she gathered from conversations with McLean, despite it being in the first person and using her name on the letterhead, and that it was accidentally submitted. Another aide, Tara Mastracchio, also said that the letter submitted by Lewis with her name attached was not written by her.

The district attorneys' offices in Denver and Boulder investigated Lewis for using deceit in an attempt to influence a public servant and signature forgeries. On July 6, 2025, the Denver District Attorney's Office charged Lewis with the felony offense of attempting to influence a public servant. The charge can result in a $500,000 fine or up to six years in prison. Following a three-day jury trial held the week of January 26, 2026, Jaquez Lewis was found guilty of four felonies, including three counts of forgery and one count of attempting to influence a public servant. On February 27, 2026, Lewis was sentenced to two years of probation and 150 hours of public service, as well as being ordered to pay a fine of $3,000.

== Electoral history ==
2018 Colorado House of Representatives 12th district election
Primary election
Party	Candidate	Votes	%
Democratic	Sonya Jaquez Lewis	13,130	100.00%
Total votes		13,130	100.00%
General election
Democratic	Sonya Jaquez Lewis	30,880	73.54%
Independent	Teresa Stets	11,110	26.46%
Total votes		41,990	100.00%

2020 Colorado Senate 17th district election
Primary election
Party	Candidate	Votes	%
Democratic	Sonya Jaquez Lewis	36,163	100.00%
Total votes		36,163	100.00%
General election
Democratic	Sonya Jaquez Lewis	65,226	67.88%
Republican	Matthew D. Menza	30,848	32.10%
Independent	Andrew J. O'Connor (write-in)	19	0.02%
Total votes		96,093	100.00%

2024 Colorado Senate 17th district election
Primary election
Party	Candidate	Votes	%
Democratic	Sonya Jaquez Lewis (incumbent)	19,836	100.00%
Total votes		19,836	100.00%
General election
Democratic	Sonya Jaquez Lewis (incumbent)	63,308	66.77%
Republican	Tom Van Lone	31,509	33.23%
Total votes		94,817	100.00%

== Works cited ==
=== News ===
- "Bernie Sanders campaign gets another win in Colorado". The Denver Post. April 19, 2016. Archived from the original on June 3, 2023.
- "Colorado's delegates". The Denver Post. August 23, 2008. Archived from the original on June 3, 2023.
- "Colorado Senate District 17: Sonya Jaquez Lewis, Matthew Menza and Andrew O'Connor". Colorado Politics. October 12, 2020. Archived from the original on June 3, 2023.
- "National delegates to take their voices to Charlotte". Colorado Politics. April 20, 2012. Archived from the original on June 3, 2023.
- "Titone to chair the legislative LGBTQ Caucus". Colorado Politics. March 11, 2021. Archived from the original on June 3, 2023.
- Coltrain, Nick (April 3, 2024). "Colorado state senator removed from wage-theft bill after accusation she refused to pay staffer". The Denver Post. Archived from the original on December 9, 2024.
- Goodland, Marianne (February 18, 2025). "Colorado Sen Sonya Jaquez Lewis resigns amid ethics investigation and allegations of fabricating letter of support". Colorado Politics. Archived from the original on March 13, 2025.
- Klamann, Seth (March 11, 2025). "Former state senator now faces investigation by Denver, Boulder district attorneys after resigning amid ethics probe". The Denver Post. Archived from the original on March 13, 2025.
- Paul, Jesse (December 5, 2024). "Colorado senator barred from having state-paid aides after repeated complaints from staffers". The Colorado Sun. Archived from the original on December 9, 2024.
- Paul, Jesse (February 18, 2025). "Democratic senator resigns from Colorado legislature amid ethics investigation, new allegation of fabricated support letter". The Colorado Sun. Archived from the original on March 13, 2025.
- Paul, Jesse (July 21, 2025). "Democratic state senator who resigned amid ethics investigation now faces felony criminal charge in Denver". The Colorado Sun. Archived from the original on July 22, 2025.
- Paul, Jesse (January 28, 2026). "Former Colorado state senator convicted of felonies for fabricating letters amid ethics investigation". The Colorado Sun. Archived from the original on January 30, 2026.

=== Newspapers ===
- "Carrboro Deletes Some Criminal Fines". Chapel Hill News. December 10, 1980. p. 1B. Archived from the original on June 2, 2023 – via Newspapers.com.
- "Charlottean Speaks". The Charlotte Observer. March 25, 1987. p. 5D. Archived from the original on June 2, 2023 – via Newspapers.com.
- "CGC member Lewis sees office's potentials". The Daily Tar Heel. January 23, 1978. p. 1. Archived from the original on June 2, 2023 – via Newspapers.com.
- "Cheshire joins race for mayor". The Herald-Sun. September 17, 1981. p. 1C. Archived from the original on June 2, 2023 – via Newspapers.com.
- "County Names Women's Panel". The Herald-Sun. March 10, 1987. p. 3B. Archived from the original on June 2, 2023 – via Newspapers.com.
- "Democratic Senate hopefuls address Durham Rotarians". The Herald-Sun. April 16, 1996. p. C1. Archived from the original on June 2, 2023 – via Newspapers.com.
- "Enthusiasm opens Gantt headquarters". The Herald-Sun. June 28, 1990. p. 1A. Archived from the original on June 2, 2023 – via Newspapers.com.
- "Latinos urged to back Obama". The Charlotte Observer. September 2, 2012. p. 2B. Archived from the original on June 2, 2023 – via Newspapers.com.
- "Lewis edged out, declines recount in president race". The Daily Tar Heel. February 16, 1978. p. 1. Archived from the original on June 2, 2023 – via Newspapers.com.
- "Lewis files for town board". The Daily Tar Heel. September 17, 1981. p. 3. Archived from the original on June 2, 2023 – via Newspapers.com.
- "Miller, Moss enter runoff; other tallies announced". The Daily Tar Heel. February 11, 1977. p. 1. Archived from the original on June 2, 2023 – via Newspapers.com.
- "Moss, Tagalos win in senior class races". The Daily Tar Heel. February 16, 1979. p. 1. Archived from the original on June 2, 2023 – via Newspapers.com.
- "Ms. Lewis Withdraws From Carrboro Race". The Herald-Sun. October 2, 1981. p. 17A. Archived from the original on June 2, 2023 – via Newspapers.com.
- "Panel to mark "Women's Equality Day"". The Herald-Sun. August 25, 1987. p. 1C. Archived from the original on June 2, 2023 – via Newspapers.com.
- "Rezoning For Homes Approved". The Herald-Sun. December 10, 1980. p. 15C. Archived from the original on June 2, 2023 – via Newspapers.com.
