= David Skaggs Research Center =

Research facility in Boulder, U.S.

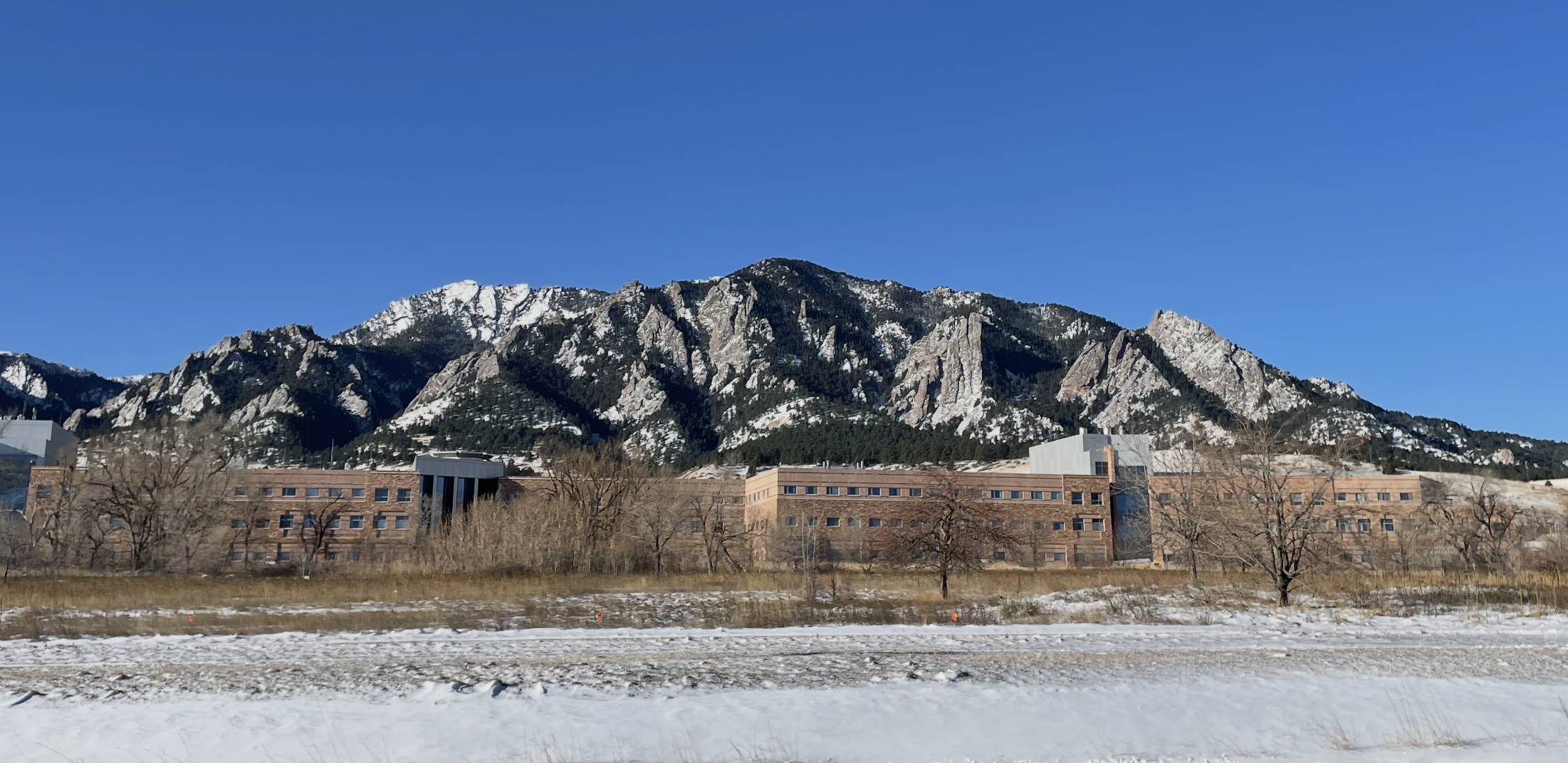
David Skaggs Research Center

The David E. Skaggs Research Center (DSRC) is a 372,000-square-foot (34,600 m^{2}) research and office facility for the National Oceanic and Atmospheric Administration (NOAA), located in Boulder, CO. The building includes 698 offices, 20 conference rooms, 98 laboratories and three major computer centers, and has been designed by Fentress Architects.

== Name ==
"Named for U.S. Rep. David Skaggs who represented Colorado's 2nd Congressional District from 1987–99, the Skaggs Research Center was constructed at the base of the Flatirons rock formation in Boulder, Colorado on land already owned by the United States Department of Commerce (DOC). In 1989, Congressman Skaggs worked to pass an appropriation for the new facility and over the next six years helped NOAA negotiate key issues with the City of Boulder and Indian tribes as the project went forward."

== Construction ==
The project was initiated in 1987, when the National Oceanic and Atmospheric Administration asked the General Services Administration to consolidate NOAA Boulder and Denver research laboratories, operational centers and offices into one facility. NOAA's divisions along the Front Range were then housed in obsolete and inadequate leased spaces in multiple locations, including the Weather Forecast Office located near Stapleton International Airport in Denver.

The DSRC is home to research organizations including: NOAA's Earth System Research Laboratories (comprising the Chemical Sciences Laboratory, Global Monitoring Laboratory, Global Systems Laboratory, and Physical Sciences Laboratory), National Climatic Data Center - Paleoclimatology, National Geophysical Data Center, National Snow and Ice Data Center, National Weather Service - Space Weather Prediction Center and NOAA Research Joint Institutes: Cooperative Institute for Research in the Atmosphere and Cooperative Institute for Research in Environmental Sciences.
