= Larry Crowder =

American politician

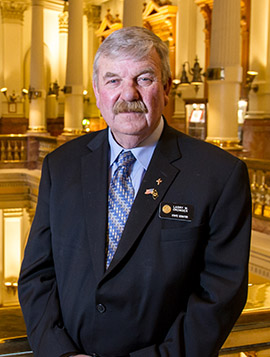

Member of the Colorado Senate from the 35th district
- In office January 15, 2013 – January 13, 2021
- Preceded by: Joyce Foster
- Succeeded by: Cleave Simpson

Personal details
- Born: Otero County, Colorado
- Party: Republican
- Spouse: Cheri
- Children: 2

Larry Crowder is a former Republican legislator in the American State of Colorado. Elected to the Colorado Senate in 2012, he represented Senate District 35 which encompasses parts of Pueblo County, and all of Alamosa County, Baca County, Bent County, Conejos County, Costilla County, Crowley County, Custer County, Huerfano County, Kiowa County, Las Animas County, Mineral County, Otero County, Prowers County, Rio Grande County, and Saguache County.

== Biography and early career ==
Crowder was raised in Manzanola near La Junta, Colorado. When he was 15 years old, his father was killed in an auto accident. His mother Fern, a housewife, was left to raise seven children on her own.

Crowder graduated from Manzanola High School in 1966. He enlisted in the United States Army in 1968. He served his country in Vietnam and was honorably discharged in 1971 as a disabled American veteran.

After discharge from the Army, Crowder married Cheri and the couple lived in Denver. The couple had two children: Patrick in 1974 and Dave in 1976.

In 1976, the family moved to Alamosa, Colorado where Crowder bought a small farm and started a trenching and excavating company. The business contracted with the phone company to bury telephone lines in Southern Colorado. The advent of fiber optic technology in the late 1990s made the excavating company's services obsolete.

In need of income, Crowder began working for the postal service. In 2008, he retired from the postal service and began working as the Veterans Service Officer for Rio Grande County in Colorado.

In 2000 Crowder was elected as the Chairman of the South Central Workforce Board, a position that he held through 2010. Beginning in 2004, he was also elected to serve as the Alamosa County Land Use Board Chair, a position that he continues to serve. Crowder also serves on the Alamosa County Draft Board (2008–present) and acted as the Alamosa County GOP Chair from 2004 to 2010. He is active with the Military Color Guard, Colorado Cattlemen's Association and with various other community initiatives in Southern Colorado.

Crowder continues to farm and live in Alamosa, Colorado with his wife.

== Colorado State Senate ==
=== 2012 Election ===
Due to reapportionment and population shifts, Senate District 35, which used to be located in the urban Denver area, was relocated to the rural eastern plains. District 35 was drawn into the middle of former Senate Districts 1 and 2, which includes Walsenburg, Saguache, Lamar and the surrounding areas.

Crowder faced no opposition in the primary elections, but faced Democratic opponent Crestina Martinez in the general election. Crowder won the election with a 1,672 vote margin.

=== 2013 Legislative Session ===
For the 2013 legislative session, Senator Crowder was appointed to serve on the Health and Human Services Committee, as well as the State, Veterans, and Military Affairs Committee. In April 2013, Crowder became the only Republican in the State Senate to vote to expand Medicaid under the Patient Protection and Affordable Care Act.

=== 2014 Legislative Session ===
In the 2014 legislative session, Crowder sponsored legislation to provide grants to public utilities that pay for broadband development in rural communities through the Connect Colorado Broadband Act. He also worked to create jobs and preserve historic structures by sponsoring the Job Creation & Main Street Revitalization Act that brought $15 million in economic development to Southern Colorado.

=== 2015 Legislative Session ===
During the 2015 legislative session, Crowder sponsored legislation to expedite the licensing process to become an advanced practice nurse, to offer tax incentives to providers who bring broadband services to rural areas and to protect Colorado's drinking water, watersheds and ecologically sensitive areas. He was also named the 2015 Rural Health Champion by the Colorado Rural Health Center.

=== 2016 Legislative Session ===
In 2016, Crowder sponsored SB 74 aimed at expanding voting options for rural voters.

=== 2018 Legislative Session ===
During the 2018 Legislative Session Senator Crowder focused attention of health care matters and veterans’ issues. He ran Senate Bill 112 which would have created a grant program to help support non-profits that provide mental health care for veterans. He also ran Senate Bill 54 to put a cap on fee increases for assisted living facilities and Senate Bill 71 that allowed a task force to continue studying substance abuse issues. Senator Crowder also ran a bill that would have exempted used vehicles from the state sales and use tax.

== Sexual assault allegations ==
Between November 2017 and April 2018, six Colorado state legislators were accused of sexual harassment covering a range of allegations and circumstances. Senator Crowder was accused by Susan Lontine, a Democratic State Representative from Denver, of pinching her buttocks and making sexually inappropriate comments while on the House floor. He apologized, though he did not take steps to acknowledge or change his behavior.

Colorado State Senate President Republican Kevin Grantham issued a statement when the story was published, saying, "We take every allegation of harassment or misconduct seriously. We ask those who feel they have been victims of harassment or inappropriate behavior at the General Assembly to file an official complaint, in confidence that their anonymity and rights will be protected. Going forward, Senate Republican leaders cannot and will not be responding to unsubstantiated or anonymous allegations against members appearing in the press, which the existing complaint process is designed to handle. This process exists to protect confidentiality, respect the rights of both accuser and accused, rigorously review the facts, give a fair hearing to all sides, and impose penalties proportionate to any confirmed offense."
