= Matt Jones (American politician) =

American politician

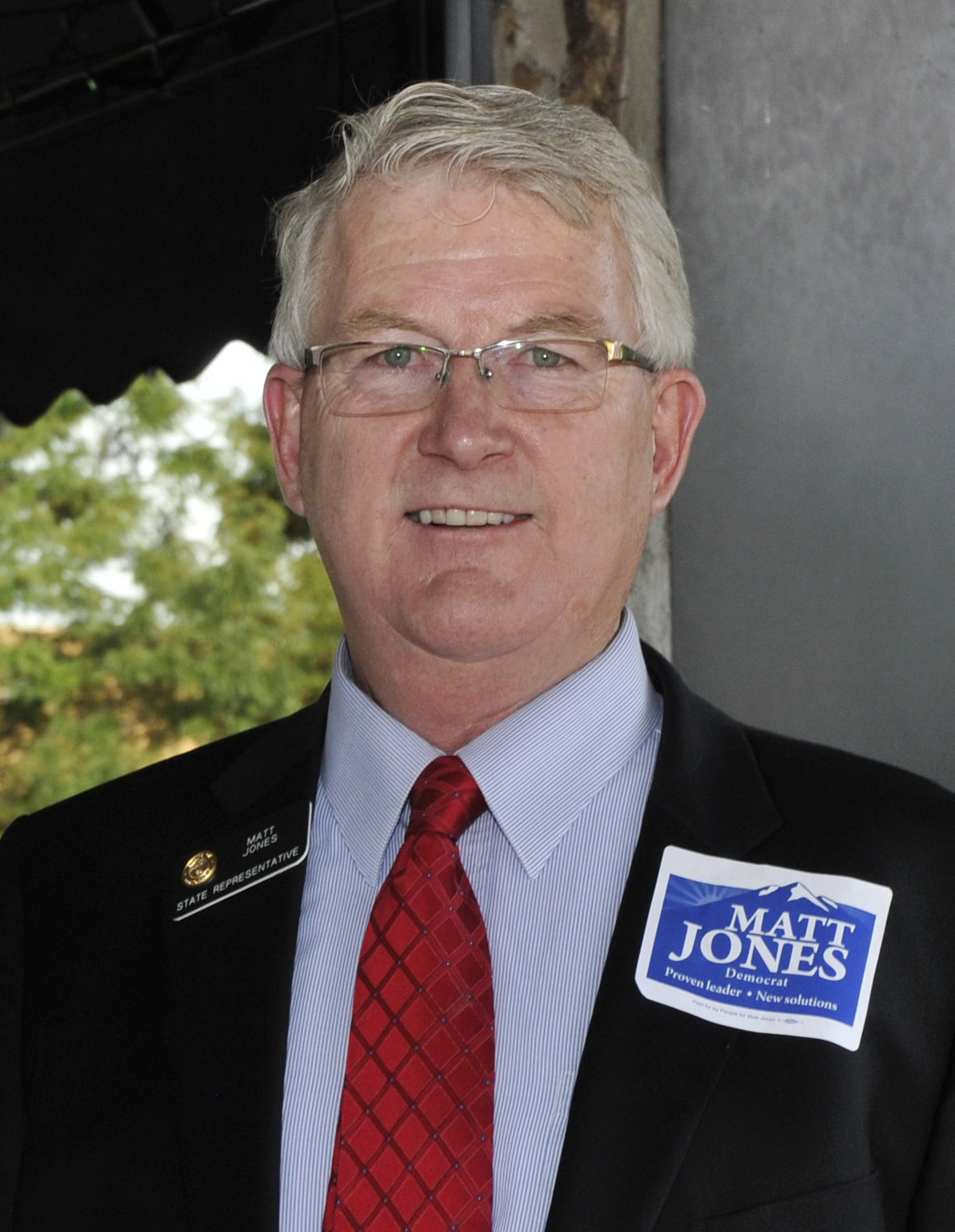
- Jones in 2011

Member of the Colorado Senate from the 17th district
- In office January 9, 2013 – January 4, 2019
- Preceded by: Brandon Shaffer
- Succeeded by: Mike Foote

Member of the Colorado House of Representatives from the 12th district
- In office 2011–2013

Member of the Colorado House of Representatives from the 34th district
- In office 1987–1993

Personal details
- Born: 1954 or 1955 (age 70–71)
- Party: Democratic
- Spouse: Shari Heinlein
- Education: Colorado State University (B.A., M.A.)

Matt Jones is an American politician from Colorado. A Democrat, he served in both the Colorado Senate and the Colorado House of Representatives at two different times, and as a Boulder County Commissioner.

Jones represented the 17th Senate district, which includes Louisville, Lafayette, and portions of Longmont and Erie. Jones previously served in the Colorado House of Representatives from 1987 to 1993 in the 34th House District which included unincorporated Adams County and Federal Heights, and from 2011 to 2013 in the 12th House District which included Louisville, Lafayette and part of Longmont.

Jones graduated from Colorado State University with a B.A. in political science, as well as an M.A. in political science - natural resource policy. Jones has also worked as an open space and trails planner and part-time wildland firefighter. Jones competed in the Pro Mogul Tour in his 20’s.

== Resignation from State Senate ==
In 2018, Jones ran to for the office of commissioner for District 3 of the Boulder County Board of County Commissioners and won. He resigned from the State Senate, and a vacancy committee selected Mike Foote to replace him. Commissioner Jones was sworn in Tuesday, January 8, 2019.
