= Mike Foote =

American politician

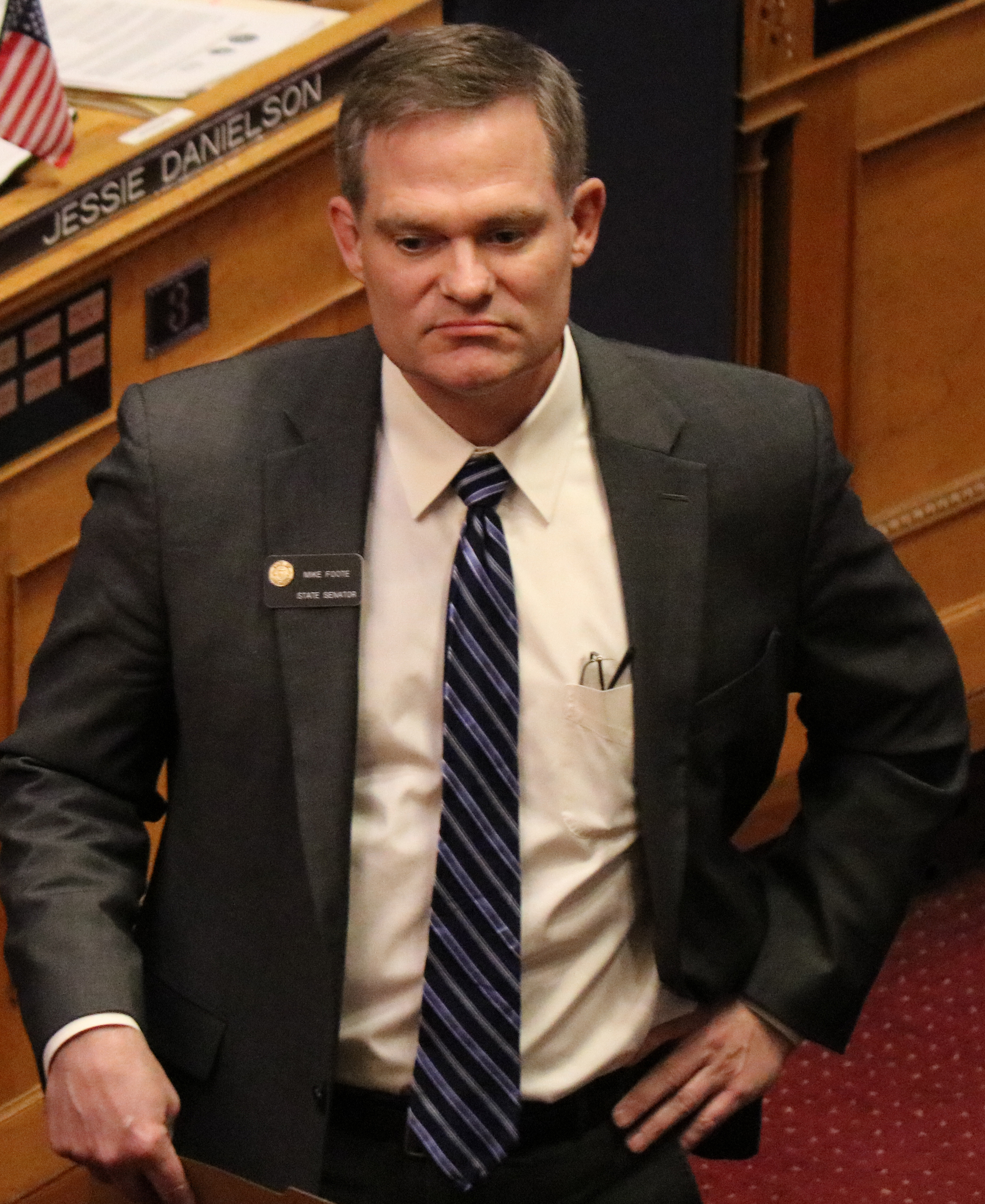
- Foote in 2020

Member of the Colorado Senate from the 17th district
- In office January 4, 2019 – January 13, 2021
- Preceded by: Matt Jones
- Succeeded by: Sonya Jaquez Lewis

Member of the Colorado House of Representatives from the 12th district
- In office January 9, 2013 – January 4, 2019
- Preceded by: Matt Jones
- Succeeded by: Sonya Jaquez Lewis

Personal details
- Party: Democratic
- Education: Indiana University; Josef Korbel School of International Studies; University of Colorado Law School
- Profession: Lawyer
- Website: mikefoote.org

Mike Foote is an American politician and a former member of the Colorado House of Representatives who represented District 12 from January 9, 2013, to early 2019. In December 2018, Foote, a Democrat, was selected to fill the vacant State Senate District 17 seat after state senator Matt Jones resigned to become Boulder County Commissioner.

== Education ==
Foote earned his bachelor's degree from Indiana University Bloomington, his MS from the Josef Korbel School of International Studies and his JD from the University of Colorado Law School.

== Elections ==
- 2012 When incumbent Democratic Representative Matt Jones ran for Colorado Senate and left the District 12 seat open, Foote won the June 26, 2012 Democratic Primary with 3,381 votes (53.7%); and won the three-way November 6, 2012 General election with 27,114 votes (64.5%) against Republican nominee Russ Lyman and Libertarian candidate Matthew Webber.
