= Colorado's 35th Senate district =

American legislative district

Colorado's 35th State Senate district
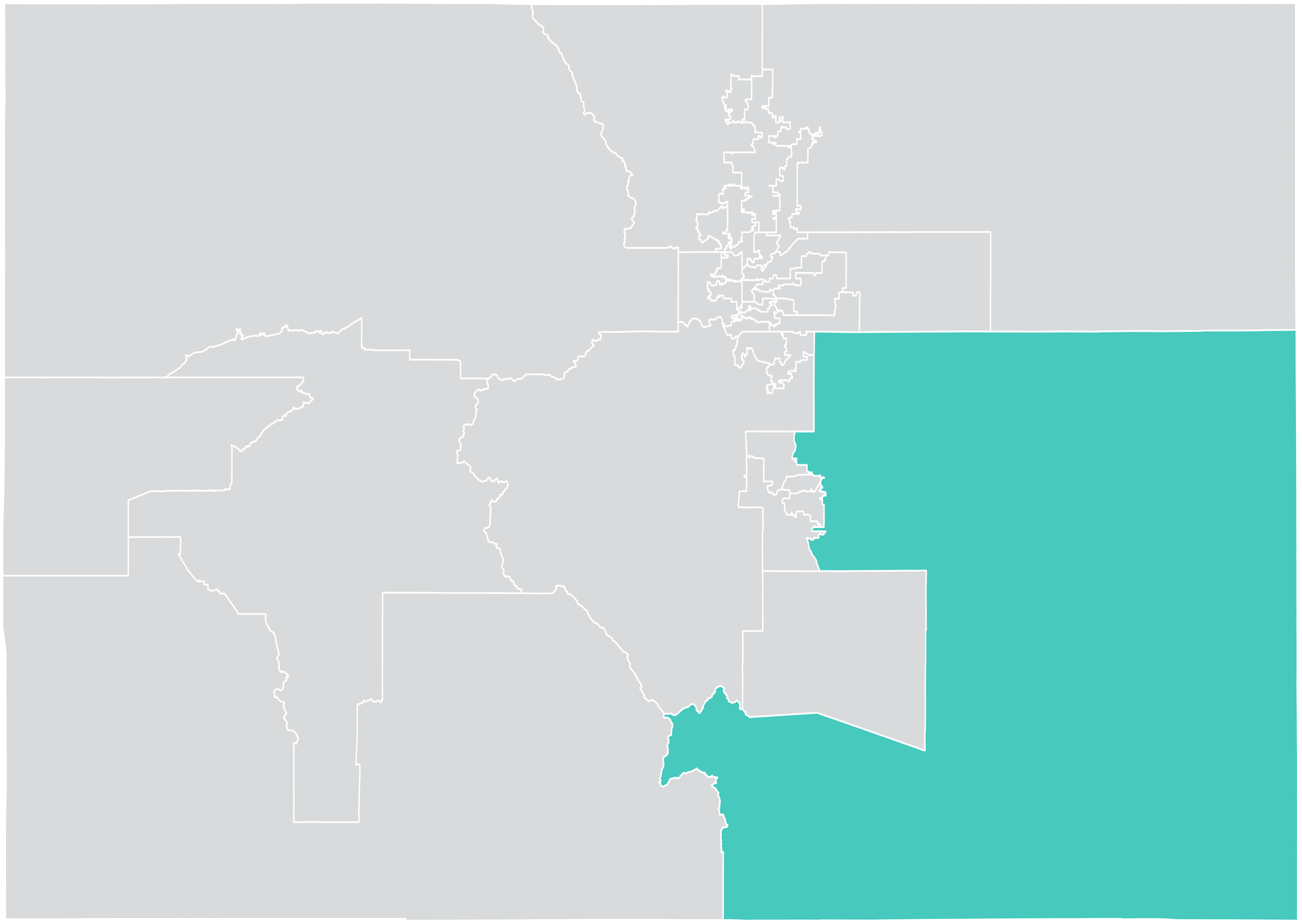
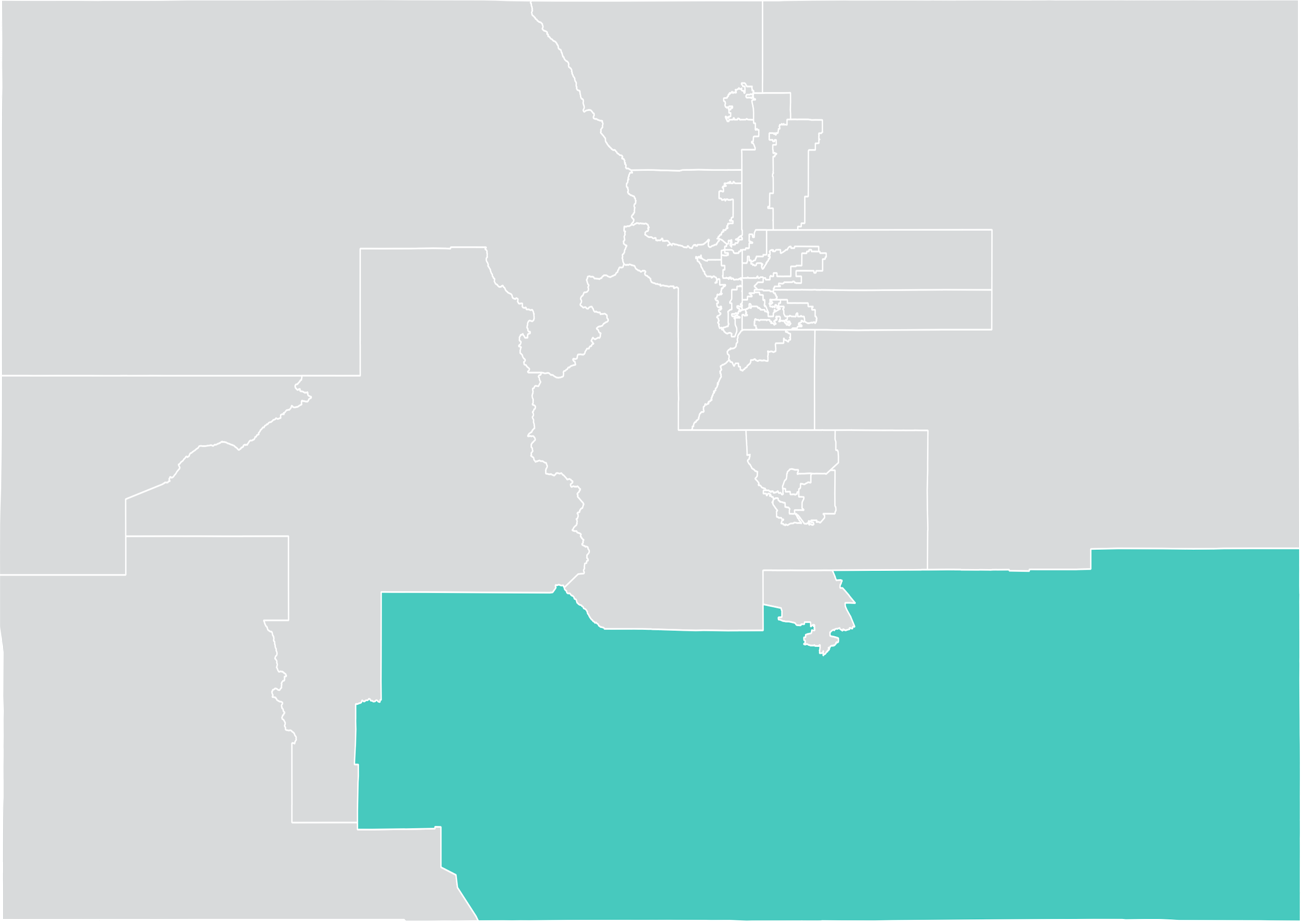
Senator
Rod Pelton; R–Cheyenne Wells
- Registration: 41.0% Republican; 13.4% Democratic; 43.5% No party preference
- Demographics: 77.1% White; 1.9% Black; 20.9% Hispanic; 1% Asian; 1.4% Native American; 0.1% Hawaiian/Pacific Islander; 7.3% Other
- Population (2020) • Voting age: 172,127; 132,939
- Registered voters: 119,194

Colorado's 35th Senate district is one of 35 districts in the Colorado Senate. It has been represented by Republican Rod Pelton since 2023. Prior to redistricting, the district was represented by Republicans Cleave Simpson and before him Larry Crowder.

== Geography ==
District 35 covers a large area of southeastern Colorado. The district includes all or part of Baca, Bent, Cheyenne, Crowley, El Paso, Elbert, Huerfano, Kiowa, Kit Carson, Las Animas, Lincoln, Otero, and Prowers counties, including the communities of Black Forest, Trinidad, Lamar, La Junta, and Rocky Ford.

The district is split between Colorado's 3rd, 4th and 5th congressional districts, and overlaps with the 15th, 20th, 21st, 47th, 56th and 62nd districts of the Colorado House of Representatives.

== Recent election results ==
Colorado state senators are elected to staggered four-year terms. The old 35th district held elections in presidential years, but the new district drawn following the 2020 Census will hold elections in midterm years.

=== 2022 ===
The 2022 election was the first one held under the state's new district lines.

2022 Colorado State Senate election, District 35
Party	Candidate	Votes	%
Republican	Rod Pelton	58,478	74.3
Democratic	Travis Nelson	20,230	25.7
Total votes		78,708	100

== Historical election results ==
=== 2020 ===
2020 Colorado State Senate election, District 35
Party	Candidate	Votes	%
Republican	Cleave Simpson	43,970	60.1
Democratic	Carlos Lopez	29,163	39.9
Total votes		73,133	100
Republican hold			

=== 2016 ===
2016 Colorado State Senate election, District 35
Party	Candidate	Votes	%
Republican	Larry Crowder (incumbent)	38,880	59.9
Democratic	Jim Casias	23,358	36.0
Libertarian	William Bartley	2,668	4.1
Total votes		64,906	100
Republican hold			

=== 2012 ===
2012 Colorado State Senate election, District 35
Party	Candidate	Votes	%
Republican	Larry Crowder	31,117	49.2
Democratic	Crestina Martinez	29,617	46.9
Libertarian	William Bartley	2,461	3.9
Total votes		63,195	100
Republican gain from new constituency			

=== Federal and statewide results ===
Year	Office	Results
2020	President	Trump 59.0 – 38.8%
2018	Governor	Stapleton 54.8 – 40.5%
2016	President	Trump 56.9 – 35.6%
2014	Senate	Gardner 55.4 – 37.7%
2014	Governor	Beauprez 53.9 – 40.5%
2012	President	Romney 52.0 – 45.5%
