= Colorado's 17th Senate district =

American legislative district

Colorado's 17th State Senate district
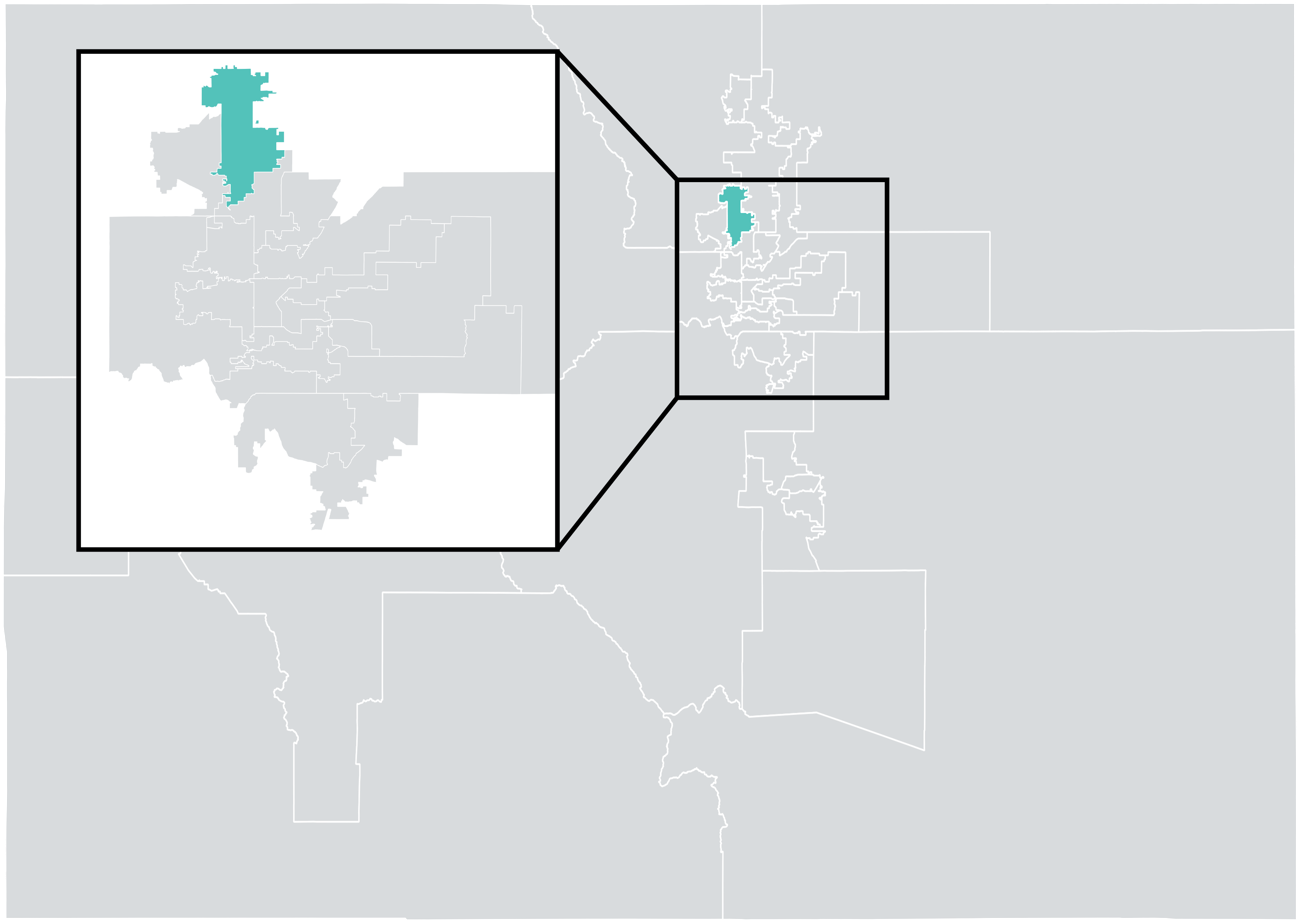
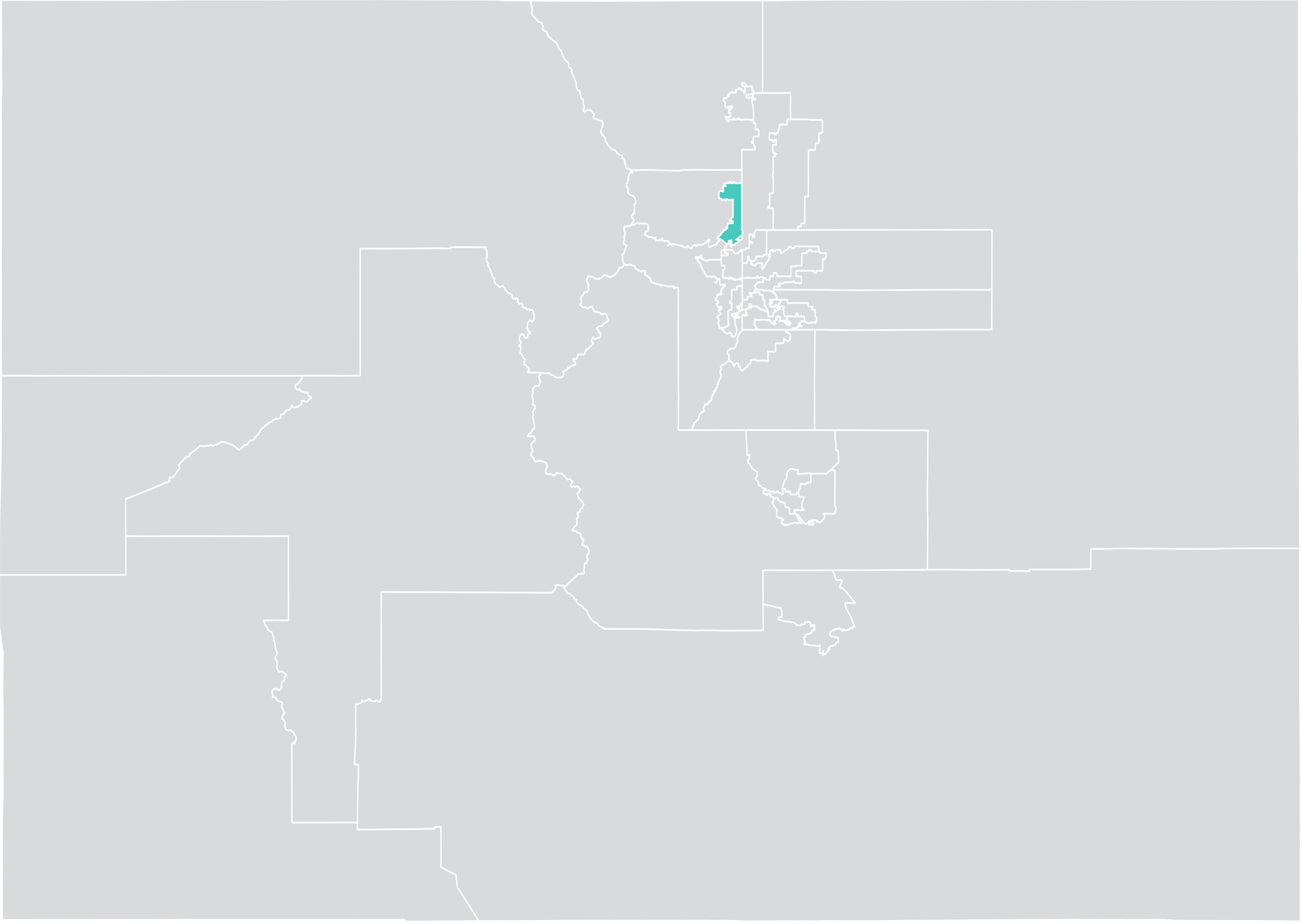
Senator
Katie Wallace; D–Longmont
- Registration: 32.2% Democratic; 14.9% Republican; 50.8% No party preference
- Demographics: 74% White; 1% Black; 19% Hispanic; 4% Asian; 2% Other
- Population (2018): 154,731
- Registered voters: 116,913

Colorado's 17th Senate district is one of 35 districts in the Colorado Senate. It was previously represented by Democrat Sonya Jaquez Lewis from 2021 until her resignation in 2025. Katie Wallace was selected to represent the district by vacancy committee in March 2025.

== Geography ==
District 17 is based in eastern Boulder County, southwestern Weld County, and northwestern Broomfield County, covering Lafayette, Longmont, and Erie.

The district is predominantly located in Colorado's 2nd congressional district, extends into a portion of the 7th congressional district, and overlaps with the 11th, 12th, 19th and 49th districts of the Colorado House of Representatives.

== Recent election results ==
Colorado state senators are elected to staggered four-year terms; under normal circumstances, the 17th district holds elections in presidential years.

=== 2020 ===
In 2018, Senator Matt Jones was elected to the Boulder County Board of County Commissioners, and then-State Rep. Mike Foote was chosen to replace him in the Senate. Foote chose not to seek a full term in 2020, however, and his successor in the State House, Sonya Jaquez Lewis, ran instead.

2020 Colorado State Senate election, District 17
Party	Candidate	Votes	%
Democratic	Sonya Jaquez Lewis	65,226	67.9
Republican	Matthew Menza	30,848	32.1
Total votes		96,093	100
Democratic hold			

=== 2016 ===
2016 Colorado State Senate election, District 17
Party	Candidate	Votes	%
Democratic	Matt Jones (incumbent)	57,649	100
Total votes		57,649	100
Democratic hold			

=== 2012 ===
2012 Colorado State Senate election, District 17
Party	Candidate	Votes	%
Democratic	Matt Jones	45,426	62.0
Republican	Charlie Plagainos	23,983	32.7
Libertarian	Ken Bray	3,848	5.3
Total votes		73,257	100
Democratic hold			

=== Federal and statewide results ===
Year	Office	Results
2020	President	Biden 71.2 – 26.2%
2018	Governor	Polis 68.2 – 28.5%
2016	President	Clinton 62.1 – 29.2%
2014	Senate	Udall 59.2 – 35.6%
2014	Governor	Hickenlooper 60.3 – 34.4%
2012	President	Obama 62.3 – 35.3%
