= 2022 United States Senate election in Colorado =

- November 8, 2022
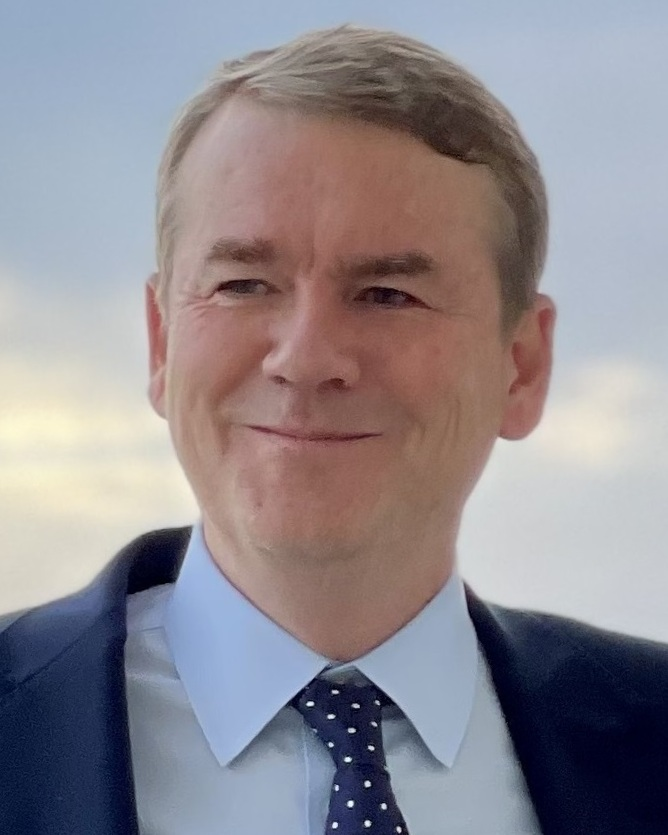

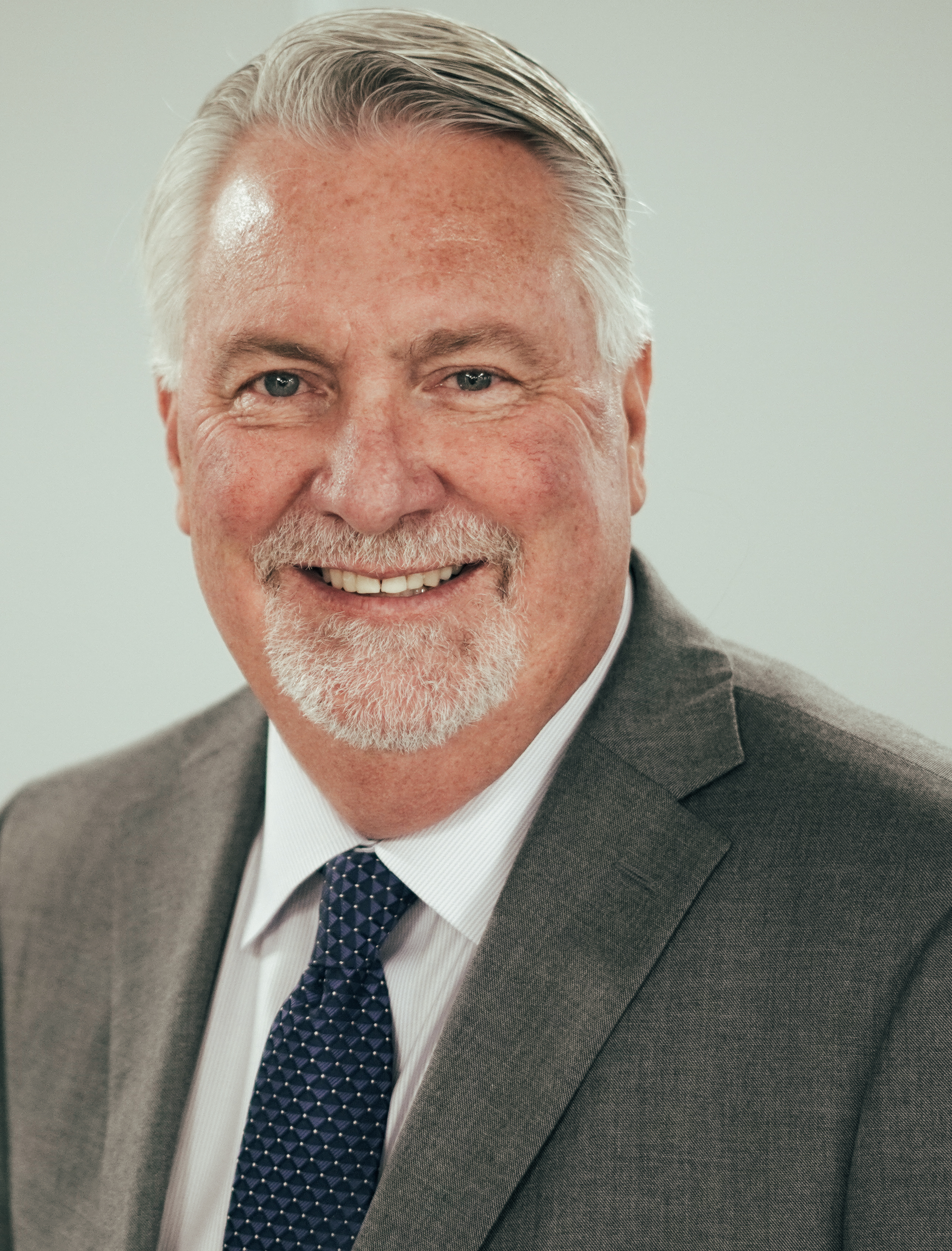
Nominee	Michael Bennet	Joe O'Dea
Party	Democratic	Republican
Popular vote	1,397,170	1,031,693
Percentage	55.88%	41.26%
- Bennet: 40–50% 50–60% 60–70% 70–80% 80–90% >90% O'Dea: 40–50% 50–60% 60–70% 70–80% 80–90% >90% Tie: 40–50% 50% No votes
U.S. senator before election
Michael Bennet
Democratic
Elected U.S. Senator
Michael Bennet
Democratic

The 2022 United States Senate election in Colorado was held on November 8, 2022. Incumbent Democratic Senator Michael Bennet was re-elected to a third term, defeating the Republican candidate, businessman Joe O'Dea. Originally appointed to the seat in 2009, Bennet won full terms in 2010 and 2016.

Bennet won by nearly 15 points, significantly outperforming his polling. His margin was the highest for a Democrat in a Senate election in Colorado since 1974. This was the first time in Bennet's Senate career that he received a majority of the vote.

== Democratic primary ==
=== Candidates ===
Bennet was appointed to the U.S. Senate in January 2009 by Governor Bill Ritter following the resignation of the incumbent Senator, Ken Salazar, who become the Secretary of the Interior under President Barack Obama. Bennet was then narrowly elected in 2010 for his first full term, defeating Representative Ken Buck with 48.08% of the vote. In the 2016 election, he was re-elected to a second term with 49.97% of the vote, defeating Republican El Paso County Commissioner Darryl Glenn.

Due to some of his centrist positions, such as his opposition to Medicare for All and his support for fracking, Bennet faced a potential challenge from the left, particularly from Joe Salazar, a former state representative. Salazar ultimately opted to run for the Colorado State Senate, and thus Bennet was easily renominated at the Democratic convention.

==== Nominee ====
- Michael Bennet, incumbent U.S. Senator

==== Eliminated at convention ====
- Karen Breslin, lawyer and university instructor

==== Declined ====
- Joe Salazar, former state representative and candidate for Colorado Attorney General in 2018 (ran for state senate)

=== Endorsements ===
Michael Bennet

Executive branch officials

- Dan Baer, former U.S. Ambassador to the OSCE (2013–2017) and candidate for the U.S. Senate in 2020
- Federico Peña, 12th U.S. Secretary of Transportation (1993–1997) and 8th United States Secretary of Energy (1997–1998)
- Ken Salazar, U.S. Ambassador to Mexico (2021–2025), 50th U.S. Secretary of the Interior (2009–2013), and former U.S. Senator from Colorado (2005–2009)

U.S. senators

- John Hickenlooper, U.S. Senator from Colorado (2021–present) and 42nd governor of Colorado (2011–2019)
- Mark Udall, former U.S. Senator from Colorado (2009–2015)
- Tim Wirth, former U.S. Senator from Colorado (1987–1993)

U.S. governors

- Jared Polis, 43rd Governor of Colorado (2019–present) and former U.S. Representative from Colorado's 2nd congressional district (2009–2019)
- Bill Ritter, 41st Governor of Colorado (2007–2011)
- Roy Romer, 39th Governor of Colorado (1987–1999)

U.S. representatives

- Betsy Markey, former U.S. Representative for Colorado's 4th congressional district (2009–2011)
- Joe Neguse, U.S. Representative for Colorado's 2nd congressional district (2019–present)
- Ed Perlmutter, former U.S. Representative for Colorado's 7th congressional district (2007–2023)
- John Salazar, former U.S. Representative for Colorado's 3rd congressional district (2005–2011)

State legislators

- Polly Baca, former state senator from the 25th district (1979–1987)

Organizations

- Council for a Livable World
- End Citizens United
- Feminist Majority PAC
- Giffords
- Jewish Dems
- League of Conservation Voters
- Let America Vote
- Natural Resources Defense Council
- Population Connection Action Fund
- Pro-Israel America

=== Results ===
Democratic primary results
Party	Candidate	Votes	%
Democratic	Michael Bennet (incumbent)	516,985	100.0%
Total votes		516,985	100.0%

== Republican primary ==
=== Candidates ===
Initially, a wide field of candidates declared their intention to seek the Republican nomination. However, instead of gathering the required number of signatures to be placed on the primary ballot, Bremer and most of the other candidates sought to earn the nomination by winning the required 30% of the delegate vote at the Colorado GOP convention in April 2022. As a result of the crowded field of candidates, delegate support was divided, with only State Representative Ron Hanks crossing the 30% threshold. Debora Flora, a radio show host, missed the ballot by a single percentage point, receiving 29% of the vote.

With the other candidates eliminated, State Representative Ron Hanks and construction CEO Joe O'Dea were the only two candidates on the primary ballot. The contrast between the two Republicans was stark. Hanks supported a complete ban on abortion and echoed former president Donald Trump's false assertions of widespread voter fraud in the 2020 presidential election, while the more moderate O'Dea expressed support for LGBTQ rights, some abortion rights, and rejected Trump's false claims of widespread voter fraud.

Though O'Dea was initially considered the frontrunner as a result of his fundraising advantage, Hanks was buoyed by an attempt by Democrats to influence the primary. Democratic Colorado, an entity formed in June 2022, received roughly $4 million from the Senate Majority Fund, a PAC associated with Senate Majority Leader Chuck Schumer. They ran ads characterizing Hanks as "too conservative", in order to elevate Hanks over O'Dea, who was perceived as a stronger general election candidate. This attempt to interfere in the GOP primary was denounced by numerous former Colorado Democratic officials, including former governor Roy Romer, and former senators Mark Udall, Tim Wirth, and Gary Hart, who previously mounted unsuccessful attempts to win the Democratic nomination for president in 1984 and 1988.

Despite the support from Democrats and his lobbying for the endorsement of Donald Trump, Hanks was defeated by O'Dea by a 9% margin. He performed best in rural parts of the state, while O'Dea was successful in urban areas, such as Denver.

==== Nominee ====
- Joe O'Dea, construction company owner

==== Eliminated in primary ====
- Ron Hanks, state representative for the 60th district (2021–2023) and nominee for California's 1st congressional district in 2010

==== Eliminated at convention ====
- Eli Bremer, Olympic athlete, U.S. Air Force major and former chair of the El Paso Republican Party
- Gino Campana, former Fort Collins council member, city developer
- Deborah Flora, former radio host
- Daniel Hendricks, small business owner
- Juli Henry, nonprofit founder
- Gregory J. Moore, Colorado Christian University professor
- Peter Yu, businessman and nominee for Colorado's 2nd congressional district in 2018

==== Withdrew ====
- Erik Aadland, Army veteran (became Republican nominee for Colorado's 7th congressional district)

==== Declined ====
- Ken Buck, U.S. representative for Colorado's 4th congressional district, chair of the Colorado Republican Party, and nominee for U.S. Senate in 2010
- Heidi Ganahl, university regent (ran for governor)
- Cory Gardner, former U.S. Senator (2015–2021)
- Darryl Glenn, former Colorado Springs city councilman (2005–2011), former El Paso County commissioner (2011–2019), and nominee for U.S. Senate in 2016 (ran for Mayor of Colorado Springs in 2023)
- Clarice Navarro, former state representative from the 47th district (2013–2017)
- Bill Owens, former governor (1999–2007)
- Steven Reams, Weld County sheriff (ran for re-election)

=== Endorsements ===
Erik Aadland (withdrawn)

U.S. representatives

- ~~Tom Tancredo, U.S. Representative for Colorado's 6th congressional district (1999–2009)~~ (switched endorsement to Campana after Aadland withdrew)
Eli Bremer (eliminated)

Executive branch officials

- Robert C. O'Brien, 27th U.S. National Security Advisor (2019–2021)

U.S. senators

- ~~Ben Nighthorse Campbell, former U.S. Senator from Colorado (1993–2005)~~ (switched endorsement to O’Dea after Bremer was eliminated)

U.S. representatives

- Jim Banks, U.S. Senator for Indiana (2025-present), U.S. Representative for Indiana's 3rd congressional district (2017–2025)
- Mike Garcia, U.S. Representative for California's 25th congressional district (2020–2025)
- Doug Lamborn, U.S. Representative for Colorado's 5th congressional district (2007–2025)
- August Pfluger, U.S. Representative for Texas's 11th congressional district (2021–present)

State legislators

- Mark Barker, former state representative for the 17th district (2021–2013)
- Tom Blickensderfer, former majority leader of the Colorado Senate
- Mary Bradfield, state representative for the 21st district (2021–present)
- ~~Greg Brophy, former state senator from the 1st district (2005–2015)~~ (switched endorsement to O'Dea after Bremer was eliminated)
- Larry Crowder, former state senator from the 35th district (2013–2021)
- Tim Dore, former state representative for the 64th district (2013–2017)
- ~~Kevin Grantham, former president of the Colorado Senate~~ (switched endorsement to O'Dea after Bremer was eliminated)
- Bernie Herpin, former state senator from the 11th district (2013–2015)
- Ed Jones, former state senator from the 11th district (2003–2007)
- Keith King, former state senator from the 12th district (2009–2013)
- Lois Landgraf, former state representative for the 21st district (2013–2021)
- Larry Liston, state senator from the 10th district (2021–present)
- Andy McElhany, former minority leader of the Colorado Senate
- Amy Stephens, former majority leader of the Colorado House of Representatives
- Mark Waller, former minority leader of the Colorado House of Representatives
- Jim Wilson, former state representative for the 60th district (2013–2021)

County officials

- 71 county commissioners
Gino Campana (eliminated)

Executive branch officials

- ~~David Bernhardt, 53rd United States Secretary of the Interior (2019–2021)~~ (switched endorsement to O'Dea after Campana was eliminated)
- Peter Brown, 9th U.S. Homeland Security Advisor (2019–2021)
- Kellyanne Conway, former Senior Counselor to the President (2017–2020)

U.S. representatives

- Bob Schaffer, former U.S. Representative for Colorado's 4th congressional district (1997–2003)
- Tom Tancredo, former U.S. Representative for Colorado's 6th congressional district (1999–2009) (previously endorsed Aadland)
Deborah Flora (eliminated)

U.S. senators

- Ted Cruz, U.S. Senator from Texas (2013–present)

State officials

- Jane Norton, 46th lieutenant governor of Colorado (2003–2007)

U.S. representatives

- Allen West, former U.S. Representative for Florida's 22nd congressional district (2011–2013) and candidate for Governor of Texas in 2022
Joe O'Dea

U.S. Executive Branch officials

- John Bolton, United States National Security Advisor (2018–2019), United States Ambassador to the United Nations (2005–2006)

U.S. senators

- Ben Nighthorse Campbell, former U.S. Senator from Colorado (1993–2005) (previously endorsed Bremer)

Federal officials

- David Bernhardt, 53rd U.S. Secretary of the Interior (2019–2021) (previously endorsed Campana)
- Jason R. Dunn, former U.S. Attorney for the District of Colorado (2018–2021)
- Gale Norton, 48th U.S. Secretary of the Interior (2001–2006) and 35th Colorado Attorney General (1991–1999)

Statewide officials

- Mark Hillman, 53rd Colorado State Treasurer (2005–2006)
- Bill Owens, 40th Governor of Colorado (1999–2007)

State legislators

- Greg Brophy, former state senator from the 1st district (2005–2015) (previously endorsed Bremer)
- John Cooke, state senator from the 13th district
- Kevin Grantham, Fremont County commissioner, former President of the Colorado Senate (2017–2019) (previously endorsed Bremer)
- Owen Hill, former state senator from the 10th district (2013–2021)
- Polly Lawrence, former state representative from the 39th district (2013–2019)
- Bob Rankin, state senator from the 8th district (2019–2023) and state representative from the 57th district (2013–2019)
- Ray Scott, state senator from the 7th district (2015–2023) and state representative from the 55th district (2013–2015)
- Jim Smallwood, former state senator from the 4th district
- Jerry Sonnenberg, state senator from the 1st district (2015–2023) and former President pro tempore of the Colorado Senate (2017–2019)
- Libby Szabo, former state representative from the 27th district (2011–2015)
- Rob Witwer, former state representative from the 25th district (2005–2009)
- Rob Woodward, former state senator from the 15th district

Local officials

- 4 county commissioners

Individuals

- Jon Caldara, president of the Independence Institute

Newspapers

- The Gazette

=== Polling ===
Poll source	Date(s) administered	Sample size (Note: Key: A – all adults RV – registered voters LV – likely voters V – unclear)	Margin of error	Ron Hanks	Joe O'Dea	Undecided
Public Opinion Strategies (R) (Note: This poll was sponsored by O'Dea's campaign)	May 15–20, 2022	400 (LV)	± 6.0%	14%	38%	47%

=== Results ===
Results by county: O'Dea: 50–60%; 60–70%; Hanks: 50–60%; 60–70%

Republican primary results
Party	Candidate	Votes	%
Republican	Joe O'Dea	345,060	54.44%
Republican	Ron Hanks	288,483	45.51%
Republican	Daniel Hendricks (write-in)	302	0.05%
Total votes		633,845	100.0%

== General election ==
In recent years, Colorado has started voting more Democratic in the federal level, transitioning from a purple state to a moderately (and increasingly strongly) blue state, and the shift was largely contributed to the left-wing shift in the growing Denver metropolitan area, with President Joe Biden winning the state by 13.5% in the 2020 election, almost nine points to the left of the national result of around 4.9%. Prevailing in 2010, a year where Colorado was considered a swing state and Democrats performed very poorly, Bennet had a generally strong electoral history. He also outperformed Hillary Clinton on the same ballot in 2016. Ahead of 2022, Bennet was generally favored to win, though polling showed him as potentially vulnerable, largely due to the state of the economy and President Biden's low approval ratings. Colorado had not elected a Republican to the U.S. Senate since Cory Gardner in 2014, another very strong year for Republicans nationwide and while Colorado was still considered a swing state, even then Gardner only won narrowly. Bennet ultimately won reelection by a comfortable 14.6 point margin, outperforming Biden's victory two years prior and his own polling averages. Bennet also flipped three counties he had lost in his 2016 re-election bid, flipping Grand County by a narrow 1.1% and Chaffee County, and Garfield County by wide margins. However, O'Dea did narrowly flip Conejos County by a slim 1%.

=== Predictions ===
Source	Ranking	As of
The Cook Political Report	Lean D	August 18, 2022
Inside Elections	Likely D	June 29, 2022
Sabato's Crystal Ball	Likely D	March 1, 2022
Politico	Lean D	August 12, 2022
RCP	Tossup	November 4, 2022
Fox News	Lean D	May 12, 2022
DDHQ	Likely D	July 20, 2022
538	Likely D	August 18, 2022
The Economist	Likely D	September 7, 2022

=== Endorsements ===
Michael Bennet (D)

Executive branch officials

- Dan Baer, United States Ambassador to the OSCE (2013–2017) and candidate for U.S. Senate in 2020
- Federico Peña, 12th United States Secretary of Transportation (1993–1997) and 8th United States Secretary of Energy (1997–1998)
- Ken Salazar, United States Ambassador to Mexico (2021–2025), 50th United States Secretary of the Interior (2009–2013), U.S. Senator from Colorado (2005–2009)

U.S. senators

- Cory Booker, U.S. Senator from New Jersey (2013–present), and Mayor of Newark (2006–2013)
- John Hickenlooper, U.S. Senator from Colorado (2021–present), 42nd governor of Colorado (2011–2019), and 43rd mayor of Denver (2003–2011)
- Alex Padilla, U.S. Senator from California (2021–present)
- Mark Udall, U.S. Senator from Colorado (2009–2015), U.S. Representative from Colorado's 2nd congressional district (1999–2009)
- Tim Wirth, U.S. Senator from Colorado (1987–1993), U.S. Representative from Colorado's 2nd congressional district (1975–1987)

U.S. governors

- Jared Polis, 43rd governor of Colorado (2019–present), U.S. Representative from Colorado's 2nd congressional district (2009–2019)
- Bill Ritter, 41st governor of Colorado (2007–2011)
- Roy Romer, 39th governor of Colorado (1987–1999)

U.S. representatives

- Betsy Markey, U.S. Representative from Colorado's 4th congressional district (2009–2011)
- Joe Neguse, U.S. Representative from Colorado's 2nd congressional district (2019–present)
- Ed Perlmutter, U.S. Representative from Colorado's 7th congressional district (2007–2023)
- John Salazar, U.S. Representative from Colorado's 3rd congressional district (2005–2011)

State legislators

- Polly Baca, former state senator from the 25th district (1979–1987) and former state representative from the 34th district (1974–1979)

Labor unions

- National Education Association
- United Mine Workers

Organizations

- American Israel Public Affairs Committee
- Council for a Livable World
- End Citizens United
- Feminist Majority PAC
- Giffords
- Jewish Dems
- League of Conservation Voters
- Let America Vote
- Natural Resources Defense Council
- Planned Parenthood Action Fund
- Population Connection Action Fund
- Pro-Israel America
- Sierra Club

Newspapers

- Aspen Daily News
- The Denver Post
Joe O'Dea (R)

U.S. presidents

- George W. Bush, 43rd president of the United States (2001–2009)

Executive branch officials

- David Bernhardt, 53rd U.S. Secretary of the Interior (2019–2021)
- John Bolton, United States National Security Advisor (2018–2019), United States Ambassador to the United Nations (2005–2006)
- Jason Dunn, former U.S. Attorney for the District of Colorado (2018–2021)
- Nikki Haley, 29th U.S. Ambassador to the United Nations (2017–2019) and 116th governor of South Carolina (2011–2017)
- Gale Norton, 48th U.S. Secretary of the Interior (2001–2006) and 35th Colorado Attorney General (1991–1999)

U.S. senators

- Hank Brown, former U.S. Senator from Colorado (1991–1997)
- Ben Nighthorse Campbell, former U.S. Senator from Colorado (1993–2005)
- John Cornyn, U.S. Senator from Texas (2002–present)
- Tom Cotton, U.S. Senator from Arkansas (2015–present)
- Cory Gardner, former U.S. Senator from Colorado (2015–2021)
- Mitch McConnell, U.S. Senator from Kentucky (1985–present) and Senate Minority Leader (2021–2025)
- Rick Scott, U.S. Senator from Florida (2019–present) and former governor of Florida (2011–2019)
- Tim Scott, U.S. Senator from South Carolina (2013–present)

U.S. representatives

- Mike Coffman, mayor of Aurora (2019–present), former U.S. Representative for Colorado's 6th congressional district (2009–2019)

Statewide officials

- Chris Christie, 55th governor of New Jersey (2010–2018)
- Ron DeSantis, 46th governor of Florida (2019–present)
- Mark Hillman, 53rd Colorado State Treasurer (2005–2006)
- Larry Hogan, 62nd governor of Maryland (2015–2023)
- Bill Owens, 40th governor of Colorado (1999–2007)
- John Suthers, Mayor of Colorado Springs (2015–2023), former Colorado Attorney General (2005–2015)

State legislators

- Greg Brophy, former state senator from the 1st district (2005–2015)
- John Cooke, former state senator from the 13th district
- Kevin Grantham, Fremont County commissioner, former President of the Colorado Senate (2017–2019)
- Owen Hill, former state senator from the 10th district (2013–2021)
- Polly Lawrence, former state representative from the 39th district (2013–2019)
- Bob Rankin, state senator from the 8th district (2019–2023)
- Ray Scott, state senator from the 7th district (2015–2023)
- Jim Smallwood, former state senator from the 4th district
- Jerry Sonnenberg, state senator from the 1st district (2015–2023) and former President pro tempore of the Colorado Senate (2017–2019)
- Libby Szabo, former state representative from the 27th district (2011–2015)
- Rob Witwer, former state representative from the 25th district (2005–2009)
- Rob Woodward, former state senator from the 15th district

Local officials

- 4 county commissioners
- 20 current and former mayors

Individuals

- Jon Caldara, president of the Independence Institute

Newspapers

- The Gazette
Brian Peotter (L)

State legislators

- Ron Hanks, state representative from the 60th district (2021–2023) and candidate for U.S. Senate in 2022 (Republican)
Declined to endorse

U.S. presidents

- Donald Trump, 45th president of the United States (2017–2021) (Republican)

=== Polling ===
Aggregate polls

Source of poll aggregation	Dates administered	Dates updated	Michael Bennet (D)	Joe O'Dea (R)	Undecided (Note: Calculated by taking the difference of 100% and all other candidates combined.)	Margin
Real Clear Politics	October 26 – November 5, 2022	November 7, 2022	50.0%	44.3%	5.7%	Bennet +5.7
FiveThirtyEight	July 26 – November 7, 2022	November 7, 2022	51.3%	42.9%	5.8%	Bennet +8.4
270towin	November 1–7, 2022	November 7, 2022	51.0%	43.4%	6.6%	Bennet +6.6
Average			50.8%	43.5%	5.7%	Bennet +7.3

Poll source	Date(s) administered	Sample size	Margin of error	Michael Bennet (D)	Joe O'Dea (R)	Brian Peotter (L)	Other	Undecided
co/efficient (R)	November 3–7, 2022	856 (LV)	± 3.3%	51%	43%	–	3% (Note: "Someone else" with 3%)	3%
Data for Progress (D)	November 2–5, 2022	1,983 (LV)	± 2.0%	51%	44%	2%	2% (Note: "Another candidate" with 2%)	–
The Trafalgar Group (R)	October 30 – November 1, 2022	1,084 (LV)	± 2.9%	48%	46%	2%	1%	3%
Emerson College	October 26–29, 2022	1,000 (LV)	± 3.0%	49%	42%	2%	3% (Note: Atwood (AV) with 1%; Cole (U) with 1%; "Someone else" with 1%)	5%
Emerson College	October 26–29, 2022	1,000 (LV)	± 3.0%	51%	43%	2%	3% (Note: "Someone else" with 2%; Atwood (AV) with 1%; Cole (U) with 1%)	–
co/efficient (R)	October 24–25, 2022	826 (LV)	± 3.4%	50%	34%	–	6% (Note: "Someone else" with 6%)	10%
CU Boulder/YouGov	October 11–19, 2022	709 (LV)	± 4.4%	56%	42%	–	2% (Note: "Other" with 2%)	–
Civiqs	October 15–18, 2022	600 (LV)	± 5.0%	54%	41%	–	2% (Note: "Someone else" with 2%)	3%
Global Strategy Group (D) (Note: This poll was sponsored by ProgressNow Colorado, a liberal nonprofit organization.)	October 6–11, 2022	800 (LV)	± 3.5%	49%	38%	7%	–	7%
Global Strategy Group (D)	October 6–11, 2022	800 (LV)	± 3.5%	52%	42%	–	–	6%
Marist College	October 3–6, 2022	1,127 (RV)	± 4.7%	48%	41%	–	2% (Note: "Another party's candidate" with 2%)	9%
Marist College	October 3–6, 2022	983 (LV)	± 5.0%	49%	43%	–	2% (Note: "Another party's candidate" with 2%)	7%
Data for Progress (D)	October 3–6, 2022	1,005 (LV)	± 3.0%	50%	41%	3%	1% (Note: "Another candidate" with 1%)	5%
OnMessage Inc. (R) (Note: This poll was sponsored by the Senate Opportunity Fund)	September 20–27, 2022	600 (LV)	± 4.0%	46%	45%	–	4% (Note: "Someone else" with 4%)	5%
Keating Research/Magellan Strategies	September 18–26, 2022	1,060 (LV)	± 3.0%	46%	36%	–	–	18%
The Trafalgar Group (R)	September 20–24, 2022	1,078 (LV)	± 2.9%	49%	43%	4%	<1% (Note: "Other" with 0%)	5%
Emerson College	September 18–19, 2022	1,000 (LV)	± 3.0%	46%	36%	–	4% (Note: "Someone else" with 4%)	14%
Public Policy Polling (D)	August 30–31, 2022	782 (V)	± 3.5%	46%	35%	7%	–	12%
The Tarrance Group (R) (Note: This poll was sponsored by the Republican Attorneys General Association)	August 22–25, 2022	600 (LV)	± 4.1%	48%	47%	–	–	5%
The Trafalgar Group (R)	August 15–19, 2022	1,087 (LV)	± 2.9%	47%	42%	5%	1%	5%
McLaughlin & Associates (R)	July 24–26, 2022	500 (LV)	± 4.4%	48%	40%	–	–	12%
Global Strategy Group (D)	June 2–8, 2022	400 (RV)	± 4.9%	49%	36%	–	–	14%

Hypothetical polling

Michael Bennet vs. Ron Hanks

Poll source	Date(s) administered	Sample size	Margin of error	Michael Bennet (D)	Ron Hanks (R)	Undecided
Global Strategy Group (D)	June 2–8, 2022	400 (RV)	± 4.9%	50%	37%	13%
Global Strategy Group (D)	October 19–24, 2021	400 (RV)	± 4.9%	52%	34%	13%

Michael Bennet vs. Eli Bremer

Poll source	Date(s) administered	Sample size	Margin of error	Michael Bennet (D)	Eli Bremer (R)	Undecided
Global Strategy Group (D)	October 19–24, 2021	400 (RV)	± 4.9%	48%	35%	17%
co/efficient (R) (Note: This poll was sponsored by Bremer's campaign)	September 9–12, 2021	742 (LV)	± 3.6%	40%	32%	22%

Michael Bennet vs. Gino Campana

Poll source	Date(s) administered	Sample size	Margin of error	Michael Bennet (D)	Gino Campana (R)	Undecided
Blueprint Polling (D)	April 6–8, 2022	612 (V)	± 4.0%	46%	40%	14%

Michael Bennet vs. Lauren Boebert

Poll source	Date(s) administered	Sample size	Margin of error	Michael Bennet (D)	Lauren Boebert (R)	Undecided
Global Strategy Group (D)	June 17–23, 2021	800 (RV)	± 3.5%	51%	38%	11%

Michael Bennet vs. generic Republican

Poll source	Date(s) administered	Sample size	Margin of error	Michael Bennet (D)	Generic Republican	Undecided
Global Strategy Group (D)	June 2–8, 2022	800 (RV)	± 3.4%	49%	37%	14%
Cygnal (R) (Note: This poll was sponsored by Ready Colorado)	January 12–13, 2022	630 (LV)	± 3.9%	45%	46%	9%
Global Strategy Group (D)	June 17–23, 2021	800 (RV)	± 3.5%	48%	40%	12%

Michael Bennet vs. generic opponent

Poll source	Date(s) administered	Sample size	Margin of error	Michael Bennet (D)	Generic Opponent	Undecided
McLaughlin & Associates (R)	July 24–26, 2022	500 (LV)	± 4.4%	44%	42%	14%

Generic Democrat vs. generic Republican

Poll source	Date(s) administered	Sample size	Margin of error	Generic Democrat	Generic Republican	Undecided
co/efficient (R)	September 9–12, 2021	742 (LV)	± 3.6%	44%	42%	14%

=== Debates ===
2022 United States Senate general election in Colorado debates
No.	Date	Host	Moderator	Link	Democratic	Republican
Key: P Participant A Absent N Non-invitee I Invitee W Withdrawn						
Key: P Participant A Absent N Non-invitee I Invitee W Withdrawn					Michael Bennet	Joe O'Dea
1	Oct. 28, 2022	Colorado State University			P	P

=== Results ===
2022 United States Senate election in Colorado
Party	Candidate	Votes	%	±%
Democratic	Michael Bennet (incumbent)	1,397,170	55.88%	+5.91%
Republican	Joe O'Dea	1,031,693	41.26%	−3.05%
Libertarian	Brian Peotter	43,534	1.74%	−1.88%
Unity	T.J. Cole	16,379	0.66%	+0.32%
Approval Voting	Frank Atwood	11,354	0.45%	N/A
Write-in		71	0.00%	N/A
Total votes		2,500,201	100.00%	N/A
Democratic hold				

==== By county ====
County	Michael Bennet Democratic		Joe O'Dea Republican		Various candidates Other parties		Margin		Total votes cast
County	#	%	#	%	#	%	#	%	Total votes cast
Adams	90,483	56.8%	63,586	39.9%	5,218	3.3%	26,897	16.9%	159,287
Alamosa	2,999	50.6%	2,734	46.1%	196	3.5%	265	4.5%	5,929
Arapahoe	154,678	60.1%	96,033	37.3%	6,606	2.6%	58,645	22.8%	257,317
Archuleta	3,428	43.8%	4,099	52.4%	293	3.7%	-671	-8.6%	7,820
Baca	371	21.3%	1,303	74.7%	71	4.1%	-464	-53.4%	1,810
Bent	640	35.4%	1,104	61.0%	66	3.7%	-464	-25.6%	1,810
Boulder	128,227	77.5%	33,858	20.5%	3,343	2.1%	94,369	57.0%	165,428
Broomfield	23,617	62.9%	12,975	34.6%	950	2.6%	10,642	28.3%	37,542
Chaffee	6,607	56.0%	4,854	41.1%	339	2.8%	1,753	14.9%	11,800
Cheyenne	120	13.1%	763	83.2%	34	3.8%	-643	-70.1%	917
Clear Creek	2,966	57.2%	2,040	39.4%	175	3.4%	926	17.8%	5,181
Conejos	1,669	48.4%	1,704	49.4%	74	2.1%	-35	-1.0%	3,447
Costilla	1,108	65.7%	518	30.7%	60	3.5%	590	35.0%	1,686
Crowley	432	31.4%	849	61.7%	94	6.8%	-417	-30.3%	1,375
Custer	1,061	31.9%	2,112	63.5%	155	4.7%	-1,051	-31.6%	3,328
Delta	5,400	33.9%	9,901	62.2%	613	3.8%	-4,501	-28.3%	15,914
Denver	228,419	80.1%	51,582	18.1%	5,127	1.8%	176,837	62.0%	285,128
Dolores	353	27.5%	873	67.9%	59	4.5%	-520	-40.4%	1,285
Douglas	85,173	44.6%	100,978	52.9%	4,757	2.6%	-15,805	-8.3%	190,908
Eagle	13,960	62.9%	7,776	35.0%	457	2.1%	6,184	27.9%	22,193
El Paso	124,024	43.6%	149,995	52.8%	10,295	3.6%	-25,971	-9.2%	284,314
Elbert	3,824	23.5%	11,897	73.2%	533	3.3%	-8,073	-49.7%	16,254
Fremont	6,802	34.0%	12,285	61.5%	901	4.5%	-5,483	-27.5%	19,988
Garfield	12,777	52.1%	10,924	44.6%	814	3.3%	1,853	7.5%	24,515
Gilpin	1,914	56.1%	1,385	40.6%	115	3.4%	529	15.5%	3,414
Grand	3,912	49.0%	3,824	47.9%	249	3.1%	88	1.1%	7,985
Gunnison	5,993	65.4%	2,905	31.7%	266	2.9%	3,088	33.7%	9,164
Hinsdale	223	43.1%	272	52.6%	22	4.3%	-49	-8.5%	517
Huerfano	2,011	52.2%	1,705	44.3%	134	3.5%	306	7.9%	3,850
Jackson	151	22.0%	496	72.4%	38	5.6%	-345	-50.4%	685
Jefferson	176,378	58.7%	115,978	38.6%	8,000	2.6%	60,400	20.1%	300,356
Kiowa	120	16.0%	602	80.4%	27	3.6%	-482	-64.4%	749
Kit Carson	531	17.5%	2,408	79.5%	89	3.0%	-1,877	-62.0%	3,028
La Plata	17,711	59.6%	11,231	37.8%	787	2.7%	6,480	21.8%	29,729
Lake	1,812	60.5%	1,067	35.6%	116	3.9%	745	24.9%	2,995
Larimer	100,466	57.3%	69,573	39.7%	5,239	3.0%	30,893	17.6%	175,278
Las Animas	3,291	49.3%	3,166	47.4%	216	3.2%	125	1.9%	6,673
Lincoln	401	19.0%	1,624	77.1%	81	3.9%	-1,223	-58.1%	2,106
Logan	1,954	23.6%	5,980	72.4%	329	4.0%	-4,026	-48.8%	8,263
Mesa	28,732	39.1%	41,766	56.9%	2,937	4.0%	-13,034	-17.8%	73,435
Mineral	310	43.7%	369	52.0%	30	4.3%	-59	-8.3%	709
Moffat	1,069	19.8%	4,150	76.9%	178	3.3%	-3,081	-57.1%	5,397
Montezuma	5,072	40.5%	6,960	55.6%	477	3.9%	-1,888	-15.1%	12,509
Montrose	7,255	34.8%	12,894	61.9%	681	3.2%	-5,639	-27.1%	20,830
Morgan	2,786	27.4%	7,000	68.8%	383	3.8%	-4,214	-41.4%	10,169
Otero	3,052	42.2%	3,958	54.7%	226	3.1%	-906	-12.5%	7,236
Ouray	2,160	60.6%	1,327	37.2%	79	2.2%	833	23.4%	3,566
Park	4,234	42.2%	5,390	53.7%	419	4.1%	-1,156	-11.5%	10,043
Phillips	400	20.2%	1,503	75.9%	78	3.9%	-1,103	-55.7%	1,981
Pitkin	7,157	74.7%	2,281	23.8%	143	1.5%	4,876	50.9%	9,581
Prowers	1,172	27.4%	2,956	69.1%	149	3.5%	-1,784	-41.7%	4,277
Pueblo	35,581	52.8%	29,453	43.8%	2,275	3.3%	6,088	9.0%	67,349
Rio Blanco	525	17.4%	2,391	79.1%	105	3.4%	-1,866	-61.7%	3,021
Rio Grande	2,136	43.2%	2,625	53.1%	183	3.7%	-489	-9.9%	4,944
Routt	8,737	63.0%	4,836	34.9%	294	2.2%	3,901	28.1%	13,867
Saguache	1,577	56.9%	1,070	38.6%	124	4.4%	507	18.3%	2,771
San Juan	350	65.1%	164	30.5%	24	4.4%	186	34.6%	538
San Miguel	3,110	76.2%	888	21.7%	85	2.1%	2,222	54.5%	4,083
Sedgwick	308	26.5%	807	69.4%	47	4.1%	-499	-42.9%	1,162
Summit	9,710	68.2%	4,211	29.6%	322	2.3%	5,499	36.6%	14,243
Teller	4,515	33.3%	8,602	63.5%	440	3.2%	-4,087	-30.2%	13,557
Washington	347	14.4%	1,964	81.8%	91	3.8%	-1,617	-67.4%	2,402
Weld	50,129	39.0%	74,043	57.6%	4,418	3.4%	-23,914	-18.6%	128,590
Yuma	740	18.7%	3,086	77.8%	141	3.5%	-2,346	-59.1%	3,967
Totals	1,397,170	55.9%	1,031,693	41.3%	71,267	2.9%	365,477	14.6%	2,500,130

Counties that flipped from Democratic to Republican

- Conejos (largest city: Manassa)

Counties that flipped from Republican to Democratic

- Chaffee (largest city: Salida)
- Garfield (largest city: Rifle)
- Grand (largest city: Granby)

==== By congressional district ====
Bennet won five of eight congressional districts.

District	Bennet	O'Dea	Representative
1st	80%	18%	Diana DeGette
2nd	69%	28%	Joe Neguse
3rd	48%	49%	Lauren Boebert
4th	40%	57%	Ken Buck
5th	44%	52%	Doug Lamborn
6th	60%	38%	Jason Crow
7th	57%	40%	Ed Perlmutter (117th Congress)
7th	57%	40%	Brittany Pettersen (118th Congress)
8th	50%	46%	Yadira Caraveo

== See also ==
- 2022 United States Senate elections
- List of United States senators from Colorado

== Notes ==
Partisan clients
