= Colorado's 14th House of Representatives district =

American legislative district

Colorado's 14th State House of Representatives district
Representative
Vacant; R–Colorado Springs
- Registration: 36.9% Republican; 15.5% Democratic; 46% No party preference
- Demographics: 77.7% White; 3% Black; 10.5% Hispanic; 5.2% Asian; 0.6% Native American; 0.2% Hawaiian/Pacific Islander; 2.7% Other; 10.7% Multiracial
- Population (2020) • Voting age: 90,356; 68,705
- Registered voters (2022): 66,608

Colorado's 14th House of Representatives district is one of 65 districts in the Colorado House of Representatives. The district's current representative is Republican Ava Flanell, who was sworn in on October 11, 2025. Previously, it was represented by Republican Rose Pugliese from January 9, 2023 to September 15, 2025, when she resigned from the state house.

== Geography ==
District 14 covers part of the city of Colorado Springs in El Paso County.

The district overlaps with Colorado's 5th congressional district, and the 9th and 10th districts of the Colorado Senate.

== Recent election results ==
=== 2022 ===
2022 Colorado's 14th House of Representatives district Democratic primary
Party	Candidate	Votes	%
Democratic	Rob Rogers	6,322	100.00%
Total votes		6,322	100.00%

2022 Colorado's 14th House of Representatives district Republican primary
Party	Candidate	Votes	%
Republican	Rose Pugliese	8,898	53.57%
Republican	Joe Woyte	7,713	46.43%
Total votes		16,611	100.00%

2022 Colorado's 14th House of Representatives district general election
Party	Candidate	Votes	%
Republican	Rose Pugliese	27,250	60.67%
Democratic	Rob Rogers	17,665	39.33%
Total votes		44,915	100.00%
Republican hold			

=== 2020 ===
2020 Colorado's 14th House of Representatives district Democratic primary
Party	Candidate	Votes	%
Democratic	John Foley	8,855	100.00%
Total votes		8,855	100.00%

2020 Colorado's 14th House of Representatives district Republican primary
Party	Candidate	Votes	%
Republican	Shane Sandridge (incumbent)	14,366	100.00%
Total votes		14,366	100.00%

2020 Colorado's 14th House of Representatives district general election
Party	Candidate	Votes	%
Republican	Shane Sandridge (incumbent)	34,652	60.86%
Democratic	John Foley	19,688	35.23%
Libertarian	David A. Thompson	2,189	3.92%
Total votes		55,890	100.00%
Republican hold			

=== 2018 ===
2018 Colorado's 14th House of Representatives district Democratic primary
Party	Candidate	Votes	%
Democratic	Paul J. Haddick	4,320	100.00%
Total votes		4,320	100.00%

2018 Colorado's 14th House of Representatives district Republican primary
Party	Candidate	Votes	%
Republican	Shane Sandridge	7,903	61.76%
Republican	Kanda Calef	4,893	38.24%
Total votes		3,797	100.00%

2018 Colorado's 14th House of Representatives district general election
Party	Candidate	Votes	%
Republican	Shane Sandridge	27,765	68.47%
Democratic	Paul J. Haddick	12,787	31.53%
Total votes		40,552	100.00%
Republican hold			

=== 2016 ===
2016 Colorado's 14th House of Representatives district Republican primary
Party	Candidate	Votes	%
Republican	Dan Nordberg (incumbent)	8,247	100.00%
Total votes		8,247	100.00%

2016 Colorado's 14th House of Representatives district general election
Party	Candidate	Votes	%
Republican	Dan Nordberg (incumbent)	31,766	72.45%
Democratic	Chris Walters	12,077	27.55%
Total votes		43,843	100.00%
Republican hold			

=== 2014 ===
2014 Colorado's 14th House of Representatives district Democratic primary
Party	Candidate	Votes	%
Democratic	Glenn Carlson	1,377	100.00%
Total votes		1,377	100.00%

2014 Colorado's 14th House of Representatives district Republican primary
Party	Candidate	Votes	%
Republican	Dan Nordberg (incumbent)	7,889	100.00%
Total votes		7,889	100.00%

2014 Colorado's 14th House of Representatives district general election
Party	Candidate	Votes	%
Republican	Dan Nordberg (incumbent)	23,429	75.61%
Democratic	Glenn Carlson	7,558	24.39%
Total votes		30,987	100.00%
Republican hold			

=== 2012 ===
2012 Colorado's 14th House of Representatives district American Constitution Party primary
Party	Candidate	Votes	%
Constitution	Thomas O'Dell	8	100.00%
Total votes		8	100.00%

2012 Colorado's 14th House of Representatives district Republican primary
Party	Candidate	Votes	%
Republican	Dan Nordberg	7,442	100.00%
Total votes		7,442	100.00%

2012 Colorado's 14th House of Representatives district general election
Party	Candidate	Votes	%
Republican	Dan Nordberg	26,346	76.31%
Libertarian	R. David Lucero	5,828	16.88%
Constitution	Thomas O'Dell	2,351	6.81%
Total votes		34,525	100.00%
Republican hold			

=== 2010 ===
2010 Colorado's 14th House of Representatives Republican primary
Party	Candidate	Votes	%
Republican	Janak Joshi	6,618	100.00%
Total votes		6,618	100.00%

2010 Colorado's 14th House of Representatives general election
Party	Candidate	Votes	%
Republican	Janak Joshi	20,352	100.00%
Total votes		20,352	100.00%
Republican hold			

=== 2008 ===
2008 Colorado's 14th House of Representatives Democratic primary
Party	Candidate	Votes	%
Democratic	Chyrese Exline	1,191	100.00%
Total votes		1,191	100.00%

2008 Colorado's 14th House of Representatives Republican primary
Party	Candidate	Votes	%
Republican	Kent Lambert	6,865	100.00%
Total votes		6,865	100.00%

2008 Colorado's 14th House of Representatives general election
Party	Candidate	Votes	%
Republican	Kent Lambert (incumbent)	25,004	71.49%
Democratic	Chyrese Exline	9,972	28.51%
Total votes		34,976	100.00%
Republican hold			
