= Dragon man =

Dragon Man may refer to:

- Harbin cranium, nicknamed "Dragon Man", the skull of an archaic human from China
- Mel Bernstein, nicknamed "Dragon Man," an American firearms dealer
- Zduhać, also called dragon man, a legendary creature in Balkan folklore
- Dragon Men (Tokyo), Shunjuku, Tokyo, Japan

== Fiction ==
- Dragon Man (character), a supervillain in the Marvel Comics Universe
- The Dragon Man, a 1999 crime novel
- Dragon men, a fictional species from the Flash Gordon comic strip on the planet Mongo (fictional planet)

== See also ==
- Dragonborn (Dungeons & Dragons), a draconic humanoid species
- Dragon (disambiguation)
- Man (disambiguation)
