= Ron Hanks =

American politician

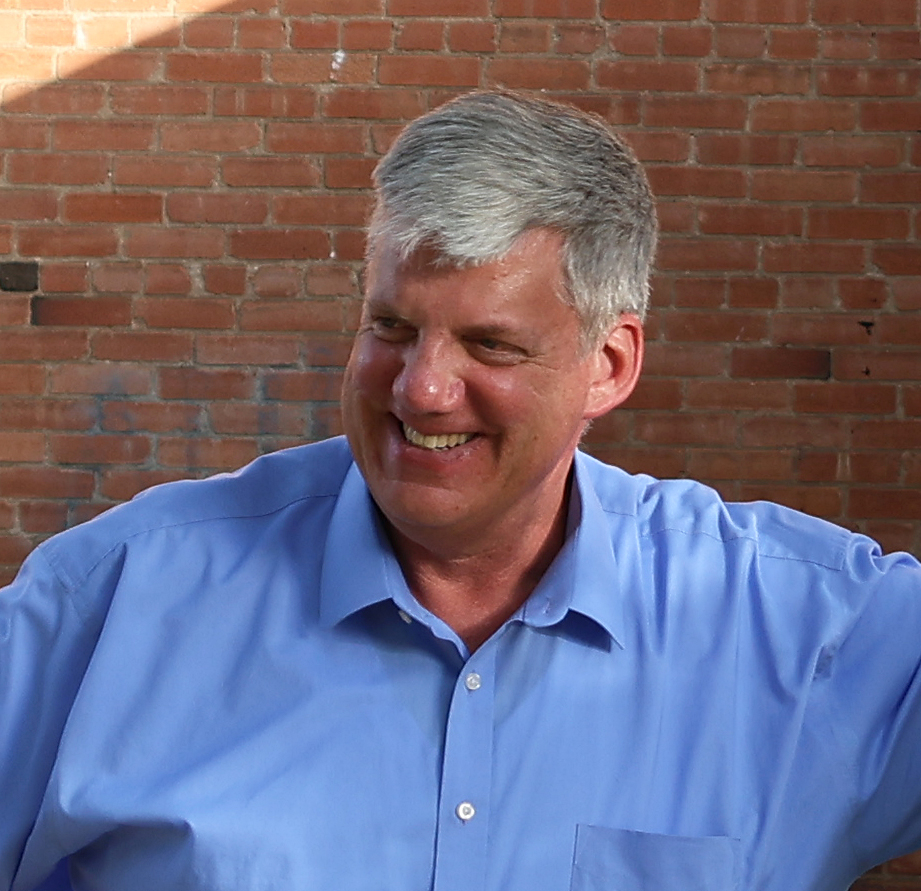
- Hanks in 2024

Member of the Colorado House of Representatives from the 60th district
- In office January 13, 2021 – January 9, 2023
- Preceded by: James Wilson
- Succeeded by: Redistricted

Personal details
- Born: Loren Lowell Hanks
- Party: Republican
- Education: University of Maryland, College Park (BA)
- Website: Campaign website

Loren Lowell "Ron" Hanks is an American politician and retired United States Air Force officer who served in the Colorado House of Representatives from 2021 to early 2023. A member of the Republican Party, Hanks represented District 60. Hanks ran for the U.S. Senate in a bid to challenge Michael Bennet in 2022 but lost in the primary. He was a candidate for Colorado's 3rd Congressional District in 2024, but was defeated by Jeff Hurd in the Republican primary.

== Career ==
Hanks served for 32 years (active and reserve) in the United States Air Force, and owns a company called The Western Surveyor. He enlisted in the Air Force in 1984, and after earning a bachelor's degree from the University of Maryland was commissioned. He worked as an Arab linguist and intelligence officer.

=== Politics ===
In 2010, Hanks ran unsuccessfully for Congress in California's 1st congressional district, located in Northern California. Hanks was later elected to the Colorado House of Representatives in the 2020 general election. In the June 2020 Republican House District 60 primary, he ran unopposed.

In the 2020 general election, Hanks won 62.41% of the total votes cast.

After Joe Biden defeated Donald Trump in the 2020 presidential election, Hanks questioned the election results and promoted false claims of voter fraud. Hanks attended the January 6 Trump rally at The Ellipse and marched with other rally-goers to the United States Capitol, saying that "people had already entered the building" by the time he arrived at a designated meeting area. In a fundraising newsletter, Hanks promoted disproven theories about Antifa plants attacking the Capitol on January 6 and the 2020 presidential election results being fraudulent.

In April 2021, Hanks was criticized Colorado Democrats for joking about lynching after being mistakenly introduced as Colorado representative Mike Lynch and saying the Three-Fifths Compromise that designated a slave as three-fifths of a person "was not impugning anybody’s humanity." Speaking on the compromise he said that it was intended to keep Southern states from expanding slavery. Hanks said his statements were manipulated to make a different point than he was.

In May 2021, Hanks allegedly threatened to assault Colorado House Minority Leader and fellow Republican Hugh McKean over a legislative disagreement.

In June 2021, Hanks visited Arizona to observe the controversial Arizona audit. The next month, Hanks participated in a conference hosted by MyPillow CEO Mike Lindell, known for promoting false claims of fraud in the 2020 presidential election.

In August 2021, Hanks attended a rally in Mesa County to support Tina Peters, a local Republican county clerk who was affiliated with groups promoting false claims of election fraud and was later arrested and indicted for seven felony charges related to election tampering and misconduct. Hanks said that the clerk was a "gold star mom and public servant. There is no evidence she did anything wrong". Hanks also accused the investigation of the clerk's office of being a "false-flag operation" despite a lack of evidence or substantiation of these claims.

On October 1, 2021, Hanks filed to run for the U.S. Senate in a bid to challenge Michael Bennet in 2022. However, in the 2022 Republican primary election for United States Senator from Colorado, Joe O'Dea defeated Hanks and one write-in candidate.

In December 2023, Hanks announced that he would run in 2024 for the open race in Colorado's 3rd congressional district after incumbent Congresswoman Lauren Boebert announced her plans to move and run in the open 4th district. Hanks was defeated in the Republican primary. He is running in the 2026 Republican primary in Colorado's 3rd congressional district.
