= Ty Winter =

American politician

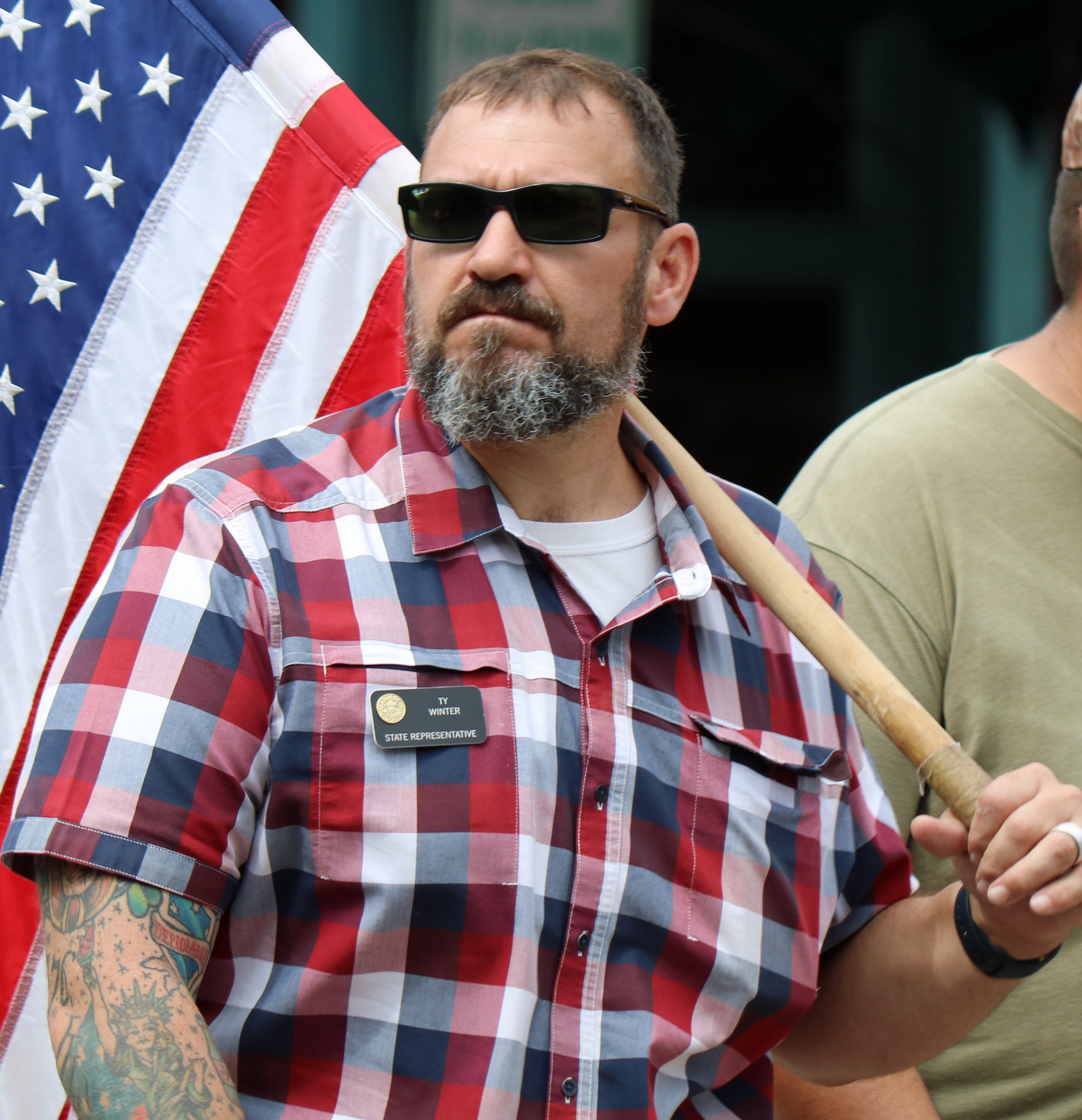
- Winter in 2023

Minority Leader of the Colorado House of Representatives
- Acting
- In office September 15, 2025 – September 20, 2025
- Preceded by: Rose Pugliese
- Succeeded by: Jarvis Caldwell

Member of the Colorado House of Representatives from the 47th district
- Incumbent
- Assumed office January 9, 2023
- Preceded by: Stephanie Luck

Personal details
- Born: 1978 or 1979 (age 47–48)
- Party: Republican
- Website: Campaign website

Ty Winter (born 1978/1979) is a state representative from Las Animas County, Colorado. A Republican, Winter represents Colorado House of Representatives District 47, which includes all of Baca, Bent, Crowley, Kiowa, Las Animas, Otero, and Prowers counties and parts of Huerfano and Pueblo counties in southern Colorado. Some of the cities and towns in the district are Pueblo West, Trinidad, Lamar, La Junta, and Rocky Ford.

== Background ==
Winter lives in Las Animas County and is a fourth-generation cattle rancher. He is also a business owner. From 2019 to 2022, he served as the chairman of his county's Republican party organization.

== Elections ==
=== 2022 ===
In the 2022 Colorado House of Representatives election, Winter defeated his Democratic Party opponent, winning 64.82% of the total votes cast.

=== 2024 ===
Winter ran for re-election in 2024. In the Republican primary election held June 25, 2024, he ran unopposed. In the general election held November 5, 2024, Winter defeated his Democratic Party opponent winning 58.64% of the vote.

== Assistant minority leader ==
Winter was elected assistant minority leader in January 2024 after Rose Pugliese, who previously held the position, was elected minority leader.

Colorado House of Representatives
Preceded by Rose Pugliese	Minority Leader of the Colorado House of Representatives; Acting; 2025	Succeeded by Jarvis Caldwell
