= Colorado's 20th House of Representatives district =

American legislative district

Colorado's 20th State House of Representatives district
Representative
Jarvis Caldwell; R–Monument
- Demographics: 78% White; 3% Black; 10% Hispanic; 2% Asian; 0% Native American; 6% Multiracial
- Population (2024): 94,005

Colorado's 20th House of Representatives district is one of 65 districts in the Colorado House of Representatives. It has been represented by Jarvis Caldwell since 2025.
