= Jarvis Caldwell =

American politician

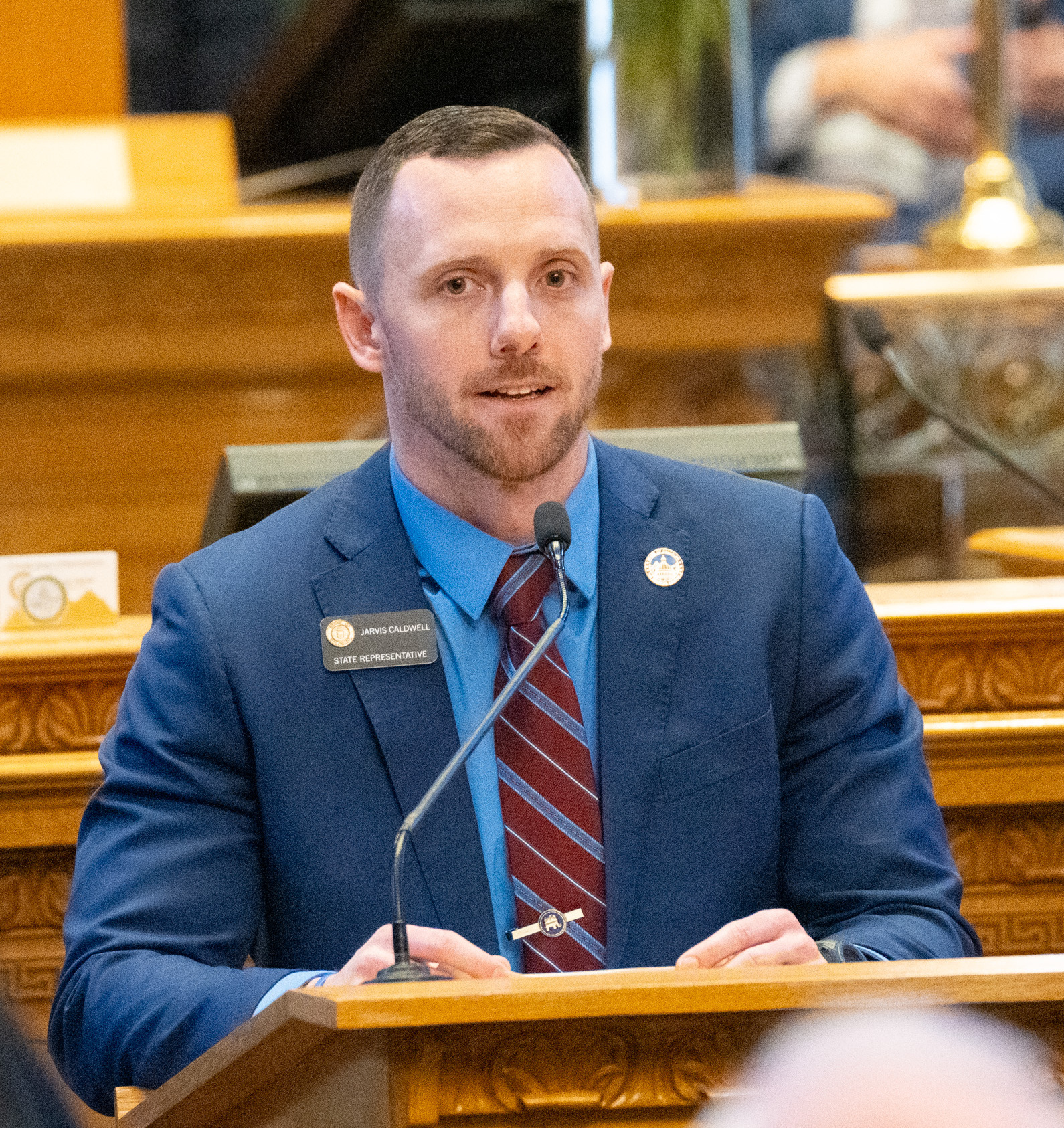

Minority Leader of the Colorado House of Representatives
- Incumbent
- Assumed office September 20, 2025
- Preceded by: Ty Winter (acting)

Member of the Colorado House of Representatives from the 20th district
- Incumbent
- Assumed office January 8, 2025
- Preceded by: Don Wilson

Personal details
- Born: Timothy Caldwell; 1988 or 1989 (age 36–37)
- Party: Republican
- Education: Air University (attended); American Military University (BA)
- Website: Campaign website

Jarvis Caldwell (born Timothy Caldwell on 1988/1989) is an American politician serving as a member of the Colorado House of Representatives from the 20th district, which includes a portion of unincorporated El Paso County and the communities of Air Force Academy, Black Forest, Gleneagle, Monument, Palmer Lake, and Woodmoor. In September 2025, he was elected Minority Leader of the body.

== Background ==
Caldwell was born in Florida and grew up in Kentucky. After high school, he joined the United States Air Force. He initially worked as an aircraft technician, working on maintaining F-15E aircraft. During his ten years in the Air Force, he was stationed and deployed in Afghanistan, Korea, and England. Later, he switched jobs in the Air Force and joined the JAG Corps, working as a paralegal in Washington, D.C. He and his family moved to Colorado Springs in 2019. Since then, he has worked as a legislative aide at the Colorado State House and has also worked as the communications director for the Colorado House Republicans. He also serves on the board of a local charter school.

== Political career ==
In the 2024 Republican Primary election for Colorado House of Representatives District 20, Caldwell defeated opponent Jason Lupo, winning 65.87% of the total votes cast.

In the general election, Caldwell defeated his Democratic Party opponent, winning 71.94% of the total votes cast.

Colorado House of Representatives
Preceded by Ty Winter; Acting	Minority Leader of the Colorado House of Representatives; 2025–present	Incumbent
