= Stephanie Vigil =

American politician

Member of the Colorado House of Representatives from the 16th district
- In office January 9, 2023 – January 8, 2025
- Preceded by: Andres G. Pico
- Succeeded by: Rebecca Keltie

Personal details
- Party: Democratic
- Occupation: Politician, gig worker

Stephanie Vigil (/viˈhɪl/) is an American politician who was a member of the Colorado House of Representatives from the 16th district, which is located in Colorado Springs and includes most or parts of Cragmor, Knob Hill, Old North End Historic District, Patty Jewett and the University of Colorado Colorado Springs. She was elected in 2022 and assumed office in January 2023. She was defeated for re-election in 2024 by Republican Rebecca Keltie by just 3 votes out of 40,000+ cast, the closest state legislature election of 2024. Vigil is running for re-election in 2026.

== Background ==
Vigil was born in Monroe, Michigan, and later moved to Colorado. Vigil is a community organizer and has been an essential worker for most of her life. She recently worked as a gig-working delivery driver for about five years.

== Political career ==
Vigil ran against Andres Pico in 2020 but ultimately lost to him in the general election. Her run for the seat in 2020 would later gain her recognition in the district. In the 2022 Colorado state house elections, Vigil defeated the Republican and Libertarian candidates with a plurality of the votes cast. She is El Paso County's first openly queer elected official.

Her legislative priorities include working on public education, housing, renter's rights and transportation.

=== Tenure ===
As of the 2023 legislative session, Vigil is a member of the Energy & Environment and Transportation, Housing & Local Government committees. A bill co-proposed by Vigil passed committee review which aimed at extending free transit throughout the state via a seasonal program.
