= Rebecca Keltie =

American politician

Member of the Colorado House of Representatives from District 16
- Incumbent
- Assumed office January 8, 2025
- Preceded by: Stephanie Vigil

Personal details
- Party: Republican

Rebecca Keltie is an American politician from Colorado Springs, Colorado, U.S. A Republican, Keltie is the representative for Colorado House of Representatives District 16, which includes part of Colorado Springs in El Paso County.

== Background and career ==
Keltie retired from the United States Navy after having served for 21 years. She has served on the CSU Extension Advisory Board for her county.

In 2022, Keltie volunteered for an election denial organization named U.S. Election Integrity Plan, participating in canvassing efforts to find instances of alleged election fraud. She has also promoted conspiracy theories over election security.

In an April 2025 leaked Signal group chat, Keltie joked about Democratic Rep. Yara Zokaie's outfit when a photo of her was uploaded to the chat, suggesting that Zokaie dressed like a prostitute, saying "I thought it was come in Jeans day not in just your underwear day. That’s horrible and we need a professional dress code! And NO I don’t mean the 'oldest profession' style!".

In May 2025, Keltie said on a conservative podcast that "Colorado needs to be burned to the ground" during a conversation about legislation and state policies. She also said in the podcast that Democrats were "evil", adding that "It’s very difficult for me to think that they even have a soul. I’m not even sure they even have a soul." Keltie later defended her remarks.

== Elections ==
=== 2022 ===
In 2022, she was a candidate to represent Colorado's 5th congressional district but was unsuccessful.

=== 2024 ===
In the 2024 Republican primary election for Colorado House of Representatives District 16, Keltie ran unopposed.

In the 2024 general election, the initial results showed Keltie defeating Democratic incumbent Stephanie Vigil, with Keltie having received 20,641 votes (50.01%) and Vigil having received 20,635 votes (49.99%), a margin of six votes. This narrow margin triggered an automatic recount, which took place during the first week in December. The recount resulted in Keltie defeating Vigil by three votes.

=== 2026 ===
In October 2025, Keltie announced that she would not seek re-election to her house seat in 2026 due to medical reasons.
