= Andres G. Pico =

American politician

Member of the Colorado House of Representatives from the 16th district
- In office January 13, 2021 – January 9, 2023
- Preceded by: Larry Liston
- Succeeded by: Stephanie Vigil

Personal details
- Party: Republican
- Spouse: Janice
- Children: 9
- Occupation: Retired naval flight officer, politician
- Website: Campaign website

Military service
- Allegiance: United States
- Branch/service: United States Navy

Andres G. Pico is an American politician and a former member of the Colorado House of Representatives, from Colorado Springs, Colorado. A Republican, Pico represented District 16, which included a part of El Paso County, Colorado. Most but not all of the district was within the city of Colorado Springs.

== Public service ==
Pico was elected to the District 6 Colorado Springs City Council seat in 2013 and re-elected in 2017. In addition, at the time of his election to the Colorado House of Representatives, he served on the Colorado Springs Utilities Board of Directors and the Pikes Peak Area Council of Governments Board of Directors. Previously, he served as the vice-chair and chair of both boards.

== Education ==
Pico earned a Bachelor of Business Administration degree from the University of Arizona. He also earned two master's degrees, including one in international relations from Salve Regina University and one in national security affairs and strategic studies from the Naval War College.

== Military service ==
Pico served for over twenty years as a flight officer in the United States Navy. His service included working on the flight crew of E-2 Hawkeyes and at the E-4B National Emergency Airborne Command Post. His tour of duty included postings in Japan and Italy. After retiring, he worked as a defense contractor.

== Election ==
Pico was first elected to the Colorado House of Representatives in the 2020 general election. In the June 2020 primary election, Pico ran unopposed in District 16.

In the 2020 general election, Pico defeated his Democratic Party and Libertarian Party opponents, winning 54.53% of the total votes cast.

Pico did not seek re-election in 2022.
