= Dan Nordberg =

American politician

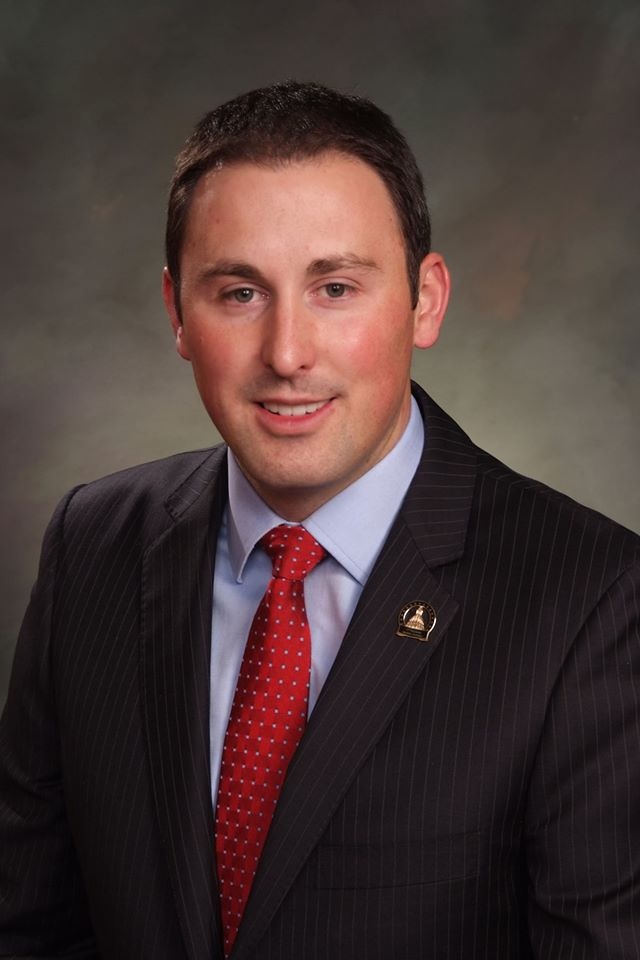

Member of the Colorado House of Representatives from the 14th district
- In office January 9, 2013 – January 8, 2018
- Preceded by: Janak Joshi
- Succeeded by: Shane Sandridge

Personal details
- Born: Daniel Paul Nordberg
- Party: Republican
- Spouse: Maura Nordberg
- Children: 3
- Education: Colorado State University
- Website: dannordberg.com

Daniel Paul Nordberg is an American politician and a former Republican member of the Colorado House of Representatives. He represented House District 14 from January 9, 2013, to January 8, 2018, when he resigned from office to take a job with the Small Business Administration.

Since 2021, Nordberg has been President of Marketing at the Bank of Colorado.

== Education ==
Nordberg earned his bachelor's degree in political science from Colorado State University.

== Legislation ==
During the 2013 and 2014 session, Dan Nordberg sponsored 13 bills, 6 of which were signed into law by Governor John Hickenlooper. Of the three bills signed into law in 2014, two aim to mitigate the possibility of a Base Realignment and Closure (BRAC) by authorizing the state of Colorado to furnish data outlining the negative impact a BRAC would have on Colorado, and improve collaboration between federal and state policymakers. Another law eliminates income tax for non-resident emergency service workers, thus removing financial deterrents for out of state individuals and businesses lending aid in times of declared disasters.

In 2013, three of Dan Nordberg's proposed bills were signed into law. One bill ensured aid received by military families remains tax free. Another bill authorized a study to determine the impact of human trafficking in Colorado so that legislative solutions could be procured. The final measure requires regulators to notify legislators when they promulgate rules as a result of their legislation.

Other bills which did not pass would have:

- Required a super-majority to create or increase fees
- Authorized state audit of Colorado Health Insurance Exchange
- Provided state tax deduction matching federal penalty for persons who fail to purchase health insurance, as mandated by the Affordable Care Act
- Prohibited use of public assistance money at marijuana dispensaries
- Strengthened 4th amendment rights by requiring law enforcement to furnish a warrant to search electronic data

== Committee assignments ==
Representative Nordberg was a member of the following committees:

- Business, Labor, Economic, & Workforce Development
- Joint State Veterans & Military Affairs Committee
- Legislative Audit
- State, Veterans, & Military Affairs

== Elections ==
- 2012 With Republican Representative Janak Joshi redistricted to District 16, Nordberg was unopposed for the June 26, 2012 Republican Primary, winning with 7,442 votes; and won the three-way November 6, 2012 General election with 26,346 votes (76.3%) against Libertarian candidate R. David Lucero and American Constitution candidate Thomas O'Dell.
