= Colorado's 16th House of Representatives district =

American legislative district

Colorado's 16th State House of Representatives district
Representative
Rebecca Keltie; R–Colorado Springs
- Demographics: 67% White; 4% Black; 19% Hispanic; 1% Asian; 0% Native American; 7% Multiracial
- Population (2021): 88,853

Colorado's 16th House of Representatives district is one of 65 districts in the Colorado House of Representatives. It has been represented by Rebecca Keltie since 2025.

== Geography ==
District 16 is based in central Colorado Springs, including the neighborhoods of Knob Hill and Papeton, Colorado.

== Members ==
- Bill Sinclair (until 2005)
- Larry Liston (2005–2013)
- Janak Joshi (2013–2017)
- Larry Liston (2017–2021)
- Andres G. Pico (2021–2023)
- Stephanie Vigil (2023–2025)
- Rebecca Keltie (since 2025)
