= Colorado's 47th House of Representatives district =

American legislative district

Colorado's 47th State House of Representatives district
Representative
Ty Winter; R–Trinidad
- Demographics: 58% White; 1% Black; 34% Hispanic; 1% Asian; 1% Native American; 4% Multiracial
- Population (2024): 93,708

Colorado's 47th House of Representatives district is one of 65 districts in the Colorado House of Representatives. It has been represented by Ty Winter since 2023.
