= Ava Flanell =

American influencer and politician (born 1986)

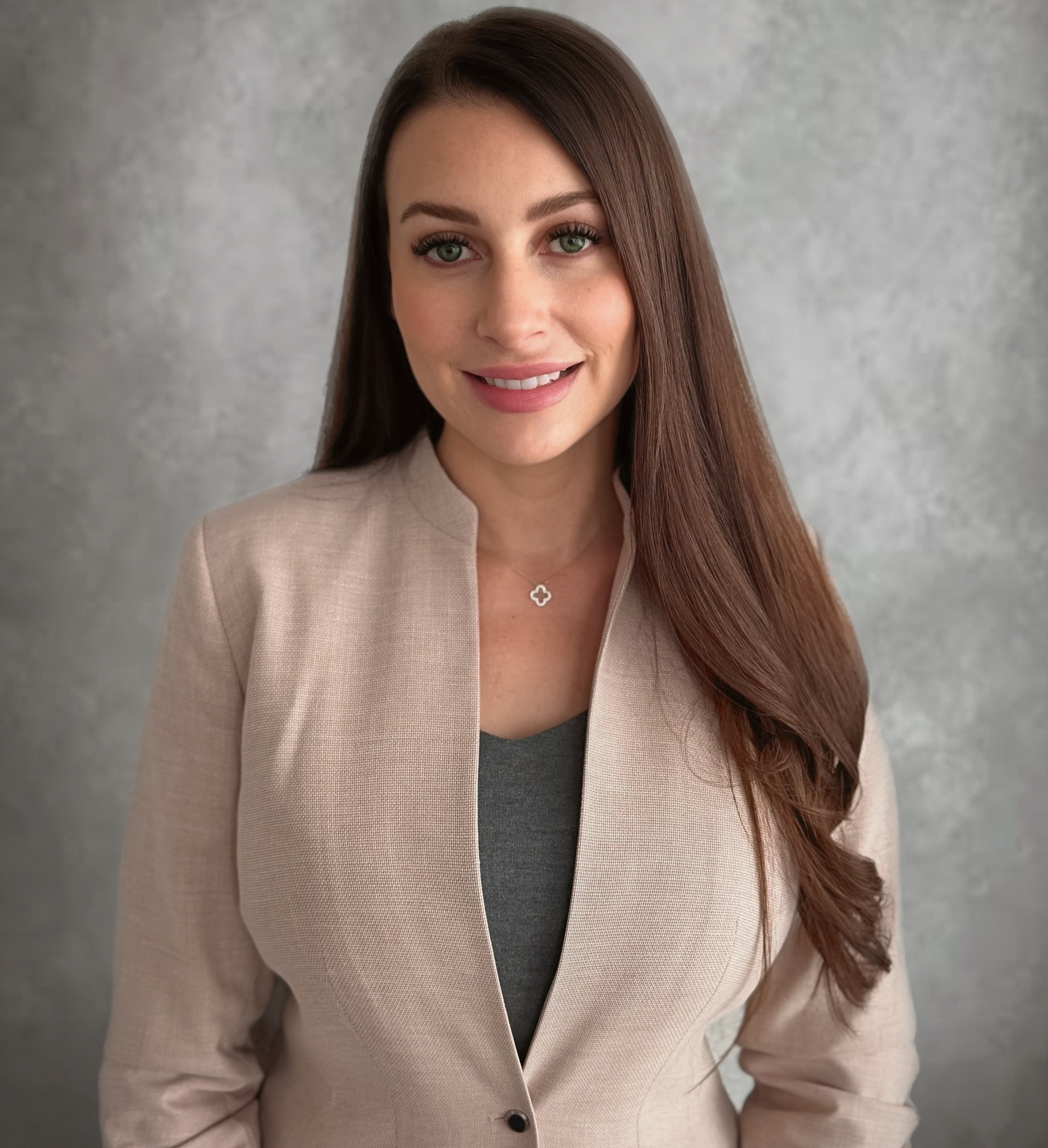
- Flanell in 2025

Member of the Colorado House of Representatives from the 14th district
- Incumbent
- Assumed office October 11, 2025
- Preceded by: Rose Pugliese

Personal details
- Born: July 22, 1986 (age 40) Colorado Springs, Colorado, U.S.
- Party: Republican
- Parent: Mel Bernstein (father)
- Education: Fordham University

Instagram information
- Page: Ava Flanell
- Years active: 2015–present
- Followers: 133 thousand

YouTube information
- Channel: AvaFlanell
- Subscribers: 65.9 thousand
- Views: 115.15 thousand
- Last updated: November 13, 2025

Ava Flanell (born July 22, 1986) is an American firearms instructor, social media personality, and politician. She was appointed to the Colorado House of Representatives in October 2025 as a member of the Republican Party after the resignation of Rose Pugliese.

== Life and career ==
Flanell was born on July 22, 1986, to Mel Bernstein and Terry Flanell. She was born and raised in Colorado Springs, Colorado and graduated from a local charter high school. After high school she attended Fordham University where she received degrees in English and Communications in just 3 years. Bernstein, nicknamed "Dragonman", worked as a weapons dealer and described himself as the most armed man in the United States. In 2012, Flanell returned to Colorado to film a reality television show about her family's business. During filming her mother Terry was killed after a pyrotechnic device malfunctioned. Flanell moved back to Colorado to help with the family business. She later distanced herself from Bernstein, but they later reconciled. Since 2013, Flanell has owned Elite Firearms and Training in Colorado Springs. In 2017, Flanell founded a marketing and media company to elevate voices in the firearm industry and educate audiences outside the firearm community. In January 2025, Flanell testified against Senate Bill 25–3, which would have banned the sale of semi-automatic firearms with detachable magazines. The bill ended up passing both chambers of the Colorado General Assembly in March and was signed by Governor Jared Polis in April.

On September 15, 2025, Republican Rose Pugliese, the minority leader of the Colorado House of Representatives, announced her resignation from the House, citing "toxic" behavior from the Democratic legislators. A week later, on September 22, a vacancy committee from the El Paso County Republican Party appointed Flanell as Pugliese's replacement, defeating Joe Woyte in a 28–26 vote in the second round. The following day, Joshua Griffin, whose candidacy he claimed was disqualified, filed a complaint with the Secretary of State of Colorado, claiming the selection process violated state law. The appointment was shortly after voided by Colorado Secretary of State Jena Griswold, stating that the committee violated state law by holding a meeting less than 10 days after notifying its members. The vacancy complied with the Secretary of State, and on October 11, again selected Flanell, defeating two other candidates. Flanell received 32 votes, Joe Woyte received 17 votes, and Troy Vanderhule received 16 votes. Similar to the last vacancy committee, the opponent with the fewest votes withdrew and endorsed Woyte. In the second round of votes, Flanell received a total of 34 votes defeating Joe Woyte a second time with 30 votes.

== Electoral history ==
2025 Colorado House of Representatives 14th district vacancy committee selection first round
Party	Candidate	Votes	%
Republican	Ava Flanell	26	48.15%
Republican	Joe Woyte	20	37.04%
Republican	Andrew Dalby	8	14.81%
Total votes		54	100.00%

2025 Colorado House of Representatives 14th district first vacancy committee selection second round
Party	Candidate	Votes	%
Republican	Ava Flanell	28	51.85%
Republican	Joe Woyte	26	48.15%
Total votes		54	100.00%

2025 Colorado House of Representatives 14th district second vacancy committee selection first round
Party	Candidate	Votes	%
Republican	Ava Flanell	32	49.23%
Republican	Joe Woyte	17	26.15%
Republican	Troy Vanderhule	16	24.61%
Total votes		65	100.00%

2025 Colorado House of Representatives 14th district second vacancy committee selection second round
Party	Candidate	Votes	%
Republican	Ava Flanell	34	53.13%
Republican	Joe Woyte	30	46.88%
Total votes		64	100.00%
