= Shane Sandridge =

American politician

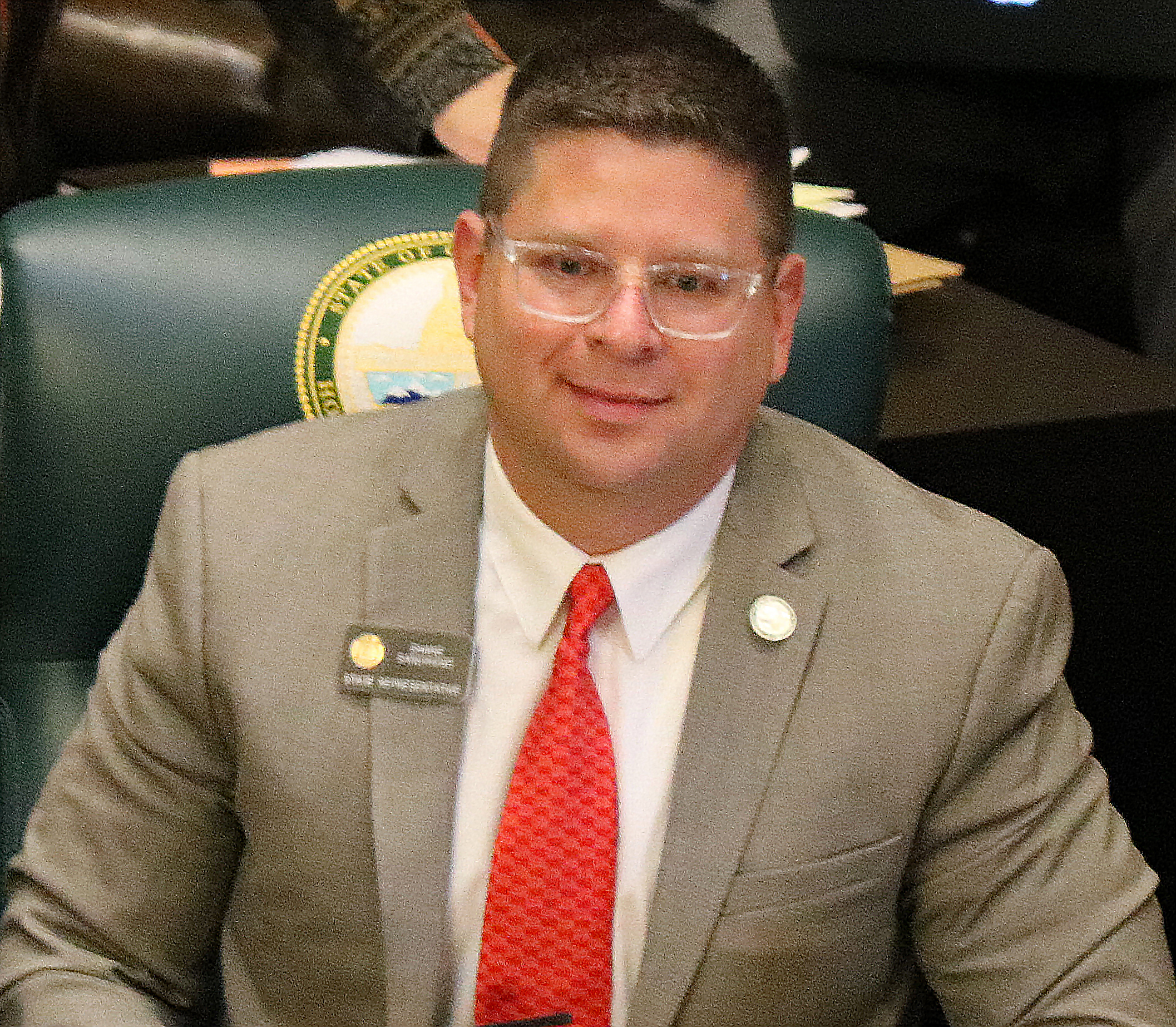
- Sandridge in 2020

Member of the Colorado House of Representatives from the 14th district
- In office January 22, 2018 – January 9, 2023
- Preceded by: Dan Nordberg
- Succeeded by: Rose Pugliese

Personal details
- Party: Republican
- Profession: Investment consultant
- Website: www.shaneforhd14.com

Shane Sandridge is a former state representative from El Paso County, Colorado. A Republican, Sandridge represented Colorado House of Representatives District 14, which encompasses northern El Paso County, including much of the city of Colorado Springs.

== Political career ==
A vacancy committee originally appointed Sandridge to the State House after his predecessor resigned to take a job in the federal government. He was sworn into office in January 2018.

Sandridge stood for election to the office in the November 2018 general elections. He defeated his Democratic opponent, winning 68.47% of the vote.

In the aftermath of the 2020 presidential election, on December 7, 2020, Sandridge and 7 other Republicans demanded to the Speaker of the House KC Becker that a committee be formed on "election integrity" to conduct an audit of the Dominion Voting Systems used in Colorado's 2020 elections in spite of no evidence of issues. The request was rejected, with Becker criticizing it as a promotion of "debunked conspiracy theories."

Sandridge did not run for re-election in 2022.
