= Janak Joshi =

American politician

Member of the Colorado House of Representatives
- In office January 9, 2013 – January 11, 2017
- Preceded by: Larry Liston
- Succeeded by: Larry Liston
- Constituency: 16th district
- In office January 12, 2011 – January 9, 2013
- Preceded by: Kent Lambert
- Succeeded by: Dan Nordberg
- Constituency: 14th district

Personal details
- Born: Ahmedabad, India
- Party: Republican
- Education: Gujarat University (MD); University of Northern Colorado (MS)

Janak Joshi is an American politician and retired physician. From January 9, 2013, to January 11, 2017, Joshi represented District 16 at the Colorado House of Representatives. He previously served a two-year term in the District 14 seat from January 12, 2011, until January 9, 2013.

Joshi was a candidate in the Republican primary for Colorado's 8th congressional district in the 2024 election. He was defeated by Gabe Evans.

== Education ==
Joshi earned his MS from the University of Northern Colorado and his MD from Gujarat University.

== Elections ==
- 2016 Joshi lost to fellow Republican Larry Liston in the primary, with Liston winning 60.87% of the vote to Joshi's 39.13%.
- 2012 Redistricted to District 16, and with incumbent Republican representative Larry Liston running for Colorado Senate, Joshi ran unopposed for the June 26, 2012 Republican primary, winning with 7,313 votes, and won the three-way November 6, 2012 General election with 21,781 votes (68.2%) against Libertarian candidate Michael Giallombardo and American Constitution candidate David Rawe.
- 2010 When District 14 Republican representative Kent Lambert ran for Colorado Senate, Joshi was unopposed for both the August 10, 2010 Republican primary, winning with 6,618 votes, and the November 2, 2010 General election, winning with 20,352 votes.
