= Rose Pugliese =

American politician

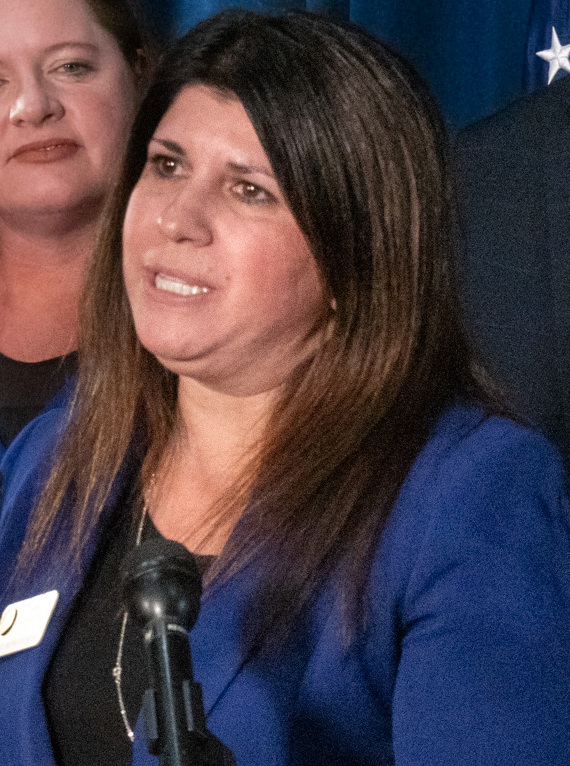

Minority Leader of the Colorado House of Representatives
- In office January 24, 2024 – September 15, 2025
- Preceded by: Mike Lynch
- Succeeded by: Ty Winter (acting)

Member of the Colorado House of Representatives from the 14th district
- In office January 9, 2023 – September 15, 2025
- Preceded by: Shane Sandridge
- Succeeded by: Ava Flanell

Personal details
- Party: Republican
- Education: Villanova University (BA); St. John's University (JD)
- Website: Campaign website

Rose Pugliese is an American politician from El Paso County, Colorado. A Republican, Pugliese represented Colorado House of Representatives District 14, which, after 2020 reapportionment, encompasses northern El Paso County, including much of the city of Colorado Springs. On September 15, 2025, Pugliese resigned from her positions as Minority Leader of the Colorado House Republicans and State Representative for House District 14. This came after Pugliese felt her character was called into question during the 2025 Special Session of the Colorado House of Representatives.

== Background ==
Pugliese is an attorney. She earned a bachelor's degree from Villanova University and a Juris Doctor degree from St. John's University School of Law.

== Political career ==
Pugliese served two terms as Mesa County Commissioner from 2013 to 2021. She moved from Mesa County to Colorado Springs in late 2020. In the 2023–2024 General Assembly session, Pugliese served as assistant minority leader until January 2024, when she was elected minority leader following the resignation of Mike Lynch from the position.

== Elections ==
=== 2022 ===
In the 2022 Colorado House of Representatives election, Pugliese defeated her Democratic Party opponent, winning 27,250 votes (60.67%) to her opponent's 17,665 votes (39.33%).

=== 2024 ===
Pugliese ran for re-election in 2024. In the Republican primary election held June 25, 2024, she ran unopposed. In the general election held November 5, 2024, Pugliese defeated Democratic Party candidate Katherine "Kat" Gayle, winning 60.69% of the total votes cast.

Colorado House of Representatives
Preceded by Mike Lynch	Minority Leader of the Colorado House of Representatives; 2024–2025	Succeeded by Ty Winter; Acting
