= James Wilson (Colorado politician) =

American politician

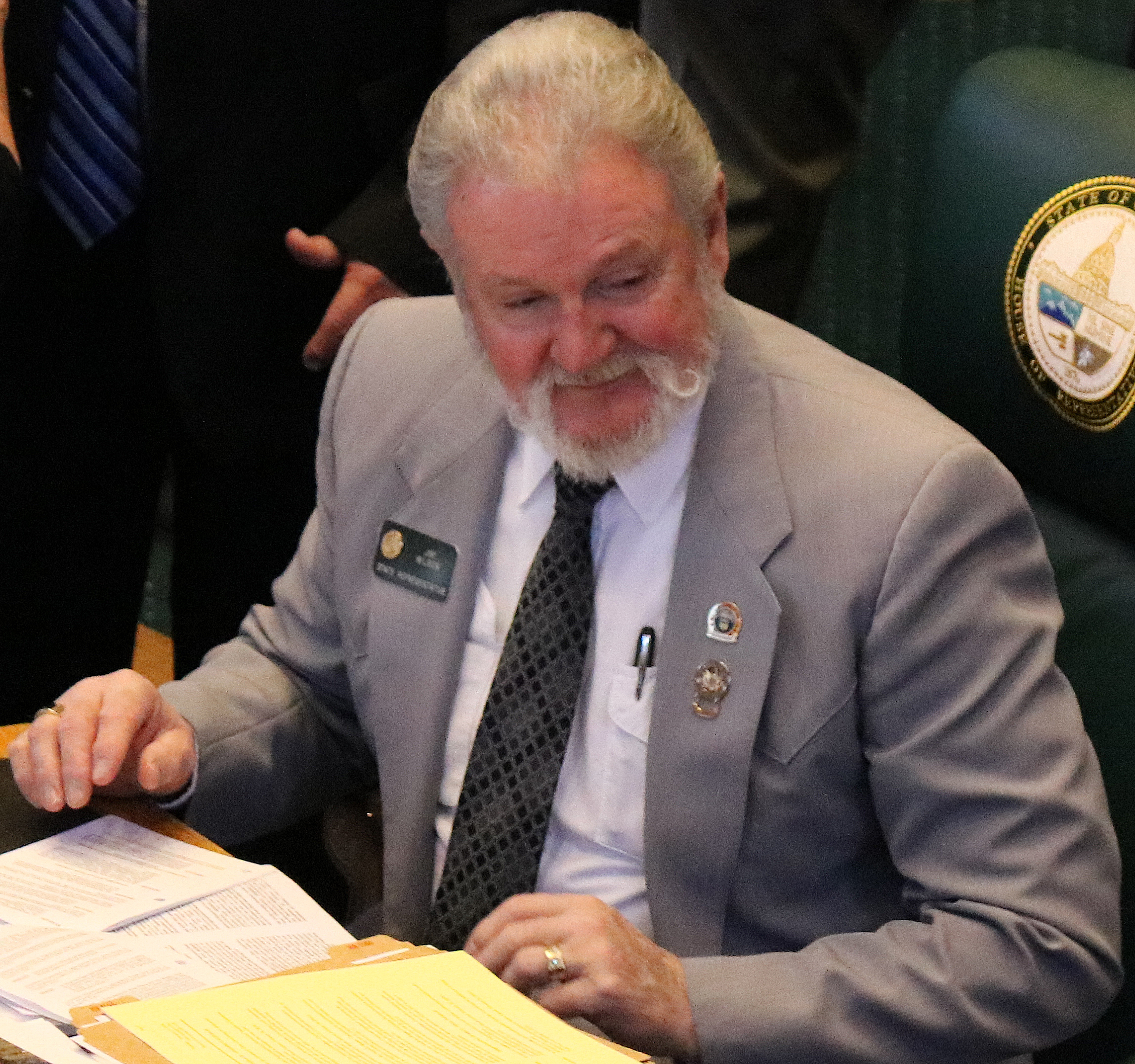
- Wilson in 2018

Member of the Colorado House of Representatives from the 60th district
- In office January 9, 2013 – January 13, 2021
- Preceded by: Tom Massey
- Succeeded by: Ron Hanks

Personal details
- Born: 1945 (age 80–81) Kiowa, Kansas, U.S.
- Party: Republican
- Education: Southwestern College
- Website: wilsonforhd60.com

James D. "Jim" Wilson is an American politician who served as a Colorado State Representative for the 60th district from January 9, 2013 to January 13, 2021. Representative Wilson's district included all or parts of Colorado counties of Chaffee County, Custer County, Fremont County, and Park County. He is a member of the Republican Party.

== Early life and education ==
Wilson earned his BA in history, physical education, and social studies from Southwestern College.

After Mr. Wilson graduated from Southwestern College, he chose a life in education. He spent a total of 41 years in education. During his time in education, Jim Wilson would serve as the school's Superintendent in Cortez, Colorado and Salida, Colorado. Jim Wilson would retire from his education posts in 2012.

== Elections ==
- 2012 When Republican Representative Tom Massey retired and left the District 60 seat open, Wilson won the June 26, 2012 Republican Primary with 4,255 votes (57.2%); and won the four-way November 6, 2012 General election with 22,457 votes (55.9%) against Democratic nominee Pier Cohen, Libertarian candidate M. Bruce Waters, and Independent candidate Curtis Imrie, who had run for the seat in 2006.

=== General election - 2012 ===
2012 General Election for State Representative District 60
County	James D. "Jim" Wilson	Pier Cohen	M. Bruce Waters	Curtis Imrie	Total
Chafee	5,470	3,779	403	156	9,808
Custer	1,725	710	102	35	2,572
Fremont	10,304	5,035	728	53	16,120
Park	4,958	3,190	490	37	8,675
Totals	22,457	12,714	1,723	281	37,175

=== General election - 2014 ===
2014 General Election for State Representative District 60
County	James D. "Jim" Wilson	Curtis Imrie	Total
Chaffee	5,709	829	6,538
Custer	1,853	72	1,925
Fremont	11,505	232	11,737
Park	5,770	103	5,873
Totals	24,837	1,236	26,073

=== General election - 2016 ===
2016 General Election for State Representative District 60
County	James D. "Jim" Wilson	David Higginbotham	Glenn Ingalls	Total
Chaffee	6,190	3,976	562	10,728
Custer	2,051	743	155	2,949
Fremont	12,064	4,627	1,089	17,780
Park	5,941	3,060	845	9,846
Totals	26,246	12,406	2,651	41,303

=== General election - 2018 ===
2018 General Election for State Representative District 60
County	James D. "Jim" Wilson	Erin Kelley	Glenn Ingalls	Total
Chaffee	5,391	5,100	302	10,793
Custer	1,883	827	88	2,798
Fremont	10,726	5,002	597	16,325
Park	5,468	3,497	356	9,321
Totals	23,468	14,426	1,343	39,237
