= Larry Liston =

American politician

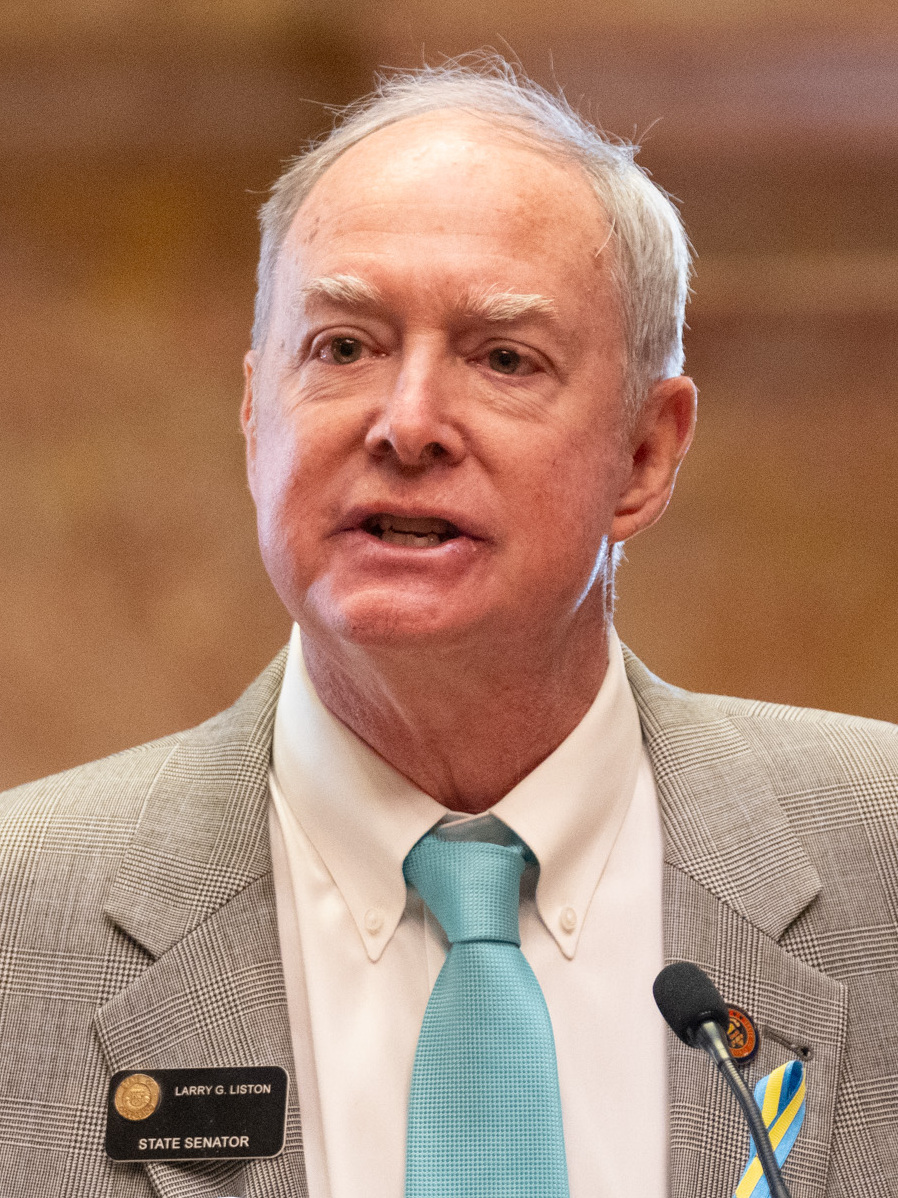
- Liston in 2025

Member of the Colorado Senate from the 10th district
- Incumbent
- Assumed office January 13, 2021
- Preceded by: Owen Hill

Member of the Colorado House of Representatives from the 16th district
- In office January 11, 2017 – January 13, 2021
- Preceded by: Janak Joshi
- Succeeded by: Andres G. Pico
- In office January 12, 2005 – January 9, 2013
- Preceded by: Bill Sinclair
- Succeeded by: Janak Joshi

Personal details
- Born: 1952 (age 73–74)
- Party: Republican
- Spouse: Mary Ann
- Children: 1
- Education: Colorado State University (BSBA)

Lawrence G. Liston (born 1952) is an American politician who serves in the Colorado Senate from the 10th district as a member of the Republican Party. He served in the Colorado House of Representatives from the 16th district from 2005 to 2013, and 2017 to 2021.

Liston was educated at Wasson High School and Colorado State University. His activities in the Republican Party started as a precinct leader and then as a district leader before becoming the vice-chair of the Colorado Republican Party. He was elected to the state house in 2004, and served until he lost in the Republican primary for a seat in the state senate to Owen Hill. He returned to the state house after defeating Representative Janak Joshi in the Republican primary and served until his election to the state senate in the 2020 election.

Liston has been criticized for his actions towards women, and has struggled with the chair of the El Paso County Republican Party, including getting into a fight with her husband.

== Early life and education ==
Lawrence G. Liston graduated from Wasson High School and from Colorado State University with a Bachelor of Science in Business Administration and minored in political science in 1975. He started his work for the Royal Bank of Canada as a financial consultant and later became vice-president in his firm. He married Mary Ann, with whom he had one child.

== Career ==
=== Republican Party ===
Liston served as the leader of the Republicans in Precinct 217 from 1984 to 1996, and as the leader in the 16th Colorado House of Representatives district from 1997 to 2004. Liston served on the highway advisory board in El Paso County from 1995 to 1999. He served as the vice-chair of the Colorado Republican Party from 2001 to 2003. Liston served as the chair of Bill Owens gubernatorial campaign in El Paso County in the 1998 and 2002 elections. He served as the co-chair of George W. Bush's presidential campaign in El Paso County during the 2000 presidential election and attended the Republican National Convention as a delegate for Bush.

=== Colorado General Assembly ===
==== Elections ====
Liston ran for a seat in the Colorado House of Representatives from the 16th district with the Republican nomination and defeated Democratic nominee Mary F. Hafner and Libertarian nominee Scott Paul Graves. He won reelection without opposition in the 2006 election. He defeated Democratic nominee Richard M. Flores in the 2008 election. He won reelection in the 2010 election against Democratic nominee Janet Tanner. He ran for the Republican nomination for a seat in the Colorado Senate from the 10th district during the 2012 election, but was defeated in the primary by Owen Hill. He won the Republican nomination in the 16th district in the 2016 election against incumbent Janak Joshi and defeated Libertarian nominee John C. Hjersman in the general election. He defeated Democratic nominee Andrew Smith and Libertarian nominee Hjersman in the 2018 election.

During the 2020 election Liston was the only candidate placed onto the Republican primary ballot due to him being the only one to receive at least 30% of the assembly support. Eli Bremer claimed that Liston had defeated David Stiver in the assembly vote with 76% to 24%, but Stiver claimed in a lawsuit that there were numerous irregularities in the election and claimed that the rules were constantly changed, the number of credentialed delegates changed, and that the email account set up to receive the ballots was hacked. The Colorado Republican state committee ordered that Stiver be added to the ballot as it was too late to hold another assembly vote and maintained it ruling on appeal by a vote of 98 to 90. Scott Gessler and Wayne W. Williams, who had both previously served as the Secretary of State of Colorado, opposed allowing Stiver onto the ballot. Judge Michael A. Martinez ruled that Stiver could not be placed onto the ballot. He won in the general election to succeed Hill, who was term-limited, against Democratic nominee Randi McCallian and Libertarian nominee Heather Johnson.

Liston ran for re-election to the Colorado Senate in 2024. In the Republican Party primary election held June 25, 2024, he defeated opponents Rex Tonkins and David Stiver, winning 60.72% of the votes cast. In the general election held November 5, 2024, Liston defeated Democratic Party candidate Ryan Howard Lucas and Libertarian Party candidate John C. Hjersman, winning 57.05% of the total votes cast.

==== Tenure ====
During Liston's tenure in the state house he served on the Public Healthcare and Human Services, and Energy and Environment committees. He voted to expel Representative Steve Lebsock in 2018.

In 2011, Sarah Anderson, the secretary of the El Paso County Republican Party, resigned and accused Liston of being misogynistic and that she was warned when she was fourteen to never be alone in a room with him. He signed a letter calling for Vickie Tonkins, the chair of the El Paso County Republican Party, to apologize and possibly resign after she posted "Do you believe that the Coronavirus is a PSYOP (Psychological Operation)? Post your answer…" on Facebook. In 2021, Tonkins criticized Liston, Kay Rendleman, and Karl Schneider in an email for blocking her version of a school board candidate survey which included questions on support for an audit of the 2020 election. Liston and Rex Tonkins, Vickie's husband, got into a fight at a county Republican executive committee meeting. Liston called Tonkins a thug three times although Liston claims that he stated that after an aggressive encounter with Tonkins.

During the 2025 legislative session, Liston prime sponsored a bill that added nuclear energy to Colorado’s definition of “clean energy resources," which would allow future nuclear projects to contribute to the state’s renewable energy goals.

== Political positions ==
Liston received an F rating from NARAL Pro-Choice America. Liston voted against repealing the death penalty in 2009, and he, Dave Williams, Terri Carver, Richard Holtorf, and Lori Saine attempted to stall another vote on legislation to repeal it in 2020. He stated that he would not take the COVID-19 vaccine. He supports a constitutional amendment to enact term limits on member of the United States Congress. In 2008, he apologized twice, first to Representative Stella Garza-Hicks and then in a general statement, for referring to unwed teenage parents as sluts.

== Electoral history ==
2004 Colorado House of Representatives 16th district election
Primary election
Party	Candidate	Votes	%
Republican	Larry Liston	5,510	100.00%
Total votes		5,510	100.00%
General election
Republican	Larry Liston	16,154	60.98%
Democratic	Mary F. Hafner	9,510	35.90%
Libertarian	Scott Paul Graves	826	3.12%
Total votes		26,490	100.00%

2006 Colorado House of Representatives 16th district election
Primary election
Party	Candidate	Votes	%
Republican	Larry Liston (incumbent)	4,675	100.00%
Total votes		4,675	100.00%
General election
Republican	Larry Liston (incumbent)	14,211	100.00%
Total votes		14,211	100.00%

2008 Colorado House of Representatives 16th district election
Primary election
Party	Candidate	Votes	%
Republican	Larry Liston (incumbent)	4,957	100.00%
Total votes		4,957	100.00%
General election
Republican	Larry Liston (incumbent)	15,989	58.96%
Democratic	Richard M. Flores	11,131	41.04%
Total votes		27,120	100.00%

2010 Colorado House of Representatives 16th district election
Primary election
Party	Candidate	Votes	%
Republican	Larry Liston (incumbent)	5,415	100.00%
Total votes		5,415	100.00%
General election
Republican	Larry Liston (incumbent)	13,012	64.04%
Democratic	Janet Tanner	7,306	35.96%
Total votes		20,318	100.00%

2012 Colorado Senate 10th district Republican primary
Party	Candidate	Votes	%
Republican	Owen Hill	9,528	60.90%
Republican	Larry Liston	6,118	39.10%
Total votes		15,646	100.00%

2016 Colorado House of Representatives 16th district election
Primary election
Party	Candidate	Votes	%
Republican	Larry Liston	5,459	60.87%
Republican	Janak Joshi (incumbent)	3,510	39.13%
Total votes		8,969	100.00%
General election
Republican	Larry Liston	26,225	71.87%
Libertarian	John C. Hjersman	10,262	28.13%
Total votes		36,487	100.00%

2018 Colorado House of Representatives 16th district election
Primary election
Party	Candidate	Votes	%
Republican	Larry Liston (incumbent)	8,357	100.00%
Total votes		8,357	100.00%
General election
Republican	Larry Liston (incumbent)	20,177	59.31%
Democratic	Andrew Smith	12,484	36.69%
Libertarian	John C. Hjersman	1,360	4.00%
Total votes		34,021	100.00%

2020 Colorado Senate 10th district election
Primary election
Party	Candidate	Votes	%
Republican	Larry Liston	20,258	100.00%
Total votes		20,258	100.00%
General election
Republican	Larry Liston	47,463	56.37%
Democratic	Randi McCallian	32,114	38.14%
Libertarian	Heather Johnson	4,620	5.49%
Total votes		84,197	100.00%

2024 Colorado Senate 10th district election
Primary election
Party	Candidate	Votes	%
Republican	Larry Liston (incumbent)	12,478	60.72%
Republican	David Stiver	4,538	22.08%
Republican	Rex Tonkins	3,535	17.20%
Total votes		20,551	100.00%
General election
Republican	Larry Liston (incumbent)	49,886	57.05%
Democratic	Ryan Lucas	34,352	39.29%
Libertarian	John Hjershman	3,198	3.66%
Total votes		87,436	100.00%
