= Steven Reams =

Republican Sheriff of Weld County, Colorado

Sheriff of Weld County, Colorado
- Incumbent
- Assumed office December 3, 2015
- Preceded by: John Cooke

Personal details
- Born: Amarillo, Texas, U.S.
- Party: Republican
- Spouse: Sherry Reams
- Children: Drew, Zachary, Carson
- Education: University of Northern Colorado; Colorado Technical University (Bachelor of Criminal Justice)
- Website: www.weldsheriff.com

Steven Reams is the Sheriff of Weld County, Colorado. He succeeded term-limited Sheriff John Cooke in 2014 and was reelected for a second term in 2018 while running unopposed to remain the Weld County Sheriff. Before becoming Sheriff, he was bureau chief of the Weld County Sheriff's Office Public Safety Bureau. He began his career in the Weld County Sheriff's Office in 1997 as an entry-level Corrections Officer. He is responsible for the operation of the Weld County Jail which is capable of holding 850 inmates, soon to be capable of holding 1,300 inmates, and he also serves the courts of the 19th Judicial District.

== Personal life ==
Reams is a resident of Platteville, Colorado and married to his wife Sherry and has three children (Drew, Zachary, and Carson). In a Q&A with the Greeley Tribune, he stated that he had to put his college education on hold pursuing a career in law enforcement instead. He later completed a bachelor's degree in Criminal Justice in 2007, fulfilling a promise he said he made to his dad. Since starting his career he has moved from a Master Control operator to Sheriff working in both Patrol and Detentions throughout his tenure with the Weld County Sheriff's Office.

== Politics ==
Reams has become, what some refer to as, "the face of anti-gun safety legislation" in America and frequently appears in headlines regarding his statements regarding red flag laws. While giving a CNN media crew a tour of the county jail Reams told CNN he was willing to be a prisoner in his own jail rather than enforce a law he feels is unconstitutional. Reams' anti-gun control stance has drawn support from Ted Nugent, who came out to campaign for Reams during his 2018 reelection.
