= Mike Lynch (Colorado politician) =

American politician

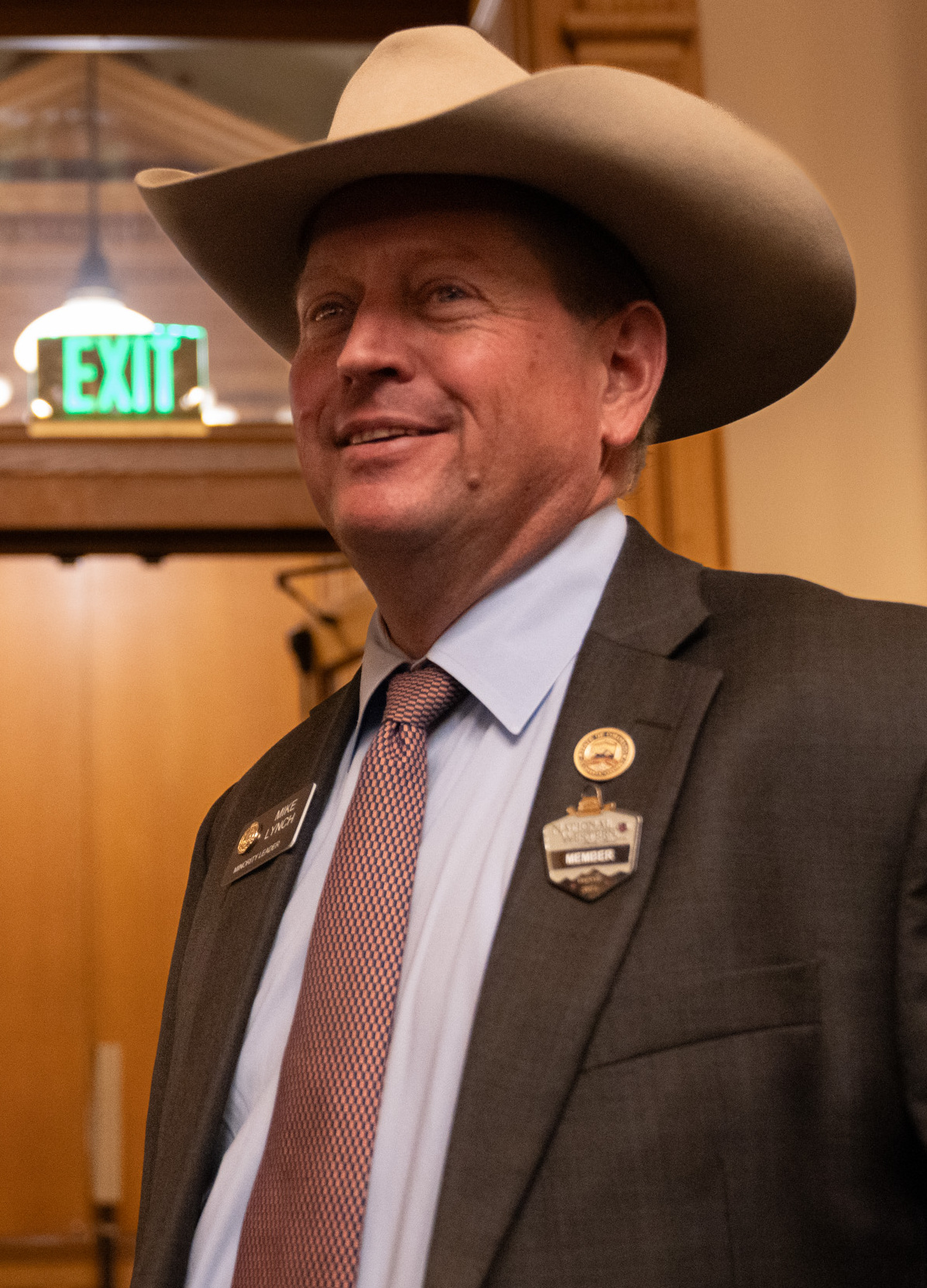
- Lynch in 2024

Minority Leader of the Colorado House of Representatives
- In office January 9, 2023 – January 24, 2024
- Preceded by: Rod Pelton
- Succeeded by: Rose Pugliese

Member of the Colorado House of Representatives from the 65th district
- In office January 9, 2023 – January 8, 2025
- Preceded by: Redistricted
- Succeeded by: Lori Garcia Sander

Member of the Colorado House of Representatives from the 49th district
- In office January 13, 2021 – January 9, 2023
- Preceded by: Perry Buck
- Succeeded by: Redistricted

Personal details
- Born: Michael Spencer Lynch
- Party: Republican
- Spouse: Alex
- Children: 2
- Education: United States Military Academy (BS); University of Colorado, Boulder (MPA)
- Website: Campaign website

Military service
- Allegiance: United States
- Branch/service: United States Army
- Years of service: 1993–2001

Michael Spencer Lynch is a former state representative from Wellington, Colorado. A Republican, Lynch most recently represented Colorado House of Representatives District 65, which includes parts of Weld and Larimer counties, including the communities of Windsor, Wellington, Severance, Tinmath, and Eaton. Prior to 2020 reapportionment, he represented District 49, which included portions of Larimer and Weld counties in northern Colorado.

== Background ==
At the time of his election to the Colorado House of Representatives, Lynch served as the president of The Western Heritage Company. Previously, he worked in leadership positions in SHL-Aspen Tree Software and Stryker Corporation. He serves on numerous boards, including the Larimer County Rural Land Use Board and the Project Smile Board of Directors.

Lynch holds a Bachelor of Science degree from the United States Military Academy at West Point (1993) and a Master of Science in public administration from the University of Colorado Boulder (1999).

Prior to his election to the Colorado State House in 2020, Lynch ran unsuccessfully for the Colorado State Senate in 2009.

== Elections ==
=== 2020 ===
Lynch was first elected to the Colorado House of Representatives in the 2020 general election. In the June 2020 primary election, he defeated Republican State Senator Vicki Marble, winning 67.02% of the total votes cast.

In the 2020 general election, Lynch defeated his Democratic Party opponent, winning 61.05% of the total votes cast.

=== 2022 ===
In the 2020 reapportionment process, Lynch's residence in Wellington moved from house District 49 to house district 65. District 65 includes parts of Weld and Larimer counties, including the communities of Windsor, Wellington, Severance, Tinmath, and Eaton. So when the Colorado General Assembly convened on January 9, 2023, Lynch finished his term in the former district 49 and began his term in the new district 65.

In the 2022 election, Lynch defeated his Democratic Party opponent, winning 62.41% of the total votes cast.

After the 2022 general election, Lynch was selected to become the minority leader of the House for the 2023 legislative session. However, he resigned as minority leader on January 24, 2024, after it emerged that he was on probation for a previously undisclosed DUI arrest, during which Lynch was cited for driving 90 mph and reaching for a firearm after being instructed not to do so.

=== 2024 ===
In January 2024, Lynch announced his candidacy for the Republican nomination to represent Colorado's 4th congressional district in the 2024 congressional elections. In the Republican primary election held June 25, 2024, among a field of six candidates, Lynch placed fifth.

Colorado House of Representatives
Preceded by Rod Pelton	Minority Leader of the Colorado House of Representatives; 2023–2024	Succeeded by Rose Pugliese
