= Owen Hill =

American politician (born 1982)

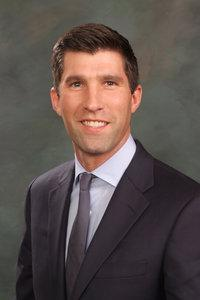
- Official portrait, 2013

Member of the Colorado Senate from the 10th district
- In office January 15, 2013 – January 13, 2021
- Preceded by: Bill Cadman
- Succeeded by: Larry Liston

Personal details
- Born: February 17, 1982 (age 44)
- Party: Republican
- Education: United States Air Force; Academy; Pardee RAND Graduate; School

Owen Hill (born February 17, 1982) is a former State Legislator for the U.S. State of Colorado. First elected to the Colorado State Senate as a Republican in 2012, he served two terms representing Senate District 10, which encompasses Eastern Colorado Springs.

== Biography and early career ==
Hill and his wife Emily are the parents of four children. Hill and his family live in Colorado Springs.

In 2010, Hill ran for Colorado State Senate against the incumbent Senate Majority Leader, Democrat John Morse. Hill lost by 340 votes.

In June 2012, Hill won his primary election for State Senate District 10. Hill faced Brandon Hughes in the general election, which he won with 73.5% of the vote.

After studying economics at the Air Force Academy, Hill earned his Ph.D. in policy analysis at the Pardee RAND Graduate School in Santa Monica, California. Following his military service, Hill served as Chief Financial Officer for Compassion International, a Christian children's advocacy non-profit. Hill also owns a management consulting company in addition to his construction company. The construction company has recently upgraded nuclear missile warning radars.

== Political positions ==
In 2016, Hill co-sponsored a bill to prohibit employers from requiring their employees to join a union, pay union dues, or pay the equivalent of union dues to a charity. In 2018, Hill supported having individuals and corporations making under $250,000 pay a 10% flat tax.

As Education Chair, he worked to provide funding equality for charter schools and public schools in a bipartisan bill. He also co-sponsored a bill that gave veterans college credit for their military training and experience. In 2015, Hill co-sponsored a bill that would establish tax credits for parents of students who attended private schools.

Hill received a 93% rating from the National Rifle Association of America (NRA) in 2018. In 2017, Hill sponsored a bill that was signed into law that legalized automatic knives. In 2013, he voted against a bill that established a fee for background checks. Hill has also voted against requiring classes for a concealed carry permit, and limiting firearm magazine capacity. In 2016, he cosponsored a bill that allowed concealed carry of a firearm without a permit.

Hill wants to repeal the Patient Protection and Affordable Care Act. In its place, people could buy health insurance pre-tax.

In 2014, Hill voted against a bill that would require schools to release their vaccination rates if asked for them.

In 2015, Hill voted for a bill that said that parents had to consent to any physical exam or surgical procedure a minor received unless it was deemed a medical emergency.

Owen Hill opposes abortion. He also wants to eliminate government funding for health care provided by Planned Parenthood. In the Colorado State Legislature, the first bill that he sponsored aimed to end Colorado's state funding to Planned Parenthood. He served on the board of the anti-abortion group Save the Storks and has also been on the board of the Life Network for the last 6 years. Owen Hill was a co-sponsor of HB 2015-268, which amended the definition of a "person" in a homicide or assault to include a fetus in every stage of development.

== Legislative career ==
=== 2012 election ===
In 2012, Hill ran for the open Senate seat in Senate District 10 to replace Senator Bill Cadman after redistricting. He faced opponents Brandon Hughes of the Libertarian Party and Christopher Mull of the American Constitution Party, and he defeated them with a 73.7% share of the vote.

=== 2013 legislative session ===
Hill was appointed to serve on the Senate Education Committee, Finance Committee, and the Legislative Audit Committee.

During the 2013 Colorado Legislative session, Senator Hill promoted an amendment that would have exempted faith-based organizations from providing benefits to individuals in civil unions, if doing so would violate their freedom of conscience.

=== 2014 U.S. Senate campaign ===
Hill ran for the U.S. Senate seat previously held by Democrat Mark Udall, Colorado's senior senator and a former member of the United States House of Representatives. During his campaign Owen Hill received an endorsement from former Texas congressman and Presidential candidate Ron Paul.

In a November campaign speech before Denver county Republicans, Hill told a story of a trip to Kenya where one youth told him he wanted to be President of the United States, "I held back my snarky comment that said 'Well, you know what, we already have someone from Kenya as President of the United States.'" Hill declined to apologize after the Democratic Congressional Campaign Committee called the remark "...hateful and false birther rhetoric [used when candidates] think no one is watching." Hill responded "The fact that my obvious joke is being highlighted today just shows how worried Mark Udall and the Democrats actually are of my campaign for the U.S. Senate here in Colorado." Hill withdrew from the U.S. Senate race on March 17, 2014, citing Rep. Cory Gardner's entry as the reason.

=== 2017 Legislative session ===
Hill worked with Democratic state representative Brittany Pettersen from Lakewood to fund charter schools. With the help of Democratic Representative Steve Lebsock, Hill sponsored a bipartisan bill that legalized switchblades in Colorado. Hill worked with Democrat Leroy Garcia, a US Marine and Iraq War veteran, to approve the boards of Colorado veterans homes. Hill also teamed up again with Garcia on a bill that allowed veterans in Colorado to turn their military service time into college credit at all state institutions.

=== 2018 U.S. House election ===
Hill announced in April 2017 he would be challenging incumbent Rep. Doug Lamborn for the U.S. House seat from Colorado's fifth district, located in Colorado Springs. In July 2017, Colorado Politics reported that Hill's campaign had raised the highest amount in the past decade. In January 2018 Owen Hill ranked #9 on Colorado Politics' "Counting down the Colorado politicos to watch in 2018" list. They said, "he could rise on the national level and put Colorado Springs in the catbird's seat for military and technology investment". In April 2018, Senator Rand Paul (R-KY) endorsed Hill.

In the Republican primary, Hill received just over 18% of the vote, coming in third in a field of five candidates. Incumbent Doug Lamborn won with over 52% of the vote.

=== 2018 Legislative Session ===
During the fall of 2017, The Gazette had multiple articles about squatting. Hill cosponsored the "Protecting Homeowners and Deployed Military Personnel Act", which made it easier for homeowners to remove squatters.
