= Mel Bernstein =

Arms collector and curator nicknamed Dragon Man

Mel Bernstein (born 1945), nicknamed "Dragon Man", is the owner of Dragon Arms and a military museum in Colorado Springs, Colorado.

== Early life ==
Bernstein was born in Brooklyn, New York, to a Jewish family. After dropping out of high school, he was drafted into the Vietnam-era Army and worked on and fired quad-mounted anti-aircraft guns at Fort Bliss; after serving two years in the military and acquiring over 100 tattoos, Bernstein started a motorcycle repair shop, where he built a custom 1966 Harley-Davidson forming a dragon's wings and head with metal and fiberglass, and later modified the dragon's head so the eyes would light up and its snout would shoot fire; Bernstein claims it was the locals who saw him ride the custom dragon Harley, that gave him the nickname "Dragon Man."

== Career ==
Since 1982, after moving from Valley Stream, Long Island, NY to Colorado, Bernstein has run a mail-order motorcycle parts business, gun store, gun range, paintball park and military museum, on 260 remote acres he owns called "Dragon Land". Billing himself as the "most armed man in America," Bernstein has weapons and equipment on display from the Civil War to Afghanistan, including M1 Garands, .50-caliber machine guns, over 92 military-grade vehicles, a functional 40 ton T54 Russian tank, six 1000-pound bombs; medieval Japanese swords captured by U.S. troops in World War II and over 1600 mannequins dressed in military uniforms. Bernstein states that some of his military weapons are so big that he cannot shoot them. Bernstein is a Class III firearms dealer and values his collection of military memorabilia at ten million dollars.

== Discovery Channel accident ==
On June 14, 2012, Bernstein's wife and business manager, Terry Flanell, was killed in an accident during the filming of a promotional piece for a new Discovery Channel reality show featuring Bernstein and his crew, called "Brother in Arms." Flanell was struck by two smoke bombs travelling at 150 mph during a special-effects smoke scene. Bernstein and a family member filed a wrongful death suit in Federal court against Discovery Channel parent Discovery Communications and Anthropic Productions Corp. The case was later dropped.

== Personal life ==
Bernstein's daughter with Terry Flanell is Ava Flanell, a firearms instructor, social media personality, and politician.
