= Colorado's 10th Senate district =

American legislative district

Colorado's 10th State Senate district
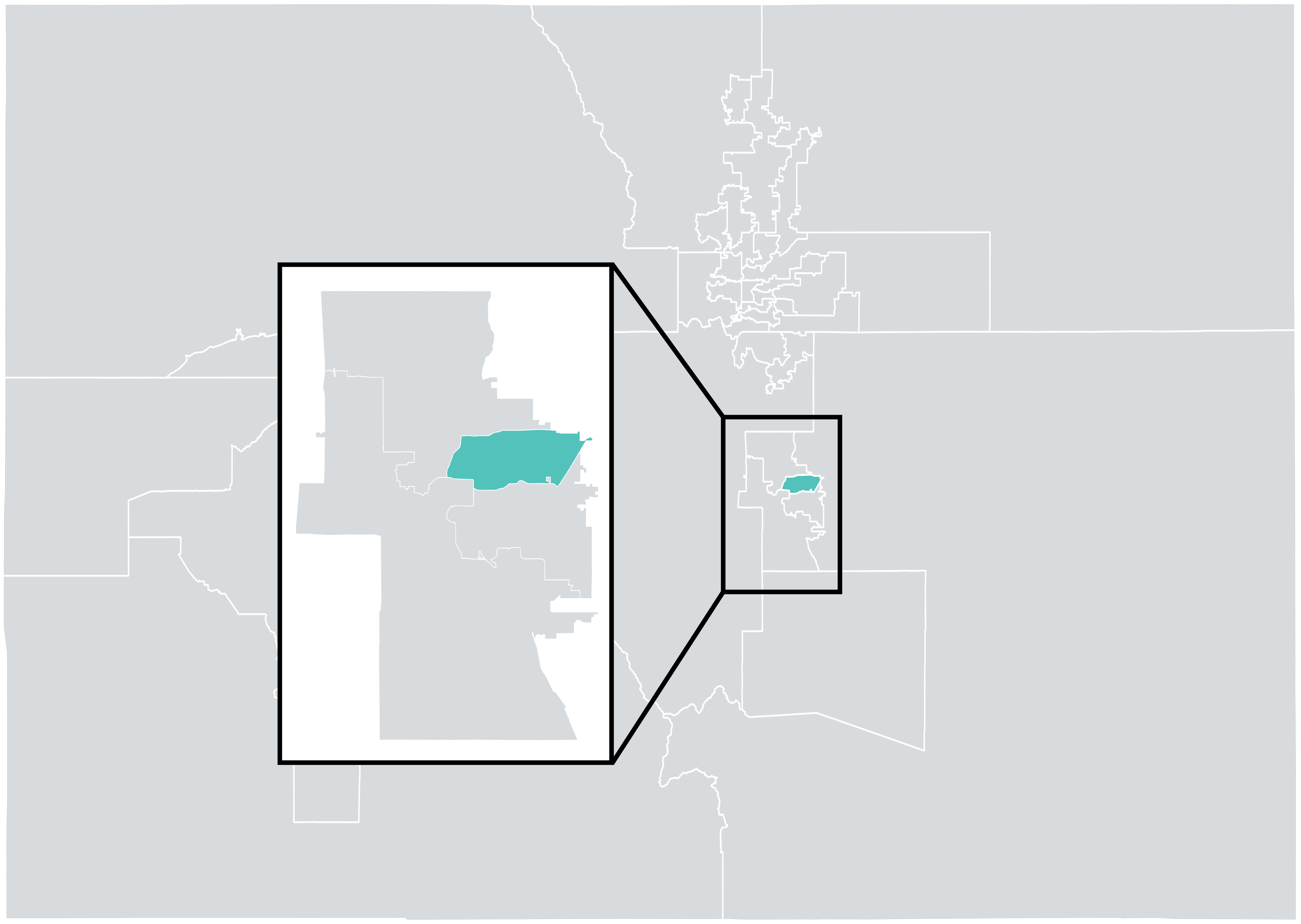
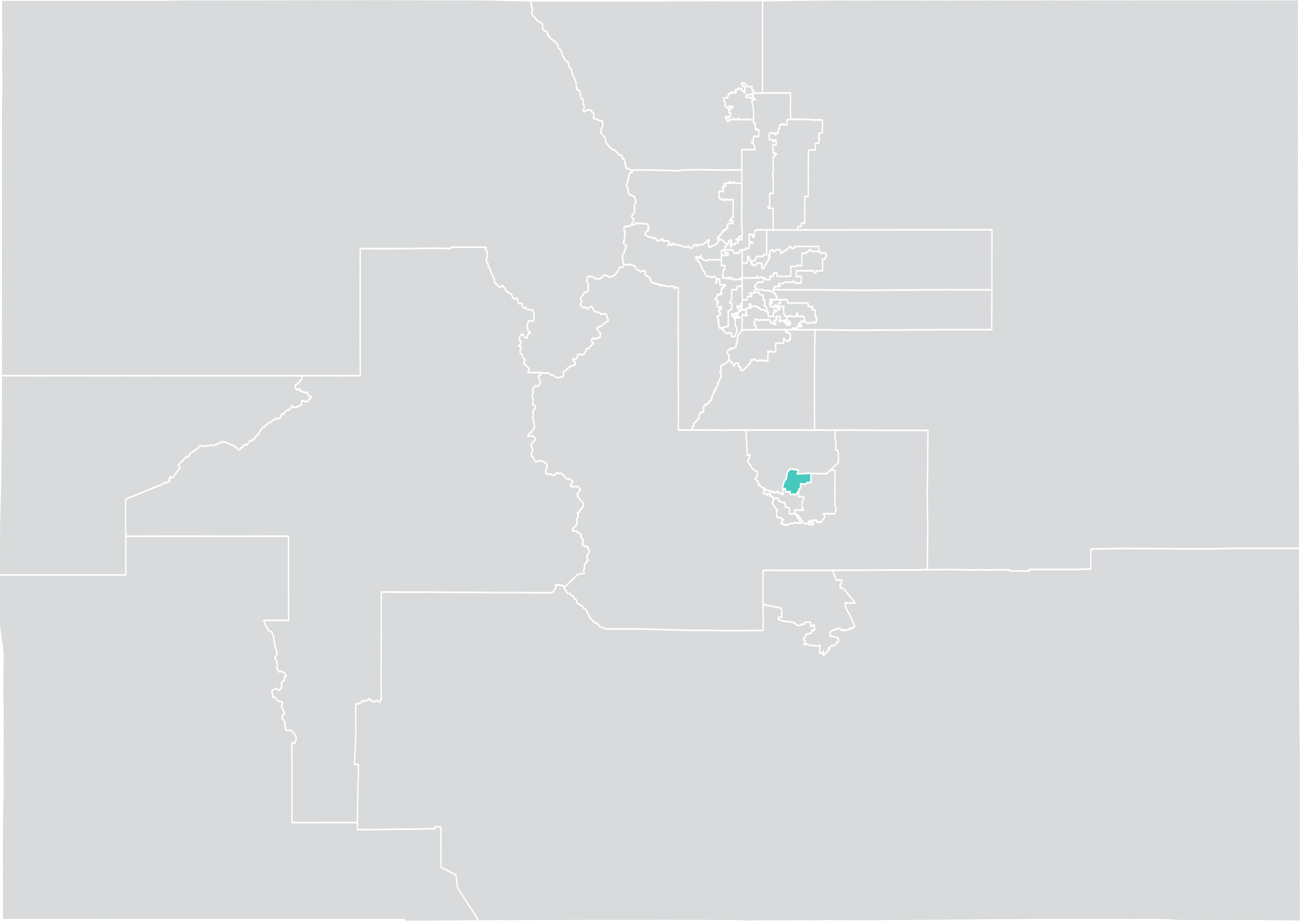
Senator
Larry Liston; R–Colorado Springs
- Registration: 29.9% Republican; 16.9% Democratic; 50.6% No party preference
- Demographics: 73% White; 5% Black; 14% Hispanic; 3% Asian; 4% Other
- Population (2018): 158,273
- Registered voters: 110,592

Colorado's 10th Senate district is one of 35 districts in the Colorado Senate. It has been represented by Republican Larry Liston since 2021.

== Geography ==
District 10 covers much of northern Colorado Springs in El Paso County, including parts of the city's Briargate and Northeast neighborhoods.

The district is located entirely within Colorado's 5th congressional district, and overlaps with the 14th, 15th, 16th, and 18th districts of the Colorado House of Representatives.

== Recent election results ==
Colorado state senators are elected to staggered four-year terms; under normal circumstances, the 10th district holds elections in presidential years.

=== 2020 ===
2020 Colorado Senate election, District 10
Party	Candidate	Votes	%
Republican	Larry Liston	47,463	56.4
Democratic	Randi McCallian	32,114	38.1
Libertarian	Heather Johnson	4,620	5.5
Total votes		84,197	100
Republican hold			

=== 2016 ===
2016 Colorado Senate election, District 10
Party	Candidate	Votes	%
Republican	Owen Hill (incumbent)	47,832	66.2
Democratic	Mark Barrionuevo	24,430	33.8
Total votes		72,262	100
Republican hold			

=== 2012 ===
2012 Colorado Senate election, District 10
Primary election
Party	Candidate	Votes	%
Republican	Owen Hill	9,528	60.9
Republican	Larry Liston	6,118	39.1
Total votes		15,646	100
General election
Republican	Owen Hill	44,200	73.5
Libertarian	Brandon Hughes	10,255	17.0
Constitution	Christopher Mull	5,721	9.5
Total votes		60,176	100
Republican hold			

=== Federal and statewide results ===
Year	Office	Results
2020	President	Trump 53.2 – 42.8%
2018	Governor	Stapleton 56.7 – 38.9%
2016	President	Trump 57.0 – 32.3%
2014	Senate	Gardner 63.7 – 30.3%
2014	Governor	Beauprez 62.8 – 32.0%
2012	President	Romney 60.9 – 36.4%
