= List of third-party and independent performances in Colorado state legislative elections =

Since the Colorado Legislature first convened in 1876, hundreds of third-party and independent candidates have run for state legislative offices. Only candidates who have earned at least 5% of the vote will be shown. This list does not include candidates nominated by both a minor and major party through fusion voting.

== State senate ==
Election	Seat	Party	Candidate	Votes	%	Place	Ref
2024	18th	Unity	Gary Swing	7,704	9.53%	2nd of 2	
2024	31st	Libertarian	David Aitken	14,515	16.08%	2nd of 2	
2022	11th	Libertarian	Daryl Kuiper	2,264	5.58%	3rd of 3	
2020	10th	Libertarian	Heather Johnson	4,620	5.49%	3rd of 3	
2020	29th	Libertarian	Michele Poague	20,914	31.34%	2nd of 2	
2020	33rd	Unity	Jerry Burton	7,482	8.99%	2nd of 2	
2018	3rd	Libertarian	John Pickerill	14,253	26.38%	2nd of 2	
2018	30th	Independent	Steve Peterson	4,710	5.66%	3rd of 3	
2016	12th	Libertarian	Manuel Quintel	15,071	24.70%	2nd of 2	
2016	19th	Libertarian	Hans V. Romer	5,112	6.25%	3rd of 3	
2016	29th	Libertarian	Michele Poague	3,698	6.47%	3rd of 3	
2014	1st	Constitution	Doug Aden	7,876	14.70%	2nd of 2	
2014	2nd	Green	Martin T. Wirth	13,019	25.08%	2nd of 2	
2014	19th	Libertarian	Gregg Miller	3,664	5.83%	3rd of 3	
2014	20th	Libertarian	Chris Heismann	5,018	7.00%	3rd of 3	
2014	34th	Libertarian	Brian Scriber	2,592	6.05%	3rd of 3	
2012	10th	Libertarian	Brandon Hughes	10,255	17.04%	2nd of 3	
2012	10th	Constitution	Christopher Mull	5,721	9.51%	3rd of 3	
2012	12th	Libertarian	Dave Respecki	8,603	16.86%	2nd of 3	
2012	12th	Constitution	James Michael Bristol	7,762	15.21%	3rd of 3	
2012	17th	Libertarian	Ken Bray	3,848	5.25%	3rd of 3	
2012	19th	Libertarian	Lloyd A. Sweeny	5,104	6.73%	3rd of 3	
2010	31st	Constitution	Clifton Powell	1,697	5.08%	3rd of 3	
2004	12th	Libertarian	Robert G. Herzfeld	9,893	22.20%	2nd of 2	
2002	5th	Libertarian	Sandra Johnson	2,341	5.23%	3rd of 3	
2002	9th	Libertarian	Jessica Wheeler	6,657	17.16%	2nd of 2	
2002	11th	Libertarian	Jeffery McQueen	2,390	9.10%	3rd of 3	
2002	13th	Libertarian	Russ J. Haddad	5,612	16.56%	2nd of 2	
2002	32nd	Libertarian	Richard Combs	6,646	19.08%	2nd of 2	
2002	34th	Libertarian	Patrick Adamson	3,249	14.89%	2nd of 2	
2000	4th	Libertarian	Amy M. Kacsh	2,954	5.48%	3rd of 3	
2000	10th	Libertarian	Patricia S. Gildewell	2,339	5.22%	3rd of 3	
2000	12th	Libertarian	Patrick L. Lilly	10,826	23.54%	2nd of 2	
2000	26th	Libertarian	Steven M. Lee	9,637	24.68%	2nd of 2	
2000	31st	Libertarian	Patrick Adamson	1,383	5.66%	3rd of 3	
2000	33rd	Libertarian	Jesse Wilkins	4,413	12.89%	2nd of 3	
1988	28th	Undeclared	Mark W. Hanna	6,649	22.76%	2nd of 2	
1978	15th	"Libertarian, Tax Protestor"	Jim Phelps	1,679	5.71%	3rd of 3	
1978	30th	"A Citizen"	Joseph A. Kaputa	5,512	21.87%	2nd of 2	
1974	3rd	Write-in (Republican)	John B. Shawcroft	5,719	29.17%	2nd of 2	
1972	5th	Independent	F. Peter Wigginton	3,728	12.22%	3rd of 3	
1972	12th	Independent	Lee M. Leeper	4,058	27.78%	2nd of 2	
1970	3rd	Raza Unida Party	Carlos Santistevan	844	16.78%	2nd of 2	
1970	26th	"Independent Party"	Andy William	2,756	14.80%	2nd of 2	
1970	27th	"Colorado Independent Party"	John A. Hutchins	1,838	10.53%	3rd of 3	
1964	18th	Write-in (Democratic)	Paul N. King	4,706	20.82%	2nd of 2	
1964	24th	Independent	Reg Howard	5,777	15.59%	3rd of 3	
1962	16th	Independent	Rena Mary Taylor	6,507	36.97%	2nd of 2	
1958	6th	Independent	H. N. Archambault	753	7.91%	3rd of 3	
1956	21st	Independent	George F. Burke	658	5.78%	3rd of 3	
1940	4th	Independent	Paul J. Cordova	1,197	9.22%	3rd of 3	
1934	1st (Note: 4 seats open, vote percentages multiplied by 4 accordingly)	"Old Age Pension"	Edward L. Wheatley	13,899	14.23%	9th of 17	
1926	1st (Note: 4 seats open, vote percentages multiplied by 4 accordingly)	"D. T."	William N. Dick	3,814	5.76%	9th of 9	
1922	12th	Farmer–Labor	A. C. Scott	2,338	16.03%	3rd of 3	
1918	3rd	Independent	Cooper	2,403	24.43%	2nd of 2	
1918	16th	Independent	Clayton	810	14.93%	3rd of 3	
1918	27th	Independent	Bentley	1,408	15.51%	3rd of 3	
1916	1st (Note: 3 seats open, vote percentages multiplied by 3 accordingly)	Socialist	Marshall De Witt	3,569	5.95%	7th of 12	
1916	1st	Socialist	Fred Underhill	3,405	5.68%	8th of 12	
1916	1st	Socialist	Maurice M. Kern	3,183	5.31%	9th of 12	
1916	2nd	Socialist	Charles S. Tolman	2,131	13.19%	3rd of 3	
1916	3rd	Socialist	A. E. Newman	850	5.65%	3rd of 3	
1916	5th	Socialist	Edwin S. Agnew	835	7.68%	3rd of 4	
1916	5th	"Colo."	Elbert Greenman	705	6.48%	4th of 4	
1916	9th	Socialist	Paul W. Ross	329	6.03%	3rd of 3	
1914	1st (Note: 4 seats open, vote percentages multiplied by 4 accordingly)	Progressive	Chester E. Smedley	10,588	18.67%	9th of 20	
1914	1st	Progressive	Charles N. Knowles	9,022	15.91%	10th of 20	
1914	1st	Progressive	Maude E. Sanders	8,051	14.20%	11th of 20	
1914	1st	Progressive	Hattie K. Howard	6,732	11.87%	12th of 20	
1914	1st	"No ass'by"	Harvey E. Garman	5,483	9.67%	13th of 20	
1914	1st	Socialist	T. J. Brown	3,660	6.45%	14th of 20	
1914	1st	Socialist	Fred Underhill	3,202	5.65%	15th of 20	
1914	1st	"L., O. and J"	John Hecker	3,125	5.51%	16th of 20	
1914	1st	Socialist	John Nitsch	2,913	5.14%	17th of 20	
1914	2nd	Socialist	C. B. Anthony	701	5.59%	3rd of 3	
1914	3rd	Progressive	C. A. Lemmers	3,435	25.11%	3rd of 4	
1914	3rd	Socialist	M. J. Acton	731	5.34%	4th of 4	
1914	7th	Progressive	James W. Gault	1,478	12.91%	3rd of 4	
1914	10th	Socialist	J. H. Mayfield	444	7.00%	3rd of 3	
1914	12th	Progressive	Henry A. Klinger	1,498	15.59%	3rd of 3	
1914	16th	Progressive	Avery C. Newton	1,543	24.23%	2nd of 4 (Note: Placed ahead of Republican)	
1914	16th	Socialist	E. M. Cline	929	14.59%	4th of 4	
1914	20th	Socialist	W. B. Butler	485	7.83%	3rd of 3	
1914	27th	Progressive	W. H. Abbott	788	10.17%	3rd of 3	
1912	1st (Note: 3 seats open, vote percentages multiplied by 3 accordingly)	Progressive	Gail Laughlin	21,044	36.38%	4th of 14 (Note: Placed ahead of all three Republicans)	
1912	1st	Progressive	J. Irving Carper	20,065	34.68%	5th of 14 (Note: Placed ahead of all three Republicans)	
1912	1st	Progressive	Don F. Cowell	19,948	34.48%	6th of 14 (Note: Placed ahead of all three Republicans)	
1912	1st	Socialist	A. E. Fish	2,991	5.17%	10th of 14	
1912	1st	Socialist	Arthur C. Bruhn	2,982	5.15%	11th of 14	
1912	1st	Socialist	Alden C. Galland	2,920	5.07%	12th of 14	
1912	2nd	Other	Lafayette Cornwall	2,708	17.86%	3rd of 4	
1912	3rd	Socialist	H. C. Darragh	957	6.56%	3rd of 4	
1912	5th	Progressive	Guy A. Adams	2,056	19.36%	3rd of 5	
1912	5th	Socialist	P. W. Collins	882	8.31%	4th of 5	
1912	7th	Progressive	Robert M. Haythorn	2,096	19.41%	3rd of 3	
1912	19th	Progressive	William G. White	1,244	26.27%	2nd of 3	
1912	19th	Socialist	James A. Morris	514	10.85%	3rd of 3	
1912	22nd	Progressive	A. W. Winegar	23,459	33.21%	2nd of 5 (Note: Placed ahead of Republican)	
1912	22nd	Socialist	J. A. North	3,921	5.55%	4th of 5	
1912	26th	Progressive	C. W. Strong	1,308	6.95%	3rd of 3	
1910	1st (Note: 3 seats open, vote percentages multiplied by 3 accordingly)	Citizen's	Daniel C. Burns	15,403	31.81%	4th of 16 (Note: Placed ahead of all three Republicans)	
1910	1st	Citizen's	Benjamin C. Hilliard Jr.	15,346	31.69%	5th of 16 (Note: Placed ahead of all three Republicans)	
1910	1st	Citizen's	Edward W. Hurlburt	14,412	29.76%	6th of 16 (Note: Placed ahead of all three Republicans)	
1910	12th	Citizen's/Progressive	Sidney R. Propst	14,972	27.25%	3rd of 3	
1910	16th	Socialist	Robert S. Clark	990	9.41%	3rd of 3	
1910	30th	Citizen's	Tully Scott	2,076	33.09%	2nd of 4 (Note: Placed ahead of Republican)	
1910	30th	Socialist	Ed. W. Moore	369	5.88%	4th of 4	

== State house ==
Election	Seat	Party	Candidate	Votes	%	Place	Ref
2024	36th	Forward	Eric Mulder	8,532	28.46%	2nd of 2	
2024	52nd	Center	Steve Yurash	18,088	36.72%	2nd of 2	
2020	15th	Libertarian	Mike McRedmond	2,459	5.02%	3rd of 3	
2020	17th	Libertarian	Susan Quilleash	1,621	5.83%	3rd of 3	
2020	21st	Libertarian	Michael Seebeck	1,743	5.41%	3rd of 3	
2018	15th	Unaffiliated	Theresa Stets	11,110	26.46%	2nd of 2	
2018	18th	Independent	Maile Foster	2,489	6.89%	3rd of 3	
2018	31st	Libertarian	Bree Owen	1,883	6.38%	3rd of 3	
2018	54th	Independent	Thea Chase	11,449	33.99%	2nd of 2	
2018	59th	Independent	Paul Jones	18,273	43.98%	2nd of 2	
2016	16th	Libertarian	John C. Hjersman	10,262	28.13%	2nd of 2	
2016	17th	Libertarian	Susan Quilleash	2,116	9.13%	3rd of 3	
2016	18th	Libertarian	Paotie Dawson	2,972	7.49%	3rd of 3	
2016	20th	Libertarian	Judith Darcy	2,425	5.86%	3rd of 3	
2016	21st	Libertarian	Michael Seebeck	7,904	31.29%	2nd of 2	
2016	22nd	Libertarian	Mary Parker	17,207	39.54%	2nd of 2	
2016	27th	Unaffiliated	Doug Miracle	2,996	6.03%	3rd of 3	
2016	28th	Libertarian	Matthew Hess	3,402	8.43%	3rd of 3	
2016	33rd	Libertarian	Kim Tavendale	2,982	6.16%	3rd of 3	
2016	34th	Green	JJ Dove	1,802	6.06%	3rd of 3	
2016	50th	Libertarian	Roy Dakroub	1,401	5.25%	3rd of 3	
2016	54th	Libertarian	Gilbert Fuller	8,563	22.92%	2nd of 2	
2016	56th	Libertarian	Kevin Gulbranson	2,747	5.99%	3rd of 3	
2016	60th	Libertarian	Glenn Ingalls	2,651	6.42%	3rd of 3	
2016	63rd	Libertarian	Joe Johnson	3,678	8.31%	3rd of 3	
2014	7th	Unaffiliated	Elet Valentine	1,111	5.05%	3rd of 3	
2014	11th	Libertarian	Bill Gibson	2,241	6.83%	3rd of 3	
2014	23rd	Libertarian	Michael Beckerman	2,324	6.97%	3rd of 3	
2014	27th	Libertarian	Niles Anderson	2,213	5.71%	3rd of 3	
2014	29th	Libertarian	Hans Romer	2,040	6.74%	3rd of 3	
2014	33rd	Libertarian	Carter Reid	2,015	5.58%	3rd of 3	
2014	44th	Libertarian	Lily Williams	2,076	6.38%	3rd of 3	
2014	54th	Libertarian	J.J. James Fletcher	3,285	10.95%	3rd of 4	
2014	57th	Libertarian	Sacha Mero	5,431	22.97%	2nd of 2	
2012	7th	Libertarian	Desiree A. Maikranz	2,398	5.54%	3rd of 3	
2012	12th	Libertarian	Matthew A. Webber	2,139	5.08%	3rd of 3	
2012	13th	Libertarian	Howard P. Lambert	2,526	5.50%	3rd of 3	
2012	14th	Libertarian	R. David Lucero	5,828	16.88%	2nd of 3	
2012	14th	Constitution	Thomas O'Dell	2,351	6.81%	3rd of 3	
2012	15th	Libertarian	Larry Reedy	4,654	16.12%	2nd of 3	
2012	15th	Constitution	Michael Edstrom	3,322	11.50%	3rd of 3	
2012	16th	Libertarian	Michael J. Giallombardo	5,735	17.95%	2nd of 3	
2012	16th	Constitution	David Rawe	4,426	13.86%	3rd of 3	
2012	19th	Libertarian	Alan MacGregor Bassett	4,735	11.59%	2nd of 3	
2012	19th	Constitution	Timothy Shawn Biolchini	2,503	6.13%	3rd of 3	
2012	21st	Libertarian	Laticia Burns	3,832	18.37%	2nd of 3	
2012	21st	Constitution	Sean E. Halstead	3,318	15.91%	3rd of 3	
2012	23rd	Libertarian	Michael M. Beckerman	2,529	6.23%	3rd of 3	
2012	25th	Libertarian	Jack J. Woehr	2,448	5.18%	3rd of 3	
2012	29th	Libertarian	Hans V. Romer	2,129	5.64%	3rd of 3	
2012	32nd	Libertarian	Brett Halbert	1,179	5.30%	3rd of 3	
2012	33rd	Libertarian	W. Earl Allen	2,182	5.08%	3rd of 3	
2012	39th	Libertarian	Donna Price	2,200	5.06%	3rd of 3	
2012	41st	Unaffiliated	Maria J. Fay	1,855	5.70%	3rd of 3	
2012	44th	Libertarian	Jarrod C. Austin	9,845	26.45%	2nd of 2	
2012	48th	Libertarian	John R. Gibson	8,866	25.59%	2nd of 2	
2012	54th	Libertarian	Tim Menger	13,951	40.96%	2nd of 2	
2012	58th	Libertarian	Jeff P. Downs	2,095	5.89%	3rd of 3	
2012	61st	Unaffiliated	Kathleen Curry	5,732	13.85%	3rd of 5	
2012	64th	Libertarian	Nick Schneider	7,770	24.15%	2nd of 2	
2010	4th	Libertarian	Marc Goddard	919	5.19%	3rd of 3	
2010	12th	Libertarian	Bo Shaffer	1,631	5.95%	3rd of 3	
2010	27th	Libertarian	Bud Martin	1,681	5.80%	3rd of 3	
2010	44th	Unaffiliated	Peter Douglas Ericson	8,889	24.01%	2nd of 3	
2010	44th	Libertarian	Christine Smith	2,005	6.37%	3rd of 4	
2010	61st	Unaffiliated (Write-in)	Kathleen Curry (incumbent)	9,298	33.28%	2nd of 3 Beat Republican	
2008	42nd	Libertarian	James Frye	1,207	6.91%	3rd of 3	
2006	13th	Libertarian	Rand Fanshier	5,178	17.38%	2nd of 2	
2006	42nd	Green	Tim Babbidge	1,893	19.27%	2nd of 2	
2004	2nd	Unaffiliated	Jeff Peckman	2,361	16.81%	2nd of 2	
2004	7th	Reform	Andrew Jones	2,909	13.92%	2nd of 2	
2004	13th	Libertarian	Rand Fanshier	6,113	16.29%	2nd of 2	
2004	17th	Libertarian	Jessica Wheeler	766	5.58%	3rd of 3	
2004	24th	Libertarian	Shawn Elke Glazer	4,987	21.30%	2nd of 2	
2004	51st	Unaffiliated	Pam Howard	3,797	13.45%	2nd of 2	
2002	4th	Libertarian	Ralph Carlos Estrada	1,147	7.57%	3rd of 3	
2002	6th	Libertarian	Jeff Taton	3,397	15.72%	2nd of 2	
2002	10th	Libertarian	Craig Johnson	3,572	17.02%	2nd of 2	
2002	14th	Libertarian	John K. Berntson	3,139	15.33%	2nd of 2	
2002	20th	Libertarian	Steve F. Gresh	3,762	14.63%	2nd of 2	
2002	35th	Libertarian	Steven E. Lechner	3,041	20.53%	2nd of 2	
2002	40th	Libertarian	David R. Morgan	3,799	20.01%	2nd of 2	
2002	45th	Libertarian	Larry Hamilton	4,766	17.55%	2nd of 2	
2002	50th	Libertarian	Lester W. Edgett	2,712	22.45%	2nd of 2	
2002	51st	Unaffiliated	Joe Jabaily	11,567	48.05%	2nd of 2	
2002	54th	Green	Eric A. Rechel	3,624	15.43%	2nd of 2	
2002	63rd	Libertarian	Gene Leverett	3,053	14.49%	2nd of 2	
2000	2nd	Libertarian	Vernon L. Tomkins	629	5.23%	3rd of 3	
2000	3rd	Libertarian	Benjamin J. Aycrigg	2,984	19.26%	2nd of 2	
2000	4th	Libertarian	Ralph Carlos Estrada	1,345	8.59%	3rd of 3	
2000	5th	Libertarian	Martin Joseph Vigil	2,554	19.48%	2nd of 2	
2000	8th	Libertarian	Walter Schlomer	1,924	11.01%	2nd of 2	
2000	11th	Libertarian	Glen A. Brink	2,987	10.80%	2nd of 3	
2000	11th	Natural Law	Mark Mellott	1,751	6.33%	3rd of 3	
2000	12th	Libertarian	Dwight K. Harding	5,483	23.42%	2nd of 2	
2000	15th	Libertarian	Carol Geltemeyer	1,184	5.09%	3rd of 3	
2000	19th	Libertarian	Colette Wright	1,695	7.59%	3rd of 3	
2000	20th	Libertarian	Ariane Hildenbrandt	5,397	15.50%	2nd of 2	
2000	24th	Libertarian	Shawn Elke Glazer	1,440	7.09%	3rd of 3	
2000	28th	Libertarian	Mike Spalding	5,942	23.14%	2nd of 2	
2000	32nd	Libertarian	Stephen M. Hutchens	3,005	24.49%	2nd of 2	
2000	34th	Libertarian	David Wood	3,753	22.46%	2nd of 2	
2000	38th	Libertarian	Richard A. Roeder	4,673	20.19%	2nd of 2	
2000	47th	Libertarian	Betty Kay McCanless	4,372	23.92%	2nd of 2	
2000	48th	Libertarian	Anthony Barbour	4,778	16.06%	2nd of 2	
2000	49th	Libertarian	Robert J. Brooks	5,609	16.53%	2nd of 2	
2000	50th	Libertarian	Russ J. Haddad	3,208	25.11%	2nd of 2	
2000	54th	Libertarian	Christella Lans	4,492	17.51%	2nd of 2	
2000	55th	Libertarian	David E. Cooper	4,137	16.74%	2nd of 2	
2000	58th	Libertarian	W. Dale Murphy	6,345	20.59%	2nd of 2	
2000	59th	Libertarian	William E. Zimsky	1,817	6.30%	3rd of 3	
2000	63rd	Libertarian	Gene Leverett	3,262	13.04%	2nd of 2	
2000	65th	Libertarian	Trent Lynn Eichhorn	2,193	10.44%	2nd of 2	
