= 2016 Colorado House of Representatives election =

- November 8, 2016

All 65 seats in the Colorado House of Representatives 33 seats needed for a majority
	Majority party	Minority party
Leader	Dickey Lee Hullinghorst (term-limited)	Brian DelGrosso (term-limited)
Party	Democratic	Republican
Last election	34	31
Seats before	34	31
Seats won	37	28
Seat change	▲3	▼3
Popular vote	1,201,949	1,238,154
Percentage	47.83%	49.27%
Swing	▲3.98 pp	▼4.77 pp
- Democratic hold Democratic gain Republican hold
Speaker of the House before election
Dickey Lee Hullinghorst
Democratic
Elected Speaker of the House
Crisanta Duran
Democratic

The 2016 Colorado House of Representatives election was held on Tuesday, November 8, 2016, with the primary election being held on June 28, 2016. Voters in the 65 districts of the Colorado House of Representatives elected their representatives. The elections coincided with the elections for other offices, including for U.S. President and the state senate. Democrats expanded their majority in the chamber, winning back all three seats which they lost in 2014.

== Summary of Results ==
Colorado House of Representatives election, 2016 General election — November 8, 2016
Party	Votes	Percentage	Seats	+/–	Seats contesting
Democratic	1,201,949	47.83%	37	▲3	58
Republican	1,238,154	49.27%	28	▼3	59
Libertarian	51,103	2.03%	0	Steady	12
Independent	20,174	0.80%	0	Steady	2
Green	1,802	0.07%	0	Steady	1
Total	2,513,182	100.0%	65	−	−

Popular vote
Democratic	47.83%
Republican	49.27%
Libertarian	2.03%
Independent	0.80%
Unity	0.07%

Seats
Democratic	56.92%
Republican	43.08%

== Closest races ==
Seats where the margin of victory was under 10%:

- District 59, 1.47% gain
- District 25, 3.66%
- District 3, 5.07
- District 34, 6.07
- District 17, 7.91% gain
- District 30, 8.38% gain
- District 29, 9.12%
- District 37, 9.30%
- District 52, 9.40%

== Predictions ==
Source	Ranking	As of
Governing	Lean D	October 12, 2016

== Results overview ==
District	Incumbent	Party	Elected	Party
1	Susan Lontine	Dem	Susan Lontine	Dem
2	Alec Garnett	Dem	Alec Garnett	Dem
3	Jeff Bridges	Dem	Jeff Bridges	Dem
4				
5				
6				
7				
8				
9				
10				
11				
12				
13				
14				
15				
16				
17				
18				
19				
20				
21				
22				
23				
24				
25				
26				
27				
28				
29				
30				
31				
32				
33				
34				
35				
36				
37				
38				
39				
40				
41				
42				
43				
44				
45				
46				
47				
48				
49				
50				
51				
52				
53				
54				
55				
56				
57				
58				
59				
60				
61				
62				
63				
64				
65				

== Detailed Results ==
=== District 1 ===
Democratic Primary
Party	Candidate	Votes	%
Democratic	Susan Lontine (incumbent)	3,651	100.00
Total votes		3,651	100.00

Republican Primary
Party	Candidate	Votes	%
Republican	Raymond Garcia	1,972	100.00
Total votes		1,972	100.00

2016 Colorado House of Representatives election, District 1
Party	Candidate	Votes	%
Democratic	Susan Lontine (incumbent)	17,474	61.04
Republican	Raymond Garcia	11,154	38.96
Total votes		28,628	100.00
Democratic hold			

=== District 2 ===
Democratic Primary
Party	Candidate	Votes	%
Democratic	Alec Garnett (incumbent)	6,301	100.00
Total votes		6,301	100.00

Republican Primary
Party	Candidate	Votes	%
Republican	Raymond Garcia	1,573	100.00
Total votes		1,573	100.00

2016 Colorado House of Representatives election, District 2
Party	Candidate	Votes	%
Democratic	Alec Garnett (incumbent)	34,422	73.28
Republican	Paul A. Linton	12,550	26.72
Total votes		46,972	100.00
Democratic hold			

=== District 3 ===
Democratic Primary
Party	Candidate	Votes	%
Democratic	Jeff Bridges	3,178	56.61
Democratic	Meg Froelich	2,436	43.39
Total votes		5,614	100.00

Republican Primary
Party	Candidate	Votes	%
Republican	Katy Brown	3,441	73.73
Republican	Rick Gillit	1,226	26.27
Total votes		4,667	100.00

2016 Colorado House of Representatives election, District 3
Party	Candidate	Votes	%
Democratic	Jeff Bridges (incumbent)	22,016	52.53
Republican	Katy Brown	19,892	47.47
Total votes		41,908	100.00
Democratic hold			

=== District 4 ===
Democratic Primary
Party	Candidate	Votes	%
Democratic	Dan Pabón (incumbent)	5,103	100.00
Total votes		5,103	100.00

Republican Primary
Party	Candidate	Votes	%
Republican	Willie Pinkston	870	100.00
Total votes		870	100.00

2016 Colorado House of Representatives election, District 4
Party	Candidate	Votes	%
Democratic	Dan Pabón (incumbent)	25,224	76.90
Republican	Willie Pinkston	7,577	23.10
Total votes		32,801	100.00
Democratic hold			

=== District 5 ===
Democratic Primary
Party	Candidate	Votes	%
Democratic	Crisanta Duran (incumbent)	4,191	100.00
Total votes		4,191	100.00

Republican Primary
Party	Candidate	Votes	%
Republican	Ronnie Nelson	813	100.00
Total votes		813	100.00

2016 Colorado House of Representatives election, District 5
Party	Candidate	Votes	%
Democratic	Crisanta Duran (incumbent)	26,130	77.31
Republican	Ronnie Nelson	7,668	22.69
Total votes		33,798	100.00
Democratic hold			

=== District 6 ===
Democratic Primary
Party	Candidate	Votes	%
Democratic	Chris Hansen	5,532	59.27
Democratic	Jeff Hart	3,962	41.73
Total votes		9,494	100.00

2016 Colorado House of Representatives election, District 6
Party	Candidate	Votes	%
Democratic	Chris Hansen	32,624	100.00
Total votes		32,624	100.0
Democratic hold			

=== District 7 ===
Democratic Primary
Party	Candidate	Votes	%
Democratic	James Rashad Coleman	2,629	41.37
Democratic	Michele Wheeler	2,546	40.06
Democratic	Elet Valentine	1,180	18.57
Total votes		6,355	100.00

2016 Colorado House of Representatives election, District 7
Party	Candidate	Votes	%
Democratic	James Rashad Coleman	28,557	100.00
Total votes		28,557	100.00
Democratic hold			

=== District 8 ===
Democratic Primary
Party	Candidate	Votes	%
Democratic	Leslie Herod	7,113	61.01
Democratic	Aaron D. Goldhamer	4,546	38.99
Total votes		11,659	100.00

Republican Primary
Party	Candidate	Votes	%
Republican	Evan J. Vanderpool	842	100.00
Total votes		842	100.00

2016 Colorado House of Representatives election, District 8
Party	Candidate	Votes	%
Democratic	Leslie Herod	38,101	84.81
Republican	Evan J. Vanderpool	6,822	15.19
Total votes		44,923	100.00
Democratic hold			

=== District 9 ===
Democratic Primary
Party	Candidate	Votes	%
Democratic	Paul Rosenthal (incumbent)	6,092	100.00
Total votes		6,092	100.00

Republican Primary
Party	Candidate	Votes	%
Republican	Paul Stevens Martin	2,511	100.00
Total votes		2,511	100.00

2016 Colorado House of Representatives election, District 9
Party	Candidate	Votes	%
Democratic	Paul Rosenthal (incumbent)	25,709	65.86
Republican	Paul Stevens Martin	13,328	34.14
Total votes		39,037	100.00
Democratic hold			

=== District 10 ===
Democratic Primary
Party	Candidate	Votes	%
Democratic	Edie Hooton	4,364	51.24
Democratic	Angelique Espinoza	4,152	48.76
Total votes		8,516	100.00

2016 Colorado House of Representatives election, District 10
Party	Candidate	Votes	%
Democratic	Edie Hooton	35,984	100.00
Total votes		35,984	100.00
Democratic hold			

=== District 11 ===
Republican Primary
Party	Candidate	Votes	%
Republican	Corey Piper	3,607	100.00
Total votes		3,607	100.00

Democratic Primary
Party	Candidate	Votes	%
Democratic	Jonathan Singer (incumbent)	4,475	100.00
Total votes		4,475	100.00

2016 Colorado House of Representatives election, District 11
Party	Candidate	Votes	%
Democratic	Jonathan Singer (incumbent)	25,327	60.19
Republican	Corey Piper	16,749	39.81
Total votes		42,076	100.00
Democratic hold			

=== District 12 ===
Democratic Primary
Party	Candidate	Votes	%
Democratic	Mike Foote (incumbent)	5,688	100.00
Total votes		5,688	100.00

Republican Primary
Party	Candidate	Votes	%
Republican	Bob Dillon	3,006	100.00
Total votes		3,006	100.00

2016 Colorado House of Representatives election, District 12
Party	Candidate	Votes	%
Democratic	Mike Foote (incumbent)	29,663	65.09
Republican	Corey Piper	15,906	34.91
Total votes		45,569	100.00
Democratic hold			

=== District 13 ===
Democratic Primary
Party	Candidate	Votes	%
Democratic	KC Becker (incumbent)	5,879	100.00
Total votes		5,879	100.00

2016 Colorado House of Representatives election, District 13
Party	Candidate	Votes	%
Democratic	KC Becker (incumbent)	34,114	100.00
Total votes		34,114	100.00
Democratic hold			

=== District 14 ===
Republican Primary
Party	Candidate	Votes	%
Republican	Dan Nordberg (incumbent)	8,247	100.00
Total votes		8,247	100.00

2016 Colorado House of Representatives election, District 14
Party	Candidate	Votes	%
Republican	Dan Nordberg (incumbent)	31,766	72.45
Democratic	Chris Walters	12,077	27.55
Total votes		43,843	100.0
Republican hold			

=== District 15 ===
Democratic Primary
Party	Candidate	Votes	%
Democratic	Sharon Huff	1,809	100.00
Total votes		1,809	100.00

Republican Primary
Party	Candidate	Votes	%
Republican	Dave Williams	5,855	100.00
Total votes		5,855	100.00

2016 Colorado House of Representatives election, District 15
Party	Candidate	Votes	%
Republican	Dave Williams	25,239	67.84
Democratic	Sharon Huff	11,962	32.16
Total votes		37,201	100.0
Republican hold			

=== District 16 ===
Republican Primary
Party	Candidate	Votes	%
Republican	Larry Liston	5,459	60.87
Republican	Janak Joshi	3,510	39.13
Total votes		8,969	100.00

2016 Colorado House of Representatives election, District 16
Party	Candidate	Votes	%
Republican	Larry Liston	26,225	71.87
Libertarian	John Hjersman	10,262	28.13
Total votes		36,487	100.00
Republican hold			

=== District 17 ===
Democratic Primary
Party	Candidate	Votes	%
Democratic	Thomas "Tony" Exum, Sr	2,034	100.00
Total votes		2,034	100.00

Republican Primary
Party	Candidate	Votes	%
Republican	Kit Roupe (incumbent)	2,473	100.00
Total votes		2,473	100.00

2016 Colorado House of Representatives election, District 17
Party	Candidate	Votes	%
Democratic	Thomas "Tony" Exum, Sr	11,445	49.39
Republican	Kit Roupe (incumbent)	9,613	41.48
Libertarian	Susan Quilleash	2,116	9.13
Total votes		23,174	100.00
Democratic gain from Republican			

=== District 18 ===
Democratic Primary
Party	Candidate	Votes	%
Democratic	Pete Lee (incumbent)	3,940	100.00
Total votes		3,940	100.00

Republican Primary
Party	Candidate	Votes	%
Republican	Sonya Rose	4,145	100.00
Total votes		4,145	100.00

2016 Colorado House of Representatives election, District 18
Party	Candidate	Votes	%
Democratic	Pete Lee (incumbent)	21,145	53.30
Republican	Cameron Forth	15,556	39.21
Libertarian	Norman Dawson	2,972	7.49
Total votes		39,673	100.00
Democratic hold			

=== District 19 ===
Republican Primary
Party	Candidate	Votes	%
Republican	Paul Lundeen (incumbent)	10,531	100.00
Total votes		10,531	100.00

Democratic Primary
Party	Candidate	Votes	%
Democratic	Tom Reynolds	1,681	100.00
Total votes		1,681	100.00

2016 Colorado House of Representatives election, District 19
Party	Candidate	Votes	%
Republican	Paul Lundeen (incumbent)	40,011	79.59
Democratic	Tom Reynolds	10,258	20.41
Total votes		50,269	100.00
Republican hold			

=== District 20 ===
Republican Primary
Party	Candidate	Votes	%
Republican	Terri Carver (incumbent)	8,108	100.00
Total votes		8,108	100.00

Democratic Primary
Party	Candidate	Votes	%
Democratic	Julia Endicott	2,598	100.00
Total votes		2,598	100.00

2016 Colorado House of Representatives election, District 20
Party	Candidate	Votes	%
Republican	Terri Carver (incumbent)	26,517	64.05
Democratic	Julia Endicott	12,461	30.10
Libertarian	Judith Darcy	2,425	5.86
Total votes		41,403	100.00
Republican hold			

=== District 21 ===
Republican Primary
Party	Candidate	Votes	%
Republican	Lois Landgraf (incumbent)	2,921	67.06
Republican	Steve Elisha	1,435	32.94
Total votes		4,356	100.00

2016 Colorado House of Representatives election, District 21
Party	Candidate	Votes	%
Republican	Lois Landgraf (incumbent)	17,358	68.71
Libertarian	Michael Seebeck	7,904	31.29
Total votes		25,262	100.0
Republican hold			

=== District 22 ===
Republican Primary
Party	Candidate	Votes	%
Republican	Justin Everett (incumbent)	5,375	100.00
Total votes		5,375	100.0

2016 Colorado House of Representatives election, District 22
Party	Candidate	Votes	%
Republican	Justin Everett (incumbent)	26,311	60.46
Independent	Mary Parker	17,207	39.54
Total votes		43,518	100.00
Republican hold			

=== District 23 ===
Democratic Primary
Party	Candidate	Votes	%
Democratic	Chris Kennedy	4,291	100.0
Total votes		4,291	100.0

Republican Primary
Party	Candidate	Votes	%
Republican	Chris Hadsall	3,954	100.0
Total votes		3,954	100.0

2016 Colorado House of Representatives election, District 23
Party	Candidate	Votes	%
Democratic	Chris Kennedy	23,872	55.88
Republican	Chris Hadsall	18,850	44.12
Total votes		42,722	100.00
Democratic hold			

=== District 24 ===
Democratic Primary
Party	Candidate	Votes	%
Democratic	Jessie Danielson (Incumbent)	4,336	100.00
Total votes		4,336	100.00

Republican Primary
Party	Candidate	Votes	%
Republican	Joy Bowman	3,861	100.00
Total votes		3,861	100.00

2016 Colorado House of Representatives election, District 24
Party	Candidate	Votes	%
Democratic	Jessie Danielson (Incumbent)	24,103	56.99
Republican	Joseph DeMott	18,191	43.01
Total votes		42,294	100.0
Democratic hold			

=== District 25 ===
Democratic Primary
Party	Candidate	Votes	%
Democratic	Tammy Story	3,963	100.0
Total votes		3,963	100.0

Republican Primary
Party	Candidate	Votes	%
Republican	Tim Leonard (incumbent)	5,576	100.0
Total votes		5,576	100.0

2016 Colorado House of Representatives election, District 25
Party	Candidate	Votes	%
Republican	Timothy Leonard (incumbent)	26,232	51.83
Democratic	Tammy Story	24,381	48.17
Total votes		50,613	100.00
Republican hold			

=== District 26 ===
Democratic Primary
Party	Candidate	Votes	%
Democratic	Diane Mitsch Bush (Incumbent)	2,342	100.0
Total votes		2,342	100.0

Republican Primary
Party	Candidate	Votes	%
Republican	Michael Cacioppo	1,985	100.00
Total votes		1,985	100.00

2016 Colorado House of Representatives election, District 26
Party	Candidate	Votes	%
Democratic	Diane Mitsch Bush (Incumbent)	22,442	60.75
Republican	Michael Cacioppo	14,498	39.25
Total votes		36,940	100.00
Democratic hold			

=== District 27 ===
Democratic Primary
Party	Candidate	Votes	%
Democratic	Wade Michael Norris	4,154	100.0
Total votes		4,154	100.0

Republican Primary
Party	Candidate	Votes	%
Republican	Lang Sias (incumbent)	5,810	100.00
Total votes		5,810	100.0

2016 Colorado House of Representatives election, District 27
Party	Candidate	Votes	%
Republican	Lang Sias (incumbent)	26,554	53.52
Democratic	Wade Michael Norris	20,098	40.51
Independent	Doug Miracle	2,966	5.98
Total votes		49,618	100.00
Republican hold			

=== District 28 ===
2016 Colorado House of Representatives election, District 28
Party	Candidate	Votes	%
Democratic	Brittany Pettersen (incumbent)	22,431	55.58
Republican	Nancy Pallozzi	14,522	35.99
Libertarian	Matthew Hess	3,402	8.43
Total votes		40,355	100.00
Democratic hold			

=== District 29 ===
2016 Colorado House of Representatives election, District 29
Party	Candidate	Votes	%
Democratic	Tracy Kraft-Tharp (Incumbent)	21,701	54.56
Republican	Susan Kochevar	18,072	45.44
Total votes		39,773	100.00
Democratic hold			

=== District 30 ===
2016 Colorado House of Representatives election, District 30
Party	Candidate	Votes	%
Democratic	Dafna Michaelson Jenet	15,844	54.19
Republican	JoAnn Windholz (Incumbent)	13,395	45.81
Total votes		29,239	100.00
Democratic gain from Republican			

=== District 31 ===
2016 Colorado House of Representatives election, District 31
Party	Candidate	Votes	%
Democratic	Joe Salazar (Incumbent)	18,452	55.39
Republican	Jessica Sandgren	14,861	44.61
Total votes		33,313	100.00
Democratic hold			

=== District 32 ===
2016 Colorado House of Representatives election, District 32
Party	Candidate	Votes	%
Democratic	Adrienne Benavidez	15,736	64.34
Republican	Alexander D. Jacobson	8,710	35.61
Democratic	Steve Zorn (write-in)	10	0.04
Total votes		24,456	100.00
Democratic hold			

=== District 33 ===
2016 Colorado House of Representatives election, District 33
Party	Candidate	Votes	%
Democratic	Matt Gray	25,268	52.16
Republican	Karen Nelson	20,197	41.69
Libertarian	Kim Tavendale	2,982	6.16
Total votes		48,447	100.00
Democratic hold			

=== District 34 ===
2016 Colorado House of Representatives election, District 34
Party	Candidate	Votes	%
Democratic	Steve Lebsock (Incumbent)	14,865	50.00
Republican	Dustin Johnson	13,061	43.94
Green	Jenice "JJ" Dove	1,802	6.06
Total votes		29,728	100.00
Democratic hold			

=== District 35 ===
2016 Colorado House of Representatives election, District 35
Party	Candidate	Votes	%
Democratic	Faith Winter (Incumbent)	20,198	56.33
Republican	Emily Voss	15,660	43.67
Total votes		35,858	100.00
Democratic hold			

=== District 36 ===
2016 Colorado House of Representatives election, District 36
Party	Candidate	Votes	%
Democratic	Mike Weissman	19,423	55.29
Republican	Richard J. Bowman	15,708	44.71
Total votes		35,131	100.00
Democratic hold			

=== District 37 ===
2016 Colorado House of Representatives election, District 37
Party	Candidate	Votes	%
Republican	Cole Wist (incumbent)	23,518	54.65
Democratic	Carol A. Barrett	19,516	45.35
Total votes		43,034	100.00
Republican hold			

=== District 38 ===
2016 Colorado House of Representatives election, District 38
Party	Candidate	Votes	%
Republican	Susan Beckman	29,316	57.83
Democratic	Robert Bowen	21,380	42.17
Total votes		50,696	100.00
Republican hold			

=== District 39 ===
2016 Colorado House of Representatives election, District 39
Party	Candidate	Votes	%
Republican	Polly Lawrence (incumbent)	33,472	71.29
Democratic	Richard Opler	13,478	28.71
Total votes		46,950	100.00
Republican hold			

=== District 40 ===
2016 Colorado House of Representatives election, District 40
Party	Candidate	Votes	%
Democratic	Janet Buckner (Incumbent)	21,391	57.69
Republican	Todd Brophy	15,691	42.31
Total votes		37,082	100.00
Democratic hold			

=== District 41 ===
2016 Colorado House of Representatives election, District 41
Party	Candidate	Votes	%
Democratic	Jovan Melton (Incumbent)	20,933	60.14
Republican	Linda Garrison	13,874	39.86
Total votes		34,807	100.00
Democratic hold			

=== District 42 ===
2016 Colorado House of Representatives election, District 42
Party	Candidate	Votes	%
Democratic	Dominique Jackson	16,103	68.91
Republican	Mike Donald	7,265	31.09
Total votes		23,368	100.00
Democratic hold			

=== District 43 ===
2016 Colorado House of Representatives election, District 43
Party	Candidate	Votes	%
Republican	Kevin Van Winkle (incumbent)	26,595	60.34
Democratic	Scott Wagner	17,483	39.66
Total votes		44,078	100.00
Republican hold			

=== District 44 ===
2016 Colorado House of Representatives election, District 44
Party	Candidate	Votes	%
Republican	Kim Ransom (incumbent)	29,710	64.64
Democratic	Tim Hicks	16,250	35.36
Total votes		45,960	100.00
Republican hold			

=== District 45 ===
2016 Colorado House of Representatives election, District 45
Party	Candidate	Votes	%
Republican	Patrick Neville (incumbent)	35,321	70.04
Democratic	Shantell Schweikart	15,109	29.96
Total votes		50,430	100.00
Republican hold			

=== District 46 ===
2016 Colorado House of Representatives election, District 46
Party	Candidate	Votes	%
Democratic	Daneya Esgar (incumbent)	29,797	100.00
Total votes		29,797	100.00
Democratic hold			

=== District 47 ===
2016 Colorado House of Representatives election, District 47
Party	Candidate	Votes	%
Republican	Clarice Navarro (incumbent)	21,714	57.74
Democratic	Jason Munoz	15,891	42.26
Total votes		37,605	100.00
Republican hold			

=== District 48 ===
2016 Colorado House of Representatives election, District 48
Party	Candidate	Votes	%
Republican	Steve Humphrey (incumbent)	30,417	68.22
Democratic	Annie King	14,168	31.78
Total votes		44,585	100.00
Republican hold			

=== District 49 ===
2016 Colorado House of Representatives election, District 49
Party	Candidate	Votes	%
Republican	Perry L. Buck (incumbent)	35,412	62.54
Democratic	Adrian "Buzz" Sweeney	21,210	37.46
Total votes		56,622	100.00
Republican hold			

=== District 50 ===
2016 Colorado House of Representatives election, District 50
Party	Candidate	Votes	%
Democratic	Dave Young (incumbent)	14,803	55.48
Republican	John Alan Honeycutt	10,479	39.27
Libertarian	Roy Dakroub	1,401	5.25
Total votes		26,683	100.00
Democratic hold			

=== District 51 ===
2016 Colorado House of Representatives election, District 51
Party	Candidate	Votes	%
Republican	Hugh McKean	28,823	60.72
Democratic	Jody Shadduck-McNally	18,642	39.28
Total votes		47,465	100.00
Republican hold			

=== District 52 ===
2016 Colorado House of Representatives election, District 52
Party	Candidate	Votes	%
Democratic	Joann Ginal (Incumbent)	25,876	54.70
Republican	Donna Walter	21,428	45.30
Total votes		47,304	100.00
Democratic hold			

=== District 53 ===
2016 Colorado House of Representatives election, District 53
Party	Candidate	Votes	%
Democratic	Jeni Arndt (incumbent)	30,594	100.00
Total votes		30,594	100.00
Democratic hold			

=== District 54 ===
2016 Colorado House of Representatives election, District 54
Party	Candidate	Votes	%
Republican	Yeulin Willett	28,790	77.08
Libertarian	Gilbert Fuller	8,563	22.92
Total votes		37,353	100.00
Republican hold			

=== District 55 ===
2016 Colorado House of Representatives election, District 55
Party	Candidate	Votes	%
Republican	Dan Thurlow (incumbent)	31,732	100.00
Total votes		31,732	100.00
Republican hold			

=== District 56 ===
2016 Colorado House of Representatives election, District 56
Party	Candidate	Votes	%
Republican	Philip Covarrubias	26,858	58.60
Democratic	Matt Snider	16,228	35.41
Libertarian	Glenn Ingalls	2,747	5.99
Total votes		45,833	100.00
Republican hold			

=== District 57 ===
2016 Colorado House of Representatives election, District 57
Party	Candidate	Votes	%
Republican	Bob Rankin (incumbent)	26,002	100.00
Total votes		26,002	100.00
Republican hold			

=== District 58 ===
2016 Colorado House of Representatives election, District 58
Party	Candidate	Votes	%
Republican	Don Coram (incumbent)	28,195	100.00
Total votes		28,195	100.00
Republican hold			

=== District 59 ===
2016 Colorado House of Representatives election, District 59
Party	Candidate	Votes	%
Democratic	Barbara Hall McLachlan	23,336	50.73
Republican	J. Paul Brown (Incumbent)	22,661	49.27
Total votes		45,997	100.00
Democratic gain from Republican			

=== District 60 ===
2016 Colorado House of Representatives election, District 60
Party	Candidate	Votes	%
Republican	James Wilson (incumbent)	26,246	63.55
Democratic	David Higginbotham	12,406	30.04
Libertarian	Glenn Ingalls	2,651	6.42
Total votes		41,303	100.00
Republican hold			

=== District 61 ===
2016 Colorado House of Representatives election, District 61
Party	Candidate	Votes	%
Democratic	Millie Hamner (Incumbent)	24,562	56.12
Republican	Bob Schutt	19,208	39.25
Total votes		43,770	100.00
Democratic hold			

=== District 62 ===
2016 Colorado House of Representatives election, District 62
Party	Candidate	Votes	%
Democratic	Donald Valdez	19,720	55.51
Republican	Bob Mattive	15,805	44.49
Total votes		35,525	100.00
Democratic hold			

=== District 63 ===
2016 Colorado House of Representatives election, District 63
Party	Candidate	Votes	%
Republican	Lori Saine (incumbent)	26,952	60.87
Democratic	Thomas A. Hudson	13,651	30.83
Libertarian	Joe Johnson	3,678	8.31
Total votes		44,281	100.00
Republican hold			

=== District 64 ===
2016 Colorado House of Representatives election, District 64
Party	Candidate	Votes	%
Republican	Kimmi Lewis	27,952	75.42
Democratic	Kathleen J. Conway	9,108	24.58
Total votes		37,060	100.00
Republican hold			

=== District 65 ===
Democratic Primary
Party	Candidate	Votes	%
Democratic	Anthony Engelhaupt	1,939	100.0
Total votes		1,939	100.0

Republican Primary
Party	Candidate	Votes	%
Republican	Jon Becker (incumbent)	7,674	100.00
Total votes		7,674	100.0

2016 Colorado House of Representatives election, District 65
Party	Candidate	Votes	%
Republican	Jon Becker (incumbent)	25,965	79.25
Democratic	Anthony Engelhaupt	6,797	20.75
Total votes		32,762	100.00
Republican hold			
