= 2018 Colorado House of Representatives election =

- November 6, 2018

All 65 seats in the Colorado House of Representatives 33 seats needed for a majority
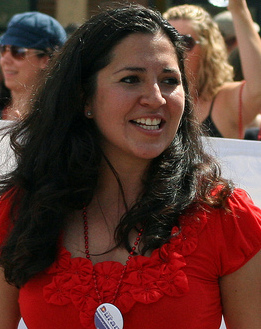

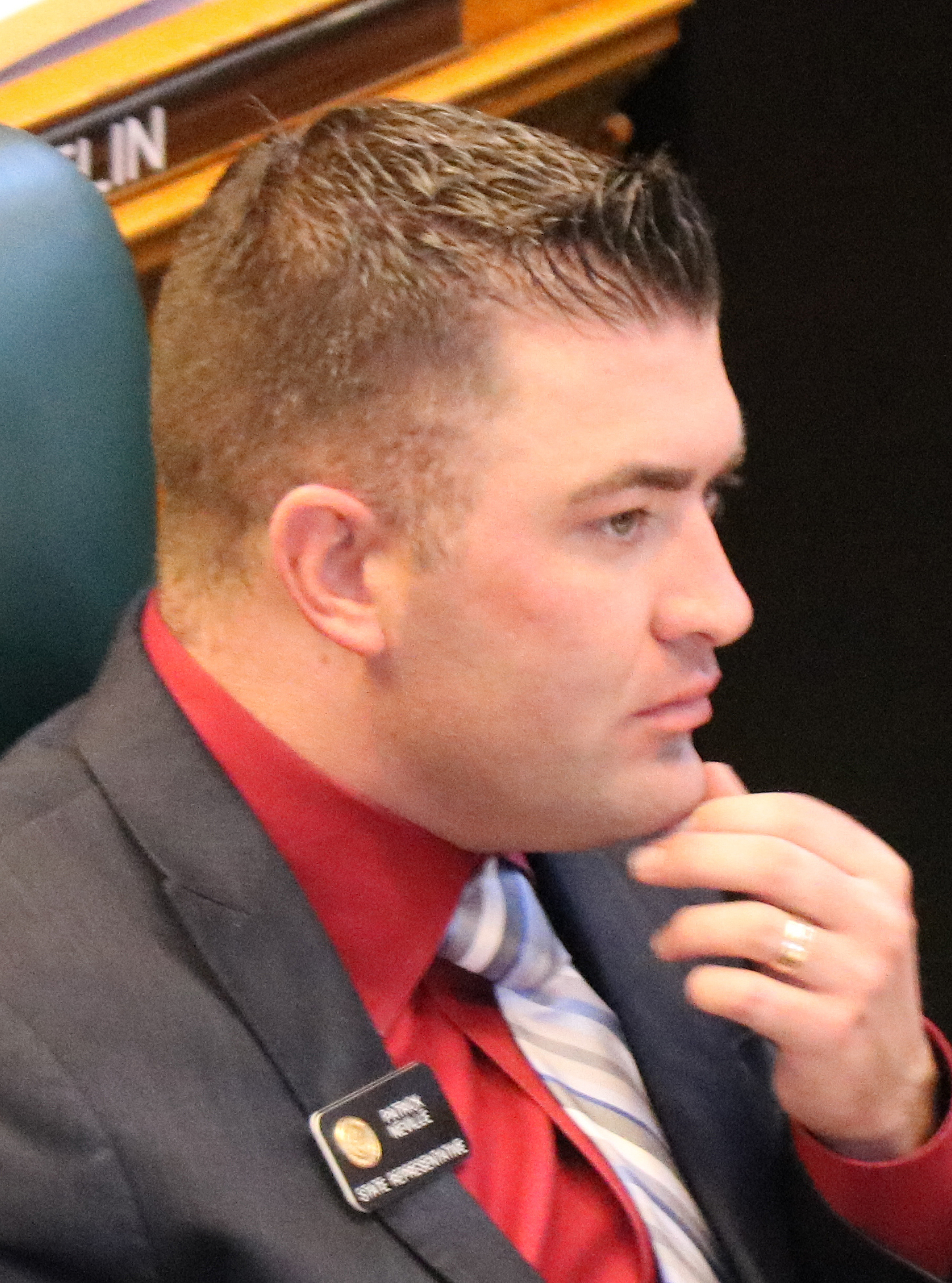
	Majority party	Minority party
Leader	Crisanta Duran (term-limited)	Patrick Neville
Party	Democratic	Republican
Leader's seat	5th	45th
Last election	37	28
Seats before	36	29
Seats won	41	24
Seat change	▲5	▼5
Popular vote	1,321,710	1,025,765
Percentage	54.80%	42.53%
Swing	▲6.97%	▼6.74%
- Results: Democratic hold Democratic gain Republican hold
Speaker of the House before election
Crisanta Duran
Democratic
Elected Speaker of the House
KC Becker
Democratic

The 2018 Colorado House of Representatives elections took place as part of the biennial United States elections. Colorado voters elected state representatives in all 65 of the state house's districts. State representatives serve two-year terms in the Colorado House of Representatives. The Colorado Reapportionment Commission provides a statewide map of the state House here, and individual district maps are available from the U.S. Census here.

A primary election on June 26, 2018, determined which candidates appeared on the November 6 general election ballot. Primary election results can be obtained from the Colorado Secretary of State's website.

Following the 2016 state House elections, Democrats maintained effective control of the House with 37 members. However, on March 2, 2018, immediately before being expelled from the legislature in the face of sexual harassment allegations, State Representative Steve Lebsock switched parties to Republican. This forced his replacement to be a fellow Republican. Due to these acts, Republican seats increased from 28 to 29 (Republican Alex Winkler was seated on March 23, 2018, to represent District 34) and Democratic seats decreased from 37 to 36 by election day 2018.

On election day, Democrats expanded their majority by five seats, as the party also swept all statewide elections in the state. To claim control of the chamber from Democrats, the Republicans would have needed to net four House seats.

== Results ==
Colorado House of Representatives election, 2018 General election — November 6, 2018
Party	Votes	Percentage	Seats	+/–	Seats contesting
Democratic	1,321,710	54.80%	41	▲5	64
Republican	1,025,765	42.53%	24	▼5	58
Independent	46,447	1.93%	0	Steady	6
Libertarian	17,153	0.71%	0	Steady	12
Unity	874	0.04%	0	Steady	1
Total	2,411,949	100.0%	65	−	−

Popular vote
Democratic	54.80%
Republican	42.53%
Independent	1.93%
Libertarian	0.71%
Unity	0.04%

Seats
Democratic	63.08%
Republican	36.92%

State House district	Incumbent	Party	Elected representative	Party
1st	Susan Lontine	Dem	Susan Lontine	Dem
2nd	Alec Garnett	Dem	Alec Garnett	Dem
3rd	Jeff Bridges	Dem	Jeff Bridges	Dem
4th	Dan Pabon	Dem	Serena Gonzales-Gutierrez	Dem
5th	Crisanta Duran	Dem	Alex Valdez	Dem
6th	Chris Hansen	Dem	Chris Hansen	Dem
7th	James Coleman	Dem	James Coleman	Dem
8th	Leslie Herod	Dem	Leslie Herod	Dem
9th	Paul Rosenthal	Dem	Emily Sirota	Dem
10th	Edie Hooton	Dem	Edie Hooton	Dem
11th	Jonathan Singer	Dem	Jonathan Singer	Dem
12th	Mike Foote	Dem	Sonya Jaquez Lewis	Dem
13th	KC Becker	Dem	KC Becker	Dem
14th	Shane Sandridge	Rep	Shane Sandridge	Rep
15th	Dave Williams	Rep	Dave Williams	Rep
16th	Larry Liston	Rep	Larry Liston	Rep
17th	Tony Exum	Dem	Tony Exum	Dem
18th	Pete Lee	Dem	Marc Snyder	Dem
19th	Paul Lundeen	Rep	Tim Geitner	Rep
20th	Terri Carver	Rep	Terri Carver	Rep
21st	Lois Landgraf	Rep	Lois Landgraf	Rep
22nd	Justin Everett	Rep	Colin Larson	Rep
23rd	Chris Kennedy	Dem	Chris Kennedy	Dem
24th	Jessie Danielson	Dem	Monica Duran	Dem
25th	Tim Leonard	Rep	Lisa Cutter	Dem
26th	Dylan Roberts	Dem	Dylan Roberts	Dem
27th	Lang Sias	Rep	Brianna Titone	Dem
28th	Brittany Pettersen	Dem	Kerry Tipper	Dem
29th	Tracy Kraft-Tharp	Dem	Tracy Kraft-Tharp	Dem
30th	Dafna Michaelson Jenet	Dem	Dafna Michaelson Jenet	Dem
31st	Joseph Salazar	Dem	Yadira Caraveo	Dem
32nd	Adrienne Benavidez	Dem	Adrienne Benavidez	Dem
33rd	Matt Gray	Dem	Matt Gray	Dem
34th	Alex Winkler	Rep	Kyle Mullica	Dem
35th	Faith Winter	Dem	Shannon Bird	Dem
36th	Mike Weissman	Dem	Mike Weissman	Dem
37th	Cole Wist	Rep	Tom Sullivan	Dem
38th	Susan Beckman	Rep	Susan Beckman	Rep
39th	Polly Lawrence	Rep	Mark Baisley	Rep
40th	Janet Buckner	Dem	Janet Buckner	Dem
41st	Jovan Melton	Dem	Jovan Melton	Dem
42nd	Dominique Jackson	Dem	Dominique Jackson	Dem
43rd	Kevin Van Winkle	Rep	Kevin Van Winkle	Rep
44th	Kim Ransom	Rep	Kim Ransom	Rep
45th	Patrick Neville	Rep	Patrick Neville	Rep
46th	Daneya Esgar	Dem	Daneya Esgar	Dem
47th	Judy Reyher	Rep	Bri Buentello	Dem
48th	Stephen Humphrey	Rep	Stephen Humphrey	Rep
49th	Perry Buck	Rep	Perry Buck	Rep
50th	Dave Young	Dem	Rochelle Galindo	Dem
51st	Hugh McKean	Rep	Hugh McKean	Rep
52nd	Joann Ginal	Dem	Joann Ginal	Dem
53rd	Jennifer Arndt	Dem	Jennifer Arndt	Dem
54th	Yeulin Willett	Rep	Matt Soper	Rep
55th	Dan Thurlow	Rep	Janice Rich	Rep
56th	Philip Covarrubias	Rep	Rod Bockenfeld	Rep
57th	Bob Rankin	Rep	Bob Rankin	Rep
58th	Marc Catlin	Rep	Marc Catlin	Rep
59th	Barbara Hall McLachlan	Dem	Barbara Hall McLachlan	Dem
60th	James Wilson	Rep	James Wilson	Rep
61st	Millie Hamner	Dem	Julie McCluskie	Dem
62nd	Don Valdez	Dem	Don Valdez	Dem
63rd	Lori Saine	Rep	Lori Saine	Rep
64th	Kimmi Lewis	Rep	Kimmi Lewis	Rep
65th	Jon Becker	Rep	Rod Pelton	Rep

== Incumbents not seeking re-election ==
=== Term-limited incumbents ===
Five Democratic incumbents were term-limited and prohibited from seeking a fifth term.

- Dan Pabon (D), District 4
- Crisanta Duran (D), District 5
- Pete Lee (D), District 18
- Dave Young (D), District 50
- Millie Hamner (D), District 61

=== Retiring incumbents ===
- Mike Foote (D), District 12
- Paul Lundeen (R), District 19 (ran for state senate)
- Justin Everett (R), District 22 (ran for treasurer)
- Jessie Danielson (D), District 24 (ran for state senate)
- Brittany Pettersen (D), District 28 (ran for state senate)
- Joseph Salazar (D), District 31 (ran for attorney general)
- Faith Winter (D), District 35 (ran for state senate)
- Polly Lawrence (R), District 39 (ran for treasurer)
- Yeulin Willett (R), District 54
- Dan Thurlow (R), District 55 (ran for state senate)
- Jon Becker (R), District 65

=== Eliminated at convention ===
- Paul Rosenthal (D), District 9

== Closest races ==
Seats where the margin of victory was under 10%:

- District 38, 0.78%
- District 27, 0.88% gain
- District 47, 1.00% gain
- District 25, 5.48% gain
- District 50, 6.74%
- District 22, 7.26%
- District 37, 8.06% gain
- District 43, 8.76%

== Predictions ==
Source	Ranking	As of
Governing	Likely D	October 8, 2018

== Detailed results ==
=== District 1 ===
Democratic primary
Party	Candidate	Votes	%
Democratic	Susan Lontine (incumbent)	7,395	100.0
Total votes		7,395	100.0

Republican primary
Party	Candidate	Votes	%
Republican	Alysia Padilla	3,054	100.0
Total votes		3,054	100.0

1st District general election, 2018
Party	Candidate	Votes	%
Democratic	Susan Lontine (incumbent)	17,400	64.00
Republican	Alysia Padilla	8,687	31.95
Libertarian	Darrell Dinges	1,099	4.04
Total votes		27,186	100.0
Democratic hold			

=== District 2 ===
Democratic primary
Party	Candidate	Votes	%
Democratic	Alec Garnett (incumbent)	16,041	100.0
Total votes		16,041	100.0

2nd District general election, 2018
Party	Candidate	Votes	%
Democratic	Alec Garnett (incumbent)	40,121	100.0
Total votes		40,121	100.0
Democratic hold			

=== District 3 ===
Democratic primary
Party	Candidate	Votes	%
Democratic	Jeff Bridges (incumbent)	8,528	100.0
Total votes		8,528	100.0

Republican primary
Party	Candidate	Votes	%
Republican	Toren Mushovic	5,578	100.0
Total votes		5,578	100.0

3rd District general election, 2018
Party	Candidate	Votes	%
Democratic	Jeff Bridges (incumbent)	23,457	61.17
Republican	Toren Mushovic	14,891	38.83
Total votes		38,348	100.0
Democratic hold			

=== District 4 ===
Democratic primary
Party	Candidate	Votes	%
Democratic	Serena Gonzales-Gutierrez	7,706	58.23
Democratic	Amy W. Beatie	4,346	32.84
Democratic	Ed Britt	1,182	8.93
Total votes		13,234	100.0

Republican primary
Party	Candidate	Votes	%
Republican	Robert "Dave" John	1,529	100.0
Total votes		1,529	100.0

4th District general election, 2018
Party	Candidate	Votes	%
Democratic	Serena Gonzales-Gutierrez	27,564	82.73
Republican	Robert "Dave" John	5,756	17.27
Total votes		33,320	100.0
Democratic hold			

=== District 5 ===
Democratic primary
Party	Candidate	Votes	%
Democratic	Alex Valdez	4,666	42.03
Democratic	Meghan Nutting	3,245	29.23
Democratic	Joel Judd	1,844	16.61
Democratic	Nicky Yollick	1,347	12.13
Total votes		11,102	100.0

Republican primary
Party	Candidate	Votes	%
Republican	Katherine E. Whitney	1,419	100.0
Total votes		1,419	100.0

5th District general election, 2018
Party	Candidate	Votes	%
Democratic	Alex Valdez	27,131	79.03
Republican	Katherine E. Whitney	6,136	17.87
Libertarian	Rory Lamberton	1,061	3.09
Total votes		34,328	100.0
Democratic hold			

=== District 6 ===
Democratic primary
Party	Candidate	Votes	%
Democratic	Chris Hansen (incumbent)	15,512	100.0
Total votes		15,512	100.0

6th District general election, 2018
Party	Candidate	Votes	%
Democratic	Chris Hansen (incumbent)	32,899	100.0
Total votes		32,899	100.0
Democratic hold			

=== District 7 ===
Democratic primary
Party	Candidate	Votes	%
Democratic	James Rashad Coleman (incumbent)	10,861	100.0
Total votes		10,861	100.0

Republican primary
Party	Candidate	Votes	%
Republican	Jay Frank Kucera	1,422	100.0
Total votes		1,422	100.0

7th District general election, 2018
Party	Candidate	Votes	%
Democratic	James Rashad Coleman (incumbent)	27,272	83.63
Republican	Jay Frank Kucera	5,338	16.37
Total votes		32,610	100.0
Democratic hold			

=== District 8 ===
Democratic primary
Party	Candidate	Votes	%
Democratic	Leslie Herod (incumbent)	18,699	100.0
Total votes		18,699	100.0

8th District general election, 2018
Party	Candidate	Votes	%
Democratic	Leslie Herod (incumbent)	39,517	100.0
Total votes		39,517	100.0
Democratic hold			

=== District 9 ===
Republican primary
Party	Candidate	Votes	%
Republican	Bob Lane	2,927	69.86
Republican	Angel Christine Saunders	1,263	30.14
Total votes		4,190	100.0

Democratic primary
Party	Candidate	Votes	%
Democratic	Emily Sirota	7,444	55.33
Democratic	Ashley Wheeland	6,011	44.67
Total votes		13,455	100.0

9th District general election, 2018
Party	Candidate	Votes	%
Democratic	Emily Sirota	27,265	71.88
Republican	Bob Lane	10,666	28.12
Total votes		37,931	100.0
Democratic hold			

=== District 10 ===
Republican primary
Party	Candidate	Votes	%
Republican	Murl S. Hendrickson IV	1,658	100.0
Total votes		1,658	100.0

Democratic primary
Party	Candidate	Votes	%
Democratic	Edie Hooton (incumbent)	13,011	100.0
Total votes		13,011	100.0

10th District general election, 2018
Party	Candidate	Votes	%
Democratic	Edie Hooton (incumbent)	36,310	86.82
Republican	Murl S. Hendrickson IV	5,513	13.18
Total votes		41,823	100.0
Democratic hold			

=== District 11 ===
Republican primary
Party	Candidate	Votes	%
Republican	Brian O. Donahue	4,943	100.0
Total votes		4,943	100.0

Democratic primary
Party	Candidate	Votes	%
Democratic	Jonathan Singer (incumbent)	10,863	100.0
Total votes		10,863	100.0

11th District general election, 2018
Party	Candidate	Votes	%
Democratic	Jonathan Singer (incumbent)	27,545	67.28
Republican	Brian O'Donahue	13,394	32.72
Total votes		40,939	100.0
Democratic hold			

=== District 12 ===
Democratic primary
Party	Candidate	Votes	%
Democratic	Sonya Jaquez Lewis	13,130	100.0
Total votes		13,130	100.0

Republican primary
Party	Candidate	Votes	%
Republican	David Reid Ross	4,052	100.0
Total votes		4,052	100.0

12th District general election, 2018
Party	Candidate	Votes	%
Democratic	Sonya Jaquez Lewis	30,880	73.54
Independent	Theresa Stets (Note: Listed on ballot as "Unaffiliated.")	11,110	26.46
Total votes		41,990	100.0
Democratic hold			

=== District 13 ===
Democratic primary
Party	Candidate	Votes	%
Democratic	K.C. Becker (incumbent)	12,148	100.0
Total votes		12,148	100.0

Republican primary
Party	Candidate	Votes	%
Republican	Kevin Sipple	3,797	100.0
Total votes		3,797	100.0

13th District general election, 2018
Party	Candidate	Votes	%
Democratic	K.C. Becker (incumbent)	32,499	73.15
Republican	Kevin Sipple	11,929	26.85
Total votes		44,428	100.0
Democratic hold			

=== District 14 ===
Democratic primary
Party	Candidate	Votes	%
Democratic	Paul J. Haddick	4,320	100.0
Total votes		4,320	100.0

Republican primary
Party	Candidate	Votes	%
Republican	Shane Sandridge (incumbent)	7,903	61.76
Republican	Kanda Calef	4,893	38.24
Total votes		12,796	100.0

14th District general election, 2018
Party	Candidate	Votes	%
Republican	Shane Sandridge (incumbent)	27,765	68.47
Democratic	Paul J. Haddick	12,787	31.53
Total votes		40,552	100.0
Republican hold			

=== District 15 ===
Democratic primary
Party	Candidate	Votes	%
Democratic	Brenda Krause	3,825	100.0
Total votes		3,825	100.0

Republican primary
Party	Candidate	Votes	%
Republican	Dave Williams (incumbent)	8,000	100.0
Total votes		8,000	100.0

15th District general election, 2018
Party	Candidate	Votes	%
Republican	Dave Williams (incumbent)	20,499	61.42
Democratic	Brenda Krause	12,874	38.58
Total votes		33,373	100.0
Republican hold			

=== District 16 ===
Republican primary
Party	Candidate	Votes	%
Republican	Larry G. Liston (incumbent)	8,357	100.0
Total votes		8,357	100.0

Democratic primary
Party	Candidate	Votes	%
Democratic	Andrew Smith	4,652	100.0
Total votes		4,652	100.0

16th District general election, 2018
Party	Candidate	Votes	%
Republican	Larry G. Liston (incumbent)	20,177	59.31
Democratic	Andrew Smith	12,484	36.69
Libertarian	John Hjersman	1,360	4.00
Total votes		34,021	100.0
Republican hold			

=== District 17 ===
Democratic primary
Party	Candidate	Votes	%
Democratic	Thomas "Tony" Exum, Sr. (incumbent)	3,618	100.0
Total votes		3,618	100.0

Republican primary
Party	Candidate	Votes	%
Republican	Kit Roupe	3,565	100.0
Total votes		3,565	100.0

17th District general election, 2018
Party	Candidate	Votes	%
Democratic	Thomas "Tony" Exum, Sr. (incumbent)	11,037	58.76
Republican	Kit Roupe	7,745	41.24
Total votes		18,782	100.0
Democratic hold			

=== District 18 ===
Republican primary
Party	Candidate	Votes	%
Republican	Jillian Likness (Note: Republican nominee Jillian Likness withdrew after the primary and was replaced by Mary Elizabeth Fabian for the general election.)	5,938	100.0
Total votes		5,938	100.0

Democratic primary
Party	Candidate	Votes	%
Democratic	Marc A. Snyder	5,279	55.04
Democratic	Terry Martinez	4,312	44.96
Total votes		9,591	100.0

18th District general election, 2018
Party	Candidate	Votes	%
Democratic	Marc A. Snyder	20,778	57.52
Republican	Mary Elizabeth Fabian	12,853	35.58
Independent	Maile Foster	2,489	6.89
Total votes		36,120	100.0
Democratic hold			

=== District 19 ===
Republican primary
Party	Candidate	Votes	%
Republican	Tim Geitner	15,970	100.0
Total votes		15,970	100.0

Democratic primary
Party	Candidate	Votes	%
Democratic	Asia M. Zanders	4,292	100.0
Total votes		4,292	100.0

19th District general election, 2018
Party	Candidate	Votes	%
Republican	Tim Geitner	36,828	75.94
Democratic	Asia M. Zanders	11,667	24.06
Total votes		48,495	100.0
Republican hold			

=== District 20 ===
Republican primary
Party	Candidate	Votes	%
Republican	Terri Carver (incumbent)	10,177	100.0
Total votes		10,177	100.0

Democratic primary
Party	Candidate	Votes	%
Democratic	Kent Edward Jarnig	5,434	100.0
Total votes		5,434	100.0

20th District general election, 2018
Party	Candidate	Votes	%
Republican	Terri Carver (incumbent)	23,479	62.85
Democratic	Kent Edward Jarnig	13,881	37.15
Total votes		37,360	100.0
Republican hold			

=== District 21 ===
Republican primary
Party	Candidate	Votes	%
Republican	Lois Landgraf (incumbent)	3,999	65.53
Republican	Raymond Garcia	2,104	34.47
Total votes		6,103	100.0

Democratic primary
Party	Candidate	Votes	%
Democratic	Liz Rosenbaum	3,023	100.0
Total votes		3,023	100.0

21st District general election, 2018
Party	Candidate	Votes	%
Republican	Lois Landgraf (incumbent)	12,529	58.57
Democratic	Liz Rosenbaum	8,863	41.43
Total votes		21,392	100.0
Republican hold			

=== District 22 ===
Democratic primary
Party	Candidate	Votes	%
Democratic	Todd Kastetter	7,458	100.0
Total votes		7,458	100.0

Republican primary
Party	Candidate	Votes	%
Republican	Colin Larson	5,055	50.70
Republican	Frank Francone	4,916	49.30
Total votes		9,971	100.0

22nd District general election, 2018
Party	Candidate	Votes	%
Republican	Colin Larson	23,064	53.63
Democratic	Todd Kastetter	19,939	46.37
Total votes		43,003	100.0
Republican hold			

=== District 23 ===
Democratic primary
Party	Candidate	Votes	%
Democratic	Chris Kennedy (incumbent)	9,539	100.0
Total votes		9,539	100.0

Republican primary
Party	Candidate	Votes	%
Republican	Joan Poston	5,509	100.0
Total votes		5,509	100.0

23rd District general election, 2018
Party	Candidate	Votes	%
Democratic	Chris Kennedy (incumbent)	25,414	62.87
Republican	Joan Poston	15,011	37.13
Total votes		40,425	100.0
Democratic hold			

=== District 24 ===
Democratic primary
Party	Candidate	Votes	%
Democratic	Monica Duran	6,636	54.59
Democratic	Kris Teegardin	5,520	45.41
Total votes		12,156	100.0

Republican primary
Party	Candidate	Votes	%
Republican	Arthur Erwin	5,656	100.0
Total votes		5,656	100.0

24th District general election, 2018
Party	Candidate	Votes	%
Democratic	Monica Duran	25,987	63.49
Republican	Arthur Erwin	14,945	36.51
Total votes		40,932	100.0
Democratic hold			

=== District 25 ===
Democratic primary
Party	Candidate	Votes	%
Democratic	Lisa A. Cutter	9,652	100.0
Total votes		9,652	100.0

Republican primary
Party	Candidate	Votes	%
Republican	Tim Leonard (incumbent) (Note: Incumbent Republican Tim Leonard withdrew after the primary and was replaced by Steve Szutenbach for the Republicans in the general election.)	7,936	100.0
Total votes		7,936	100.0

25th District general election, 2018
Party	Candidate	Votes	%
Democratic	Lisa A. Cutter	25,968	52.74
Republican	Steve Szutenbach	23,267	47.26
Total votes		49,235	100.0
Democratic gain from Republican			

=== District 26 ===
Republican primary
Party	Candidate	Votes	%
Republican	Nicki Mills (Note: Votes cast for withdrawn Republican candidate John D. Rosenfeld in State Representative - District 26--Republican will be counted for replacement Republican candidate Nicki Mills.)	3,324	100.0
Total votes		3,324	100.0

Democratic primary
Party	Candidate	Votes	%
Democratic	Dylan Roberts (incumbent)	6,505	100.0
Total votes		6,505	100.0

26th District general election, 2018
Party	Candidate	Votes	%
Democratic	Dylan Roberts (incumbent)	20,761	60.38
Republican	Nicki Mills	12,584	36.60
Independent	Luke Bray	1,039	3.02
Total votes		34,384	100.0
Democratic hold			

=== District 27 ===
Republican primary
Party	Candidate	Votes	%
Republican	Lang Sias (incumbent) (Note: Incumbent Republican Lang Sias withdrew after the primary and was replaced by Vicki Pyne for the Republicans in the general election.)	8,547	100.0
Total votes		8,547	100.0

Democratic primary
Party	Candidate	Votes	%
Democratic	Brianna Titone	9,893	100.0
Total votes		9,893	100.0

27th District general election, 2018
Party	Candidate	Votes	%
Democratic	Brianna Titone	24,957	50.44
Republican	Vicki Pyne	24,518	49.56
Total votes		49,475	100.0
Democratic gain from Republican			

=== District 28 ===
Democratic primary
Party	Candidate	Votes	%
Democratic	Kerry Tipper	6,829	66.11
Democratic	Shakti	3,500	33.89
Total votes		10,329	100.0

Republican primary
Party	Candidate	Votes	%
Republican	Kristina Joy Alley	5,242	100.0
Total votes		5,242	100.0

28th District general election, 2018
Party	Candidate	Votes	%
Democratic	Kerry Tipper	22,286	58.69
Republican	Kristina Joy Alley	14,419	37.97
Libertarian	Ross Klopf	1,265	3.33
Total votes		37,970	100.0
Democratic hold			

=== District 29 ===
Democratic primary
Party	Candidate	Votes	%
Democratic	Tracy Kraft-Tharp (incumbent)	8,345	100.0
Total votes		8,345	100.0

Republican primary
Party	Candidate	Votes	%
Republican	Grady Nouis	5,258	100.0
Total votes		5,258	100.0

29th District general election, 2018
Party	Candidate	Votes	%
Democratic	Tracy Kraft-Tharp (incumbent)	22,100	58.30
Republican	Grady Nouis	14,169	37.38
Libertarian	Hans V. Romer	1,637	4.32
Total votes		37,906	100.0
Democratic hold			

=== District 30 ===
Democratic primary
Party	Candidate	Votes	%
Democratic	Dafna Michaelson Jenet (incumbent)	5,211	100.0
Total votes		5,211	100.0

Republican primary
Party	Candidate	Votes	%
Republican	Susan Kochevar	3,369	100.0
Total votes		3,369	100.0

30th District general election, 2018
Party	Candidate	Votes	%
Democratic	Dafna Michaelson Jenet (incumbent)	16,239	58.06
Republican	Susan Kochevar	11,729	41.94
Total votes		27,968	100.0
Democratic hold			

=== District 31 ===
Democratic primary
Party	Candidate	Votes	%
Democratic	Yadira Caraveo	6,049	100.0
Total votes		6,049	100.0

Republican primary
Party	Candidate	Votes	%
Republican	Rico Figueroa	3,840	100.0
Total votes		3,840	100.0

31st District general election, 2018
Party	Candidate	Votes	%
Democratic	Yadira Caraveo	16,242	55.02
Republican	Rico Figueroa	11,397	38.61
Libertarian	Bree Owens	1,883	6.38
Total votes		29,522	100.0
Democratic hold			

=== District 32 ===
Democratic primary
Party	Candidate	Votes	%
Democratic	Adrienne Benavidez (incumbent)	5,049	100.0
Total votes		5,049	100.0

Republican primary
Party	Candidate	Votes	%
Republican	Kim Bishop	2,067	100.0
Total votes		2,067	100.0

32nd District general election, 2018
Party	Candidate	Votes	%
Democratic	Adrienne Benavidez (incumbent)	16,644	100.0
Total votes		16,644	100.0
Democratic hold			

=== District 33 ===
Democratic primary
Party	Candidate	Votes	%
Democratic	Matt Gray (incumbent)	11,865	100.0
Total votes		11,865	100.0

Republican primary
Party	Candidate	Votes	%
Republican	Eric Rutherford	6,322	100.0
Total votes		6,322	100.0

33rd District general election, 2018
Party	Candidate	Votes	%
Democratic	Matt Gray (incumbent)	27,833	57.29
Republican	Eric Rutherford	17,332	35.68
Independent	Jay Geyer	2,087	4.30
Libertarian	Kim Tavendale	1,327	2.73
Total votes		48,579	100.0
Democratic hold			

=== District 34 ===
Democratic primary
Party	Candidate	Votes	%
Democratic	Kyle Mullica	3,614	54.56
Democratic	Jacque Phillips	3,010	45.44
Total votes		6,624	100.0

Republican primary
Party	Candidate	Votes	%
Republican	Alexander "Skinny" Winkler (incumbent)	3,383	100.0
Total votes		3,383	100.0

34th District general election, 2018
Party	Candidate	Votes	%
Democratic	Kyle Mullica	16,039	60.29
Republican	Alexander "Skinny" Winkler (incumbent)	10,565	39.71
Total votes		26,604	100.0
Democratic gain from Republican			

=== District 35 ===
Republican primary
Party	Candidate	Votes	%
Republican	Bruce Baker	4,585	100.0
Total votes		4,585	100.0

Democratic primary
Party	Candidate	Votes	%
Democratic	Shannon Bird	8,042	100.0
Total votes		8,042	100.0

35th District general election, 2018
Party	Candidate	Votes	%
Democratic	Shannon Bird	20,272	59.33
Republican	Bruce Baker	12,645	37.01
Libertarian	Ken Biles	1,251	3.66
Total votes		34,168	100.0
Democratic hold			

=== District 36 ===
Republican primary
Party	Candidate	Votes	%
Republican	Richard J. Bowman	4,104	100.0
Total votes		4,104	100.0

Democratic primary
Party	Candidate	Votes	%
Democratic	Mike Weissman (incumbent)	6,248	100.0
Total votes		6,248	100.0

36th District general election, 2018
Party	Candidate	Votes	%
Democratic	Mike Weissman (incumbent)	18,994	61.01
Republican	Richard J. Bowman	12,140	38.99
Total votes		31,134	100.0
Democratic hold			

=== District 37 ===
Democratic primary
Party	Candidate	Votes	%
Democratic	Tom Sullivan	7,624	100.0
Total votes		7,624	100.0

Republican primary
Party	Candidate	Votes	%
Republican	Cole Wist (incumbent)	6,729	100.0
Total votes		6,729	100.0

37th District general election, 2018
Party	Candidate	Votes	%
Democratic	Tom Sullivan	21,686	54.03
Republican	Cole Wist (incumbent)	18,451	45.97
Total votes		40,137	100.0
Democratic gain from Republican			

=== District 38 ===
Republican primary
Party	Candidate	Votes	%
Republican	Susan Beckman (incumbent)	9,564	100.0
Total votes		9,564	100.0

Democratic primary
Party	Candidate	Votes	%
Democratic	Chris Kolker	10,109	100.0
Total votes		10,109	100.0

38th District general election, 2018
Party	Candidate	Votes	%
Republican	Susan Beckman (incumbent)	24,164	50.39
Democratic	Chris Kolker	23,790	49.61
Total votes		47,954	100.0
Republican hold			

=== District 39 ===
Republican primary
Party	Candidate	Votes	%
Republican	Mark Baisley	10,079	100.0
Total votes		10,079	100.0

Democratic primary
Party	Candidate	Votes	%
Democratic	Kamala Vanderkolk	5,601	100.0
Total votes		5,601	100.0

39th District general election, 2018
Party	Candidate	Votes	%
Republican	Mark Baisley	29,289	62.61
Democratic	Kamala Vanderkolk	16,167	34.56
Libertarian	Tony Gross	1,325	2.83
Total votes		46,781	100.0
Republican hold			

=== District 40 ===
Republican primary
Party	Candidate	Votes	%
Republican	Richard Allen Bassett	4,641	100.0
Total votes		4,641	100.0

Democratic primary
Party	Candidate	Votes	%
Democratic	Janet Buckner (incumbent)	7,031	100.0
Total votes		7,031	100.0

40th District general election, 2018
Party	Candidate	Votes	%
Democratic	Janet Buckner (incumbent)	20,731	63.06
Republican	Richard Allen Bassett	12,146	36.94
Total votes		32,877	100.0
Democratic hold			

=== District 41 ===
Democratic primary
Party	Candidate	Votes	%
Democratic	Jovan Melton (incumbent)	8,090	100.0
Total votes		8,090	100.0

Republican primary
Party	Candidate	Votes	%
Republican	Dahlia Jean Weinstein	4,320	100.0
Total votes		4,320	100.0

41st District general election, 2018
Party	Candidate	Votes	%
Democratic	Jovan Melton (incumbent)	19,773	64.42
Republican	Lynn Myers	10,923	35.58
Total votes		30,696	100.0
Democratic hold			

=== District 42 ===
Republican primary
Party	Candidate	Votes	%
Republican	Mike Donald	2,039	100.0
Total votes		2,039	100.0

Democratic primary
Party	Candidate	Votes	%
Democratic	Dominique Jackson (incumbent)	4,984	100.0
Total votes		4,984	100.0

42nd District general election, 2018
Party	Candidate	Votes	%
Democratic	Dominique Jackson (incumbent)	14,419	73.35
Republican	Mike Donald	5,240	26.65
Total votes		19,659	100.0
Democratic hold			

=== District 43 ===
Democratic primary
Party	Candidate	Votes	%
Democratic	Barrett Rothe	6,815	100.0
Total votes		6,815	100.0

Republican primary
Party	Candidate	Votes	%
Republican	Kevin Van Winkle (incumbent)	6,644	100.0
Total votes		6,644	100.0

43rd District general election, 2018
Party	Candidate	Votes	%
Republican	Kevin Van Winkle (incumbent)	22,764	53.36
Democratic	Barrett Rothe	19,027	44.60
Unity	Scott Wagner (Note: Listed on ballot as "Unity Party of Colorado.")	874	2.05
Total votes		42,665	100.0
Republican hold			

=== District 44 ===
Democratic primary
Party	Candidate	Votes	%
Democratic	Simone Aiken	5,850	100.0
Total votes		5,850	100.0

Republican primary
Party	Candidate	Votes	%
Republican	Kim Ransom (incumbent)	7,138	100.0
Total votes		7,138	100.0

44th District general election, 2018
Party	Candidate	Votes	%
Republican	Kim Ransom (incumbent)	25,654	57.79
Democratic	Simone Aiken	18,741	42.21
Total votes		44,395	100.0
Republican hold			

=== District 45 ===
Democratic primary
Party	Candidate	Votes	%
Democratic	Danielle Kombo	4,141	63.86
Democratic	Michael Hupp	2,344	36.14
Total votes		6,485	100.0

Republican primary
Party	Candidate	Votes	%
Republican	Patrick Neville (incumbent)	8,454	100.0
Total votes		8,454	100.0

45th District general election, 2018
Party	Candidate	Votes	%
Republican	Patrick Neville (incumbent)	30,865	62.42
Democratic	Danielle Kombo	18,581	37.58
Total votes		49,446	100.0
Republican hold			

=== District 46 ===
Republican primary
Party	Candidate	Votes	%
Republican	Jonathan Ambler	291	100.0
Total votes		291	100.0

Democratic primary
Party	Candidate	Votes	%
Democratic	Daneya Esgar (incumbent)	9,343	100.0
Total votes		9,343	100.0

46th District general election, 2018
Party	Candidate	Votes	%
Democratic	Daneya Esgar (incumbent)	20,556	58.74
Republican	Jonathan Ambler	14,436	41.26
Total votes		34,992	100.0
Democratic hold			

=== District 47 ===
Republican primary
Party	Candidate	Votes	%
Republican	Don Bendell	4,352	56.40
Republican	Judy Rydberg Reyher (incumbent)	3,364	43.60
Total votes		7,716	100.0

Democratic primary
Party	Candidate	Votes	%
Democratic	Bri Buentello	6,572	100.0
Total votes		6,572	100.0

47th District general election, 2018
Party	Candidate	Votes	%
Democratic	Bri Buentello	16,324	50.50
Republican	Don Bendell	16,003	49.50
Total votes		32,327	100.0
Democratic gain from Republican			

=== District 48 ===
Democratic primary
Party	Candidate	Votes	%
Democratic	Gbenga Ajiboye	4,721	100.0
Total votes		4,721	100.0

Republican primary
Party	Candidate	Votes	%
Republican	Stephen Alan Humphrey (incumbent)	9,075	100.0
Total votes		9,075	100.0

48th District general election, 2018
Party	Candidate	Votes	%
Republican	Stephen Alan Humphrey (incumbent)	29,393	67.79
Democratic	Gbenga Ajiboye	13,967	32.21
Total votes		43,360	100.0
Republican hold			

=== District 49 ===
Republican primary
Party	Candidate	Votes	%
Republican	Perry L. Buck (incumbent)	11,223	100.0
Total votes		11,223	100.0

Democratic primary
Party	Candidate	Votes	%
Democratic	Conor Duffy	8,515	100.0
Total votes		8,515	100.0

49th District general election, 2018
Party	Candidate	Votes	%
Republican	Perry L. Buck (incumbent)	33,867	59.23
Democratic	Conor Duffy	23,312	40.77
Total votes		57,179	100.0
Republican hold			

=== District 50 ===
Democratic primary
Party	Candidate	Votes	%
Democratic	Rochelle Galindo	2,456	58.41
Democratic	Jim Riesberg	1,749	41.59
Total votes		4,205	100.0

Republican primary
Party	Candidate	Votes	%
Republican	Michael A. Thuener	3,293	100.0
Total votes		3,293	100.0

50th District general election, 2018
Party	Candidate	Votes	%
Democratic	Rochelle Galindo	12,159	53.37
Republican	Michael A. Thuener	10,624	46.63
Total votes		22,783	100.0
Democratic hold			

=== District 51 ===
Republican primary
Party	Candidate	Votes	%
Republican	Hugh McKean (incumbent)	8,954	100.0
Total votes		8,954	100.0

Democratic primary
Party	Candidate	Votes	%
Democratic	Joan Shaffer	7,734	100.0
Total votes		7,734	100.0

51st District general election, 2018
Party	Candidate	Votes	%
Republican	Hugh McKean (incumbent)	24,745	56.16
Democratic	Joan Shaffer	19,320	43.84
Total votes		44,065	100.0
Republican hold			

=== District 52 ===
Democratic primary
Party	Candidate	Votes	%
Democratic	Joann Ginal (incumbent)	11,684	100.0
Total votes		11,684	100.0

Republican primary
Party	Candidate	Votes	%
Republican	Donna Walter	5,497	100.0
Total votes		5,497	100.0

52nd District general election, 2018
Party	Candidate	Votes	%
Democratic	Joann Ginal (incumbent)	29,708	64.13
Republican	Donna Walter	16,614	35.87
Total votes		46,322	100.0
Democratic hold			

=== District 53 ===
Democratic primary
Party	Candidate	Votes	%
Democratic	Jeni Arndt (incumbent)	9,291	100.0
Total votes		9,291	100.0

53rd District general election, 2018
Party	Candidate	Votes	%
Democratic	Jeni Arndt (incumbent)	29,904	100.0
Total votes		29,904	100.0
Democratic hold			

=== District 54 ===
Democratic primary
Party	Candidate	Votes	%
Democratic	Erin Shipp	3,868	100.0
Total votes		3,868	100.0

Republican primary
Party	Candidate	Votes	%
Republican	Matt Soper	9,289	100.0
Total votes		9,289	100.0

54th District general election, 2018
Party	Candidate	Votes	%
Republican	Matt Soper	22,236	66.01
Independent	Thea Chase	11,449	33.99
Total votes		33,685	100.0
Republican hold			

=== District 55 ===
Republican primary
Party	Candidate	Votes	%
Republican	Janice Rich	9,416	100.0
Total votes		9,416	100.0

Democratic primary
Party	Candidate	Votes	%
Democratic	Tanya Travis	5,466	100.0
Total votes		5,466	100.0

55th District general election, 2018
Party	Candidate	Votes	%
Republican	Janice Rich	22,470	62.64
Democratic	Tanya Travis	13,401	37.36
Total votes		35,871	100.0
Republican hold			

=== District 56 ===
Republican primary
Party	Candidate	Votes	%
Republican	Rod Bockenfeld	5,732	61.91
Republican	Phil Covarrubias (incumbent)	3,526	38.09
Total votes		9,258	100.0

Democratic primary
Party	Candidate	Votes	%
Democratic	Dave Rose	6,586	100.0
Total votes		6,586	100.0

56th District general election, 2018
Party	Candidate	Votes	%
Republican	Rod Bockenfeld	25,702	55.97
Democratic	Dave Rose	18,674	40.67
Libertarian	Kevin Gulbranson	1,542	3.36
Total votes		45,918	100.0
Republican hold			

=== District 57 ===
Republican primary
Party	Candidate	Votes	%
Republican	Bob Rankin (incumbent)	7,292	100.0
Total votes		7,292	100.0

Democratic primary
Party	Candidate	Votes	%
Democratic	Colin Wilhelm	4,226	100.0
Total votes		4,226	100.0

57th District general election, 2018
Party	Candidate	Votes	%
Republican	Bob Rankin (incumbent)	19,691	62.10
Democratic	Colin Wilhelm	12,016	37.90
Total votes		31,707	100.0
Republican hold			

=== District 58 ===
Democratic primary
Party	Candidate	Votes	%
Democratic	Seth Cagin	5,039	100.0
Total votes		5,039	100.0

Republican primary
Party	Candidate	Votes	%
Republican	Marc Catlin (incumbent)	9,141	100.0
Total votes		9,141	100.0

58th District general election, 2018
Party	Candidate	Votes	%
Republican	Marc Catlin (incumbent)	21,912	62.81
Democratic	Seth Cagin	12,972	37.19
Total votes		34,884	100.0
Republican hold			

=== District 59 ===
Democratic primary
Party	Candidate	Votes	%
Democratic	Barbara McLachlan (incumbent)	8,059	100.0
Total votes		8,059	100.0

59th District general election, 2018
Party	Candidate	Votes	%
Democratic	Barbara McLachlan (incumbent)	23,273	56.02
Independent	Paul Jones	18,273	43.98
Total votes		41,546	100.0
Democratic hold			

=== District 60 ===
Democratic primary
Party	Candidate	Votes	%
Democratic	Erin Kelley	5,973	100.0
Total votes		5,973	100.0

Republican primary
Party	Candidate	Votes	%
Republican	James D. "Jim" Wilson (incumbent)	11,644	100.0
Total votes		11,644	100.0

60th District general election, 2018
Party	Candidate	Votes	%
Republican	James D. "Jim" Wilson (incumbent)	23,468	59.81
Democratic	Erin Kelley	14,426	36.77
Libertarian	Glenn Ingalls	1,343	3.42
Total votes		39,237	100.0
Republican hold			

=== District 61 ===
Democratic primary
Party	Candidate	Votes	%
Democratic	Julie McCluskie	8,208	100.0
Total votes		8,208	100.0

Republican primary
Party	Candidate	Votes	%
Republican	Mike Mason	5,010	100.0
Total votes		5,010	100.0

61st District general election, 2018
Party	Candidate	Votes	%
Democratic	Julie McCluskie	26,063	63.60
Republican	Mike Mason	14,915	36.40
Total votes		40,978	100.0
Democratic hold			

=== District 62 ===
Democratic primary
Party	Candidate	Votes	%
Democratic	Don Valdez	8,467	100.0
Total votes		8,467	100.0

- The Colorado Secretary of State's website does not report any votes for the Republicans in the 62nd House district Primary election.

62nd District general election, 2018
Party	Candidate	Votes	%
Democratic	Don Valdez (incumbent)	17,752	56.78
Republican	Scott Honeycutt	13,512	43.22
Total votes		31,264	100.0
Democratic hold			

=== District 63 ===
Democratic primary
Party	Candidate	Votes	%
Democratic	Brandon D. Bobian	5,136	100.0
Total votes		5,136	100.0

Republican primary
Party	Candidate	Votes	%
Republican	Lori A. Saine (incumbent)	7,625	100.0
Total votes		7,625	100.0

63rd District general election, 2018
Party	Candidate	Votes	%
Republican	Lori A. Saine (incumbent)	25,816	59.73
Democratic	Brandon D. Bobian	15,346	35.51
Libertarian	Joe Johnson	2,060	4.77
Total votes		43,222	100.0
Republican hold			

=== District 64 ===
Democratic primary
Party	Candidate	Votes	%
Democratic	Teri Nilson Baird	4,333	100.0
Total votes		4,333	100.0

Republican primary
Party	Candidate	Votes	%
Republican	Kimmi Lewis (incumbent)	12,496	100.0
Total votes		12,496	100.0

64th District general election, 2018
Party	Candidate	Votes	%
Republican	Kimmi Lewis (incumbent)	26,149	75.14
Democratic	Teri Nilson Baird	8,651	24.86
Total votes		34,800	100.0
Republican hold			

=== District 65 ===
Democratic primary
Party	Candidate	Votes	%
Democratic	Bethleen McCall	2,812	100.0
Total votes		2,812	100.0

Republican primary
Party	Candidate	Votes	%
Republican	Rod Pelton	11,455	100.0
Total votes		11,455	100.0

65th District general election, 2018
Party	Candidate	Votes	%
Republican	Rod Pelton	22,746	76.30
Democratic	Bethleen McCall	7,065	23.70
Total votes		29,811	100.0
Republican hold			

== See also ==
- United States elections, 2018
- United States House of Representatives elections in Colorado, 2018
- Colorado elections, 2018
- Colorado gubernatorial election, 2018
- Colorado Attorney General election, 2018
- Colorado Secretary of State election, 2018
- Colorado State Treasurer election, 2018
- Colorado State Board of Education election, 2018
- Regents of the University of Colorado election, 2018
- Colorado State Senate election, 2018
- Elections in Colorado
