= 2020 Colorado House of Representatives election =

- November 3, 2020

All 65 seats in the Colorado House of Representatives 33 seats needed for a majority
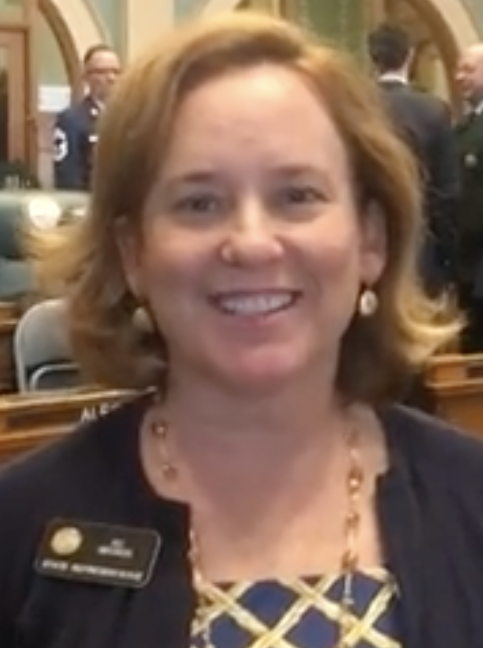

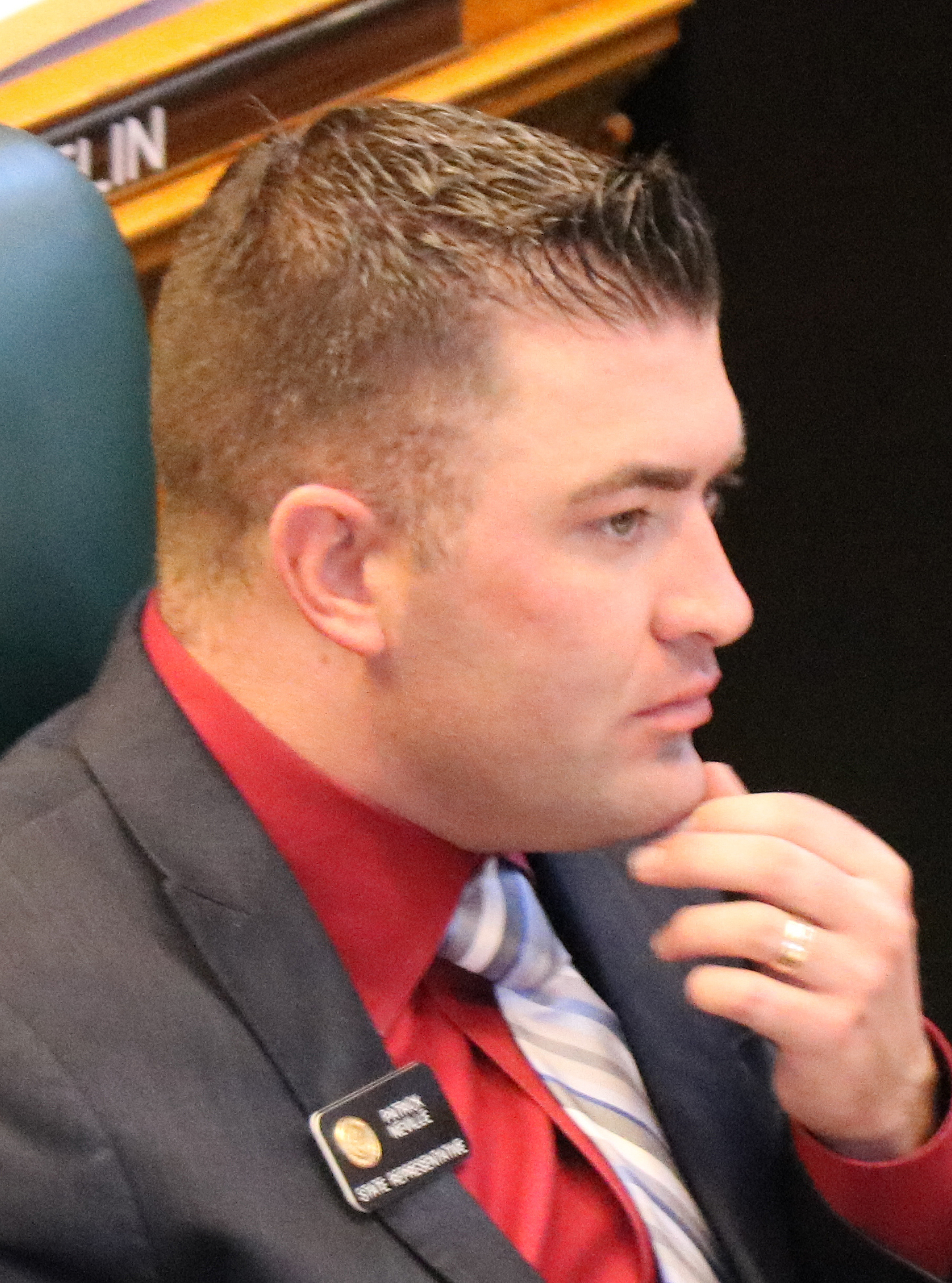
	Majority party	Minority party
Leader	KC Becker (term-limited)	Patrick Neville
Party	Democratic	Republican
Leader's seat	13th	45th
Last election	41 seats, 54.80%	24 seats, 42.53%
Seats before	41	24
Seats won	41	24
Seat change	Steady	Steady
Popular vote	1,642,008	1,331,774
Percentage	53.90%	43.72%
Swing	▼0.90 pp	▲1.19 pp
- Democratic hold Democratic gain Republican hold Republican gain 50–60% 60–70% 70–80% >90% 40–50% 50–60% 60–70% 70–80% 80–90% >90%
Speaker before election
KC Becker
Democratic
Elected Speaker
Alec Garnett
Democratic

The 2020 Colorado House of Representatives elections took place on November 3, 2020, with the primary elections held on June 30, 2020. Voters in all 65 districts of the state House elected their representative for a two-year term. It coincided with the state Senate elections and the biennial United States elections. The Democratic Party retained control of the House of Representatives. The Democrats gained the 38th District while the Republicans gained the 47th District, resulting in no net seat change.

== Background ==
In the previous state House election (2018), the Democrats increased their majority to 17 seats, gaining 5 seats, while the Republicans lost 5 seats. Therefore, for Democrats to have lost their absolute majority in the House in this election, Republicans and other parties would have needed to gain at least 9 more seats.

== Incumbents not seeking re-election ==
=== Term-limited incumbents ===
Four Democratic and five Republican incumbents are term-limited and prohibited from seeking a consecutive fifth term.

- KC Becker (D), District 13
- Perry Buck (R), District 49
- Stephen Humphrey (R), District 48
- Tracy Kraft-Tharp (D), District 29
- Lois Landgraf (R), District 21
- Jovan Melton (D), District 41
- Lori Saine (R), District 63
- Jonathan Singer (D), District 11
- James Wilson (R), District 60

=== Retiring incumbents ===
- Janet Buckner (D), District 40 (running for State Senate)
- James Coleman (D), District 7 (running for State Senate)
- Sonya Jaquez Lewis (D), District 12 (running for State Senate)
- Larry Liston (R), District 16 (running for State Senate)

== Predictions ==
Source	Ranking	As of
The Cook Political Report	Safe D	October 21, 2020

== Results ==
Colorado House of Representatives election, 2020 General election – November 3, 2020
Party	Votes	%	% +/-	Seats	Seats +/-
**Democratic**	**1,642,008**	**53.90**	**-0.90**	**41**	**±0**
Republican	1,331,774	43.72	+1.19	24	±0
Libertarian	70,239	2.31	+1.60	0	±0
Green	1,688	0.06	+0.06	0	±0
Unity	633	0.02	-0.02	0	±0
Valid votes	3,046,342	92.43	—	—	—
Blank and invalid votes	249,324	7.57	—	—	—
**Totals**	**3,295,666**	**100**	—	**80**	—
Registered voter/turnout	3,793,790	86.87			

Popular vote
Democratic	53.90%
Republican	43.72%
Libertarian	2.31%
Green	0.06%
Unity	0.02%

Seats
Democratic	63.08%
Republican	36.92%

District	Incumbent	Party	Elected	Party
1	Susan Lontine	Dem	Susan Lontine	Dem
2	Alec Garnett	Dem	Alec Garnett	Dem
3	Meg Froelich	Dem	Meg Froelich	Dem
4	Serena Gonzales-Gutierrez	Dem	Serena Gonzales-Gutierrez	Dem
5	Alex Valdez	Dem	Alex Valdez	Dem
6	Steven Woodrow	Dem	Steven Woodrow	Dem
7	James Coleman	Dem	Jennifer Bacon	Dem
8	Leslie Herod	Dem	Leslie Herod	Dem
9	Emily Sirota	Dem	Emily Sirota	Dem
10	Edie Hooton	Dem	Edie Hooton	Dem
11	Jonathan Singer	Dem	Karen McCormick	Dem
12	Sonya Jaquez Lewis	Dem	Tracey Bernett	Dem
13	KC Becker	Dem	Judy Amabile	Dem
14	Shane Sandridge	Rep	Shane Sandridge	Rep
15	Dave Williams	Rep	Dave Williams	Rep
16	Larry Liston	Rep	Andres G. Pico	Rep
17	Tony Exum	Dem	Tony Exum	Dem
18	Marc Snyder	Dem	Marc Snyder	Dem
19	Tim Geitner	Rep	Tim Geitner	Rep
20	Terri Carver	Rep	Terri Carver	Rep
21	Lois Landgraf	Rep	Mary Bradfield	Rep
22	Colin Larson	Rep	Colin Larson	Rep
23	Chris Kennedy	Dem	Chris Kennedy	Dem
24	Monica Duran	Dem	Monica Duran	Dem
25	Lisa Cutter	Dem	Lisa Cutter	Dem
26	Dylan Roberts	Dem	Dylan Roberts	Dem
27	Brianna Titone	Dem	Brianna Titone	Dem
28	Kerry Tipper	Dem	Kerry Tipper	Dem
29	Tracy Kraft-Tharp	Dem	Lindsey N. Daugherty	Dem
30	Dafna Michaelson Jenet	Dem	Dafna Michaelson Jenet	Dem
31	Yadira Caraveo	Dem	Yadira Caraveo	Dem
32	Adrienne Benavidez	Dem	Adrienne Benavidez	Dem
33	Matt Gray	Dem	Matt Gray	Dem
34	Kyle Mullica	Dem	Kyle Mullica	Dem
35	Shannon Bird	Dem	Shannon Bird	Dem
36	Mike Weissman	Dem	Mike Weissman	Dem
37	Tom Sullivan	Dem	Tom Sullivan	Dem
38	Richard Champion	Rep	**David Ortiz**	**Dem**
39	Mark Baisley	Rep	Mark Baisley	Rep
40	Janet Buckner	Dem	Naquetta Ricks	Dem
41	Jovan Melton	Dem	Iman Jodeh	Dem
42	Dominique Jackson	Dem	Dominique Jackson	Dem
43	Kevin Van Winkle	Rep	Kevin Van Winkle	Rep
44	Kim Ransom	Rep	Kim Ransom	Rep
45	Patrick Neville	Rep	Patrick Neville	Rep
46	Daneya Esgar	Dem	Daneya Esgar	Dem
47	Bri Buentello	Dem	**Stephanie Luck**	**Rep**
48	Stephen Humphrey	Rep	Tonya Van Beber	Rep
49	Perry Buck	Rep	Mike Lynch	Rep
50	Mary Young	Dem	Mary Young	Dem
51	Hugh McKean	Rep	Hugh McKean	Rep
52	Cathy Kipp	Dem	Cathy Kipp	Dem
53	Jennifer Arndt	Dem	Jennifer Arndt	Dem
54	Matt Soper	Rep	Matt Soper	Rep
55	Janice Rich	Rep	Janice Rich	Rep
56	Rod Bockenfeld	Rep	Rod Bockenfeld	Rep
57	Perry Will	Rep	Perry Will	Rep
58	Marc Catlin	Rep	Marc Catlin	Rep
59	Barbara McLachlan	Dem	Barbara McLachlan	Dem
60	James Wilson	Rep	Ron Hanks	Rep
61	Julie McCluskie	Dem	Julie McCluskie	Dem
62	Donald Valdez	Dem	Donald Valdez	Dem
63	Lori Saine	Rep	Dan Woog	Rep
64	Richard Holtorf	Rep	Richard Holtorf	Rep
65	Rod Pelton	Rep	Rod Pelton	Rep

Bold - Gain
Italicize - Hold, new member

=== Closest races ===
Seats where the margin of victory was under 10%:

1. **District 27, 3.11%**
2. **District 25, 5.64%**
3. **District 43, 5.72%**
4. **District 22, 5.73%**
5. **District 47, 9.18% gain**

== Detailed results ==
=== District 1 ===
1st District Democratic Primary
Party	Candidate	Votes	%
Democratic	Susan Lontine (incumbent)	11,644	100.0
Total votes		11,644	100.0

1st District Republican Primary
Party	Candidate	Votes	%
Republican	Samantha Koch	3,777	100.0
Total votes		3,777	100.0

2020 Colorado House of Representatives election, 1st district, 2020
Party	Candidate	Votes	%
Democratic	Susan Lontine (incumbent)	22,584	66.36
Republican	Samantha Koch	11,448	33.64
Total votes		34,032	100.0
Democratic hold			

=== District 2 ===
2nd District Democratic Primary
Party	Candidate	Votes	%
Democratic	Alec Garnett (incumbent)	25,709	100.0
Total votes		25,709	100.0

2nd District Republican Primary
Party	Candidate	Votes	%
Republican	Victoria Patridge	2,566	100.0
Total votes		2,566	100.0

2020 Colorado House of Representatives election,2nd District
Party	Candidate	Votes	%
Democratic	Alec Garnett (incumbent)	45,369	80.58
Republican	Victoria Patridge	10,935	19.42
Total votes		56,304	100.0
Democratic hold			

=== District 3 ===
3rd District Democratic Primary
Party	Candidate	Votes	%
Democratic	Meg Froelich (incumbent)	14,512	100.0
Total votes		14,512	100.0

3rd District Republican Primary
Party	Candidate	Votes	%
Republican	William S. Klocek	6,052	100.0
Total votes		6,052	100.0

2020 Colorado House of Representatives election, 3rd District
Party	Candidate	Votes	%
Democratic	Meg Froelich (incumbent)	28,071	59.11
Republican	Dean Titterington	18,008	37.92
Libertarian	David Jurist	1,411	2.97
Total votes		47,490	100.0
Democratic hold			

=== District 4 ===
4th District Democratic Primary
Party	Candidate	Votes	%
Democratic	Serena Gonzales-Gutierrez (incumbent)	18,856	100.0
Total votes		18,856	100.0

4th District Republican Primary
Party	Candidate	Votes	%
Republican	Grant Price	1,790	100.0
Total votes		1,790	100.0

2020 Colorado House of Representatives election, 4th District
Party	Candidate	Votes	%
Democratic	Serena Gonzales-Gutierrez (incumbent)	34,501	81.85
Republican	Grant Price	7,651	18.15
Total votes		42,152	100.0
Democratic hold			

=== District 5 ===
5th District Democratic Primary
Party	Candidate	Votes	%
Democratic	Alex Valdez (incumbent)	18,082	100.0
Total votes		18,082	100.0

5th District Republican Primary
Party	Candidate	Votes	%
Republican	Jonathan Woodley	1,781	100.0
Total votes		1,781	100.0

2020 Colorado House of Representatives election, 5th District
Party	Candidate	Votes	%
Democratic	Alex Valdez (incumbent)	37,132	79.06
Republican	Jonathan Woodley	9,203	19.59
Unity	Joe Richardson	633	1.35
Total votes		46,968	100.0
Democratic hold			

=== District 6 ===
6th District Democratic Primary
Party	Candidate	Votes	%
Democratic	Steven Woodrow (incumbent)	11,143	45.71
Democratic	Steven Paletz	7,560	31.01
Democratic	Dan Himelspach	5,673	23.27
Total votes		24,376	100.0

6th District Republican Primary
Party	Candidate	Votes	%
Republican	Bill McAleb	3,944	100.0
Total votes		3,944	100.0

2020 Colorado House of Representatives election, 6th District
Party	Candidate	Votes	%
Democratic	Steven Woodrow (incumbent)	36,302	71.86
Republican	Bill McAleb	12,711	25.16
Libertarian	Jeffrey Crowe	1,508	2.98
Total votes		50,521	100.0
Democratic hold			

=== District 7 ===
7th District Democratic Primary
Party	Candidate	Votes	%
Democratic	Jennifer Bacon	18,805	100.0
Total votes		18,805	100.0

2020 Colorado House of Representatives election, 7th District
Party	Candidate	Votes	%
Democratic	Jennifer Bacon	38,938	100.0
Total votes		38,938	100.0
Democratic hold			

=== District 8 ===
8th District Democratic Primary
Party	Candidate	Votes	%
Democratic	Leslie Herod (incumbent)	27,851	100.0
Total votes		27,851	100.0

2020 Colorado House of Representatives election, 8th District
Party	Candidate	Votes	%
Democratic	Leslie Herod (incumbent)	46,910	100.0
Total votes		46,910	100.0
Democratic hold			

=== District 9 ===
9th District Democratic Primary
Party	Candidate	Votes	%
Democratic	Emily Sirota (incumbent)	18,284	100.0
Total votes		18,284	100.0

9th District Republican Primary
Party	Candidate	Votes	%
Republican	Larry L. Braig	3,958	100.0
Total votes		3,958	100.0

2020 Colorado House of Representatives election, 9th District
Party	Candidate	Votes	%
Democratic	Emily Sirota (incumbent)	32,059	69.89
Republican	Larry L. Braig	12,438	27.12
Libertarian	Wes Pinchot	1,373	2.99
Total votes		45,870	100.0
Democratic hold			

=== District 10 ===
10th District Democratic Primary
Party	Candidate	Votes	%
Democratic	Edie Hooton (incumbent)	20,759	100.0
Total votes		20,759	100.0

10th District Republican Primary
Party	Candidate	Votes	%
Republican	Kenneth J. Stickney	1,782	100.0
Total votes		1,782	100.0

2020 Colorado House of Representatives election, 10th District
Party	Candidate	Votes	%
Democratic	Edie Hooton (incumbent)	39,269	85.36
Republican	Kenneth J. Stickney	6,733	14.64
Total votes		46,002	100.0
Democratic hold			

=== District 11 ===
11th District Democratic Primary
Party	Candidate	Votes	%
Democratic	Karen McCormick	17,470	100.0
Total votes		17,470	100.0

11th District Republican Primary
Party	Candidate	Votes	%
Republican	Mark Milliman	5,951	100.0
Total votes		5,951	100.0

2020 Colorado House of Representatives election, 11th District
Party	Candidate	Votes	%
Democratic	Karen McCormick	32,803	66.98
Republican	Mark Milliman	16,171	33.02
Total votes		48,974	100.0
Democratic hold			

=== District 12 ===
12th District Democratic Primary
Party	Candidate	Votes	%
Democratic	Tracey Bernett	21,873	100.0
Total votes		21,873	100.0

12th District Republican Primary
Party	Candidate	Votes	%
Republican	Eric J. Davila	4,909	100.0
Total votes		4,909	100.0

2020 Colorado House of Representatives election, 12th District
Party	Candidate	Votes	%
Democratic	Tracey Bernett	39,674	73.61
Republican	Eric J. Davila	14,227	26.39
Total votes		53,901	100.0
Democratic hold			

=== District 13 ===
13th District Democratic Primary
Party	Candidate	Votes	%
Democratic	Judy Amabile	18,131	100.0
Total votes		18,131	100.0

13th District Republican Primary
Party	Candidate	Votes	%
Republican	Kevin Sipple	4,736	100.0
Total votes		4,736	100.0

2020 Colorado House of Representatives election, 13th District
Party	Candidate	Votes	%
Democratic	Judy Amabile	34,652	68.24
Republican	Kevin Sipple	14,418	28.39
Libertarian	James Gilman	1,713	3.37
Total votes		50,783	100.0
Democratic hold			

=== District 14 ===
14th District Democratic Primary
Party	Candidate	Votes	%
Democratic	John Foley	8,855	100.0
Total votes		8,855	100.0

14th District Republican Primary
Party	Candidate	Votes	%
Republican	Shane Sandridge (incumbent)	14,366	100.0
Total votes		14,366	100.0

2020 Colorado House of Representatives election, 14th District Party
Party	Candidate	Votes	%
Republican	Shane Sandridge (incumbent)	34,013	60.86
Democratic	John Foley	19,688	35.23
Libertarian	David Thompson	2,189	3.92
Total votes		55,890	100.0
Republican hold			

=== District 15 ===
15th District Democratic Primary
Party	Candidate	Votes	%
Democratic	John Pyne IV	7,551	100.0
Total votes		7,551	100.0

15th District Republican Primary
Party	Candidate	Votes	%
Republican	Dave Williams (incumbent)	11,168	100.0
Total votes		11,168	100.0

2020 Colorado House of Representatives election, 15th District
Party	Candidate	Votes	%
Republican	Dave Williams (incumbent)	28,944	59.14
Democratic	John Pyne IV	17,535	35.83
Libertarian	Mike McRedmond	2,459	5.02
Total votes		48,938	100.0
Republican hold			

=== District 16 ===
16th District Democratic Primary
Party	Candidate	Votes	%
Democratic	Stephanie Vigil	8,189	100.0
Total votes		8,189	100.0

16th District Republican Primary
Party	Candidate	Votes	%
Republican	Andres G. Pico	10,521	100.0
Total votes		10,521	100.0

2020 Colorado House of Representatives election, 16th District
Party	Candidate	Votes	%
Republican	Andres G. Pico	23,842	54.53
Democratic	Stephanie Vigil	18,070	41.33
Libertarian	John Hjersman	1,813	4.15
Total votes		43,725	100.0
Republican hold			

=== District 17 ===
17th District Democratic Primary
Party	Candidate	Votes	%
Democratic	Tony Exum (incumbent)	5,940	100.0
Total votes		5,940	100.0

17th District Republican Primary
Party	Candidate	Votes	%
Republican	Rob Blancken	4,289	100.0
Total votes		4,289	100.0

2020 Colorado House of Representatives election, 17th District
Party	Candidate	Votes	%
Democratic	Tony Exum (incumbent)	15,780	56.76
Republican	Rob Blancken	10,398	37.40
Libertarian	Susan Quilleash-Nelson	1,621	5.83
Total votes		27,799	100.0
Democratic hold			

=== District 18 ===
18th District Democratic Primary
Party	Candidate	Votes	%
Democratic	Marc Snyder (incumbent)	12,270	100.0
Total votes		12,270	100.0

18th District Republican Primary
Party	Candidate	Votes	%
Republican	George M. Rapko	6,946	100.0
Total votes		6,946	100.0

2020 Colorado House of Representatives election, 18th District
Party	Candidate	Votes	%
Democratic	Marc Snyder (incumbent)	26,325	59.07
Republican	George M. Rapko	16,331	36.65
Libertarian	Nathan Foutch	1,907	4.28
Total votes		44,563	100.0
Democratic hold			

=== District 19 ===
19th District Democratic Primary
Party	Candidate	Votes	%
Democratic	Joe Thompson	7,829	100.0
Total votes		7,829	100.0

19th District Republican Primary
Party	Candidate	Votes	%
Republican	Tim Geitner (incumbent)	19,797	100.0
Total votes		19,797	100.0

2020 Colorado House of Representatives election, 19th District
Party	Candidate	Votes	%
Republican	Tim Geitner (incumbent)	48,521	74.97
Democratic	Joe Thompson	16,198	25.03
Total votes		64,719	100.0
Republican hold			

=== District 20 ===
20th District Democratic Primary
Party	Candidate	Votes	%
Democratic	Meg Fossinger	6,371	63.64
Democratic	Susan Crutchfield	3,640	36.36
Total votes		10,011	100.0

20th District Republican Primary
Party	Candidate	Votes	%
Republican	Terri Carver (incumbent)	11,777	100.0
Total votes		11,777	100.0

2022 Colorado House of Representatives election, 20th District
Party	Candidate	Votes	%
Republican	Terri Carver (incumbent)	27,376	58.72
Democratic	Meg Fossinger	17,799	38.18
Libertarian	Judith Darcy	1,446	3.10
Total votes		46,621	100.0
Republican hold			

=== District 21 ===
21st District Democratic Primary
Party	Candidate	Votes	%
Democratic	Liz Rosenbaum	5,345	100.0
Total votes		5,345	100.0

21st District Republican Primary
Party	Candidate	Votes	%
Republican	Mary Bradfield	6,690	100.0
Total votes		6,690	100.0

2020 Colorado House of Representatives election, 21st District
Party	Candidate	Votes	%
Republican	Mary Bradfield	17,448	54.20
Democratic	Liz Rosenbaum	12,999	40.38
Libertarian	Michael Seebeck	1,743	5.41
Total votes		32,190	100.0
Republican hold			

=== District 22 ===
22nd District Democratic Primary
Party	Candidate	Votes	%
Democratic	Mary Parker	12,464	100.0
Total votes		12,464	100.0

22nd District Republican Primary
Party	Candidate	Votes	%
Republican	Colin Larson (incumbent)	6,760	56.21
Republican	Justin Everett	5,266	43.79
Total votes		12,026	100.0

2020 Colorado House of Representatives election, 22nd District
Party	Candidate	Votes	%
Republican	Colin Larson (incumbent)	26,421	51.27
Democratic	Mary Parker	23,467	45.54
Libertarian	Margot Herzl	1,641	3.18
Total votes		51,529	100.0
Republican hold			

=== District 23 ===
23rd District Democratic Primary
Party	Candidate	Votes	%
Democratic	Chris Kennedy (incumbent)	15,352	100.0
Total votes		15,352	100.0

23rd District Republican Primary
Party	Candidate	Votes	%
Republican	Fred Clifford	6,290	100.0
Total votes		6,290	100.0

2020 Colorado House of Representatives election, 23rd District
Party	Candidate	Votes	%
Democratic	Chris Kennedy (incumbent)	29,615	60.22
Republican	Fred Clifford	17,126	34.82
Libertarian	Doug Anderson	2,437	4.96
Total votes		49,178	100.0
Democratic hold			

=== District 24 ===
24th District Democratic Primary
Party	Candidate	Votes	%
Democratic	Monica Duran (incumbent)	16,216	100.0
Total votes		16,216	100.0

24th District Republican Primary
Party	Candidate	Votes	%
Republican	Laurel Imer	6,197	100.0
Total votes		6,197	100.0

2020 Colorado House of Representatives election, 24th District
Party	Candidate	Votes	%
Democratic	Monica Duran (incumbent)	30,671	64.03
Republican	Laurel Imer	17,228	35.97
Total votes		47,899	100.0
Democratic hold			

=== District 25 ===
25th District Democratic Primary
Party	Candidate	Votes	%
Democratic	Lisa Cutter (incumbent)	15,712	100.0
Total votes		15,712	100.0

25th District Republican Primary
Party	Candidate	Votes	%
Republican	Donald Rosier	9,460	100.0
Total votes		9,460	100.0

2020 Colorado House of Representatives election, 25th District
Party	Candidate	Votes	%
Democratic	Lisa Cutter (incumbent)	30,249	52.82
Republican	Donald Rosier	27,023	47.18
Total votes		57,272	100.0
Democratic hold			

=== District 26 ===
26th District Democratic Primary
Party	Candidate	Votes	%
Democratic	Dylan Roberts (incumbent)	11,859	100.0
Total votes		11,859	100.0

2020 Colorado House of Representatives election, 26th District
Party	Candidate	Votes	%
Democratic	Dylan Roberts (incumbent)	32,059	100.0
Total votes		32,059	100.0
Democratic hold			

=== District 27 ===
27th District Democratic Primary
Party	Candidate	Votes	%
Democratic	Brianna Titone (incumbent)	17,469	100.0
Total votes		17,469	100.0

27th District Republican Primary
Party	Candidate	Votes	%
Republican	Vicki Pyne	10,199	100.0
Total votes		10,199	100.0

2020 Colorado House of Representatives election, 27th District
Party	Candidate	Votes	%
Democratic	Brianna Titone (incumbent)	29,566	48.70
Republican	Vicki Pyne	27,674	45.59
Libertarian	Cory Schaeffer	3,468	5.71
Total votes		60,708	100.0
Democratic hold			

=== District 28 ===
28th District Democratic Primary
Party	Candidate	Votes	%
Democratic	Kerry Tipper (incumbent)	13,844	100.0
Total votes		13,844	100.0

28th District Republican Primary
Party	Candidate	Votes	%
Republican	Pedro Roybal	6,025	100.0
Total votes		6,025	100.0

2020 Colorado House of Representatives election, 28th District
Party	Candidate	Votes	%
Democratic	Kerry Tipper (incumbent)	26,592	57.63
Republican	Pedro Roybal	17,030	36.91
Libertarian	Amara Hildebrand	2,519	5.46
Total votes		46,141	100.0
Democratic hold			

=== District 29 ===
29th District Democratic Primary
Party	Candidate	Votes	%
Democratic	Lindsey N. Daugherty	13,527	100.0
Total votes		13,527	100.0

29th District Republican Primary
Party	Candidate	Votes	%
Republican	Vanessa DeMott	6,294	100.0
Total votes		6,294	100.0

2020 Colorado House of Representatives election, 29th District
Party	Candidate	Votes	%
Democratic	Lindsey N. Daugherty	26,226	56.10
Republican	Vanessa DeMott	17,931	38.36
Libertarian	Ryan Van Gundy	2,590	5.54
Total votes		46,747	100.0
Democratic hold			

=== District 30 ===
30th District Democratic Primary
Party	Candidate	Votes	%
Democratic	Dafna Michaelson Jenet (incumbent)	8,892	100.0
Total votes		8,892	100.0

30th District Republican Primary
Party	Candidate	Votes	%
Republican	Kerrie Gutierrez	2,643	53.24
Republican	Cynthia M. Sarmiento	2,321	46.76
Total votes		4,964	100.0

2020 Colorado House of Representatives election, 30th District
Party	Candidate	Votes	%
Democratic	Dafna Michaelson Jenet (incumbent)	22,445	56.85
Republican	Kerrie Gutierrez	17,036	43.15
Total votes		39,481	100.0
Democratic hold			

=== District 31 ===
31st District Democratic Primary
Party	Candidate	Votes	%
Democratic	Yadira Caraveo (incumbent)	9,677	100.0
Total votes		9,677	100.0

2022 Colorado House of Representatives election, 31st District
Party	Candidate	Votes	%
Democratic	Yadira Caraveo (incumbent)	27,687	100.0
Total votes		27,687	100.0
Democratic hold			

=== District 32 ===
32nd District Democratic Primary
Party	Candidate	Votes	%
Democratic	Adrienne Benavidez (incumbent)	7,782	100.0
Total votes		7,782	100.0

32nd District Republican Primary
Party	Candidate	Votes	%
Republican	Tony Caputo	2,573	100.0
Total votes		2,573	100.0

2020 Colorado House of Representatives election, 32nd District
Party	Candidate	Votes	%
Democratic	Adrienne Benavidez (incumbent)	19,597	63.68
Republican	Tony Caputo	9,368	30.44
Libertarian	Jason Chapman	1,810	5.88
Total votes		30,775	100.0
Democratic hold			

=== District 33 ===
33rd District Democratic Primary
Party	Candidate	Votes	%
Democratic	Matt Gray (incumbent)	20,373	100.0
Total votes		20,373	100.0

33rd District Republican Primary
Party	Candidate	Votes	%
Republican	Mindy Quiachon	8,155	100.0
Total votes		8,155	100.0

2020 Colorado House of Representatives election, 33rd District
Party	Candidate	Votes	%
Democratic	Matt Gray (incumbent)	37,901	62.06
Republican	Mindy Quiachon	23,170	37.94
Total votes		61,071	100.0
Democratic hold			

=== District 34 ===
34th District Democratic Primary
Party	Candidate	Votes	%
Democratic	Kyle Mullica (incumbent)	8,667	100.0
Total votes		8,667	100.0

34th District Republican Primary
Party	Candidate	Votes	%
Republican	Mark Bromley	2,805	57.64
Republican	Audrey Herman	2,061	42.36
Total votes		4,866	100.0

2020 Colorado House of Representatives election, 34th District
Party	Candidate	Votes	%
Democratic	Kyle Mullica (incumbent)	19,845	56.22
Republican	Mark Bromley	13,694	38.79
Libertarian	Robert Stutz	1,760	4.99
Total votes		35,299	100.0
Democratic hold			

=== District 35 ===
35th District Democratic Primary
Party	Candidate	Votes	%
Democratic	Shannon Bird (incumbent)	12,011	100.0
Total votes		12,011	100.0

35th District Republican Primary
Party	Candidate	Votes	%
Republican	Roger Lehman	5,260	100.0
Total votes		5,260	100.0

2020 Colorado House of Representatives election, 35th District
Party	Candidate	Votes	%
Democratic	Shannon Bird (incumbent)	27,019	62.45
Republican	Roger Lehman	16,248	37.55
Total votes		43,267	100.0
Democratic hold			

=== District 36 ===
36th District Democratic Primary
Party	Candidate	Votes	%
Democratic	Mike Weissman (incumbent)	11,956	100.0
Total votes		11,956	100.0

36th District Republican Primary
Party	Candidate	Votes	%
Republican	Dustin Bishop	5,148	100.0
Total votes		5,148	100.0

2020 Colorado House of Representatives election, 36th District
Party	Candidate	Votes	%
Democratic	Mike Weissman (incumbent)	26,687	61.18
Republican	Dustin Bishop	16,935	38.82
Total votes		43,622	100.0
Democratic hold			

=== District 37 ===
37th District Democratic Primary
Party	Candidate	Votes	%
Democratic	Tom Sullivan (incumbent)	14,160	100.0
Total votes		14,160	100.0

37th District Republican Primary
Party	Candidate	Votes	%
Republican	Caroline Cornell	7,608	100.0
Total votes		7,608	100.0

2020 Colorado House of Representatives election, 37th District
Party	Candidate	Votes	%
Democratic	Tom Sullivan (incumbent)	27,829	55.58
Republican	Caroline Cornell	22,242	44.42
Total votes		50,071	100.0
Democratic hold			

=== District 38 ===
38th District Democratic Primary
Party	Candidate	Votes	%
Democratic	David Ortiz	12,153	65.34
Democratic	Candice Ferguson	6,448	34.66
Total votes		18,601	100.0

38th District Republican Primary
Party	Candidate	Votes	%
Republican	Richard Champion (incumbent)	10,064	100.0
Total votes		10,064	100.0

2020 Colorado House of Representatives election, 38th District
Party	Candidate	Votes	%
Democratic	David Ortiz	31,504	55.57
Republican	Richard Champion (incumbent)	25,191	44.43
Total votes		56,695	100.0
Democratic gain from Republican			

=== District 39 ===
39th District Democratic Primary
Party	Candidate	Votes	%
Democratic	Ian Chapman	9,875	100.0
Total votes		9,875	100.0

39th District Republican Primary
Party	Candidate	Votes	%
Republican	Mark Baisley (incumbent)	15,038	100.0
Total votes		15,038	100.0

2020 Colorado House of Representatives election, 39th District
Party	Candidate	Votes	%
Republican	Mark Baisley (incumbent)	37,657	63.04
Democratic	Ian Chapman	20,257	33.91
Libertarian	Bonnie Pyle	1,823	3.05
Total votes		59,737	100.0
Republican hold			

=== District 40 ===
40th District Democratic Primary
Party	Candidate	Votes	%
Democratic	Naquetta Ricks	7,203	51.46
Democratic	John Ronquillo	6,793	48.54
Total votes		13,996	100.0

40th District Republican Primary
Party	Candidate	Votes	%
Republican	Richard A. Bassett	5,928	100.0
Total votes		5,928	100.0

2020 Colorado House of Representatives election, 40th District
Party	Candidate	Votes	%
Democratic	Naquetta Ricks	25,508	59.16
Republican	Richard A. Bassett	15,807	36.66
Libertarian	Robert Harrison	1,805	4.19
Total votes		43,120	100.0
Democratic hold			

=== District 41 ===
41st District Democratic Primary
Party	Candidate	Votes	%
Democratic	Iman Jodeh	13,233	100.0
Total votes		13,233	100.0

41st District Republican Primary
Party	Candidate	Votes	%
Republican	Robert Andrews	5,074	100.0
Total votes		5,074	100.0

2020 Colorado House of Representatives election, 41st District
Party	Candidate	Votes	%
Democratic	Iman Jodeh	26,167	65.97
Republican	Robert Andrews	13,501	34.03
Total votes		39,668	100.0
Democratic hold			

=== District 42 ===
42nd District Democratic Primary
Party	Candidate	Votes	%
Democratic	Dominique Jackson (incumbent)	8,932	100.0
Total votes		8,932	100.0

2020 Colorado House of Representatives election, 42nd District
Party	Candidate	Votes	%
Democratic	Dominique Jackson (incumbent)	22,211	100.0
Total votes		22,211	100.0
Democratic hold			

=== District 43 ===
43rd District Democratic Primary
Party	Candidate	Votes	%
Democratic	Jennifer Mitkowski	11,855	100.0
Total votes		11,855	100.0

43rd District Republican Primary
Party	Candidate	Votes	%
Republican	Kevin Van Winkle (incumbent)	9,366	100.0
Total votes		9,366	100.0

2020 Colorado House of Representatives election, 43rd District
Party	Candidate	Votes	%
Republican	Kevin Van Winkle (incumbent)	26,758	52.86
Democratic	Jennifer Mitkowski	23,859	47.14
Total votes		50,617	100.0
Republican hold			

=== District 44 ===
44th District Democratic Primary
Party	Candidate	Votes	%
Democratic	Kyra D. Storojev	10,805	100.0
Total votes		10,805	100.0

44th District Republican Primary
Party	Candidate	Votes	%
Republican	Kim Ransom (incumbent)	10,408	100.0
Total votes		10,408	100.0

2020 Colorado House of Representatives election, 44th District
Party	Candidate	Votes	%
Republican	Kim Ransom (incumbent)	32,963	55.35
Democratic	Kyra D. Storojev	24,795	41.64
Libertarian	Brian Meyer	1,795	3.01
Total votes		59,553	100.0
Republican hold			

=== District 45 ===
45th District Democratic Primary
Party	Candidate	Votes	%
Democratic	Katie Barrett	11,471	100.0
Total votes		11,471	100.0

45th District Republican Primary
Party	Candidate	Votes	%
Republican	Patrick Neville (incumbent)	14,800	100.0
Total votes		14,800	100.0

2020 Colorado House of Representatives election, 45th District
Party	Candidate	Votes	%
Republican	Patrick Neville (incumbent)	40,418	60.19
Democratic	Katie Barrett	24,779	36.90
Libertarian	Caryn Ann Harlos	1,958	2.92
Total votes		67,155	100.0
Republican hold			

=== District 46 ===
46th District Democratic Primary
Party	Candidate	Votes	%
Democratic	Daneya Esgar (incumbent)	12,340	100.0
Total votes		12,340	100.0

46th District Republican Primary
Party	Candidate	Votes	%
Republican	Jonathan Ambler	5,815	74.91
Republican	Alexander Lucero-Mugatu	1,948	25.09
Total votes		7,763	100.0

2020 Colorado House of Representatives election, 46th District
Party	Candidate	Votes	%
Democratic	Daneya Esgar (incumbent)	24,118	53.21
Republican	Jonathan Ambler	19,532	43.10
Libertarian	John Pickerill	1,673	3.69
Total votes		45,323	100.0
Democratic hold			

=== District 47 ===
47th District Democratic Primary
Party	Candidate	Votes	%
Democratic	Bri Buentello (incumbent)	9,272	100.0
Total votes		9,272	100.0

47th District Republican Primary
Party	Candidate	Votes	%
Republican	Stephanie Luck	5,036	51.90
Republican	Ron Parker	4,668	48.10
Total votes		9,704	100.0

2020 Colorado House of Representatives election, 47th District
Party	Candidate	Votes	%
Republican	Stephanie Luck	23,310	54.09
Democratic	Bri Buentello (incumbent)	19,785	45.91
Total votes		43,095	100.0
Republican gain from Democratic			

=== District 48 ===
48th District Democratic Primary
Party	Candidate	Votes	%
Democratic	Holly A. Herson	7,829	100.0
Total votes		7,829	100.0

48th District Republican Primary
Party	Candidate	Votes	%
Republican	Tonya Van Beber	8,939	55.99
Republican	Grady Nouis	7,026	44.01
Total votes		15,965	100.0

2020 Colorado House of Representatives election, 48th District
Party	Candidate	Votes	%
Republican	Tonya Van Beber	37,670	66.71
Democratic	Holly A. Herson	18,802	33.29
Total votes		56,472	100.0
Republican hold			

=== District 49 ===
49th District Democratic Primary
Party	Candidate	Votes	%
Democratic	Yara Hanlin Zokaie	13,606	100.0
Total votes		13,606	100.0

49th District Republican Primary
Party	Candidate	Votes	%
Republican	Mike Lynch	12,606	67.02
Republican	Vicki Marble	6,202	32.98
Total votes		18,808	100.0

2020 Colorado House of Representatives election, 49th District
Party	Candidate	Votes	%
Republican	Mike Lynch	44,957	61.05
Democratic	Yara Hanlin Zokaie	28,678	38.95
Total votes		73,635	100.0
Republican hold			

=== District 50 ===
50th District Democratic Primary
Party	Candidate	Votes	%
Democratic	Mary Young (incumbent)	5,398	100.0
Total votes		5,398	100.0

2020 Colorado House of Representatives election, 50th District
Party	Candidate	Votes	%
Democratic	Mary Young (incumbent)	16,402	62.14
Libertarian	Sean Short	9,992	37.86
Total votes		26,394	100.0
Democratic hold			

=== District 51 ===
51st District Republican Primary
Party	Candidate	Votes	%
Republican	Hugh McKean (incumbent)	12,050	100.0
Total votes		12,050	100.0

2020 Colorado House of Representatives election, 51st District
Party	Candidate	Votes	%
Republican	Hugh McKean (incumbent)	37,654	100.0
Total votes		37,654	100.0
Republican hold			

=== District 52 ===
52nd District Democratic Primary
Party	Candidate	Votes	%
Democratic	Cathy Kipp (incumbent)	17,276	100.0
Total votes		17,276	100.0

52nd District Republican Primary
Party	Candidate	Votes	%
Republican	Donna Walter	7,083	100.0
Total votes		7,083	100.0

2020 Colorado House of Representatives election, 52nd District
Party	Candidate	Votes	%
Democratic	Cathy Kipp (incumbent)	36,140	63.77
Republican	Donna Walter	20,528	36.23
Total votes		56,668	100.0
Democratic hold			

=== District 53 ===
53rd District Democratic Primary
Party	Candidate	Votes	%
Democratic	Jennifer Arndt (incumbent)	13,943	100.0
Total votes		13,943	100.0

2020 Colorado House of Representatives election, 53rd District
Party	Candidate	Votes	%
Democratic	Jennifer Arndt (incumbent)	32,184	75.32
Libertarian	Adam Shuknecht	10,543	24.68
Total votes		42,727	100.0
Democratic hold			

=== District 54 ===
54th District Democratic Primary
Party	Candidate	Votes	%
Democratic	AliceMarie Slaven-Emond	5,686	100.0
Total votes		5,686	100.0

54th District Republican Primary
Party	Candidate	Votes	%
Republican	Matt Soper (incumbent)	14,270	100.0
Total votes		14,270	100.0

2020 Colorado House of Representatives election, 54th District
Party	Candidate	Votes	%
Republican	Matt Soper (incumbent)	34,112	74.44
Democratic	AliceMarie Slaven-Emond	11,715	25.56
Total votes		45,827	100.0
Republican hold			

=== District 55 ===
55th District Democratic Primary
Party	Candidate	Votes	%
Democratic	Scott Beilfuss	7,990	100.0
Total votes		7,990	100.0

55th District Republican Primary
Party	Candidate	Votes	%
Republican	Janice Rich (incumbent)	13,050	100.0
Total votes		13,050	100.0

2020 Colorado House of Representatives election, 55th District
Party	Candidate	Votes	%
Republican	Janice Rich (incumbent)	30,773	64.07
Democratic	Scott Beilfuss	15,570	32.42
Green	Sierra Garcia	1,688	3.51
Total votes		48,031	100.0
Republican hold			

=== District 56 ===
56th District Democratic Primary
Party	Candidate	Votes	%
Democratic	Giugi Carminati	12,005	100.0
Total votes		12,005	100.0

56th District Republican Primary
Party	Candidate	Votes	%
Republican	Rod Bockenfeld (incumbent)	12,336	100.0
Total votes		12,336	100.0

2020 Colorado House of Representatives election, 56th District
Party	Candidate	Votes	%
Republican	Rod Bockenfeld (incumbent)	35,520	57.44
Democratic	Giugi Carminati	23,790	38.47
Libertarian	Kevin Gulbranson	2,531	4.09
Total votes		61,841	100.0
Republican hold			

=== District 57 ===
57th District Democratic Primary
Party	Candidate	Votes	%
Democratic	Colin Wilhelm	6,201	100.0
Total votes		6,201	100.0

57th District Republican Primary
Party	Candidate	Votes	%
Republican	Perry Will (incumbent)	10,544	100.0
Total votes		10,544	100.0

2020 Colorado House of Representatives election, 57th District
Party	Candidate	Votes	%
Republican	Perry Will (incumbent)	25,433	63.38
Democratic	Colin Wilhelm	14,692	36.62
Total votes		40,125	100.0
Republican hold			

=== District 58 ===
58th District Democratic Primary
Party	Candidate	Votes	%
Democratic	Seth Cagin	7,387	100.0
Total votes		7,387	100.0

58th District Republican Primary
Party	Candidate	Votes	%
Republican	Marc Catlin (incumbent)	13,051	100.0
Total votes		13,051	100.0

2020 Colorado House of Representatives election, 58th District
Party	Candidate	Votes	%
Republican	Marc Catlin (incumbent)	29,424	64.92
Democratic	Seth Cagin	15,897	35.08
Total votes		45,321	100.0
Republican hold			

=== District 59 ===
59th District Democratic Primary
Party	Candidate	Votes	%
Democratic	Barbara McLachlan (incumbent)	13,516	100.0
Total votes		13,516	100.0

59th District Republican Primary
Party	Candidate	Votes	%
Republican	Marilyn Harris	8,956	100.0
Total votes		8,956	100.0

2020 Colorado House of Representatives election, 59th District
Party	Candidate	Votes	%
Democratic	Barbara McLachlan (incumbent)	29,524	55.38
Republican	Marilyn Harris	23,788	44.62
Total votes		53,312	100.0
Democratic hold			

=== District 60 ===
60th District Democratic Primary
Party	Candidate	Votes	%
Democratic	Lori Boydston	9,119	100.0
Total votes		9,119	100.0

60th District Republican Primary
Party	Candidate	Votes	%
Republican	Ron Hanks	13,559	100.0
Total votes		13,559	100.0

2020 Colorado House of Representatives election, 60th District
Party	Candidate	Votes	%
Republican	Ron Hanks	30,817	62.41
Democratic	Lori Boydston	18,563	37.59
Total votes		49,380	100.0
Republican hold			

=== District 61 ===
61st District Democratic Primary
Party	Candidate	Votes	%
Democratic	Julie McCluskie (incumbent)	13,196	100.0
Total votes		13,196	100.0

61st District Republican Primary
Party	Candidate	Votes	%
Republican	Kim McGahey	7,235	100.0
Total votes		7,235	100.0

2020 Colorado House of Representatives election, 61st District
Party	Candidate	Votes	%
Democratic	Julie McCluskie (incumbent)	31,228	60.43
Republican	Kim McGahey	20,448	39.57
Total votes		51,676	100.0
Democratic hold			

=== District 62 ===
62nd District Democratic Primary
Party	Candidate	Votes	%
Democratic	Donald Valdez (incumbent)	7,525	59.01
Democratic	Matthew Martinez	5,227	40.99
Total votes		12,752	100.0

62nd District Republican Primary
Party	Candidate	Votes	%
Republican	Logan Taggart	5,500	68.28
Republican	Steven Rodriguez	2,555	31.72
Total votes		8,055	100.0

2020 Colorado House of Representatives election, 62nd District
Party	Candidate	Votes	%
Democratic	Donald Valdez (incumbent)	22,945	57.81
Republican	Logan Taggart	16,742	42.19
Total votes		39,687	100.0
Democratic hold			

=== District 63 ===
63rd District Democratic Primary
Party	Candidate	Votes	%
Democratic	Gen Schneider	9,257	100.0
Total votes		9,257	100.0

63rd District Republican Primary
Party	Candidate	Votes	%
Republican	Dan Woog	8,620	62.39
Republican	Patricia Miller	5,196	37.61
Total votes		13,816	100.0

2020 Colorado House of Representatives election, 63rd District
Party	Candidate	Votes	%
Republican	Dan Woog	35,064	59.75
Democratic	Gen Schneider	20,906	35.63
Libertarian	Joe Johnson	2,711	4.62
Total votes		58,681	100.0
Republican hold			

=== District 64 ===
64th District Democratic Primary
Party	Candidate	Votes	%
Democratic	Dean Ormiston	5,603	100.0
Total votes		5,603	100.0

64th District Republican Primary
Party	Candidate	Votes	%
Republican	Richard Holtorf (incumbent)	13,419	100.0
Total votes		13,419	100.0

2020 Colorado House of Representatives election, 64th District
Party	Candidate	Votes	%
Republican	Richard Holtorf (incumbent)	31,908	72.88
Democratic	Dean Ormiston	11,876	27.12
Total votes		43,784	100.0
Republican hold			

=== District 65 ===
65th District Republican Primary
Party	Candidate	Votes	%
Republican	Rod Pelton (incumbent)	13,187	100.0
Total votes		13,187	100.0

2020 Colorado House of Representatives election, 65th District
Party	Candidate	Votes	%
Republican	Rod Pelton (incumbent)	31,857	100.0
Total votes		31,857	100.0
Republican hold			
