= Yeulin Willett =

American attorney and politician

Member of the Colorado House of Representatives from the 54th district
- In office January 7, 2015 – January 4, 2019
- Preceded by: Jared Wright
- Succeeded by: Matt Soper

Personal details
- Born: July 30, 1958 (age 68) Delta, Colorado
- Party: Republican
- Education: University of Colorado at Boulder
- Profession: Attorney
- Website: www.electwillett.com

Yeulin V. Willett (born July 30, 1958) is an attorney and politician from Delta, Colorado. A Republican, he represented District 54 in the Colorado House of Representatives.

== Education ==
Willett earned an undergraduate degree in Business/Economics (1980) and a Juris Doctor degree (1984), both from the University of Colorado at Boulder.

== Elections ==
Willett was first elected to the state house in 2014. In the general election that year, he won the race with 63.4% of the total vote, beating three other candidates. In the 2016 general election, he beat his Libertarian opponent Gilbert Fuller — his only opposition — with 77.08% of the vote. In early 2018 Willett announced that he would not be seeking re-election in the 2018 elections.
