= Colorado's 43rd House of Representatives district =

American legislative district

Colorado's 43rd State House of Representatives district
Representative
Bob Marshall; D–Highlands Ranch
- Demographics: 78% White; 1% Black; 10% Hispanic; 6% Asian; 0% Native American; 4% Multiracial
- Population (2024): 87,875

Colorado's 43rd House of Representatives district is one of 65 districts in the Colorado House of Representatives. It has been represented by Bob Marshall since 2023.
