= Colorado's 40th House of Representatives district =

American legislative district

Colorado's 40th State House of Representatives district
Representative
Naquetta Ricks; D–Aurora
- Demographics: 52% White; 12% Black; 22% Hispanic; 6% Asian; 0% Native American; 7% Multiracial
- Population (2024): 88,145

Colorado's 40th House of Representatives district is one of 65 districts in the Colorado House of Representatives. It has been represented by Naquetta Ricks since 2021.
