= Colorado's 55th House of Representatives district =

American legislative district

Colorado's 55th State House of Representatives district
Representative
Rick Taggart; R–Grand Junction
- Demographics: 78% White; 1% Black; 16% Hispanic; 1% Asian; 0% Native American; 3% Multiracial
- Population (2024): 89,402

Colorado's 55th House of Representatives district is one of 65 districts in the Colorado House of Representatives. It has been represented by Rick Taggart since 2023.
