= Colorado's 64th House of Representatives district =

American legislative district

Colorado's 64th State House of Representatives district
Representative
Scott Slaugh; R–Johnstown
- Demographics: 71% White; 1% Black; 24% Hispanic; 1% Asian; 0% Native American; 2% Multiracial
- Population (2024): 97,201

Colorado's 64th House of Representatives district is one of 65 districts in the Colorado House of Representatives. It has been represented by Scott Slaugh since 2025.
