= Colorado's 24th House of Representatives district =

American legislative district

Colorado's 24th State House of Representatives district
Representative
Lisa Feret; D–Arvada
- Demographics: 77% White; 1% Black; 15% Hispanic; 2% Asian; 1% Native American; 4% Multiracial
- Population (2024): 88,036

Colorado's 24th House of Representatives district is one of 65 districts in the Colorado House of Representatives. It has been represented by Lisa Feret since 2025.
