= Colorado's 44th House of Representatives district =

American legislative district

Colorado's 44th State House of Representatives district
Representative
Anthony Hartsook; R–Parker
- Demographics: 73% White; 2% Black; 11% Hispanic; 8% Asian; 0% Native American; 5% Multiracial
- Population (2024): 95,016

Colorado's 44th House of Representatives district is one of 65 districts in the Colorado House of Representatives. It has been represented by Anthony Hartsook since 2023.
