= Colorado's 61st House of Representatives district =

American legislative district

Colorado's 61st State House of Representatives district
Representative
Eliza Hamrick; D–Centennial
- Demographics: 66% White; 7% Black; 12% Hispanic; 9% Asian; 0% Native American; 6% Multiracial
- Population (2024): 93,482

Colorado's 61st House of Representatives district is one of 65 districts in the Colorado House of Representatives. It has been represented by Eliza Hamrick since 2023.
