= Colorado's 34th House of Representatives district =

American legislative district

Colorado's 34th State House of Representatives district
Representative
| Jenny Willford; D–Northglenn |
- Demographics: 56% White; 3% Black; 30% Hispanic; 5% Asian; 0% Native American; 5% Multiracial
- Population (2024): 89,498

Colorado's 34th House of Representatives district is one of 65 districts in the Colorado House of Representatives. It has been represented by Jenny Willford since 2023.
