= Colorado's 41st House of Representatives district =

American legislative district

Colorado's 41st State House of Representatives district
Representative
Jamie Jackson; D–Aurora
- Demographics: 44% White; 18% Black; 27% Hispanic; 6% Asian; 1% Native American; 5% Multiracial
- Population (2024): 88,015

Colorado's 41st House of Representatives district is one of 65 districts in the Colorado House of Representatives. It has been represented by Jamie Jackson since 2025.
