= Colorado's 58th House of Representatives district =

American legislative district

Colorado's 58th State House of Representatives district
Representative
Larry Don Suckla; R–Cortez
- Demographics: 79% White; 0% Black; 15% Hispanic; 0% Asian; 0% Native American; 4% Multiracial
- Population (2024): 92,095

Colorado's 58th House of Representatives district is one of 65 districts in the Colorado House of Representatives. It has been represented by Larry Don Suckla since 2025.
