= Colorado's 48th House of Representatives district =

American legislative district

Colorado's 48th State House of Representatives district
Representative
Carlos Barron; R–Fort Lupton
- Demographics: 54% White; 2% Black; 39% Hispanic; 1% Asian; 0% Native American; 3% Multiracial
- Population (2024): 94,392

Colorado's 48th House of Representatives district is one of 65 districts in the Colorado House of Representatives. It has been represented by Carlos Barron since 2025.
