= Colorado's 35th House of Representatives district =

American legislative district

Colorado's 35th State House of Representatives district
Representative
Lorena Garcia; D
- Demographics: 37% White; 1% Black; 55% Hispanic; 3% Asian; 0% Native American; 3% Multiracial
- Population (2024): 86,642

Colorado's 35th House of Representatives district is one of 65 districts in the Colorado House of Representatives. It has been represented by Lorena Garcia since January 9, 2023.
