= Colorado's 36th House of Representatives district =

American legislative district

Colorado's 36th State House of Representatives district
Representative
Michael Carter; D
- Demographics: 32% White; 15% Black; 40% Hispanic; 6% Asian; 0% Native American; 5% Multiracial
- Population (2024): 96,540

Colorado's 36th House of Representatives district is one of 65 districts in the Colorado House of Representatives. It has been represented by Michael Carter since 2025.
