= Colorado's 45th House of Representatives district =

American legislative district

Colorado's 45th State House of Representatives district
Representative
Max Brooks; R–Castle Rock
- Demographics: 78% White; 1% Black; 11% Hispanic; 3% Asian; 0% Native American; 6% Multiracial
- Population (2024): 96,648

Colorado's 45th House of Representatives district is one of 65 districts in the Colorado House of Representatives. It has been represented by Max Brooks since 2025.
