= Colorado's 59th House of Representatives district =

American legislative district

Colorado's 59th State House of Representatives district
Representative
Katie Stewart; D–Durango
- Demographics: 74% White; 0% Black; 14% Hispanic; 1% Asian; 6% Native American; 5% Multiracial
- Population (2024): 92,047

Colorado's 59th House of Representatives district is one of 65 districts in the Colorado House of Representatives. It has been represented by Katie Stewart since 2025.
