= Colorado's 22nd House of Representatives district =

American legislative district

Colorado's 22nd State House of Representatives district
Representative
Ken DeGraaf; R–Colorado Springs
- Demographics: 71% White; 4% Black; 17% Hispanic; 2% Asian; 0% Native American; 5% Multiracial
- Population (2024): 89,026

Colorado's 22nd House of Representatives district is one of 65 districts in the Colorado House of Representatives. It has been represented by Ken DeGraaf since 2023.
