= 2026 Colorado House of Representatives election =

- November 3, 2026

All 65 seats in the Colorado House of Representatives 33 seats needed for a majority

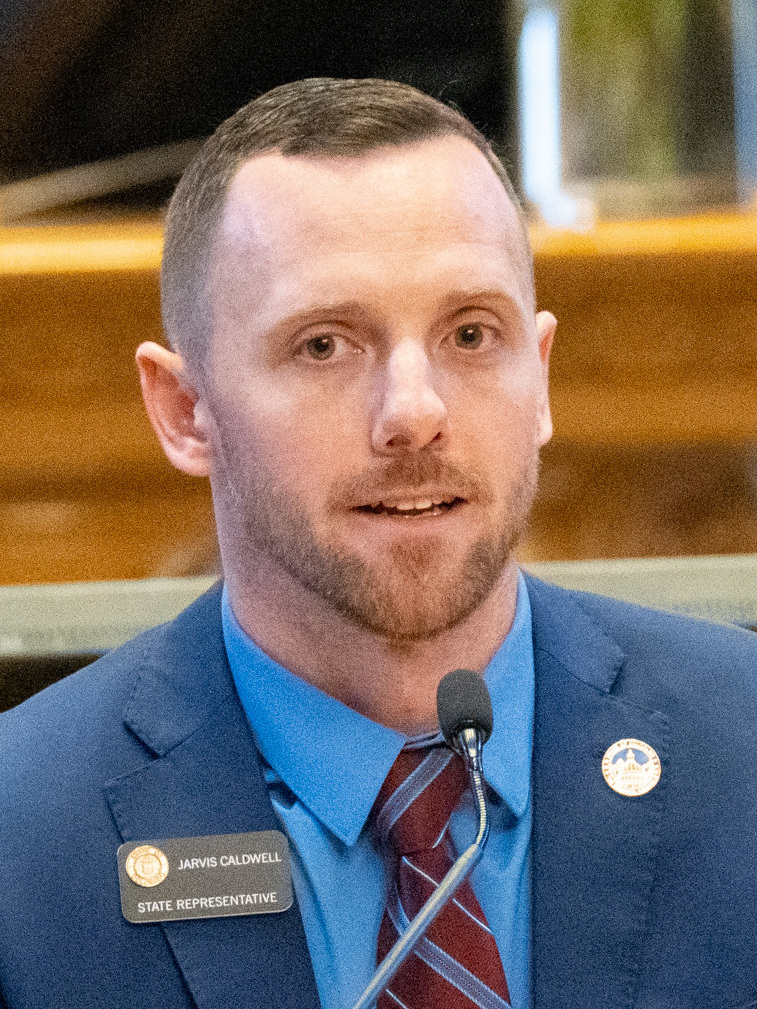
	Majority party	Minority party
Leader	Julie McCluskie (term-limited)	Jarvis Caldwell
Party	Democratic	Republican
Leader since	January 9, 2023	September 20, 2025
Leader's seat	13th–Dillon	20th–Monument
Last election	43 seats, 53.67%	22 seats, 45.09%
Seats before	43	22
Seats after	49	16
Seat change	▲6	▼6
Swing	▲0.34 pp
- Democratic incumbent Term-limited or retiring Democrat; Republican incumbent Term-limited or retiring Republican
Speaker before election
Julie McCluskie
Democratic
Elected Speaker
TBD

The 2026 Colorado House of Representatives elections were held on November 3, 2026, alongside the Colorado Senate election and the other 2026 United States elections. Voters elected members of the Colorado House of Representatives in all 65 of the U.S. state of Colorado's legislative districts to serve a two-year term.

== Retirements ==
=== Democratic ===
1. District 2: Steven Woodrow is retiring.
2. District 3: Meg Froelich is term-limited.
3. District 5: Alex Valdez is term-limited.
4. District 6: Sean Camacho lost his primary bid for re-election.
5. District 9: Emily Sirota is term-limited.
6. District 13: Julie McCluskie is term-limited.
7. District 23: Monica Duran is term-limited.
8. District 27: Brianna Titone is term-limited.
9. District 28: Sheila Lieder is retiring to run for the state senate.
10. District 29: Shannon Bird is term-limited.
11. District 31: Jacqueline Phillips lost her primary bid for re-election.
12. District 32: Manny Rutinel is retiring to run for the U.S. House of Representatives in Colorado's 8th congressional district.
13. District 42: Mandy Lindsay lost her primary bid for re-election.

=== Republican ===
1. District 15: Scott Bottoms is retiring to run for Governor.
2. District 16: Rebecca Keltie is retiring.
3. District 21: Mary Bradfield is retiring.
4. District 51: Ron Weinberg is retiring.
5. District 54: Matt Soper is term-limited.
6. District 60: Stephanie Luck is retiring.

== Primary election ==
Three incumbent Democrats lost renomination. Sean Camacho and Jacque Phillips lost to progressive challengers, while Mandy Lindsay lost amid ethics complaints. In other races, several progressives defeated more moderate candidates to advance to the general election.

== Predictions ==
Source	Ranking	As of
Sabato's Crystal Ball	Safe D	October 16, 2026
State Navigate	Solid D	August 27, 2026

== Incumbents and candidates ==
District	2024 Pres.	Incumbent				This race
District	2024 Pres.	Member	Party	First Elected	Status	Candidates
1st	D+29.4	Javier Mabrey	Democratic	2022	Incumbent re-elected.	▌ ✓ Javier Mabrey (Democratic); ▌Joseph Montoya (Republican)
2nd	D+57	Steven Woodrow	Democratic	2020 (appointed)	Incumbent retired. Democratic hold.	▌ ✓ Scott Baldermann (Democratic); ▌Carey Marin (Republican)
3rd	D+33.6	Meg Froelich	Democratic	2019 (appointed)	Incumbent term-limited. Democratic hold.	▌ ✓ Gena Ozols (Democratic); ▌Rebecca Winegar (Republican)
4th	D+58.1	Cecelia Espenoza	Democratic	2024	Incumbent re-elected.	▌ ✓ Cecelia Espenoza (Democratic); ▌Ellwood Ervin (Republican); ▌Bill Hare (Forward)
5th	D+58.6	Alex Valdez	Democratic	2018	Incumbent term-limited. Democratic hold.	▌ ✓ Justine Sandoval (Democratic); ▌Johnnie W. Johnson (Republican)
6th	D+69.5	Sean Camacho	Democratic	2024	Incumbent lost renomination. Democratic hold.	▌ ✓ Iris Halpern (Democratic); ▌Kathleen Angel (Republican)
7th	D+44.9	Jennifer Bacon	Democratic	2020	Incumbent re-elected.	▌ ✓ Jennifer Bacon (Democratic); ▌Jeff Wilson (Libertarian)
8th	D+74.2	Lindsay Gilchrist	Democratic	2024	Incumbent re-elected.	▌ ✓ Lindsay Gilchrist (Democratic); ▌Carolyn Barnes (Republican); ▌Jesse Lashawn Parris (Unity)
9th	D+49.2	Emily Sirota	Democratic	2018	Incumbent term-limited. Democratic hold.	▌ ✓ Monica VanBuskirk (Democratic); ▌Tom Cowhick (Republican)
10th	D+72.6	Junie Joseph	Democratic	2022	Incumbent re-elected.	▌ ✓ Junie Joseph (Democratic)
11th	D+40.5	Karen McCormick	Democratic	2020	Incumbent re-elected.	▌ ✓ Karen McCormick (Democratic)
12th	D+58.2	Kyle Brown	Democratic	2023 (appointed)	Incumbent re-elected.	▌ ✓ Kyle Brown (Democratic); ▌Ryan Rhatigan (Republican)
13th	D+11.2	Julie McCluskie	Democratic	2018	Incumbent term-limited. Democratic hold.	▌ ✓ Consuelo Redhorse (Democratic); ▌Miguel Martinez (Republican)
14th	R+10.5	Ava Flanell	Republican	2025 (appointed)	Incumbent re-elected.	▌ ✓ Ava Flanell (Republican); ▌Sarah Emery
15th	R+13.2	Scott Bottoms	Republican	2022	Incumbent retire to run for governor. Democratic gain.	▌Pricella Tiegen (Republican); ▌ ✓ Jeff K. Livingston (Democratic); ▌Doug Jones (Libertarian)
16th	D+6.9	Rebecca Keltie	Republican	2024	Incumbent retired. Democratic gain.	▌ ✓ Stephanie Vigil (Democratic); ▌Jill Haffley (Republican); ▌John Hjersman (Libertarian)
17th	D+11.1	Regina English	Democratic	2022	Incumbent re-elected	▌ ✓ Regina English (Democratic); ▌Laura Martin (Republican); ▌John Michael Angle (Libertarian)
18th	D+11.5	Amy Paschal	Democratic	2024	Incumbent re-elected.	▌ ✓ Amy Paschal (Democratic); ▌Adriana Cuva (Republican)
19th	D+8.7	Dan Woog	Republican	2024	Incumbent lost re-election. Democratic gain.	▌ ✓ Jillaire McMillan (Democratic); ▌Dan Woog (Republican)
20th	R+32.8	Jarvis Caldwell	Republican	2024	Incumbent re-elected.	▌ ✓ Jarvis Caldwell (Republican)
21st	R+15.1	Mary Bradfield	Republican	2020	Incumbent retiring. Democratic gain.	▌Brenda Miller (Republican); ▌ ✓ Michelle Tweed (Democratic)
22nd	R+10.4	Ken DeGraaf	Republican	2022	Incumbent Running	▌Ken DeGraaf (Republican); ▌Michael Pierson (Democratic)
23rd	D+30	Monica Duran	Democratic	2018	Incumbent term-limited. Democratic hold.	▌ ✓ Alexis Hoffkling (Democratic); ▌Ross Metler (Libertarian)
24th	D+18.2	Lisa Feret	Democratic	2024	Incumbent re-elected.	▌ ✓ Lisa Feret (Democratic); ▌Kristopher Johnson (Republican)
25th	D+10.7	Tammy Story	Democratic	2018	Incumbent re-elected.	▌ ✓ Tammy Story (Democratic); ▌Mark Herzfeld (Republican)
26th	D+6.0	Meghan Lukens	Democratic	2022	Incumbent re-elected.	▌ ✓ Meghan Lukens (Democratic); ▌James Kellogg (Republican)
27th	D+22.4	Brianna Titone	Democratic	2018	Incumbent term-limited. Democratic hold.	▌ ✓ Danielle Varda (Democratic); ▌Eric Bodenstab (Republican)
28th	D+10.7	Sheila Lieder	Democratic	2022	Incumbent retired to run for state senate. Democratic hold.	▌ ✓ David Rein (Democratic)
29th	D+22.3	Lori Goldstein	Democratic	2026 (appointed)	Incumbent re-elected.	▌ ✓ Lori Goldstein (Democratic); ▌Kristine Ireland (Republican)
30th	D+29.2	Rebekah Stewart	Democratic	2024	Incumbent re-elected.	▌ ✓ Rebekah Stewart (Democratic); ▌William Tyler Switzer (Republican)
31st	D+11.2	Jacqueline Phillips	Democratic	2024	Incumbent lost renomination. Democratic hold.	▌ ✓ Gabriel Cervantes (Democratic); ▌Ray Roll (Republican)
32nd	D+7.0	Manny Rutinel	Democratic	2023 (appointed)	Incumbent retired to run for U.S. House. Democratic hold.	▌ ✓ Chris VanDijk (Democratic); ▌Michelle D. Lee (Republican)
33rd	D+22.9	Kenny Nguyen	Democratic	2026 (appointed)	Incumbent re-elected.	▌ ✓ Kenny Nguyen (Democratic); ▌Nate Jorgensen (Republican)
34th	D+7.7	Jenny Willford	Democratic	2022	Incumbent re-elected.	▌ ✓ Jenny Willford (Democratic); ▌Craig Sullivan (Republican)
35th	D+25	Lorena Garcia	Democratic	2023 (appointed)	Incumbent re-elected	▌ ✓ Lorena Garcia (Democratic)
36th	D+24	Michael Carter	Democratic	2024	Incumbent re-elected.	▌ ✓ Michael Carter (Democratic); ▌Paul Nelson (Republican); ▌Andrew Gibson (Libertarian)
37th	D+19.3	Chad Clifford	Democratic	2024 (appointed)	Incumbent re-elected.	▌ ✓ Chad Clifford (Democratic); ▌Jill Thompson (Republican)
38th	D+16	Gretchen Rydin	Democratic	2024	Incumbent re-elected.	▌ ✓ Gretchen Rydin (Democratic); ▌Norm Olsen (Libertarian); ▌Allison Madrigal (Independent); ▌Tim Martin (Center)
39th	R+8.6	Brandi Bradley	Republican	2022	Incumbent re-elected.	▌ ✓ Brandi Bradley (Republican); ▌Christian Schilder (Democratic)
40th	D+18.9	Naquetta Ricks	Democratic	2020	Incumbent re-elected.	▌ ✓ Naquetta Ricks (Democratic); ▌Clinton Porter (Republican)
41st	D+29.1	Jamie Jackson	Democratic	2025 (appointed)	Incumbent re-election.	▌ ✓ Jamie Jackson (Democratic)
42nd	D+34.9	Mandy Lindsay	Democratic	2022 (appointed)	Incumbent lost renomination. Democratic hold.	▌ ✓ Sarah Woodson (Democratic)
43rd	D+7.0	Bob Marshall	Democratic	2022	Incumbent re-election.	▌ ✓ Bob Marshall (Democratic); ▌Nate Marsh (Republican)
44th	R+9.7	Anthony Hartsook	Republican	2022	Incumbent re-elected.	▌ ✓ Anthony Hartsook (Republican); ▌Richard Bowness (Democratic); ▌John Sutton (Libertarian)
45th	R+16.5	Max Brooks	Republican	2024	Incumbent re-elected.	▌ ✓ Max Brooks (Republican); ▌Michael Clarkson (Democratic); ▌Caryn Ann Harlos (Libertarian)
46th	R+0.9	Tisha Mauro	Democratic	2022	Incumbent re-elected.	▌ ✓ Tisha Mauro (Democratic); ▌Jonathan Post (Republican)
47th	R+30.4	Ty Winter	Republican	2022	Incumbent re-elected.	▌ ✓ Ty Winter (Republican); ▌Victor Meyers (Democratic)
48th	R+26.3	Carlos Barron	Republican	2024	Incumbent re-elected.	▌ ✓ Carlos Barron (Republican); ▌Dez Packard (Democratic); ▌Eric Joss (Libertarian)
49th	D+33	Lesley Smith	Democratic	2024	Incumbent re-elected.	▌ ✓ Lesley Smith (Democratic); ▌Michael Sheperek (Republican)
50th	R+3.3	Ryan Gonzalez	Republican	2024	Incumbent lost re-election. Democratic gain.	▌ ✓ Tommy Butler (Democratic); ▌Ryan Gonzalez (Republican)
51st	D+0.7	Ron Weinberg	Republican	2023 (Appointed)	Incumbent retiring. Democratic gain.	▌ ✓ Jacki Marsh (Democratic); ▌Amy Parks (Republican)
52nd	D+33.3	Yara Zokaie	Democratic	2024	Incumbent re-elected.	▌ ✓ Yara Zokaie (Democratic); ▌Steve Yurash (Center)
53rd	D+49.3	Andrew Boesenecker	Democratic	2021 (Appointed)	Incumbent re-elected.	▌ ✓ Andrew Boesenecker (Democratic); ▌Daniel Frick (Republican)
54th	R+39.1	Matt Soper	Republican	2018	Incumbent term-limited. Republican hold.	▌ ✓ Jason Bias (Republican); ▌Mallory Martin (Democratic)
55th	R+14.4	Rick Taggart	Republican	2022	Incumbent re-elected.	▌ ✓ Rick Taggart (Republican); ▌Brittni Packard (Democratic)
56th	R+49	Chris Richardson	Republican	2024	Incumbent re-elected.	▌ ✓ Chris Richardson (Republican); ▌Amy Lunde (Libertarian)
57th	D+16	Elizabeth Velasco	Democratic	2022	Incumbent re-elected.	▌ ✓ Elizabeth Velasco (Democratic); ▌Russ Andrews (Republican)
58th	R+9.2	Larry Don Suckla	Republican	2024	Incumbent re-elected.	▌ ✓ Larry Don Suckla (Republican)
59th	D+7.3	Katie Stewart	Democratic	2024	Incumbent re-elected.	▌ ✓ Katie Stewart (Democratic); ▌Naomi Riess (Republican)
60th	R+35.6	Stephanie Luck	Republican	2020	Incumbent retired. Republican hold.	▌ ✓ Matt Alexander (Republican); ▌Kathryn Green (Democratic)
61st	D+8.3	Eliza Hamrick	Democratic	2022	Incumbent re-elected.	▌ ✓ Eliza Hamrick (Democratic); ▌Scott Shamblin (Republican); ▌Kevin Gulbranson (Libertarian)
62nd	D+0.1	Matthew Martinez	Democratic	2022	Incumbent re-elected.	▌ ✓ Matthew Martinez (Democratic); ▌Steven Rodriguez (Republican); ▌Donald Luke Vermillion (Libertarian)
63rd	R+57.6	Dusty A. Johnson	Republican	2024	Incumbent re-elected.	▌ ✓ Dusty A. Johnson (Republican)
64th	R+20.5	Scott Slaugh	Republican	2025 (Appointed)	Incumbent re-elected.	▌ ✓ Scott Slaugh (Republican); ▌Maureen Dower (Democratic)
65th	R+17.1	Lori Garcia Sander	Republican	2024	Incumbent re-elected.	▌ ✓ Lori Garcia Sander (Republican)

== See also ==
- 2026 Colorado Senate election
- 2026 Colorado elections
