= 75th Colorado General Assembly =

←	74th Colorado General Assembly	76th Colorado General Assembly	→
- The Seal of Colorado

Overview
- Legislative body: Colorado General Assembly
- Jurisdiction: Colorado
- Term: January 8, 2025 – Present

Colorado Senate
- Members: 35
- President of the Senate: James Coleman (D); Jan. 8, 2025 – present
- President pro tempore: Cathy Kipp (D); Feb. 23, 2026 – present
- Majority Leader: Robert Rodriguez (D); Sep. 8, 2024 – present
- Minority Leader: Cleave Simpson (R); June 12, 2025 – present
- Party control: Democratic

Colorado House of Representatives
- Members: 65
- Speaker of the House: Julie McCluskie(D); Jan. 9, 2023 – present
- Speaker pro tempore: Andrew Boesenecker (D) Jan. 8, 2025 – present
- Majority Leader: Monica Duran (D) Jan. 9, 2023 – present
- Minority Leader: Rose Pugliese (R); Jan. 24, 2024 – present
- Party control: Democratic

Sessions
- 1st: January 8, 2025 – May 7, 2025
- 2nd: January 2026 – May 2026

Special sessions
- 1st: August 21, 2025 – August 26, 2025

The Seventy-fifth Colorado General Assembly is the current term of the legislative branch of the Colorado state government, consisting of the Colorado Senate and the Colorado House of Representatives. The first regular session of the Seventy-fifth Colorado General Assembly convened at the Colorado State Capitol on January 8, 2025, and is set to conclude on May 7, 2025. The second regular session is due to convene in the first week of January 2026.

The 75th General Assembly is made up of a record 52% women, 14 in the Senate, and 38 in the House. Colorado is one of only three legislatures in the United States that is majority women.

== Major Events ==
=== Vacancies and special elections ===
- November 12, 2024: One week after reelection, Senator Chris Hansen resigned to serve as CEO of the La Plata Electrical Association.
- November 21, 2024: Senator Janet Buckner announces her resignation, effective January 8.
- January 6, 2025: Colorado Representative Iman Jodeh is selected to represent the 29th Senate district by vacancy committee, replacing Buckner.
- January 7, 2025: Matthew Ball is selected by vacancy committee to represent the 31st Senate district, replacing Hansen.
- February 17, 2025: Senator Sonya Jaquez Lewis resigns amid an ethics investigation.
- March 18, 2025: Katie Wallace is selected by vacancy committee to replace Jaquez Lewis in representing the 17th Senate district.
- June 9, 2025, Senate Minority Leader Paul Lundeen announced his resignation from the Senate.
- June 30, 2025: Lynda Zamora Wilson is selected by vacancy committee to replace Lundeen in representing the 9th Senate district.
- August 21, 2025: Representative Ryan Armagost resigned from the House. Armagost had previously announced his resignation, due to occur on September 1st.

=== Leadership changes ===
- November 8, 2024:
  - Former Senate President Pro Tempore James Coleman is elected to serve as Senate President, replacing outgoing term-limited President Steve Fenberg. Coleman's election is not official until a formal vote may occur on the first day of the 75th General Assembly.
  - Senator Lisa Cutter is elected to serve as Senate majority leader, replacing Senator Faith Winter, who did not seek reelection for the position.
  - Senator Dafna Michaelson Jenet is elected to serve as Senate Pro Tempore.
  - Senator-Elect Judy Amabile is appointed to serve on the coveted Joint Budget Committee, replacing Rachel Zenzinger, who was term-limited.
  - Senators Nick Hinrichsen and Dylan Roberts are elected to serve as Senate majority caucus co-chairs, replacing Senator Janet Buckner, who did not seek reelection to the position.
  - Representative Anthony Hartsook is elected to serve as House minority caucus chair, replacing Representative Mary Bradfield, who did not seek reelection to the position.
- November 11, 2024:
  - Former Senate Minority whip Senator Cleave Simpson is elected to serve as Senate assistant minority leader, replacing term-limited Bob Gardner.
  - Senator Janice Rich is elected to serve as Senate minority whip.
  - Senator Byron Pelton is elected to serve as Senate minority caucus chair, replacing term-limited Jim Smallwood.
  - Representative Matthew Martinez is elected to serve as House majority co-whip along with then-Representative Iman Jodeh.
  - Representative Junie Joseph is elected to serve as House majority co-caucus chair, replacing Representative Brianna Titone, who did not seek reelection to the position.
- December 9, 2024: Representative Andrew Boesenecker is appointed by Speaker Julie McCluskie to serve as Speaker Pro Tempore, replacing Representative Chris Kennedy, who was term limited.
- January 10, 2025: Representative Elizabeth Velasco is elected to serve as House majority co-whip, replacing Iman Jodeh who resigned from her House seat after being appointed by vacancy committee to represent the 29th district in the Senate.
- June 9, 2025: Senate Minority Leader Paul Lundeen resigns from his position as Senate Minority Leader and as state Senator.
- June 12, 2025: Assistant Senate Minority Leader Cleave Simpson is elected to serve as Senate Minority Leader following Paul Lundeen's resignation on June 9. Senator Lisa Frizell is elected to replace Simpson as Assistant Senate Minority Leader.
- July 8, 2025: Representative Carlos Barron is elected House Minority Whip. Former whip, Ryan Armagost, announced his resignation from the role on July 1, and also announced he would resign from the House of Representatives on September 1.

== Legislation ==
Notable legislative topics during the 75th General Assembly include workers' rights, gun regulation, and affordability. As the first regular session of the 75th General Assembly is still ongoing, most bills are still awaiting action.

=== Signed into law ===
The following bills have been signed into law by Colorado Governor Jared Polis.

- SB 25-003 - Bans the sale of specific semi-automatic firearms unless buyers pass a firearm safety training course. Sponsored by Senators Tom Sullivan and Julie Gonzales, as well as Representatives Andrew Boesenecker and Meg Froelich.
- HB25-1040 - Statutorily adds nuclear energy to the list of clean energy sources. Meant to encourage the development of nuclear energy in Colorado. Sponsored by Senators Larry Liston and Dylan Roberts, as well as Representatives Ty Winter and Alex Valdez.
- HB25-1005 - Creates tax incentives for film festivals. Sponsors stated the objective of the bill was to lure the Sundance Film Festival to the state. Sponsored by Senators Mark Baisley and Judy Amabile, as well as Representatives Monica Duran and Brianna Titone.
- SB25-014 - Repeals the constitutional ban on same-sex marriage in Colorado. Sponsored by Senator Jessie Danielson, as well as Representatives Lorena Garcia and Brianna Titone.

=== Vetoed ===
The following bills were vetoed by Colorado Governor Jared Polis.

- SB 25-086 - If enacted, the bill would have obligated social media platforms to more actively monitor their sites and ban users who breached their terms of service or used the platforms to break state laws. It also would have mandated improved cooperation with law enforcement. The Senate overrode the Governor's veto, but the House postponed the bill to beyond the end of the legislative session, effectively sustaining the veto.
- SB 25-027 - If enacted, the bill would have lengthened the amount of time a records custodian has to respond to a CORA request, with the exception of requests submitted by journalists.

=== Lost ===
The following bills were not passed out of the legislature.

- SB25-201 - Would have required the implementation of age verification for pornographic websites. The bill was intentionally shelved on the sponsors' request in the Senate. Sponsored by Senators Paul Lundeen and Lindsey Daugherty, as well as Representatives Mandy Lindsay, and Meghan Lukens.

== Members of the Colorado Senate ==
District	Image	Senator	Party	Residence	Term limited?	Notes
1		Byron Pelton	Republican	Sterling	No	Minority Caucus Chair (November 11, 2025 - present) Eligible for reelection in 2026.
2		Lisa Frizell	Republican	Castle Rock	No	Eligible for reelection in 2028. Assistant Minority Leader (June 12, 2025 - Present)
3		Nick Hinrichsen	Democratic	Pueblo	No	Majority Caucus co-chair (November 8, 2024 - present) Eligible for reelection in 2026.
4		Mark Baisley	Republican	Sedalia	No	Eligible for reelection in 2026.
5		Marc Catlin	Republican	Montrose	No	Eligible for reelection in 2028.
6		Cleave Simpson	Republican	Alamosa	Yes	Assistant Minority Leader (November 11, 2025 - June 12, 2025) Minority Leader (June 12, 2025 - Present)
7		Janice Rich	Republican	Grand Junction	No	Minority Whip (November 11, 2025 - present) Eligible for reelection in 2026.
8		Dylan Roberts	Democratic	Eagle	No	Majority Caucus co-chair (November 8, 2024 - present) Eligible for reelection in 2026.
9		Paul Lundeen	Republican	Colorado Springs	Yes	Minority Leader (November 10, 2022 - June 9, 2025) Resigned from the Senate on June 9.
9		Lynda Zamora Wilson	Republican	El Paso County	No	Appointed by vacancy committee following the resignation of Lundeen.
10		Larry Liston	Republican	Colorado Springs	Yes	
11		Tony Exum	Democratic	Colorado Springs	No	Eligible for reelection in 2026.
12		Marc Snyder	Democratic	Manitou Springs	No	Eligible for reelection in 2028.
13		Scott Bright	Republican	Platteville	No	Eligible for reelection in 2028.
14		Cathy Kipp	Democratic	Fort Collins	No	Eligible for reelection in 2028.
15		Janice Marchman	Democratic	Loveland	No	Eligible for reelection in 2026.
16		Chris Kolker	Democratic	Centennial	Yes	
17		Sonya Jaquez Lewis	Democratic	Boulder	--	Resigned on February 17, 2025.
17		Katie Wallace	Democratic	Longmont	No	Selected by vacancy committee to serve until 2026 following Jaquez Lewis's resignation. Eligible for election in 2026.
18		Judy Amabile	Democratic	Boulder	No	Ranking Joint Budget Committee Member (November 8, 2024 - present) Eligible for reelection in 2028.
19		Lindsey Daugherty	Democratic	Arvada	No	Eligible for reelection in 2028.
20		Lisa Cutter	Democratic	Evergreen	No	Assistant Majority Leader (November 8, 2024 - present) Eligible for reelection in 2026.
21		Dafna Michaelson Jenet	Democratic	Commerce City	No	President Pro Tempore (November 8, 2024 - present) Eligible for reelection in 2028.
22		Jessie Danielson	Democratic	Wheat Ridge	Yes	
23		Barbara Kirkmeyer	Republican	Brighton	Yes	Ranking Joint Budget Committee Member (December 9, 2022 - present) 2028^{#}
24		Kyle Mullica	Democratic	Northglenn	No	Eligible for reelection in 2026.
25		Faith Winter	Democratic	Thornton	Yes	
26		Jeff Bridges	Democratic	Greenwood Village	Yes	
27		Tom Sullivan	Democratic	Centennial	No	Eligible for reelection in 2026.
28		Mike Weissman	Democratic	Aurora	No	Eligible for reelection in 2028.
29		Iman Jodeh	Democratic	Aurora	No	Eligible for reelection in 2028.
30		John Carson	Republican	Highlands Ranch	No	Eligible for reelection in 2026.
31		Matthew Ball	Democratic	Denver	No	Eligible for reelection in 2028.
32		Robert Rodriguez	Democratic	Denver	Yes	Majority Leader (September 8, 2024 - present)
33		James Coleman	Democratic	Denver	Yes	Senate President (November 8, 2024 - present)
34		Julie Gonzales	Democratic	Denver	Yes	
35		Rod Pelton	Republican	Cheyenne Wells	No	Eligible for reelection in 2026.

== Members of the House of Representatives ==
District	Representative	Party	Residence	First elected
1	Javier Mabrey	Democratic	Denver	2022
2	Steven Woodrow	Democratic	Denver	2020*
3	Meg Froelich	Democratic	Greenwood Village	2019*
4	Cecelia Espenoza	Democratic	Denver	2024
5	Alex Valdez	Democratic	Denver	2018
6	Sean Camacho	Democratic	Denver	2024
7	Jennifer Bacon	Democratic	Denver	2020
8	Lindsay Gilchrist	Democratic	Denver	2024
9	Emily Sirota	Democratic	Denver	2018
10	Junie Joseph	Democratic	Boulder	2022
11	Karen McCormick	Democratic	Hygiene	2020
12	Kyle Brown	Democratic	Louisville	2023*
13	Julie McCluskie	Democratic	Boulder	2018
14	Rose Pugliese	Republican	Colorado Springs	2022
15	Scott Bottoms	Republican	Colorado Springs	2022
16	Rebecca Keltie	Republican	Colorado Springs	2024
17	Regina English	Democratic	Colorado Springs	2022
18	Amy Paschal	Democratic	Colorado Springs	2024
19	Dan Woog	Republican	Frederick	2022
20	Jarvis Caldwell	Republican	El Paso County	2024
21	Mary Bradfield	Republican	Colorado Springs	2020
22	Ken DeGraaf	Republican	Colorado Springs	2022
23	Monica Duran	Democratic	Wheat Ridge	2018
24	Lisa Feret	Democratic	Arvada	2024
25	Tammy Story	Democratic	Evergreen	2018
26	Meghan Lukens	Democratic	Eagle	2022
27	Brianna Titone	Democratic	Golden	2018
28	Sheila Lieder	Democratic	Littleton	2022
29	Shannon Bird	Democratic	Northglenn	2018
30	Rebekah Stewart	Democratic	Lakewood	2024
31	Jacqueline Phillips	Democratic	Thornton	2024
32	Manny Rutinel	Democratic	Commerce City	2023*
33	William Lindstedt	Democratic	Broomfield	2022
34	Jenny Willford	Democratic	Northglenn	2022
35	Lorena Garcia	Democratic	Westminster	2023*
36	Michael Carter	Democratic	Aurora	2024
37	Chad Clifford	Democratic	Centennial	2024*
38	Gretchen Rydin	Democratic	Littleton	2024
39	Brandi Bradley	Republican	Larkspur	2022
40	Naquetta Ricks	Democratic	Aurora	2020
41	Jamie Jackson	Democratic	Aurora	2025*
42	Mandy Lindsay	Democratic	Aurora	2022*
43	Bob Marshall	Democratic	Highlands Ranch	2022
44	Anthony Hartsook	Republican	Parker	2022
45	Max Brooks	Republican	Castle Rock	2024
46	Tisha Mauro	Democratic	Pueblo	2022
47	Ty Winter	Republican	Trinidad	2022
48	Carlos Barron	Republican	Fort Lupton	2024
49	Lesley Smith	Democratic	Boulder	2024
50	Ryan Gonzalez	Republican	Greeley	2024
51	Ron Weinberg	Republican	Loveland	2023*
52	Yara Zokaie	Democratic	Windsor	2024
53	Andrew Boesenecker	Democratic	Fort Collins	2021*
54	Matt Soper	Republican	Delta	2018
55	Rick Taggart	Republican	Grand Junction	2022
56	Chris Richardson	Republican	Elbert County	2024
57	Elizabeth Velasco	Democratic	Glenwood Springs	2022
58	Larry Don Suckla	Republican	Montezuma County	2024
59	Katie Stewart	Democratic	Durango	2024
60	Stephanie Luck	Republican	Penrose	2020
61	Eliza Hamrick	Democratic	Centennial	2022
62	Matthew Martinez	Democratic	Alamosa	2022
63	Dusty A. Johnson	Republican	Fort Morgan	2024
64	Ryan Armagost	Republican	Berthoud	2022
64	Vacant (Note: Ryan Armagost resigned from the seat on August 21, 2025)	--	--	--
65	Lori Garcia Sander	Republican	Eaton	2024

*Representative was originally appointed

== See also ==
- 2026 Colorado House of Representatives election
- 2026 Colorado Senate election
