= 2024 Colorado Amendment J =

Referendum to repeal same-sex marriage ban

Amendment J
- November 5, 2024
- Shall there be an amendment to the Colorado constitution removing the ban on same-sex marriage?

Results
Choice	Votes	%
Yes	1,982,200	64.33%
No	1,099,228	35.67%
Total votes	3,081,428	100.00%
Registered voters/turnout	4,058,938	79.85%

Yes
90–100%
80–90%
70–80%
60–70%
50–60%
No
90–100%
80–90%
70–80%
60–70%
50–60%
Other
Tie
No votes

2024 Colorado Amendment J is an amendment to the Colorado Constitution that appeared on the general election ballot on November 5, 2024, in Colorado. As it passed, the amendment repealed Amendment 43, a 2006 constitutional amendment ban on same-sex marriage in the Constitution of Colorado. While constitutional ballot measures typically require a 55% vote to pass in Colorado, Amendment J only needed a simple majority because the 55% vote threshold applies only to proposed amendments that add to the Constitution, not those that repeal provisions from it. The amendment passed with 64% of the vote.

== Background ==
In 2006, Colorado voters passed Amendment 43 which defined marriage as a union between one man and one woman within the State of Colorado. Same-sex marriage was illegal in Colorado prior to this, with the ballot measure simply moving the state's ban on same-sex marriage from state statute to the state Constitution. Following a 2014 decision by the Colorado Supreme Court, Attorney General John Suthers declared that County Clerks within the state could not deny couples marriage licenses on the basis of sex. On June 26, 2015, the US Supreme Court ruled in the case Obergefell v. Hodges which struck down same-sex marriage bans nationwide. This made the text of Amendment 43 legally unenforceable. Following the 2022 decision in Dobbs v. Jackson Women's Health Organization however, some groups in favor of same-sex marriage pushed to repeal Amendment 43 out of concern that the Obergefell v. Hodges decision could be overturned by the US Supreme Court as well.

On April 19, 2024, Senator Joann Ginal and Representatives Alex Valdez and Brianna Titone introduced Senate Concurrent Resolution 24–003 to the Colorado General Assembly to refer the issue of the Constitutionality same-sex marriage to voters. The bill passed the Colorado Senate on a vote of 29 in favor to 5 opposed. All 23 Senate Democrats as well as 6 Republicans voted in favor, with all 5 no votes coming from Republicans. The bill then passed the Colorado House of Representatives with all Democrats voting in favor other than Regina English and all Republicans voting against other than Matt Soper and Rick Taggart. The bill was signed into law by Governor Jared Polis on May 8, 2024, resulting in the amendment appearing on the November 2024 ballot. The amendment was passed by voters, removing language from the Colorado Constitution stating that marriage is exclusively between a man and a woman.

April 29, 2024 vote in the Colorado Senate
Political affiliation	Voted for	Voted against	Abstained/Not present
Democratic Party	23: Jeff Bridges; Janet Buckner; James Coleman; Lisa Cutter; Jessie Danielson; Tony Exum; Steve Fenberg; Rhonda Fields; Joann Ginal; Julie Gonzales; Chris Hansen; Nick Hinrichsen; Sonya Jaquez Lewis; Chris Kolker; Janice Marchman; Dafna Michaelson Jenet; Kyle Mullica; Kevin Priola; Dylan Roberts; Robert Rodriguez; Tom Sullivan; Faith Winter; Rachel Zenzinger	-	-
Republican Party	6: Bob Gardner; Barbara Kirkmeyer; Paul Lundeen; Janice Rich; Cleave Simpson; Jim Smallwood	5: Mark Baisley; Byron Pelton; Rod Pelton; Kevin Van Winkle; Perry Will	1: Larry Liston
Total	29	5	1

May 4, 2024 vote in the Colorado House of Representatives
Political affiliation	Voted for	Voted against	Abstained/Not present
Democratic Party	44: Judy Amabile; Jennifer Bacon; Shannon Bird; Andrew Boesenecker; Kyle Brown; Chad Clifford; Monica Duran; Elisabeth Epps; Meg Froelich; Lorena Garcia; Eliza Hamrick; Tim Hernández; Leslie Herod; Iman Jodeh; Junie Joseph; Chris Kennedy; Cathy Kipp; Sheila Lieder; Mandy Lindsay; William Lindstedt; Meghan Lukens; Javier Mabrey; Bob Marshall; Matthew Martinez; Julia Marvin; Tisha Mauro; Julie McCluskie; Karen McCormick; Barbara McLachlan; David Ortiz; Jennifer Parenti; Naquetta Ricks; Manny Rutinel; Emily Sirota; Marc Snyder; Tammy Story; Brianna Titone; Alex Valdez; Elizabeth Velasco; Stephanie Vigil; Mike Weissman; Jenny Willford; Steven Woodrow; Mary Young	1: Regina English	1: Lindsey Daugherty
Republican Party	2: Matt Soper; Rick Taggart	13: Ryan Armagost; Scott Bottoms; Mary Bradfield; Brandi Bradley; Marc Catlin; Ken DeGraaf; Lisa Frizell; Anthony Hartsook; Richard Holtorf; Stephanie Luck; Mike Lynch; Don Wilson; Ty Winter	4: Rod Bockenfeld; Gabe Evans; Rose Pugliese; Ron Weinberg
Total	46	14	5

== Contents ==
=== Amendment ===
The amendment removed the text of Article II of the state constitution:

Section 31. Marriages - valid or recognized. ~~Only a union of one man and one woman shall be valid o~~~~r recognized as a marriage in this state.~~

=== Ballot question ===
The amendment appeared on the ballot as follows:

Amendment J (CONSTITUTIONAL)

Shall there be an amendment to the Colorado constitution removing the ban on same-sex marriage?

Enmienda J (CONSTITUCIONAL) - ¿Debe haber una enmienda a la constitución de Colorado que elimine la prohibición del matrimonio entre personas del mismo sexo?

YES/FOR - SÍ/EN FAVOR DE ()

NO/AGAINST - NO/EN CONTRA DE ()

== Campaign ==
=== Support ===
The campaign in favor of Amendment J was led by the organization Freedom to Marry Colorado. Additionally, the official state voter guide offered the argument that marriage is a basic right for all Coloradans and the Colorado Constitution should protect that right regardless of one's sexuality, particularly if the right to same-sex marriage is overturned by the US Supreme Court.

=== Opposition ===
There was no major organized opposition to Amendment J. However, the official state voter guide offered as an argument that marriage should be between one man and one woman and if Obergefell v. Hodges is overturned, the Colorado Constitution should reflect that.

== Endorsements ==
Yes

Statewide officials

- Jared Polis, Governor of Colorado (2019–present) (Democratic)

State legislators

- Mike Johnston, Mayor of Denver (2023–present) and former state senator from the 33rd district (2009–2017) (Democratic)
- Joann Ginal, state senator from the 14th district (2019–2025) (Democratic)
- Emily Sirota, state representative from the 9th district (2019–present) (Democratic)
- Brianna Titone, state representative from the 27th district (2019–present) (Democratic)
- Alex Valdez, state representative from the 5th district (2019–present) (Democratic)

Labor unions

- SEIU Local 105
- AFL-CIO Colorado
- Colorado Education Association

Organizations

- Independence Institute
- ACLU of Colorado
- Planned Parenthood Colorado

Political parties

- Colorado Working Families Party
- Green Party of Colorado

Newspapers

- Colorado Springs Gazette
- Denver Gazette
No

State legislators

- Scott Bottoms, state representative from the 15th district (2023–present) (Republican)

Organizations

- Focus on the Family

== Polling ==
Poll source	Date(s) administered	Sample size (Note: Key: A – all adults RV – registered voters LV – likely voters V – unclear)	Margin of error	Yes	No	Undecided
YouGov	October 18–30, 2024	754 (LV)	± 4.5%	54%	37%	9%

== Results ==
On November 5, 2024, at 7:00 PM MT, polls in Colorado closed. Amendment J required a simple majority to pass. On the same night, at 8:50 PM MT, the Associated Press projected, with 63.6% in favor, the passage of Amendment J. After all votes were tabulated, the Amendment passed with 64.3% in favor.

Amendment J
Choice	Votes	%
For	1,982,200	64.33
Against	1,099,228	35.67
Total	3,081,428	100.00

=== By county ===
County	For		Against		Margin		Total votes cast
County	#	%	#	%	#	%	Total votes cast
Adams	137,079	62.50%	82,231	37.50%	54,848	25.01%	219,310
Alamosa	3,555	50.05%	3,548	49.95%	7	0.10%	7,103
Arapahoe	209,491	66.73%	104,437	33.27%	105,054	33.46%	313,928
Archuleta	4,681	52.67%	4,207	47.33%	474	5.33%	8,888
Baca	467	24.44%	1,444	75.56%	-977	-51.13%	1,911
Bent	779	36.75%	1,341	63.25%	-562	-26.51%	2,120
Boulder	157,277	82.91%	32,408	17.09%	124,869	65.83%	189,685
Broomfield	33,291	73.17%	12,207	26.83%	21,084	46.34%	45,498
Chaffee	9,181	65.20%	4,901	34.80%	4,280	30.39%	14,082
Cheyenne	214	20.78%	816	79.22%	-602	-58.45%	1,030
Clear Creek	4,077	69.76%	1,767	30.24%	2,310	39.53%	5,844
Conejos	1,447	36.67%	2,499	63.33%	-1,052	-26.66%	3,946
Costilla	979	50.62%	955	49.38%	24	1.24%	1,934
Crowley	551	33.60%	1,089	66.40%	-538	-32.80%	1,640
Custer	1,580	42.13%	2,170	57.87%	-590	-15.73%	3,750
Delta	8,636	45.48%	10,352	54.52%	-1,716	-9.04%	18,988
Denver	284,747	81.57%	64,316	18.43%	220,431	63.15%	349,063
Dolores	500	36.85%	857	63.15%	-357	-26.31%	1,357
Douglas	143,288	60.60%	93,175	39.40%	50,113	21.19%	236,463
Eagle	19,703	73.86%	6,972	26.14%	12,731	47.73%	26,675
El Paso	206,664	55.75%	164,010	44.25%	42,654	11.51%	370,674
Elbert	8,281	41.65%	11,603	58.35%	-3,322	-16.71%	19,884
Fremont	10,693	43.17%	14,079	56.83%	-3,386	-13.67%	24,772
Garfield	18,314	62.37%	11,048	37.63%	7,266	24.75%	29,362
Gilpin	2,783	68.92%	1,255	31.08%	1,528	37.84%	4,038
Grand	5,936	61.64%	3,694	38.36%	2,242	23.28%	9,630
Gunnison	7,748	72.80%	2,895	27.20%	4,853	45.60%	10,643
Hinsdale	304	52.60%	274	47.40%	30	5.19%	578
Huerfano	2,158	50.93%	2,079	49.07%	79	1.86%	4,237
Jackson	291	36.79%	500	63.21%	-209	-26.42%	791
Jefferson	244,903	69.41%	107,952	30.59%	136,951	38.81%	352,855
Kiowa	204	24.73%	621	75.27%	-417	-50.55%	825
Kit Carson	1,000	28.20%	2,546	71.80%	-1,546	-43.60%	3,546
La Plata	23,792	68.98%	10,700	31.02%	13,092	37.96%	34,492
Lake	2,472	65.00%	1,331	35.00%	1,141	30.00%	3,803
Larimer	146,123	67.13%	71,534	32.87%	74,589	34.27%	217,657
Las Animas	3,532	47.74%	3,866	52.26%	-334	-4.51%	7,398
Lincoln	834	33.39%	1,664	66.61%	-830	-33.23%	2,498
Logan	3,383	34.61%	6,392	65.39%	-3,009	-30.78%	9,775
Mesa	44,569	50.19%	44,237	49.81%	332	0.37%	88,806
Mineral	372	52.10%	342	47.90%	30	4.20%	714
Moffat	2,340	36.91%	4,000	63.09%	-1,660	-26.18%	6,340
Montezuma	7,041	48.14%	7,586	51.86%	-545	-3.73%	14,627
Montrose	10,691	43.03%	14,153	56.97%	-3,462	-13.93%	24,844
Morgan	5,030	38.78%	7,939	61.22%	-2,909	-22.43%	12,969
Otero	3,487	40.27%	5,172	59.73%	-1,685	-19.46%	8,659
Ouray	2,739	68.19%	1,278	31.81%	1,461	36.37%	4,017
Park	6,559	55.94%	5,167	44.06%	1,392	11.87%	11,726
Phillips	646	28.92%	1,588	71.08%	-942	-42.17%	2,234
Pitkin	8,928	83.77%	1,730	16.23%	7,198	67.54%	10,658
Prowers	1,670	33.79%	3,273	66.21%	-1,603	-32.43%	4,943
Pueblo	41,641	50.83%	40,284	49.17%	1,357	1.66%	81,925
Rio Blanco	1,154	32.59%	2,387	67.41%	-1,233	-34.82%	3,541
Rio Grande	2,500	41.83%	3,476	58.17%	-976	-16.33%	5,976
Routt	11,849	74.62%	4,030	25.38%	7,819	49.24%	15,879
Saguache	1,869	58.52%	1,325	41.48%	544	17.03%	3,194
San Juan	402	72.96%	149	27.04%	253	45.92%	551
San Miguel	3,771	81.85%	836	18.15%	2,935	63.71%	4,607
Sedgwick	434	33.77%	851	66.23%	-417	-32.45%	1,285
Summit	13,411	79.37%	3,485	20.63%	9,926	58.75%	16,896
Teller	7,143	44.80%	8,802	55.20%	-1,659	-10.40%	15,945
Washington	687	25.34%	2,024	74.66%	-1,337	-49.32%	2,711
Weld	90,998	52.54%	82,190	47.46%	8,808	5.09%	173,188
Yuma	1,331	29.45%	3,189	70.55%	-1,858	-41.11%	4,520
Total	1,982,200	64.33%	1,099,228	35.67%	882,972	28.65%	3,081,428

== See also ==
- 2006 Colorado Amendment 43
- Same-sex marriage in Colorado
- 2024 California Proposition 3
- 2024 Hawaii Amendment 1
- 2024 United States ballot measures
