= 2026 Colorado Amendment 81 =

Amendment 81
- November 3, 2026
- Law Enforcement Communication with Federal Immigration Authorities
County results
Yes
80–90%
70–80%
60–70%
50–60%
No
70–80%
60–70%
50–60%

2026 Colorado Amendment 81 is a proposed amendment to the Colorado Constitution which will appear before voters in Colorado during the 2026 general election. If passed, the amendment would require that local law enforcement agencies in Colorado share information with ICE when a person is charged with a crime and their legal status is unclear, a practice which is currently illegal under Colorado law. As the ballot measure would add text to the state Constitution, it must be approved by 55% of voters to pass.

== Background ==
Currently, Colorado law restricts the ability of state and local law enforcement to cooperate with ICE. This includes a ban on police agencies sharing personal information with federal immigration officials unless they are explicitly order to by a judge. Amendment 81 would override existing Colorado law and require the Department of Homeland Security to be notified within 72 hours if a law enforcement agency within Colorado charges someone with a crime who has either been previously convicted of a felony or is being charged with certain violent crimes.

The proposed amendment was placed on the ballot through a citizen initiated petition funded by the conservative political group Advance Colorado. The group is responsible for seven other ballot measures which will be decided by voters in the same election. The main opposition to the group is led by the issue committee Colorado Communities First, who is backed by the Colorado Immigrant Rights Coalition and the ACLU of Colorado.

== Contents ==
The proposition appeared on the ballot as follows:

Shall there be an amendment to the Colorado Constitution requiring law enforcement to notify the department of homeland security when a person is charged with either a violent crime or any crime if the person has a prior felony conviction if law enforcement cannot determine that the person is lawfully present in the United States?

== Campaigns ==
=== Support ===
'Yes'

Newspapers

- The Colorado Springs Gazette

=== Opposition ===
'No'

Federal officials

- Jason Crow, U.S. representative from CO-06
- Brittany Pettersen, U.S. representative from CO-07

State senators

- Judy Amabile
- Matt Ball
- James Coleman
- Julie Gonzales
- Cathy Kipp
- Chris Kolker
- Janice Marchman
- Dylan Roberts
- Robert Rodriguez
- Katie Wallace
- Mike Weissman

State representatives

- Jennifer Bacon
- Andrew Boesenecker
- Chad Clifford
- Cecelia Espenoza
- Lorena Garcia
- Lindsay Gilchrist
- Lori Goldstein
- Jamie Jackson
- Sheila Lieder
- Javier Mabrey
- Matthew Martinez
- Julie McCluskie
- Karen McCormick
- Kenny Nguyen
- Jacque Phillips
- Gretchen Rydin
- Emily Sirota
- Rebekah Stewart
- Brianna Titone
- Elizabeth Velasco
- Jenny Willford
- Yara Zokaie

Organizations

- ACLU Colorado
- Colorado Education Association
- League of Women Voters Colorado
- Planned Parenthood Voted Colorado
- The Bell Policy Center

== Results ==
Results will begin being published after polls close on November 3, 2026 at 7:00 pm. Amendment 81 requires a 55% majority to pass.

Amendment 81
Choice
For
Against
Total

== See also ==
- 2026 United States ballot measures
- List of Colorado ballot measures
