= 2023 Colorado Proposition II =

Ballot measure in Colorado diverting nicotine revenue to fund preschools

Proposition II
- November 7, 2023
- Retain Nicotine Tax Revenue in Excess of Blue Book Estimate

Results
Choice	Votes	%
Yes	1,130,147	67.53%
No	543,405	32.47%
Total votes	1,673,452	100.00%
County results
For
80–90%
70–80%
60–70%
50–60%
Against
70–80%
60–70%
50–60%

2023 Colorado Proposition II was a successful a ballot measure referred to voters by the Colorado General Assembly regarding the retention of tax revenue collected from the sale of nicotine, tobacco, and vape products in Colorado. The measure requires that 23.65 million dollars the state was obligated to refund to wholesalers and distributors of these products be diverted to fund preschools within the state. On November 7, 2023, Colorado voters approved the proposition with roughly two-thirds of the electorate voting in favor.

== Background ==
In 2020, Colorado passed Proposition EE which raised taxes on nicotine, tobacco, and vape products to fund universal preschool and tobacco education programs. Proposition EE estimated that the tax would collect 186.5 million dollars within its first year, however it ended up generating 208 million dollars. Under Article X of the Colorado Constitution, the state was obligated to return the excess revenue to vendors it was collected from, plus interest. Furthermore, the state would have to lower the tax rate to match the initially anticipated quantity of revenue.

On April 10, 2023, Representatives Julie McCluskie and Emily Sirota and Senators Dominick Moreno and Rhonda Fields introduced House Bill 23-1290 to the Colorado General Assembly to refer the issue of the excess tax revenue to voters. The bill passed both houses of the Colorado General Assembly with all Republicans and three Democrats voting against the legislation. Governor Jared Polis signed the bill on June 2, 2023, resulting in Proposition II being on the November 2023 ballot. The bill stipulated that if Proposition II passed the excess revenue already generated, as well as any future excess revenue, would be transferred to funds for Colorado preschools. Additionally, it clarified that the tax rate set by Proposition EE would remain in place should Proposition II be approved by voters.

== Contents ==
The proposition appeared on the ballot as follows:

Without raising taxes, may the state retain and spend revenues from taxes on cigarettes, tobacco, and other nicotine products and maintain tax rates on cigarettes, tobacco, and other nicotine products and use these revenues to invest twenty-three million six hundred fifty thousand dollars to enhance the voluntary Colorado preschool program and make it widely available for free instead of reducing these tax rates and refunding revenues to cigarette wholesalers, tobacco product distributors, nicotine products distributors, and other taxpayers, for exceeding an estimate included in the ballot information booklet for proposition EE?

== Campaigns ==
=== Support ===
The main campaign to vote yes on Proposition II was led by the organization Preschool for all Coloradans. The organization contended that the passage of Proposition II would make preschool more widely available for Coloradan families and that the increased tax rate would lead to fewer youth and young adults using tobacco and nicotine products. The official state voter guide also included arguments to support Proposition II including the claim that more preschool funding will lead to children of different socioeconomic backgrounds being able to start kindergarten with similar educational foundations.

'Yes'

State officials

- Jared Polis, Governor of Colorado

State senators

- Jeff Bridges
- Janet Buckner
- James Coleman
- Lisa Cutter
- Tony Exum
- Steve Fenberg
- Rhonda Fields
- Chris Hansen
- Nick Hinrichsen
- Sonya Jaquez Lewis
- Dafna Michaelson Jenet
- Chris Kolker
- Janice Marchman
- Kyle Mullica
- Kevin Priola
- Dylan Roberts
- Tom Sullivan
- Faith Winter
- Rachel Zenzinger

State representatives

- Judy Amabile
- Jennifer Bacon
- Shannon Bird
- Andrew Boesenecker
- Kyle Brown
- Lindsey Daugherty
- Ruby Dickson
- Monica Duran
- Regina English
- Lorena Garcia
- Leslie Herod
- Junie Joseph
- Chris Kennedy
- Cathy Kipp
- Sheila Lieder
- Mandy Lindsay
- William Lindstedt
- Meghan Lukens
- Javier Mabrey
- Julie McCluskie
- Karen McCormick
- Barbara McLachlan
- Naquetta Ricks
- Emily Sirota
- Tammy Story
- Marc Snyder
- Brianna Titone
- Alex Valdez
- Elizabeth Velasco
- Stephanie Vigil (voted against HB23-1290)
- Mike Weissman
- Jenny Willford
- Steven Woodrow
- Mary Young

Local politicians

- Jeanne McQueeney, Eagle County Commissioner
- Anna Jo Garcia Haynes, former chair of the Denver Public Schools Early Childhood Council
- Adeeb Kahn, Executive Director of the Denver Economic, Development, and Opportunity office
- Elsa Holguín, President and CEO of the Denver Preschool Program

Newspapers

- The Denver Post
- The Grand Junction Daily Sentinel

Organizations

- American Heart Association
- American Lung Association
- Children’s Hospital Colorado
- Colorado Democratic Party
- Colorado Working Families Party
- League of Women Voters of Colorado
- Preschool for all Coloradans
- Save the Children

=== Opposition ===
There was no major organized campaign against Proposition II. However, the official state voter guide listed two main arguments against the proposition. The guide offered that Proposition II was an unnecessary expansion of government given that Colorado preschools were already fully funded and that the higher tax rate could harm those suffering from addiction.

'No'

Organizations

- The Centennial Institute at Colorado Christian University

== Results ==
Proposition II
Choice	Votes	%
For	1,130,147	67.53
Against	543,405	32.47
Total	1,673,552	100.00

=== Results by county ===
County	For		Against		Margin		Total votes cast
County	#	%	#	%	#	%	Total votes cast
Adams	67,340	66.79%	33,477	33.21%	33,863	33.59%	100,817
Alamosa	2,260	60.70%	1,463	39.30%	797	21.41%	3,723
Arapahoe	118,572	70.41%	49,829	29.59%	68,743	40.82%	168,401
Archuleta	3,722	70.83%	1,533	29.17%	2,189	41.66%	5,255
Baca	518	40.28%	768	59.72%	-250	-19.44%	1,286
Bent	609	46.60%	698	53.40%	-89	-6.81%	1,307
Boulder	97,034	82.62%	20,419	17.38%	76,615	65.23%	117,453
Broomfield	19,060	73.51%	6,869	26.49%	12,191	47.02%	25,929
Chaffee	6,453	68.90%	2,913	31.10%	3,540	37.80%	9,366
Cheyenne	183	27.77%	476	72.23%	-293	-44.46%	659
Clear Creek	2,294	67.35%	1,112	32.65%	1,182	34.70%	3,406
Conejos	1,277	58.98%	888	41.02%	389	17.97%	2,165
Costilla	753	65.71%	393	34.29%	360	31.41%	1,146
Crowley	448	39.68%	681	60.32%	-233	-20.64%	1,129
Custer	1,226	47.21%	1,371	52.79%	-145	-5.58%	2,597
Delta	5,870	52.93%	5,221	47.07%	649	5.85%	11,091
Denver	132,769	82.54%	28,090	17.46%	104,679	65.08%	160,859
Dolores	451	51.72%	421	48.28%	30	3.44%	872
Douglas	93,636	66.11%	47,993	33.89%	45,643	32.23%	141,629
Eagle	11,164	74.48%	3,825	25.52%	7,339	48.96%	14,989
El Paso	118,028	60.63%	76,656	39.37%	41,372	21.25%	194,684
Elbert	5,091	41.93%	7,050	58.07%	-1,959	-16.14%	12,141
Fremont	7,791	52.35%	7,092	47.65%	699	4.70%	14,883
Garfield	9,883	67.58%	4,741	32.42%	5,142	35.16%	14,624
Gilpin	1,557	60.73%	1,007	39.27%	550	21.45%	2,564
Grand	3,741	67.03%	1,840	32.97%	1,901	34.06%	5,581
Gunnison	5,228	77.05%	1,557	22.95%	3,671	54.10%	6,785
Hinsdale	244	61.77%	151	38.23%	93	23.54%	395
Huerfano	1,569	56.42%	1,212	43.58%	357	12.84%	2,781
Jackson	199	43.45%	259	56.55%	-60	-13.10%	458
Jefferson	138,609	67.85%	65,689	32.15%	72,920	35.69%	204,298
Kiowa	153	29.03%	374	70.97%	-221	-41.94%	527
Kit Carson	1,150	45.19%	1,395	54.81%	-245	-9.63%	2,545
La Plata	13,245	72.39%	5,052	27.61%	8,193	44.78%	18,297
Lake	1,355	65.30%	720	34.70%	635	30.60%	2,075
Larimer	87,262	70.49%	36,536	29.51%	50,726	40.97%	123,798
Las Animas	2,725	55.57%	2,179	44.43%	546	11.13%	4,904
Lincoln	535	35.38%	977	64.62%	-442	-29.23%	1,512
Logan	2,715	42.97%	3,604	57.03%	-889	-14.07%	6,319
Mesa	28,759	57.39%	21,354	42.61%	7,405	14.78%	50,113
Mineral	378	66.43%	191	33.57%	187	32.86%	569
Moffat	1,695	47.15%	1,900	52.85%	-205	-5.70%	3,595
Montezuma	5,042	60.73%	3,260	39.27%	1,782	21.46%	8,302
Montrose	7,832	53.23%	6,882	46.77%	950	6.46%	14,714
Morgan	3,126	43.71%	4,025	56.29%	-899	-12.57%	7,151
Otero	2,841	50.53%	2,781	49.47%	60	1.07%	5,622
Ouray	1,909	72.53%	723	27.47%	1,186	45.06%	2,632
Park	4,070	58.03%	2,944	41.97%	1,126	16.05%	7,014
Phillips	815	46.76%	928	53.24%	-113	-6.48%	1,743
Pitkin	4,358	83.30%	874	16.70%	3,484	66.59%	5,232
Prowers	1,576	47.67%	1,730	52.33%	-154	-4.66%	3,306
Pueblo	26,865	59.26%	18,467	40.74%	8,398	18.53%	45,332
Rio Blanco	747	37.86%	1,226	62.14%	-479	-24.28%	1,973
Rio Grande	1,853	54.53%	1,545	45.47%	308	9.06%	3,398
Routt	7,226	78.40%	1,991	21.60%	5,235	56.80%	9,217
Saguache	1,098	61.89%	676	38.11%	422	23.79%	1,774
San Juan	284	76.34%	88	23.66%	196	52.69%	372
San Miguel	2,578	84.28%	481	15.72%	2,097	68.55%	3,059
Sedgwick	356	43.20%	468	56.80%	-112	-13.59%	824
Summit	7,204	76.22%	2,248	23.78%	4,956	52.43%	9,452
Teller	6,309	55.85%	4,987	44.15%	1,322	11.70%	11,296
Washington	562	30.53%	1,279	69.47%	-717	-38.95%	1,841
Weld	44,547	56.63%	34,115	43.37%	10,432	13.26%	78,662
Yuma	1,298	43.14%	1,711	56.86%	-413	-13.73%	3,009
Total	1,130,047	67.53%	543,405	32.47%	586,642	35.06%	1,673,452

== See also ==
- 2020 Colorado Proposition EE
