= Consuelo Redhorse =

American politician

Member-elect of the Colorado House of Representatives from the 13th district
- Assuming office January 2027
- Succeeding: Julie McCluskie

Personal details
- Party: Democratic

Consuelo Redhorse is an American politician. She is the Democratic member-elect of the Colorado House of Representatives from the 13th district. Prior to her victory, she was a business professional and chair of the Summit School District Board of Education.

== Biography ==
Redhorse was born in Boulder. She was raised in Longmont, where she attended Longmont High School. She obtained her BA in Southwest studies (with an accounting minor) from Fort Lewis College. She became a bookkeeper in the small business sector, working for an accounting firm based in Boulder. She later became a part-time apartment rental professional in the real estate industry. She is also a board member of food security non-profit Smart Bellies.

In 2019, Redhorse was elected to the Summit School District Board of Education, remaining with them for six years. Her board member work includes curriculum and policy revisionment and superintendent recruitment. In July 2023, the BOE appointed Redhorse as president, a position she served for three years. In October 2023, she left a forum featuring several speaking BOE candidates after police were called on her after she remained despite being reportedly informed it was a private event; Redhorse said that she had RSVP'd for the supposedly-public forum amidst remarks that several BOE members and candidates "don't support Hispanic students".

In November 2025, Redhorse announced that she would run to replace term-limited Julie McCluskie in Colorado's 13th House of Representatives district in the 2026 election. She cited affordability, childcare, education, housing, public natural resources, and the state's rural mountainous region as campaign priorities. She won the June Democratic primary, narrowly defeating McCluskie's endorsee Chris Floyd 50.6% to 49.4%.

Redhorse defeated Republican candidate Miguel Martinez in the general election in November 2026. She is the first Navajo woman elected to the state house.

Redhorse is a member of the Navajo Nation. She moved to Summit County in 2011, and lives in Silverthorne.

== See also ==
- List of Native American politicians
- Native American women in politics
