= Tommy Butler (Colorado politician) =

American politician

Member-elect of the Colorado House of Representatives from the 50th district
- Assuming office January 2027
- Succeeding: Ryan Gonzalez

Personal details
- Born: 1989 or 1990 (age 36–37)
- Party: Democratic

Tommy Butler (born 1989 or 1990) is an American politician. He is the Representative-elect for district 50 of the Colorado House of Representatives, after defeating incumbent Ryan Gonzalez with 59.7% of the vote. Butler also represented Ward 1 on the Greeley City Council for six years, stepping down on March 17, 2026, to run for the Colorado House of Representatives.
