= Alice Ruble =

Colorado state legislator

Alice Ruble was a state legislator in Colorado. She served in the Colorado House of Representatives. She nominated Henry M. Teller for U.S. Senator in support of his re-election. She served in Colorado's 14th General Assembly

A Democrat, she was elected to represent Denver in 1902. John S. Shaw contested her election.

According to the Pawnee Courier-Dispatch in 1906 Alice Ruble was the tenth woman to be elected to the Colorado House of Representatives, was the only female Representative in 1902-03, all four subsequent female candidates were defeated 'by decisive majorities' and party leaders asserted that 'no woman will ever again be elected to the (Colorado) legislature'.

Alma Lafferty was elected to the House in 1909.
