= Colorado's 46th House of Representatives district =

American legislative district

Colorado's 46th State House of Representatives district
Representative
Tisha Mauro; D–Pueblo
- Demographics: 52% White; 2% Black; 41% Hispanic; 1% Asian; 0% Native American; 3% Multiracial
- Population (2024): 88,384

Colorado's 46th House of Representatives district is one of 65 districts in the Colorado House of Representatives. It has been represented by Tisha Mauro since 2023.
