= Colorado's 30th House of Representatives district =

American legislative district

Colorado's 30th State House of Representatives district
Representative
Rebekah Stewart; D–Lakewood
- Demographics: 61% White; 2% Black; 29% Hispanic; 4% Asian; 0% Native American; 4% Multiracial
- Population (2024): 86,829

Colorado's 30th House of Representatives district is one of 65 districts in the Colorado House of Representatives. It has been represented by Rebekah Stewart since 2025.
