= Colorado's 63rd House of Representatives district =

American legislative district

Colorado's 63rd State House of Representatives district
Representative
Dusty Johnson; R–Fort Morgan
- Demographics: 68% White; 2% Black; 26% Hispanic; 0% Asian; 0% Native American; 3% Multiracial
- Population (2024): 88,288

Colorado's 63rd House of Representatives district is one of 65 districts in the Colorado House of Representatives. It has been represented by Dusty Johnson since 2025.
