= Colorado's 27th House of Representatives district =

American legislative district

Colorado's 27th State House of Representatives district
Representative
Brianna Titone; D–Arvada
- Demographics: 79% White; 1% Black; 12% Hispanic; 4% Asian; 0% Native American; 4% Multiracial
- Population (2024): 90,176

Colorado's 27th House of Representatives district is one of 65 districts in the Colorado House of Representatives. It has been represented by Brianna Titone since 2019.

== Members ==
- Brianna Titone
- Danielle Varda
