= Iman Jodeh =

American politician

Iman Mohamad Jodeh
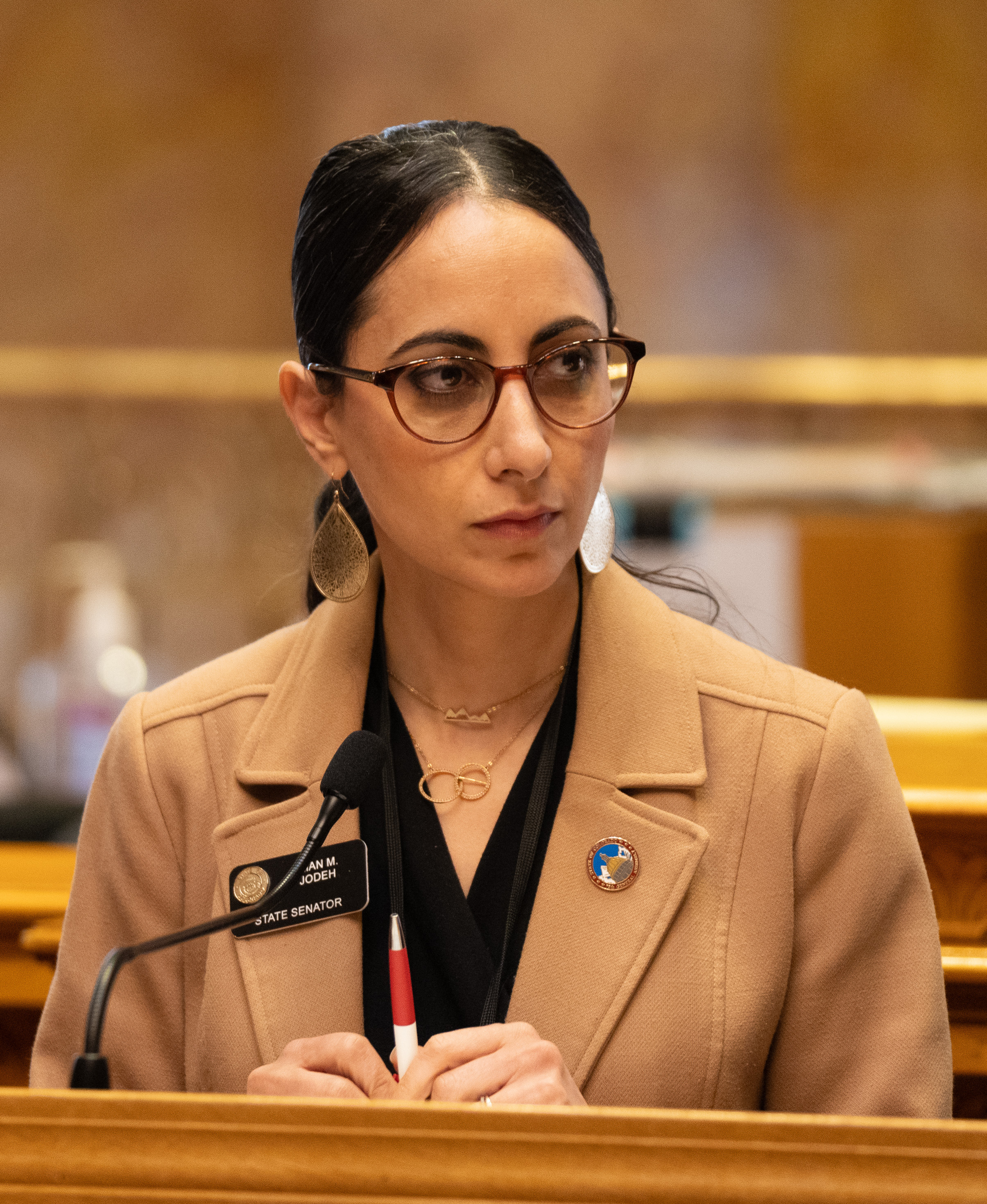
- Jodeh in 2025

Member of the Colorado Senate from the 29th district
- Incumbent
- Assumed office January 9, 2025
- Preceded by: Janet Buckner

Member of the Colorado House of Representatives from the 41st district
- In office January 13, 2021 – January 9, 2025
- Preceded by: Jovan Melton
- Succeeded by: Jamie Jackson

Personal details
- Born: Denver, Colorado, U.S.
- Party: Democratic
- Education: University of Colorado Denver (BA, MPP)
- Website: Campaign website

Iman Mohamad Jodeh is an American politician serving as a Democratic member of the Colorado Senate from the 29th district. Elected to the Colorado House of Representatives in 2020, she is the first Muslim elected to the legislature and assumed office on January 13, 2021. She became a Colorado State Senator on January 9, 2025.

== Early life and education ==
Jodeh was born in Denver, the daughter of Palestinian parents who immigrated to the United States in 1974. She grew up in neighboring Aurora, and graduated from Overland High School. She earned a Bachelor of Arts in political science and history in 2004 and Master of Public Policy from University of Colorado Denver in 2006.

== Career ==
Jodeh has worked as a community liaison for the Interfaith Alliance of Colorado. In 2008, she founded Meet the Middle East, a non-profit whose mission is to bridge understanding between Americans and what she says is the "most misunderstood region of the world."

== Colorado House of Representatives ==
A member of the Colorado Democratic Party, she was elected to represent the 41st district in the Colorado House of Representatives in the 2020 general election, and is the first Muslim lawmaker in the state's history. The district includes part of Aurora in Arapahoe County. In the election, she defeated her Republican opponent, winning 65.86% of the vote. During the 2021 legislative session, Jodeh co-sponsored a healthcare bill (Colorado Option) that would later be passed aimed at creating affordable standardized health insurance. Jodeh sponsored a successful bill that created the Colorado Office of New Americans within the Colorado Department of Labor and Employment. The office's stated purpose is to help immigrants and new residents integrate into their new communities and function as a resource for state leaders and community members.

In the 2022 Colorado House of Representatives election, Jodeh was re-elected to represent the 41st district. On November 12, 2022, Jodeh was selected as majority co-whip of the state House.

Jodeh's political policies include working on access to healthcare (including mental health), jobs, protecting civil rights, affordable housing, and education.

Jodeh served in the Colorado House of Representatives until January 9, 2025, at which point she was appointed to fill the vacancy in the Colorado Senate left by the resignation of Senator Janet Buckner.

== Colorado Senate ==
On November 21, 2024, State Senator Janet Buckner announced that she would resign from the Colorado State Senate effective January 9, 2025, one day after the start of the 75th General Assembly. On January 6, 2025, a vacancy committee selected Jodeh to fill the seat left vacant beginning January 9, 2025.
