= Colorado's 53rd House of Representatives district =

American legislative district

Colorado's 53rd State House of Representatives district
Representative
| Andrew Boesenecker; D–Fort Collins |
- Demographics: 79% White; 1% Black; 12% Hispanic; 3% Asian; 0% Native American; 4% Multiracial
- Population (2024): 91,370

Colorado's 53rd House of Representatives district is one of 65 districts in the Colorado House of Representatives. It has been represented by Andrew Boesenecker since April 28, 2021.
