= Colorado's 65th House of Representatives district =

American legislative district

Colorado's 65th State House of Representatives district
Representative
Lori Garcia Sander; R–Eaton
- Demographics: 79% White; 1% Black; 15% Hispanic; 1% Asian; 0% Native American; 3% Multiracial
- Population (2024): 100,781

Colorado's 65th House of Representatives district is one of 65 districts in the Colorado House of Representatives. It has been represented by Lori Garcia Sander since 2025.
