= Colorado's 52nd House of Representatives district =

American legislative district

Colorado's 52nd State House of Representatives district
Representative
Yara Zokaie; D–Fort Collins
- Demographics: 76% White; 1% Black; 14% Hispanic; 4% Asian; 0% Native American; 5% Multiracial
- Population (2024): 89,198

Colorado's 52nd House of Representatives district is one of 65 districts in the Colorado House of Representatives. It has been represented by Yara Zokaie since 2025.
