= Colorado's 39th House of Representatives district =

American legislative district

Colorado's 39th State House of Representatives district
Representative
Brandi Bradley; R–Littleton
- Demographics: 79% White; 2% Black; 8% Hispanic; 6% Asian; 0% Native American; 4% Multiracial
- Population (2024): 93,359

Colorado's 39th House of Representatives district is one of 65 districts in the Colorado House of Representatives. It has been represented by Brandi Bradley since 2023.
