= Lori Goldstein (politician) =

American politician

Member of the Colorado House of Representatives from the 29th district
- Incumbent
- Assumed office January 14, 2026
- Preceded by: Shannon Bird

Adams 12 Five Star Schools School Board Member
- Incumbent
- Assumed office December 2019

Personal details
- Born: Chicago, Illinois
- Party: Democratic

Lori Goldstein is an American politician, member of the Colorado House of Representatives, and President of the Adams 12 Board of Education.

== Biography ==
Goldstein was born in Chicago, Illinois, and raised in Sioux Falls, South Dakota. Goldstein formerly worked as a public school teacher, and later served as the head of a teachers' union. She is President of the Adams 12 Board of Education, where she has served for six years.

On January 11, 2026, she was appointed to the Colorado House of Representatives to serve out the final year of Shannon Bird's term, following Bird's resignation to run for U.S. House. She is Jewish.
