= Danielle Varda =

American politician

Member-elect of the Colorado House of Representatives from the 27th district
- Assuming office January 2027
- Succeeding: Brianna Titone

Personal details
- Party: Democratic
- Website: www.vardaforcolorado.com

Danielle M. Varda is an American politician. A member of the Democratic Party, she is the member-elect for the 27th district of the Colorado House of Representatives. Varda is an Associate Professor at the School of Public Affairs at University of Colorado Denver.
