= Colorado's 56th House of Representatives district =

American legislative district

Colorado's 56th State House of Representatives district
Representative
Chris Richardson; R–Elbert County
- Demographics: 76% White; 2% Black; 16% Hispanic; 1% Asian; 0% Native American; 5% Multiracial
- Population (2024): 91,014

Colorado's 56th House of Representatives district is one of 65 districts in the Colorado House of Representatives. It has been represented by Chris Richardson since 2025.
