= Colorado's 21st House of Representatives district =

American legislative district

Colorado's 21st State House of Representatives district
Representative
Mary Bradfield; R–Colorado Springs
- Demographics: 57% White; 9% Black; 24% Hispanic; 3% Asian; 0% Native American; 6% Multiracial
- Population (2024): 87,003

Colorado's 21st House of Representatives district is one of 65 districts in the Colorado House of Representatives. It has been represented by Mary Bradfield since 2021.
