= Colorado's 50th House of Representatives district =

American legislative district

Colorado's 50th State House of Representatives district
Representative
Ryan Gonzalez; R–Greeley
- Demographics: 42% White; 3% Black; 50% Hispanic; 1% Asian; 0% Native American; 2% Multiracial
- Population (2024): 86,974

Colorado's 50th House of Representatives district is one of 65 districts in the Colorado House of Representatives. It has been represented by Ryan Gonzalez since 2025.
