= Kenny Nguyen =

Vietnamese American artist

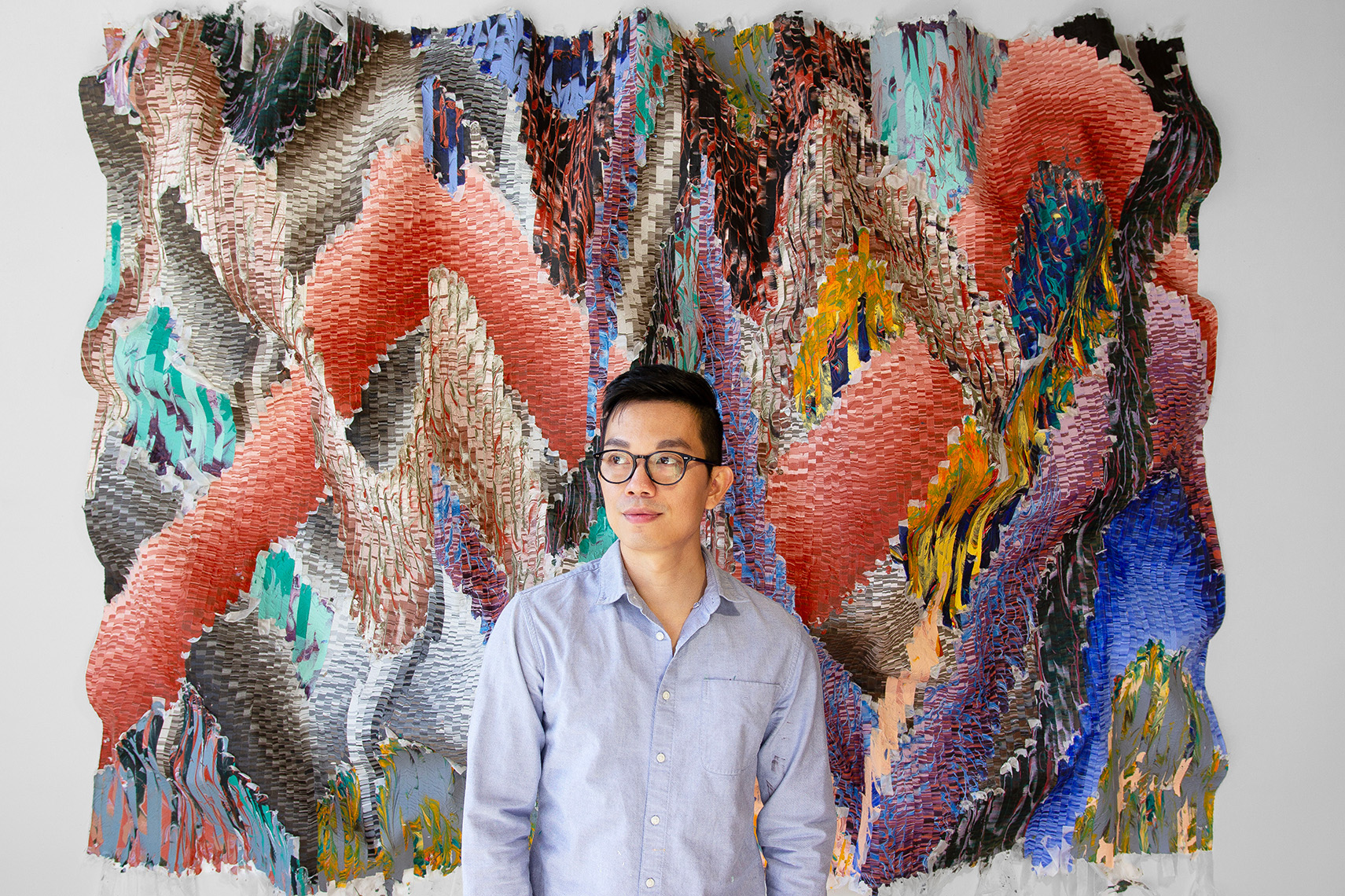
- Born: 1990 (age 35–36); Bên Tre Province, Vietnam
- Education: University of Architecture Ho Chi Minh City, University of North Carolina
- Awards: Asian Art in London's Modern & Contemporary Asian Art Award (2024), Excellence Asia Contemporary Young Artist Award (2016)
- Website: http://www.kennynguyen.org/

Kenny Nguyen Quoctrung "Kenny" Nguyen (born 1990, Bên Tre Province, Vietnam) is a Vietnamese-American mixed-media artist and painter known for his process of creating dimensional artwork through layered, painted silk strips. His work explores themes of cultural identity, displacement, and integration, influenced by his personal journey from rural Vietnam to the United States.

== Early life and education ==
Nguyen was raised on a coconut farm in the Mekong Delta region of southern Vietnam, where silk cultivation was part of his early surroundings. He initially pursued fashion design at the University of Architecture Ho Chi Minh City in 2007. In 2010, Nguyen and his family relocated to Charlotte, North Carolina. This transition led him to explore themes of reinvention in his art. He studied fine art and completed a BFA in Painting at the University of North Carolina at Charlotte in 2015.

== Artistic style and medium ==
Nguyen refers to his work as "deconstructed paintings"—three-dimensional textural pieces created by tearing silk into hundreds of strips, dipping them in acrylic paint, and attaching them onto raw canvas. He constructs undulating, sculptural surfaces that can be displayed flat or three-dimensionally. Silk plays a central role in Nguven's practice. He also uses lesser-known Vietnamese color names such as "màu lúa chín" (harvest-ripened rice field) or "khói lam chiều" (evening smoke blue) to inform his palette.

== Career and exhibitions ==
Nguyen has exhibited extensively in the U.S. and internationally. Solo exhibitions include:

- Confluence at the Branch Museum of Design (Richmond, VA, 2025)
- The Divine Eye at the Halsey Institute of Contemporary Art (Charleston, NC, 2025)
- Adaptations at the Mint Museum (Charlotte, NC, 2024-2025)
- Mother Tongue at Sundaram Tagore Gallery (NYC, NY, 2025)
- Eruption at Sundaram Tagore Gallery, (Singapore, 2024)
- Cham: Mapping Identity at Sugarlift Gallery (NYC, NY, 2024)
- Home/land at Sugarlift Gallery (NYC, NY, 2023)
- Kenny Nguyen: Identity Sozo Gallery (Charlotte, NC, 2021)

His work has also been featured in group exhibitions at institutions such as Saatchi Gallery (London, UK), Brooklyn Museum (New York), Sejong Museum of Art (Seoul), CICA Museum (South Korea), Kunstwerk Carlshütte (Germany), Museum of Contemporary Art Jacksonville, LaGrange Art Museum (Georgia), and the United States Capitol Complex.

== Awards, residencies, and recognition ==
Nguyen's work has received awards, including:

- College of Arts + Architecture’s 2025 Distinguished Alumni Award in Art (2025)
- Asian Art in London's Modern & Contemporary Asian Art Award presented by Sotheby's (2024)
- Nomination for the Joan Mitchell Fellowship (2023)
- Excellence Asia Contemporary Young Artist Award (Sejong Museum of Art, 2016)

Residencies and fellowships include support from the Ragdale Foundation, The Hambidge Center, Vermont Studio Center, Gil Artist Residency in Iceland, Château d'Orquevaux in France, and AIR Guidiguada in Spain.

== Personal life ==
Quoctrung "Kenny" Nguyen is based in Concord, North Carolina, where he maintains his studio practice. As of 2026, his studio is located in a former textile mill that dates back to the 1880's.
