= Max Brooks (politician) =

American politician

Member of the Colorado House of Representatives from the 45th district
- Incumbent
- Assumed office January 8, 2025
- Preceded by: Lisa Frizell

Personal details
- Party: Republican
- Website: Campaign website

Max Brooks is an American politician from Castle Rock, Colorado, U.S. A Republican, Brooks is the representative for Colorado House of Representatives District 45, which includes the Douglas County communities of Castle Rock, The Pinery, and Castle Pines Village.

== Background ==
Brooks lives in Castle Rock and is a member of the Castle Rock Town Council. He was first elected to the council in 2022 and represents District 5. He has also served on town boards and commissions and on the boards of other organizations. He works in advertising and marketing for KOA, a radio station in Denver.

== Elections ==
In the 2024 Republican primary election for Colorado House of Representatives District 45, Brooks defeated opponent Bill Jack, winning 55.72% of the total votes cast.

In the general election, Brooks defeated his Democratic Party opponent, winning 62.26% of the total votes cast.
