= Amy Paschal =

American politician

Member of the Colorado House of Representatives from the 18th district
- Incumbent
- Assumed office January 8, 2025
- Preceded by: Marc Snyder

Personal details
- Party: Democratic

Amy Paschal is an American politician. She has served as a member of the Colorado House of Representatives since January 2025, representing the 18th district. She is a member of the Democratic Party.
