= Colorado's 29th House of Representatives district =

American legislative district

Colorado's 29th State House of Representatives district
Representative
Lori Goldstein; D
- Demographics: 71% White; 1% Black; 18% Hispanic; 5% Asian; 0% Native American; 4% Multiracial
- Population (2024): 87,800

Colorado's 29th House of Representatives district is one of 65 districts in the Colorado House of Representatives. It has been represented by Lori Goldstein since 2026.
