= Katie Stewart (politician) =

American politician

Member of the Colorado House of Representatives from the 59th district
- Incumbent
- Assumed office January 8, 2025
- Preceded by: Barbara Hall McLachlan

Personal details
- Born: San Francisco, California
- Party: Democratic
- Education: Bellevue East High School
- Website: https://www.katieforcolorado.com/

Katie Stewart is an American politician who was elected member of the Colorado House of Representatives for the 59th district in 2024. Her district covers Archuleta, La Plata and San Juan counties and most of Montezuma County.

Stewart is a fourth-generation Durangoan. She and her husband Dan have five children.
