= Michael Carter (Colorado politician) =

American politician

Member of the Colorado House of Representatives from the 36th district
- Incumbent
- Assumed office January 8, 2025
- Preceded by: Mike Weissman

Personal details
- Born: Austin, Texas
- Party: Democratic
- Education: University of New Mexico (BA); University of Denver (JD)
- Website: https://www.carterforcolorado.com/

Michael Carter is an American politician who was elected member of the Colorado House of Representatives for the 36th district in 2024.

Carter is a third-generation Army Veteran. He is an Aurora defense attorney. He currently sits on the board for Aurora Public Schools. Carter holds bachelor's degrees in Political Science and African-American Studies from the University of New Mexico, as well as a J.D. degree from the University of Denver.
