= Lori Goldstein =

American journalist

- Occupation: Fashion designer
- Known for: "Everything goes with anything"
- Label: LOGO by Lori Goldstein for QVC
- Awards: VH1 Fashion and Media award for best styling of Madonna's "Take A Bow" music video
- Website: LoriGoldstein.com

Lori Goldstein is an American fashion stylist, editor, designer of LOGO by Lori Goldstein for QVC, and author of 'Lori Goldstein: Style Is Instinct'. She has frequently collaborated with photographers Steven Meisel and Annie Leibovitz, creating well-known ad campaigns and editorials. She was also the first agency-signed stylist, signing with Art + Commerce, now a division of IMG.

== Life and career ==
Goldstein was born in Columbus, Ohio and got her first fashion job working at Fred Segal in Los Angeles. While accompanying Segal on a buying trip to New York, she decided to move to New York City to launch her fashion career. She then started her editorial work at Vanity Fair and Allure magazine, as well as collaborating with Annie Leibovitz on a series of GAP and American Express ad campaigns and beginning her partnership with Steven Meisel on a number of projects, including their Valley of the Dolls-inspired ad for Versace.

She has styled campaigns for high-end brands such as Prada, Dolce & Gabbana, Hermès, Tiffany & Co, Versace, Elie Tahari, Fendi, Yves Saint Laurent, Vera Wang, BCBG Max Azria, Roberto Cavalli, Harry Winston, Burberry, Nina Ricci (brand) and Valentino. She held contributing editor positions at Elle Magazine, W Magazine, and Vogue Italia, and styled editorials for Harper's Bazaar, i-D, Vogue China and Los Angeles Times Magazine.

Goldstein worked extensively with Mario Testino, her former roommate, styling Madonna's 1995 Versace ads, Ray of Light and Something to Remember albums, all photographed by Testino. Goldstein received the VH1 Fashion and Media award for best styling of Madonna's "Take A Bow" music video.

== QVC ==
LOGO by Goldstein debuted on QVC in 2009, when the network teamed up with Mercedes-Benz Fashion Week. The line covers apparel, jewelry, footwear, eyewear, and home decor items.

In 2014, the brand was awarded "Apparel Product Concept of the Year" and Goldstein named QVC Ambassador. In 2015, LOGO was allotted a regular Monday primetime show on QVC as well as an afternoon edition show on Thursdays.
