= Lisa Feret =

American politician

Member of the Colorado House of Representatives from the 24th district
- Incumbent
- Assumed office January 8, 2025
- Preceded by: Lindsay Daugherty

Personal details
- Party: Democratic
- Education: Colorado State University (BSW); Boston College (MSW)

Lisa Feret (née Smith; born July 31, 1988) is an American politician and social worker. She has been a member of the Colorado House of Representatives since January 2025, representing the 24th district, which includes portions of Adams and Jefferson counties, including the communities of Arvada and Fairmount. She was previously a member of the Arvada City Council. She is a member of the Democratic Party.

== Background and education ==
Feret was born in Hartford, Connecticut. Feret served in the United States Air Force as a Security Forces Leader from 2007 to 2010. She earned a Bachelor of Social Work degree from Colorado State University in 2013 and a Master of Social Work degree from Boston College in 2018. As a social worker, Feret worked to distribute hand sanitizer to local fire stations, nonprofit organizations, and healthcare providers during the COVID-19 pandemic. She married her husband Eli Feret after meeting him while volunteering for Team Rubicon. They have a daughter together. In 2022, as a member of Team Rubicon's Operation White Stork, Feret distributed medical supplies and evacuated refugees from Ukraine. Feret was elected to the Arvada City Council in November 2021. On January 4, 2023, Feret announced her candidacy for the representative of House District 24.

== Colorado General Assembly ==
Feret was elected to Colorado House District 24 in November 2024 and was sworn into office in January 2025 to serve as a member of the Colorado House of Representatives. She currently serves on the House Health and Human Services and State Veterans and Military Affairs Committees. During her tenure in the Colorado General Assembly, Feret has sponsored or co-sponsored legislative efforts focusing on Healthcare. Other bills Feret sponsored in 2025 include efforts to reduce food waste and increase stockpiles of emergency supplies in Colorado. During the 2026 session, Feret sponsored efforts to update Health First Colorado, Colorado's Medicaid program, and increase accessibility of emergency medical services by expanding patient care services and increasing availability in rural Colorado.
