= Lori Garcia Sander =

American politician from Colorado

Member of the Colorado House of Representatives from the 65th district
- Incumbent
- Assumed office January 8, 2025
- Preceded by: Mike Lynch

Personal details
- Party: Republican
- Website: garciasanderforhouse.com

Lori Garcia Sander is an American politician from Eaton, Colorado. A Republican, Sander represents Colorado House of Representatives District 65, which includes parts of Weld and Larimer counties, including the communities of Windsor, Wellington, Severance, Tinmath, and Eaton.

== Background ==
Sander lives in Eaton, Colorado, with her husband. She is a retired public school teacher and school administrator. Together with her husband, she owns a vintage car parts company. They have an organic apple orchard on their property in Eaton, and they lease land for cattle grazing in Red Feather Lakes.

== Elections ==
In the 2024 Republican primary election for Colorado House of Representatives District 65, Sander defeated opponent Trent Lane Leisy, winning 62.43% of the votes.

In the general election, Sander defeated Democrat Will Walters, winning 62.73% of the vote.

== Controversies ==
Sander made derogatory comments on photos of representative Yara Zokaie that were posted in a group chat by Representative Ryan Armagost, who subsequently resigned before the 2025 Special Legislative Session. Sander later apologized, stating that her comment "was inappropriate, she regretted it and she apologized to Zokaie."
