= Carlos Barron (politician) =

American politician

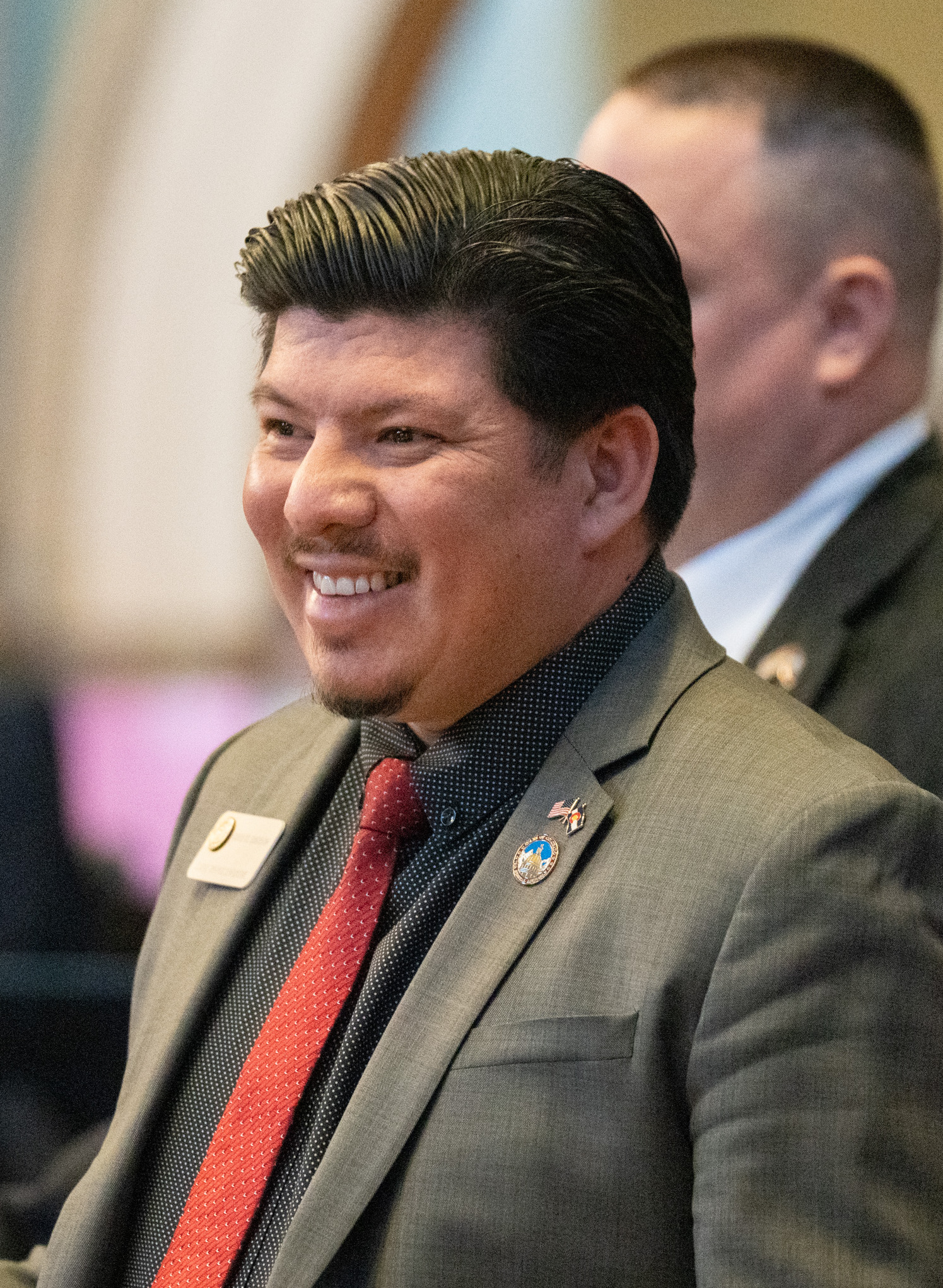

Member of the Colorado House of Representatives from the 48th district
- Incumbent
- Assumed office January 8, 2025
- Preceded by: Gabe Evans

Personal details
- Born: 1985 (age 40–41) Salamanca, Guanajuato, Mexico
- Party: Republican
- Profession: Business owner Manager
- Website: www.carlosforcolorado.com

Carlos Barron is an American politician from Fort Lupton, Colorado, U.S. A Republican, Barron is the representative for Colorado House of Representatives District 48, which includes parts of Weld and Adams counties including the communities of Brighton, Lochbuie, Fort Lupton, Todd Creek, Gilcrest, Evans, LaSalle, Kersey, Keenesburg, Hudson and Platteville.

== Background ==
Barron emigrated from Guanajuato, Mexico to the United States with his family when he was an infant. He lives in Fort Lupton, Colorado, with his wife and three children where he is an elected city council member. Previously, he served on the city's planning commission. He works as the general manager of his father's company, which is part of the oil and gas industry, and has been with the firm for 23 years.

== Elections ==
In the 2024 Republican primary election for Colorado House of Representatives District 48, Barron ran unopposed.

In the general election, Barron also ran unopposed.
