= Larry Don Suckla =

American politician

Member of the Colorado House of Representatives from the 58th district
- Incumbent
- Assumed office January 8, 2025
- Preceded by: Marc Catlin

Board of County Commissioners of Montezuma County
- In office January 11, 2013 – January 5, 2021

Personal details
- Party: Republican
- Profession: Farmer; Rancher
- Website: Campaign website

Larry Don Suckla is an American politician from Montezuma County, Colorado, U.S. A Republican, Suckla represents Colorado House of Representatives District 58, a geographically large district which includes all or part of the western Colorado counties of Delta, Dolores, Gunnison, Hinsdale, Montezuma, Montrose, Ouray, and San Miguel.

== Background ==
Suckla is a farmer and rancher from Cortez, in the southwestern corner of Colorado. He has also worked as a volunteer firefighter/EMT in Lewis and Arriola, Colorado and has experience in logging, construction, and landscaping. He served as a Montezuma County commissioner for eight years, from 2013–2021, and in 2017 he was named Colorado County Commissioner of the Year by his fellow commissioners across the state.

== Political career ==
Suckla served two four-year terms as Montezuma County Commissioner from January 2013 to January 2021.

In 2024, he ran to represent District 58 in the 2024 Colorado House of Representatives election. In the primary election, he defeated Republican opponent J. Mark Roeber, winning 6,489 votes (50.01%) to Roeber's 6,486 (49.99%) votes. The narrow three-vote margin triggered an automatic recount of the votes, and the recount confirmed Suckla's three-vote victory.

In the general election, Suckla defeated Democrat Kathleen Curry, winning 54.59% of the votes.

== Electoral history ==
=== Montezuma County Commissioner ===
2012 Montezuma County Commissioner election, district 3
Candidate	Votes	%
Larry Don Suckla	5,324	46.07%
Dewayne Findley	4,627	40.04%
Greg Kemp	1,606	13.90%
Total votes	11,554	100.00%
Majority	697	6.03%

2016 Montezuma County Commissioner election, district 3
Candidate	Votes	%
Larry Don Suckla (incumbent)	7,764	100.00%

=== Colorado House of Representatives ===
2024 Colorado State House 58th District Republican Primary
Party	Candidate	Votes	%
Republican	Larry Don Suckla	6,489	50.01%
Republican	J. Mark Roeber	6,486	49.99%
Total votes		12,975	100.00%
Majority		3	0.02%

2024 Colorado State House 58th District General Election
Party	Candidate	Votes	%
Republican	Larry Don Suckla	30,170	54.59%
Democratic	Kathleen Curry	25,100	45.41%
Total votes		55,270	100.00%
Majority		5,070	9.17%
