= Shannon Bird =

American politician from Colorado

Member of the Colorado House of Representatives
- In office January 4, 2019 – January 5, 2026
- Preceded by: Faith Winter
- Succeeded by: Lori Goldstein
- Constituency: 35th district (2019–2023); 29th district (2023–2026)

Personal details
- Born: April 23, 1969 (age 57) Reno, Nevada, U.S.
- Party: Democratic
- Education: University of Colorado, Boulder (BA); University of Colorado, Denver (MS, MBA); University of Denver (JD)
- Website: https://shannonbird.com/

Shannon Kathleen Bird (born April 23, 1969) is an American politician who was a member of the Colorado House of Representatives, where she represented the 29th district from 2019 to 2026.

== Biography ==
Bird was born in Reno, Nevada, and was raised by her mother and grandmother. Her family later moved to Colorado. She attended the University of Colorado Boulder and graduated with a B.A. in economics and earned a M.S. in finance and a M.B.A. from the University of Colorado Denver. She graduated with a J.D. from the University of Denver.

From 2015 to 2019, Bird served as a member in the Westminster City Council.

== Colorado legislature ==
From 2021 until her resignation in 2026, Bird served on the House Finance Committee. In 2022, Bird was selected to fill one of the vacant seats on the Joint Budget Committee for her term starting in January 2023. Her legislative focus included affordable housing, healthcare, education, transportation and public safety.

Bird was elected in the general election on November 6, 2018, winning 59 percent of the vote over 37 percent of Republican candidate Bruce Baker. She won re-election in 2020 with 62% of the vote and was re-elected again in 2022 with over 61% of the vote.

== 2026 congressional race ==
She ran in the 2026 election to represent Colorado's 8th congressional district and resigned from the Colorado House in January 2026 in order to focus on her congressional campaign. However, in the primary election held June 30, 2026, she was defeated by fellow Democrat Manny Rutinel.

== Personal life ==
Bird is an attorney. She is married and has two children.
