= Janet Buckner =

American politician in Colorado

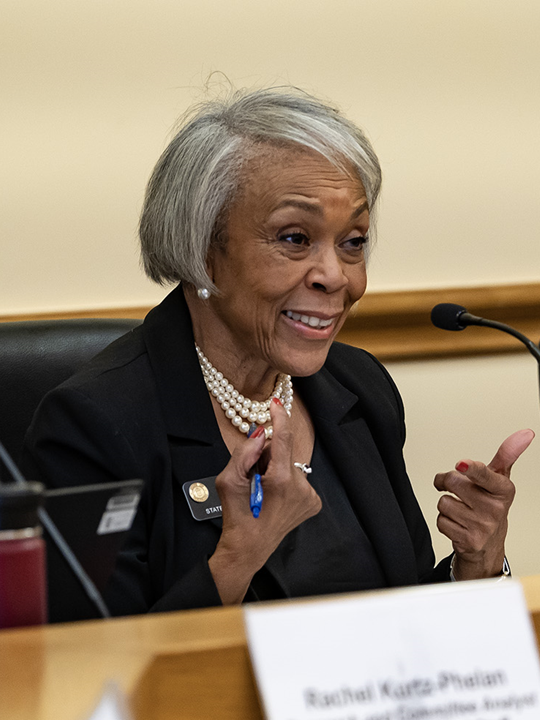

Member of the Colorado Senate from the 29th district
- In office January 9, 2023 – January 9, 2025
- Preceded by: Redistricted
- Succeeded by: Iman Jodeh

Member of the Colorado Senate from the 28th district
- In office January 13, 2021 – January 9, 2023
- Preceded by: Nancy Todd
- Succeeded by: Redistricted

Speaker pro tempore of the Colorado House of Representatives
- In office January 4, 2019 – January 13, 2021
- Preceded by: Jessie Danielson
- Succeeded by: Adrienne Benavidez

Member of the Colorado House of Representatives from the 40th district
- In office July 15, 2015 – January 13, 2021
- Preceded by: John Buckner
- Succeeded by: Naquetta Ricks

Personal details
- Party: Democratic
- Spouse: John Buckner
- Education: Ball State University (BA)

Janet Buckner is an American politician and a former Democratic member of the Colorado Senate representing District 29, which includes a part of Aurora in Arapahoe County. During the 2020 reapportionment process, Buckner's residence moved from senate district 28 to senate district 29. Earlier, she represented District 28 from January 2021 to January 2023. Before her state senate tenure, she was a member of the Colorado House of Representatives. She represented District 40, which covered a portion of Arapahoe County, from July 15, 2015, to January 13, 2021.

== Career ==
Buckner was appointed to her house seat in 2015 to replace her husband John Buckner after his death in office; she kept the seat in the 2016 elections. She was a professional speech and language therapist until her retirement in 2007.

In the state house, Buckner served as the vice chair of the House Education Committee and also served on the House Health, Insurance, & Environment Committee.

After her appointment to her House seat in 2015, Buckner was elected to keep her seat in 2016, winning with 57.69% of the vote against Republican opponent Todd Brophy. During the 2018-2020 session, Buckner served as the Speaker pro Tempore of the House of Representatives

On November 21, 2024, less than three weeks after being re-elected, Buckner announced that she would resign from the state senate on January 9, 2025, one day after she is sworn in for the 2025 session. On January 6, 2025, a vacancy committee selected State Representative Iman Jodeh to succeed Buckner beginning January 9, 2025.

Colorado House of Representatives
Preceded by Jessie Danielson	Speaker pro tempore of the Colorado House of Representatives; 2019–2021	Succeeded by Adrienne Benavidez
