= Chris Kennedy (Colorado politician) =

American politician

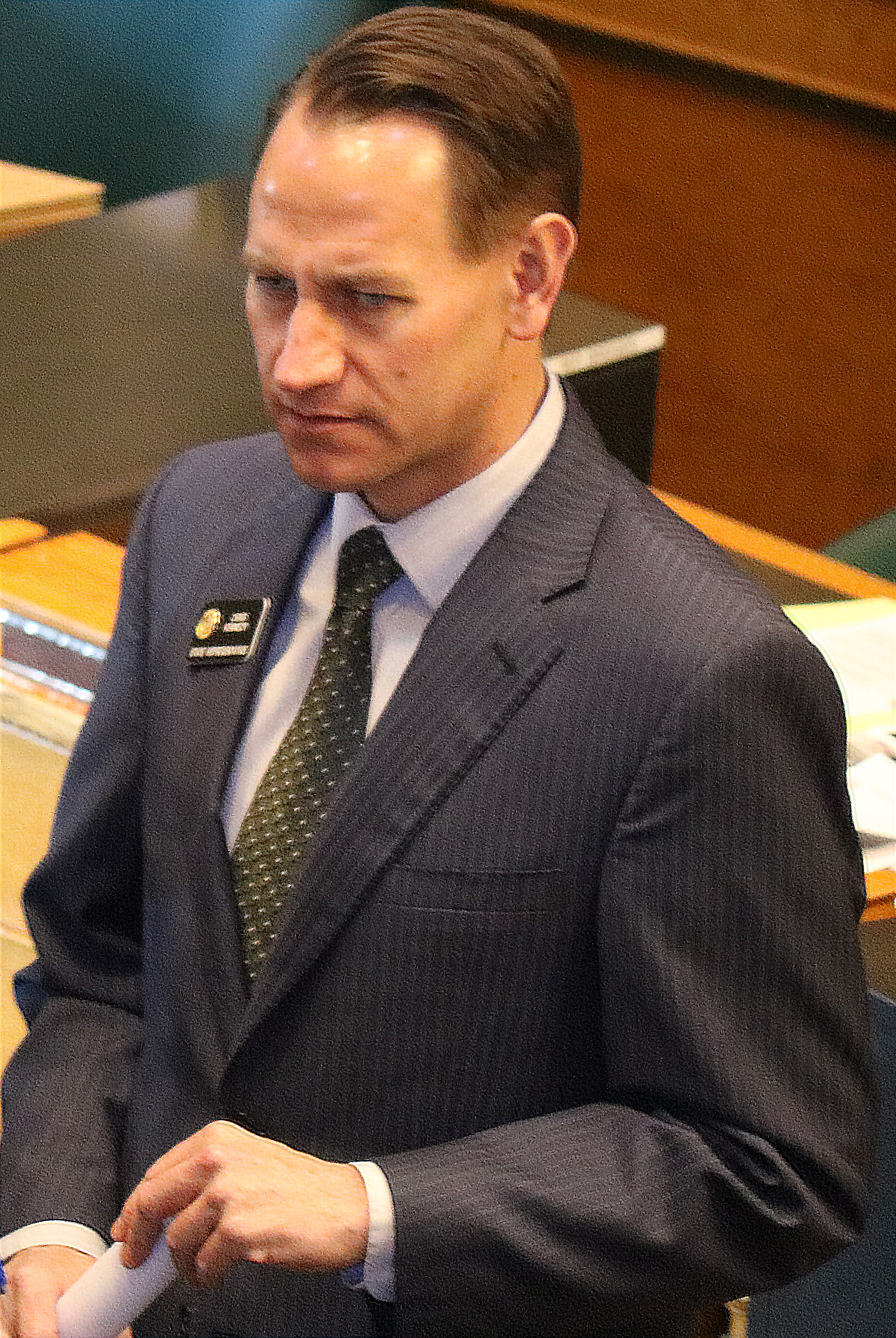

Speaker pro tempore of the Colorado House of Representatives
- In office January 9, 2023 – January 8, 2025
- Preceded by: Adrienne Benavidez
- Succeeded by: Andrew Boesenecker

Member of the Colorado House of Representatives from the 30th district
- In office January 9, 2023 – January 8, 2025
- Preceded by: Redistricted
- Succeeded by: Rebekah Stewart

Member of the Colorado House of Representatives from the 23rd district
- In office January 11, 2017 – January 9, 2023
- Preceded by: Max Tyler
- Succeeded by: Redistricted

Personal details
- Party: Democratic
- Education: University of Colorado, Boulder (BS, MA)

Chris deGruy Kennedy is a Democratic member of the Colorado House of Representatives. He represents house district 30, which includes the Jefferson County communities of Lakewood and Edgewater. Prior to reapportionment implemented in 2023, he represented the 23rd district, which covered a portion of Jefferson County. He was first elected to the state house in 2016, succeeding Max Tyler.

A Lakewood resident, Kennedy attended the University of Colorado Boulder and was an engineer before he entered politics. He has served as Democratic chairman of Jefferson County and ran U.S. Representative Ed Perlmutter's 2014 reelection campaign.

In his first term, Kennedy served on the House Finance Committee and the House Health, Insurance, and Environment Committee.

In the 72nd General Assembly, Kennedy was elected as the Assistant Majority Leader and serves as Chair of the State, Veterans, & Military Affairs Committee. Kennedy also serves on the Appropriations Committee. For the 74th General Assembly session, Kennedy was appointed to the position of speaker pro tempore for the Colorado House of Representatives.

== Elections ==
Kennedy was elected to the House of Representatives in 2016, winning with 55.88% of the vote against Republican opponent Chris Hadsall.

In 2018, Chris Kennedy defeated Republican Joan Poston with 61.75% (17,882) to Poston's 38.25% (11,075 votes).

In 2020, Kennedy defeated Republican Fred Clifford and Libertarian Doug Anderson with 60.2% of the vote. Kennedy was re-elected in 2022 with 66.6% of the vote.

== Legislative career ==
Kennedy sponsored a bill during the 2021 session of the Colorado General Assembly that would authorize the state's municipalities to use ranked-choice voting in city elections even if their charters do not authorize that system of choosing public officials. The bill - HB21-1071 - would also provide for the sharing by county elections offices of electronic voting machines and software necessary to tabulate ranked-choice ballots.

Colorado House of Representatives
Preceded by Adrienne Benavidez	Speaker pro tempore of the Colorado House of Representatives; 2023–2025	Succeeded by Andrew Boesenecker
