= Dusty A. Johnson =

American politician

Member of the Colorado House of Representatives from the 63rd district
- Incumbent
- Assumed office January 8, 2025
- Preceded by: Richard Holtorf

Personal details
- Party: Republican
- Website: www.dustyforcolorado.com

Dusty A. Johnson is an American politician from Fort Morgan, Colorado, U.S. A Republican, Johnson is the representative for Colorado House of Representatives District 63, which includes all or part of the northeastern Colorado counties of Logan, Morgan, Phillips, Sedgwick, Washington, Weld, and Yuma, including the communities of Sterling, Fort Morgan, Brush, Yuma, and Wray.

== Background ==
Johnson is from Fort Morgan in Morgan County, Colorado. Her political experience includes having been employed as a staff assistant and legislative aide for one U.S. congressman and for three Colorado state senators. In addition, she has held several offices within her party, including chairing the Morgan County Republicans. In 2022, the Fort Morgan Times named her a "10 under 40" recipient.

== Elections ==
In the 2024 Republican primary election for Colorado House of Representatives District 63, Johnson defeated opponent Brian Urdiales, winning 66.58% of the votes.

In the general election, Johnson ran unopposed.
