= Mary Bradfield =

American politician

Member of the Colorado House of Representatives from the 21st district
- Incumbent
- Assumed office January 13, 2021
- Preceded by: Lois Landgraf

Personal details
- Party: Republican
- Spouse: Dennis
- Occupation: Retired teacher
- Website: Campaign website

Mary Bradfield is a state representative from Colorado Springs, Colorado. A Republican, Bradfield represents Colorado House of Representatives District 21, which includes portions of El Paso County, including the communities of Fort Carson, Fountain, Rock Creek Park, and Security-Widefield.

== Background ==
Originally from Iowa, Bradfield has lived in Colorado Springs since 1984. She is a retired teacher and is active in her local Republican Party organization.

== Elections ==
=== 2020 ===
Bradfield was first elected to the Colorado House of Representatives in the 2020 general election. In the June 2020 Republican primary, she ran unopposed.

In the 2020 general election, Bradfield defeated her Democratic Party and Libertarian Party opponents, winning 54.20% of the total votes cast.

=== 2022 ===
At the House District 21 Republican assembly held in March 2022, Bradfield failed to garner enough votes to meet the required 30% benchmark to appear on the primary ballot, initially ending her candidacy for re-election. However, Bradford filed a lawsuit contesting the validity of the assembly. A Denver judge threw out the original assembly results and ordered that a second assembly be convened, with a new vote taken. In the second vote, Bradford earned 35% of the vote, securing a spot in the Republican primary. In the contest, she faced first-time candidate and convicted felon Karl Dent. Bradford won the primary, garnering 4,187 votes (65.35% of the total votes cast) to Dent's 2,220 votes (34.65% of the total).

In the 2022 general election, Bradfield defeated her Democratic Party opponent, winning 58.38% of the total votes cast.

=== 2024 ===
Bradfield ran for re-election to the Colorado State House in 2024. In the Republican primary election held June 25, 2024, she defeated opponents Jan Koester and Bill Garlington, winning 47.16% of the votes. In the general election held November 5, 2024, Bradfield defeated Democratic Party candidate Liz Rosenbaum, winning 58.24% of the total votes cast.
