= Lorena Garcia (politician) =

Colorado State Representative

Member of the Colorado House of Representatives from the 35th district
- Incumbent
- Assumed office January 9, 2023
- Preceded by: Adrienne Benavidez

Personal details
- Party: Democratic

Lorena García is an American politician and community organizer from the state of Colorado who has served as a member of the Colorado House of Representatives since January 2023. She was appointed to the House by the Colorado Democratic Party after the previous incumbent Adrienne Benavidez resigned. Benavidez endorsed Garcia as her successor, and a vacancy committee chose to appoint her to the seat. Garcia won 56% of the committee's vote, defeating two other candidates. She previously worked for various nonprofits in Colorado and ran in the Democratic primary for U.S. Senate in 2020, but could not collect enough signatures to make the primary ballot.
