= Chris Richardson (politician) =

American politician

Member of the Colorado House of Representatives from the 56th district
- Incumbent
- Assumed office January 8, 2025
- Preceded by: Rod Bockenfeld

Personal details
- Born: Springfield, Massachusetts
- Party: Republican
- Website: Campaign website

Military service
- Allegiance: United States
- Branch/service: United States Army
- Rank: Colonel

Chris Richardson is an American politician from unincorporated Elbert County, Colorado, U.S. A Republican, Richardson is the representative for Colorado House of Representatives District 56, which encompasses portions of Adams, Arapahoe, Cheyenne, El Paso, Elbert, Kit Carson, and Lincoln counties, including all or parts of the communities of Aurora, Ponderosa Park, Strasburg, Burlington, and Bennett. The district is mostly rural and covers over 1,100 square miles (2,800 square kilometers).

== Background ==
Originally from Springfield, Massachusetts, Richardson was an officer in the United States Army for 23 years, working as a brigade commander and retiring at the rank of colonel. An Operation Desert Storm veteran, he moved to Colorado with his wife and daughter in 2010 just before retiring from the army.

== Elections ==
Richardson served two four-year terms as a county commissioner for Elbert County, representing District 1 from January 2017 to January 2025.

In the 2024 Republican primary election for Colorado House of Representatives District 56, Richardson ran unopposed.

In the general election, Richardson defeated his Democratic Party opponent, winning 75.72% of the total votes cast.
