= Jamie Jackson (politician) =

American politician

Member of the Colorado House of Representatives from the 41st district
- Incumbent
- Assumed office January 27, 2025
- Preceded by: Iman Jodeh

Personal details
- Party: Democratic
- Education: University of Colorado Boulder

Jamie Jackson is an American politician. In January 2025, the Arapahoe County Democratic Party appointed Jackson to the Colorado House of Representatives to replace Iman Jodeh who represented District 41.

Jackson is a community activist. She holds a Bachelor of Arts in Psychology from the University of Colorado Boulder. She was Chief Operating Officer at The Naloxone Project. She also serves as the vice president of the Colorado Black Women for Political Action and the criminal justice chairperson for the Aurora NAACP.

== Career ==
From 2014 to 2021, Jackson worked for the GEO Group which is the countries largest private prison and ICE facility operator, where she oversaw halfway houses. During that time, the GEO Group ran one of two facilities that housed migrant children, lost a lawsuit for requiring detainees into forced labor or face solitary confinement, and flagged by the ACLU for medical neglect of detainees in the Aurora facility. In 2019, during the time that Jackson oversaw prison reentry programs in Colorado the Denver City Council voted to not renew their halfway house contracts with the GEO to make a statement on the company's involvement with immigration prisons. In an Op-Ed in 2026, Jackson stated that she left GEO in 2021, as soon as she realized their practices "conflicted with my values."
