= Rick Taggart =

American politician

J. Merrick Taggart
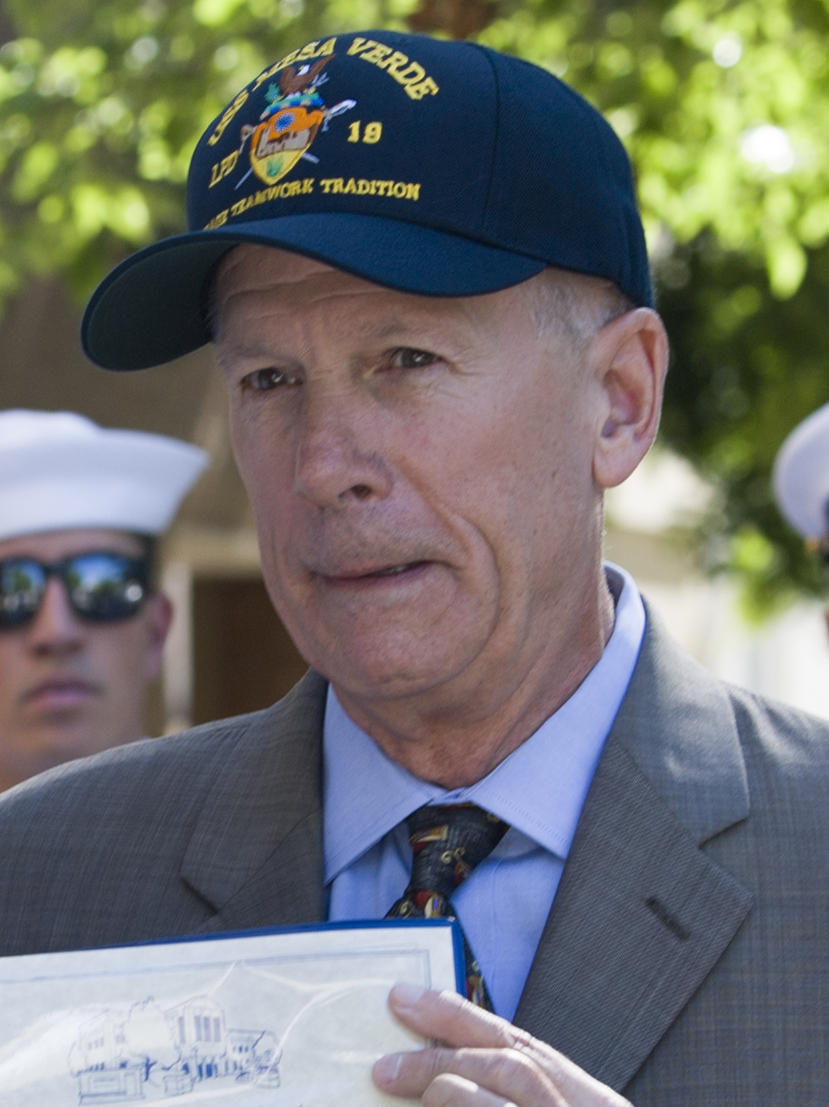

Member of the Colorado House of Representatives from the 55th district
- Incumbent
- Assumed office January 9, 2023
- Preceded by: Janice Rich

Personal details
- Party: Republican
- Spouse: Deanna
- Children: 4
- Education: Syracuse University; University of Phoenix
- Profession: Businessman
- Website: www.rickfor55.com

Rick Taggart is a state representative from Grand Junction, Colorado. A Republican, Taggart represents Colorado House of Representatives District 55, which includes the communities of Grand Junction, Redlands, and Orchard Mesa in Mesa County.

== Background ==
Taggart is a businessman and politician from Grand Junction, Colorado. His corporate experience includes senior positions in Marmot Mountain Works, The Timberland Company, and Swiss Army Brands. He has also worked at Colorado Mesa University in a management position and as a business teacher. He earned a bachelor's degree from Syracuse University and an MBA from the University of Phoenix.

Taggart served from 2015 to 2022 on the Grand Junction City Council. He served as mayor from 2017-2019.

== Elections ==
=== 2022 ===
In the 2022 Colorado House of Representatives election, Taggart defeated his Democratic Party opponent, winning 63.61% of the total votes cast.

=== 2024 ===
Taggart ran for re-election in 2024. In the Republican primary election held June 25, 2024, he ran unopposed. In the general election held November 5, 2024, Taggart also ran unopposed.
