= Brandi Bradley =

American politician

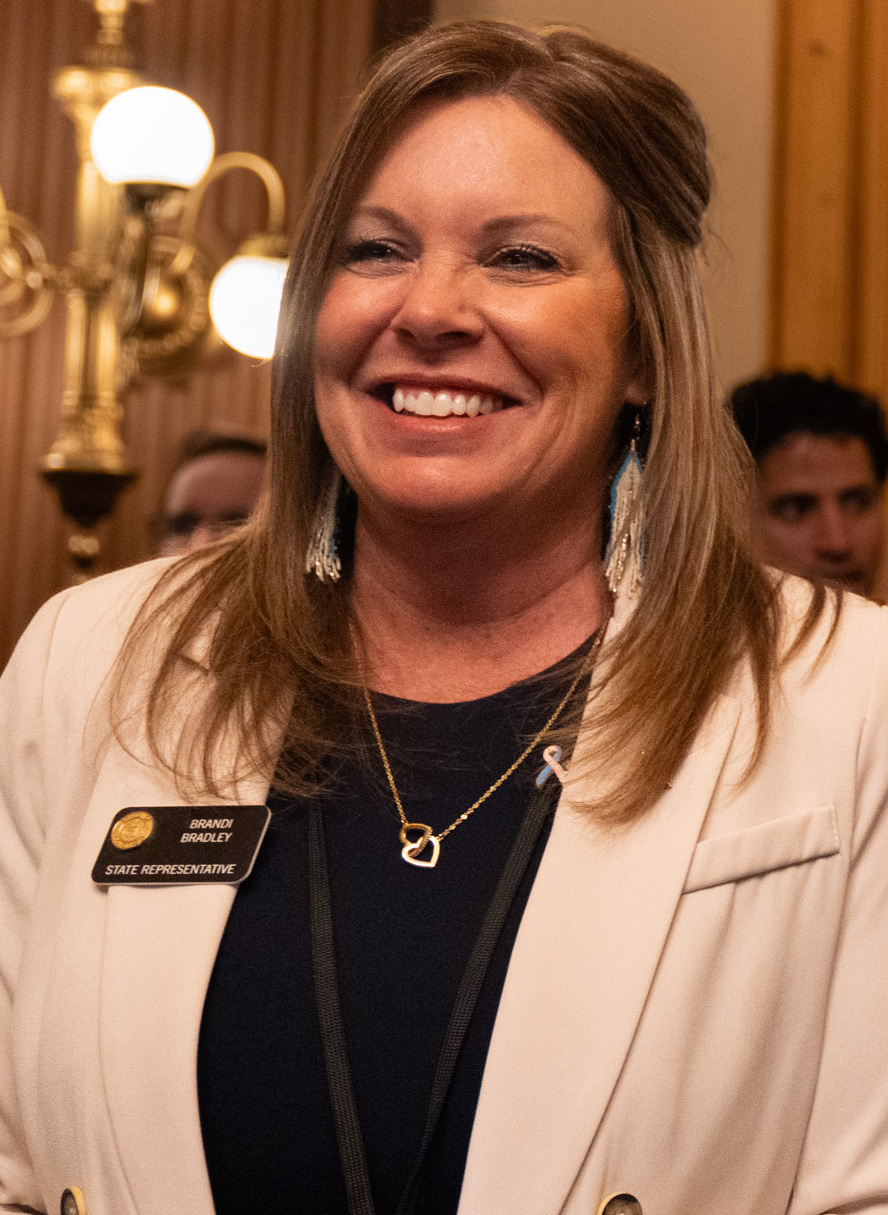
- Bradley in 2024

Member of the Colorado House of Representatives from the 39th district
- Incumbent
- Assumed office January 9, 2023
- Preceded by: Mark Baisley

Personal details
- Born: Nashville, Tennessee, U.S.
- Party: Republican
- Children: 4
- Education: Middle Tennessee State University (BS); Regis University (MS)
- Website: Campaign website

Brandi Bradley is a state representative from Douglas County, Colorado. A Republican, Bradley represents Colorado House of Representatives District 39, which chiefly includes the rural sections of Douglas County but includes part of Highlands Ranch, and all of Lone Tree, Larkspur, Castle Pines, Roxborough Park, and Meridian (excluding Parker and Castle Rock).

== Background ==
Bradley lives in Littleton, Colorado, and works as a physical therapist.

== Elections ==
In the 2022 Colorado House of Representatives election, Bradley defeated her Democratic Party opponent, winning 58.06% of the total votes cast. In January 2025, she expressed support for social media posts calling for the arrest of KUSA journalists Kyle Clark and Chris Vanderveen.

== Bills ==
In the 2025 Regular Session, Bradley introduced the "Youth Health Protection Act", a bill intended to "prohibit... the performance of any medical procedure or medical treatment that furthers a minor's desire to present or appear in a manner that is inconsistent with the minor's sex", including a prohibition of state funds for that purpose.
