= Naquetta Ricks =

American politician

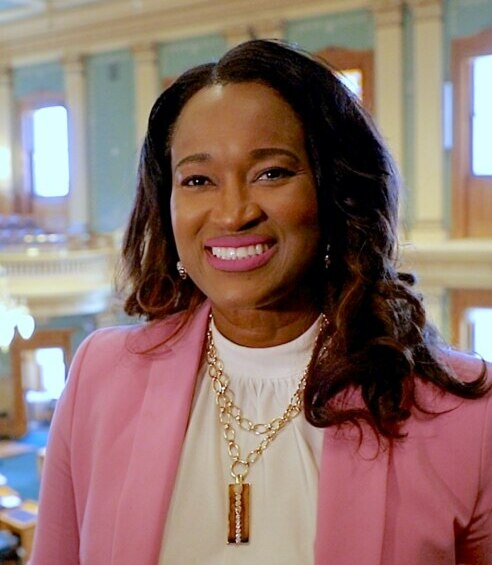
- Ricks in 2021

Member of the Colorado House of Representatives from the 40th district
- Incumbent
- Assumed office January 13, 2021
- Preceded by: Janet Buckner

Personal details
- Born: Liberia
- Party: Democratic
- Education: Metropolitan State University of Denver (BS); University of Colorado Denver (MBA)

Naquetta Ricks is a Liberian-American politician, businesswoman, and accountant serving as a member of the Colorado House of Representatives from the 40th district. Elected in November 2020, she assumed office on January 13, 2021.

== Early life and education ==
Ricks was born in Liberia and moved to the United States with her parents amid the First Liberian Civil War. Ricks' paternal grandfather, John Henry Ricks, had been a state representative in Liberia prior to Naquetta Ricks' birth. Her maternal step-grandfather, General Glakron Gblodell Jackson, was superintendent of Bomi County and was killed after ousted politician Charles Taylor launched a rebellion in late 1989 that brought years of civil war and a quarter-million deaths.

She was raised in Aurora, Colorado, where she graduated from Aurora Central High School. She earned a Bachelor of Science degree in accounting from the Metropolitan State University of Denver and a Master of Business Administration from the University of Colorado Denver.

Rick’s family found a pathway to citizenship in 1986, when then-President Ronald Reagan signed the Immigration Reform and Control Act. The law not only tightened enforcement but also made unauthorized immigrants who had arrived before 1982 eligible for amnesty. Ricks became a U.S. citizen in her early 20s.

== Career ==
Prior to entering politics, Ricks worked as an accountant and operated a mortgage business. In 2017, Ricks unsuccessfully sought a seat on the Aurora City Council, placing third in a field of five candidates. In November 2020, Ricks was elected to the Colorado House of Representatives, defeating Republican nominee Richard Allen Bassett. Ricks is the first Black immigrant elected to Colorado's Statehouse.

During her campaign, Ricks was advised by New American Leaders and Emerge America, non-profit organizations that recruit and train female candidates for office. Upon her election, Ricks became one of the first two Liberian-Americans elected to a state legislature in the United States, along with Nathan Biah of Rhode Island.
