= Tisha Mauro =

American politician

Member of the Colorado House of Representatives from the 46th district
- Incumbent
- Assumed office January 9, 2023
- Preceded by: Daneya Esgar

Personal details
- Party: Democratic
- Education: Colorado State University Pueblo
- Profession: Farmer

Tisha Mauro is an American politician who has served as a member of the Colorado House of Representatives since January 9, 2023. She represents Colorado's 46th House district.

== Electoral history ==
She was elected on November 8, 2022, in the 2022 Colorado House of Representatives election against Republican opponent Jonathan Ambler. She assumed office on January 9, 2023. She was re-elected in 2024.

== Political positions ==
During her tenure, Mauro has focused on local education, water rights for farming, and supporting law enforcement. Mauro describes herself as Pro-choice.

== Biography ==
Outside of politics, Mauro is a chile pepper farmer. She is a graduate of Pueblo County High School and Colorado State University Pueblo.

Colorado House of Representatives
Preceded by Daneya Esgar	Member of the Colorado House of Representatives; 2023–present	Succeeded by incumbent
