= Ryan Gonzalez =

American politician (born 1994)

Member of the Colorado House of Representatives from the 50th district
- Incumbent
- Assumed office January 8, 2025
- Preceded by: Mary Young

Personal details
- Born: December 25, 1994 (age 31) Sylmar, California, U.S.
- Party: Republican
- Education: Aims Community College (AS); University of Northern Colorado (BS)

Ryan Gonzalez (born December 25, 1994) is an American politician who was elected a member of the Colorado House of Representatives for the 50th district in 2024. A member of the Republican Party, he defeated incumbent Democratic candidate Mary Young. He previously ran in the 2022 election and was defeated by Young.
