= Rebekah Stewart =

American politician

Member of the Colorado House of Representatives from the 30th district
- Incumbent
- Assumed office January 8, 2025
- Preceded by: Christopher Louis Kennedy

Personal details
- Party: Democratic
- Education: University of Missouri-Kansas City

Rebekah Stewart is an American politician who was elected member of the Colorado House of Representatives for the 30th district in 2024.

Stewart is the first board-certified music therapist elected to office in Colorado. She was a member of Lakewood City Council.
