= Yara Zokaie =

American tax attorney and politician

Member of the Colorado House of Representatives from the 52nd district
- Incumbent
- Assumed office January 8, 2025
- Preceded by: Cathy Kipp

Personal details
- Born: Cameron Park, California, U.S.
- Party: Democratic
- Other political affiliations: Democratic Socialists of America
- Education: University of California, Davis (BA); University of San Diego (JD, LLM)

Yara Zokaie is an American tax attorney and politician serving as a member of the Colorado House of Representatives for the 52nd district. She assumed office on January 8, 2025.

== Early life and education ==
A native of El Dorado Hills, California, Zokaie is second-generation Iranian-American. She earned a Bachelor of Arts degree from University of California, Davis, followed by a Juris Doctor and LLM in taxation from University of San Diego School of Law.

== Career ==
Outside of politics, Zokaie is a tax attorney, representing clients in cases against the Internal Revenue Service and state departments of revenue. She also co-founded the Latino Coalition, an advocacy organization. Prior to her election, Zokaie served as chief deputy assessor of Larimer County, Colorado. Zokaie was elected to the Colorado House of Representatives in November 2024.
