= Andrew Boesenecker =

American politician

Speaker pro tempore of the Colorado House of Representatives
- Incumbent
- Assumed office January 8, 2025
- Preceded by: Chris Kennedy

Member of the Colorado House of Representatives from the 53rd district
- Incumbent
- Assumed office April 28, 2021
- Preceded by: Jennifer Arndt

Personal details
- Born: Holland, Michigan, U.S.
- Party: Democratic
- Education: Western Michigan University (BM); Iliff School of Theology (MDiv)

Andrew Boesenecker is an American politician, pastor, and former music teacher serving as a member of the Colorado House of Representatives from the 53rd district. Boesenecker assumed office on April 28, 2021, succeeding Jennifer Arndt.

== Early life and education ==
Boesenecker was born in Holland, Michigan. Boesenecker earned a Bachelor of Music from Western Michigan University and a Master of Divinity from the Iliff School of Theology.

== Career ==
From 2001 to 2003, Boesenecker worked as an elementary school music teacher in Daytona Beach, Florida. From 2003 to 2009, he was the director of music for Cross Road Lutheran Church in Fleming Island, Florida. Boesenecker then moved to Fort Collins, Colorado, becoming the founding pastor and director of mission of the Mustard Seed House Churches. Since 2017, Boesenecker has been the director of annual giving and stewardship for the Semester at Sea program.

Boesenecker's political platform included affordable housing, access to behavioral and reproductive care, improvement of recreation sites, education and support for small businesses and workers.

In November 2022, Boesenecker was selected to serve as co-whip of the state House majority for the 2023 legislative session.

In December 2024, House Speaker Julie McCluskie announced that Boesenecker would be the Speaker pro Tem for the 2025 legislative session beginning January 8, 2025.

== Personal life ==
Boesenecker and his wife, Stacey, have three children and live in West Fort Collins, Colorado.

Colorado House of Representatives
Preceded by Chris Kennedy	Speaker pro tempore of the Colorado House of Representatives; 2025–present	Incumbent
