= Brianna Titone =

American politician and scientist

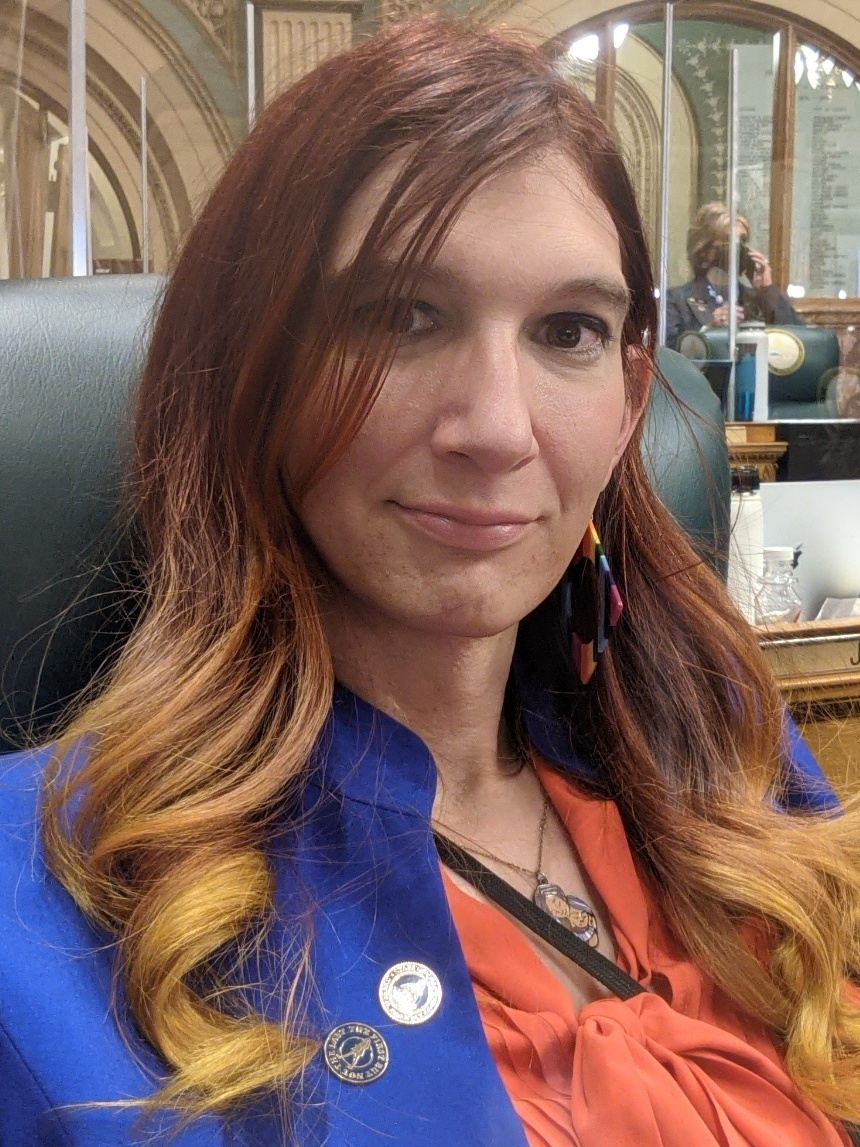

Member of the Colorado House of Representatives from the 27th district
- Incumbent
- Assumed office January 4, 2019
- Preceded by: Lang Sias
- Succeeded by: Danielle Varda (elect)

Personal details
- Born: New York, U.S.
- Party: Democratic
- Education: State University of New York, New Paltz (BS, BA); Stony Brook University (MS); University of Denver (MS)

Brianna Titone (/tɪˈtoʊn/) is an American politician and scientist, currently serving as a member of the Colorado House of Representatives from the 27th district. Titone currently serves in the 75th Colorado General Assembly and is the first openly transgender state legislator elected in Colorado and the 4th elected in the United States. After the 2026 General Assembly, she will complete her limit of 4 terms having served 8 years.

== Early life and career ==
Titone was born and raised in the Hudson Valley region of New York.

Titone earned her bachelor’s degrees in geology and physics from the State University of New York at New Paltz, attending from 1996 to 2002. Titone later earned a master's degree in geochemistry at Stony Brook University, and another master's degree in information and communications technology at the University of Denver. At Stony Brook, Titone’s master's thesis was on the rare-earth element thorium and speciation of fossils and sediments of the Green River Formation. Some of Titone’s research was conducted at Brookhaven National Laboratory using the National Synchrotron Light Source X-26A and X-18B beamlines.

Before entering politics, Titone worked as a mining consultant, geologist, and software developer. For seven years, beginning in high school, Titone was a volunteer firefighter.

== Political career ==
In 2016, Titone joined the Jefferson County, Colorado Democratic LGBT caucus and was elected its Secretary/Treasurer, and later appointed a "captain at large".

Titone declared a run for Colorado House of Representatives HD27 in December 2017. Titone received 50.4% of the vote to win the election with 24,957 votes out of 49,475, a margin of 439. Titone serves on the Health and Insurance Committee, the Rural Affairs and Agriculture Committee, and the Joint Technology Committee, and was also appointed to the Energy Council.

In the 2nd regular session of the 72nd General Assembly, Titone worked to bring back and pass the bill banning the "Gay or Trans Panic Defense". The bill passed on a margin of 98-1-1.

Titone won re-election in the most competitive House race in Colorado, earning 29,566 (48.7%) of 60,708 votes against two opponents in the November 2020 election.

In the 2022 general election, Titone was re-elected with around 57.7% of the votes cast. Later in November, Titone was selected to serve as caucus chair of the state House majority which is a first for a trans lawmaker to serve in an elected leadership position in a General Assembly. She was re-elected in 2024.

On February 26, 2025, Titone announced that she would run for Colorado State Treasurer in 2026, seeking to succeed Dave Young, who is term-limited. If elected, Titone would have been the first transgender person elected to statewide executive office; however, she was eliminated at convention against state senator Jeff Bridges.

== Electoral history ==
=== 2018 ===
Colorado's 27th House district Democratic primary, 2018
Party	Candidate	Votes	%
Democratic	Brianna Titone	9,893	100.0
Total votes		9,893	100.0

Colorado's 27th House district election, 2018
Party	Candidate	Votes	%
Democratic	Brianna Titone	24,957	50.44
Republican	Vicki Pyne	24,518	49.56
Total votes		49,475	100.0
Democratic gain from Republican			

=== 2020 ===
Colorado's 27th House district Democratic primary, 2020
Party	Candidate	Votes	%
Democratic	Brianna Titone (incumbent)	17,469	100.0
Total votes		17,469	100.0

Colorado's 27th House district election, 2020
Party	Candidate	Votes	%
Democratic	Brianna Titone (incumbent)	29,566	48.70
Republican	Vicki Pyne	27,674	45.59
Libertarian	Cory Schaeffer	3,468	5.71
Total votes		60,708	100.0
Democratic hold			

=== 2022 ===
Colorado's 27th House district Democratic primary, 2022
Party	Candidate	Votes	%
Democratic	Brianna Titone (incumbent)	9,586	100.0
Total votes		9.586	100.0

Colorado's 27th House district election, 2022
Party	Candidate	Votes	%
Democratic	Brianna Titone (incumbent)	26,380	57.74
Republican	Lynn Emrick	18,169	39.77
Libertarian	Jacob Luria	1,136	2.49
Total votes		45,685	100.0
Democratic hold			

== Personal life ==
Brianna has several credits in film including nominations and awards. She is the writer, producer, co-director and star of a TV show pilot proof of concept film called "General Assembly". Her most recent award, the Eleanor Roosevelt Creativity Award, was at the 2025 21st Utopia Film Festival for a documentary film created with Colorado State Rep Lorena Garcia called "Not a Token Bill"

Rep. Titone started doing stand-up comedy on March 1, 2025 with the here to pee tour with Ren Quillan at the Junkyard Social in Boulder.

Brianna Titone uses she/her/hers pronouns.

== See also ==
- List of transgender public officeholders in the United States
