= Julie McCluskie =

American politician from Colorado

62nd Speaker of the Colorado House of Representatives
- Incumbent
- Assumed office January 9, 2023
- Preceded by: Alec Garnett

Member of the Colorado House of Representatives
- Incumbent
- Assumed office January 4, 2019
- Preceded by: Millie Hamner
- Constituency: 61st district (2019–2023); 13th district (2023–present)

Personal details
- Born: January 12, 1964 (age 62) Dillon, Colorado, U.S.
- Party: Democratic
- Education: Colorado State University (BS)

Julie Lynn McCluskie (born January 12, 1964) is an American politician who is the 62nd Speaker of the Colorado House of Representatives since 2023. A Democrat, she represents the 13th district, which includes the counties of Chaffee, Grand, Jackson, Lake, Park and Summit, including the communities of Salida, Breckenridge, Silverthorne, Frisco and Buena Vista. Prior to 2023, she represented the 61st district, which included the counties of Lake, Pitkin, Delta, Summit, and Gunnison.

== Background ==
McCluskie was born and raised in Dillon, Colorado. She earned a Bachelor of Science degree in chemistry and biochemistry from Colorado State University. McCluskie served as the director of human resources for Xanterra Travel Collection in Aurora, Colorado. She later served as the director of communications for Lieutenant Governor Joseph Garcia before working as the Communications Coordinator for Summit School District and as the Regional Development Officer for Colorado Mountain College.

McCluskie was elected in the general election on November 6, 2018, winning 63 percent of the vote over 37 percent of Republican candidate Mike Mason. In her first term, McCluskie was appointed to the House Education Committee, House Appropriations Committee, and the Agriculture, Livestock, and Water Committee. In January 2020, McCluskie was appointed to the Joint Budget Committee.

McCluskie was re-elected for a second term in the general election on November 3, 2020, winning 60 percent of the vote over 40 percent of Republican candidate Kim McGahey. McCluskie was again appointed to the Joint Budget Committee immediately following her re-election. In the 2022 Colorado House elections, McCluskie was re-elected with around 60% of the votes cast. On November 11, 2022, McCluskie was chosen as the new Speaker of the Colorado House of Representatives. Of the selection, McCluskie said "My heart is still full with how honored I am by this recognition from my colleagues, it is a tremendous opportunity and responsibility."

Political offices
Preceded by Alec Garnett	Speaker of the Colorado House of Representatives; 2023–present	Incumbent
