= Colorado House of Representatives =

Lower house of the state legislature of Colorado, US

Coordinates: 39.7392°N 104.9848°W

- 75th Colorado General Assembly

Type
- Type: Lower house
- Term limits: 4 terms (8 years)

History
- New session started: January 8, 2025

Leadership
- Speaker: Julie McCluskie (D) since January 9, 2023
- Speaker pro tempore: Andrew Boesenecker (D) since January 8, 2025
- Majority Leader: Monica Duran (D) since January 9, 2023
- Minority Leader: Jarvis Caldwell (R) since September 20, 2025

Structure
- Seats: 65
- Political groups: Majority: Democratic (43); Minority: Republican (22)
- Length of term: 2 years
- Authority: Article V, Colorado Constitution
- Salary: $43,977/year + per diem

Elections
- Voting system: First-past-the-post
- Last election: November 5, 2024
- Next election: November 3, 2026
- Redistricting: Colorado Independent Legislative Redistricting Commission

Meeting place
- House of Representatives Chamber; Colorado State Capitol, Denver; United States of America

Website
- Colorado General Assembly

Rules
- Colorado Legislative Rules

The Colorado House of Representatives is the lower house of the Colorado General Assembly, the state legislature of the U.S. state of Colorado. The House is composed of 65 members from an equal number of constituent districts, with each district having roughly 80,000 people. Representatives are elected to two-year terms, and are limited to four consecutive terms in office, but can run again after a four-year respite.

The Colorado House of Representatives convenes at the State Capitol in Denver.

== Committees ==
The House has 11 current committees of reference:

- House Agriculture, Livestock, and Water Committee
- House Appropriations Committee
- House Business Affairs and Labor
- House Education
- House Energy and Environment Committee
- House Finance Committee
- House Health and Insurance Committee
- House Judiciary Committee
- House Public and Behavioral Health and Human Services Committee
- House State, Civic, Military, and Veterans Affairs Committee
- House Transportation and Local Government Committee Committee

== Current composition ==
↓
43	22
Democratic	Republican

Affiliation	Party (Shading indicates majority caucus)		Total	Vacant
Affiliation	Democratic	Republican	Total	Vacant
68th General Assembly	32	33	65	0
69th General Assembly	37	28	65	0
70th General Assembly	34	31	65	0
Begin 71st Assembly	37	28	65	0
March 2, 2018 (Note: Steve Lebsock changed his party affiliation from Democratic to Republican.)	36	29	65	0
72nd General Assembly	41	24	65	0
73rd General Assembly	41	24	65	0
74th General Assembly	46	19	65	0
Begin 75th Assembly	43	22	65	0
Latest voting share	66.2%	33.8%		

== Leaders ==
Position	Name	Party	Residence	District
Speaker of the House	Julie McCluskie	Democratic	Dillon	13
Speaker Pro Tempore	Andrew Boesenecker	Democratic	Fort Collins	53
Majority Leader	Monica Duran	Democratic	Wheat Ridge	23
Assistant Majority Leader	Jennifer Bacon	Democratic	Denver	7
Majority Caucus Co-chair	Mandy Lindsay	Democratic	Aurora	42
Majority Caucus Co-Chair	Junie Joseph	Democratic	Boulder	10
Majority Co-Whip	Matthew Martinez	Democratic	Alamosa	62
Majority Co-Whip	Elizabeth Velasco	Democratic	Glenwood Springs	57
Minority Leader	Jarvis Caldwell	Republican	Colorado Springs	20
Assistant Minority Leader	Ty Winter	Republican	Trinidad	47
Minority Caucus Chair	Anthony Hartsook	Republican	Parker	44
Minority Whip	Carlos Barron	Republican	Fort Lupton	48

== Members ==
District	Name	Party	Residence	Start	Term Limited
1	Javier Mabrey	Democratic	Denver	2022	No
2	Steven Woodrow	Democratic	Denver	2020 (Note: Originally appointed.)	No
3	Meg Froelich	Democratic	Greenwood Village	2019	No
4	Cecelia Espenoza	Democratic	Denver	2024	No
5	Alex Valdez	Democratic	Denver	2018	Yes
6	Sean Camacho	Democratic	Denver	2024	No
7	Jennifer Bacon	Democratic	Denver	2020	No
8	Lindsay Gilchrist	Democratic	Denver	2024	No
9	Emily Sirota	Democratic	Denver	2018	Yes
10	Junie Joseph	Democratic	Boulder	2022	No
11	Karen McCormick	Democratic	Hygiene	2020	No
12	Kyle Brown	Democratic	Louisville	2023	No
13	Julie McCluskie	Democratic	Boulder	2018	Yes
14	Ava Flanell	Republican	Colorado Springs	2025	No
15	Scott Bottoms	Republican	Colorado Springs	2022	No
16	Rebecca Keltie	Republican	Colorado Springs	2024	No
17	Regina English	Democratic	Colorado Springs	2022	No
18	Amy Paschal	Democratic	Colorado Springs	2024	No
19	Dan Woog (Note: Woog previously served in the state house from 2021–2023.)	Republican	Frederick	2024	No
20	Jarvis Caldwell	Republican	Colorado Springs	2024	No
21	Mary Bradfield	Republican	Colorado Springs	2020	No
22	Ken DeGraaf	Republican	Colorado Springs	2022	No
23	Monica Duran	Democratic	Wheat Ridge	2018	Yes
24	Lisa Feret	Democratic	Arvada	2024	No
25	Tammy Story	Democratic	Evergreen	2018	Yes
26	Meghan Lukens	Democratic	Steamboat Springs	2022	No
27	Brianna Titone	Democratic	Golden	2018	Yes
28	Sheila Lieder	Democratic	Littleton	2022	No
29	Lori Goldstein	Democratic	Westminster	2026	No
30	Rebekah Stewart	Democratic	Lakewood	2024	No
31	Jacqueline Phillips	Democratic	Thornton	2024	No
32	María González	Democratic	Commerce City	2026	No
33	Kenny Nguyen	Democratic	Broomfield	2026	No
34	Jenny Willford	Democratic	Northglenn	2022	No
35	Lorena Garcia	Democratic	Westminster	2023	No
36	Michael Carter	Democratic	Aurora	2024	No
37	Chad Clifford	Democratic	Centennial	2024	No
38	Gretchen Rydin	Democratic	Littleton	2024	No
39	Brandi Bradley	Republican	Larkspur	2022	No
40	Naquetta Ricks	Democratic	Aurora	2020	No
41	Jamie Jackson	Democratic	Aurora	2025	No
42	Mandy Lindsay	Democratic	Aurora	2022	No
43	Bob Marshall	Democratic	Highlands Ranch	2022	No
44	Anthony Hartsook	Republican	Parker	2022	No
45	Max Brooks	Republican	Castle Rock	2024	No
46	Tisha Mauro	Democratic	Pueblo	2022	No
47	Ty Winter	Republican	Trinidad	2022	No
48	Carlos Barron	Republican	Fort Lupton	2024	No
49	Lesley Smith	Democratic	Boulder	2024	No
50	Ryan Gonzalez	Republican	Greeley	2024	No
51	Ron Weinberg	Republican	Loveland	2023	No
52	Yara Zokaie	Democratic	Windsor	2024	No
53	Andrew Boesenecker	Democratic	Fort Collins	2021	No
54	Matt Soper	Republican	Delta	2018	Yes
55	Rick Taggart	Republican	Grand Junction	2022	No
56	Chris Richardson	Republican	Elbert County	2024	No
57	Elizabeth Velasco	Democratic	Glenwood Springs	2022	No
58	Larry Don Suckla	Republican	Montezuma County	2024	No
59	Katie Stewart	Democratic	Durango	2024	No
60	Stephanie Luck	Republican	Penrose	2020	No
61	Eliza Hamrick	Democratic	Centennial	2022	No
62	Matthew Martinez	Democratic	Alamosa	2022	No
63	Dusty A. Johnson	Republican	Fort Morgan	2024	No
64	Scott Slaugh	Republican	Berthoud	2025	No
65	Lori Garcia Sander	Republican	Eaton	2024	No

== Women who served in the House of Representatives ==
The first women who served in the Colorado House of Representatives were Clara Cressingham, Carrie Holly and Frances Klock. All three were elected to serve in 1895-1896. Carrie Holly introduced and passed a Bill that raised the age of consent for girls from 16 to 18 and another that gave mothers the same rights to their children as fathers.

A total of 10 women served in the period up to 1904, the last of them being Alice Ruble. In 1906, party leaders declared that "no woman will ever again be elected to the [Colorado] legislature". Their prediction proved wrong, as demonstrated by the list of subsequent women members of the House - the first of whom was Alma Lafferty, who first served in 1908.

== See also ==
- Outline of Colorado
- Index of Colorado-related articles
- State of Colorado
  - Government of Colorado
    - List of governors of Colorado
      - List of lieutenant governors of Colorado
    - Colorado General Assembly
      - Colorado Senate
      - Colorado House of Representatives
        - List of speakers of the Colorado House of Representatives
      - List of Colorado state legislatures
    - Courts of Colorado
      - Colorado Supreme Court
- Federal government
  - United States Congress
    - Colorado's congressional delegations
      - List of United States senators from Colorado
      - List of United States representatives from Colorado
        - Colorado's congressional districts
