= Tom Plant (politician) =

American politician

Member of the Colorado House of Representatives from the 13th district
- In office January 6, 1999 – January 10, 2007
- Preceded by: Mark Udall
- Succeeded by: Claire Levy

Personal details
- Party: Democratic
- Education: Colorado State University
- Profession: Politician

Tom Plant is an American politician who served four terms as a member of the Colorado House of Representatives, representing the 13th district in northcentral Colorado. A Democrat, he served in the state house from 1999 to 2007. In 2023, Plant was appointed by the Governor of Colorado and affirmed by the Colorado State Senate to serve as one of three members of the Colorado Public Utilities Commission. His term ends in 2027.

== Career ==
Plant served in the Colorado House of Representatives from 1999 to 2007. Following his statehouse service, Plant served as director of the Governor's Energy Office (now the Colorado Energy Office) from 2007 to 2011 under Governor Bill Ritter. In 2011, he followed Ritter to the Center for the New Energy Economy at Colorado State University, working as a senior policy advisor there until his appointment to the PUC was confirmed in early 2023.

== Education ==
Plant earned an undergraduate degree from Colorado State University.

== Elections ==
Plant was first elected to the Colorado House of Representatives in 1998 and then re-elected in 2000, 2002, and 2004. He represented the 13th district, which at the time covered Jackson, Grand, Clear Creek and Gilpin counties, plus a portion of western Boulder County.

== Political affiliation ==
Plant was a Democrat during his eight years in the statehouse. Plant changed his registration in 2017 to Unaffiliated. Plant was appointed to the Colorado PUC in 2023. Colorado law states that a maximum of two of the three PUC commissioners can be from the same party.
