= Justine Sandoval =

American politician

Member-elect of the Colorado House of Representatives from the 5th district
- Assuming office January 2027
- Succeeding: Alex Valdez

Personal details
- Party: Democratic

Justine Sandoval is an American politician. A member of the Democratic Party, she is the member-elect for the 5th district of the Colorado House of Representatives.
