= 2028 United States House of Representatives elections in Colorado =

- November 7, 2028

All 8 Colorado seats to the United States House of Representatives
Party	Democratic	Republican
Last election	7	1

The 2028 United States House of Representatives elections in Colorado will be held on November 7, 2028, to elect the eight U.S. representatives from the State of Colorado, one from each of the state's congressional districts. The elections will coincide with other elections to the House of Representatives, elections to the United States Senate, and various state and local elections.

== District 1 ==
The 1st district includes almost all of Denver, as well as the enclaves of Glendale and Holly Hills. The incumbent is Democrat Melat Kiros, who was elected with 78.4% of the vote in 2026.

=== Democratic primary ===
==== Formed exploratory committee ====
- Crisanta Duran, speaker of the Colorado House of Representatives (2017–2019) from HD-5 (2011–2019) and candidate for this district in 2020

==== Potential ====
- Melat Kiros, incumbent U.S. representative

== District 2 ==
The 2nd district is located in north-central Colorado, including the northwestern Denver suburbs, such as Boulder and Fort Collins. The incumbent is Democrat Joe Neguse, who was re-elected with 74.7% of the vote in 2026.

=== Democratic primary ===
==== Potential ====
- Joe Neguse, incumbent U.S. representative

== District 3 ==
The 3rd district encompasses the Colorado Western Slope, including the cities of Montrose, Pueblo, and Grand Junction. The incumbent is Republican Jeff Hurd, who was re-elected with 49.2% of the vote in 2026.

=== Republican primary ===
==== Potential ====
- Jeff Hurd, incumbent U.S. representative

== District 4 ==
The 4th district encompasses the rural Eastern Plains and the southern Denver exurbs, including Castle Rock and Parker. The incumbent is Democrat Eileen Laubacher, who flipped the district and was elected to the 4th district with 48.8% of the vote in 2026.

=== Democratic primary ===
==== Filed Paperwork ====
- Eileen Laubacher, incumbent U.S. representative

=== Republican primary ===
==== Declared ====
- Gabe Evans, former U.S. representative from Colorado's 8th congressional district (2025-2027)

==== Filed paperwork ====
- Jeremy Peterson

==== Declined ====
- Lauren Boebert, former U.S. representative from Colorado's 4th congressional district (2021-2027)

== District 5 ==
The 5th district is centered on El Paso County and Colorado Springs including its suburbs, Cimarron Hills and Fort Carson. The incumbent is Democrat Jessica Killin, who flipped the district and was elected with 50.7% of the vote in 2026.

=== Democratic primary ===
==== Potential ====
- Jessica Killin, incumbent U.S. representative

== District 6 ==
The 6th district takes in much of the eastern Denver metropolitan area, as well as parts of the southern and northern area. The incumbent is Democrat Jason Crow, who was re-elected with 65.7% of the vote in 2026.

=== Democratic primary ===
==== Potential ====
- Jason Crow, incumbent U.S. representative

== District 7 ==
The 7th district encompasses central Colorado, with a small part extending into the western Denver metropolitan area. The incumbent is Democrat Brittany Pettersen, who was re-elected with 60.7% of the vote in 2026.

=== Democratic primary ===
==== Potential ====
- Brittany Pettersen, incumbent U.S. Representative

== District 8 ==
The 8th district includes the northern Front Range cities and surrounding Denver communities, including Thornton, Brighton, Johnstown, and Greeley. The incumbent is Democrat Manny Rutinel, who flipped the district and was elected with 55.5% of the vote in 2026.

=== Democratic primary ===
==== Potential ====
- Manny Rutinel, incumbent U.S. representative
