= Joel Judd =

American attorney and politician from Colorado

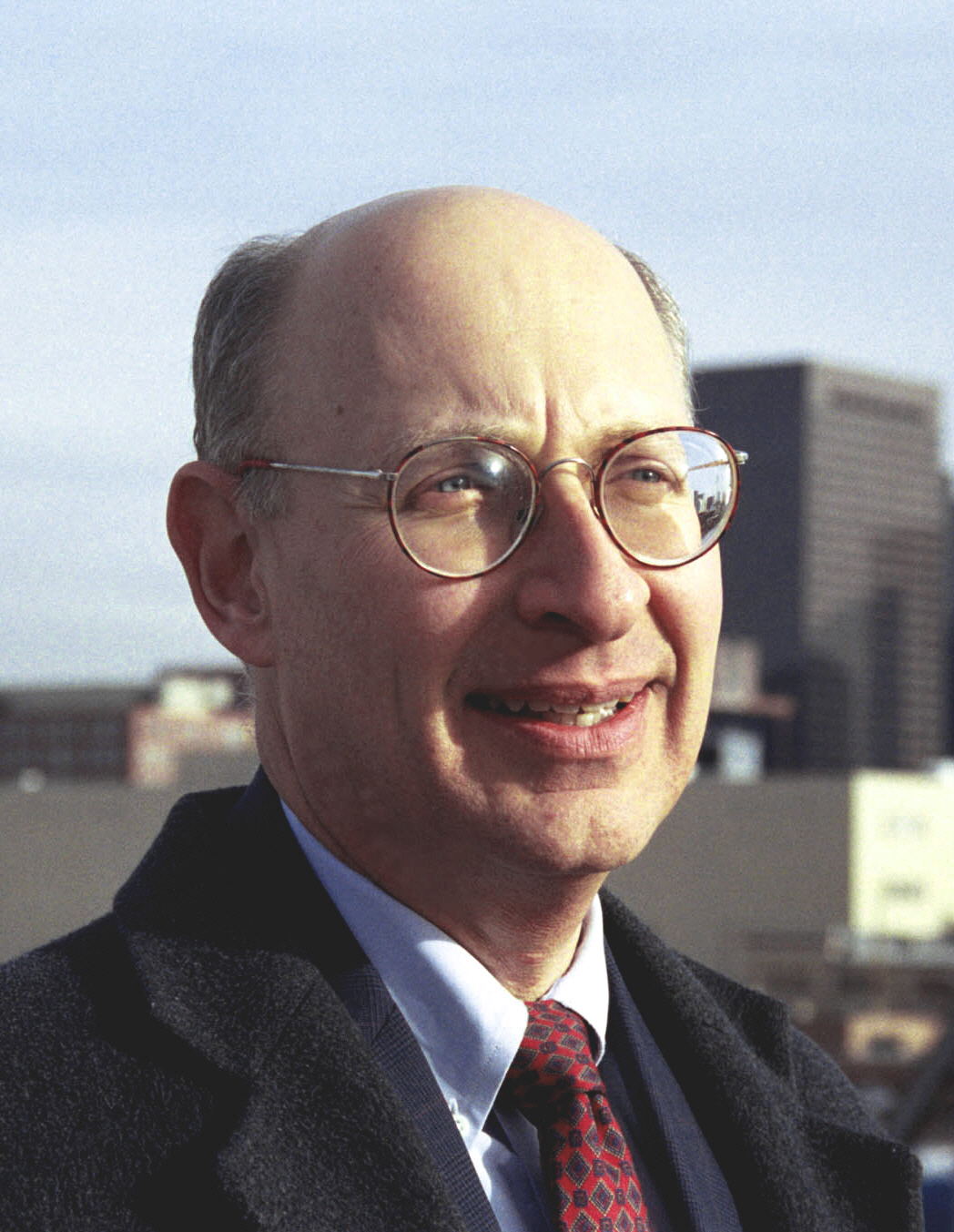

Member of the Colorado House of Representatives from the 5th district
- In office January 8, 2003 – January 11, 2011
- Succeeded by: Crisanta Duran

Personal details
- Born: September 10, 1951 (age 74) Denver, Colorado
- Party: Democratic
- Occupation: Attorney, politician

Joel Stanton Judd (born September 10, 1951) is an American lawyer and former politician from Denver, Colorado. Elected to the Colorado House of Representatives as a Democrat in 2002, Judd represented House District 5, which encompasses downtown Denver, until 2010.

== Biography ==
Born in Denver, Colorado, Judd earned a bachelor's degree from New College of Florida in 1972 and then returned to Colorado, earning a J.D. degree from the University of Denver in 1976. He then entered private practice, working at Feder & Morris from 1976 to 1977, at Reckseen and Lau from 1977 to 1982, and finally opening an individual law practice in 1982.

As a community member, Judd has served as President of the Downtown Denver Optimists Club from 1980 to 1983, and as a board member of Denver's Jewish Community Center, from 1985 to 1988. Also an active outdoorsman, Judd maintains a list of his favorite hikes on his campaign web site; he was also president of the Denver Mosaic Outdoor Mountain Club from 1994 to 1997, and served on Mosaic Outdoor Clubs of America's national board of directors from 1998 to 1999.

== Legislative career ==
Judd was first elected to the Colorado House of Representatives in 2002, defeating Republican Brandi Moreland and Reform Party candidate Christopher Wilson with over 70 percent of votes cast. Judd was re-elected in 2004, 2006 and 2008.

During his first term, Judd sat on the House Information and Technology Committee and the House Judiciary Committee. In his second term, Judd moved to the House Appropriations Committee and to the House Finance Committee where, under Democratic control of the legislature, he was named Vice-Chairman. Currently in his third term, Judd remains on the House Appropriations Committee and chairs the House Finance Committee.

Term limits prevented Judd from seeking a fifth House term in 2010. Instead, he ran for the Colorado Senate in the 34th district but lost in the Democratic primary to Lucía Guzmán, the incumbent who had been appointed to the seat months earlier.

=== Sponsored legislation ===
Each of his first five years in the legislature Judd introduced a child support casino intercept bill. It lost each year. In 2007 he passed it by adding the proposal as an amendment to another child support bill. Colorado children have now collected over a million dollars from delinquent parents with large casino winnings.

In 2006, Judd sponsored a measure to allow pregnant teenagers to seek medical treatment without parental consent; the bill passed the legislature and was enacted into law, albeit without the signature of Gov. Bill Owens.

During the 2007 legislative session, in reaction to a 2006 hit and run accident that killed a mother and her two young children in downtown Denver, Judd sponsored legislation to strengthen penalties for drunk driving and require ignition interlock devices on the automobiles of those convicted of DUIs. The measure would have made Colorado's drunk-driving laws the strictest in the nation, but was defeated in the legislature. Another 2007 measure by Judd, designed to limit handguns with vehicles unless the owner held a concealed carry permit, was opposed by gun-rights advocates and the National Rifle Association of America, and was defeated in committee.

One of Judd's successful 2007 bills was a measure to increases penalties for employers who willfully withhold pay from employees, written and pushed through the legislature with the help of students from the University of Denver's law clinic.

In the 2008 session, Judd has introduced legislation to require ignition interlocks for drivers convicted of driving while intoxicated, and to limit campaign contributions from limited liability corporations.
