= Judy Amabile =

American politician and businesswoman

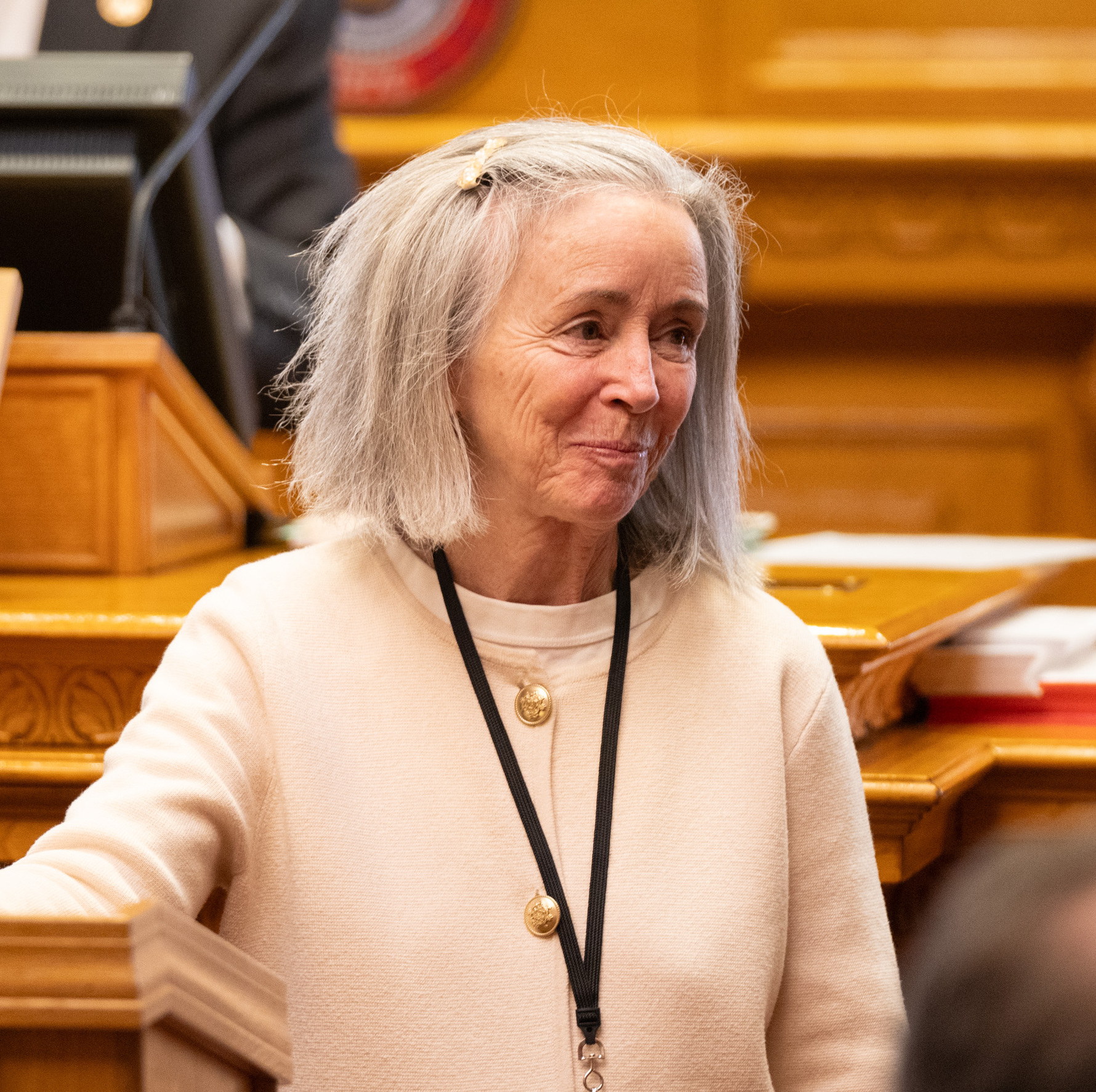

Member of the Colorado Senate from the 18th district
- Incumbent
- Assumed office January 8, 2025
- Preceded by: Steve Fenberg

Member of the Colorado House of Representatives
- In office January 13, 2021 – January 8, 2025
- Preceded by: KC Becker
- Succeeded by: Lesley Smith

Personal details
- Born: Judith Amabile
- Party: Democratic
- Children: 3
- Education: University of Colorado Boulder (BA, MBA)

Judith "Judy" Amabile is an American politician and businesswoman who is currently serving as the Colorado State Senator from District 18. Previously she served as a member of the Colorado House of Representatives from the 49th district and, prior to 2023, the 13th district.

== Education ==
Amabile earned a Bachelor of Arts degree and Master of Business Administration from the University of Colorado Boulder.

== Career ==
Prior to entering politics, Amabile worked as a consultant for Coopers and Lybrand. She also co-founded Product Architects, Inc. and Good Business Colorado. Amabile was elected to the Colorado House of Representatives in November 2020, succeeding former Speaker KC Becker.

== Personal life ==
Amabile and her husband, Robert Heiberger, had three sons before divorcing. Amabile and her husband have remained business partners after their divorce.
