= Alec Garnett =

American politician from Colorado

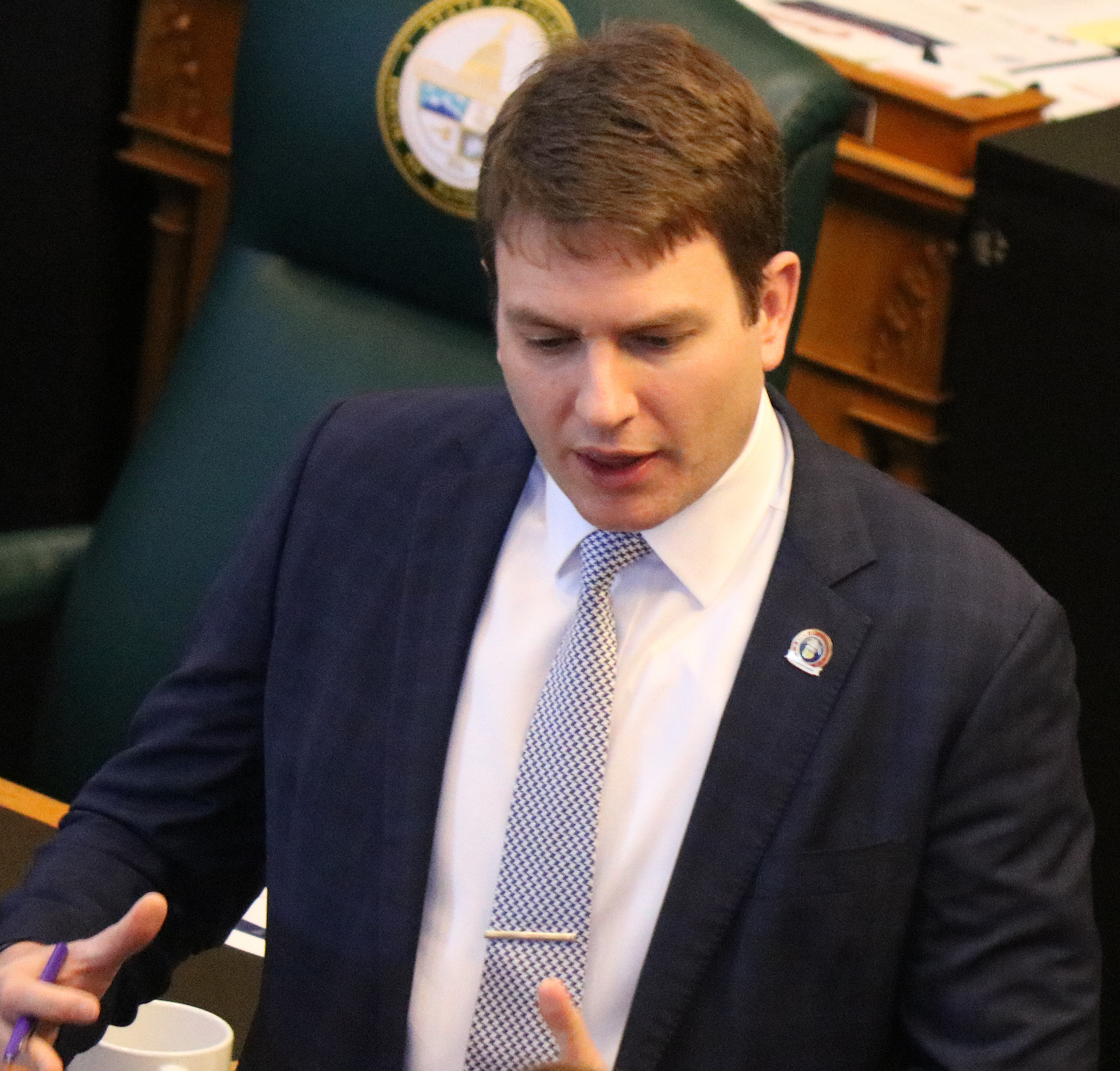

61st Speaker of the Colorado House of Representatives
- In office January 13, 2021 – January 9, 2023
- Preceded by: KC Becker
- Succeeded by: Julie McCluskie

Majority Leader of the Colorado House of Representatives
- In office January 4, 2019 – January 13, 2021
- Preceded by: KC Becker
- Succeeded by: Daneya Esgar

Member of the Colorado House of Representatives from the 2nd district
- In office January 7, 2015 – January 9, 2023
- Preceded by: Mark Ferrandino
- Succeeded by: Steven Woodrow (redistricting)

Personal details
- Party: Democratic
- Education: College of Wooster (BA); University of Colorado, Denver (MPA)

Alec Garnett is an American politician and a former Democratic member of the Colorado House of Representatives and the former Speaker of the House. He represented District 2, which covered a portion of the city of Denver. He was first elected in 2014 to replace retiring House Speaker Mark Ferrandino. In November 2020, Garnett's colleagues elected him to serve as speaker of the Colorado House of Representatives for the two-year term beginning in January 2021. From January 2023 to September 2024, he served as Governor Jared Polis' chief of staff.

== Career ==
Prior to taking office, Garnett was the executive director of the Colorado Democratic Party. He previously worked as a legislative assistant to U.S. Representative Ed Perlmutter and legislative director to U.S. Representative John Adler. In 2010 Garnett managed the political campaign of his father, who ran for Colorado attorney general that year.

Garnett was elected to his seat in 2014 with 72.6% of the vote against Republican Party opponent Jon Roberts. He was reelected in 2016 with 73.28% of the vote against Republican opponent Paul Linton. He was unopposed in 2018 and, in 2020, Garnett was reelected with 80.6% of the vote against Republican Victoria Partridge.

Garnett served on the House Appropriations Committee, the House Business Affairs and Labor Committee, and the House Education Committee. After becoming a member of House leadership he served on the General Assembly's executive committee and Legislative Council committee.

Garnett was elected speaker of the Colorado House of Representatives on November 5, 2020.

After leaving the Colorado General Assembly on January 1, 2023, Garnett became Gov. Jared Polis' chief of staff. He resigned the position on September 13, 2024.

== Personal life ==
Garnett's father, Stan, is the former district attorney for Boulder County, Colorado.

Garnett is married to Emily Renwick Garnett. They have three children and live in Denver, Colorado. Emily is an attorney at Brownstein.

Colorado House of Representatives
Preceded by KC Becker	Majority Leader of the Colorado House of Representatives; 2019–2021	Succeeded by Daneya Esgar
Political offices
Preceded by KC Becker	Speaker of the Colorado House of Representatives; 2021–2023	Succeeded by Julie McCluskie
