= Monica Duran =

American politician (born 1960)

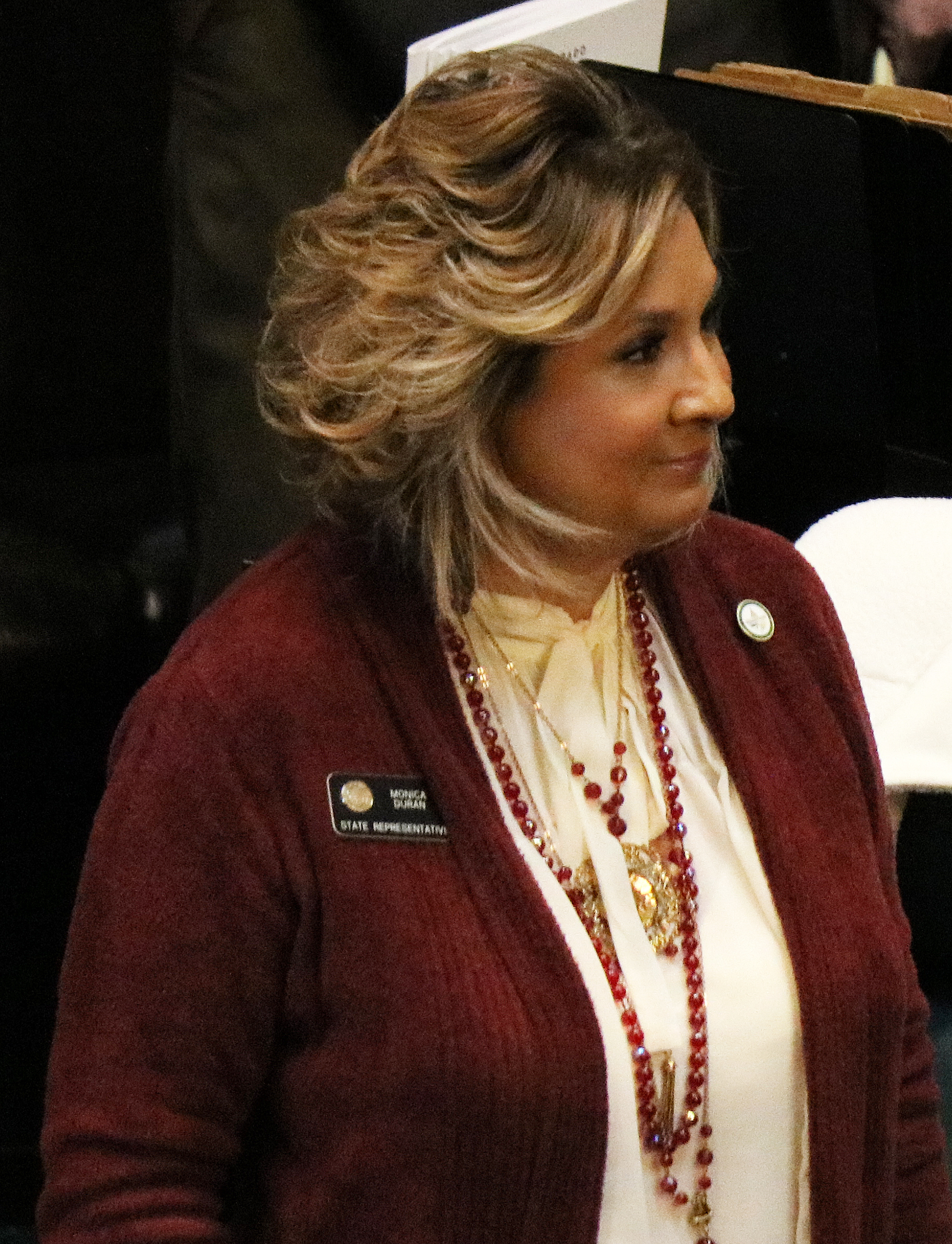

Majority Leader of the Colorado House of Representatives
- Incumbent
- Assumed office January 9, 2023
- Preceded by: Daneya Esgar
- Succeeded by: to be announced

Member of the Colorado House of Representatives from the 23rd district
- Incumbent
- Assumed office January 9, 2023
- Preceded by: Redistricted
- Succeeded by: Alexis Hoffkling (elect)

Member of the Colorado House of Representatives from the 24th district
- In office January 4, 2019 – January 9, 2023
- Preceded by: Jessie Danielson
- Succeeded by: Redistricted

Personal details
- Born: January 8, 1960 (age 66)
- Party: Democratic

Monica Irasema Duran (born January 8, 1960) is an American politician who is a member of the Colorado House of Representatives representing the 23rd district, which includes the communities of Lakewood, Wheat Ridge, Applewood, Mountain View, and East Pleasant View, in Jefferson County. Prior to reapportionment, Duran represented the 24th district in Jefferson County.

== Biography ==
Before getting involved in politics, Duran worked in the dental industry for more than 30 years.

== Political career ==
Duran was elected in the general election on November 6, 2018, winning 63 percent of the vote over 37 percent of Republican candidate Arthur Erwin. She was previously a member of the City Council for Wheat Ridge, Colorado. She was re-elected in 2020.

From 2020 to 2022, Duran served as majority co-whip for the House. She is a member of the Colorado Democratic Latino Caucus, the Children's Caucus, and the Colorado Legislative Animal Welfare Caucus. Duran also co-chairs the General Assembly's Democratic Women's Caucus.

During her tenure, Duran has sponsored bills that included creating minimum standards of care for animal shelters and rescues, creating an office to improve work on missing or murder cases involving indigenous people and a bill aimed at protecting domestic abuse victims by preventing abusers from possessing firearms.

In November 2022, Duran was selected to become the majority leader of the Colorado House of Representatives for the 2023 legislative session. She was re-elected in 2024.

Colorado House of Representatives
Preceded by Daneya Esgar	Majority Leader of the Colorado House of Representatives; 2023–present	Incumbent
