= Colorado's 23rd House of Representatives district =

American legislative district

Colorado's 23rd State House of Representatives district
Representative
Monica Duran; D–Wheat Ridge
- Demographics: 75% White; 2% Black; 17% Hispanic; 2% Asian; 1% Native American; 4% Multiracial
- Population (2024): 86,901

Colorado's 23rd House of Representatives district is one of 65 districts in the Colorado House of Representatives. It has been represented by Monica Duran since 2022.

== Members ==
- Monica Duran
- Alexis Hoffkling
