= Daneya Esgar =

American politician

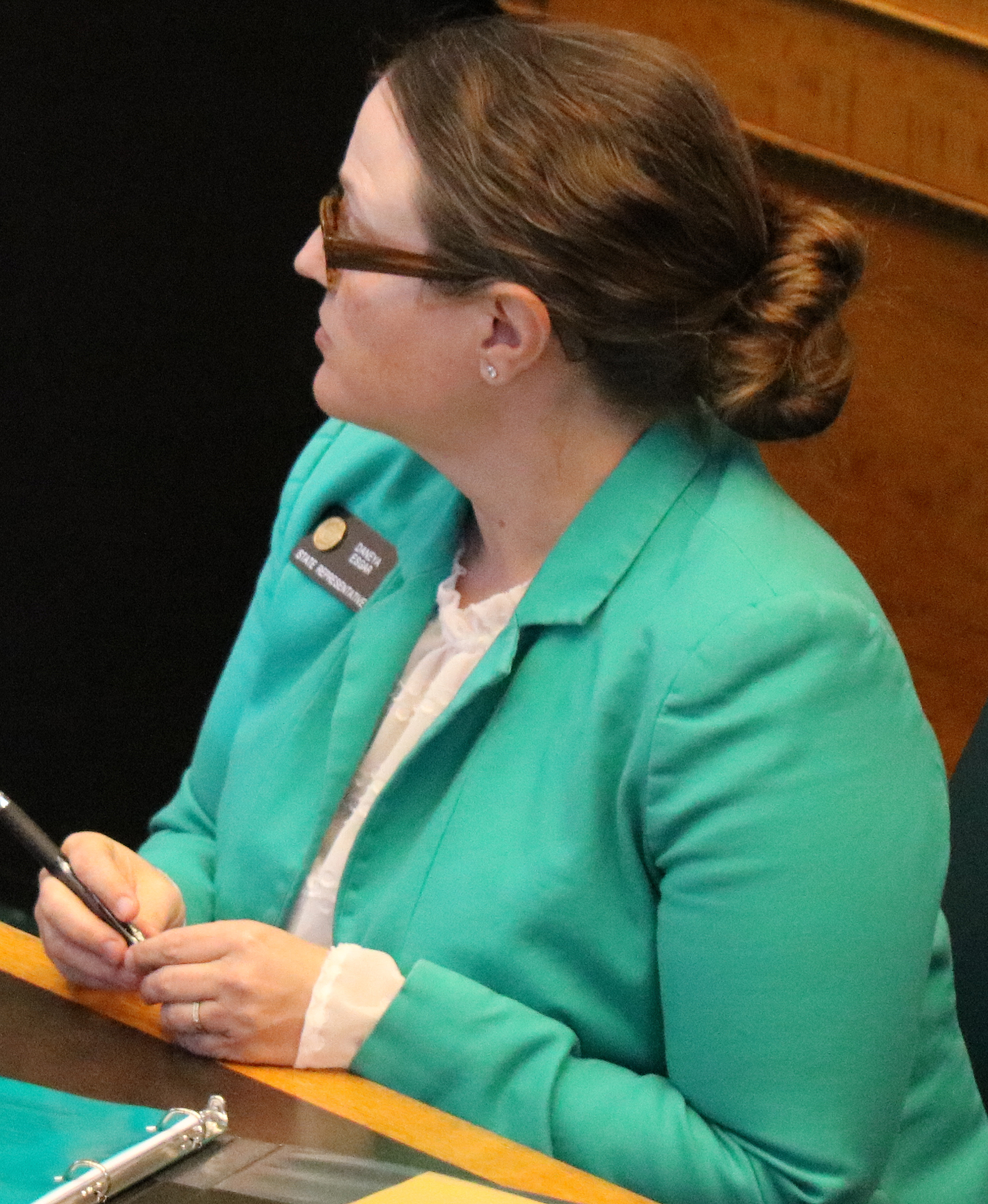

Member of the Pueblo County Commission from the 2nd district
- In office June 1, 2023 – January 14, 2025
- Preceded by: Garrison Ortiz
- Succeeded by: Paula McPheeters

Majority Leader of the Colorado House of Representatives
- In office January 13, 2021 – January 9, 2023
- Preceded by: Alec Garnett
- Succeeded by: Monica Duran

Member of the Colorado House of Representatives from the 46th district
- In office January 7, 2015 – January 9, 2023
- Preceded by: Leroy Garcia
- Succeeded by: Tisha Mauro

Personal details
- Born: 1979 (age 46–47)
- Party: Democratic
- Education: Colorado State University, Pueblo (BS)

Daneya Leigh Esgar is a politician who served as a county commissioner in Pueblo County, Colorado. Also, prior to her tenure on the county commission, she was a Democratic member of the Colorado House of Representatives. She represented District 46, which covered a portion of Pueblo County. She was first elected to her statehouse seat in 2014, succeeding Leroy Garcia. Term limited, she left office in January 2023.

Esgar is a lifelong Pueblo resident and an alumna of Colorado State University Pueblo. Before taking office, she worked as a journalist and community organizer. She is openly lesbian and was a member of the Colorado House's LGBT Caucus.

Esgar previously served as the House Majority Caucus Chair. She was also the chair of the Capital Development Committee, the vice chair of the House Health, Insurance, & Environment Committee, and a member of the House Agriculture, Livestock, and Natural Resources Committee and the House Transportation & Energy Committee. Additionally, she served as temporary Speaker of the House during the January 9th, 2023 Speaker election for the 74th General Assembly, making her the first openly gay representative to hold the Speaker's gavel in the state.

Esgar was the first openly gay state legislator to represent the Pueblo community in the General Assembly.

== Political career ==
=== Colorado House of Representatives ===
Esgar was first elected to the House of Representatives in 2014, winning with 52.2% of the vote against Republican opponent Brian Mater. She was reelected in 2016, in which she ran unopposed.

In November 2020, Esgar's colleagues elected her to serve as majority leader of the Colorado House of Representatives for the two-year term beginning in January 2021.

=== Pueblo County Commission ===
On June 1, 2023, Esgar was sworn in as Pueblo County Commissioner, 2nd District, following the resignation of former Commissioner Garrison Ortiz. A Democratic party vacancy committee appointed her to fill the position on May 12, 2023. Her term ended in January 2025.

In 2024, Esgar ran for election to the office. In the Democratic primary election held June 25, 2024, she ran unopposed. In the general election held November 5, 2024, Esgar was defeated by Republican candidate Paula McPheeters.

Colorado House of Representatives
Preceded by Alec Garnett	Majority Leader of the Colorado House of Representatives; 2021–2023	Succeeded by Monica Duran
