= Lesley Smith (politician) =

American politician

Member of the Colorado House of Representatives from the 49th district
- Incumbent
- Assumed office January 8, 2025
- Preceded by: Judy Amabile

Personal details
- Born: Los Angeles, California
- Party: Democratic
- Education: University of California at Santa Barbara; University of Maryland
- Website: https://www.lesleyforco.com/

Lesley Smith is an American politician who was elected member of the Colorado House of Representatives for the 49th district in 2024. The district includes portions of Larimer, Boulder, Gilpin and Clear Creek County.

Smith is a retired environmental scientist with a 30-year career at the University of Colorado Boulder. She served one six-year term (from 2019 to 2025) as an at-large member of the University of Colorado Board of Regents. Then, instead of seeking a second term on the board, she decided to run for a seat in the Colorado House of Representatives. She is also a former Boulder Valley School District board member.

== Personal life ==
Smith and her husband live in Boulder, Colorado, where they raised their two children.
