= Alex Valdez =

American politician

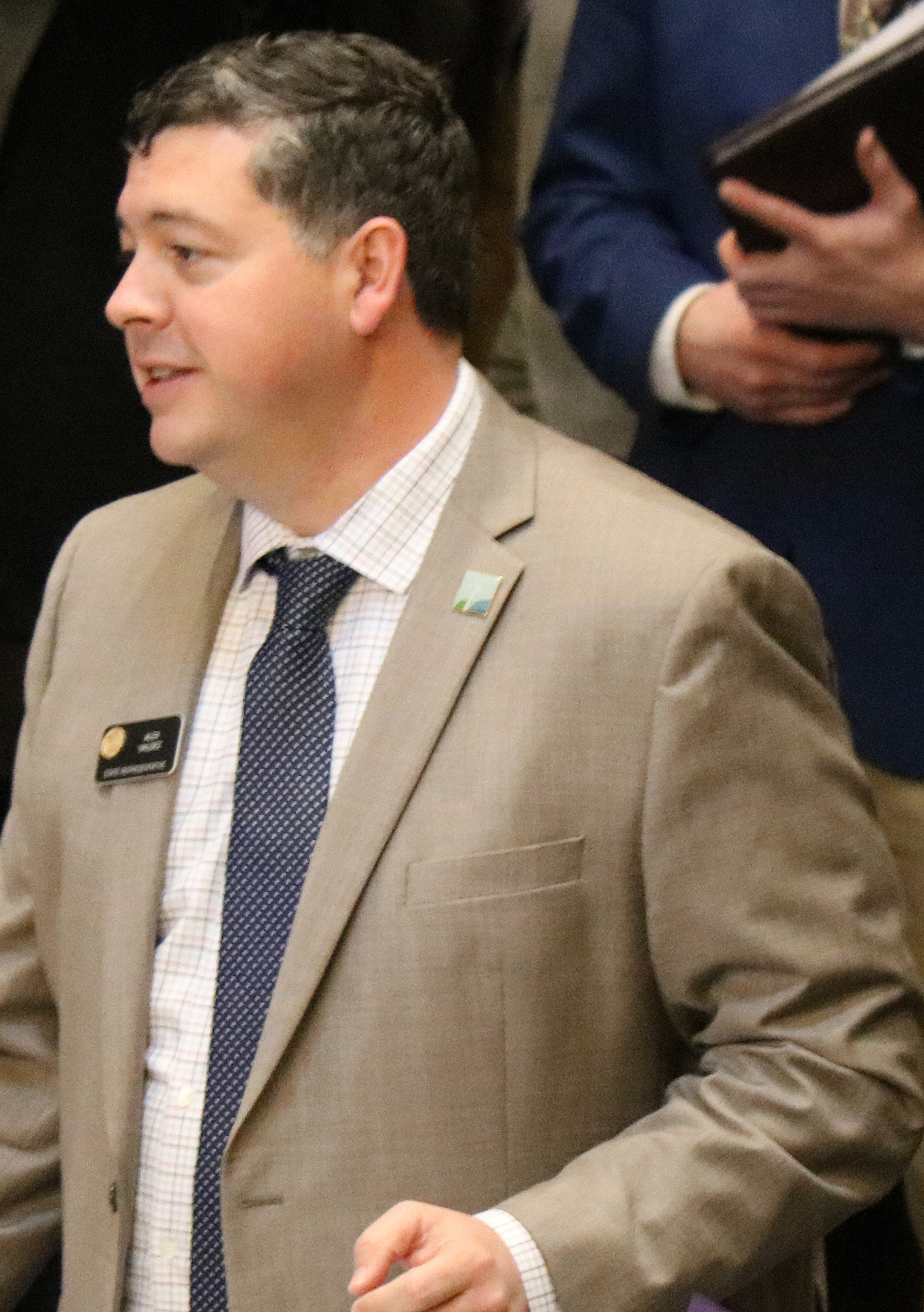
- Valdez in 2020

Member of the Colorado House of Representatives from the 5th district
- Incumbent
- Assumed office January 4, 2019
- Preceded by: Crisanta Duran
- Succeeded by: Justine Sandoval (elect)

Personal details
- Born: June 3, 1981 (age 45)
- Party: Democratic

Alex Valdez is an American politician who is the member of the Colorado House of Representatives. Since 2019, he has represented the 5th House District, which includes Denver.

== Political career ==
Valdez was elected in the general election on November 6, 2018, having received 79% of the vote over 19% of the vote to Republican candidate Katherine Whitney.

Valdez was the first ever first-year legislator appointed to a leadership in the Colorado House of Representatives and soon after was named the Chair of the Energy and Environment Committee, Chair of the LGBTQ Caucus, and Chair of the Latino Caucus. Valdez also services on the State, Civic, Military, and Veterans Affairs Committee and recently founded the General Aviation Caucus.

Valdez had a short run for Mayor of Denver which lasted from November 2022 to Jan of 2023.

== List of Bills that Alex Valdez passed and was a prime sponsor of during his time in the Colorado General Assembly ==
=== 2019 Regular Session ===
- SB19-200: Alcohol Beverage Consumption National Western Center - This bill concerns an exception to the prohibition on removing an alcohol beverage from a premises licensed to serve alcohol beverages at the national western center.
- SB19-145: Sunset Continue Dialysis Clinic And Technician Regulation - This bill concerns the continuation of the regulation of dialysis care by the department of public health and environment.
- SB19-063: Infant And Family Child Care Action Plan - This bill concerns a strategic action plan to address infant and family child care home shortages in Colorado.
- HB19-1260: Building Energy Codes - This bill concerns an update to the minimum energy code for the construction of buildings.
- HB19-1234: Regulated Marijuana Delivery - This bill concerns allowing delivery of regulated marijuana by regulated marijuana sellers, and makes an appropriation.
- HB19-1221: Regulation Of Electric Scooters - This bill concerns the regulation of electric scooters.
- HB19-1198: Electric Vehicle Grant Fund - This bill concerns the powers and duties of the electric vehicle grant fund.
- HB19-1189: Wage Garnishment Reform - This bill concerns wage garnishment reform, reducing disposable earnings by health insurance premiums, reducing the amount subject to garnishment, and providing more detailed information to the judgment debtor regarding garnishment.
- HB19-1092: Animal Ban For Cruelty To Animals Conviction - This bill concerns a prohibition on future ownership of an animal for persons convicted of animal cruelty.
- HB19-1003: Community Solar Gardens Modernization Act - This bill concerns community solar gardens.

=== 2020 Regular Session ===
- SB20-219: Lease-purchase Issuance For Capital Construction - This bill concerns the issuance of a lease-purchase agreement to fund the continuation of certain previously funded capital construction projects.
- SB20-039: Update Accessibility Signage State-owned Facility - This bill concerns updated accessibility signage in a state-owned facility.
- HB20-1265: Increase Public Protection Air Toxics Emissions - This bill concerns increased public protections from emissions of air toxics.
- HB20-1215: Sunset Water Wastewater Facility Operators Certification Board - This bill concerns the continuation of the water and wastewater facility operators certification board, implementing recommendations from the 2019 sunset report by the department of regulatory agencies, and making an appropriation.
- HB20-1155: Higher Efficiency New Construction Residence - This bill concerns requirements that builders of new residences offer buyers options to accommodate higher efficiency devices.
- HB20-1082: State Historical Society Authority To Sell Property - This bill concerns the authority of the state historical society to dispose of real property in Georgetown, Colorado.
- HB20-1061: Human Immunodeficiency Virus Infection Prevention Medications - This bill concerns pharmacists' ability to provide HIV infection prevention medications to patients, and makes an appropriation.
- HB20B-1004: Qualified Retailer Retain Sales Tax For Assistance - This bill concerns a temporary deduction from state net taxable sales for certain retailers to retain collected sales tax as assistance for lost revenue due to economic disruptions from COVID-19.

=== 2021 Regular Session ===
- SB21-288: American Rescue Plan Act of 2021 Cash Fund - This bill concerns the creation of the "American Rescue Plan Act of 2021" cash fund to hold money received by the state from the federal coronavirus state fiscal recovery fund until allocated by separate action.
- SB21-270: Increase Alcohol Beverages On-premises Production - This bill concerns an increase in the alcohol beverage production limits for a retail establishment licensed to produce alcohol beverages on its premises.
- SB21-264: Adopt Programs Reduce Greenhouse Gas Emissions Utilities - This bill concerns the adoption of programs by gas utilities to reduce greenhouse gas emissions, and makes an appropriation.
- SB21-261: Public Utilities Commission Encourage Renewable Energy Generation - This bill concerns measures to increase the deployment of renewable energy generation facilities to meet Colorado's energy needs, raising allowable capacity of customer-sited facilities, providing additional options for increasing scale and flexibility of new installations, and making an appropriation.
- SB21-246: Electric Utility Promote Beneficial Electrification - This bill concerns measures to encourage beneficial electrification, and directs the public utilities commission and Colorado utilities to promote compliance with current environmental and labor standards, and makes an appropriation.
- SB21-230: Transfer To Colorado Energy Office Energy Fund - This bill concerns a transfer of money from the general fund to the energy fund to finance programs of the Colorado energy office.
- SB21-076: Fund Electronic Third-party Vehicle Transactions - This bill concerns the funding of a system for electronic transactions made by third-party providers related to vehicle regulation, and makes an appropriation.
- SB21-072: Public Utilities Commission Modernize Electric Transmission Infrastructure - This bill concerns the expansion of electric transmission facilities to meet clean energy goals, creating the Colorado electric transmission authority, requiring transmission utilities to join organized wholesale markets, and allowing additional classes of transmission utilities to obtain revenue through broadband facilities colocation.
- SB21-069: License Plate Expiration On Change Of Ownership - This bill concerns license plates, specifying that license plates of Class C personal property vehicles expire upon sale or transfer, authorizing issuance of previously retired styles, and making an appropriation.
- SB21-020: Energy Equipment And Facility Property Tax Valuation - This bill concerns the valuation of property related to renewable energy for property tax purposes.
- HB21-1286: Energy Performance For Buildings - This bill concerns measures to improve energy efficiency, requiring owners of large buildings to collect and report on energy-use benchmarking data, comply with energy and greenhouse gas emission performance standards, and modifying statutory requirements for energy performance contracts.
- HB21-1284: Limit Fee Install Active Solar Energy System - This bill concerns modifications to the limitation on aggregate fees assessed by governmental bodies for active solar energy system installation, and extends the repeal date of the limitation.
- HB21-1222: Regulation Of Family Child Care Homes - This bill concerns aligning local governing authority regulations to expand opportunities to access child care in family child care homes.
- HB21-1216: Marijuana Licensees Ability To Change Designation - This bill concerns the ability for certain marijuana licensees to change the designation of marijuana from retail to medical.
- HB21-1206: Medicaid Transportation Services - This bill concerns the protection of critical services through the creation of sustainable medicaid transportation safety requirements, and makes and reduces an appropriation.
- HB21-1189: Regulate Air Toxics - This bill concerns additional public health protections in relation to the emission of air toxics, and makes an appropriation.
- HB21-1162: Management Of Plastic Products - This bill concerns the management of plastic products.
- HB21-1141: Electric Vehicle License Plate - This bill concerns the creation of a license plate for plug-in electric motor vehicles, and makes an appropriation.
- HB21-1090: Criminal Marijuana Offenses - This bill concerns certain criminal marijuana offenses.
- HB21-1048: Retail Business Must Accept Cash - This bill concerns a requirement that retail establishments accept United States currency for purchases.

=== 2022 Regular Session ===
- SB22-228: Retail Establishments Accept Cash Enforcement - This bill concerns the requirement that retail establishments accept United States currency.
- SB22-213: Child Care Support Programs - This bill concerns continuing support for necessary child care programs, and makes an appropriation.
- SB22-211: Repurpose The Ridge View Campus - This bill concerns the repurposing of the Ridge View campus into a supportive residential community for people experiencing homelessness, and makes an appropriation.
- SB22-205: Intoxicating Hemp And Tetrahydrocannabinol Products - This bill concerns the regulation of cannabis-related products that may potentially cause intoxication when used.
- SB22-193: Air Quality Improvement Investments - This bill concerns measures to improve air quality in the state, and makes an appropriation.
- SB22-178: Licensees Ability To Change Marijuana Designation - This bill concerns the ability for certain marijuana licensees to change the designation of marijuana from medical to retail, and makes an appropriation.
- SB22-145: Resources To Increase Community Safety - This bill concerns measures to provide resources to increase community safety, and makes an appropriation.
- HB22-1388: Vehicle Registration And Certificate Of Title - This bill concerns the regulation of vehicles related to their ownership, and makes an appropriation.
- HB22-1362: Building Greenhouse Gas Emissions - This bill concerns the reduction of building greenhouse gas emissions, requiring the Colorado energy office director and department of local affairs executive director to appoint an energy code board, requiring local governments and state agencies to adopt consistent codes, creating the building electrification for public buildings grant program, creating the high-efficiency electric heating and appliances grant program, and establishing the clean air building investments fund.
- HB22-1322: Water Quality Regulation - This bill concerns the clarification of the water quality control commission's authority, and extends the statute of limitations for violations under the "Colorado Water Quality Control Act".
- HB22-1267: Culturally Relevant Training Health Professionals - This bill concerns culturally relevant training available to health-care providers, and makes an appropriation.
- HB22-1254: Vehicle Taxes And Fees Late Registration - This bill concerns regulation related to the ownership of a vehicle, and makes an appropriation.
- HB22-1232: Sunset Continue Regulation Of Asbestos - This bill concerns the continuation of the regulation of persons in connection with asbestos control, and implements recommendations from the 2021 sunset report by the department of regulatory agencies.
- HB22-1114: Transportation Services For Medicaid Waiver Recipients - This bill concerns authorizing a transportation network company to provide nonmedical transportation services to persons enrolled in certain medicaid waiver programs, and makes an appropriation.

=== 2023 Regular Session ===
- SB23-306: Buildings In The Capitol Complex - This bill concerns state capital assets, determining office space for the legislative department in the capitol complex, specifying additional funding sources and modifying funding timing for state-owned buildings, and making an appropriation.
- SB23-277: Public Safety Programs Extended Uses - This bill concerns measures to provide resources to increase public safety, and extend related existing appropriations.
- HB23-1285: Store Use Of Carryout Bags And Sustainable Products - This bill concerns the requirement that a store use fees collected from single-use bags to purchase certain items for the store.
- HB23-1260: Advanced Industry and Semiconductor Manufacturing Incentives - This bill concerns tax incentives to maximize investments in semiconductor and advanced manufacturing in Colorado, authorizing refund certificates for income tax credits, creating a semiconductor manufacturing zone program, modifying tax credits for semiconductor and advanced manufacturing, creating an advanced industries task force, and making an appropriation.
- HB23-1233: Electric Vehicle Charging And Parking Requirements - This bill concerns energy efficiency by requiring the state electrical board to adopt rules for EV charging at multifamily buildings, limiting prohibitions on EV charging, requiring local governments to count EV-served spaces for parking requirements, forbidding local government prohibitions on EV charging station installation, exempting EV chargers from business personal property tax, and authorizing EV charging systems along highway rights-of-way.
- HB23-1137: Solar Garden Net Metering Credits Stabilization - This bill concerns measures to stabilize net metering credits calculated for an electric retail utility's purchase of electric output from a community solar garden.
- HB23-1068: Pet Animal Ownership In Housing - This bill concerns pet animal ownership in housing, prohibiting dog breed restrictions for homeowner's insurance, providing for pet animal handling during writ of restitution execution, limiting security deposits and rent for pets, and excluding pets from personal property liens.

=== 2024 Regular Session ===
- SB24-207: Access to Distributed Generation - This bill concerns access to distributed energy, establishing requirements for inclusive community solar capacity that investor-owned electric utilities must make available, requiring the acquisition of distributed generation facilities paired with energy storage, and making an appropriation.
- HB24-1378: Consumer Protection in Event Ticket Sales - This bill concerns consumer protection in event ticket sales.
- HB24-1325: Tax Credits for Quantum Industry Support - This bill concerns the creation of tax incentives to support the quantum industry, and makes an appropriation.
- HB24-1173: Electric Vehicle Charging System Permits - This bill concerns streamlining the process for permitting electric motor vehicle charging systems.

=== 2025 Regular Session ===
- SB25-052: Railroad Investigative Report Confidentiality - This bill focuses on the confidentiality of information related to the regulation of railroad operations.
- HB25-1290: Transit Worker Assault & Funding for Training - This bill is about transit worker safety.
- HB25-1269: Building Decarbonization Measures - This bill concerns building decarbonization measures, and, in connection therewith, creates a building decarbonization enterprise and makes an appropriation.
- HB25-1208: Local Governments Tip Offsets for Tipped Employees - This bill concerns increasing the amount of the tip offset associated with a local government's minimum wage, and requires a local government that enacts a local minimum wage exceeding the state minimum wage to satisfy certain requirements in determining the tip offset.
- HB25-1167: Alternative Education Campuses - This bill concerns alternative education campuses and makes an appropriation.
- HB25-1161: Labeling Gas-Fueled Stoves - This bill concerns requiring the labeling of gas-fueled stoves.
- HB25-1040: Adding Nuclear Energy as a Clean Energy Resource - This bill concerns the inclusion of nuclear energy as a source of clean energy.
- HB25-1007: Paratransit Services - This bill concerns emergency preparedness for paratransit services.

== Background ==
Valdez grew up in Aurora, Colorado, and attended Rangeview High School. After graduating from Rangeview in 1999, Valdez attended Embry–Riddle Aeronautical University, Daytona Beach. Valdez then transferred to the University of Colorado Boulder and graduated with a history degree in 2004.

Prior to serving in the Colorado House of Representatives, Valdez founded his own company, EcoMark Solar in 2008. During the Great Recession, EcoMark grew into one of Colorado's largest solar companies. In 2022, Ecomark Solar went out of business after struggling to adjust to economic challenges to the solar industry during the COVID-19 pandemic. Ecomark's closure also lead to complaints from customers who paid for systems that were never installed and one employee who claimed they were not paid for outstanding commissions owed.

== Personal life ==
He is openly pansexual.
