= Colorado Public Utilities Commission =

American state utility regulator

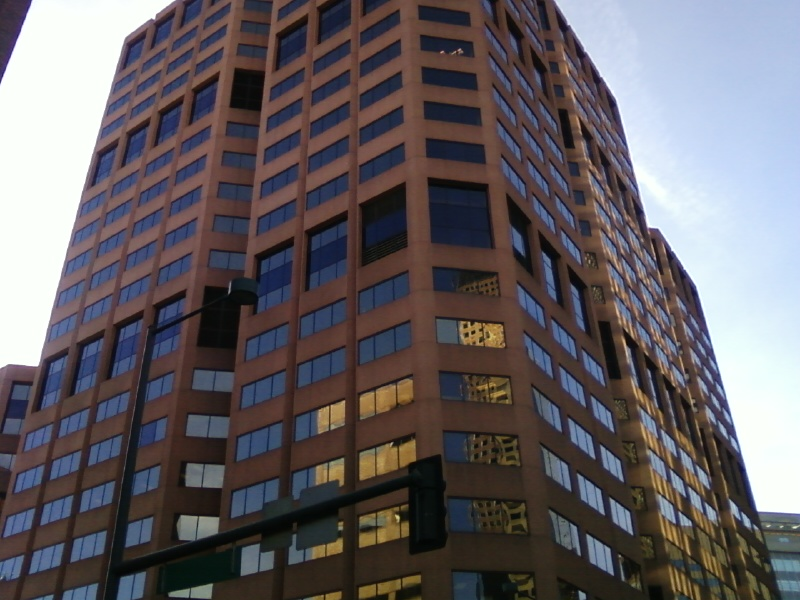
- One Civic Center Plaza

Commission overview
- Jurisdiction: Colorado
- Headquarters: One Civic Center Plaza; 1560 Broadway, Suite 250 Denver, Colorado
- Commission executives: Eric Blank, Chairman of the Colorado Public Utilities Commission; Rebecca White, Director of the Colorado Public Utilities Commission
- Website: www.colorado.gov/dora/puc/

The Public Utilities Commission of the State of Colorado (PUC) provides regulatory oversight of public utilities in the State of Colorado of the United States.

The Colorado PUC consists of a director and three commissioners appointed by the Governor of Colorado and confirmed by the Colorado State Senate. The director is Rebecca White and the incumbent commissioners are:

- Eric Blank, Chairman, 2021–2025 and 2025–2029
- Megan Gilman, Commissioner, 2020–2024 and 2024–2028
- Tom Plant, Commissioner, 2023-2027

Fixed utilities regulated by the Colorado PUC include electric power utilities, natural gas utilities, intrastate natural gas pipelines, district heating utilities, drinking water utilities, and telecommunications utilities.

Transportation utilities regulated by the Colorado PUC include railroads, taxis, limousines, shuttles, charters, and sightseeing carriers.

The Public Utilities Commission is an independent constitutional commission which operates within the Colorado Department of Regulatory Agencies (DORA).

== See also ==
- Government of Colorado
- Public utilities commission
- Public utility
