= Claire Levy =

American politician

Boulder County Commissioner
- Incumbent
- Assumed office 2021

Member of the Colorado House of Representatives from the 13th district
- In office January 10, 2007 – October 31, 2013
- Preceded by: Tom Plant
- Succeeded by: KC Becker

Personal details
- Born: July 3, 1956 (age 70) Bloomington, Indiana
- Party: Democratic
- Children: Mara; Ellie
- Education: Case Western Reserve University; Carleton College
- Profession: Attorney

Claire Levy (born July 3, 1956) is a former legislator in the U.S. state of Colorado. Elected to the Colorado House of Representatives as a Democrat in 2006, Levy represented House District 13, which encompasses Clear Creek, Gilpin, and western Boulder counties. Levy was named the Executive Director of the Colorado Center on Law and Policy on November 1, 2013. The Colorado Center on Law and Policy is a Denver-based nonprofit organization working to advance the health, economic security and well-being of low-income Coloradans through research, education, advocacy and litigation.

== Early career ==
Raised in Indiana, Levy earned a bachelor's degree from Carleton College in Minnesota in 1978, and then a J.D. from Case Western Reserve University, 1982.

Moving to Denver in 1982, Levy worked as a deputy public defender in the Colorado State Public Defender's Office from 1983 to 1986, representing indigents accused of felonies. After moving to Boulder in 1986, Levy briefly worked in private practice with Buchan, Gray, Purvis, and Scheutze. In 1989, she took a job in the Jefferson County Attorney's office focusing on land use and planning issues. Since 1999, Levy has worked in private practice in Boulder.

Levy has served as a precinct captain for the Boulder County Democratic Party, on the boards of PLAN Boulder County (where she has also been vice-chair and chair), the Boulder Arts Academy, and the Boulder Ballet, and as a member of the Boulder County Parks and Open Space Advisory Committee (including three years as its chair), the Boulder County Housing Authority, and the City of Boulder Planning Board. Levy has two daughters, Mara and Ellie.

Levy has served as a Boulder County Commissioner since 2020 and was re-elected in 2024.

== Legislative career ==
=== 2006 campaign ===
Claire Levy faced Jim Rettew, an instructor at the University of Colorado in the Democratic Party primary for House District 13 to succeed term limited Rep. Tom Plant. In the reliably Democratic district, the two candidates differed primarily on emphasis, rather than the substance of issues, with Levy placing her focus on global warming, schools and health care. Levy also accumulated an extensive list of endorsements from local organizations and Democratic Party leaders.

Levy won 71% of the vote at the party assembly for the house district, forcing Rettew to petition onto the primary ballot. She again prevailed in the primary election, earning over 60% of the popular vote and the Democratic Party's nomination for the legislature. Having won her party primary and facing only a Libertarian opponent, Levy dedicated her political efforts during the remainder of the election season to promoting Referendum I, a statewide domestic partnerships initiative. In the general election, Levy defeated Libertarian Rand Fanshier with over 80% of the vote.

=== 2007 legislative session ===
In the 2007 session of the Colorado General Assembly, Levy sat on the House Judiciary Committee, the House Transportation and Energy Committee, the Legal Services Committee, and was vice-chair of the Joint Rule 36 Complaint Committee. The Rule 36 complaint committee reviews allegations of misconduct by lobbyists, and, during the 2007 session, heard a case involving robocalls made by a lobbyist for business leaders; Levy voted with the majority of the committee, which found that the calls, although deceptive, were protected political speech.

During the 2007 session, Levy was a prominent proponent of legislation related to energy efficiency standards. Successful legislation introduced by Levy included measures to require local governments to include updated energy-efficiency standards in building codes, to require utility companies to provide rebates to customers who use energy-efficient products, and to add a 50-cent fee to natural gas bills to pay for energy-efficiency programs. She was also the House sponsor of a Senate bill to impose new energy-efficiency standards on state buildings.

Following the legislative session, Levy sat on the interim Transportation Legislation Review Committee.

=== 2008 legislative session ===
In the 2008 session of the Colorado General Assembly, Levy sat on the House Judiciary Committee, the House Transportation and Energy Committee, and the Joint Legal Services Committee; she also sat on a special committee that recommended the censure of Rep. Douglas Bruce for kicking a photographer, and a special ethics panel investigating possible conflicts of interest for Colorado State Fair engineering contracts received by Sen. Abel Tapia. She was also named assistant chair of the house majority caucus for the 2008 session of the Colorado General Assembly.

In the 2008 legislative session, Levy introduced bills to prioritize transportation funds for communities that engage in smart growth planning, to impose new fees on vehicles with low fuel economies to fund the state's Office of Smart Growth, and a bill to extend state tax credits for historic preservation. A bill to require electric utilities to devote 2 percent of sales revenue to energy efficiency programs passed the house over objections that it would prove costly to municipal electric authorities.

Another of Levy's bills would have given judges, rather than prosecutors, discretion over whether minors can be charged as adults in criminal court. Although the legislation passed the state house, and was weakened in the Senate before final passage, it was vetoed by Gov. Bill Ritter, a former prosecutor.

Levy's campaign treasurer, Edith Stevens, was the target of vocal public criticism in late 2007 after she and her husband, a former district judge, won control of a parcel of a neighbor's property through adverse possession. Levy stood behind Stevens and her husband under pressure to disassociate them from her campaign, but Stevens ultimately resigned from her position as Levy's campaign treasurer. Following the controversy, Levy signed on during the 2008 session as a co-sponsor on legislation to modify Colorado's adverse possession law, and introduced legislation that would prevent county and district court judges from presiding over cases involving another current or former judge from the same jurisdiction. Both measures were passed by the General Assembly and were signed into law by Gov. Ritter.

In response to recommendations issued by a state commission on health care, Levy has expressed a desire to introduce legislation to create a single-payer health care system in Colorado, and has indicated that she may sponsor such a bill late in the 2008 session.

Levy was also a prominent voice of opposition to increased spending on security measures for the state capitol following a 2007 shooting in the building, arguing that existing security was sufficient and that the capitol was not a high-profile target.

Late in the 2008 legislative session, Levy announced that she would sponsor legislation to require disclosure by corporations of self-owned, or "captive" real estate investment trusts, a practice she denounced as "a tax-evasion scheme" used by companies including Wal-Mart. Although the measure passed the state legislature, it was vetoed by Gov. Bill Ritter, who cited problematic "technical aspects of the bill."

=== 2008 election ===
Levy sought seeking a second term in the Colorado House of Representatives in 2008. She faced businessman Robert Houdeshell, who entered the race in June 2008. During the campaign, Levy cited energy efficiency, health care, and education as her top priorities for a second term. Levy's re-election bid was endorsed by the Denver Post, the Boulder Daily Camera, and the Boulder Weekly. She won re-election with 74 percent of the popular vote.

During the 2008 election cycle, Levy moderated a Sierra Club-sponsored debate between Democratic Colorado State Senate candidates Cindy Carlisle and Rollie Heath, and backed Joan Fitz-Gerald in the contested Democratic primary for Colorado's 2nd Congressional district.

=== 2009 legislative session ===
For the 2009 legislative session, Levy was named to a seat on the Legislative Legal Services Committee and tapped to chair the House Judiciary Committee her selection was criticized by some House Republicans, who alleged that she was "soft on crime." After winning a second term, Levy was also elected Majority Whip by state house Democrats. Shortly before the beginning of the session, Levy was also named to a five-member ethics panel charged with investigating allegations of vote-buying on the part of Rep. David Balmer in a house leadership election; the case against Balmer was dropped due to lack of evidence.

In response to incidents of distracted driving in Colorado news, Levy first planned on sponsoring legislation to restrict text messaging while driving; however, after a fatal Colorado accident in November 2008, Levy expanded the bill's scope to ban both texting and cell phone headset use while driving. However, the final version that passed the legislature was significantly weakened, banning cell phone use only by drivers under 18, but still banning texting while driving for adult drivers. Although criticized by some law enforcement personnel as difficult to enforce, the ban went into effect in December 2009.

She introduced SB-051 Concerning measures to facilitate the financing of energy-efficient structures. This Bill significantly increased the role of the state in forcing citizens to use solar energy. The program administrators, who are unelected, will award the contracts worth tens of millions of dollars. In 2009, she received a score of 9.68 out of a possible 100 from the Colorado Union of Taxpayers based on her voting record in relation to government spending.

Levy again sponsored legislation to close a tax loophole for captive real estate investment trusts, and a bill to allow voters to drop off mail ballots at polling places. Two environmental measures sponsored by Levy failed — bills to create a corridor capacity strategic plan for the state transportation system and a bill to allow rural electric cooperatives to implement energy efficiency programs.

Near the end of the legislative session, Levy was the house sponsor of a failed sentencing reform measure which would reduce penalties for non-violent criminal offenders. Following the legislative session, Levy, a member of the Colorado Commission on Criminal & Juvenile Justice, was a member of a commission task force charged with studying possible sentencing reforms.

=== 2010 legislative session ===
During the 2010 Colorado General Assembly, Levy plans on sponsoring legislation to require jail time for repeat DUI offenders, and legislation to require additional disclosure surrounding board elections for rural electric cooperatives. In 2010, she received a score of 8.33 out of a possible 100 from the Colorado Union of Taxpayers for her voting record in relation to government spending.

=== 2012 election ===
In the 2012 General Election, Representative Levy faced Republican challenger Adam Ochs. Levy was reelected by a wide margin of 67% to 27% with an additional 5% of the vote going to libertarian candidate Howard P. Lambert.

=== Resignation from Colorado House of Representatives ===
Levy resigned her position in the Colorado House of Representatives on October 31, 2013, to become the Executive Director of the Colorado Center on Law and Policy on November 1, 2013.
