= KC Becker =

American politician from Colorado

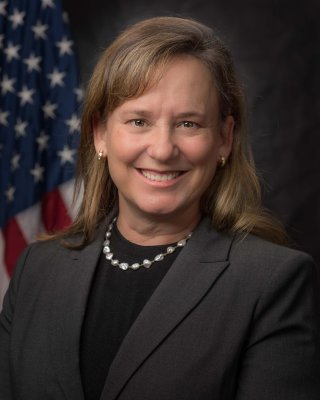

60th Speaker of the Colorado House of Representatives
- In office January 4, 2019 – January 13, 2021
- Preceded by: Crisanta Duran
- Succeeded by: Alec Garnett

Majority Leader of the Colorado House of Representatives
- In office January 11, 2017 – January 4, 2019
- Preceded by: Crisanta Duran
- Succeeded by: Alec Garnett

Member of the Colorado House of Representatives from the 13th district
- In office November 4, 2013 – January 13, 2021
- Preceded by: Claire Levy
- Succeeded by: Judy Amabile

Personal details
- Party: Democratic
- Spouse: Miles Kunkel
- Children: 2
- Education: College of William & Mary (BA); Lewis & Clark College (JD); University of Denver (MS)

Kathleen Collins Becker is an American politician who served in the Colorado House of Representatives from the 13th district from 2013 to 2021, as Majority Leader from 2017 to 2019, and as Speaker from 2019 to 2021, as a member of the Democratic Party. Prior to her tenure in the state legislature, she served on the city council in Boulder, Colorado.

After leaving the legislature, she served at the U.S. Environmental Protection Agency as the Regional Administrator for Region 8, which includes Colorado, Montana, North Dakota, South Dakota, Utah, Wyoming, and the tribal nations in those states.

== Early life and education ==
Kathleen Collins Becker graduated from the College of William & Mary with a Bachelor of Arts in government in 1991, from Lewis & Clark College with a Juris Doctor in 1996, and from the Daniels College of Business at University of Denver with a Master of Science in 2005. She worked as an attorney for the United States Department of the Interior and later moved to Boulder, Colorado, in 2002. She is married to Miles Kunkel, with whom she had two children.

== Career ==
=== Boulder city council ===
Becker was elected to a four-year term in a seat on Boulder's city council in 2009. During her tenure she served as the council's representative to the Denver Regional Council of Governments.

=== Colorado House of Representatives ===
==== Elections ====
Becker announced in 2013, that she would run for a seat in the Colorado House of Representatives from the 13th district which was held by retiring incumbent Representative Claire Levy. Levy resigned to become the executive director of the Colorado Center on Law and Policy and Becker was appointed by a thirty-five-member vacancy committee to fill the vacancy caused by the resignation. Becker won with seventeen votes in favor and twelve votes against her and four of the committee members were absent, one recused himself, and another abstained. Becker won in the 2014 election against Republican nominee Michael James Ocevar. She faced no opposition in the 2016 election. She defeated Republican nominee Kevin Sipple in the 2018 election.

Becker was unable to seek reelection in 2020 due to term limits. She endorsed Judy Amabile in the Democratic primary to succeed her and Amabile won in the primary and general election. Garnett was selected to succeed Becker as Speaker without opposition.

==== Tenure ====
Backer served on the eleven-member board of directors of the Colorado Housing and Finance Authority from 2019 to 2020. After the 2020 presidential election she dismissed a request by Republicans to investigate Colorado's election software and voting machines stating that the Republicans were supporting "debunked conspiracy theories".

She was selected to serve as Majority Leader in 2017. During her tenure as Majority Leader she oversaw the expulsion of Representative Steve Lebsock, the first representative expelled from the state house since 1915, due to sexual harassment allegations against Lebsock. The state house voted 52 to 9 in favor of expelling Lebsock, with Becker voting in favor despite initially opposing the expulsion. In 2018, Becker was selected to replace Crisanta Duran, who was term-limited, as speaker of the House of Representatives for the 2019 legislative session and Alec Garnett replaced Becker as majority leader.

== Electoral history ==
KC Becker electoral history

2014 Colorado House of Representatives 13th district election
Primary election
Party	Candidate	Votes	%
Democratic	KC Becker (incumbent)	5,022	100.00%
Total votes		5,022	100.00%
General election
Democratic	KC Becker (incumbent)	24,136	67.65%
Republican	Michael James Hocevar	11,541	32.35%
Total votes		35,677	100.00%

2016 Colorado House of Representatives 13th district election
Primary election
Party	Candidate	Votes	%
Democratic	KC Becker (incumbent)	5,879	100.00%
Total votes		5,879	100.00%
General election
Democratic	KC Becker (incumbent)	34,114	100.00%
Total votes		34,114	100.00%

2018 Colorado House of Representatives 13th district election
Primary election
Party	Candidate	Votes	%
Democratic	KC Becker (incumbent)	12,148	100.00%
Total votes		12,148	100.00%
General election
Democratic	KC Becker (incumbent)	32,499	73.15%
Republican	Kevin Sipple	11,929	26.85%
Total votes		44,428	100.00%

Colorado House of Representatives
Preceded by Crisanta Duran	Majority Leader of the Colorado House of Representatives; 2017–2019	Succeeded by Alec Garnett
Political offices
Preceded by Crisanta Duran	Speaker of the Colorado House of Representatives; 2019–2021	Succeeded by Alec Garnett
