= Alexis Hoffkling =

American politician

Member-elect of the Colorado House of Representatives from the 23rd district
- Assuming office January 2027
- Succeeding: Monica Duran

Personal details
- Party: Democratic
- Website: www.alexisforcolorado.com

Alexis Hoffkling is an American politician. Hoffkling is a member of the Democratic Party and is the member-elect for the 23rd district of the Colorado House of Representatives. Hoffkling is a transgender woman. Hoffkling is a primary care doctor and a union member.
