= Crisanta Duran =

American attorney and politician from Colorado

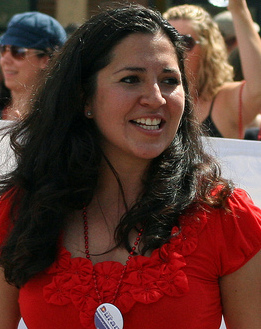
- Duran in 2010

59th Speaker of the Colorado House of Representatives
- In office January 11, 2017 – January 4, 2019
- Preceded by: Dickey Lee Hullinghorst
- Succeeded by: KC Becker

Majority Leader of the Colorado House of Representatives
- In office January 7, 2015 – January 11, 2017
- Preceded by: Dickey Lee Hullinghorst
- Succeeded by: KC Becker

Member of the Colorado House of Representatives from the 5th district
- In office January 11, 2011 – January 4, 2019
- Preceded by: Joel Judd
- Succeeded by: Alex Valdez

Personal details
- Born: August 23, 1980 (age 46) Boulder, Colorado, U.S.
- Party: Democratic
- Education: University of Denver (BA); University of Colorado, Boulder (JD)

Crisanta Duran (born August 23, 1980) is a former American politician who served as the 38th Speaker of the Colorado House of Representatives from 2017 to 2019. A member of the Democratic Party, she was the Colorado State Representative for the 5th district from 2011 to 2019, which encompasses part of northwest Denver. She served as Majority Leader from 2015 to 2017. Duran is the first and only Latina elected Speaker of the House in state history.

Duran briefly ran for Colorado's 1st congressional district in 2020 and for Colorado Attorney General in 2026 before dropping out. She has formed an exploratory to challenge freshman representative Melat Kiros in CO-1 in the 2028 Democratic primary.

== Early life ==
Duran was born in Boulder, Colorado, and is one of three children. Duran's father worked at a tire shop before eventually becoming the president of the United Food and Commercial Workers Local 7 union.

== Education ==
Duran graduated from the University of Denver in 2002, double-majoring in Spanish and public policy. Duran earned a Juris Doctor degree from the University of Colorado.

== Career ==
Duran started her legal career as an attorney with the United Food and Commercial Workers.

=== Colorado House of Representatives ===
In 2010, Duran won election to the Colorado House of Representatives for a seat based in western Denver. Duran was elected as the Colorado House majority leader in November 2014. In 2014, the Washington Post named Duran to its "40 under 40" list of rising political stars. She currently serves on the Board of Advisors of Let America Vote, an organization founded by former Missouri Secretary of State Jason Kander that aims to end voter suppression.

=== Congressional run ===
On February 24, 2019, Duran announced her campaign to represent Colorado's 1st congressional district after the 2020 United States House of Representatives elections. However, she ended her campaign on October 11, 2019 after failing to attract sufficient support or campaign contributions. Duran had previously considered a run for the United States Senate.

=== Colorado Attorney General ===
On February 27, 2025, Duran announced her campaign for Colorado Attorney General in the Democratic Primary of the 2026 Colorado Attorney General election.

== Awards ==
- 2016 Gabrielle Giffords Rising Star Award. Presented by EMILY's List. April 12, 2016.

== See also ==
- List of female speakers of legislatures in the United States

Colorado House of Representatives
Preceded by Dickey Lee Hullinghorst	Majority Leader of the Colorado House of Representatives; 2015–2017	Succeeded by KC Becker
Political offices
Preceded by Dickey Lee Hullinghorst	Speaker of the Colorado House of Representatives; 2017–2019	Succeeded by KC Becker
