= Colorado's 49th House of Representatives district =

American legislative district

Colorado's 49th State House of Representatives district
Representative
Lesley Smith; D–Boulder
- Demographics: 87% White; 1% Black; 6% Hispanic; 1% Asian; 1% Native American; 4% Multiracial
- Population (2024): 85,158

Colorado's 49th House of Representatives district is one of 65 districts in the Colorado House of Representatives. It has been represented by Lesley Smith since 2025.

== Members ==
- Judy Amabile (2021–2025)
- Lesley Smith (since 2025)
