= Product Architects, Inc. =

American water bottle brand

Polar Bottle Polar Bottle
- Company type: Privately held
- Industry: Sport equipment
- Founded: 1994
- Headquarters: 2605 Trade Centre Ave STE D, Longmont, Colorado 80503, United States
- Products: Water bottles
- Number of employees: 38
- Website: www.polarbottle.com

Polar Bottle is a brand of sport and bike water bottles. The company is based out of Longmont, Colorado where it assembles and ships all of its products.

== History ==
Polar Bottle was founded by Robert Heiberger and Judy Amabile in 1994, when the company was originally named Product Architects Inc. The pair, along with their five employees, ran the company from the garage of their home for a year before moving operations to an industrial park. The business acquired its first national buyer in the form of The Container Store in April 1995 and entered the sporting goods market when they were picked up by Dick's Sporting Goods later that year. The company enjoyed steady growth and was nominated as one of Colorado’s top small businesses in 2010 by ColoradoBiz Magazine. In 2019, Polar Bottle was acquired by HydraPak, LLC.

== Products ==
=== Polar Bottle ===
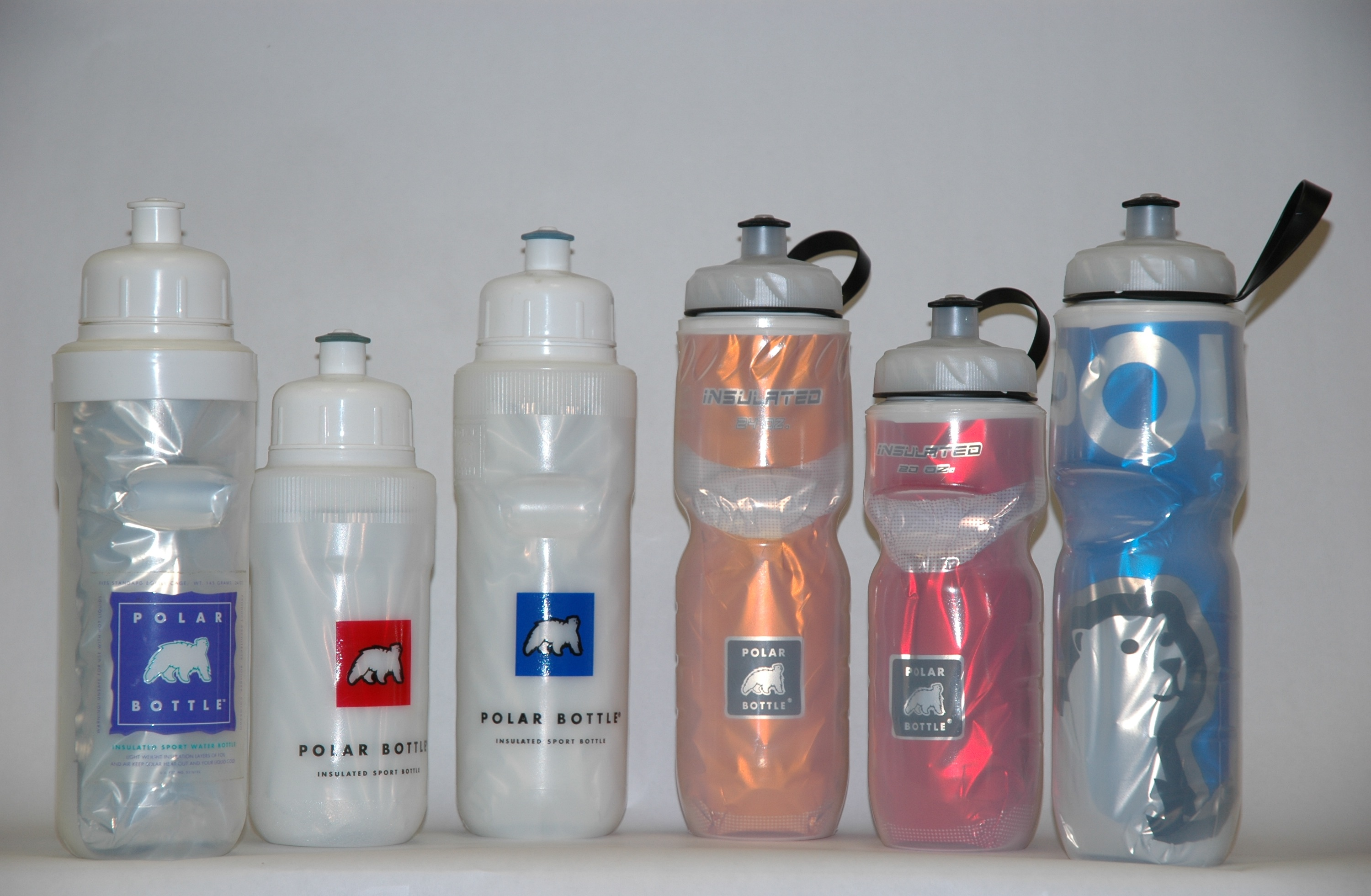
From left to right: The original Polar Bottle; the addition of a removable valve and screen-printed logo (in 20- and 24-ounce sizes); the bottle redesign; and modern bottles (in 20- and 24-ounce sizes).

The Polar Bottle was invented by Robert Heiberger, with prototypes being made as early as 1989. Heiberger, a mechanical engineer working with heat loss in the medical technology design field, realized that the systems he employed to warm blood samples to body temperature could be used in reverse to keep liquid cool in a bottle. The bottle features a dual-wall construction which creates a layer of insulating air between the liquid inside the bottle and the outside environment. Between the two bottle layers is a thin foil liner that reflects solar energy away from the bottle. The bottle is – and has always been – made from BPA- and phthalate-free low-density polyethylene. It is produced in 24-ounce (710 ml) and 20-ounce (590 ml) sizes. The bottles are blow-molded in Denver, CO. Since the Polar Bottle’s introduction, it has undergone continual improvements to both form and function. The first of these changes occurred in 1998 when a removable valve system was added to the cap to facilitate cleaning. In 2006, the bottle’s aesthetic was updated with a sleeker body design, the addition of a carrying strap, and the introduction of a variety of colored liners. In 2010, the company added 8 new graphic designs to their existing array of colored liners and, in response to consumer feedback, reduced the thickness of the bottle walls to make squeezing the bottle easier.

=== Half Twist ===
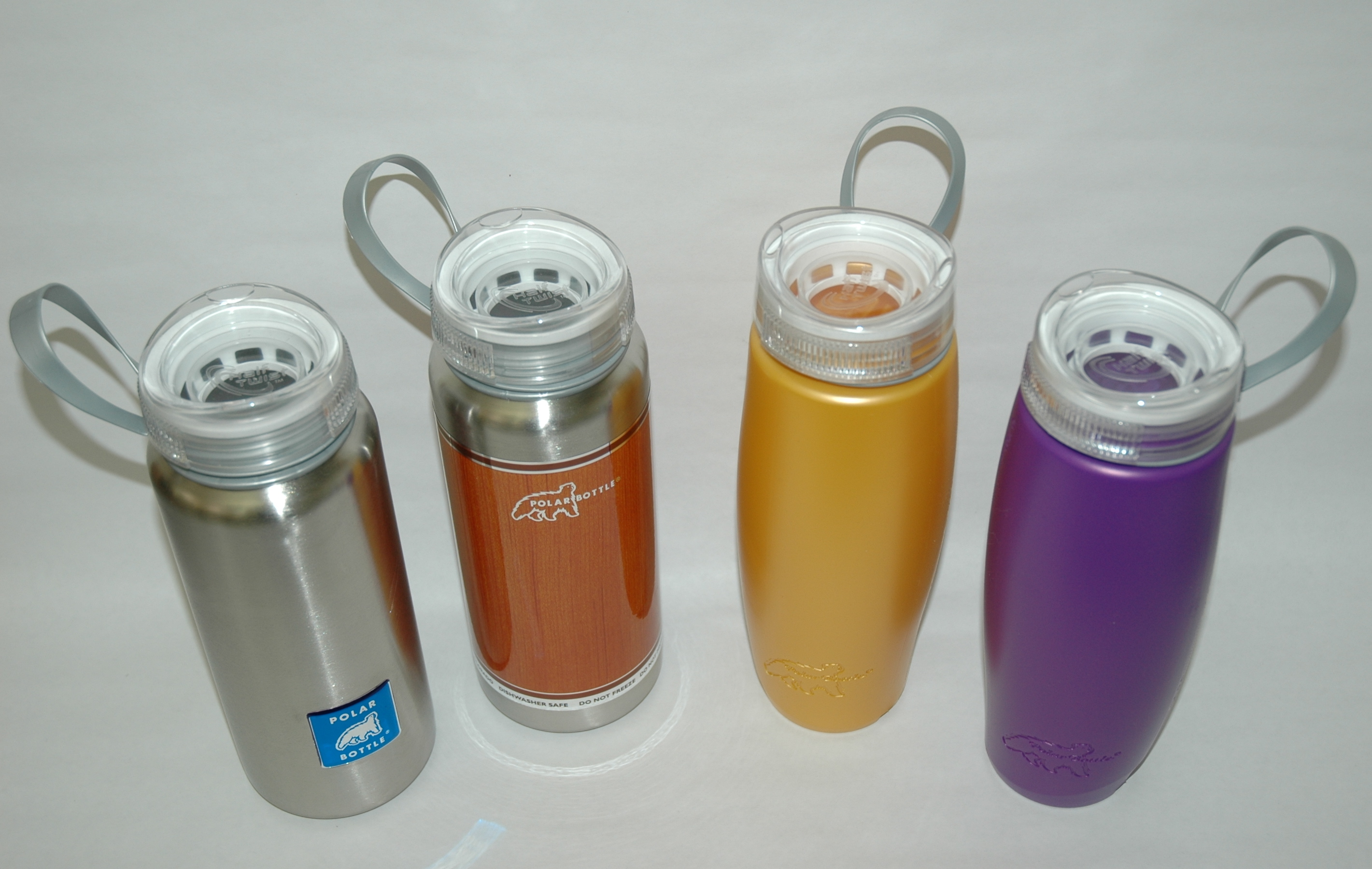
Half Twist bottles in stainless steel and plastic (HDPE) varieties

The Half Twist bottle was introduced in 2010 in an effort to expand the scope of Product Architects’ hydration options beyond the sports bottle market. The primary feature of the bottle is the Half Twist cap, which is fitted with a silicone gasket. The lid allows the user to drink directly from the cap without removing it from the bottle and the gasket creates a watertight seal when closed. The Half Twist received positive reviews, though some users found the lid difficult to operate. The lid comes on two types of bottles: a 24-ounce (710 ml) high-density polyethylene bottle and a 28-ounce (828 ml) stainless steel bottle. Both bottle types are free from BPA and phthalates.

=== Modern Wallet ===
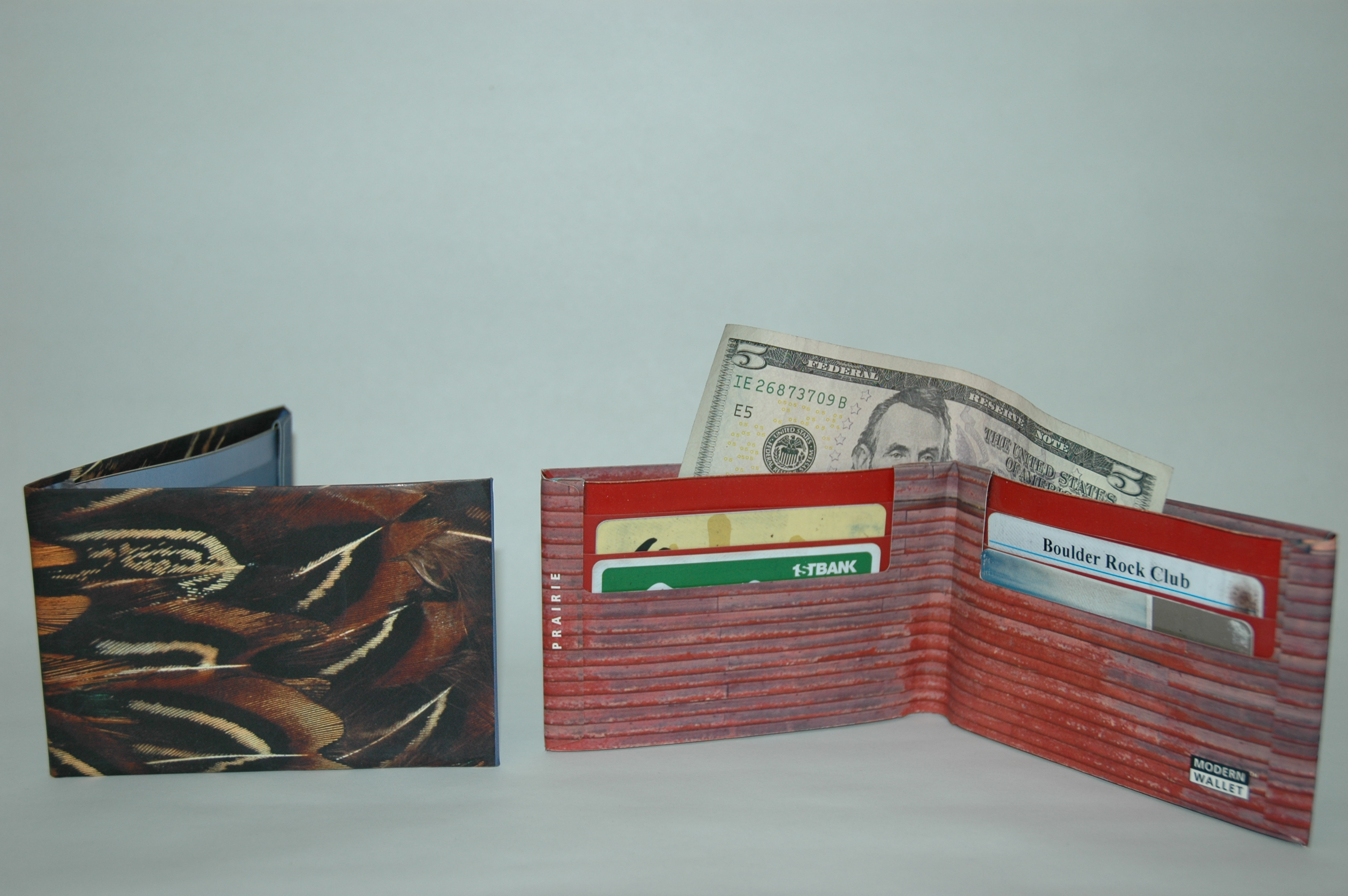
The “Wings” and “Prairie” Modern Wallet designs

Product Architects released the Modern Wallet in 2004. The wallet was made of Teslin, a synthetic material that is durable, flexible, breathable, and waterproof. It featured a wide variety of pictures and designs that were shown on both the inside and outside of the wallet. It was sold primarily to independent bicycle dealers, many of whom already carried the Polar Bottle. The Modern Wallet was discontinued in 2008.
