= Colorado's 13th House of Representatives district =

American legislative district

Colorado's 13th State House of Representatives district
Representative
Julie McCluskie; D–Dillon
- Registration: 26.1% Republican; 24.3% Democratic; 47.6% No party preference
- Demographics: 82.9% White; 0.8% Black; 13.9% Hispanic; 0.9% Asian; 0.9% Native American; 0.1% Hawaiian/Pacific Islander; 6.2% Other; 8.2% Multiracial
- Population (2020): 91,153

Colorado's 13th House of Representatives district is one of 65 districts in the Colorado House of Representatives. It has been represented by Democrat Julie McCluskie since 2019.

== Geography ==
District 13 covers Chaffee, Grand, Jackson, Lake, Park, and Summit Counties. Communities in the district include Salida, Breckenridge, Silverthorne, Frisco, and Buena Vista.

The district overlaps with Colorado's 2nd and 7th congressional districts, and the 4th and 8th districts of the Colorado Senate.

== Recent election results ==
=== 2022 ===
2022 Colorado's 13th House of Representatives district Democratic primary
Party	Candidate	Votes	%
Democratic	Julie McCluskie (incumbent) (Note: McCluskie was redistricted from the 61st district.)	8,741	100.00%
Total votes		8,741	100.00%

2022 Colorado's 13th House of Representatives district Republican primary
Party	Candidate	Votes	%
Republican	David Buckley	8,821	100.00%
Total votes		8,821	100.00%

2022 Colorado's 13th House of Representatives district general election
Party	Candidate	Votes	%
Democratic	Julie McCluskie (incumbent)	25,428	56.03%
Republican	David Buckley	19,956	43.97%
Total votes		45,384	100.00%
Democratic hold			

=== 2020 ===
2020 Colorado's 13th House of Representatives district Democratic primary
Party	Candidate	Votes	%
Democratic	Judy Amabile	18,131	100.00%
Total votes		18,131	100.00%

2020 Colorado's 13th House of Representatives district Republican primary
Party	Candidate	Votes	%
Republican	Kevin Sipple	4,736	100.00%
Total votes		4,736	100.00%

2020 Colorado's 13th House of Representatives district general election
Party	Candidate	Votes	%
Democratic	Judy Amabile	34,652	68.24%
Republican	Kevin Sipple	14,418	28.39%
Libertarian	James E. "Jed" Gilman	1,713	3.37%
Total votes		50,783	100.00%
Democratic hold			

=== 2018 ===
2018 Colorado's 13th House of Representatives district Democratic primary
Party	Candidate	Votes	%
Democratic	K.C. Becker (incumbent)	12,148	100.00%
Total votes		12,148	100.00%

2018 Colorado's 13th House of Representatives district Republican primary
Party	Candidate	Votes	%
Republican	Kevin Sipple	3,797	100.00%
Total votes		3,797	100.00%

2018 Colorado's 13th House of Representatives district general election
Party	Candidate	Votes	%
Democratic	K.C. Becker (incumbent)	32,499	73.15%
Republican	Kevin Sipple	11,929	26.85%
Total votes		44,428	100.00%
Democratic hold			

=== 2016 ===
2016 Colorado's 13th House of Representatives district Democratic primary
Party	Candidate	Votes	%
Democratic	KC Becker (incumbent)	5,879	100.00%
Total votes		5,879	100.00%

2016 Colorado's 13th House of Representatives district general election
Party	Candidate	Votes	%
Democratic	KC Becker (incumbent)	34,114	100.00%
Total votes		34,114	100.00%
Democratic hold			

=== 2014 ===
2014 Colorado's 13th House of Representatives district Democratic primary
Party	Candidate	Votes	%
Democratic	KC Becker (incumbent) (Note: Becker was selected by a vacancy committee to replace Claire Levy, who resigned to become the executive director of the Colorado Center on Law and Policy.)	5,022	100.00%
Total votes		5,022	100.00%

2014 Colorado's 13th House of Representatives district Republican primary
Party	Candidate	Votes	%
Republican	Michael James Hocevar	3,487	100.00%
Total votes		3,487	100.00%

2014 Colorado's 13th House of Representatives district general election
Party	Candidate	Votes	%
Democratic	KC Becker (incumbent)	24,136	67.65%
Republican	Michael James Hocevar	11,541	32.35%
Total votes		35,677	100.00%
Democratic hold			

=== 2012 ===
2012 Colorado's 13th House of Representatives district Democratic primary
Party	Candidate	Votes	%
Democratic	Claire Levy (incumbent)	6,202	100.00%
Total votes		6,202	100.00%

2012 Colorado's 13th House of Representatives district Republican primary
Party	Candidate	Votes	%
Republican	Adam Ochs	3,146	100.00%
Total votes		3,146	100.00%

2012 Colorado's 13th House of Representatives district general election
Party	Candidate	Votes	%
Democratic	Claire Levy (incumbent)	30,814	67.08%
Republican	Adam Ochs	12,596	27.42%
Libertarian	Howard P. Lambert	2,526	5.50%
Total votes		43,853	100.00%
Democratic hold			

=== 2010 ===
2010 Colorado's 13th House of Representatives Democratic primary
Party	Candidate	Votes	%
Democratic	Claire Levy (incumbent)	7,048	100.00%
Total votes		7,048	100.00%

2010 Colorado's 13th House of Representatives Republican primary
Party	Candidate	Votes	%
Republican	Robert Houdeshell	2,874	100.00%
Total votes		2,874	100.00%

2010 Colorado's 13th House of Representatives general election
Party	Candidate	Votes	%
Democratic	Claire Levy (incumbent)	22,816	71.35%
Republican	Robert Houdeshell	9,163	28.65%
Total votes		31,979	100.00%
Democratic hold			

=== 2008 ===
2008 Colorado's 13th House of Representatives Democratic primary
Party	Candidate	Votes	%
Democratic	Claire Levy (incumbent)	6,327	100.00%
Total votes		6,327	100.00%

2008 Colorado's 13th House of Representatives Republican primary
Party	Candidate	Votes	%
Republican	Robert E. Houdeshell	1,514	100.00%
Total votes		1,514	100.00%

2008 Colorado's 13th House of Representatives general election
Party	Candidate	Votes	%
Democratic	Claire Levy (incumbent)	30,259	73.91%
Republican	Robert E. Houdeshell	10,682	26.09%
Total votes		40,941	100.00%
