= Mosaic Outdoor Clubs of America =

International network of Jewish outdoor clubs

Mosaic Outdoor Clubs of America (often abbreviated MOCA or Mosaic) is an international non-profit network of Jewish outdoor clubs in the United States, Canada, and Israel.

== History and Organization ==
The first Mosaic Club was founded in Colorado by Steve Harris Millmond in reaction to his perception that modern Judaism had lost touch with the outdoors and the environment. The name, "Mosaic", refers to Moses, the Biblical prophet and an "outdoor Jew". The initial group still exists as the Mosaic Outdoor Mountain Club; its first event, a hike in the Rocky Mountains of Colorado, was held in December 1988.

The international umbrella organization, Mosaic Outdoor Clubs of America, was founded in 1995, incorporated in May 1996, and obtained 501(c)(3) non-profit status in April 1997; Rick Dronsky was its first executive director, serving from 1996 until 2002. Mosaic Outdoor Clubs of American currently recognizes local chapters in three countries and is overseen by a volunteer board of directors that has traditionally been elected at Mosaic's annual international gathering. The umbrella organization is largely responsible for coordinating the annual gathering and assisting with the formation of new chapters. When its first board was elected in 1998, twelve chapters were recognized; as of 2007, this total now stands at over 20.

Local chapters host hikes, trail cleanups, and environmental education efforts, in addition to being a social and recreational outlet and a meeting venue for Jewish singles interested in the outdoors. The more active local affiliates count their membership in the hundreds, and host outdoor events every weekend or several times per month.

International gatherings of Mosaic members have been held annually since 1991, usually in the United States around the Labor Day weekend; the 2007 international event saw over 200 attendees.
