= Colorado's 5th House of Representatives district =

American legislative district

Colorado's 5th State House of Representatives district
Representative
| Alex Valdez; D–Denver |
- Demographics: 55% White; 5% Black; 31% Hispanic; 3% Asian; 0% Native American; 1% Multiracial
- Population (2021): 85,697

Colorado's 5th House of Representatives district is one of 65 districts in the Colorado House of Representatives. It has been represented by Democrat Alex Valdez since 2019.

== Geography ==
District 5 is located in central Denver containing areas including Downtown Denver.

== Members ==
- Joel Judd (2003–2011)
- Crisanta Duran (2011–2019)
- Alex Valdez (since 2018)
