= Kenny Nguyen (politician) =

American politician

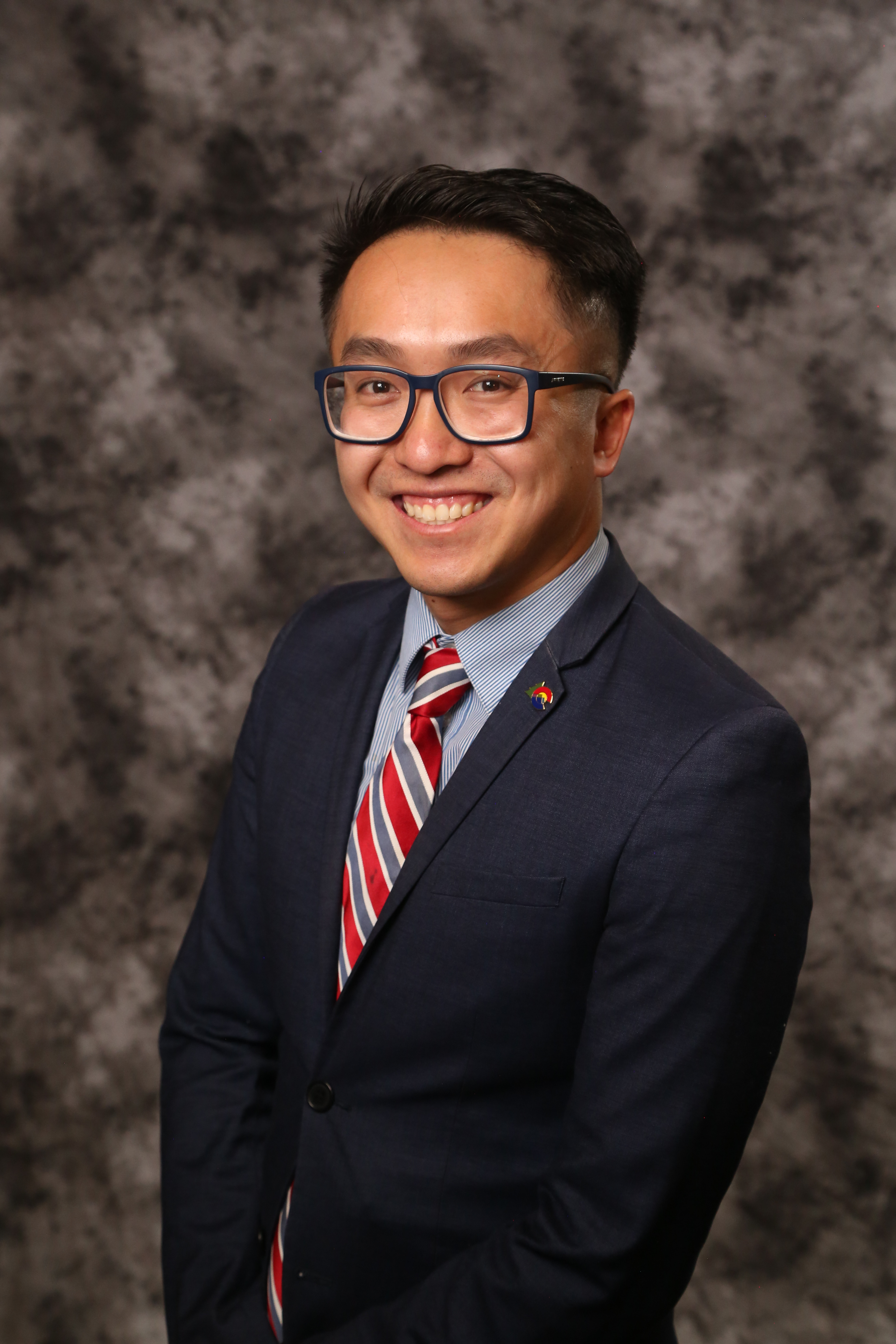
- Nguyen in 2026

Member of the Colorado House of Representatives from the 33rd district
- Incumbent
- Assumed office January 14, 2026
- Preceded by: William Lindstedt

Broomfield City Council Member & County Commissioner for Ward 1
- In office January 2023 – January 2026

Personal details
- Born: Kenny Van Nguyen; 1994 or 1995 (age 31–32) Colorado
- Party: Democratic
- Education: University of Colorado Boulder; University of Colorado Denver (MPA)

Kenny Van Nguyen (born 1994 or 1995) is an American politician and a Democratic member of the Colorado House of Representatives. Nguyen represents House District 33, which includes Adams, Broomfield, and Weld counties and was selected to fill the vacancy left by former state representative William Lindstedt who was appointed to fill the vacancy of his predecessor Faith Winter in the Colorado Senate.

== Early Life & Education ==
Nguyen was born and raised in Colorado to Vietnamese refugees from the Vietnam War. He was the first in his family to go to college and graduated with a dual degree in Political Science and Communications from the University of Colorado Boulder in 2016 and graduated with a Master of Public Administration (MPA) from the University of Colorado Denver in 2025.

== Career & Volunteer Service ==
Nguyen served in volunteer-based organizations an AmeriCorp Service member for VISTA and Notre Dame, working with youth in underserved communities for the "I Have a Dream" Foundation at Boulder County, Public Achievement, and National Model United Nations.

Nguyen began his career in politics as a community organizer for the Jared Polis for Governor campaign in 2018 and served as an Executive Assistant to Lieutenant Governor Dianne Primavera for five and a half years. Nguyen served as the Vice-Chair of the Asian American Pacific Islander Initiative of Colorado Democrats and began his service to the City and County of Broomfield as a member and chair of the Broomfield Arts, History and Cultural Council. Nguyen also served the Broomfield Democratic Party as the party's secretary and was elected to Broomfield City Council as a Council Member for Ward 1 in 2023. On Broomfield City Council, Nguyen’s assignments included the Broomfield Chamber of Commerce, Metro Area County Commissioners, and the Northwest Mayors & Commissioners Coalition.

Prior to Nguyen's appointment to the Colorado State Legislature, he continued his service on Broomfield City Council and worked at the Colorado Department of Revenue's Division of Gaming.

== Legislative Career ==
On January 12, 2026, Nguyen was selected by the House District 33 Vacancy Committee to serve as state representative with former state representative William Lindstedt being appointed to serve as state senator following the passing of state senator Faith Winter. During the vacancy committee, Nguyen earned 52.9% of the vote, defeating fellow Broomfield City Council member Heidi Henkel, who received 47.1% of the vote.

During the 2026 legislative session, Nguyen became the first Vietnamese-American to serve as a member of the Colorado General Assembly. Nguyen served as a member of the House State, Civic, Military & Veterans Affairs and House Transportation, Housing & Local Government committees and was a co-prime sponsor on ten bills and one resolution with eight of his bills being signed into law by Governor Jared Polis.

Nguyen is currently running as the incumbent for State Representative of Colorado’s 33rd House District against Democrat Heidi Henkel and Republican Nate Jorgensen.
