= Steve Lebsock =

American politician

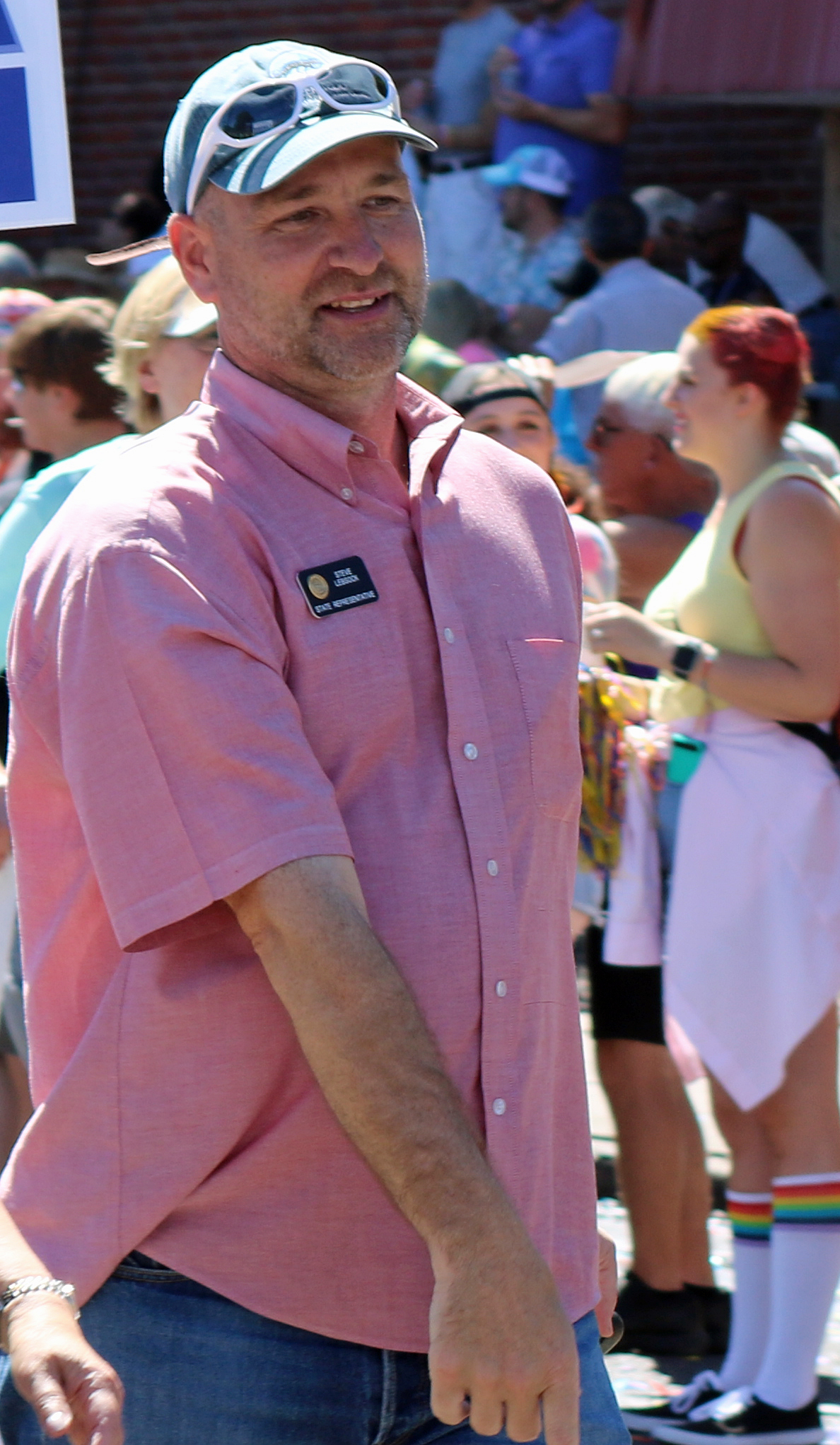

Member of the Colorado House of Representatives from the 34th district
- In office January 9, 2013 – March 2, 2018
- Preceded by: John Soper
- Succeeded by: Alexander Winkler

Personal details
- Born: Sterling, Colorado, U.S.
- Party: Democratic (until 2018); Republican (since 2018)
- Spouse: Nina
- Children: 3
- Education: Metropolitan State University of Denver (BA)

Military service
- Allegiance: United States
- Branch/service: United States Marine Corps
- Years of service: 1988-1991

Steve Lebsock is an American politician who served in the Colorado House of Representatives from the 34th district as a member of the Democratic and Republican parties from 2013 until his expulsion in 2018. Prior to his tenure in the state house he served on the city council in Thornton, Colorado from 2003 to 2011.

Lebsock was born in Sterling, Colorado, and educated at Westminster High School and the Metropolitan State University of Denver. He was in the United States Marine Corps for three years and served on the Thornton city council for eight years. Lebsock was elected to the state house in the 2012 election and reelected in the 2014 and 2016 elections. He became the chair of the Local Government committee.

During his campaign for Colorado State Treasurer he was accused by multiple women, including Representative Faith Winter, of sexual harassment and became the first member of the state house expelled since William W. Howland's expulsion in 1915. A petition calling for his resignation received over 50,000 signatures while Lebsock claimed that he was being blackmailed and extorted by the allegations. He left the Democratic caucus before joining the Republican Party and Alexander Winkler was appointed to replace him.

== Early life and education ==
Steve Lebsock was born in Sterling, Colorado, and married Nina, with whom he had three children. He graduated from Westminster High School. He served in the United States Marine Corps from 1988 to 1991. In 1998, he graduated from the Metropolitan State University of Denver with a Bachelor of Arts degree in sociology. He served on the city council in Thornton, Colorado from 2003 to 2011, and as the mayor pro tempore from 2007 to 2009.

== Career ==
=== Colorado House of Representatives ===
Lebsock received the Democratic nomination to run for a seat in the Colorado House of Representatives from the 34th district in the 2012 election and defeated Republican nominee Jodina B. Widhalm in the general election. He defeated Republican nominee Alexander Winkler in the 2014 election. He defeated Republican nominee Dustin Johnson and Green Party nominee Jenice Dove in the 2016 election.

Walker Stapleton, the incumbent Republican State Treasurer, was term-limited in the 2018 election. Lebsock announced on March 25, 2017, that he would run for the Democratic nomination for state treasurer. He stated that he would petition his way onto the primary ballot during the sexual harassment investigation into him, but he was later unable to run for the office after switching his political affiliation due to him not being a Republican long enough.

=== Expulsion ===
Representative Faith Winter and four other women made a total of eleven sexual harassment allegations against Lebsock that were found credible. He denied the allegations in a twenty-eight page letter to other members of the state house, in a YouTube video, and also took a lie detector test. Governor John Hickenlooper and Speaker Crisanta Duran called for him to resign. He claimed that the allegations were "about blackmail and coercion and extortion" in an attempt to get him to resign and accused the Democrats of betraying him. Lebsock served as the chair of the Local Government committee, but was temporarily removed during the investigation into the allegations. A petition calling for his resignation received over 50,000 signatures, but he stated on November 28, 2017, that he would not resign.

Representative KC Becker introduced the resolution to expel Lebsock on February 27, 2018. Lebsock stated that "my colleagues are not going to expel me", but the two-thirds majority required for expulsion was fulfilled by a fifty-two to nine vote on March 2 which found him guilty. Representative Yeulin Willett stated that he did not believe that Lebsock's behavior warranted an expulsion. Lebsock became the first member of the state house to be expelled since William Howland was expelled for perjury during a bribery investigation in 1915.

Lebsock stated that he would not caucus with the Democrats in the 2018 session and later changed his political affiliation to Republican on March 2, which allowed the Republicans to appoint his successor.

The Republican vacancy committee voted on March 23, to appoint Winkler to fill Lebsock's seat against Casey Cole with Winkler receiving twelve votes to Cole's eleven votes. Democratic nominee Kyle Mullica defeated Winkler in the 2018 election.

== Electoral history ==
2012 Colorado House of Representatives 34th district election
Primary election
Party	Candidate	Votes	%
Democratic	Steve Lebsock	2,577	100.00%
Total votes		2,577	100.00%
General election
Democratic	Steve Lebsock	16,944	60.61%
Republican	Jodina B. Widhalm	11,014	39.39%
Total votes		27,958	100.00%

2014 Colorado House of Representatives 34th district election
Primary election
Party	Candidate	Votes	%
Democratic	Steve Lebsock (incumbent)	2,629	100.00%
Total votes		2,629	100.00%
General election
Democratic	Steve Lebsock (incumbent)	11,146	54.88%
Republican	Alexander Winkler	9,164	45.12%
Total votes		20,310	100.00%

2016 Colorado House of Representatives 34th district election
Primary election
Party	Candidate	Votes	%
Democratic	Steve Lebsock (incumbent)	2,901	100.00%
Total votes		2,901	100.00%
General election
Democratic	Steve Lebsock (incumbent)	14,865	50.00%
Republican	Dustin Johnson	13,061	43.94%
Green	Jenice Dove	1,802	6.06%
Total votes		29,728	100.00%

== See also ==
- List of American politicians who switched parties in office
