= Lois Tochtrop =

American politician

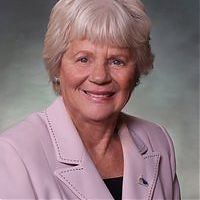

Member of the Colorado Senate from the 24th district
- In office January 10, 2007 – January 7, 2015
- Preceded by: Alice Nichol
- Succeeded by: Beth Martinez Humenik

Personal details
- Born: January 31, 1941 (age 85)
- Party: Democratic
- Spouse: Alan

Lois Tochtrop is a former legislator in the U.S. state of Colorado. Elected to the Colorado State Senate as a Democrat, Tochtrop represented Senate District 24, which covers the northwestern portion of Adams County including Westminster, Northglenn, and portions of Thornton from 2007 until January 2015. Term limited, she did not seek re-election in 2014.
