= Humenik =

Humenik is a surname. Notable people with the surname include:

- Beth Martinez Humenik, American politician
- Ed Humenik (born 1959), American golfer
