= Colorado Center Party =

Minor political party

- Leader: Steve Yurash
- Founder: Steve Yurash
- Founded: January 2022; 4 years ago
- Headquarters: Fort Collins
- Ideology: Syncretic politics Centrism; Electoral reform
- Political position: Center

Website
- coloradocenterparty.org

The Colorado Center Party is a minor third party in the United States state of Colorado, primarily centered around Fort Collins and the second congressional district, promoting a centrist political program. The party achieved minor party status in September 2023.

== History ==
The party was founded by Steve Yurash, a Never Trump Republican, who left the Republican party in 2019 and spent two years working on forming his own political party. Yurash stated that "The Center Party is more left-leaning on the social issues and more right-leaning on the fiscal issues and crime;" when the party launched in January 2022, they further stated that they aim to "bring civility back to politics" and "protect us from the far left and the far right," backing positions the party views as bipartisan and "common sense" with the party aiming to attract the 47% of Colorado's electorate that are registered political independents. The party officially got over 1,000 signatures in a ballot access petition and received minor party status in Colorado on September 7, 2023. As such, the party no longer needs to gather signatures to stand their candidates, removing one of the largest barriers to their participation in elections.

In 2024, the party chose to only stand two candidates, Yurash for Colorado House of Representatives district 52, and Bernadette Tedesco for Adams County commissioner. In 2025, Yurash ran for Fort Collins city council. Yurash again ran for district 52 in 2026 with Tim Martin in district 38 and with Stephen Fowler for Larimer County commissioner.

== Election results ==
=== 2022 ===
Yurash stood for Colorado's 2nd congressional district during the 2022 United States House of Representatives elections in Colorado, centering his campaign around that "[The party is] firmly firmly anti-crime and support our police to handle crime with civilian oversight, and we support more gun control." Yurash got 2,876 votes, or 0.8% of the electorate earning a distant third place; the party performed better than the American Constitution Party and the Unity Party of America.

Colorado's 2nd congressional district, 2022
Party	Candidate	Votes	%
Democratic	Joe Neguse (incumbent)	244,107	70%
Republican	Marshall Dawson	97,770	28%
Center	Steve Yurash	2,876	0.8%
American Constitution	Gary L. Nation	2,188	0.6%
Unity	Tim Wolf	1,968	0.6%
Total votes		348,839	100.0
Democratic hold			

=== 2024 ===
Yurash would contest the nominally unopposed Democrat Yara Zokaie for the Colorado House of Representatives' 52nd District. Yurash had primarily built his campaign on the fact there is no Republican in the race, leaving him as the only real opposition to Zokaie. Yurash's platform is largely opposed of Zokaie's, with Yurash supporting property tax relief, TABOR tax refunds, maintaining and supporting privatized utilities, no changes to the state's land use law, preserving cash bail, (Note: Yurash previously campaigned on abolishing Cash Bail) supporting school choice, and protecting the 2nd Amendment. The Colorado Forward Party would endorse Yarush who would earn 18,088 votes, or 36.7% of the electorate.

The party also stood a second candidate, Bernadette Tedesco, for Commissioner of Adams County. Tedesco ran to "foster unity and collaboration" within the county, and claims to be a champion for the working class. Her platform called for a "balanced" energy position supporting both fossil fuels and green energy, enhancing public safety, reducing homelessness, and a reduction of property taxes. Tedesco also ran against nominally unopposed Democrat Kathy Henson and would come in second place with 52,667 votes or 37.65% of the electorate.

A third candidate, Alexander “Skinny” Winkler, stood for the party in the 34th district. Winkler had previously represented the 34th district as a Republican during the 75th Colorado General Assembly from 2018 to 2019 as an appointment when his predecessor Steve Lebsock was expelled from the house due to sexual harassment allegations. He received just 2.31% of the vote.

Colorado's 52nd state congressional district, 2024
Party	Candidate	Votes	%
Democratic	Yara Zokaie	31,167	63.3%
Center	Steve Yurash	18,088	36.7%
Total votes		49,255	100%

Adams County Commissioner, 2024
Party	Candidate	Votes	%
Democratic	Kathy Henson	87,216	62.35%
Center	Bernadette Tedesco	52,667	37.65%
Total votes		139,883	100%

Colorado's 34th state congressional district, 2024
Party	Candidate	Votes	%
Democratic	Jenny Willford (incumbent)	21,326	50.64%
Republican	Craig Sullivan	18,864	44.79%
Center	Alexander "Skinny" Winkler	971	2.31%
Independent	Mark Bromley	952	2.26%
Total votes		42,113	100%
Democratic hold			

=== 2025 ===
Following their defeat in the House of Representatives in 2022, and then the Colorado House of Representatives in 2024, Yurash and the party have focused their efforts on local municipal government with Yurash running for the third district of the Fort Collins City Council in 2025. Yarush ran on a NIMBY stance, vowing to preserve zoning laws and block any high-density housing projects in the district as both major party candidates had vowed to build some form of housing expansion. Yurash would be endorsed by former Fort Collins Mayor Ray Martinez and Diggs Brown, a former councilmen from the district. Yurash would come in second place with 37.62% of the vote in the ranked choice vote.

Additionally, Matthew Snider ran for a seat on the Aurora city council after the resignation of Dustin Zvonek. The office was granted by appointment there was no election, with the city council ultimately choosing Amsalu Kassaw to fill the seat. Snider had previously gained notoriety when he sued the city council for lifting its ban on pit bulls, forcing the city to instead put the issue to a ballot measure; in the ballot, voters chose to lift the ban with 44,341 votes to 40,184.

Fort Collins City Council District 3, 2025
Party	Candidate	Votes	%
Democratic	Josh Fudge	3,176	47.02%
Center	Steve Yurash	2,215	32.80%
Republican	Lance Smith	1,363	20.18%
Total votes		6,754	100%

=== 2026 ===
Yurash again ran for the 52nd state congressional district in the 2026 election again against Yara Zokaie. No Republican challenged Zokaie leaving Yurash as her only competition. Yurash tried to leverage Zokaie's self described stance as a "Democratic Socialist", supporter of Zohran Mamdani and Hasan Piker, and her membership in the Democratic Socialists of America (DSA) to position himself as a centrist candidate that both Republicans and Democrats can vote for. This came amidst a split in the Colorado Democratic Party as governor Jared Polis has attacked the DSA and its influence on state politics. Yurash would get 9,038 votes, half what he earned in 2024, as his vote share slid from 36.7% to 28.3%.

Additionally, the party stood Tim Martin in the 38th house district against Democrat Gretchen Rydin. Martin, who worked in private security before becoming an employee of the Colorado Department of Human Services, campaigned on improving homeless outreach, increasing infrastructure spending, and protecting access to abortion. He would earn 10.3% of the vote in last place, behind Libertarian Norm Olsen and independent candidate Allison Madrigal.

Lastly, Stephen Fowler was the party's candidate for Larimer County Commissioner. Fowler, a farmer turned home builder, campaigned on "disciplined budgeting" and preventing any new expenses to the county budget. He would earn just 3.32% of the vote in a distant last place behind Republican Marc Roberson and the winning Democrat Shane Atkinson.

Colorado's 52nd state congressional district, 2026
Party	Candidate	Votes	%
Democratic	Yara Zokaie (incumbent)	22,888	71.7%
Center	Steve Yurash	9,038	28.3%
Total votes		31,926	100%

Colorado's 38th state congressional district, 2026
Party	Candidate	Votes	%
Democratic	Gretchen Rydin (incumbent)	24,091	64.1%
Libertarian	Norm Olsen	5,135	13.7%
Independent	Allison Madrigal	4,488	11.9%
Center	Tim Martin	3,892	10.3%
Total votes		37,606	100%

Larimer County Commissioner, 2026
Party	Candidate	Votes	%
Democratic	Shane Atkinson	83,760	61.84%
Republican	Marc Roberson	47,178	34.84%
Center	Stephen Fowler	4,509	3.32%
Total votes		135,447	100%

== Positions ==
The party's positions per their 2026 website are as follows:

- Restoring "civility" to politics
- Reducing taxing
- Stringently enforce existing immigration laws
- Reducing Crime
- Protecting access to abortion
- 2020 election integrity

== Gallery ==
The party's logo from 2022 to 2026
