= Alexander Winkler (politician) =

American politician

Member of the Colorado House of Representatives from the 34th district
- In office March 2018 – January 2019
- Preceded by: Steve Lebsock
- Succeeded by: Kyle Mullica

Personal details
- Party: Republican (until 2024); Colorado Center Party (since 2024)

Alexander Winkler is an American politician. A member of the Republican Party, he served in the Colorado House of Representatives from 2018 to 2019.

== Political career ==
Prior to his appointment Winkler was the vice-chairman of the Adams County Republican Party. In 2014 he ran against Steve Lebsock as the Republican nominee in the 34th district but lost. In 2016 Winkler launched an unsuccessful bid to run for Adams County Commissioner.

=== Colorado House of Representatives ===
Winkler was selected by the Colorado Republican Party to fill the vacancy of Lebsock, who despite being a Democrat was in the midst of a sexual harassment scandal and switched parties just before he was expelled from the House, the first time that has happened in Colorado in over 100 years. Since Lebsock was a Republican at the time of his expulsion, the Republicans selected his replacement. Winkler had already been running for the Republican nomination. Winkler would only hold office for a few months until the 2018 election where he was defeated soundly by Kyle Mullica 60.29% to 39.71%.

=== Center Party ===
Winkler joined a minor third party, the Colorado Center Party to attempt to run for the 34th district again during the 2024 elections, getting just 2.31% of the vote.

== Views ==
Winkler described himself as supporter of small government.
