= Donald Beezley =

American politician

Member of the Colorado House of Representatives from the 33rd district
- In office January 2011 – November 2012
- Preceded by: Dianne Primavera
- Succeeded by: Dianne Primavera

Personal details
- Party: Republican
- Spouse: Pat Beezley
- Profession: Businessman
- Website: donbeezley.com

Donald "Don" Beezley is a former state legislator in Colorado, serving from 2010 to 2012. He represented the 33rd district, centered on Broomfield, Colorado.

== Biography ==
=== Early life and education ===
Beezley earned his Bachelor of Science in finance from the University of Colorado Boulder. He went on to receive an Master of Arts in liberal studies from Regis University in 2006. Since 2002, Beezley has been the vice president of M&A ProForma West Limited, a mergers and acquisition firm. He has also worked as president of Tager Enterprises since 2005. He is the managing member of Health Source Regional Development LLC, a position he has held since 2007.

== Legislative career ==
=== 2010 election ===
Beezley ran against Democratic incumbent Dianne Primavera for the 33rd State House District seat, a legislative district which contained more registered Republicans than Democrats though was still considered a swing district. This race was among those targeted by Colorado Republicans hoping to make gains during the midterm 2010 legislative elections. Beezley narrowly unseated Primavera with 50.4% of the vote after receiving 314 more votes, one of the closest legislative races in the state. Beezley was sworn into office in January 2011.

=== 2011 legislative session ===
In the 2011 - 2012 legislative session, Beezley was appointed to the committees on Education and Finance.

=== 2012 election ===
In the 2012 general election, Representative Beezley announced, he would not seek re-election. Beezley's campaign was taken over by David Pigott who faced Democratic challenger Dianne Primavera. Primavera was elected by a margin of 50% to 44%.
