= Colorado's 33rd House of Representatives district =

American legislative district

Colorado's 33rd State House of Representatives district
Representative
Kenny Nguyen; D–Broomfield
- Demographics: 72% White; 1% Black; 15% Hispanic; 7% Asian; 0% Native American; 4% Multiracial
- Population (2024): 90,335

Colorado's 33rd House of Representatives district is one of 65 districts in the Colorado House of Representatives. It has been represented by Kenny Nguyen since 2026.
