= Kyle Mullica =

American politician from Colorado

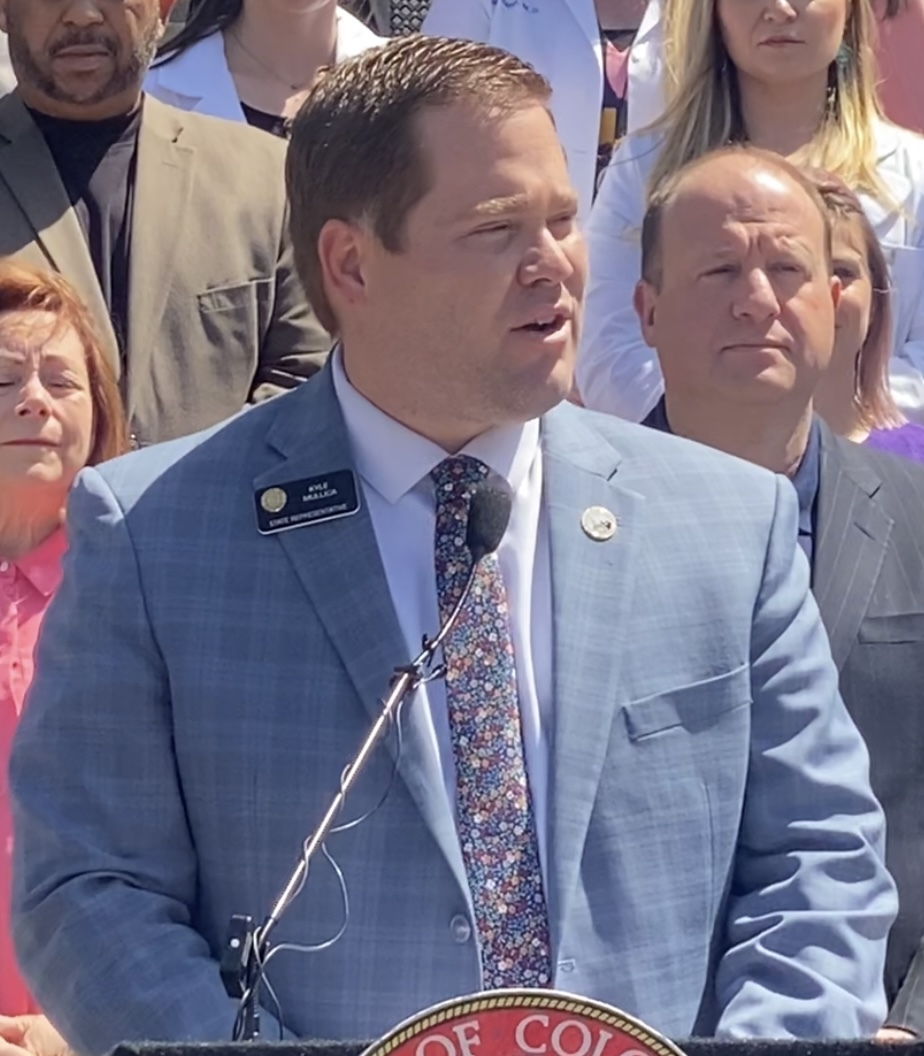

Member of the Colorado Senate from the 24th district
- Incumbent
- Assumed office January 9, 2023
- Preceded by: Faith Winter

Member of the Colorado House of Representatives from the 34th district
- In office January 4, 2019 – January 9, 2023
- Preceded by: Alexander Winkler
- Succeeded by: Jenny Willford

Personal details
- Born: Kyle Alan John Mullica; July 31, 1986 (age 39) Thornton, Colorado, U.S.
- Party: Democratic
- Spouse: Julie Duran
- Education: University of Denver (BS)

Kyle Alan John Mullica (born July 31, 1986) is an American politician who is a Democratic member of the Colorado Senate. He represents District 24, which includes the Adams County communities of Thornton, Federal Heights, Todd Creek and Northglenn. Previously, Mullica served in the Colorado House of Representatives and represented the 34th district in Adams County.

== Political career ==
=== Election ===
Mullica was elected in the general election on November 6, 2018, winning 60 percent of the vote over 40 percent of Republican candidate Alex Winkler.

=== State Senate candidacy ===
In November 2021, Mullica, an emergency room nurse, announced he was running for the open Senate District 24 seat that, after redistricting, will cover much of Adams County, including his hometown of Thornton. In the 2022 election, Mullica won the race with over 54% of the vote.

== Personal life ==
Mullica's wife, Julie Duran Mullica, was elected to represent District 1 of the Adams County, Colorado Board of County Commissioners in the 2024 general elections.

== Electoral history ==
2018 Colorado 34th House district election
Primary election
| Party | Candidate | Votes | % |
|---|---|---|---|
| Democratic | Kyle Mullica | 3,614 | 54.56% |
| Democratic | Jacque Phillips | 3,010 | 45.44% |
| Total votes | | 6,624 | 100.00% |
General election
| Democratic | Kyle Mullica | 16,039 | 60.29% |
| Republican | Alexander Winkler | 10,565 | 39.71% |
| Total votes | | 26,604 | 100.00% |

2020 Colorado 34th House district election
Primary election
| Party | Candidate | Votes | % |
|---|---|---|---|
| Democratic | Kyle Mullica (incumbent) | 8,667 | 100.00% |
| Total votes | | 8,667 | 100.00% |
General election
| Democratic | Kyle Mullica (incumbent) | 19,845 | 56.22% |
| Republican | Mark Bromley | 13,694 | 38.79% |
| Libertarian | Rob Stutz | 1,760 | 4.99% |
| Total votes | | 35,299 | 100.00% |

2022 Colorado 24th Senate district election
Primary election
| Party | Candidate | Votes | % |
|---|---|---|---|
| Democratic | Kyle Mullica | 11,565 | 100.00% |
| Total votes | | 11,565 | 100.00% |
General election
| Democratic | Kyle Mullica | 30,008 | 53.82% |
| Republican | Courtney Potter | 24,184 | 43.37% |
| Libertarian | Donald Osborn | 1,569 | 2.81% |
| Total votes | | 55,761 | 100.00% |
