= William Lindstedt =

American politician

Member of the Colorado Senate
- Incumbent
- Assumed office January 5, 2026
- Preceded by: Faith Winter
- Constituency: 25th district

Member of the Colorado House of Representatives from the 33rd district
- In office January 9, 2023 – December 23, 2025
- Preceded by: Matt Gray
- Succeeded by: Kenny Nguyen

Personal details
- Born: 1992 or 1993 (age 32–33)
- Party: Democratic
- Spouse: Bria
- Education: Bachelor of Arts in political science
- Alma mater: University of Colorado at Denver

William Lindstedt (born 1992 or 1993) is an American politician who has served as a member of the Colorado State Senate since December 30, 2025 when he was appointed by Governor Jared Polis. He represents Colorado's 24th district. He was selected to fill the vacancy left by the death of his predecessor Faith Winter. Prior to being appointed to the Senate, Lindstedt served in the Colorado House of Representatives from January 9, 2023 to December 23, 2025. He represented Colorado's 33rd House district. He has also been a member of the Broomfield city council.

== Electoral history ==
He was elected on November 8, 2022, in the 2022 Colorado House of Representatives election against Republican opponent Stacie Dougherty. He assumed office on January 9, 2023.

He was selected by a vacancy committee on December 23, 2025, to fill a vacancy in the Colorado Senate from District 24. However, the vacancy committee did not submit the required certification paperwork to the Colorado Secretary of State’s Office within the 30-day period mandated by state law. Under Colorado statute, when a vacancy committee fails to certify a selection within the required timeframe, the Governor of Colorado is required to make the appointment within five days of the deadline. Governor Jared Polis subsequently appointed Lindstedt to the seat, consistent with the vacancy committee’s recommendation.

== Biography ==
Lindstedt earned a Bachelor of Arts in political science from the University of Colorado at Denver.

Colorado Senate
Preceded by Faith Winter	Member of the Colorado Senate; 2025–present	Succeeded by incumbent
Colorado House of Representatives
Preceded by Matt Gray	Member of the Colorado House of Representatives; 2023–2025	Succeeded by vacant
