= Matt Gray (politician) =

American politician (born 1980)

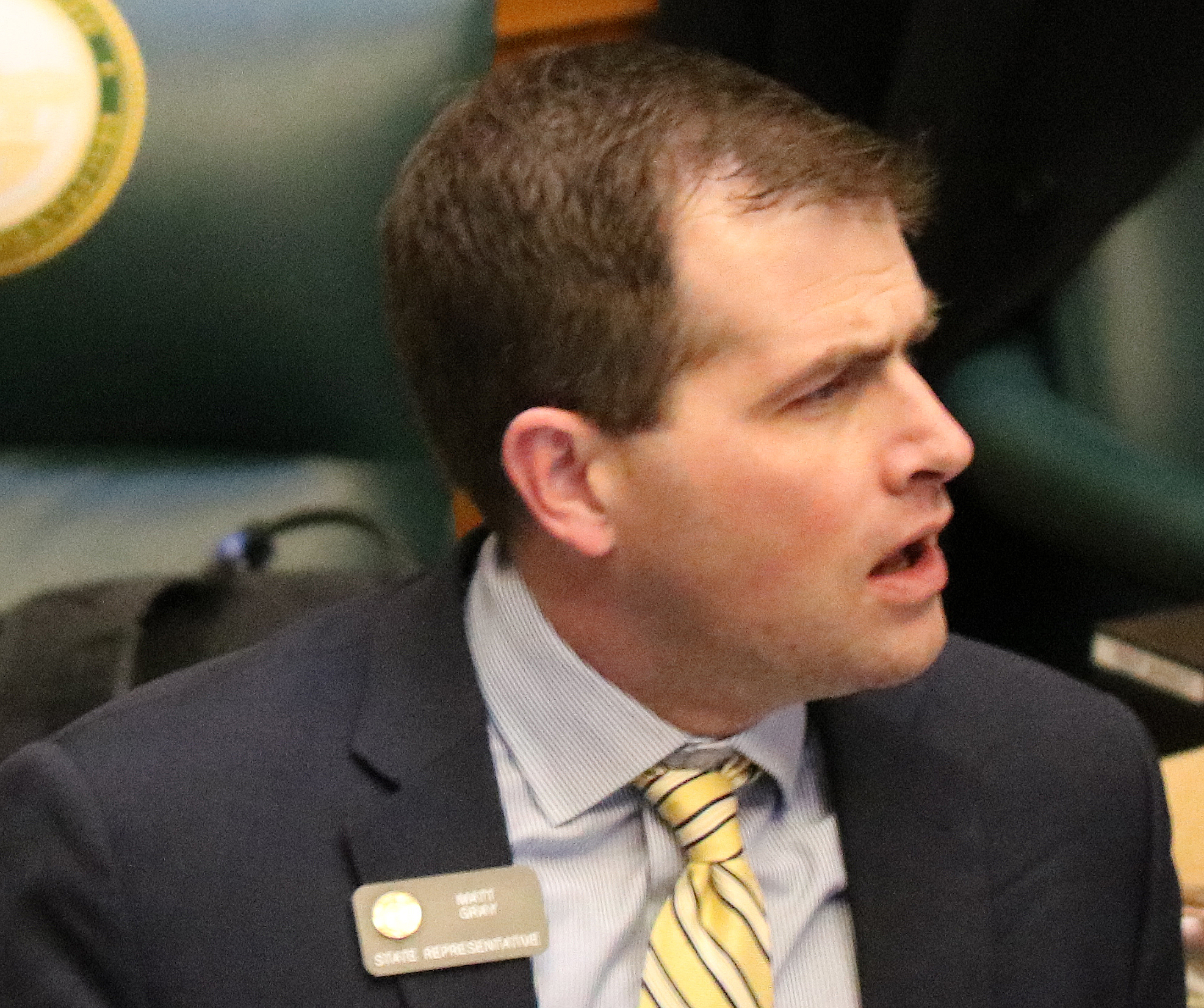
- Gray in 2020

Member of the Colorado House of Representatives from the 33rd district
- In office January 11, 2017 – January 9, 2023
- Preceded by: Dianne Primavera
- Succeeded by: William Lindstedt

Personal details
- Born: September 25, 1980 (age 46) Broomfield, Colorado
- Party: Democratic

Matt Gray (born September 25, 1980) is a former Democratic member of the Colorado House of Representatives. Gray represented District 33, which covered Broomfield and portions of Boulder County. He was first elected in 2016, succeeding Dianne Primavera.

A Broomfield resident, Gray was a deputy district attorney before taking office. He has also served as vice chair of the Adams County Youth Initiative and chair of the Broomfield Board of Equalization.

Gray served on the House Business Affairs and Labor Committee, the House Finance Committee, and the House Local Government Committee.

== Elections ==
Gray was elected to the House of Representatives in 2016, winning with 52.16% against Republican opponent Karen Nelson.

== DUI arrest ==
Gray was arrested on April 21, 2022, on suspicion of driving under the influence. Gray was picking up his children, and the arrest took place in front of their elementary school in Broomfield. Gray is a former prosecutor in Colorado's 17th judicial district, the district in which the arrest occurred.

Police were called by school officials concerned about Gray's behavior and an odor of alcohol emanating from him. Gray refused to perform field sobriety tests or blood alcohol level tests. Gray denied he was drunk, claiming that he instead was experiencing the effects of anxiety and depression. Gray later pleaded guilty to one count DUI with one year of probation and suspension of driver's license for refusal to blow or provide a blood sample.

He announced that he would not seek re-election in 2022.

== Personal life ==
Gray was engaged to marry Faith Winter, another Colorado politician. Winter died in a traffic accident in 2025.
