= Alice Nichol =

American politician in Colorado

Alice J. Nichol is a former state legislator and county commissioner in Colorado. She represented Adams County in the Colorado House of Representatives and the Colorado Senate. She campaigned in 1998 and 2002 for a state senate seat. She is a Democrat.

Payments and contracts she was involved with as county commissioner were controversial. After she was investigated she quit the Democratic Party, criticizing state leaders for how they treated her.
