= Colorado's 24th Senate district =

American legislative district

Colorado's 24th State Senate district
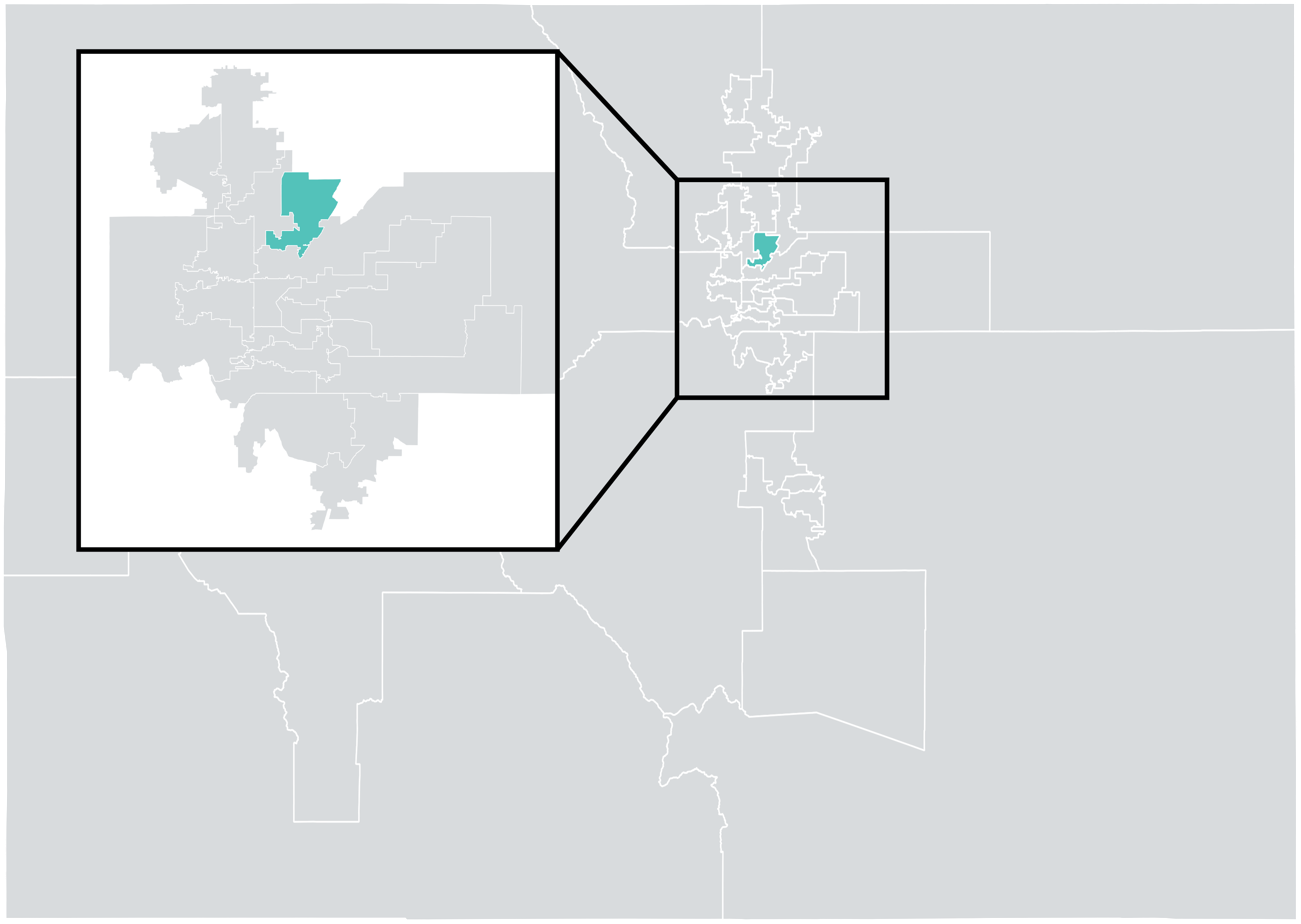
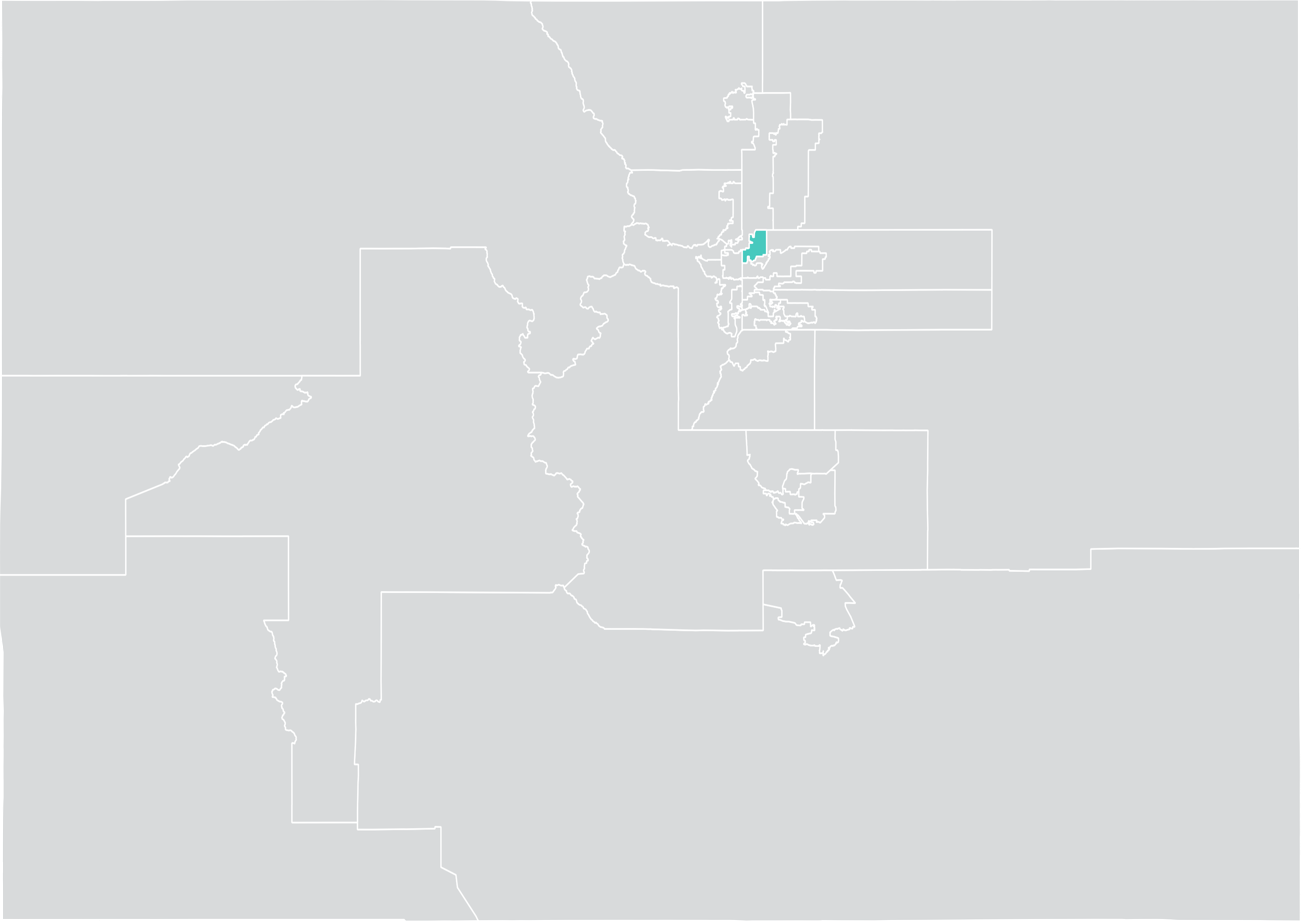
Senator
Kyle Mullica; D–Northglenn
- Registration: 26.8% Democratic; 20.2% Republican; 50.3% No party preference
- Demographics: 65% White; 2% Black; 26% Hispanic; 4% Asian; 2% Other
- Population (2018): 163,999
- Registered voters: 109,248

Colorado's 24th Senate district is one of 35 districts in the Colorado Senate. It has been represented by Democrat Kyle Mullica since 2023. Prior to redistricting the district was represented by Democrat Faith Winter and Republican Beth Martinez Humenik.

== Geography ==
District 24 covers the northern suburbs of Denver in Adams County, including most of Northglenn and parts of Thornton and Westminster.

The district overlaps with Colorado's 6th and 7th congressional districts, and with the 31st, 34th, 35th, and 56th districts of the Colorado House of Representatives.

== Recent election results ==
Colorado state senators are elected to staggered four-year terms; under normal circumstances, the 24th district holds elections in midterm years. The 2022 election will be the first held under the state's new district lines.

=== 2022 ===
Thanks to redistricting, Senator Faith Winter is running for re-election in the 25th district in 2022, and State Rep. Kyle Mullica is running for the 24th district in her stead.

2022 Colorado State Senate election, District 24
Party	Candidate	Votes	%
Democratic	Kyle Mullica	30,008	53.8
Republican	Courtney Potter	24,184	43.4
Libertarian	Donald Osborn	1,569	2.8
Total votes		55,761	100

== Historical election results ==
=== 2018 ===
2018 Colorado State Senate election, District 24
Party	Candidate	Votes	%
Democratic	Faith Winter	35,578	52.3
Republican	Beth Martinez Humenik (incumbent)	27,068	39.8
Independent	Adam Matkowsky	3,328	4.9
Libertarian	Donald Osborn	2,033	3.0
Total votes		68,007	100
Democratic gain from Republican			

=== 2014 ===
2014 Colorado State Senate election, District 24
Party	Candidate	Votes	%
Republican	Beth Martinez Humenik	26,164	50.9
Democratic	Judith Anne Solano	25,268	49.1
Total votes		51,432	100
Republican gain from Democratic			

=== Federal and statewide results ===
Year	Office	Results
2020	President	Biden 56 – 41.0%
2018	Governor	Polis 53.8 – 41.8%
2016	President	Clinton 48.0 – 43.0%
2014	Senate	Gardner 47.4 – 46.1%
2014	Governor	Hickenlooper 48.9 – 46.3%
2012	President	Obama 53.3 – 44.2%
