= William W. Howland =

American politician

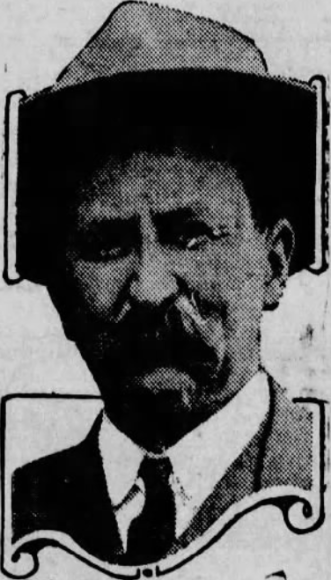
- Howland in 1915

Member of the Colorado House of Representatives
- In office January 1915 – March 15, 1915

Personal details
- Party: Republican

William W. Howland was an American politician. A member of the Republican Party, he served in the Colorado House of Representatives in 1915.

On March 15, 1915, Howland was expelled from the House by a unanimous vote of 60-0 after a report found that Howland committed perjury and lied to the House about a bribery charge.
