= Dianne Primavera =

American politician (born 1950)

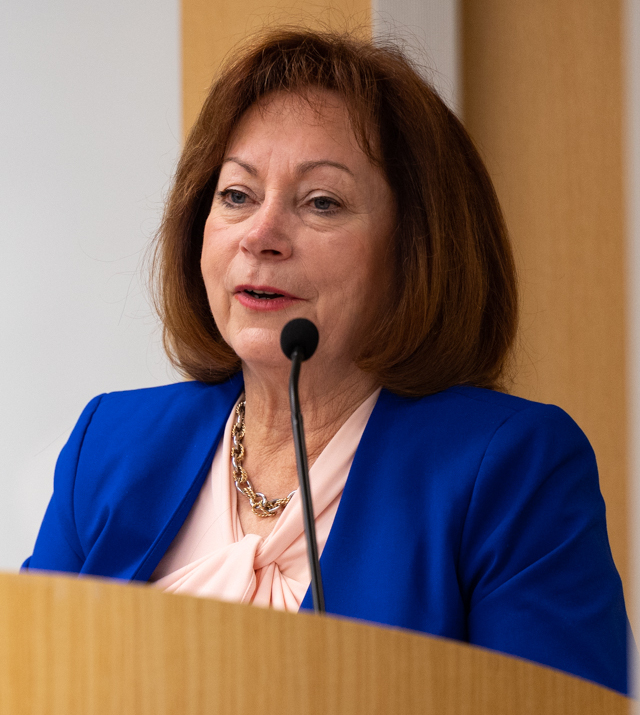
- Primavera in 2022

50th Lieutenant Governor of Colorado
- Incumbent
- Assumed office January 8, 2019
- Governor: Jared Polis
- Preceded by: Donna Lynne

Member of the Colorado House of Representatives from the 33rd district
- In office January 9, 2013 – January 11, 2017
- Preceded by: Donald Beezley
- Succeeded by: Matt Gray
- In office January 10, 2007 – January 12, 2011
- Preceded by: William Berens
- Succeeded by: Donald Beezley

Personal details
- Born: January 28, 1950 (age 76) Denver, Colorado, U.S.
- Party: Democratic
- Children: 2
- Education: Regis University (BS); University of Northern Colorado (MS)
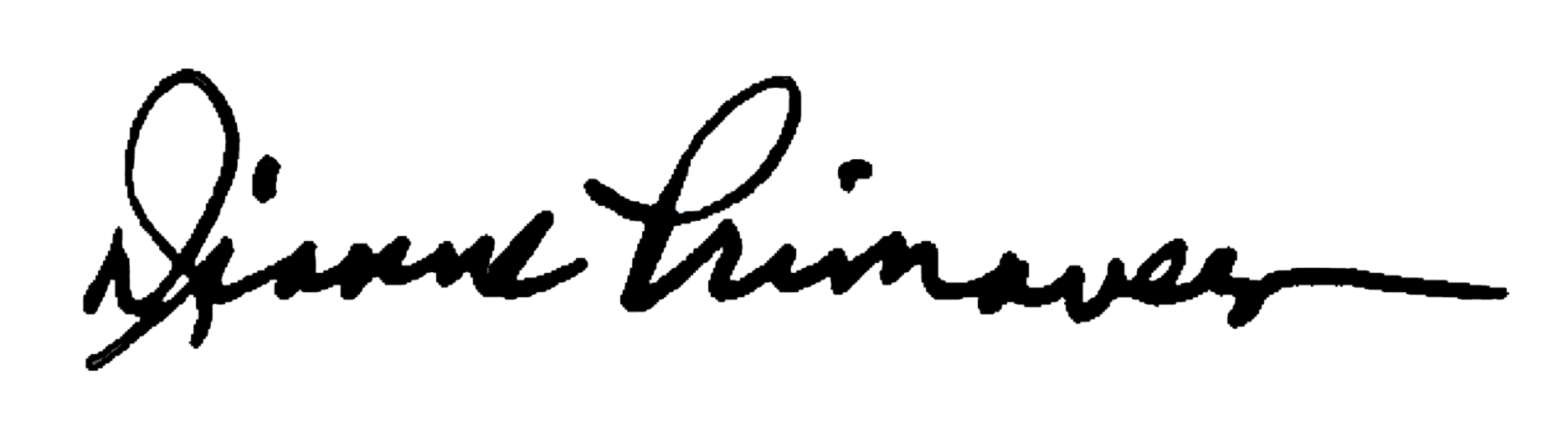
- Signature

Dianne I. Primavera (born January 28, 1950) is an American politician who has been the 50th lieutenant governor of Colorado since 2019. A member of the Democratic Party, she previously served as the Colorado State Representative for the 33rd district from 2007 to 2011, and again from 2013 to 2017. Democratic gubernatorial nominee Jared Polis selected Primavera as his running mate, in the 2018 Colorado gubernatorial election.

A vocational counselor and government manager, Primavera was first elected to the Colorado House of Representatives in 2006, after an unsuccessful campaign in 2004. She represented House District 33, centered around Broomfield, Colorado.

In the legislature, Primavera focused heavily on health care issues. After two years out of politics, Primavera was once again elected to the statehouse in the 2012 election. She was reelected in 2014 and did not seek reelection in 2016.

== Early life and education ==
Born in Denver, Colorado, Primavera earned a bachelor's degree in psychology from Regis University in 1972 and a master's degree in vocational rehabilitation counseling from the University of Northern Colorado in 1975. She began her career as a case manager for the Weld County Community Center Board. She later was employed as a vocational rehabilitation counselor for the Colorado Department of Social Services, and rose to become a supervisor in the Division of Vocational Rehabilitation.

== Early career ==
In 1990, Primavera joined the Rocky Mountain Regional Brain Injury Center as Education & Training Coordinator. In 1994, she was hired as a customer service manager for the Colorado Department of Health Care Policy and Financing, a job she held until 2001. She joined the Colorado Department of Revenue in 2001, working as a director first in the Titles and Registration division, and then in Emissions and Constituent Relations from 2003 through 2004.

Primavera was the conference director for the White House Conference on Aging, working with the Division of Aging and Adult Services in the Colorado Department of Human Services.

She was appointed by Gov. Bill Owens to the Independent Living Council, and has been a member of State Workers Advocating for the Youth and the Medicaid Advisory Committee for Persons with Disabilities.

At the time of her election to the state legislature, she was program director for Learning Services Corp. Primavera has also operated a small dog-grooming business since her teenage years.

After losing reelection in 2010, Primavera served on the 17th Judicial District's Victim & Witness Assistance and Law Enforcement board as well as on the board of Susan G. Komen for the Cure. She returned to managing a small business she has run since being a teenager.

== Colorado House of Representatives ==
Rep. Primavera represented House District 33 including Broomfield, Superior and part of Erie. She was elected to represent House District 33 in 2006 and 2008 and again in 2012 and 2014.

=== Elections ===
2004

After being elected secretary of the Boulder County Democratic Party in 2003, Primavera campaigned for the state legislature against Republican Bill Berens in 2004, losing with 47% of the popular vote.

2006

She challenged Berens in 2006. Primavera received roughly $60,000 in campaign donations, outraising Berens by about two to one. Playing off her name, one of her fundraisers was titled "Pasta and Primavera", and she would sometimes distribute her father's pasta primavera recipe along with campaign literature to help voters remember her name. She prevailed in the general election with just over 51 percent support, winning by slightly less than 1000 votes. Because of the close margin, the winner of the race was not known until several days after the polls closed.

2008

Primavera filed to run for a second term in 2007; Republican Nick Kliebenstein announced his bid to seek Primavera's seat in July of that year. In a district closely balanced between Republicans and Democrats, the race between Primavera and Kliebenstein was targeted by both major parties, although by late summer 2008, Primavera had outraised Kliebenstein by roughly three to one. Her fundraising advantage continued through October, by which time she had raised over $100,000 to Kliebenstein's $30,000.

During the campaign, Primavera pledged to continue her work in the area of health care reform, while Kliebenstein criticized Primavera for her support of a property tax freeze, and contrasted his support for dedicated highway funding and oil exploration with Primavera's emphasis on mass transit and alternative energy sources. Primavera's re-election bid was endorsed by The Denver Post the Boulder Daily Camera, the Windsor Beacon, the Broomfield Enterprise, and the Boulder Weekly. Primavera won re-election, defeating Kliebenstein by several thousand votes, or 56 percent of ballots cast, a greater margin than her first election win in 2006.

2010

Primavera's district, which contained more registered Republicans than Democrats, was one of those targeted by Colorado Republicans hoping to make gains during the midterm 2010 legislative elections. Her Republican opponent, Donald Beezley, narrowly unseated Primavera with 50.4% of the vote after receiving 314 more votes.

2012

In 2012, Primavera announced she would seek election the House district 33 seat she held through 2010. Donald Beezley, her one-time Republican opponent and the incumbent, announced his resignation from the legislature. The Republicans selected David Pigott to face Primavera in the November election. In the 2012 General Election, Pigott faced Primavera. The campaign included extensive early fundraising and a considerable get out the vote push. She defeated Pigott by a margin of 50% to 44%, with the remainder going to third-party candidates.

=== Tenure ===
2007

In the 2007 session of the Colorado General Assembly, Primavera sat on the House Health and Human Services Committee and the House Transportation and Energy Committee.

Among Primavera's first bills were measures intended to improve patient safety by addressing mistakes made in health care administration, to revise obsolete statutes pertaining to the Colorado Department of Revenue, to regulate movers and to increase funding for health clinics. A cancer survivor, Primavera introduced legislation to establish a Colorado Breast and Women's Reproductive Cancers Fund and a donation checkoff on Colorado income tax forms for the fund, to be administered by the Colorado Cancer Coalition. She supported an unsuccessful bill to require cervical cancer vaccinations, and later introduced another bill, that was signed into law, to create a public awareness program for cervical cancer vaccinations, and require that Medicaid and private health insurance cover the costs of the vaccine. The bill also used tobacco settlement money to create a fund to provide the vaccine to underinsured women.

Primavera also sponsored a successful bill to require that minors be required to wear helmets while riding motorcycles, which passed despite strong opposition from House Republicans. During the session, she was one of only a few Democrats to oppose a controversial plan by Governor Bill Ritter to freeze property tax rates to increase public school funding.

In her first legislative session, Primavera introduced 13 bills, 11 of which were signed into law. For her work on health care issues, Primavera was given the Colorado Lawmaker Award by the Colorado Women's Chamber of Commerce and the Denver Women's Commission. Following the legislative session, Primavera sat on the interim Transportation Legislation Review Committee.

2008

In the 2008 session of the Colorado General Assembly, Primavera sat on the House Health and Human Services Committee and the House Transportation and Energy Committee. In February 2008, Primavera was unanimously elected vice-chair of the Legislative Audit Committee.

Primavera sponsored legislation to alter the process for criminal offenders' designation as a "sexually violent predator;" under her proposal, only judges, rather than parole boards, would be able to apply the designation. She also sponsored legislation to create a tax checkoff for the Adult Stem Cells Cure Fund, designed to promote umbilical cord blood donations. Primavera was also the House sponsor of legislation to create the Colorado Autism Commission, legislation to require that health insurance the terms, costs, and benefits of their insurance plans on a public website, and legislation to earmark some tax revenues from gambling to gambling addiction prevention and counseling.

2009

For the 2009 legislative session, Primavera was named to seats on the House Health and Human Services Committee and the House Transportation and Energy Committee, and was tapped to chair the Legislative Audit Committee. Following her re-election, Primavera stated that her legislative agenda for the 2009 session would focus on transportation and health care, including legislation to prevent insurance companies them from denying coverage for cancer patients participating in clinical trials, legislation that was signed into law. Privavera sponsored a bill to dedicate funds from purchases of Colorado's "Committed to a Cure" breast cancer awareness special license plate towards cancer treatment; the legislation led the original creators of the license plate to pull the original design from use, as they claimed the bill altered the mission of the plate; a new design will be created.

For her work on health care legislation, Primavera was named a Community Health Champion by the Colorado Community Health Network in February 2009, and was honored with the Legislative Leadership Award by the American Cancer Society's Cancer Action Network, and honored by the Brain Injury Association of Colorado later in the year.

2010

For the 2010 legislation session, Primavera relinquished the chair of the Legislative Audit Committee to Sen. David Schultheis.

Prior to the 2010 General Assembly session, Primavera announced plans to introduce legislation to shorten the time in which banks could foreclose on abandoned homes from four months to two months.

2013

Rep. Primavera sponsored a bipartisan bill extending the Colorado job growth incentive tax credit which rewards Colorado businesses for creating jobs and helps attract new businesses to the state. She also sponsored a bill allowing a nurse or qualified individual to administer an epi-pen to a student suffering anaphylactic shock.

2014

In the most recent session Rep. Primavera sponsored legislation extending the Breast and Cervical Cancer Treatment and Prevention program through 2019. She also sponsored a bipartisan bill creating a tax break for small businesses with less than $15,000 in business personal property.

== Lieutenant Governor of Colorado ==
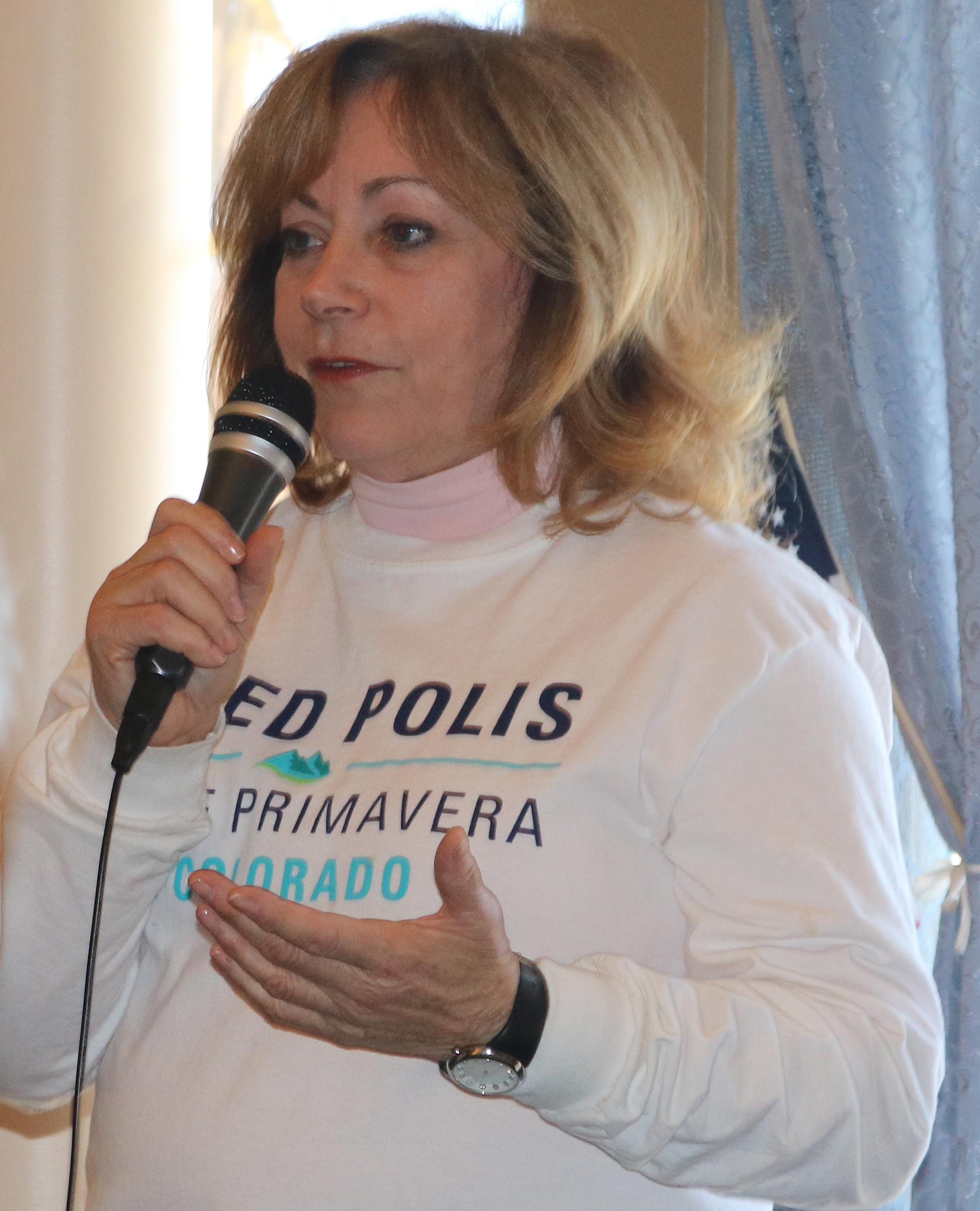
Primavera in October 2018

=== Elections ===
==== 2018 ====
On June 26, U.S. Representative Jared Polis defeated former State Treasurer Cary Kennedy and former State Senator Mike Johnston in the Democratic primary for the 2018 Colorado gubernatorial election. Polis received 44.4% of the vote.

On July 2, 2018, Polis picked Primavera as his running mate. On November 6, 2018, Polis and Primavera defeated the Republican ticket of State Treasurer Walker Stapleton and State Representative Lang Sias, receiving 53.4% of the vote.

==== 2022 ====
On November 8, 2022, Primavera and Polis won re-election to a second term, defeating Republicans Heidi Ganahl and Danny Moore, receiving 58.5% of the vote.

== Personal life ==
In 1988, Primavera was diagnosed with breast cancer and given less than 5 years to live by physicians. She was also diagnosed with cervical cancer in 1992 and has survived a total of four bouts with cancer and has participated in the American Cancer Society's Relay for Life.

Primavera, a resident of Broomfield, Colorado, has been a member of the Broomfield Health and Human Services Advisory Committee, the 17th Judicial District's Crime Victim Compensation Board, Denver Public Schools Special Education Advisory Committee, and the boards of the Susan M. Duncan Family YMCA and Chester House.

Party political offices
Preceded by Joe Garcia	Democratic nominee for Lieutenant Governor of Colorado; 2018, 2022	Most recent
Political offices
Preceded by Donna Lynne	Lieutenant Governor of Colorado; 2019–present	Incumbent
