= Beth Martinez Humenik =

American politician

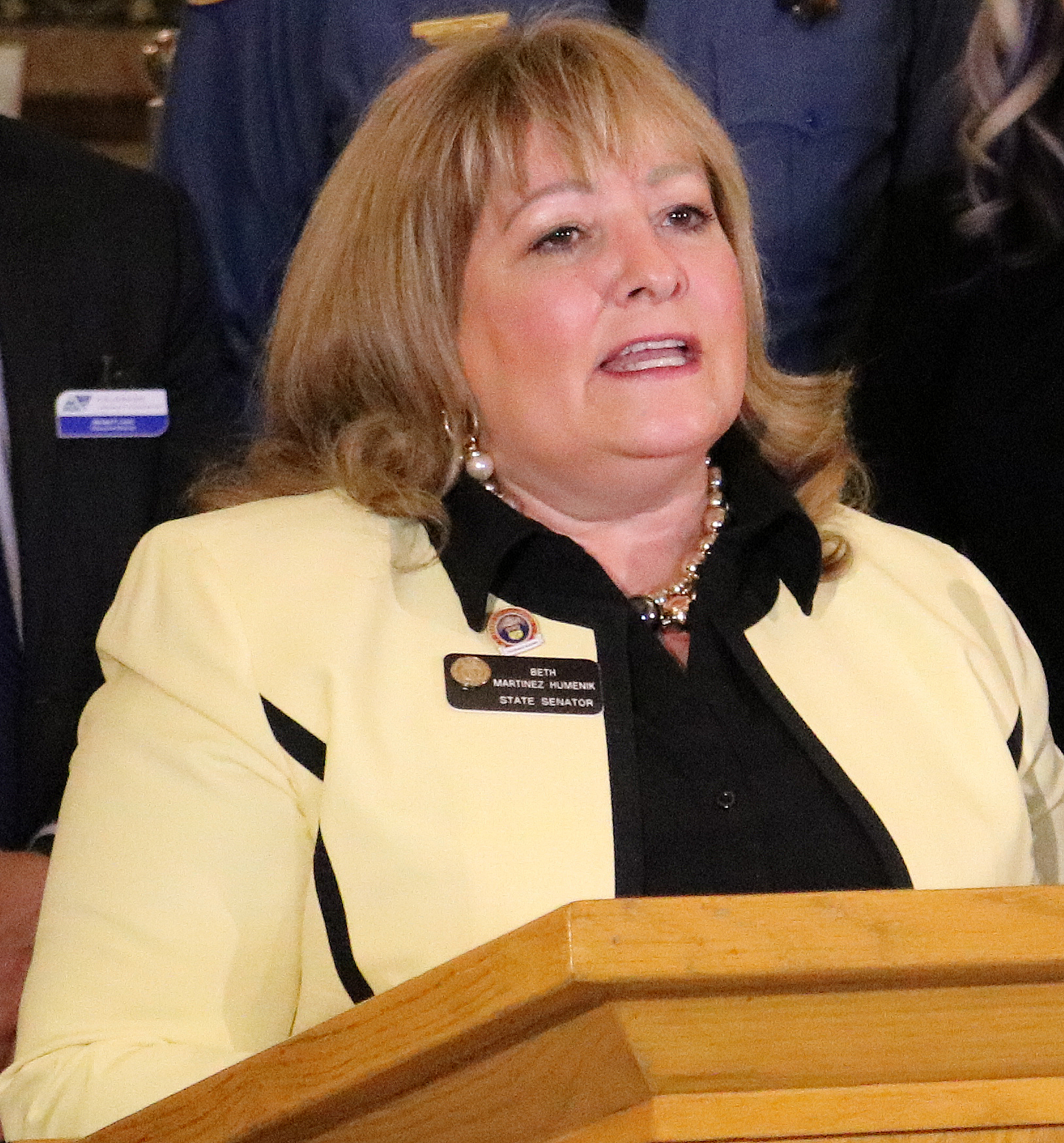

Member of the Colorado Senate from the 24th district
- In office January 7, 2015 – January 4, 2019
- Preceded by: Lois Tochtrop
- Succeeded by: Faith Winter

Personal details
- Party: Republican
- Education: Colorado State University

Beth Martinez Humenik is an American politician who served in the Colorado State Senate from the 24th district as a member of the Republican Party from 2015 to 2019.

== Early life ==
Beth Martinez Humenik was born to Joe and Sandy Martinez and grew up in Fort Collins, Colorado. She graduated from Colorado State University with bachelor and master's degrees. She married Mike in 1988, and moved to Thornton, Colorado, in 1996. She is related to former state senator Bob Martinez.

== Career ==
=== Local politics ===
Humenik was a member of the Thorton city council from the 3rd district from 2007 to 2015, and SomXai Vue was selected to replace her after she resigned to take up a seat in the Colorado State Senate. She announced on September 5, 2019, that she run for mayor of Thornton, but placed third out of five candidates.

=== State legislature ===
During Humenik's tenure in the state senate she served as chair of the Local Government and Joint Technology committees. She was vice chair of the Health and Human Services committee. She was a member of the executive committee of the National Hispanic Caucus of State Legislators. In 2015, she was the only Hispanic Republican in the state senate.

In 2018, Humenik filed a complain against state senator Daniel Kagan for using a women's bathroom multiple times and Kagan resigned after a report on his usage of a women's bathroom was released. She voted against expelling state senator Randy Baumgardner in 2018.

In 2012, Humenik received the Republican nomination for a seat in the Colorado House of Representatives from the 31st district, but lost to Democratic nominee Joe Salazar. She defeated Democratic nominee Judy Solano in the 2014 election for a seat in the state senate from the 24th district. She was a Republican that represented a district won by Hillary Clinton in the 2016 presidential election. Democratic nominee Faith Winter defeated her in the 2018 election.

== Political positions ==
Humenik voted against legislation that would require doctors to show ultrasound images to women seeking abortions. She was endorsed by the Log Cabin Republicans in 2018. She was given a score of 43% by the AFL-CIO in 2018. She was given a F rating by NARAL.

== Electoral history ==
2012 Colorado House of Representatives 31st district election
Primary election
Party	Candidate	Votes	%
Republican	Beth Martinez Humenik	2,025	100.00%
Total votes		2,025	100.00%
General election
Democratic	Joe Salazar	18,800	60.45%
Republican	Beth Martinez Humenik	12,301	39.55%
Total votes		31,101	100.00%

2014 Colorado Senate 24th district election
Primary election
Party	Candidate	Votes	%
Republican	Beth Martinez Humenik	6,605	100.00%
Total votes		6,605	100.00%
General election
Republican	Beth Martinez Humenik	26,164	50.87%
Democratic	Judy Solano	25,268	49.13%
Total votes		51,432	100.00%

2018 Colorado Senate 24th district election
Primary election
Party	Candidate	Votes	%
Republican	Beth Martinez Humenik (incumbent)	9,401	100.00%
Total votes		9,401	100.00%
General election
Democratic	Faith Winter	35,578	52.32%
Republican	Beth Martinez Humenik (incumbent)	27,068	39.80%
Independent	Adam Matkowsky	3,328	4.89%
Libertarian	Donald Osborn	2,033	2.99%
Total votes		68,007	100.00%

== Works cited ==
=== Election data ===
- "2012 Abstract of Votes Cast" (PDF). Secretary of State of Colorado.
- "2014 Republican Primary State Senate District 24". Secretary of State of Colorado.
- "2014 State Senate District 24 election". Secretary of State of Colorado.
- "2018 Republican Primary State Senate District 24". Secretary of State of Colorado.
- "2018 State Senate District 24 election". Secretary of State of Colorado.

=== Newspapers ===
- "Abortion waiting period bill nixed". Fort Collins Coloradoan. April 14, 2017. p. 2A – via Newspapers.com.
- "Applause". Fort Collins Coloradoan. January 18, 2015. p. D2 – via Newspapers.com.
- "Latino: Legislator upset by racial overtones of comment". The Daily Sentinel. February 16, 2017. p. 7A – via Newspapers.com.
- Lieb, David (September 23, 2018). "Control of Congress also at stake in legislative races". The Commercial Appeal. p. 15A – via Newspapers.com.

=== News websites ===
- "Beth Martinez Humenik Running for Thornton Mayor". The Denver Post. September 10, 2019. Archived from the original on December 23, 2024.
- "Colorado Senate District 24 candidate Q&A". The Denver Post. October 10, 2018. Archived from the original on May 9, 2022.
- "Democratic State Sen. Daniel Kagan Resigns From Colorado Legislature". Colorado Public Radio. December 6, 2018. Archived from the original on January 28, 2025.
- "Thornton's Ward 3 councilman sworn in". Colorado Community Media. January 27, 2015. Archived from the original on January 28, 2025.
- Bunch, Joey (March 10, 2017). "Rep. Joe Salazar announces run for Colorado attorney general". Colorado Politics. Archived from the original on January 28, 2025.
- Bunch, Joey (April 2, 2018). "Sen. Randy Baumgardner prevails in Senate vote on expulsion". Colorado Politics. Archived from the original on January 30, 2025.
- Goodland, Marianne (August 16, 2018). "AFL-CIO's legislative scorecard: Dems do well; Republicans, not so much". Colorado Politics. Archived from the original on January 30, 2025.
- Luning, Ernest (September 5, 2019). "Former state Sen. Beth Martinez Humenik launches bid to be Thornton mayor". Colorado Politics. Archived from the original on December 11, 2024.
- Luning, Ernest (October 10, 2018). "Police, rapper weigh in on CD7 contest". Colorado Politics. Archived from the original on January 30, 2025.
- Powell, Erin; Zelinger, Marshall (September 21, 2018). "Male senator used women's bathroom in Colorado capitol three times, investigators find". KUSA.
- Tomasic, John (October 22, 2015). "Republicans celebrate Hispanic heritage, court Colorado's crucial Latino vote". Colorado Politics. Archived from the original on January 28, 2025.

=== Web ===
- "Beth Martinez Humenik". Reproductive Freedom for All. Archived from the original on December 5, 2021.
- Freeman, Duranya (September 26, 2018). "Sen. Beth Martinez-Humenik: A Champion of Economic Justice". Colorado Center on Law and Policy. Archived from the original on May 20, 2024.
