= Faith Winter =

American politician (1980–2025)

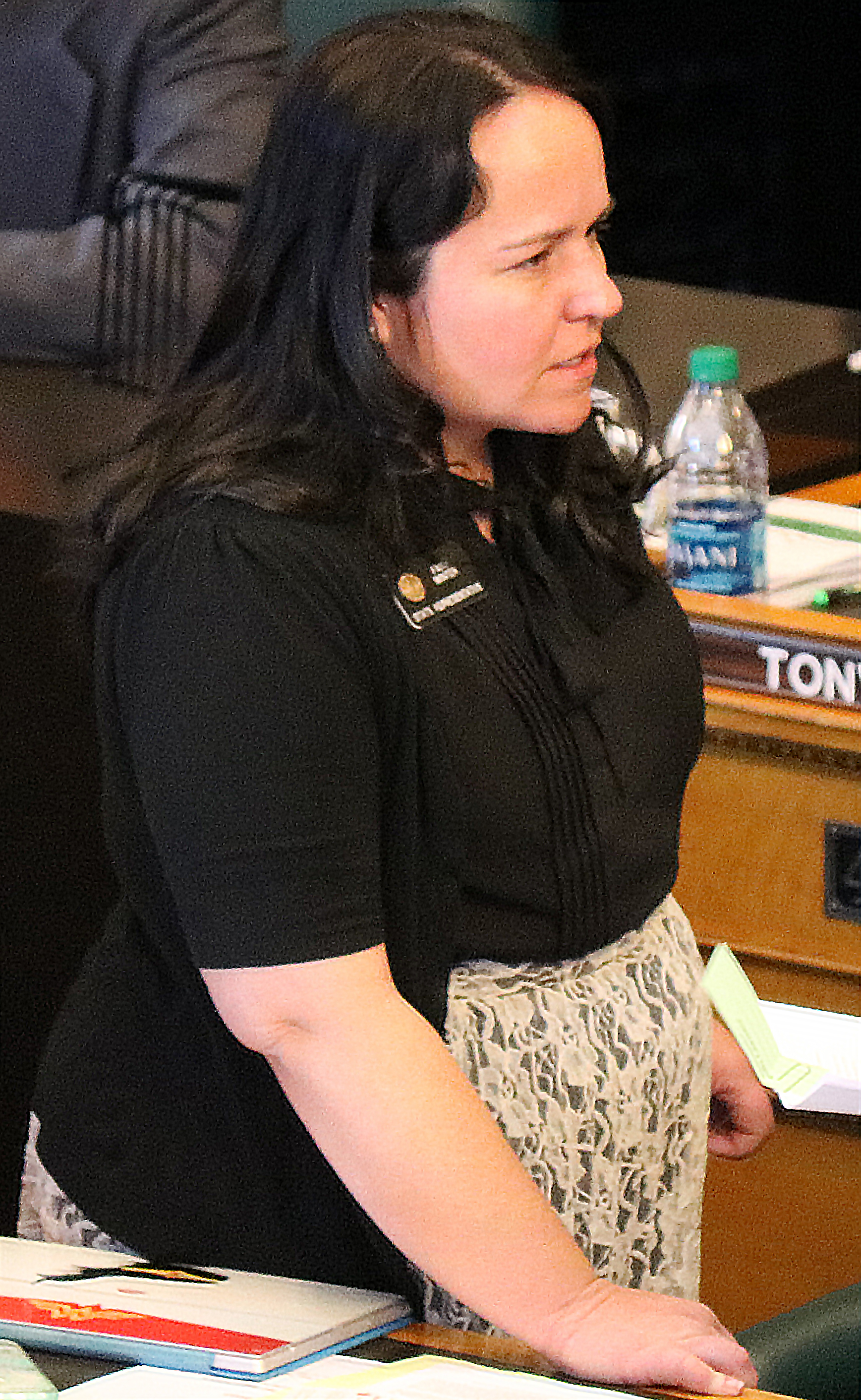
- Winter in 2018

Member of the Colorado Senate
- In office January 4, 2019 – November 26, 2025
- Preceded by: Beth Martinez Humenik
- Succeeded by: William Lindstedt
- Constituency: 24th district (2019–2023); 25th district (2023–2025)

Member of the Colorado House of Representatives from the 35th district
- In office January 7, 2015 – January 4, 2019
- Preceded by: Cherylin Peniston
- Succeeded by: Shannon Bird

Personal details
- Born: May 7, 1980 Littleton, Colorado, U.S.
- Died: November 26, 2025 (aged 45) Centennial, Colorado, U.S.
- Cause of death: Multi-car crash
- Party: Democratic
- Spouse: Mark Snook (div.)
- Domestic partner: Matt Gray
- Children: 2
- Education: University of Redlands (BS)

Faith Winter (May 7, 1980 – November 26, 2025) was an American politician from the state of Colorado. A member of the Democratic Party, she represented District 25 in the Colorado State Senate, representing portions of Adams County, the City and County of Broomfield, and Weld County, including the communities of Broomfield, Westminster, Northglenn, and Shaw Heights. Prior to 2023, she represented District 24. During the 2020 reapportionment process, her residence moved from Senate District 24 to Senate District 25.

Winter was first elected to the state senate in 2018. She served in the Colorado House of Representatives from 2014 to 2019, representing Colorado House District 35. On September 8, 2023, Winter was elected assistant majority leader of the Colorado Senate. On November 26, 2025, Winter died in a multi-car accident on Interstate 25 in Centennial, Colorado, that injured three other drivers.

== Education and early career ==
Winter attended the University of Redlands in Redlands, California, where she majored in Environmental Management and minored in Biology. Winter was the National Program Director for EnviroCitizen, National Field Director for The White House Project, executive director for Emerge Colorado, and Program Director for Colorado Conservation Voters.

== Political career ==
From 2007 to 2014, Winter served as a member in the Westminster city council. Winter was elected in 2014 and then re-elected in 2016 to represent House District 35. In 2018, She decided to run against incumbent Republican Beth Martinez Humenik for the state Senate. The district was deemed as one of the most competitive seats that would determine whether Democrats would be able to regain control of the state Senate. Winter was termed as one of the "Fab Five" in reference to a group of Democratic women challenging or defending competitive seats seen as vital to which party would hold control of the Senate. Winter ultimately won by a significant margin. She was re-elected in 2022.

On April 4, 2024, Colorado Politics reported that Winter was checking into an alcohol rehabilitation facility, following multiple reports that she appeared intoxicated at a Northglenn city council meeting the previous evening. Prior to this event, she had been observed falling down several times at the Colorado Senate. The Northglenn city council subsequently filed an ethics complaint against Winter, where individual members of the city council noted that Winter was intoxicated at meetings prior to the April 3, 2024, city council meeting. As a result, the Colorado Senate convened an ethics committee to review the allegations.

On July 8, 2024, in a 4–1 vote, the Colorado Senate Committee on Ethics found that Winter did not uphold the Senate's ethics standards when she appeared to be drunk at a community meeting in Northglenn earlier in 2024. The committee, with three Democratic and two Republican members, had the option to recommend censure or expulsion but instead forwarded a report to the Senate President, James Coleman -D, leaving the decision on how to proceed to him. Also, the committee warned Winter that any new allegations of ethics violations may bring sanctions and gave her the option to address the full Senate regarding her behavior.

=== 2016 legislative session ===
Winter served on the Appropriations Committee, the Business, Labor, Economic, and Workforce Development Committee, and the Transportation and Energy Committee. She sponsored bipartisan bill HB16-1438, which makes it an unfair employment practice if an employer fails to provide reasonable accommodations for an applicant for employment or an employee for conditions related to pregnancy or childbirth.

=== 2015 legislative session ===
In 2015, Winter sponsored multiple bipartisan bills, including HB15-1275 which builds programs in high schools that allow students to get real-world experience in apprenticeships, and HB15-1323, which works to reduce testing burden on students and teachers by nearly 40 hours.

== Personal life and death ==
Winter was born on May 7, 1980, in Littleton, Colorado. She was the mother of two children from an earlier marriage, a daughter and a son, and was engaged to Matt Gray at the time of her death. Winter suffered from health problems throughout her political career, including being diagnosed with an autoimmune disease in 2022.

Winter died in a multi-vehicle car crash in Centennial, Colorado, on the evening of November 26, 2025, at the age of 45. Three other people were injured in the accident. The Arapahoe County Sheriff's Office determined that Winter caused the accident when she rear-ended a stopped Ford F-350 flatbed truck in the left traffic lane of Interstate 25. The Arapahoe County Coroner's Office found that her blood alcohol level was 0.185% at the time of the accident, a level well above the amount needed to cite a driver in Colorado with driving under the influence. Governor Jared Polis ordered the state's flags to fly at half-staff until her funeral.
