= Colorado's 11th Senate district =

American legislative district

Colorado's 11th State Senate district
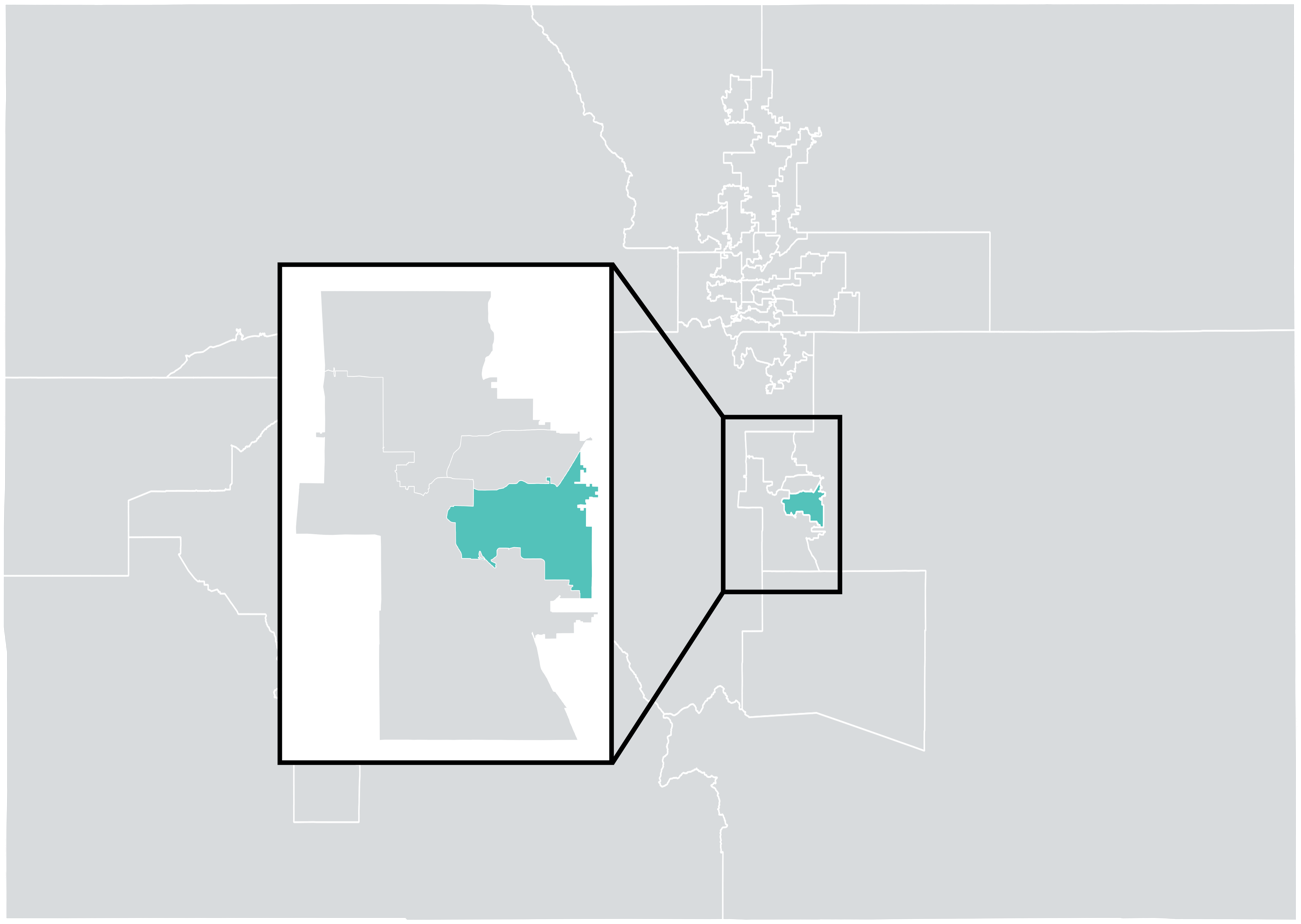
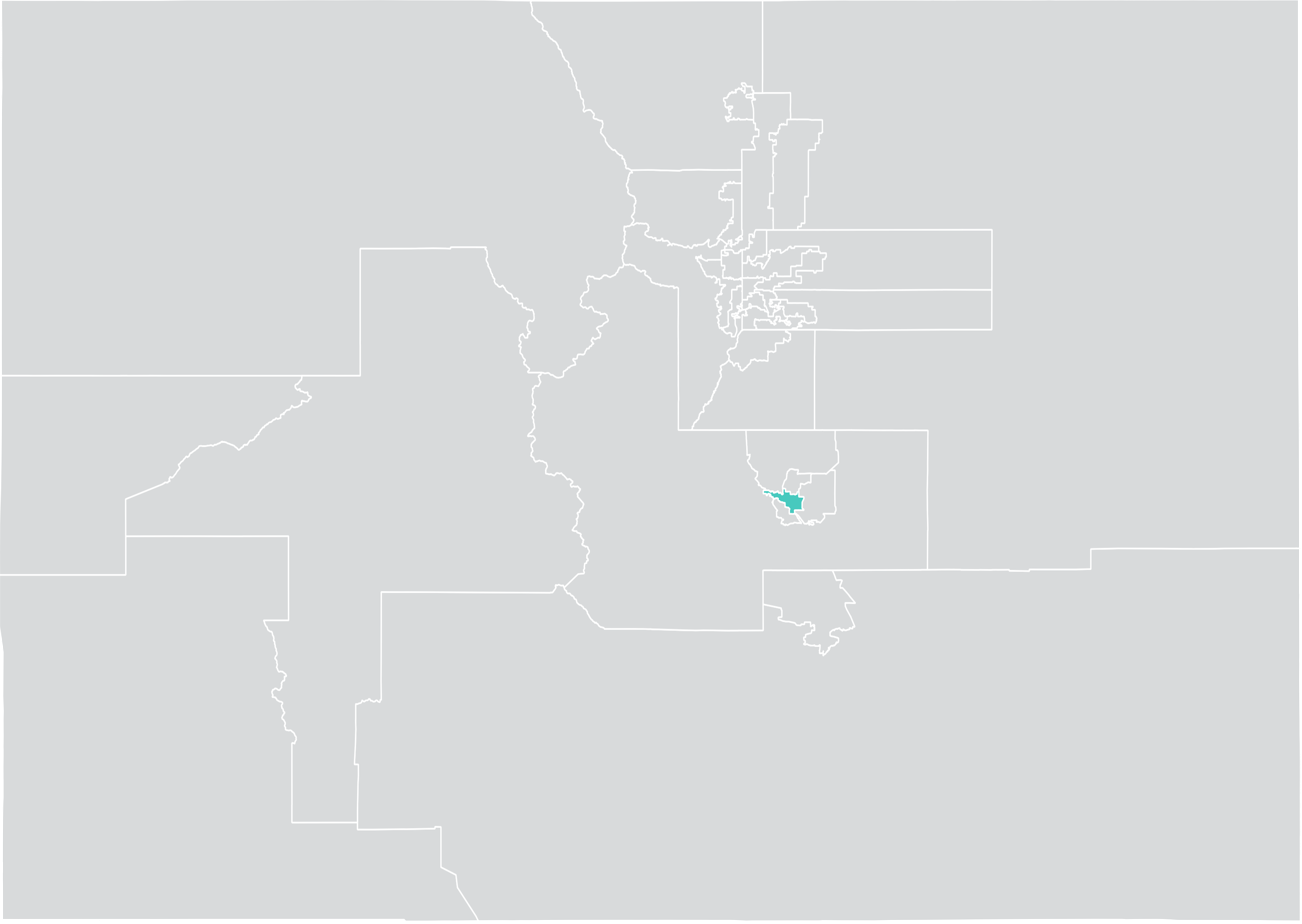
Senator
Tony Exum; D–Colorado Springs
- Registration: 21.2% Democratic; 20.6% Republican; 54.7% No party preference
- Demographics: 56% White; 9% Black; 27% Hispanic; 3% Asian; 5% Other
- Population (2018): 147,383
- Registered voters: 92,005

Colorado's 11th Senate district is one of 35 districts in the Colorado Senate. It has been represented by Democrat Tony Exum since 2023. Prior to redistricting the district was represented by Democrats Pete Lee and Michael Merrifield.

== Geography ==
District 11 is based in central Colorado Springs in El Paso County, also stretching to cover the nearby communities of Manitou Springs and Stratmoor.

The district is located entirely within Colorado's 5th congressional district, and overlaps with the 17th, 18th, and 20th districts of the Colorado House of Representatives.

== Recent election results ==
Colorado state senators are elected to staggered four-year terms; under normal circumstances, the 11th district holds elections in midterm years.

=== 2022 ===
The 2022 election will be the first one held under the state's new district lines. Democratic incumbent Pete Lee now lives in the 12th district, meaning he won't be able to run for the Senate at all in 2022, and 2nd district Republican senator Dennis Hisey is running in the 11th district instead.

2022 Colorado Senate election, District 11
Primary election
Party	Candidate	Votes	%
Democratic	Tony Exum	4,887	54.1
Democratic	Yolanda Avila	4,147	45.9
Total votes		9,034	100
General election
Democratic	Tony Exum	20,258	49.9
Republican	Dennis Hisey	18,042	44.5
Libertarian	Daryl Kuiper	2,264	5.6
Total votes		40,564	100

== Historical election results ==
=== 2018 ===
2018 Colorado Senate election, District 11
Party	Candidate	Votes	%
Democratic	Pete Lee	28,015	62.0
Republican	Pat McIntire	17,200	38.0
Total votes		45,215	100
Democratic hold			

=== 2014 ===
2014 Colorado Senate election, District 11
Party	Candidate	Votes	%
Democratic	Michael Merrifield	18,815	52.2
Republican	Bernie Herpin (incumbent)	14,978	41.5
Libertarian	Norman Dawson	2,282	6.3
Total votes		36,075	100
Democratic gain from Republican			

=== 2013 recall ===
In 2013, an attempt to recall incumbent Democrat John Morse over his support for gun control legislation was successful, resulting in the election of Republican Bernie Herpin.

Shall John Morse be recalled from the office of State Senate, District 11?
Choice	Votes	%
For	9,131	50.89
Against	8,812	49.11
Total	17,943	100.00

2013 Colorado Senate recall election, District 11
Party	Candidate	Votes	%
Republican	Bernie Herpin	8,895	83.2
Write-in		1,796	16.8
Total votes		10,691	100
Republican gain from Democratic			

=== Federal and statewide results ===
Year	Office	Results
2020	President	Biden 58.6 – 36.9%
2018	Governor	Polis 58.2 – 36.4%
2016	President	Clinton 50.2 – 39.3%
2014	Senate	Udall 50.6 – 41.7%
2014	Governor	Hickenlooper 51.1 – 41.3%
2012	President	Obama 59.2 – 37.6%
