= 2013 Colorado recall election =

2013 Colorado Senate recall election
- September 10, 2013

2 of the 35 seats in the Colorado Senate 18 seats needed for a majority
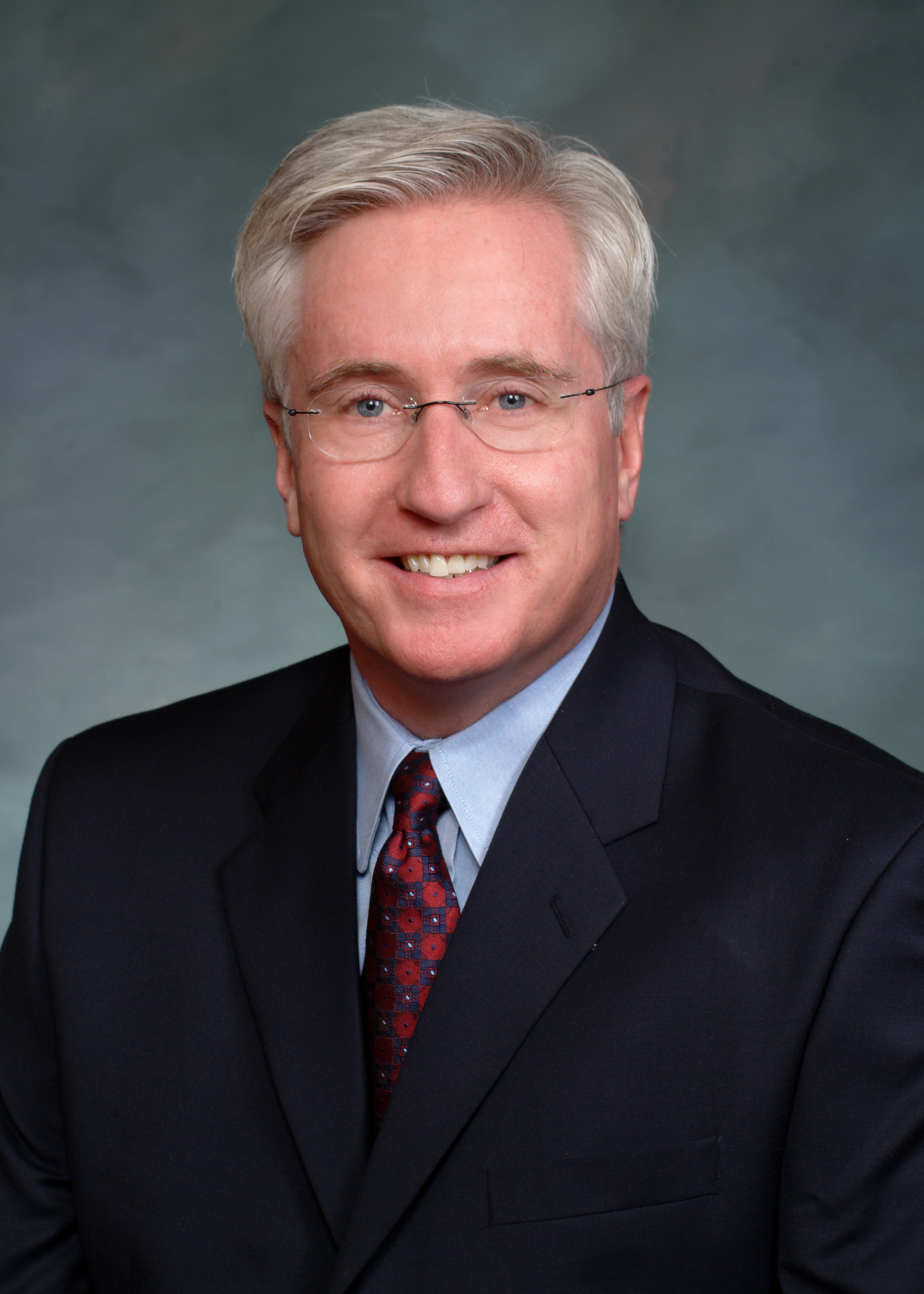

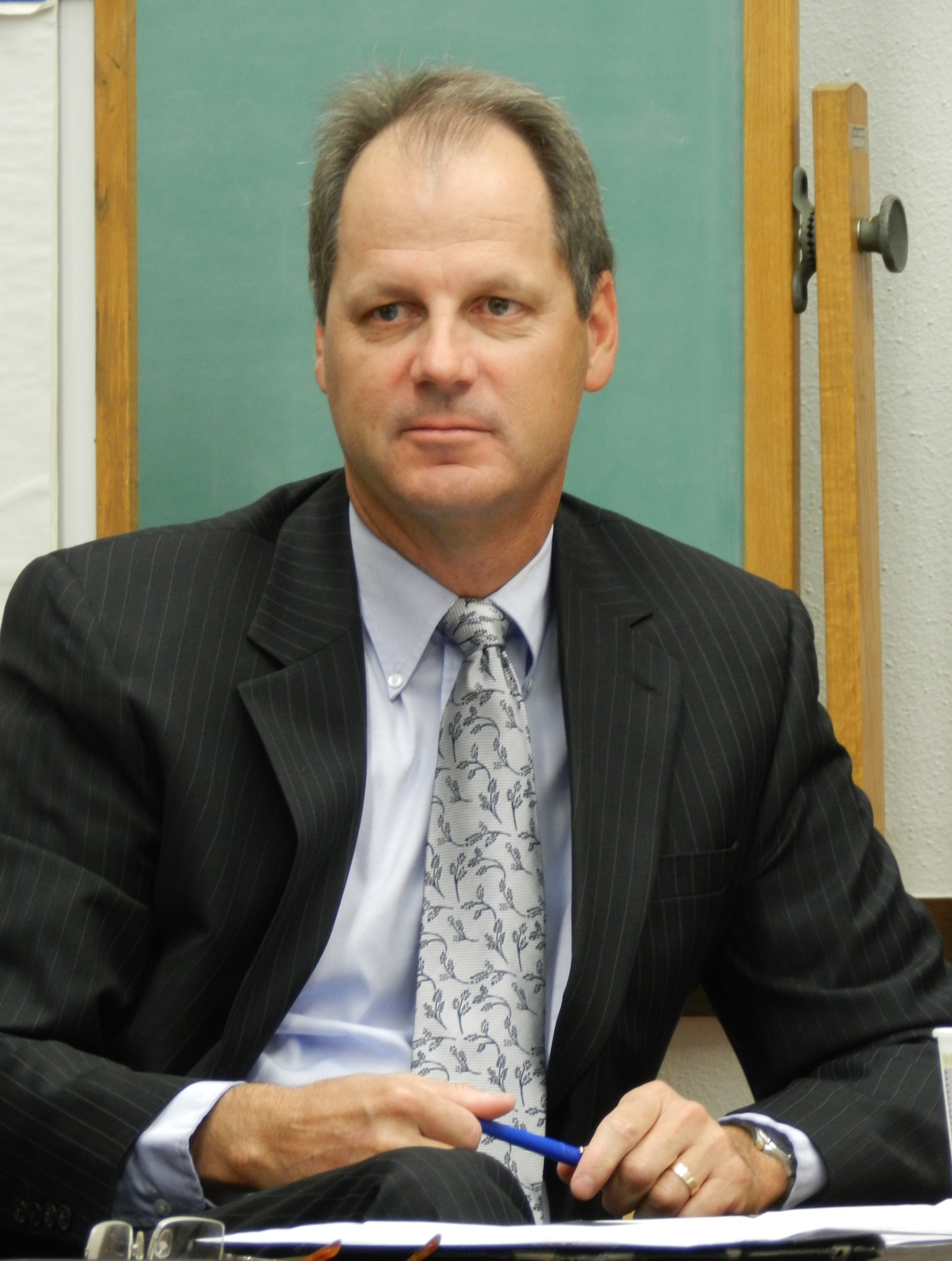
	Majority party	Minority party
Leader	John Morse (defeated)	Bill Cadman
Party	Democratic	Republican
Leader's seat	District 29	District 12
Last election	20	15
Seats before	20	15
Seats won	0	2
Seats after	18	17
Seat change	▼2	▲2
Popular vote	24,188 (Note: Votes against recalling Democratic incumbent)	28,582 (Note: Votes for recalling Democratic incumbent)
Percentage	45.84%	54.16%
- Results: Republican gain No election
President before election
John Morse
Democratic
Elected President
Morgan Carroll
Democratic

The Colorado recall election of 2013 was a successful effort to recall two Democratic members of the Colorado Senate following their support for new gun control legislation. Initially four politicians were targeted, but sufficient signatures could only be obtained for State Senate President John Morse and State Senator Angela Giron.

During the petition drive, national organizations on both the gun rights and gun control sides became involved by providing mailings and donations. Once the petitions were submitted, Morse and Giron challenged the effort in court, but were denied the injunction that they had requested from the court. A further court hearing resulted in the election being conducted in-person rather than by mail, which also led to Giron complaining of voter suppression.

In the election, held on September 10, 2013, both Morse and Giron were recalled by the voters of their districts and replaced with Republicans George Rivera and Bernie Herpin, respectively. It was the first time a state legislator in Colorado had been recalled. In the 2014 Senate elections 13 months later, both Rivera and Herpin were defeated by their Democratic opponents.

== Background ==
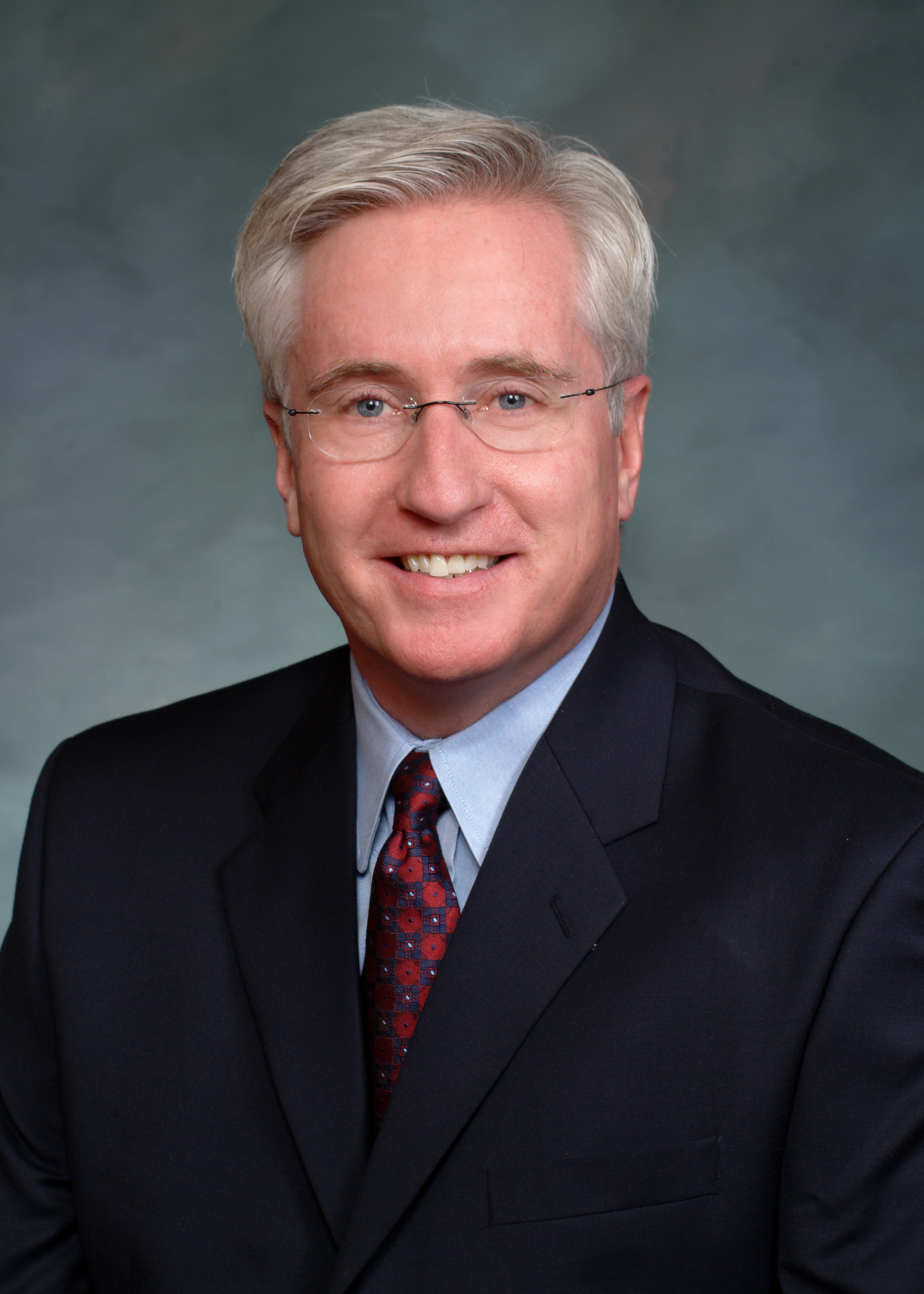
Former Colorado Senate President John Morse

In early 2013, the Colorado legislature passed a series of gun control bills following the theater shooting in Aurora, Colorado and the Sandy Hook school shooting in Newtown, Connecticut. The new laws provided for a ban on magazines holding more than fifteen rounds of ammunition, a universal background check, and a requirement that buyers pay a fee for the background check.

The initial recall petitions targeted Senate President John Morse and State Representative Mike McLachlan. Two additional petitions were also filed against Senators Evie Hudak and Angela Giron. All four are members of the Colorado Democratic Party.

The recall drive against Morse was spearheaded by the Basic Freedom Defense Fund (BFDF) and the El Paso County Freedom Defense Committee. The recall drive against Giron was led by Pueblo Freedom and Rights.

During the petition drive, groups supporting Morse accused the firm collecting the signatures of hiring convicted felons and gathering personal information. Recall backers said that Morse's group was misleading the public. In addition, the recall drives brought in support from national groups on both sides of the issue. The National Rifle Association (NRA) supported the recall effort with mailers and donations. National groups opposing the recall included America Votes, believed to be financially supported by New York City Mayor Michael Bloomberg, as well as California billionaire Eli Broad.

== Submission and certification of petitions ==
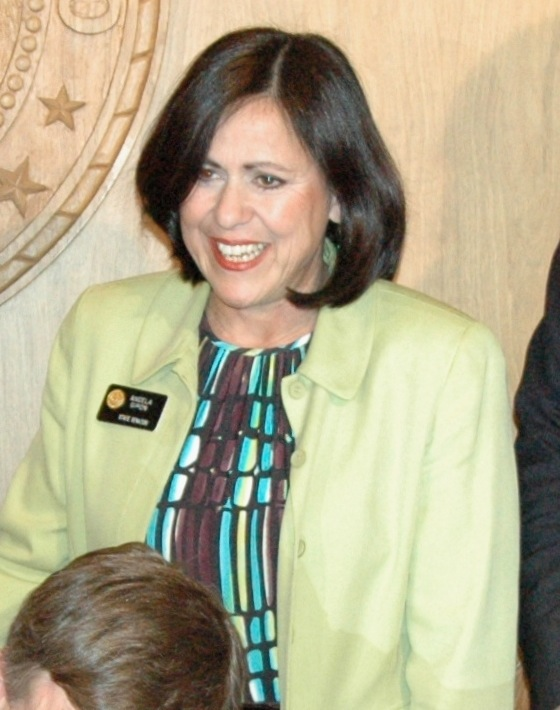
Former Colorado Senator Angela Giron

On June 3, 2013, BFDF turned in over 16,000 signatures petitioning to recall Morse to the Colorado Secretary of State, Republican Scott Gessler, of which only 7,178 needed to be certified in order to force a recall election. In addition, over 13,000 signatures were turned in to recall Giron, of which 11,285 needed to be certified. Efforts to recall McLachlan failed, collecting only about 8,500 signatures of the 10,587 needed. Likewise, the efforts to recall Hudak also failed, falling short of the 18,962 signatures needed.

A group backing Morse alleged that fifty of the signatures on the petitions were forged, including one individual who had been dead for two years. A spokesman for BFDF immediately issued a statement calling for an investigation and stating that if anyone committed fraud the guilty party should be prosecuted "to the fullest extent of the law." The group calling for the recall also alleged that Morse's volunteers were harassing those that signed the petition, requesting that they remove their name from the petition.

=== Challenges ===
Immediately after the signatures for recalling Morse were certified, he filed a challenge to the petitions. Mark Grueskin, Morse's attorney, said: "The petitions circulated are as valid as the back of a matchbook. All of the signatures are invalid." The recall petition was also certified for the effort against Giron. Both Senators claimed the petitions were invalid because they did not use the explicit language that Morse and Giron claim was required under the state constitution. The initial hearings were before the Secretary of State's Office, which denied the challenges.

On July 9, 2013, Morse filed suit in the Denver District Court seeking an injunction to block the recall election. At the same time Secretary of State Gessler filed suit to force Democratic Governor John Hickenlooper to set a date for the recall election. On July 18, 2013, Denver District Court Judge Robert Hyatt issued a preliminary ruling that the recall process must proceed even while Morse and Giron challenged the process in court. Hickenlooper then set the recall election for September 10.

== Election ==
=== Campaign ===
Once the election date was set as September 10, national organizations on both sides of the gun-control debate started to weigh in. On the recall, pro-gun rights side was the National Rifle Association and Americans for Prosperity, while on the gun control side was the Mayors Against Illegal Guns and Mayor Bloomberg. Morse went door-to-door in an effort to gain voter support and both sides of the campaigns accused the other side of mud-slinging. Morse supporters were upset about an ad alleging ethical misconduct by Morse, noting that he had been cleared of those allegations. Giron supporters were accused of misrepresenting the issue as a choice on women's rights and abortion.

Financial donations were also an issue. Bloomberg and Broad donated $350,000 and $250,000, respectively, to support the Senators. The Democratic Legislative Campaign Committee also spent $250,000 to oppose recall. The NRA spent over $108,000 to support the recall efforts. In total, the Morse and Giron side spent approximately $3,000,000 opposing the recall, while the recall supporters spent about $500,000.

=== Replacement candidates ===
Early in the recall process, Republican George Rivera announced his candidacy for Giron's senate seat. Rivera was planning to run against Giron in the 2014 elections but stated he would put his name on the ballot during the recall process. Rivera had to turn in a petition with 1,000 signatures in order to qualify to be on the ballot and turned in 1,500 signatures on July 26. Sonia Negrete Winn, a Democrat, also sought to be on the ballot to replace Giron, but failed to obtain the required signatures to be a candidate. In Morse's district, Republican Bernie Herpin announced his interest in replacing Morse and submitted sufficient signatures to qualify for the ballot.

=== Ballot challenge ===
On August 7, 2013, the Libertarian Party filed a lawsuit stating that they were denied access to have their candidate on the ballot due to a conflict between state law and the state constitution. State law provided for ten days to obtain ballot petition signatures, while the state constitution provided for fifteen days. On August 12, Colorado District Court Judge Robert McGahey ruled that the state constitution's provisions had to be followed, and that prospective candidates had until August 26 to turn in their petitions. The Colorado Supreme Court declined to hear an appeal. The ruling meant that election officials would be unable to conduct the election by mail, as is usual for Colorado, and would have to open up polls for in-person voting. Morse stated that not voting by mail was "bad for everybody."

On August 27, 2013, Hickenlooper asked the Colorado Supreme Court to clarify if a voter had to vote for recall in order to vote for a replacement candidate. At the same time, Libertarian Jan Brooks turned in petitions to be on the ballot against Morse while Democrat Richard Anglund announced his write-in candidacy against Giron. On August 28, the Supreme Court ruled that a voter did not have to vote to recall in order to vote for a replacement, but that the Senators could only be recalled by a majority vote. Secretary of State Gessler announced that Brooks did not have sufficient signatures to qualify for the ballot, leaving only Republican opponents on the ballot.

== Detailed results ==
=== District 3 ===
==== Polling ====
When asked "Will you vote 'yes' or 'no' on the question of whether Angela Giron should be recalled from the office of State Senator?"

Poll source	Date(s) administered	Sample size	Margin of error	Yes	No	Undecided
Public Policy Polling	September 7–9, 2013	579	± ?	54%	42%	4%

==== Results ====
Morse conceded on the evening of September 10. Initial poll returns seemed to indicate that Giron would win her recall election. The final votes were 9,131 to recall Morse and 8,812 to keep him, a 1.78% difference. The final results also ousted Giron, 19,451 to 15,376, an 11.7% difference. Giron's recall was more surprising, as the district is 47% Democratic to 23% Republican, and news reports stated that Giron was stunned at the results. Other sources stated that Giron remained defiant. Giron has claimed that the recall was due to voter suppression. Giron noted that "We were less than two weeks out and we didn't know what the rules were," referring to the change from mail-in ballots to in-person voting.

With the recall of Morse and Giron, Herpin and Rivera were elected to the State Senate to replace them, defeating their respective write-in opponents.

Colorado State Senate District 3, 2013 Recall Question: "Shall Angela Giron Be Recalled?"
Choice	Votes	%
For	19,451	55.85
Against	15,376	44.15
Total	34,827	100.00

Colorado State Senate District 3 successor election, 2013
Party	Candidate	Votes	%
Republican	George Rivera	19,301	88.16
Democratic	Richard Anglund (write-in)	2,592	11.84
Total votes		21,893	100
Republican gain from Democratic			

=== District 11 ===
Colorado State Senate District 11, 2013 Recall Question: "Shall John Morse Be Recalled?"
Choice	Votes	%
For	9,131	50.89
Against	8,812	49.11
Total	17,943	100.00

Colorado State Senate District 11 successor election, 2013
Party	Candidate	Votes	%
Republican	Bernie Herpin	8,895	83.2
Libertarian	Jan Brooks (write-in)	1,796	16.8
Total votes		10,691	100
Republican gain from Democratic			

== Aftermath ==
=== Reactions ===
Giron and Democratic National Committee Chair Debbie Wasserman Schultz claimed that the recall defeat was due to voter suppression. The Denver Post disputed this, saying that the result wasn't caused by voter suppression but the fact that more people showed up to vote against Giron than to vote for her. Gessler said that the Democrats fared worse where more people turned out. Wasserman Schultz also stated that the money spent by the NRA and the Koch brothers made it impossible for Democrats to win.

Charles C. W. Cooke, writing in the National Review Online, stated that it was a grassroots effort, triggered by the perception that the two senators were not listening to the concerns of the public. Ashby Jones of The Wall Street Journal viewed it as a major win for the NRA and a "stinging defeat" for Mayor Bloomberg.

Reuters journalist Keith Coffman stated that the defeat was a sign that Democrats who control Colorado government had reached too far, not just on gun-control, but in other areas also, such as not considering religious exemptions for same sex adoptions, or same-day voter registration.

=== Polling ===
Polling firm Public Policy Polling conducted a poll of Giron's district between September 7 and 9, asking likely voters if they supported the recall of Giron, whether they supported various components of the gun control bill, whether they approved of the NRA and Governor Hickenlooper, and who they would vote for in a hypothetical 2014 gubernatorial election between Hickenlooper and Republican Tom Tancredo, as well as various methodological questions. The results found voters supported recalling Giron by 54% to 42%, with 4% undecided.

However, the firm did not release the poll results before the election. The day after the election, when Giron had been recalled by 12 points, they released the poll and company director Tom Jensen explained why they had not initially done so, citing numerous unusual results. These included the district supporting her recall by such a wide margin, despite having been carried by 20 points by Democratic President Barack Obama in the 2012 election; and voters saying they supported universal background checks by 68% to 27% and being split 47% to 47% on limiting high-capacity ammunition magazines to 15 bullets. Jensen opined that "if voters were really making their recall votes based on those two laws, that doesn't point to recalling Giron by a 12 point margin" and that the NRA had done a "good job of turning the election more broadly into 'do you support gun rights or are you opposed to them.'" Their decision not to release the poll before the election caused significant controversy, with some statisticians and journalists criticising them and others supporting them.

=== 2014 elections ===
In the November 2014 Senate elections 13 months later, both Rivera and Herpin were defeated by large margins by their Democratic opponents. Rivera lost to State Representative Leroy Garcia and Herpin lost to State Representative Michael Merrifield, a noted gun control advocate. Rivera lost by 22,814 votes (45.06%) to 27,813 (54.94%) and Herpin lost by 14,978 votes (41.52%) to 18,815 (52.16%). Despite reclaiming the two seats, the Democrats lost their overall majority in the Colorado Senate.

== Campaign to recall Evie Hudak; her resignation ==
On October 4, 2013, Colorado Secretary of State Scott Gessler approved a second petition to recall Colorado State Senator Evie Hudak, also an advocate of gun control; the signature gatherers had 60 days to collect 18,300 or more signatures to force a recall election in Colorado Senate District 19 which encompasses Arvada, Colorado and Westminster, Colorado. Hudak later resigned rather than face recall. Because she resigned, the Democrats were able to appoint a replacement; if she had been recalled, the Republicans could have gained a majority in the state senate.
