= Regina English =

American politician

Member of the Colorado House of Representatives from the 17th district
- Incumbent
- Assumed office January 9, 2023
- Preceded by: Tony Exum

Member of the Harrison School District 2 School Board
- In office 2019–2023

Personal details
- Born: Battle Creek, Michigan
- Party: Democratic
- Children: 5

Regina English is an American Democratic politician serving Colorado's 17th house district, which includes the county of El Paso, in the Colorado House of Representatives. She won the seat on November 8, 2022, facing off against Republican candidate Rachel Stovall. English also served as the Treasurer of the Harrison School District 2 School Board, a position she has held from 2021-2023. Before serving as Treasurer, English served as the Vice President of the Board from 2019 to 2021. English also sat as the vice-president of the Colorado Black Caucus of School Board Directors until 2023.

== Biography ==
English has an associate degree in chemical dependency/drug and alcohol counseling, a bachelor's degree in management, and a master's degree in public administration. She obtained a Doctorate degree in organizational leadership in January 2023. She has also founded three companies. Yes M.A.A.M. founded in 2014, is a pageant program for African-American women. Be U, founded in 2016 is a Nonprofit organization that mentors young people in leadership skills. She also founded an organization called Be U Life Coaching in 2021.

== Committees ==
English is a member of two committees, the committee on Public & Behavioral Health & Human Services, and the committee on Business Affairs and Labor.

== Controversy ==
A bill that would require each pet - even goldfish - in the state to be registered for a fee was introduced as HB24-1163 by English and was featured on the YouTube channel "Lehto's Law". According to Professor Lehto, the bill was not expected to clear committee.

== Same-sex marriage vote ==
During 2024, Regina English was the only Democratic member to have voted no and against same-sex marriage within the chamber - on a resolution (SCR3) to repeal and remove the “defunct and unconstitutional” 2006 ban on same-sex marriage, effecting the Constitution of Colorado. SCR3 eventually passed both houses of the Colorado Legislature by a 2/3rds super-majority and will be on the ballot for voters to decide in November.

== Elections Results ==
2019 General election for Colorado Springs City Council At-large (3 seats)
Party	Candidate	Votes	%
Independent	Wayne W. Williams	47,622	18.6
Independent	Bill Murray	31,610	12.4
Independent	Tom Strand	31,107	12.2
Independent	Gordon Klingenschmitt	28,383	11.1
Independent	Terry Martinez	27,440	10.7
Independent	Tony Gioia	20,609	8.1
Independent	Regina English	19,840	7.8
Independent	Athena Roe	17,746	6.9
Independent	Val Snider	14,787	5.8
Independent	Dennis Spiker	9,880	3.9

2021 General election for Colorado Springs City Council District 4
Party	Candidate	Votes	%
Independent	Yolanda Avila	3,503	61.5
Independent	Regina English	2,191	38.5

2022 Democratic Primary for Colorado House of Representatives District 17
Party	Candidate	Votes	%
Democratic	Regina English	2,387	54.0
Democratic	Mischa Smith	2,035	46.0

2022 General election for Colorado House of Representatives District 17
Party	Candidate	Votes	%
Democratic	Regina English	10,313	57.3
Republican	Rachel Stovall	7,693	42.7

2024 Democratic Primary for Colorado House of Representatives District 17
Party	Candidate	Votes	%
Democratic	Regina English	3,147	100.0

2024 General election for Colorado House of Representatives District 17
Party	Candidate	Votes	%
Democratic	Regina English	14,461	55.9
Republican	Elizabeth Riggs	11,423	44.1

2026 Democratic Primary for Colorado House of Representatives District 17
Party	Candidate	Votes	%
Democratic	Regina English	3,701	62.4
Democratic	Chauncy Johnson	2,232	37.6

2026 General election for Colorado House of Representatives District 17
Party	Candidate	Votes	%
Democratic	Regina English		
Republican	Laura Martin		
Libertarian	John Angle		
Republican	Sherrea Elliott-Sterling (Write In)		
