= Pete Lee =

American politician

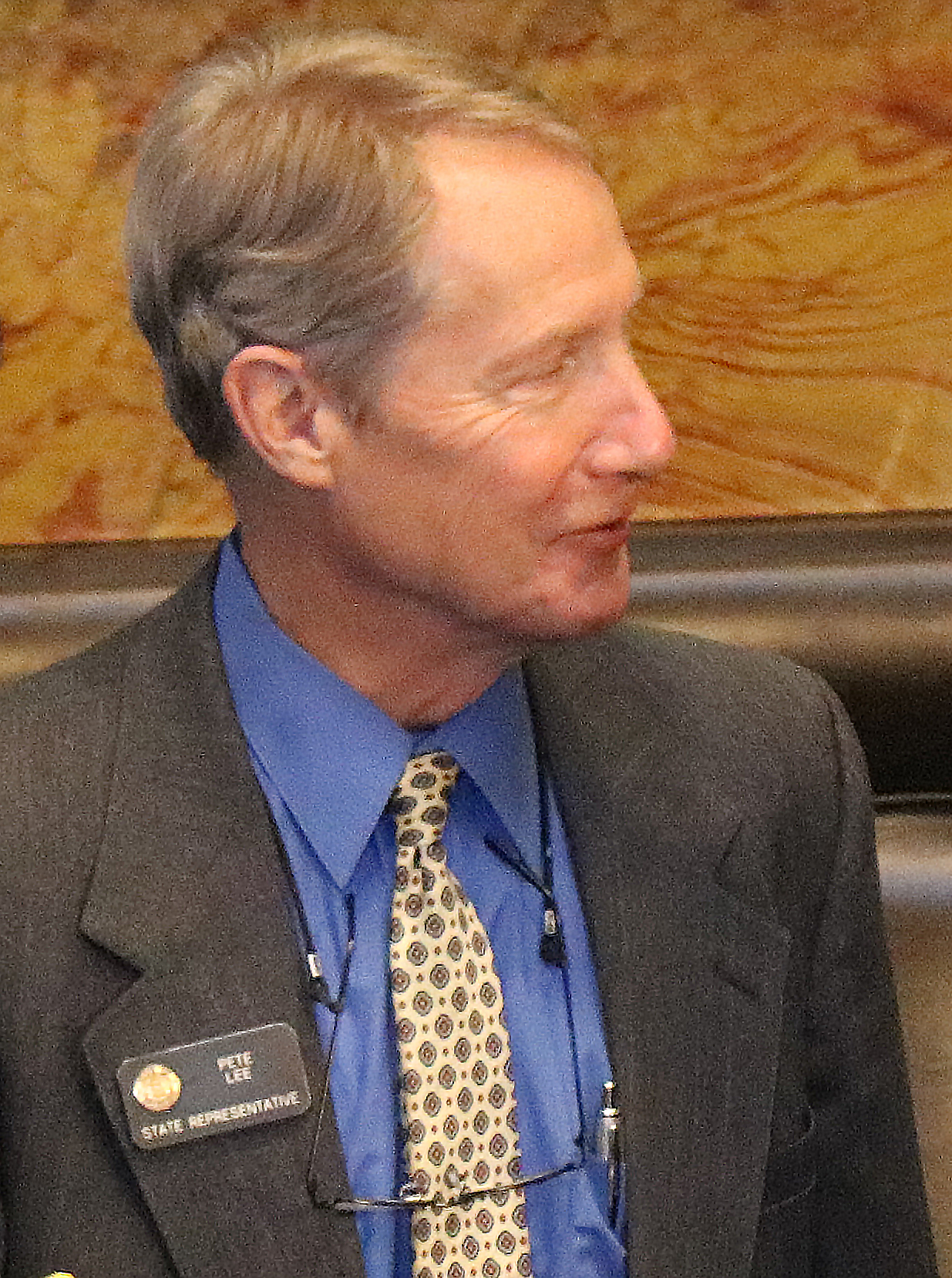

Member of the Colorado Senate from the 11th district
- In office January 4, 2019 – January 9, 2023
- Preceded by: Michael Merrifield
- Succeeded by: Tony Exum

Member of the Colorado House of Representatives for District 18
- In office January 11, 2011 – January 4, 2019
- Preceded by: Michael Merrifield
- Succeeded by: Marc Snyder

Personal details
- Born: Sanford Edmund Lee; October 11, 1947 (age 79)
- Party: Democratic
- Spouse: Lynn
- Children: 3
- Education: University of Akron School of Law; Ohio Wesleyan University
- Website: peteleecolorado.com

Sanford Edmund Lee (born October 11, 1947) is an American politician. He served in the Colorado Senate from the 11th district as a member of the Democratic Party. Prior to his tenure in the state senate he served in the Colorado House of Representatives from the 18th district.

== Early life ==
Sanford Edmund Lee was born on October 11, 1947. He graduated from Ohio Wesleyan University with a bachelor of Arts degree in 1970, attended Wharton School of Finance from 1970 to 1971, and graduated from the University of Akron School of Law with a Juris Doctor in 1975. He married Lynn, with whom he had three children.

== State legislature ==
=== Elections ===
Lee ran for a seat in the Colorado House of Representatives from the 18th district and defeated Republican nominee Karen Cullen in the 2010 election. He defeated Republican nominee Jennifer George, Libertarian nominee Robert Melamede, and Constitution nominee Amy Fedde in the 2012 election. He defeated Republican nominee Michael Schlierf in the 2014 election. He defeated Republican nominee Cameron Forth and Libertarian nominee Norman Dawson in the 2016 election.

Michael Merrifield, a member of the Colorado Senate from the 11th district, did not seek reelection in the 2018 election. Lee announced his campaign on September 2, 2017, and defeated Republican nominee Pat McIntire. A petition was issued in 2019 to recall Lee, but it was unsuccessful. He did not run for reelection in 2022.

=== Tenure ===
During Lee's tenure in the state house he served on the Education committee and chaired Judiciary committee. During his tenure in the state senate he chaired the Judiciary committee and served as vice-chair of the Finance committee. Lee supported Amy Klobuchar during the 2020 Democratic presidential primaries.

In 2022, Lee was indicted by a grand jury for registering to vote at an address where he did not live, but Judge Eric Bentley dismissed the case due to incorrect residency information being provided to the prosecution.

== Political positions ==
Lee voted against legislation that required Colorado's public employee pension fund to oppose Boycott, Divestment and Sanctions. Lee was among thirty-seven legislators who endorsed a letter in 2018, calling for Planned Parenthood to allow for their workers to form a union. He supported legislation to prohibit the death penalty.

Lee received an A rating from NARAL Pro-Choice America. His scores from the American Civil Liberties Union ranged from 88% in 2013, 100% in 2014, 40% in 2015, 100% in 2016, 100% in 2017, 100% in 2018, and 80% in 2019.

== Electoral history ==
2010 Colorado House of Representatives 18th district Democratic primary
Party	Candidate	Votes	%	±%
Democratic	Pete Lee	2,860	100.00%	
Total votes		2,860	100.00%	

2010 Colorado House of Representatives 18th district election
Party	Candidate	Votes	%	±%
Democratic	Pete Lee	10,808	54.68%	
Republican	Karen Cullen	8,959	45.32%	
Total votes		19,767	100.00%	

2012 Colorado House of Representatives 18th district Democratic primary
Party	Candidate	Votes	%	±%
Democratic	Pete Lee (incumbent)	2,929	100.00%	
Total votes		2,929	100.00%	

2012 Colorado House of Representatives 18th district election
Party	Candidate	Votes	%	±%
Democratic	Pete Lee (incumbent)	19,588	53.07%	
Republican	Jennifer George	15,021	40.70%	
Libertarian	Robert Melamede	1,465	3.97%	
Constitution	Amy Fedde	836	2.26%	
Total votes		36,910	100.00%	

2014 Colorado House of Representatives 18th district Democratic primary
Party	Candidate	Votes	%	±%
Democratic	Pete Lee (incumbent)	3,141	100.00%	
Total votes		3,141	100.00%	

2014 Colorado House of Representatives 18th district election
Party	Candidate	Votes	%	±%
Democratic	Pete Lee (incumbent)	15,998	55.54%	
Republican	Michael Schlierf	12,807	44.46%	
Total votes		28,805	100.00%	

2016 Colorado House of Representatives 18th district Democratic primary
Party	Candidate	Votes	%	±%
Democratic	Pete Lee (incumbent)	3,940	100.00%	
Total votes		3,940	100.00%	

2016 Colorado House of Representatives 18th district election
Party	Candidate	Votes	%	±%
Democratic	Pete Lee (incumbent)	21,145	53.30%	
Republican	Jennifer George	15,556	39.21%	
Libertarian	Norman Dawson	2,972	7.49%	
Total votes		39,673	100.00%	

2016 Colorado Senate 11th district Democratic primary
Party	Candidate	Votes	%	±%
Democratic	Pete Lee	10,499	100.00%	
Total votes		10,499	100.00%	

2018 Colorado Senate 11th district election
Party	Candidate	Votes	%	±%
Democratic	Pete Lee	28,015	61.96%	
Republican	Pat McIntire	17,200	38.04%	
Total votes		45,215	100.00%	
