= Colorado's 18th House of Representatives district =

American legislative district

Colorado's 18th State House of Representatives district
Representative
Amy Paschal; D–Colorado Springs
- Demographics: 75% White; 3% Black; 13% Hispanic; 2% Asian; 0% Native American; 5% Multiracial
- Population (2021): 86,755

Colorado's 18th House of Representatives district is one of 65 districts in the Colorado House of Representatives. It has been represented by Amy Paschal since 2025.

== Geography ==
District 18 is based in El Paso County and covers western Colorado Springs, and includes the neighborhoods of Downtown, Old Colorado City and Colorado College as well as rural towns along U.S. Route 24 such as Cascade, Green Mountain Falls and Manitou Springs.

== Members ==
- Michael Merrifield (2002–2010)
- Pete Lee (2011–2019)
- Marc Snyder (2019–2025)
- Amy Paschal (since 2025)
