= Bernie Herpin =

American politician

William B. "Bernie" Herpin, Jr.

Member of the Colorado Senate from the 11th district
- In office September 11, 2013 – January 7, 2015
- Preceded by: John Morse
- Succeeded by: Michael Merrifield

Personal details
- Born: August 1943 (age 82) St. Petersburg, Florida, U.S.
- Party: Republican
- Spouse: Linda Elaine (Bjornerud) Herpin
- Education: University of Kansas (BS); Webster University (MA)
- Profession: Colorado State Senator

William B. "Bernie" Herpin, Jr. is a former member of the Colorado Senate, serving from 2013 to 2015. A Republican, Herpin is a former member of the Colorado Springs, Colorado city council and a United States Navy veteran.

Herpin represented Senate District 11, which encompasses Manitou Springs, Colorado and eastern Colorado Springs. On September 10, 2013, he defeated recalled Senator John Morse in a historic recall election—the first such election in Colorado history.

== Early life and career ==
Herpin was born in St. Petersburg, Florida in August 1943. He earned a Bachelor of Science degree in Aerospace Engineering from the University of Kansas and a Master of Arts degree in Computer Resource Management from Webster University. Herpin and his wife, Linda have three daughters and seven grandchildren. They have resided in Colorado Springs, Colorado, since 1962.

== Military service ==
In August 1965, Herpin enlisted in the United States Navy. After completing his schooling and serving on the USS Simon Bolivar (SSBN-641), he was selected for the Navy Enlisted Scientific and Education Program and attended the University of Kansas. He graduated with a Bachelor of Science degree in Aerospace Engineering and was commissioned as an Ensign in the U.S. Navy.

Herpin served on board the USS John Marshall (SSBN-611), the USS Robert E. Lee (SSBN-601). He also served at the Naval Submarine Training Facility (Pacific) with duty stations in New London, CT; Charleston, SC; Vallejo, CA; and Pearl Harbor, HI. In 1980, he transferred to the US Air Force and was assigned to Headquarters, North American Aerospace Defense Command, in Colorado Springs, Colorado. He retired from military service as a Captain in 1985 and, in the same year, graduated from Webster University with a Master of Arts degree in Computer Resource Management.

Since 1985, Herpin has worked in the private sector as a defense contractor supporting the Air Force. He left Lockheed Martin in December 2013 to serve as a Colorado State Senator.

== Colorado Springs City Council ==
Herpin was originally appointed to an at-large council seat in March 2006 to complete the term of a member who had resigned. He was elected to a full term in April 2009 as the representative of District 4, which covers the southeast quadrant of the city.

== Police volunteer ==
Herpin has served as a volunteer with the Colorado Springs Police Department for more than 30 years. He is currently the Team Leader of the Colorado Springs Police Department Disabled Parking Enforcement Unit and a member of the CSPD Stetson Hills Division's Speed Monitoring Team.

== Colorado Senate ==
Per the wording of the recall ballot, Herpin replaced Senator John Morse on September 10, 2013, when Morse was recalled in the first legislative recall election in Colorado history; Morse was recalled by a margin of 51% to 49%.
