= Colorado's 17th House of Representatives district =

American legislative district

Colorado's 17th State House of Representatives district
Representative
Regina English; D–Colorado Springs
- Demographics: 41% White; 12% Black; 36% Hispanic; 2% Asian; 0% Native American; 7% Multiracial
- Population (2021): 85,960

Colorado's 17th House of Representatives district is one of 65 districts in the Colorado House of Representatives. It has been represented by Regina English since 2023.

== Geography ==
District 17 is based in southern Colorado Springs, and includes the neighborhood of Stratmoor as well as Colorado Springs Airport.

== Members ==
- Mark Barker (until 2013)
- Tony Exum (2013–2015)
- Catherine Roupe (2015–2017)
- Tony Exum (2017–2023)
- Regina English (since 2023)
