= Tony Exum =

American politician (born 1952)

Tony Exum Sr
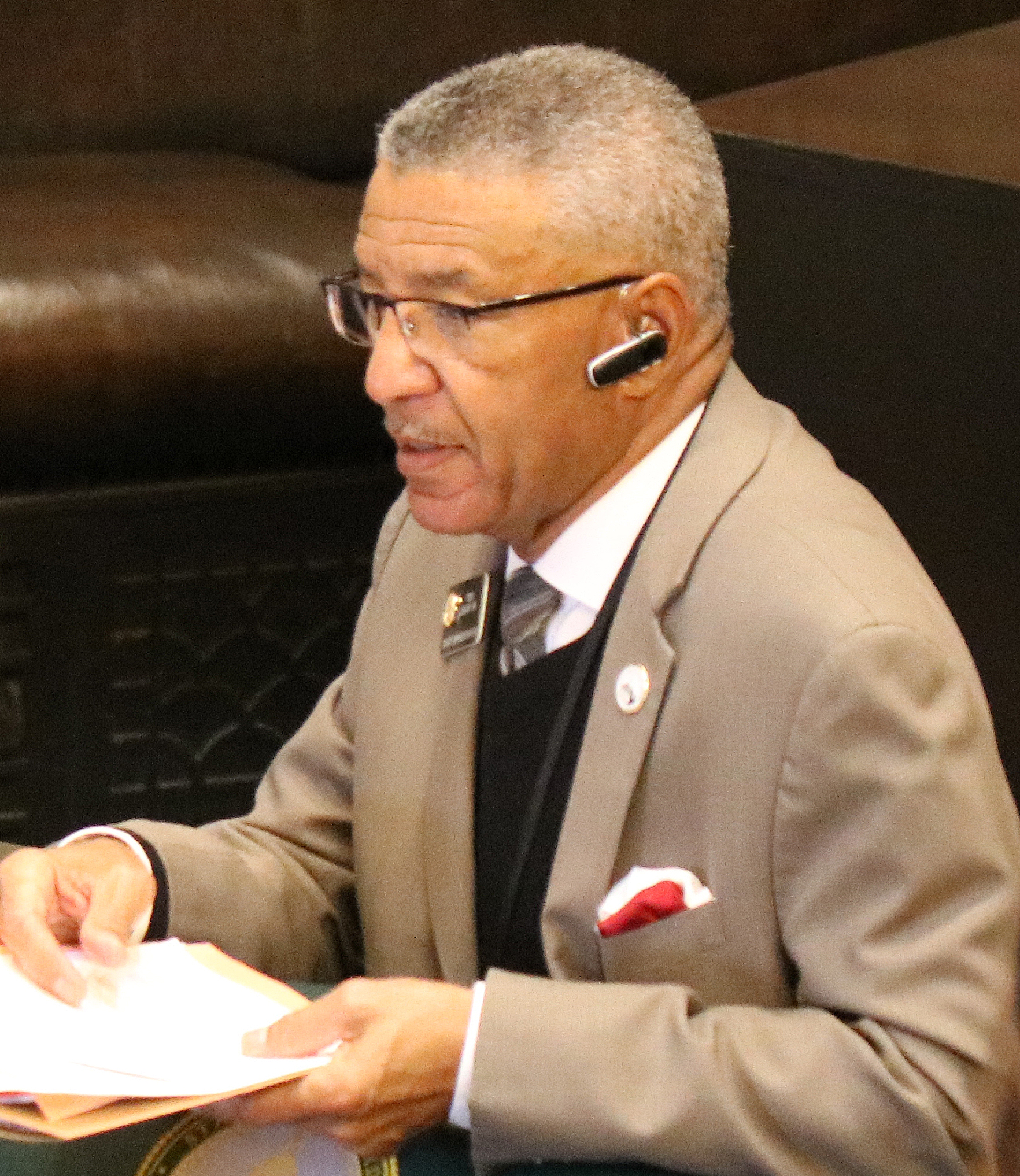

Member of the Colorado Senate from the 11th district
- Incumbent
- Assumed office January 9, 2023
- Preceded by: Pete Lee

Member of the Colorado House of Representatives from the 17th district
- In office 2017 – January 9, 2023
- Preceded by: Catherine Roupe
- Succeeded by: Regina English
- In office 2013–2015
- Preceded by: Mark Barker
- Succeeded by: Catherine Roupe

Personal details
- Born: June 16, 1952 (age 74) Raleigh, North Carolina, U.S.
- Party: Democratic
- Education: University of Southern Colorado (BS)
- Website: Website

Thomas Exum Sr. (born June 16, 1952) is an American politician who is a Democratic member of the Colorado Senate. He represents District 11, which includes all or parts of Colorado Springs, Cimarron Hills and Stratmoor in El Paso County. Previously, Exum served in the Colorado House of Representatives, representing the 17th district from 2013 to 2015 and again from 2017 to 2023.

== Early life and education ==
Thomas Exum Sr. was born in Raleigh, North Carolina, on June 16, 1952. He graduated from the University of Southern Colorado with a Bachelor of Science degree in 1994. He worked as a firefighter for thirty-five years and served as a battalion chief.

== Colorado House of Representatives ==
=== Elections ===
Exum received the Democratic nomination to run for a seat in the Colorado House of Representatives from the 17th district in the 2012 election. He defeated Republican nominee Mark H. Barker, Libertarian nominee Susan Quilleash, and American Constitution nominee Barry Forest Pace in the election.

Republican nominee Catherine Roupe defeated Exum in the 2014 election. During the 2016 election he was endorsed by President Barack Obama and defeated Roupe and Quilleash in the general election. He won reelection in the 2018 election against Roupe. He defeated Republican nominee Rob Blancken and Libertarian nominee Quilleash in the 2020 election.

During the 2022 election Exum won the Democratic nomination for a seat in the Colorado Senate against Yolanda Avila. In the general election, Exum defeated Republican Sen. Dennis Hisey.

=== Tenure ===
During Exum's tenure in the state house he served as chair of the Government committee and served on the Education, and Transportation and Local committees.

== Electoral history ==
2012 Colorado House of Representatives 17th district Democratic primary
Party	Candidate	Votes	%
Democratic	Tony Exum	1,567	100.00%
Total votes		1,567	100.00%

2012 Colorado House of Representatives 17th district election
Party	Candidate	Votes	%
Democratic	Tony Exum	11,212	54.57%
Republican	Mark H. Barker	7,757	37.76%
Libertarian	Susan Quilleash	1,006	4.90%
American Constitution	Barry Forest Pace	570	2.77%
Total votes		20,545	100.00%

2014 Colorado House of Representatives 17th district Democratic primary
Party	Candidate	Votes	%
Democratic	Tony Exum (incumbent)	1,548	100.00%
Total votes		1,548	100.00%

2014 Colorado House of Representatives 17th district election
Party	Candidate	Votes	%	±%
Republican	Catherine Roupe	6,766	47.27%	+9.51%
Democratic	Tony Exum (incumbent)	6,477	45.25%	−9.32%
Libertarian	Susan Quilleash	1,071	7.48%	+2.58%
Total votes		14,314	100.00%	

2016 Colorado House of Representatives 17th district Democratic primary
Party	Candidate	Votes	%
Democratic	Tony Exum	2,034	100.00%
Total votes		2,034	100.00%

2016 Colorado House of Representatives 17th district election
Party	Candidate	Votes	%	±%
Democratic	Tony Exum	11,445	49.39%	+4.14%
Republican	Catherine Roupe (incumbent)	9,613	41.48%	−5.79%
Libertarian	Susan Quilleash	2,116	9.13%	+1.65%
Total votes		23,174	100.00%	

2018 Colorado House of Representatives 17th district Democratic primary
Party	Candidate	Votes	%
Democratic	Tony Exum	3,618	100.00%
Total votes		3,618	100.00%

2018 Colorado House of Representatives 17th district election
Party	Candidate	Votes	%	±%
Democratic	Tony Exum (incumbent)	11,037	58.76%	+9.37%
Republican	Catherine Roupe	7,745	41.24%	−0.24%
Total votes		18,782	100.00%	

2020 Colorado House of Representatives 17th district Democratic primary
Party	Candidate	Votes	%
Democratic	Tony Exum (incumbent)	5,940	100.00%
Total votes		5,940	100.00%

2020 Colorado House of Representatives 17th district election
Party	Candidate	Votes	%	±%
Democratic	Tony Exum (incumbent)	15,780	56.76%	−2.00%
Republican	Rob Blancken	10,398	37.40%	−3.84%
Libertarian	Susan Quilleash	1,621	5.83%	+5.83%
Total votes		27,799	100.00%	

2022 Colorado State Senate 11th district Democratic primary
Party	Candidate	Votes	%
Democratic	Tony Exum	4,912	54.03%
Democratic	Yolanda Avila	4,179	45.97%
Total votes		9,091	100.00%

2022 Colorado State Senate 11th district general election
Party	Candidate	Votes	%
Democratic	Tony Exum	20,258	49.94%
Republican	Dennis Hisey	18,042	44.48%
Libertarian	Daryl Kuiper	2,264	5.58%
Total votes		40,564	100.00%
