= John Morse (Colorado politician) =

American politician (born 1958)

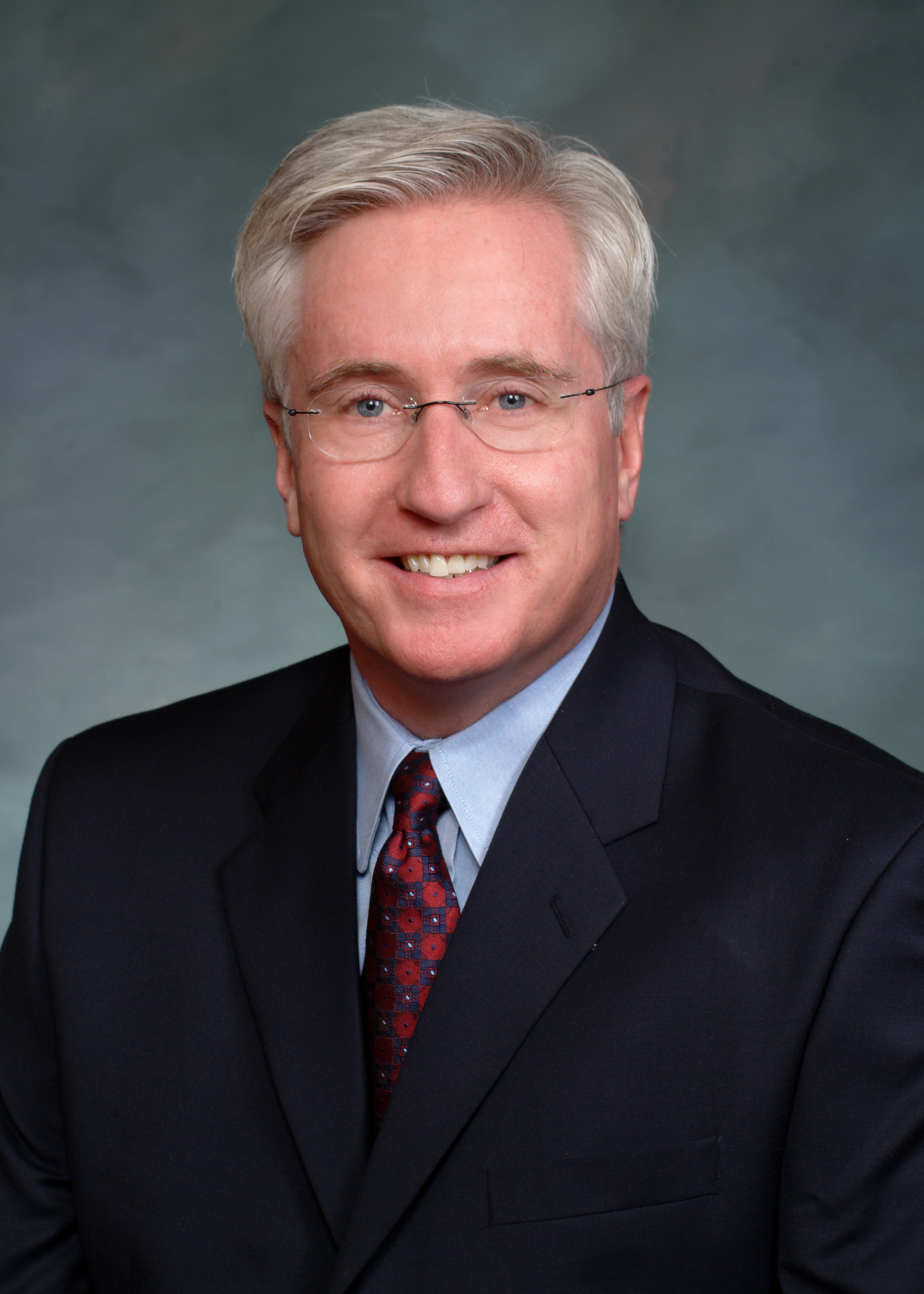
- Official portrait, 2007

President of the Colorado Senate
- In office January 9, 2013 – September 10, 2013
- Preceded by: Brandon Shaffer
- Succeeded by: Morgan Carroll

Member of the Colorado Senate from the 11th district
- In office January 10, 2007 – September 10, 2013
- Preceded by: Ed Jones
- Succeeded by: Bernie Herpin

Personal details
- Born: John P. Morse; November 4, 1958 (age 67) Petersburg, Virginia, U.S.
- Party: Democratic
- Education: University of Colorado Colorado Springs; Regis University (MBA); University of Colorado Denver (PhD)

John P. Morse (born November 4, 1958) is an American former politician who was a state senator in the Colorado Senate from 2007 to 2013, serving as president of the senate in 2013. He is a member of the Democratic Party. Morse represented Senate District 11, which encompassed at the time Manitou Springs, Colorado, and eastern Colorado Springs.

On September 10, 2013, Morse was recalled from office as a reaction to his involvement in passing gun control laws. He was the first legislator to be successfully recalled in the state's history.

== Early life and career ==
Morse was born on November 4, 1958, in Petersburg, Virginia into a military family, the eldest of ten children. He earned the Eagle Scout rank in the Boy Scouts of America as a teenager. He graduated from Mitchell High School in Colorado Springs, Colorado; He attended the University of Colorado at Boulder and then the University of Colorado at Colorado Springs, earning a bachelor's degree in accounting and finance, while working as an emergency medical technician.

After working briefly as a Certified Public Accountant, Morse began to pursue a career in public affairs, earning first an MBA from Regis University in 1984, then a Master of Public Administration degree from the University of Colorado at Colorado Springs in 1996 and a Ph.D. in public affairs from the University of Colorado at Denver in 2001.

== Police officer ==
While pursuing advanced degrees, Morse worked for the Colorado Springs Police Department, advancing to the rank of Sergeant.

After nine years in Colorado Springs, Morse joined the police staff in Fountain, Colorado, just south of Colorado Springs. In October 2002, he became acting police chief and was appointed as the permanent police chief in February 2003. He held the chief of police position until November 2003, just nine months later.

In 2004, Morse became the president and CEO of Silver Key Senior Services, a Colorado Springs-based non-profit.

== Legislative career ==
=== 2006 election ===
Morse ran for the Colorado Senate in 2006, and won a decisive victory in a competitive district, defeating incumbent Republican legislator Ed Jones. Although Morse had lived in Colorado Springs for over three decades, Colorado Republicans accused Morse of "carpetbagging" for moving into the district from his previous residence just outside district boundaries only a year before the 2006 election. Advertisements aired during the campaign accused Morse of incompetence as police chief of Fountain, but were pulled from broadcast because of inaccuracies.

=== 2007 legislative session ===
In the 2007 legislative session, Morse served on the Senate Health and Human Services Committee, the Senate Finance Committee, and was Vice-Chair of the Senate Judiciary Committee. During his first term, Morse sponsored legislation to create a pilot mental health services program for discharged combat veterans in Colorado, and to change Colorado's concealed carry permit system for firearms.

Following the regular legislative session, Morse served on the interim legislative Health Care Task Force and was vice-chair of the Police Officers' and Firefighters' Pension Reform Commission.

In November 2007, Morse was elected by the Democratic caucus to serve on the influential Joint Budget Committee.

=== 2008 legislative session ===
In the 2008 session of the General Assembly, Morse sat on the Joint Budget Committee and chaired the Senate Appropriations Committee. He also sat on a special ethics panel investigating possible conflicts of interest for Colorado State Fair engineering contracts received by Sen. Abel Tapia.

Among the legislation sponsored by Morse during the 2008 legislative session were a bill to increase drivers license fees to fund trauma care and require $5000 of trauma care to be covered in car insurance policies, and a bill to increase marriage license fees to fund Court Appointed Special Advocate programs.

Another of Morse's bills, to establish a database of school security practices for use by Colorado schools and create the Colorado School Safety Resource Center to help school districts with safety plans, was passed by the legislature and signed into law by Gov. Ritter.

Morse was also the Senate sponsor of successful legislation encouraging judges to consider restorative justice as part of juvenile sentencing. He also sponsored legislation to grant public hospitals taxing authority so that they can satisfy the federal definition of a "public hospital" and qualify for federal funding.

During the session, Morse was the lone legislator to vote in committee in favor of a proposal to require the use of paper ballot in all 2008 Colorado elections. As a member of the Joint Budget Committee, Morse was also a prominent voice supporting Democratic Party priorities in the state 2008-09 state budget, arguing in favor of increased spending on education and health care.

In July 2008, Morse publicly called for an investigation of 4th Judicial District DA John Newsome amid reports that Newsome inappropriately used taxpayer money to pay for over $500 in expenses surrounding a trip to a college football game. Newsome, who faced a challenger in the Republican primary for the district attorney's position, denied wrongdoing and alleged that Morse's accusations were "politics of personal destruction." Both the Colorado Bureau of Investigation and the Colorado Attorney General's office launched investigations into Newsome's conduct.

During the 2008 election, Morse was an outspoken critic of El Paso County Clerk and Recorder Bob Balink, whom he accused of implementing a "12-point strategy" to disenfranchise voters including improperly interpreting rules regarding voter registration for students at Colorado College. Balink's office denied any improper conduct.

Following the 2008 general election, Morse was nominated for the posts of Senate President Pro-Tem and Senate Assistant Majority Leader, but lost the caucus' vote for each post to Sen. Betty Boyd and Sen. Lois Tochtrop, respectively.

In December, Morse was named Outstanding Public Official in the Gay & Lesbian Fund for Colorado's 2008 Advancing Equality Awards.

=== 2009 legislative session ===
April 17, 2009, he was selected to become Colorado's next Senate Majority Leader, following the resignation of Senate President Peter Groff and the promotion of previous Majority Leader Brandon Shaffer.

For the 2009 session of the Colorado General Assembly, Morse was named chair of the Senate Judiciary Committee and a member of the Senate Health and Human Services Committee.

Morse introduced legislation to increase vehicle registration fees by $1 to pay for rural ambulance services. and to increase survivor benefits for police and fire fighters.

=== 2013 legislative session ===
In March 2013, the Colorado legislature passed a set of gun control laws, prompted by the movie theater shooting in Aurora, Colorado, in July 2012, as well as the Sandy Hook Elementary School shooting in December 2012. The laws, which became effective July 1, limited ammunition magazines to 15 rounds, required universal background checks on all gun purchases, and required gun buyers, rather than sellers, to pay the $10 fee for a background check.

Morse introduced SB13-196, the Assault Weapon Responsibility Act. "Assault weapon" was defined to exclude only handguns, shotguns and "bolt-action" rifles. All rifles generally considered semi-automatic (e.g., using only recoil to discharge a spent cartridge) were included in Morse's definition. If enacted, SB13-196 would have subjected the owner, seller, distributor and/or manufacturer of an "assault weapon" to strict liability for injury unless able to prove that extensive standards of care had been followed.

=== 2013 recall ===
In response to the new gun control laws, an initiative began almost immediately to recall Morse and three other state legislators, all Democrats who had voted for the laws. The recall effort was organized by the Basic Freedom Defense Fund (BFDF) and the El Paso County Freedom Defense Committee. Opponents of Morse's were further galvanized by an interview Morse gave on The Rachel Maddow Show in which he said that he had advised his Senate colleagues to "stay away from some of this toxicity," by not reading "any more [emails from people who 'think their Second Amendment-rights are being abridged'] than you absolutely have to."

On June 3, 2013, organizers of the recall turned in 16,046 signatures to recall Morse from political office, well over the 7,178 needed to force a recall election. Another state senator, Angela Giron, also received enough signatures to force a recall election, although the two other targeted legislators, Rep. Mike McLachlan of Durango and Sen. Evie Hudak of Westminster, did not. Morse and Giron became the first Colorado legislators ever to be subject to a recall election.

The election attracted national attention and funding, being seen as a referendum of sorts on gun control. Opponents of the recall raised around $3 million, including $350,000 from New York City mayor Michael Bloomberg, while supporters of the recall raised around $540,000, mostly from the National Rifle Association of America.

The Morse recall election took place on September 10, 2013, and passed by 51% to 49%. Giron was recalled in the same election, by the wider margin of 56% to 44%. Per the wording of the recall ballot, Morse was replaced by Republican Bernie Herpin, a former Colorado Springs councilman.

== Electoral history ==
Colorado State Senate District 11, 2013 Recall Question: "Shall John Morse Be Recalled?"
Choice	Votes	%
For	9,131	50.89
Against	8,812	49.11
Total	17,943	100.00

Colorado State Senate Election District 11, 2010
Party	Candidate	Votes	%
Democratic	John Morse (Incumbent)	13,866	48.3
Republican	Owen Hill	13,526	47.1
Libertarian	Douglas W. Randall	1,320	4.6
Total votes		28,712	100.0
Democratic hold			

Colorado State Senate Election District 11, 2006
Party	Candidate	Votes	%
Democratic	John Morse	16,420	60.7
Republican	Ed Jones (Incumbent)	10,648	39.3
Total votes		27,068	100.0
Democratic gain from Republican			
