= Michael Merrifield =

American politician

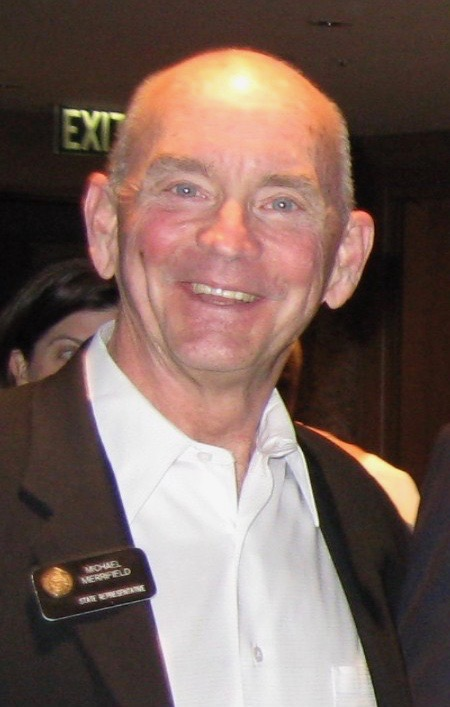

Member of the Colorado Senate from the 11th district
- In office January 7, 2015 – January 4, 2019
- Preceded by: Bernie Herpin
- Succeeded by: Pete Lee

Personal details
- Born: 1946 or 1947 (age 78–79)
- Party: Democratic
- Profession: Retired Educator

Michael Merrifield (born 1946/47) is an American politician from Colorado. He served four terms (2002-2010) as a Representative in House District 18. He was chairman of the House Education Committee and also served on the House Transportation and Energy Committee. After leaving the legislature in 2010 due to term limits, he campaigned to serve as an El Paso County Commissioner in District 5, but lost. In 2011, he campaigned for a seat on the Colorado Springs City Council, but was defeated by Lisa Czelatdko. Following his unsuccessful campaigns, he became Colorado state coordinator for Mayors Against Illegal Guns. In 2014, Merrifield was elected to the Colorado State Senate for District 11. He served until the end of his term in 2019 to which he retired from politics.

Merrifield was mentioned as a possible candidate for the office of the Governor of Colorado in the 2018 election, however, he declined a candidacy and endorsed Cary Kennedy for Governor.

== Biography ==
Michael taught music in Arizona, California, and Colorado for over 30 years and has received numerous awards for his outstanding leadership in the field of education. Prior to serving in the Colorado House, Michael served on the Manitou Springs City Council. He received a MA and a BA in music education from the University of Arizona. Michael is active in the Colorado Music Educators Association (CMEA), American Choral Directors Association, and the Colorado Education Association. He received the Crystal Apple award in 2000 as one of Colorado Springs School District 11's finest educators.

Merrifield is an avid mountain biker and backcountry skier. He wrote Colorado Gonzo Rides, a well-known mountain bike guidebook. He has a son and a daughter. He lives in Colorado Springs.

== Legislative career ==
While serving on the House Transportation and Energy Committee, Merriifield worked to alleviate congestion on Colorado's roadways while also taking steps to combat climate change. His 2008 "Renter's Bill of Rights" legislation granted basic legal rights to Coloradans who live in leased housing to make sure they have safe, habitable living conditions. It also set up tenant responsibilities for care of a residence. He also sponsored the "Rest in Peace" bill, which prohibits protesters from coming within 100 feet (or 150 feet if using a public address system) of mourners.
