= 2022 Colorado elections =

A general election was held in the U.S. state of Colorado on November 8, 2022. All of Colorado's executive officers were up for election, as well as all of Colorado's seats in the United States House of Representatives, and Colorado's U.S. Senate seat currently occupied by Michael Bennet.

The Colorado Democratic Party had a very successful election, sweeping every statewide race by a double-digit margin. The party easily maintained control of the state's Class 3 U.S. Senate seat and all state executive offices, including the governorship. Democrats expanded their majorities in both chambers of the General Assembly and won five of eight U.S. House districts, including winning the newly drawn 8th district in an upset and nearly flipping the Republican-leaning 3rd district in an unexpectedly close result.

The lopsided results were described by many as a "blue wave", with one Republican strategist labeling it an "utter annihilation" in an op-ed with Colorado Politics. After unexpectedly losing his own race, Republican state representative Colin Larson lamented that "Colorado Republicans need to take this and learn the lesson that the party is dead. This was an extinction-level event."

== United States Senate ==
Democratic incumbent Michael Bennet was re-elected to a third term full term against Republican Joe O'Dea. Bennet won with 55.9% of the vote.

== U.S. House of Representatives ==
=== Congressional District 1 ===
Incumbent Democrat Diana DeGette won re-election against Republican Jennifer Qualteri. DeGette was re-elected with 80.3% of the vote.

=== Congressional District 2 ===
Incumbent Democrat Joe Neguse won re-election against Republican Marshall Dawson. Neguse was re-elected with 70.0% of the vote.

=== Congressional District 3 ===
Incumbent Republican Lauren Boebert won re-election against Democrat Adam Frisch. Boebert was re-elected with 50.1% of the vote.

=== Congressional District 4 ===
Incumbent Republican Ken Buck won re-election against Democrat Ike McCorkle. Buck was re-elected with 60.9% of the vote.

=== Congressional District 5 ===
Incumbent Republican Doug Lamborn won re-election against Democrat David Torres. Lamborn was re-elected with 56.0% of the vote.

=== Congressional District 6 ===
Incumbent Democrat Jason Crow won re-election against Republican Steven Monahan. Crow was re-elected with 60.6% of the vote.

=== Congressional District 7 ===
Incumbent Democrat Ed Perlmutter retired. Democrat Brittany Pettersen defeated Republican Erik Aadland. Pettersen was elected with 56.4% of the vote.

=== Congressional District 8 ===
Colorado gained a congressional district after the 2020 Census. Democrat Yadira Caraveo defeated Republican Barbara Kirkmeyer. Caraveo was elected with 48.4% of the vote to Kirkmeyer's 47.7%.

== Governor and lieutenant governor ==
Democratic incumbent Jared Polis was re-elected to a second term against Republican Heidi Ganahl. Polis won with 58.5% of the vote.

== Attorney general ==
Incumbent Democrat Phil Weiser won re-election against Republican John Kellner. Weiser was re-elected with 54.7% of the vote.

== Secretary of state ==
Incumbent Democrat Jena Griswold won re-election against Republican Pam Anderson. Griswold was re-elected with 55.1% of the vote.

== Treasurer ==
Incumbent Democrat Dave Young won re-election against Republican Lang Sias. Young was re-elected with 53.7% of the vote.

== State Board of Education ==
Four seats on the Colorado State Board of Education were up for election.

District	Party	Incumbent	Status	Party	Candidate	Votes	%
5	Republican	Steve Durham	running	Republican	Steve Durham	157,068	58.39%
5	Republican	Steve Durham	running	Democratic	Joseph Shelton	111,914	41.61%
6	Democratic	Rebecca McClellan	running	Democratic	Rebecca McClellan	159,191	58.28%
6	Democratic	Rebecca McClellan	running	Republican	Molly Lamar	113,955	41.72%
8	TBA	open seat	N/A	Democratic	Rhonda Solis	117,434	49.28%
8	TBA	open seat	N/A	Republican	Peggy Propst	115,483	48.46%
8	TBA	open seat	N/A	Constitution	James Treibert	5,367	2.25%

Source: Colorado Secretary of State

=== At-large seat ===
During periods in which there are an even number of congressional distrcts (such as there will be for the 2022 election), the Colorado State Board of Education features an at-large member in order to retain an odd number of members and avoid ties. During the period in which there were six congressional districts, current governor Jared Polis most recently held this position.

==== Candidates ====
- Kathy Plomer (Democratic), former Adams 12 school board president
- Dan Maloit (Republican), U.S. Army veteran and St. Vrain Valley school parent
- Ryan Van Gundy (Libertarian), engineer
- Eric Bodenstab (Unity), engineer

==== General election ====
Results by county Plomer: 40–50%; 50–60%; 60–70%; 70–80%; Maloit: 40–50%; 50–60%; 60–70%; 70–80%; 80–90%

2022 Colorado State Board of Education at-large seat election
Party	Candidate	Votes	%
Democratic	Kathy Plomer	1,296,355	53.43
Republican	Dan Maloit	1,044,303	43.04
Libertarian	Ryan Van Gundy	68,969	2.84
Unity	Eric Bodenstab	16,502	0.68
Total votes		2,426,129	100

== CU Regent ==
Four out of nine seats on the University of Colorado Board of Regents were up for election in 2022.

District	Party	Incumbent	Status	Party	Candidate	Votes	%
1	Democratic	Jack Kroll	not running	Democratic	Wanda James	213,030	78.60%
1	Democratic	Jack Kroll	not running	Republican	Amy Naes	57,953	21.38%
1	Democratic	Jack Kroll	not running	Democratic	Ben Pope (write-in)	51	0.02%
4	Republican	Sue Sharkey	term-limited	Republican	Frank McNulty	217,975	63.96%
4	Republican	Sue Sharkey	term-limited	Democratic	Jack Barrington	122,805	36.04%
5 (special)	Republican	Ken Montera	running (Note: Appointed on December 20, 2021.)	Republican	Ken Montera	160,715	60.39%
5 (special)	Republican	Ken Montera	running	Democratic	Ron Casados	105,404	39.61%
8	TBA	open seat	N/A	Republican	Mark VanDriel	120,151	51.68%
8	TBA	open seat	N/A	Democratic	Yolanda Ortega	112,328	48.32%

Source: Colorado Secretary of State

== General Assembly ==
17 out of 35 seats in the Colorado Senate and all 65 seats in the Colorado House of Representatives were up for election.

== State Judiciary ==
=== Court of Appeals ===
Eight judges on the Colorado Court of Appeals faced retention in 2022.

2022 Colorado Court of Appeals retention elections
Judge Name	Appointer	Term begin	Preceded by	Results			
Judge Name	Appointer	Term begin	Preceded by	For	%	Against	%
Jaclyn Casey Brown	Jared Polis (D)	2019	Karen Ashby	1,344,611	70.07	574,223	29.93
Terry Fox	Bill Ritter (D)	2011	Sean Connelly	1,329,981	69.92	572,292	30.08
Christina Gomez	Jared Polis (D)	2020	Daniel Taubman	1,332,517	70.01	570,844	29.99
Matthew Grove	John Hickenlooper (D)	2019	Alan Loeb	1,324,871	70.07	565,998	29.93
Sueanna Johnson	Jared Polis (D)	2020	Robert Hawthorne	1,332,304	70.37	560,890	29.63
Lino Lipinsky de Orlov	John Hickenlooper (D)	2018	Nancy Lichtenstein	1,308,066	69.24	581,192	30.76
Neeti Pawar	Jared Polis (D)	2019	Laurie Booras	1,281,506	67.92	605,270	32.08
David Yun	Jared Polis (D)	2020	John Webb	1,308,404	69.49	574,369	30.51
Source: Colorado Secretary of State

Results by county

Judge Brown retention results
For:
- 80–90%
- 70–80%
- 60–70%
- 50–60%
Against:
- 50–60%
Tie:
- 50%

Judge Fox retention results
For:
- 80–90%
- 70–80%
- 60–70%
- 50–60%
Against:
- 50–60%

Judge Gomez retention results
For:
- 80–90%
- 70–80%
- 60–70%
- 50–60%
Against:
- 50–60%

Judge Grove retention results
For:
- 80–90%
- 70–80%
- 60–70%
- 50–60%
Against:
- 50–60%

Judge Johnson retention results
For:
- 80–90%
- 70–80%
- 60–70%
- 50–60%
Against:
- 50–60%

Judge Lipinsky de Orlov retention results
For:
- 80–90%
- 70–80%
- 60–70%
- 50–60%
Against:
- 50–60%

Judge Pawar retention results
For:
- 80–90%
- 70–80%
- 60–70%
- 50–60%
Against:
- 50–60%

Judge Yun retention results
For:
- 80–90%
- 70–80%
- 60–70%
- 50–60%
Against:
- 50–60%

== Colorado ballot measures ==
Eleven statewide measures appeared on the ballot in 2022.

2022 Colorado ballot measures
Name	Description	Votes				Type
Name	Description	Yes	%	No	%	Type
Amendment D	Requires the governor to designate judges from the 18th judicial district to serve in the new 23rd judicial district and require designated judges to establish residence.	1,502,866	67.38	727,409	32.62	Legislatively referred constitutional amendment
Amendment E	Extends an existing homestead exemption for disabled veterans to the surviving spouses of military personnel and certain veterans.	2,109,471	87.93	289,514	12.07	Legislatively referred constitutional amendment
Amendment F	Allows charitable gaming operators to be paid and allows the Legislature to determine how long an organization must exist to obtain a charitable gaming license.	930,370	40.64	1,359,027	59.36	Legislatively referred constitutional amendment
Proposition 121	Reduces the state income tax rate from 4.55% to 4.40%.	1,581,163	65.24	842,506	34.76	Citizen-initiated state statute
Proposition 122	Decriminalizes the use of the psychedelic plants and fungi and creates a services program for the administration of such substances.	1,296,992	53.64	1,121,124	46.36	Citizen-initiated state statute
Proposition 123	Dedicates 0.1% of existing income tax revenue to a new State Affordable Housing Fund.	1,269,816	52.61	1,143,974	47.39	Citizen-initiated state statute
Proposition 124	Increases the number of retail liquor store licenses an individual can own or hold a share in.	905,565	37.69	1,497,346	62.31	Citizen-initiated state statute
Proposition 125	Creates a new fermented malt beverage and wine retailer license to allow stores that are licensed to sell beer to also sell wine.	1,228,404	50.58	1,200,219	49.42	Citizen-initiated state statute
Proposition 126	Allows retail establishments licensed to sell alcohol for off-site consumption to offer deliveries.	1,183,059	48.86	1,238,074	51.14	Citizen-initiated state statute
Proposition FF	Reduces income tax deduction caps and allocates increased revenue to a program for free school meals and local school food grants.	1,384,852	56.75	1,055,583	43.25	Legislatively referred state statute
Proposition GG	Require a table showing changes in income tax owed for average taxpayers in certain brackets to be included in the ballot title for initiated measures.	1,704,757	71.92	665,476	28.08	Legislatively referred state statute
Source: Colorado Secretary of State

Results by county

Amendment D results by county
Yes:
- 80–90%
- 70–80%
- 60–70%
- 50–60%
No:
- 50–60%

Amendment E results by county
Yes:
- >90%
- 80–90%
- 70–80%

Amendment F results by county
No:
- 70–80%
- 60–70%
- 50–60%
Yes:
- 50–60%

Proposition 121 results by county
Yes:
- 80–90%
- 70–80%
- 60–70%
- 50–60%
No:
- 50–60%

Proposition 122 results by county
Yes:
- 70–80%
- 60–70%
- 50–60%
No:
- 70–80%
  60–70%
- 50–60%

Proposition 123 results by county
Yes:
- 70–80%
- 60–70%
- 50–60%
No:
- 70–80%
- 60–70%
- 50–60%

Proposition 124 results by county
No:
- 70–80%
- 60–70%
- 50–60%

Proposition 125 results by county
Yes:
- 50–60%
No:
- 60–70%
- 50–60%

Proposition 126 results by county
No:
- 60–70%
- 50–60%
Yes:
- 50–60%

Proposition FF results by county
Yes:
- 70–80%
- 60–70%
- 50–60%
No:
- 70–80%
- 60–70%
- 50–60%

Proposition GG results by county
Yes:
- 80–90%
- 70–80%
- 60–70%
- 50–60%
No:
- 50–60%
