= 2016 United States Senate election in Colorado =

- November 8, 2016
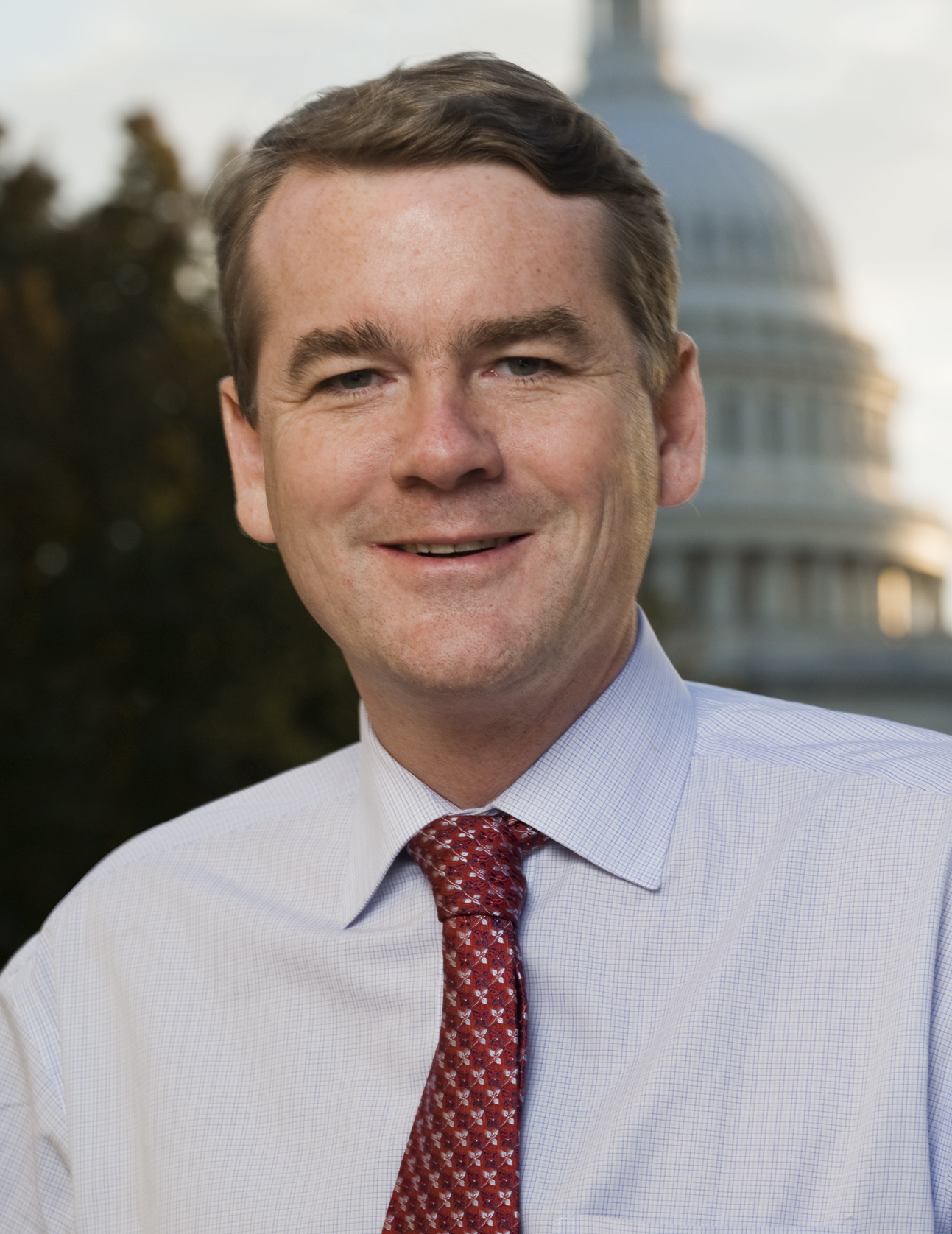

| Nominee | Michael Bennet | Darryl Glenn |
| Party | Democratic | Republican |
| Popular vote | 1,370,710 | 1,215,318 |
| Percentage | 49.97% | 44.31% |
- Bennet: 40–50% 50–60% 60–70% 70–80% 80–90% Glenn: 40–50% 50–60% 60–70% 70–80% 80–90% >90% Tie: 40–50% No votes
U.S. senator before election
Michael Bennet
Democratic
Elected U.S. Senator
Michael Bennet
Democratic

The 2016 United States Senate election in Colorado was held on November 8, 2016, to elect a member of the United States Senate to represent the state of Colorado, concurrently with the 2016 U.S. presidential election, as well as other elections to the United States Senate in other states, elections to the United States House of Representatives, and various state and local elections.

Major party candidates can qualify for the ballot through party assemblies or by petition. To qualify by assembly, a candidate must receive at least 30 percent of the vote from the party's state assembly. To qualify by petition, the candidate must have filed at least 1,500 signatures from each congressional district by April 4, 2016.

Incumbent Democratic Senator Michael Bennet won re-election to a second full term in office. Bennet's main challenger was Republican nominee Darryl Glenn, an El Paso County commissioner. Glenn won a crowded, five-way Republican primary in June. Three other candidates were on the ballot: former Eagle County Commissioner Arn Menconi was the Green Party nominee; Lily Tang Williams was the Libertarian Party nominee; and Unity Party of America chairman Bill Hammons was the Unity Party nominee.

== Background ==
Democratic U.S. Senator Ken Salazar resigned in January 2009 to become United States Secretary of the Interior, and Governor Bill Ritter appointed Bennet, the Superintendent of Denver Public Schools, to replace him. Bennet was elected to a full term in 2010, defeating Republican Ken Buck by 48.1% to 46.4%.

== Democratic primary ==
Incumbent senator Michael Bennet was unopposed for renomination.

=== Candidates ===
==== Nominee ====
- Michael Bennet, incumbent U.S. senator

=== Results ===
Democratic primary results
| Party | Candidate | Votes | % |
|---|---|---|---|
| Democratic | Michael Bennet (incumbent) | 262,344 | 100.0% |
| Total votes | | 262,344 | 100.0% |

== Republican primary ==
The Colorado Republican Party State Assembly was held on April 9, 2016. Darryl Glenn won the convention with 70% of the vote. Robert Blaha, Jack Graham, Jon Keyser, and Ryan Frazier sought to qualify for the ballot by petition instead of through the State Assembly.

Glenn won the June primary with about 37.5% of the vote in the crowded, five-candidate Republican primary field.

=== Candidate controversies ===
In early May, the Denver ABC affiliate uncovered over 10 forged voter signatures on the petition which placed Republican candidate Jon Keyser on the June Republican primary ballot. The circulator who forged the signatures was arrested for 34 felonies. A late May lawsuit claiming at least 60 forged signatures based on the analysis of a handwriting expert and challenging Keyser's placement on the primary ballot was dismissed because it did not fall within the five-day window to challenge a ballot placement.

When asked on-camera about the forgeries, Keyser did not address the issue, and proceeded to inform the interviewer that Keyser's dog was larger than the interviewer.

In early June, when asked by a fellow Republican candidate and a retired Air Force lieutenant colonel whether Keyser received his Bronze Star for work on a software program or for "kicking in doors" in combat as "represented to the community", Keyser refused to answer the question, and claimed he had "no idea" what software program his rival was talking about. Yet, according to the article announcing Keyser's citation, Keyser "developed and implemented a unique and effective technique to provide critical force protection and situational-awareness data to ground counter-terrorism operations."

In August 2014, Republican candidate Jack Graham was fired as Colorado State University athletic director for unspecified reasons, though he would continue to be paid through the November 2016 election.

=== Candidates ===
==== Nominee ====
- Darryl Glenn, El Paso County commissioner

==== Eliminated in primary ====
- Robert Blaha, businessman and candidate for Colorado's 5th congressional district in 2012
- Ryan Frazier, former Aurora city councilman, nominee for Colorado's 7th congressional district in 2010, and candidate for mayor of Aurora in 2011 (withdrew)
- Jack Graham, businessman and former Colorado State University athletic director
- Jon Keyser, former state representative

==== Withdrew ====
- Greg Lopez, former director of the Small Business Administration Colorado District, former mayor of Parker and candidate for Colorado Senate in 2000

==== Rejected at convention ====
- Charlie Ehler, retired air force computer programmer and Tea Party activist
- Jerry Eller, former insurance and real estate agent
- Tom Janich, former Brighton School board member and perennial candidate
- Michael Kinlaw, mortgage broker
- Peggy Littleton, El Paso County commissioner and former Colorado State Board of Education member
- Jerry Natividad, businessman
- Tim Neville, state senator
- Donald Rosier, Jefferson County commissioner
- Erik Underwood, former congressional staffer

==== Declined ====
- Christian Anschutz, real estate developer
- Wil Armstrong, businessman, candidate for Colorado's 6th congressional district in 2008 and son of former U.S. Senator William L. Armstrong
- George Brauchler, Arapahoe County district attorney
- Ken Buck, U.S. representative and nominee for the U.S. Senate in 2010 (running for re-election)
- Bill Cadman, president of the Colorado Senate
- Dan Caplis, radio host
- Cynthia Coffman, Colorado attorney general
- Mike Coffman, U.S. representative, former secretary of state of Colorado and former Colorado state treasurer (running for reelection)
- Dan Domenico, former solicitor general of Colorado
- Owen Hill, state senator and candidate for the U.S. Senate in 2014
- Mike Kopp, former state senator and candidate for governor in 2014
- Steve Laffey, former mayor of Cranston, Rhode Island, candidate for U.S. Senate from Rhode Island in 2006, and candidate for Colorado's 4th congressional district in 2014
- Gale Norton, former United States Secretary of the Interior, former attorney general of Colorado, and candidate for the U.S. Senate in 1996
- Josh Penry, former state senator
- Ellen Roberts, state senator
- Doug Robinson, businessman
- Mark Scheffel, majority leader of the Colorado Senate
- Ray Scott, state senator
- Justin Smith, Larimer County sheriff
- Jerry Sonnenberg, state senator
- Walker Stapleton, Colorado state treasurer
- Amy Stephens, former state representative and candidate for the U.S. Senate in 2014
- Scott Tipton, U.S. representative (running for re-election)
- Brian Watson, real estate developer
- Rob Witwer, former state representative

==== Endorsements ====
Robert Blaha

Organizations

- Family Research Council

Newspapers

- The Gazette
Darryl Glenn

Governors

- Sarah Palin, Alaska (former); 2008 vice presidential nominee

U.S. senators

- Ted Cruz, Texas and 2016 Republican presidential candidate
- Cory Gardner, Colorado
- Mike Lee, Utah
- Rand Paul, Kentucky and 2016 presidential candidate

Statewide officials

- Catherine Bullock, Academy School District 20 Board of Education member
- Steven J. Durham, chairman of the Colorado State Board of Education and former state senator
- Bill Elder, El Paso County sheriff
- Todd Evans, Fountain police chief
- Rick McMorran, Black Forest Fire District Board chairman
- Steve Schleiker, El Paso County assessor
- Jake Shirk, Monument police chief

Mayors

- Rafael Dominguez, mayor of Monument
- Jeff Kaiser, mayor pro tem of Monument
- Neil Levy, mayor of Woodland Park

Individuals

- Carly Fiorina, former CEO of Hewlett-Packard, 2010 nominee for Senate in California and 2016 presidential candidate
- Mark Levin, conservative talk radio host

Organizations

- Senate Conservatives Fund
Jon Keyser

Individuals

- Hank Brown, former U.S. senator
- Bill Owens, former governor
- Tom Tancredo, former U.S. representative
Tim Neville

Individuals

- Justin Everett, state representative
- Ray Garcia, 2014 and 2016 state house candidate
- Kevin Grantham, state senator
- Jennifer Green, Castle Rock councilwoman
- Ted Harvey, former state senator
- Chris Holbert, state senator
- Stephen Humphrey, state representative
- Janak Joshi, state representative
- Kent Lambert, state senator
- Tim Leonard, state representative
- Vicki Marble, state senator
- Thomas Massie, U.S. representative (KY-04)
- Patrick Neville, state representative
- Kim Ransom, state representative
- Lori Saine, state representative
- David Schultheis, former state senator
- Renee Valentine, Castle Rock councilwoman
- Kevin Van Winkle, state representative
- Dave Williams, former vice chair of the El Paso County Republican Party and 2014 and 2016 state house candidate

Organizations

- Eagle Forum

=== Results ===
Results by county: Glenn: 20–30%; 30–40%; 40–50%; 50–60%; Graham: 20–30%; 30–40%

Republican primary results
| Party | Candidate | Votes | % |
|---|---|---|---|
| Republican | Darryl Glenn | 131,125 | 37.74% |
| Republican | Jack Graham | 85,400 | 24.58% |
| Republican | Robert Blaha | 57,196 | 16.46% |
| Republican | Jon Keyser | 43,509 | 12.52% |
| Republican | Ryan Frazier | 30,241 | 8.70% |
| Total votes | | 347,471 | 100.0% |

Darryl Glenn won the general primary on June 28 and went on to face the other candidates in the November election.

== Third party and independent candidates ==
=== Declared ===
- Bill Hammons (Unity Party), chairman and founder of the Unity Party of America
- Arn Menconi (Green Party), former Eagle County Commissioner and founder of SOS Outreach
- Gary Swing (Boiling Frog Party), promoter and perennial candidate
- Lily Tang Williams (Libertarian), former chair of the Libertarian Party of Colorado and candidate for the state house in 2014

=== Endorsements ===
Lily Tang Williams
- Austin Petersen, 2016 Libertarian presidential candidate

== General election ==
=== Debates ===
| Dates | Location | Bennet | Glenn | Williams | Link |
|---|---|---|---|---|---|
| September 10, 2016 | Grand Junction, Colorado | Participant | Participant | Participant | |
| October 11, 2016 | Denver, Colorado | Participant | Participant | Not invited | |

=== Predictions ===
| Source | Ranking | As of |
|---|---|---|
| The Cook Political Report | Likely D | November 2, 2016 |
| Sabato's Crystal Ball | Safe D | November 7, 2016 |
| Inside Elections | Safe D | November 3, 2016 |
| Daily Kos | Safe D | November 8, 2016 |
| Real Clear Politics | Lean D | November 7, 2016 |

=== Polling ===
View source data.

| Poll source | Date(s) administered | Sample size | Margin of error | Michael Bennet (D) | Darryl Glenn (R) | Other | Undecided |
|---|---|---|---|---|---|---|---|
| SurveyMonkey | November 1–7, 2016 | 2,777 | ± 4.6% | 52% | 45% | — | 3% |
| SurveyMonkey | October 31–November 6, 2016 | 2,412 | ± 4.6% | 51% | 45% | — | 4% |
| Public Policy Polling | November 3–4, 2016 | 704 | ± 3.7% | 50% | 40% | 5% | 6% |
| Keating Research | November 2–3, 2016 | 605 | ± 4.0% | 49% | 38% | 5% | 5% |
| SurveyMonkey | October 28–November 3, 2016 | 1,927 | ± 4.6% | 51% | 45% | — | 4% |
| Breitbart/Gravis Marketing | November 1–2, 2016 | 1,125 | ± 2.9% | 47% | 44% | — | 9% |
| SurveyMonkey | October 27–November 2, 2016 | 1,631 | ± 4.6% | 50% | 46% | — | 4% |
| The Times-Picayune/Lucid | October 28–November 1, 2016 | 972 | ± 3.0% | 49% | 41% | — | 10% |
| SurveyMonkey | October 26–November 1, 2016 | 1,402 | ± 4.6% | 49% | 47% | — | 4% |
| University of Denver | October 29–31, 2016 | 550 | ± 4.2% | 48% | 40% | 3% | 9% |
| Emerson College | October 28–31, 2016 | 750 | ± 3.5% | 47% | 42% | 6% | 5% |
| SurveyMonkey | October 25–31, 2016 | 1,532 | ± 4.6% | 48% | 46% | — | 6% |
| CBS News/YouGov | October 26–28, 2016 | 997 | ± 4.1% | 46% | 41% | 3% | 10% |
| University of Colorado Boulder | October 17–24, 2016 | 1,037 | ± 3.6% | 54% | 40% | 6% | 0% |
| Quinnipiac University | October 10–16, 2016 | 685 | ± 3.7% | 56% | 38% | — | 6% |
| Magellan Strategies (R) | October 12–13, 2016 | 500 | ± 4.4% | 47% | 32% | 9% | 12% |
| Washington Post/SurveyMonkey | October 8–16, 2016 | 956 | ± 0.5% | 52% | 42% | — | 6% |
| Breitbart/Gravis Marketing | October 12–13, 2016 | 1,226 | ± 2.8% | 48% | 38% | — | 13% |
| Breitbart/Gravis Marketing | October 3–4, 2016 | 1,246 | ± 2.8% | 47% | 39% | — | 15% |
| Monmouth University | September 29–October 2, 2016 | 400 | ± 4.9% | 53% | 35% | 7% | 5% |
| Public Policy Polling | September 27–28, 2016 | 694 | ± 3.7% | 44% | 34% | 7% | 15% |
| Public Policy Polling | September 27–28, 2016 | 694 | ± 3.7% | 50% | 40% | — | 10% |
| CNN/ORC | September 20–25, 2016 | 784 LV | ± 3.5% | 53% | 43% | 1% | 2% |
| CNN/ORC | September 20–25, 2016 | 896 RV | ± 3.5% | 53% | 41% | 1% | 2% |
| Breitbart/Gravis Marketing | September 22–23, 2016 | 799 | ± 3.5% | 43% | 45% | — | 12% |
| Quinnipiac University | September 13–21, 2016 | 644 | ± 3.9% | 52% | 43% | 1% | 4% |
| Colorado Mesa University/Rocky Mountain PBS | September 14–18, 2016 | 350 LV | ± 6.3% | 42% | 31% | 4% | 22% |
| Colorado Mesa University/Rocky Mountain PBS | September 14–18, 2016 | 350 LV | ± 6.3% | 45% | 32% | 2% | 20% |
| Colorado Mesa University/Rocky Mountain PBS | September 14–18, 2016 | 540 RV | ± 5.1% | 38% | 26% | 5% | 31% |
| Colorado Mesa University/Rocky Mountain PBS | September 14–18, 2016 | 540 RV | ± 5.1% | 44% | 28% | 3% | 26% |
| Emerson College | September 9–13, 2016 | 600 | ± 3.6% | 46% | 39% | 7% | 8% |
| Magellan Strategies (R) | August 29–31, 2016 | 500 | ± 4.4% | 48% | 38% | 7% | 7% |
| Quinnipiac University | August 9–16, 2016 | 830 | ± 3.4% | 54% | 38% | — | 8% |
| NBC/WSJ/Marist | August 4–10, 2016 | 899 | ± 3.3% | 53% | 38% | 2% | 7% |
| FOX News | July 9–12, 2016 | 600 | ± 4.0% | 51% | 36% | 1% | 9% |
| Monmouth University | July 9–12, 2016 | 404 | ± 4.9% | 48% | 35% | 5% | 12% |
| Harper Polling | July 7–9, 2016 | 500 | ± 4.4% | 46% | 40% | — | 14% |
| NBC/WSJ/Marist | July 5–11, 2016 | 794 | ± 3.5% | 53% | 38% | 2% | 7% |
| Senate Conservatives Fund | July 1–6, 2016 | 500 | – | 47% | 42% | — | 11% |

Hypothetical polling

with Scott Tipton

| Poll source | Date(s) administered | Sample size | Margin of error | Michael Bennet (D) | Scott Tipton (R) | Other | Undecided |
|---|---|---|---|---|---|---|---|
| Greenberg Quinlan Rosner - Democracy Corps | October 24–28, 2015 | 1,600 | ± 3.2% | 50% | 44% | — | 16% |

with Mike Coffman

| Poll source | Date(s) administered | Sample size | Margin of error | Michael Bennet (D) | Mike Coffman (R) | Other | Undecided |
|---|---|---|---|---|---|---|---|
| Quinnipiac University | March 29–April 7, 2015 | 894 | ± 3.3% | 40% | 43% | 4% | 14% |

with Cynthia Coffman

| Poll source | Date(s) administered | Sample size | Margin of error | Michael Bennet (D) | Cynthia Coffman (R) | Other | Undecided |
|---|---|---|---|---|---|---|---|
| Quinnipiac University | March 29–April 7, 2015 | 894 | ± 3.3% | 44% | 36% | 5% | 15% |

=== Results ===
United States Senate election in Colorado, 2016
| Party | Candidate | Votes | % | ±% |
|---|---|---|---|---|
| Democratic | Michael Bennet (incumbent) | 1,370,710 | 49.97% | +1.89% |
| Republican | Darryl Glenn | 1,215,318 | 44.31% | −2.09% |
| Libertarian | Lily Tang Williams | 99,277 | 3.62% | +2.35% |
| Green | Arn Menconi | 36,805 | 1.34% | −0.85% |
| Unity | Bill Hammons | 9,336 | 0.34% | N/A |
| Independent | Dan Chapin | 8,361 | 0.30% | N/A |
| Independent | Paul Fiorino | 3,216 | 0.12% | N/A |
| Total votes | | 2,743,023 | 100.0% | |
| Democratic hold | | | | |

==== By county ====
| County | Michael Bennet Democratic | | Darryl Glenn Republican | | Various candidates Other parties | | Margin | | Total votes cast |
| County | # | % | # | % | # | % | # | % | Total votes cast |
|---|---|---|---|---|---|---|---|---|---|
| Adams | 97,402 | 52.7% | 76,285 | 41.2% | 11,309 | 6.1% | 21,117 | 11.5% | 184,996 |
| Alamosa | 3,695 | 53.0% | 2,894 | 41.5% | 383 | 5.5% | 801 | 11.5% | 6,972 |
| Arapahoe | 162,747 | 54.0% | 123,509 | 41.0% | 15,105 | 5.0% | 39,238 | 13.0% | 301,361 |
| Archuleta | 2,750 | 37.9% | 4,072 | 56.2% | 430 | 5.9% | -1,322 | -18.3% | 7,252 |
| Baca | 577 | 27.0% | 1,469 | 68.7% | 92 | 4.6% | -892 | -41.7% | 2,138 |
| Bent | 810 | 42.2% | 1,034 | 53.9% | 74 | 3.9% | -224 | -11.7% | 1,918 |
| Boulder | 126,334 | 68.0% | 45,755 | 24.6% | 13,731 | 7.4% | 80,579 | 43.4% | 185,820 |
| Broomfield | 19,431 | 53.1% | 15,077 | 41.2% | 2,109 | 5.8% | 4,354 | 11.9% | 36,617 |
| Chaffee | 5,259 | 46.7% | 5,384 | 47.8% | 618 | 5.5% | -125 | -1.1% | 11,261 |
| Cheyenne | 220 | 20.2% | 828 | 76.0% | 42 | 3.9% | -608 | -55.8% | 1,090 |
| Clear Creek | 2,883 | 49.1% | 2,541 | 43.3% | 451 | 7.7% | 342 | 5.8% | 5,875 |
| Conejos | 2,073 | 51.1% | 1,878 | 46.3% | 105 | 2.5% | 195 | 4.8% | 4,056 |
| Costilla | 1,186 | 65.1% | 547 | 30.0% | 90 | 5.0% | 639 | 35.1% | 1,823 |
| Crowley | 504 | 33.2% | 936 | 61.7% | 78 | 5.1% | -432 | -28.5% | 1,518 |
| Custer | 944 | 30.8% | 1,984 | 64.8% | 132 | 4.4% | -1,040 | -34.0% | 3,060 |
| Delta | 4,916 | 29.3% | 10,970 | 65.4% | 875 | 5.2% | -6,054 | -36.1% | 16,761 |
| Denver | 238,774 | 73.0% | 71,078 | 21.7% | 17,441 | 5.4% | 167,696 | 51.3% | 327,293 |
| Dolores | 338 | 28.0% | 808 | 67.1% | 59 | 4.9% | -470 | -39.1% | 1,205 |
| Douglas | 70,005 | 37.6% | 107,920 | 57.9% | 8,459 | 4.6% | -37,915 | -20.3% | 186,384 |
| Eagle | 13,707 | 55.2% | 8,772 | 35.3% | 2,340 | 9.5% | 4,935 | 19.9% | 24,819 |
| El Paso | 113,726 | 35.9% | 183,709 | 58.0% | 19,284 | 6.1% | -69,983 | -22.1% | 316,719 |
| Elbert | 3,684 | 23.2% | 11,558 | 72.6% | 671 | 4.3% | -7,874 | -49.4% | 15,913 |
| Fremont | 6,671 | 30.4% | 14,154 | 64.5% | 1,129 | 5.2% | -7,483 | -34.1% | 21,954 |
| Garfield | 12,039 | 45.9% | 12,596 | 48.1% | 1,566 | 6.0% | -557 | -2.2% | 26,201 |
| Gilpin | 1,729 | 48.3% | 1,502 | 42.0% | 349 | 9.7% | 226 | 6.3% | 3,581 |
| Grand | 3,623 | 42.3% | 4,402 | 51.4% | 541 | 6.3% | -779 | -9.1% | 8,566 |
| Gunnison | 5,517 | 58.7% | 3,216 | 34.2% | 659 | 6.9% | 2,301 | 24.5% | 9,392 |
| Hinsdale | 246 | 42.0% | 316 | 53.9% | 24 | 4.1% | -70 | -11.9% | 586 |
| Huerfano | 1,942 | 51.3% | 1,694 | 44.7% | 153 | 4.0% | 248 | 6.6% | 3,789 |
| Jackson | 235 | 27.5% | 583 | 68.3% | 36 | 4.2% | -348 | -40.8% | 854 |
| Jefferson | 163,172 | 50.8% | 139,237 | 43.3% | 18,962 | 5.9% | 23,935 | 7.5% | 321,371 |
| Kiowa | 196 | 23.4% | 621 | 74.1% | 21 | 2.5% | -425 | -50.7% | 838 |
| Kit Carson | 894 | 24.6% | 2,607 | 71.8% | 120 | 3.6% | -1,713 | -47.2% | 3,631 |
| La Plata | 15,903 | 51.9% | 12,678 | 41.4% | 2,057 | 6.7% | 3,225 | 10.5% | 30,638 |
| Lake | 1,704 | 54.2% | 1,174 | 37.3% | 267 | 8.5% | 530 | 16.9% | 3,145 |
| Larimer | 95,789 | 49.4% | 86,101 | 44.4% | 11,976 | 6.1% | 9,688 | 5.0% | 193,866 |
| Las Animas | 3,305 | 48.8% | 3,174 | 46.9% | 295 | 4.3% | 131 | 1.9% | 6,774 |
| Lincoln | 588 | 24.4% | 1,742 | 72.2% | 83 | 3.4% | -1,154 | -47.8% | 2,413 |
| Logan | 2,768 | 28.6% | 6,534 | 67.6% | 364 | 3.8% | -3,766 | -39.0% | 9,666 |
| Mesa | 24,109 | 31.2% | 48,559 | 62.8% | 4,600 | 6.0% | -24,450 | -31.6% | 77,268 |
| Mineral | 301 | 45.7% | 326 | 49.5% | 31 | 4.7% | -25 | -3.8% | 658 |
| Moffat | 1,338 | 20.9% | 4,786 | 74.8% | 271 | 4.2% | -3,448 | -53.9% | 6,395 |
| Montezuma | 4,305 | 34.2% | 7,484 | 59.4% | 810 | 6.4% | -3,179 | -25.2% | 12,599 |
| Montrose | 6,055 | 28.9% | 13,946 | 66.5% | 995 | 4.7% | -7,891 | -37.6% | 20,986 |
| Morgan | 3,910 | 32.9% | 7,516 | 63.3% | 448 | 3.8% | -3,606 | -30.4% | 11,874 |
| Otero | 3,651 | 42.8% | 4,561 | 53.5% | 321 | 3.7% | -910 | -10.7% | 8,533 |
| Ouray | 1,735 | 52.4% | 1,397 | 42.2% | 177 | 5.4% | 338 | 10.2% | 3,309 |
| Park | 3,722 | 35.9% | 5,937 | 57.2% | 718 | 6.8% | -2,215 | -21.3% | 10,377 |
| Phillips | 695 | 30.0% | 1,570 | 67.8% | 51 | 2.2% | -875 | -37.8% | 2,316 |
| Pitkin | 6,847 | 68.3% | 2,656 | 26.5% | 517 | 5.1% | 4,191 | 41.8% | 10,020 |
| Prowers | 1,648 | 33.3% | 3,110 | 62.9% | 187 | 3.8% | -1,462 | -29.6% | 4,945 |
| Pueblo | 40,475 | 52.0% | 33,051 | 42.5% | 4,293 | 5.6% | 7,424 | 9.5% | 77,819 |
| Rio Blanco | 600 | 17.8% | 2,641 | 78.3% | 144 | 4.1% | -2,041 | -60.5% | 3,375 |
| Rio Grande | 2,372 | 42.6% | 2,974 | 53.4% | 227 | 4.1% | -602 | -10.8% | 5,573 |
| Routt | 7,793 | 56.6% | 5,265 | 38.2% | 722 | 5.2% | 2,528 | 18.4% | 13,780 |
| Saguache | 1,570 | 55.1% | 1,042 | 36.6% | 237 | 8.4% | 528 | 16.5% | 2,849 |
| San Juan | 279 | 56.0% | 193 | 38.8% | 26 | 5.2% | 86 | 17.2% | 498 |
| San Miguel | 2,951 | 68.5% | 1,055 | 24.5% | 302 | 7.0% | 1,896 | 44.0% | 4,308 |
| Sedgwick | 426 | 31.8% | 863 | 64.4% | 51 | 3.8% | -437 | -32.6% | 1,340 |
| Summit | 9,536 | 59.9% | 5,178 | 32.5% | 1,200 | 7.5% | 4,358 | 27.4% | 15,914 |
| Teller | 4,064 | 28.4% | 9,547 | 66.6% | 719 | 5.0% | -5,483 | -38.2% | 14,330 |
| Washington | 527 | 19.5% | 2,092 | 77.4% | 83 | 3.1% | -1,565 | -57.9% | 2,702 |
| Weld | 52,263 | 38.9% | 74,843 | 55.7% | 7,277 | 5.5% | -22,580 | -16.8% | 134,383 |
| Yuma | 1,252 | 26.3% | 3,386 | 71.1% | 124 | 2.6% | -2,134 | -44.8% | 4,762 |
| Totals | 1,370,710 | 50.0% | 1,215,318 | 44.3% | 156,995 | 5.7% | 155,392 | 5.7% | 2,743,023 |

Counties that flipped from Democratic to Republican

- Chaffee (largest city: Salida)

==== By congressional district ====
Bennet won four of seven congressional districts, including one that elected a Republican.

| District | Bennet | Glenn | Representative |
|---|---|---|---|
| 1st | 69% | 26% | Diana DeGette |
| 2nd | 56% | 37% | Jared Polis |
| 3rd | 44% | 50% | Scott Tipton |
| 4th | 38% | 57% | Ken Buck |
| 5th | 36% | 58% | Doug Lamborn |
| 6th | 51% | 44% | Mike Coffman |
| 7th | 54% | 40% | Ed Perlmutter |
