= Shawn Mitchell =

American politician

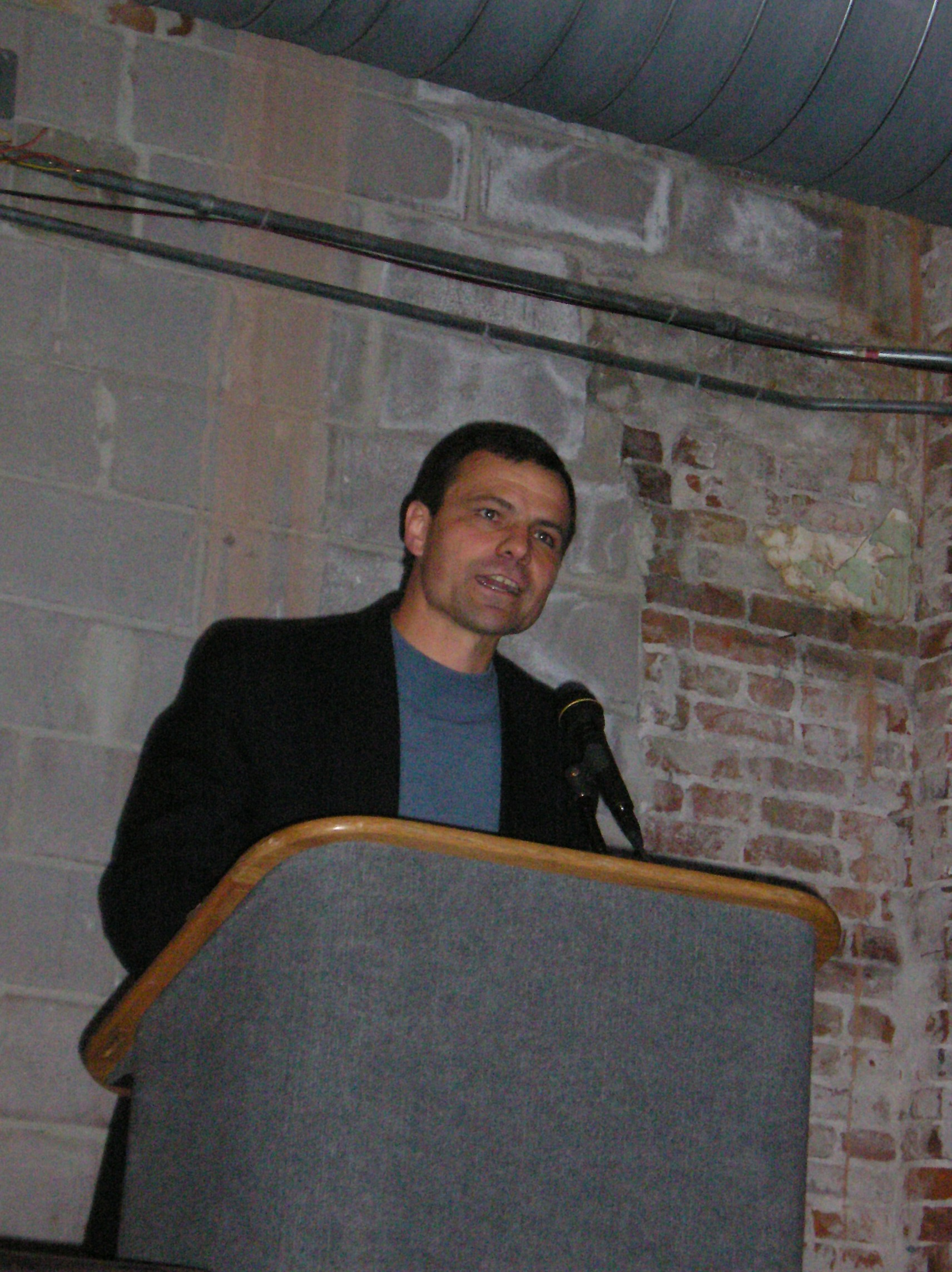

Member of the Colorado Senate from the 23rd district
- In office January 12, 2005 – January 7, 2013
- Succeeded by: Vicki Marble

Member of the Colorado House of Representatives from the 33rd district
- In office 1999–2004

Personal details
- Born: December 3, 1962 (age 63)
- Party: Republican
- Spouse: Yvette
- Profession: Attorney

Shawn D. Mitchell (born December 3, 1962) is a former Republican member of the Colorado Senate, representing the 23rd district from 2005 to 2013. Previously he was a member of the Colorado House of Representatives from 1999 to 2004.

== Background ==
Mitchell was born in 1962 in Mountain View, California. He received a B.S. magna cum laude from Brigham Young University and graduated from law school at the University of California at Berkeley.

He is now an attorney in a private law practice in Denver and Adams counties. Mitchell served as Special Counsel to the Colorado Attorney General, where he was a legal policy advisor and one of the top aides to former Colorado Attorney General Gale Norton. Mitchell participated in notable constitutional litigation, including Romer v. Evans, which challenged Amendment 2, as well as First Amendment cases concerning church-state separation. He also handled criminal appeals for the state in the Colorado Court of Appeals and the U.S. Supreme Court.

== Legislative career ==
Before serving in the senate, Mitchell served in the Colorado House of Representatives from 1999 to 2004. He was elected in 2004 to represent Senate District 23. Mitchell won his campaign for re-election against Joe Whitcomb in 2008. Term limited, he did not run for re-election in 2012.

== Controversy ==
Mitchell came under fire in 2010 for "sexist" and "degrading remarks". The comments were made at a formal hearing of the Workers' Compensation committee: Mitchell tried to comfort a nervous witness, by stating, "I just want to pass on a tip that sometimes when I'm in committee and I'm nervous I relieve that by imagining the chairwoman in her underwear."

According to news sources Mitchell apologized saying his remarks were "inappropriate" and "unprofessional". Senator Morgan Carroll accepted his apology.

== Private life ==
Mitchell has also written for the conservative website Townhall.com.. Mitchell is a former Senior Fellow at the Independence Institute, a conservative and free-market think tank in Denver. He continues to write and speak often on public policy issues. He has served as the president of the Colorado Chapter of the Federalist Society. He also served 3 years on the Denver Rocky Mountain News Board of Editorial Contributors.

Mitchell and his wife Yvette have seven children.
