= Yazmin Navarro =

American politician

Member of the Colorado State Board of Education from the 8th district
- Incumbent
- Assumed office January 1, 2025
- Preceded by: Rhonda Solis

Personal details
- Born: 1981 or 1982 (age 43–44) Mexicali, Baja California
- Party: Republican
- Education: University of Phoenix (BA); Grand Canyon University (MPA)

Yazmin Navarro is an American education official, educator, and former employee of United States diplomatic missions. A Republican, she has served on the Colorado State Board of Education representing Colorado's 8th congressional district since January 2025. She serves as vice-chairperson of the board."Board Member Yazmin Navarro (R)". Colorado Department of Education."State Board Members". Colorado Department of Education.

== Early life and education ==
Navarro immigrated to the United States from Mexico. She has described growing up in a low-income household and attending public schools in different parts of the United States.Strandquist, Sonja (January 9, 2025). "Yazmin Navarro—Fighting for the 'American Dream' and better schools". Berthoud Weekly Surveyor. Navarro earned a bachelor's degree in English in 2012 and a master's degree in public administration in 2015. Her professional biography with the Colorado Department of Education states that she was the first person in her immediate and extended family to graduate from high school and attend college.

== Career ==
=== Education ===
Navarro has worked in education with students including English-language learners, gifted and talented students, students with disabilities, and at-risk youth. BallotReady lists her previous positions as an academic coach at GOAL Academy from 2012 to 2014 and as an English Language Learner coordinator."Yazmin Navarro". BallotReady. In 2023, Navarro ran for the District D seat on the Thompson R2-J School District Board of Education. She lost the election to Denise Alvine Chapman."2023 Coordinated Election Results" (PDF). Larimer County. November 16, 2023.

=== U.S. diplomatic service ===
Navarro worked for the United States Department of State and at U.S. diplomatic missions overseas. BallotReady lists her as having worked at the U.S. Embassy in San Salvador in biometrics from 2019 to 2020 and identifies the U.S. State Department among her previous employers. She later worked at the U.S. Consulate General in Naples, Italy. Navarro was one of the contributors to a 2022 State Magazine article about the consulate's work in southern Italy.Avery, M.; Cea, A.; Lobdell, C.; Peña Navarro, Y.; Schellenger, H.; Schinnerer, K.; Servent, A. (March 2022). "Naples: Consulate team advances U.S. interests in idyllic region". State Magazine. United States Department of State.

== Colorado State Board of Education ==
Navarro was the Republican candidate for the Colorado State Board of Education seat representing the state's 8th Congressional District in the 2024 election."2024 General Election – State Board of Education District 8". Colorado Secretary of State. November 5, 2024. She defeated Democratic incumbent Rhonda Solis in the general election. The Berthoud Weekly Surveyor reported the result as approximately 52 percent for Navarro and 48 percent for Solis. Navarro was sworn into office on January 8, 2025. During the ceremony, she took the oath of office in English and Spanish; the Colorado Department of Education described her as the first board member in recent memory to take a bilingual oath."Colorado State Board of Education welcomes four new members". Colorado Department of Education. January 8, 2025. Her term runs from January 2025 through January 2031. Navarro serves as vice-chairperson of the State Board of Education. She also serves on the Gifted Education State Advisory Committee."Committee Service 2026". Colorado Department of Education. During her 2024 campaign and following her election, Navarro discussed issues including academic achievement, parental involvement, school choice, teacher support, and an emphasis on reading, writing and mathematics.

== Publications ==
Navarro was a contributing author of the 2022 State Magazine article "Naples: Consulate team advances U.S. interests in idyllic region", published by the U.S. Department of State. Her résumé also lists an internal Standard Operating Procedures for Advisory Opinions produced while she worked at the U.S. Embassy in San Salvador.

== Awards ==
The Colorado Department of Education lists Navarro as a recipient of the President's Award for Educational Excellence and the U.S. Department of State's Franklin Award.

== See also ==
• Colorado State Board of Education • Colorado's 8th congressional district
