= Tonya Van Beber =

American politician

Member of the Colorado House of Representatives from the 48th district
- In office January 13, 2021 – January 9, 2023
- Preceded by: Stephen Humphrey
- Succeeded by: Gabe Evans

Personal details
- Party: Republican
- Spouse: Jeff
- Children: Scott
- Website: Campaign website

Tonya Van Beber is an American politician and former state representative from unincorporated Weld County near Eaton. A Republican, Van Beber represented Colorado House of Representatives District 48, which included all or parts of the Weld County communities of Ault, Eaton, Gilcrest, Greeley, Johnstown, La Salle, Milliken, and Pierce.

== Background ==
Van Beber owns an excavation company with her husband Jeff and was a teacher at University Schools, a charter school in Greeley, Colorado. She also does educational consulting across the country through her company, School Success Systems. A third-generation Coloradan, she previously worked for the Greeley Tribune and later published two direct-mail newspapers in Weld County. In 2018, Van Beber was elected to an at-large seat on the Weld County Council and has served as the council president.

She earned a bachelor's degree in Social Sciences/Psychology from the University of Northern Colorado. In 2013, she earned a master's degree in educational leadership from Regis University in Denver.

== Elections ==
Van Beber was first elected to the Colorado House of Representatives in the 2020 general election. In the June 2020 Republican house district 48 primary, she defeated opponent Grady Nouis, winning 55.99% of the votes.

In the 2020 general election, Van Beber defeated her Democratic Party opponent, winning 66.71% of the total votes cast.

In the 2022 Colorado elections, Van Beber sought the Republican nomination for Colorado's 1st Senate district. However, at the Senate District 1 assembly held in spring 2022, she failed to meet the 30% vote benchmark to appear on the ballot.
