= 2022 Colorado State Treasurer election =

- November 8, 2022
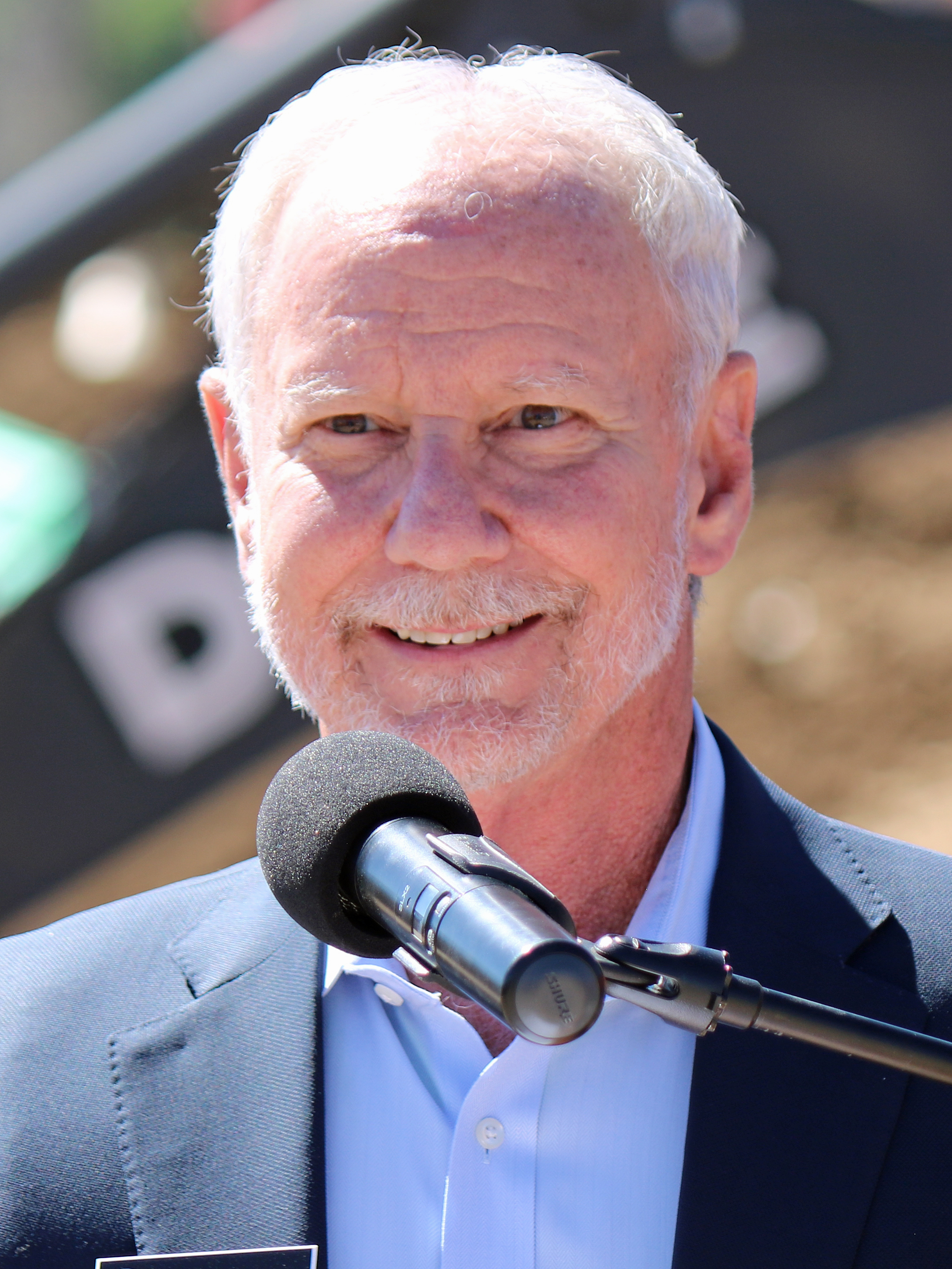

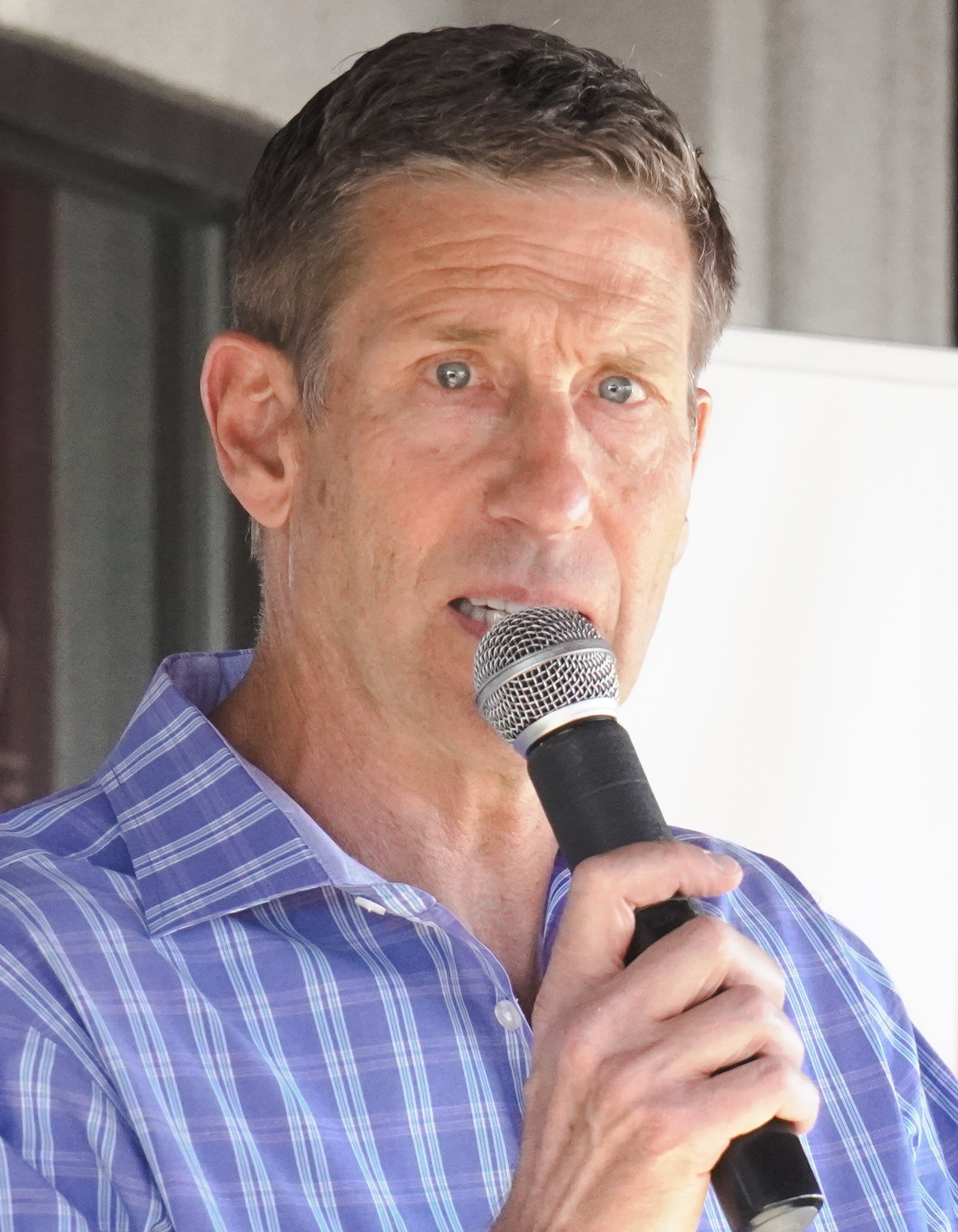
Nominee	Dave Young	Lang Sias
Party	Democratic	Republican
Popular vote	1,312,705	1,052,337
Percentage	53.67%	43.03%
- Young: 40–50% 50–60% 60–70% 70–80% 80–90% >90% Sias: 40–50% 50–60% 60–70% 70–80% 80–90% >90% Tie: 40–50% No votes
State Treasurer before election
Dave Young
Democratic
Elected State Treasurer
Dave Young
Democratic

The 2022 Colorado State Treasurer election took place on November 8, 2022, to elect the Colorado State Treasurer. Incumbent Democratic Treasurer Dave Young won re-election to a second term, improving on his 2018 results.

== Democratic primary ==
=== Candidates ===
==== Nominee ====
- Dave Young, incumbent state treasurer

=== Results ===
Democratic primary results
Party	Candidate	Votes	%
Democratic	Dave Young (incumbent)	499,229	100.0%
Total votes		499,229	100.0%

== Republican primary ==
=== Candidates ===
==== Nominee ====
- Lang Sias, former state representative from the 27th district (2015–2019) and Republican nominee for lieutenant governor in 2018

=== Endorsements ===
Lang Sias

U.S. Representatives

- Mike Coffman, mayor of Aurora, former U.S. Representative from Colorado's 6th congressional district (2009–2019), former state treasurer (1999–2005, 2006–2007)

Governors

- Bill Owens, former Governor of Colorado (1999–2007), former state treasurer (1995–1999)

State treasurers

- Mark Hillman, former state treasurer (2005–2006)
- Walker Stapleton, former state treasurer (2011–2019)

=== Results ===
Republican primary results
Party	Candidate	Votes	%
Republican	Lang Sias	502,175	100.0%
Total votes		502,175	100.0%

== General election ==
=== Forum & Debate ===
2022 Colorado State Treasurer forum & debate
No.	Date	Host	Moderator	Link	Republican	Democratic
Key: P Participant A Absent N Not invited I Invited W Withdrawn						
Key: P Participant A Absent N Not invited I Invited W Withdrawn					Lang Sias	Dave Young
1	Oct. 18, 2022	League of Women Voters of Colorado	Jo Ann Allen	YouTube	P	P
2	Oct. 19, 2022	KUSA (TV)	Kyle Clark; Marshall Zelinger		P	P

=== Polling ===
Hypothetical polling

Dave Young vs. generic Republican

Poll source	Date(s) administered	Sample size (Note: Key: A – all adults RV – registered voters LV – likely voters V – unclear)	Margin of error	Dave Young (D)	Generic Republican	Undecided
Cygnal (R) (Note: This poll was sponsored by Ready Colorado)	January 12–13, 2022	630 (LV)	± 3.9%	41%	42%	17%

=== Results ===
2022 Colorado State Treasurer election
Party	Candidate	Votes	%	±%
Democratic	Dave Young (incumbent)	1,312,705	53.67%	+1.44%
Republican	Lang Sias	1,052,337	43.03%	−1.90%
Libertarian	Anthony J. Delgado	80,770	3.30%	N/A
Total votes		2,445,812	100.0%	
Democratic hold				

==== By county ====
County	Dave Young Democratic		Lang Sias Republican		Anthony Delgado Libertarian	
County	#	%	#	%	#	%
Adams	91,273	55.42%	66,531	40.39%	6,901	4.19%
Alamosa	2,758	47.97%	2,742	47.69%	250	4.35%
Arapahoe	146,297	58.07%	98,126	38.95%	7,518	2.98%
Archuleta	3,135	41.73%	4,093	54.48%	285	3.79%
Baca	314	18.70%	1,296	77.19%	69	4.11%
Bent	566	31.94%	1,123	63.37%	83	4.68%
Boulder	122,075	75.61%	35,292	21.86%	4,081	2.53%
Broomfield	22,495	61.15%	13,312	36.19%	979	2.66%
Chaffee	6,147	54.27%	4,796	42.34%	384	3.39%
Cheyenne	107	12.09%	757	85.54%	21	2.37%
Clear Creek	2,798	55.18%	2,054	40.50%	219	4.32%
Conejos	1,507	44.59%	1,727	51.09%	146	4.32%
Costilla	1,006	62.25%	493	30.51%	117	7.24%
Crowley	361	27.33%	892	67.52%	68	5.15%
Custer	1,006	30.67%	2,164	65.98%	110	3.35%
Delta	4,876	31.34%	10,133	65.14%	547	3.52%
Denver	212,508	77.49%	54,162	19.75%	7,566	2.76%
Dolores	310	24.62%	891	70.77%	58	4.61%
Douglas	78,875	42.50%	101,807	54.85%	4,924	2.65%
Eagle	12,664	59.24%	7,972	37.29%	743	3.48%
El Paso	113,492	41.03%	153,352	55.44%	9,782	3.54%
Elbert	3,509	22.27%	11,771	74.71%	475	3.01%
Fremont	12,631	64.81%	6,155	31.58%	702	3.60%
Garfield	11,866	49.63%	11,029	46.13%	1,012	4.23%
Gilpin	1,818	54.25%	1,389	41.45%	144	4.30%
Grand	3,603	46.38%	3,802	48.94%	363	4.67%
Gunnison	5,441	61.67%	3,049	34.56%	333	3.77%
Hinsdale	185	38.54%	273	56.88%	22	4.58%
Huerfano	1,871	49.51%	1,722	45.57%	186	4.92%
Jackson	132	20.15%	494	75.42%	29	4.43%
Jefferson	164,956	56.33%	118,425	40.44%	9,469	3.23%
Kiowa	101	14.01%	601	83.36%	19	2.64%
Kit Carson	488	16.89%	2,312	80.03%	89	3.08%
La Plata	16,382	56.80%	11,334	39.30%	1,126	3.90%
Lake	1,706	58.77%	1,029	35.45%	168	5.79%
Larimer	96,852	55.55%	72,077	41.34%	5,424	3.11%
Las Animas	3,041	46.73%	3,198	49.15%	268	4.12%
Lincoln	363	17.52%	1,624	78.38%	85	4.10%
Logan	1,807	22.56%	5,899	73.64%	305	3.81%
Mesa	25,504	35.72%	42,828	59.99%	3,064	4.29%
Mineral	278	42.12%	359	54.39%	23	3.48%
Moffat	974	18.56%	4,068	77.52%	206	3.93%
Montezuma	4,715	38.35%	7,141	58.09%	438	3.56%
Montrose	6,480	31.71%	13,287	65.03%	666	3.26%
Morgan	2,561	25.89%	6,988	70.65%	342	3.46%
Otero	2,749	38.47%	4,071	56.97%	326	4.56%
Ouray	2,053	58.94%	1,337	38.39%	93	2.67%
Park	4,030	40.71%	5,433	54.88%	436	4.40%
Phillips	361	19.12%	1,460	77.33%	67	3.55%
Pitkin	6,529	71.09%	2,354	25.63%	301	3.28%
Prowers	1,107	26.63%	2,903	69.83%	147	3.54%
Pueblo	32,672	49.62%	30,235	45.92%	2,941	4.47%
Rio Blanco	469	15.99%	2,365	80.61%	100	3.41%
Rio Grande	1,920	39.69%	2,665	55.08%	253	5.23%
Routt	7,919	59.97%	4,824	36.53%	461	3.49%
Saguache	1,456	54.84%	1,075	40.49%	124	4.67%
San Juan	334	64.60%	164	31.72%	19	3.68%
San Miguel	2,888	72.84%	935	23.58%	142	3.58%
Sedgwick	255	23.31%	794	72.58%	45	4.11%
Summit	8,639	65.09%	4,084	30.77%	550	4.14%
Teller	4,149	31.08%	8,810	66.00%	390	2.92%
Washington	316	13.63%	1,913	82.53%	89	3.84%
Weld	48,788	38.73%	72,829	57.81%	4,359	3.46%
Yuma	713	18.41%	3,041	78.54%	118	3.05%
Totals	1,312,705	53.67%	1,052,337	43.03%	80,770	3.30%

Counties that flipped from Republican to Democratic

- Garfield (largest city: Rifle)

==== By congressional district ====
Young won five of eight congressional districts.

District	Young	Sias	Representative
1st	77%	20%	Diana DeGette
2nd	67%	30%	Joe Neguse
3rd	45%	51%	Lauren Boebert
4th	38%	59%	Ken Buck
5th	41%	55%	Doug Lamborn
6th	58%	39%	Jason Crow
7th	55%	42%	Ed Perlmutter (117th Congress)
7th	55%	42%	Brittany Pettersen (118th Congress)
8th	50%	46%	Yadira Caraveo

== Notes ==
Partisan clients
