= Jim Riesberg =

American politician

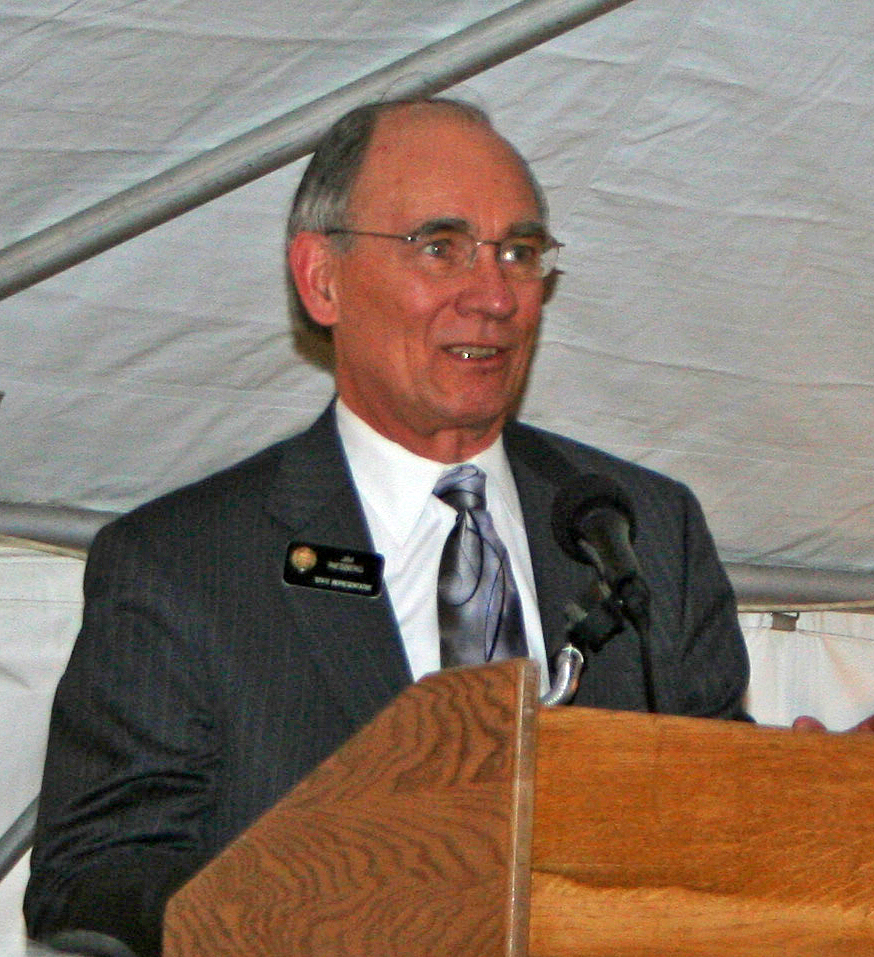
- Reisberg in 2007.

Member of the Colorado House of Representatives from the 50th district
- In office January 12, 2005 – June 30, 2011
- Preceded by: Pamela Groeger
- Succeeded by: Dave Young

Personal details
- Born: April 4, 1942 (age 84) Denver, Colorado, U.S.
- Party: Democratic
- Spouse: Sharron
- Profession: Gerontologist

James Riesberg (born April 4, 1942) is a former Colorado Insurance Commissioner. He was appointed to the position by Colorado Governor John Hickenlooper on June 27, 2011, and joined the Division on July 1, 2011. He resigned in 2013. Riesberg is also a former Colorado legislator. Elected to the Colorado House of Representatives as a Democrat in 2004, Riesberg represented House District 50, which encompassed eastern Greeley and Evans, Colorado.

== 2008 election ==
In December 2007, Riesberg announced that he would seek a third term in the legislature in the 2008 legislative elections. Riesberg was unanimously nominated for a second term by Weld County Democrats in March 2008;

== 2008 legislative session ==
In the 2008 session of the Colorado General Assembly, Riesberg sat on the House Appropriations Committee and the House Health and Human Services Committee, and was vice-chairman of the Joint Capital Development Committee. In the 2010 session of the Colorado General Assembly, Riesberg sat on the House Appropriations Committee and the House Health and Environment Committee.

== 2010 election ==
In 2010, Riesberg was elected to his fourth term as State House Representative to District 50.

== 2018 primary election ==
In 2018, Riesberg ran for the Democratic party nomination to the State House District 50 race. He lost this race to challenger Rochelle Galindo, 57 percent to 43 percent.
