= Senator Durham =

Senator Durham may refer to:

- Israel Wilson Durham (1855–1909), Pennsylvania State Senate
- Steven J. Durham (fl. 1970s–2010s), Colorado State Senate
