= Senator Marble =

Senator Marble may refer to:

- Sebastian Streeter Marble (1817–1902), Maine State Senate
- Vicki Marble (born 1952), Colorado State Senate
