= Mary Young (politician) =

American politician

Member of the Colorado House of Representatives from the 50th district
- In office June 2, 2019 – January 8, 2025
- Preceded by: Rochelle Galindo
- Succeeded by: Ryan Gonzalez

Personal details
- Born: 1950 or 1951 (age 75–76)
- Party: Democratic
- Spouse: Dave Young
- Education: St. Mary's College (BA); University of Northern Colorado (PhD)
- Website: Official website Campaign website

Mary Young (born 1950 or 1951) is an American politician, psychologist, and special education teacher from the state of Colorado. A Democrat, Young represented the 50th district of the Colorado House of Representatives, based in Greeley, from June 2019 to January 2025.

== Career ==
From 1973 until 2001, Young worked as a special education teacher, initially in Romeoville, Illinois before moving to Weld County, Colorado. After getting a PhD in psychology in 2000, Young began working as a school psychologist, which she continues to do.

== Political career ==
In 2018, 50th district incumbent – and Young's husband – Dave Young ran successfully for Colorado State Treasurer, and was succeeded in the State House by fellow Democrat Rochelle Galindo. Galindo resigned only 5 months into her term, however, after being accused of sexual misconduct and providing alcohol to a minor.

That June, a Weld County Democratic vacancy committee met to determine Galindo's successor. Young won 6 of the committee's 9 votes, while Greeley-Evans school board member Rhonda Solis received 3; four other candidates applied but received no votes. Young assumed office immediately. She was re-elected in 2020 and 2022. Young ran for re-election again in 2024. In the Democratic primary election held June 25, 2024, she ran unopposed. In the general election held November 5, 2024, Young was defeated by Republican candidate Ryan Gonzalez.

=== Tenure ===
In the 2021-2022 legislative sessions, Young sat in the Public & Behavioral Health & Human Services Committee and was vice-chair of the Education Committee. In the 2022 legislative session, Young sponsored bills which aimed at improving supportive learning, special education, mental health, reducing license fees and other similar measures. For the 2023-2024 Legislative Sessions, Young sat on the same committees however became the Vice-Chair of the Public & Behavioral Health & Human Services Committee. In September 2022, the Colorado Behavioral Health Council recognized Young for her legislative work on behavioral health.

== Personal life ==
Young lives in Greeley with her husband Dave. She is a school psychologist. Young is also a co-guardian of her sister-in-law after a liver transplant.
