= Colorado's 23rd Senate district =

American legislative district

Colorado's 23rd State Senate district
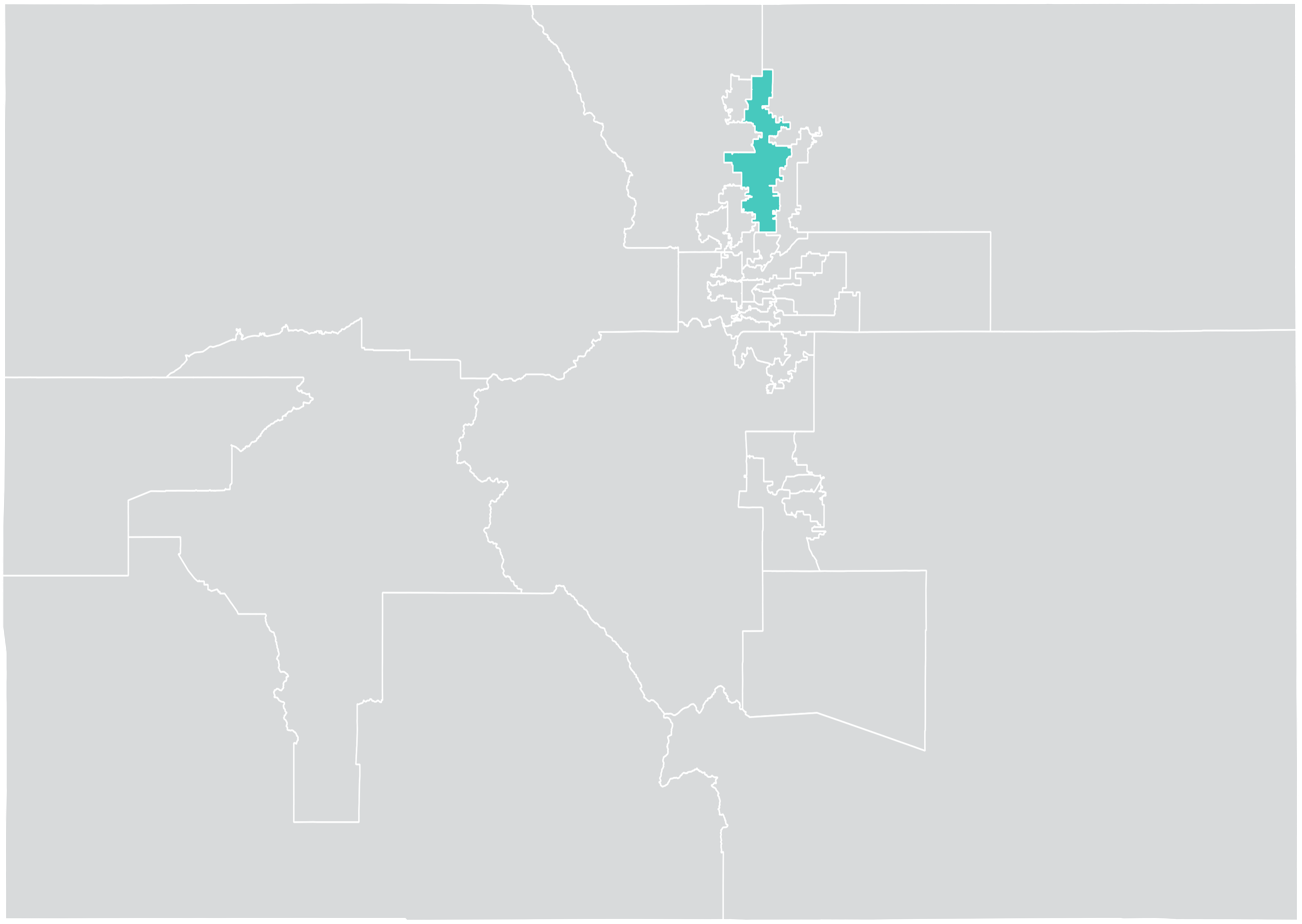
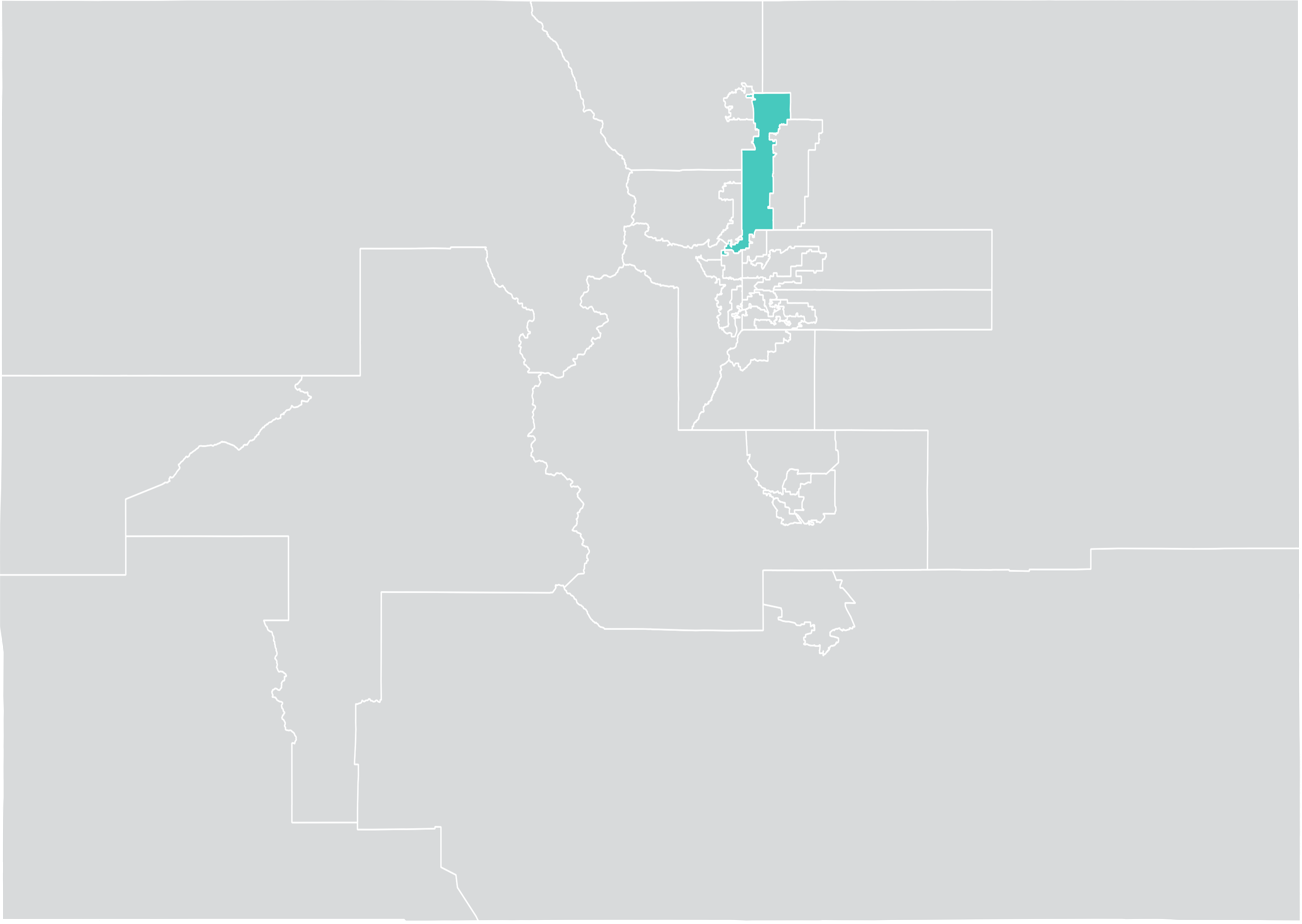
Senator
Barbara Kirkmeyer; R–Brighton
- Registration: 31.3% Republican; 17.3% Democratic; 49.2% No party preference
- Demographics: 80% White; 1% Black; 13% Hispanic; 4% Asian; 2% Other
- Population (2018): 181,648
- Registered voters: 152,976

Colorado's 23rd Senate district is one of 35 districts in the Colorado Senate. It has been represented by Republican Barbara Kirkmeyer since 2021.

== Geography ==
District 23 covers the City of Broomfield and parts of Larimer and Weld Counties on the outskirts of Fort Collins and Greeley. Communities in the district other than Broomfield include Timnath, Windsor, Mead, Severance, Firestone, Frederick, Dacono, and parts of Berthoud, Johnstown, and Erie.

The district is split between Colorado's 2nd, 4th congressional district, and 8th congressional districts and overlaps with the 19th, 48th, 49th, 52nd, 53rd, 63rd, 64th, and 65th districts of the Colorado House of Representatives.

== Recent election results ==
Colorado state senators are elected to staggered four-year terms; under normal circumstances, the 23rd district holds elections in presidential years.

=== 2020 ===
2020 Colorado State Senate election, District 23
Primary election
Party	Candidate	Votes	%
Republican	Barbara Kirkmeyer	15,209	55.2
Republican	Rupert Parchment	12,326	44.8
Total votes		27,535	100
Democratic	Sally Boccella	16,649	55.6
Democratic	Galina Nicoll	13,295	44.4
Total votes		29,944	100
General election
Republican	Barbara Kirkmeyer	71,570	55.1
Democratic	Sally Boccella	58,227	44.9
Total votes		129,797	100
Republican hold			

=== 2016 ===
2016 Colorado State Senate election, District 23
Party	Candidate	Votes	%
Republican	Vicki Marble (incumbent)	55,528	58.0
Democratic	T.J. Cole	40,281	42.0
Total votes		95,809	100
Republican hold			

=== 2012 ===
2012 Colorado State Senate election, District 23
Primary election
Party	Candidate	Votes	%
Republican	Vicki Marble	5,500	58.0
Republican	Glenn Vaad	3,981	42.0
Total votes		9,481	100
General election
Republican	Vicki Marble	43,949	56.2
Democratic	Lee Kemp	34,252	43.8
Total votes		78,201	100
Republican hold			

=== Federal and statewide results ===
Year	Office	Results
2020	President	Trump 49.2 – 48%
2018	Governor	Stapleton 50.8 – 45.5%
2016	President	Trump 50.2 – 40.5%
2014	Senate	Gardner 56.1 – 38.4%
2014	Governor	Beauprez 54.0 – 41.7%
2012	President	Romney 53.4 – 44.2%
