= Arn Menconi =

American social justice advocate

Arn Menconi (born 1959 in Chicago, Illinois) was the Green Party candidate in the 2016 United States Senate election in Colorado. He was on the ballot for the November 2016 election in Colorado.

Menconi served two terms on the county commission of Eagle County, Colorado. He is also the founder and former Executive Director of a national youth development charity SOS Outreach. He earned his M.B.A. at the University of Denver, Colorado and undergraduate in Communications at DePaul University in Chicago, Illinois.

== Early life and education ==
After moving to Vail, Colorado in 1991, He started working at a ski rental shop in Avon with a bunch of local high school students. Arn saw a need for the snowboarding community to reach out to those who would not otherwise have an opportunity to visit the mountains. A fully certified snowboard instructor through the American Association of Snowboard Instructors, Menconi produced the largest amateur snowboard series for ten years through SOS. Menconi is also President of Vail Velo, the Vail Valley's biking club.

== SOS Outreach ==
Menconi is the Founder and Executive Director of SOS Outreach, formerly the Snowboard Outreach Society, the county's largest winter sports-based youth developmental agency. The mission of SOS Outreach is to build character in underserved and underprivileged youth to enhance decision-making for healthy and successful life experiences. Headquartered in Vail, Colorado and founded in 1993, SOS teaches over 3000 kids each year at 30 ski resorts in the United States.

== Political career ==
In 2000, Menconi was elected to the Board of County Commissioners in Eagle County, Colorado as a Democrat. He was reelected to his second term in 2004 and term limited in 2008. He held many board positions on local economic, environmental and social capital posts and state and national designations. For six years he was the Vice Chair of the Colorado Counties, inc. Health and Human Services Committee and a board member of the National Association for Counties' Human Services board.

He is the co-founder of the Eagle County Economics Council, a local economic development group.

Menconi created the Eco Sports website, the county's only online mapping chamber for counties to showcase their recreational opportunities. Menconi's term was considered controversial by many. He advocated for a social justice focus by creating sustainable growth management, affordable housing, budget analysis leveraging social programs and early childhood development. Twice conservatives tried to recall him without success and his first opponent accused him of having snowboarders from a neighboring county illegally vote for him. Menconi is looking forward to spending more time with his family and with SOS Outreach upon his term limit at the end of 2008.

In 2016, Menconi switched his party affiliation from the Democratic Party to the Green Party. Also in 2016, he announced his candidacy for U.S. Senate in the state of Colorado, challenging Democratic incumbent Michael Bennet, who is running for a second term in the Senate.

In August, Menconi officially endorsed Jill Stein, the Green Party presidential nominee, in the 2016 election.

In 2018, Menconi switched his affiliation back to the Democratic Party and ran for the Democratic Nomination for the United States House of Representatives for Colorado's 3rd District. In the primaries, he placed 3rd with 8.2% of the vote behind Karl Hanlon and Diane Mitsch Bush.

In 2020, Menconi ran as a Democrat for the Colorado State Senate from Senate District 8. Menconi placed 2nd with 44.2% of the vote behind Karl Hanlon who became the Democratic Nominee.

== Early childhood development and environmental activism ==
In 2006, Menconi led a tax increase proposal to raise funds for early childhood development that lost at the polls. Menconi created a subsequent county-funded million dollar program that was the first early childcare program to bring together all four areas of early childhood — education, health, special needs and family resources.

Menconi helped to bring permanent funding for open space and placed thousands of areas into preservation. He led the successful campaign to acquire the two largest open space parcels in Eagle County. Working with a multi-generational ranching family and community activists, prevailed over a two-year period to save a pristine 4,000-acre (16 km^{2}) parcel of ranch land that serves as the gateway to Glenwood Canyon. Menconi actively supported a public-private partnership to preserve a 70-acre (280,000 m^{2}) parcel of prime Eagle River land in the heart of the county's most populated area.

== Social life and family ==
Menconi speaks on various topics of social justice, land use, non-profit leadership and sports-based youth development. He is the father of two children, Maya Rose and Matteo. In addition to snowboarding, he is an avid cyclist and has competed in over a dozen 100-mile (160 km) mountain bike races. He currently lives in Vail, Colorado.
