= Peggy Littleton =

American politician

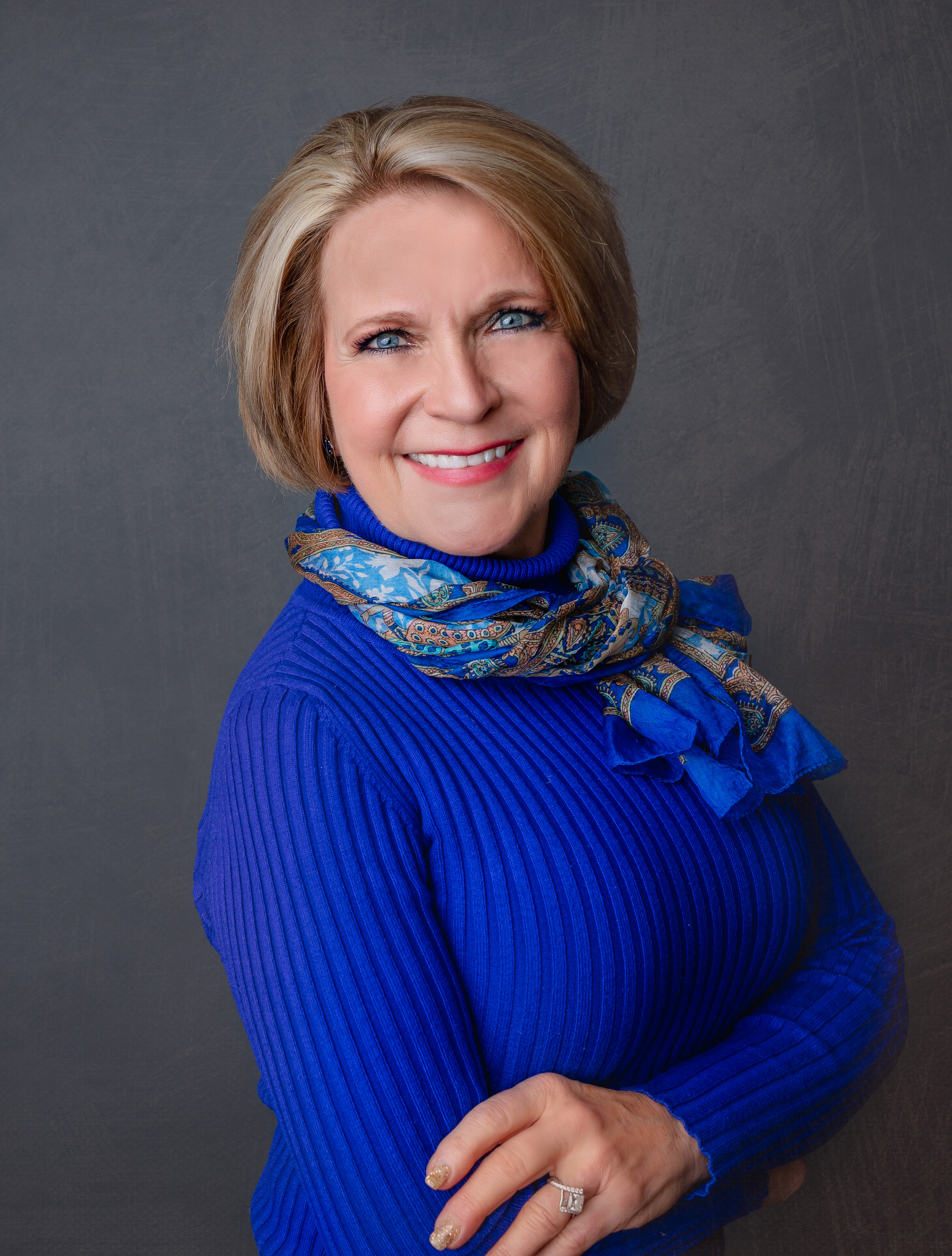

El Paso County Commissioner
- In office January 11, 2011 – January 2019
- Preceded by: Jim Bensberg

Colorado State Board of Education
- In office 2004 Excelsior University – 2010

Personal details
- Born: Sidney, Nebraska, U.S.
- Party: Republican
- Education: Colorado State University; Regents College (B.S.)

Peggy Littleton (Propst) is an American candidate for Colorado State Board of Education, Congressional District 8. She is considered a prominent figure in Colorado politics, particularly known for her tenure as a county commissioner for El Paso County. She has been an advocate for conservative values and has actively participated in the Republican Party at both local and state levels.

Propst (Littleton) was elected to the State Board of Education in November 2004 to serve Colorado's Congressional District. She won a six-year term with 62 percent of the vote. After her State Board of Education term expired in 2010, Propst (Littleton) ran successfully for a county commissioner seat and was re-elected in 2014.

Propst became a candidate for the United States Senate January 20, 2016. Propst was hoping to unseat Sen. Michael Bennet, Democrat-Colorado, whom national media had identified among the more vulnerable Democrats in 2016.

== Early life and personal ==
Propst was born in Sidney, Nebraska, and moved to Fort Morgan, Colorado, when she was 4. Propst grew up in Longmont, Colorado a Boulder County municipality neighboring the college town of Boulder which is known for progressive politics and culture. Her father was a union member and equipment maintenance worker with AT&T for 30 years; her mother a teacher. After graduation from High School, Propst spent a year abroad as a Rotary Youth Exchange student in Austria. She has lived in Colorado Springs since the summer of 1993.

== Political experience ==
Propst was elected to the Colorado State Board of Education in 2004, nine months after being elected to fill a vacancy. She won with 178,561 votes, which was 62 percent of votes cast in an election with participation of 90 percent of registered voters. After completing a six-year term, she ran for the El Paso County Board of Commissioners.

Propst was elected as commissioner for El Paso County's District 5 in 2010 and was sworn into office January 11, 2011. Propst was reelected in 2014 by 64 percent of the vote in a contest with Democratic challenger Jariah Walker.

== Sheriff controversy ==
Propst was the first county commissioner to call for the resignation of embattled El Paso County Sheriff Terry Maketa, who subsequently left office amid allegations and lawsuits that claimed he created a hostile work environment and had affairs with subordinates. One employment complaint claimed the sheriff used female employees as "sexual playthings" who were rewarded with promotions for sexual favors.

== Term limit reinstatement ==
Prior to Propst's first election as county commissioner, public controversy erupted after El Paso County Commissioners placed what was criticized as deliberately misleading language on the 2010 ballot. The measure asked whether county officials should be limited to three terms. After the measure passed, some voters claimed they were duped. Commissioners were already limited to two terms and critics claimed an extension of terms was written to appear as a reduction. Upon assuming office in 2011, Propst fought to put the question to voters again with less confusing language. Voters in 2011 restored the limitation of two terms.

== Career ==
Propst (Littleton) taught at Cheyenne Mountain Charter Academy and Colorado Springs Christian Schools.

Propst (Littleton) was appointed director of the Colorado GEAR UP grant, which was administered by the office of Republican Gov. Bill Owens. Colorado GEAR UP is the state's program to prepare low-income and first generation students for college.

As an educational consultant, Propst (Littleton) has conducted professional staff development seminars for teachers nationwide. She has worked as a consultant with Gibson Hasbrouck & Associates. Her focus is training teachers to combine data-driven and differentiated instruction in the classroom.

Propst (Littleton) is a licensed Realtor.

== Gubernatorial appointments ==
- Homeland Security and All-Hazards Advisory Council
- Coroners Training and Standards Board

== Boards, committees, and commissions service ==
- Chairman for the Imagine Classical Academy in Colorado Springs
- Vice Chairman for the Classical Academy (TCA)
- Read to Achieve
- The Dyslexia Center
- PACE (Parental Alliance for Choice in Education)
- National Association of Justice and Public Safety Steering Committee
- Pikes Peak Rural Transportation Authority Board of Directors
- El Paso County Board of Retirement
- El Paso-Teller County 911 Authority Board
- El Paso County Emergency Services Agency
- Pikes Peak Library Board
- Liaison to the Offices of the Sheriff and Clerk and Recorder

== Awards and publications ==
- Granted the Charter Friend Award for Policy
- State Board of Education resolution recognizing contributions to Colorado children and children of military personnel
- Contributor to reports published by the National Association of State Boards of Education NASBE, some of which are "E Pluribus Unum (ELL)," "Adolescent Literacy," and "From Planning to Practice (ECE)."

== Education ==
Upon return from Austria, Propst (Littleton) enrolled at Colorado State University. After her junior year, Propst (Littleton) completed her Bachelor of Science degree with Regents College of the University of the State of New York (now Excelsior University) in Albany, New York.
