= Stephen Humphrey =

American politician

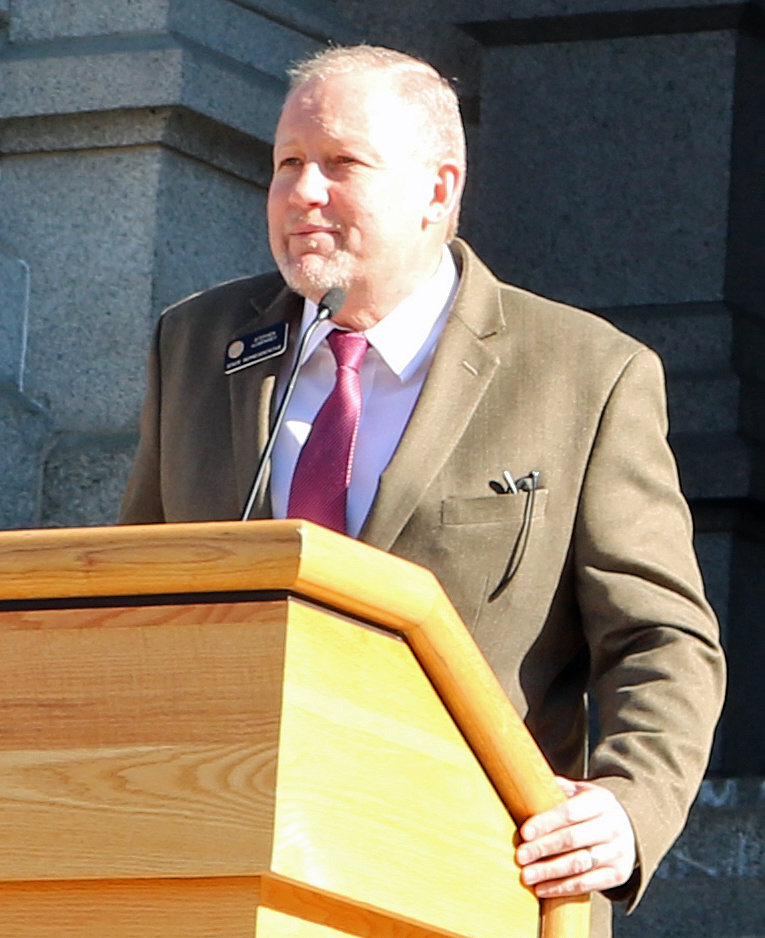
- Humphrey addressing an audience in 2017.

Member of the Colorado House of Representatives from the 48th district
- In office January 9, 2013 – January 13, 2021
- Preceded by: Glenn Vaad
- Succeeded by: Tonya Van Beber

Personal details
- Party: Republican
- Education: Pepperdine University
- Website: humphreyforhouse.org

Stephen A. Humphrey is an American politician and a former Republican member of the Colorado House of Representatives. He represented District 48 from January 9, 2013, to January 13, 2021.

== Education and political career ==
Humphrey earned his master's degree in clinical psychology from Pepperdine University.

In the aftermath of the 2020 presidential election, on December 7, 2020, Humphrey and 7 other Republicans demanded to the Speaker of the House KC Becker that a committee be formed on "election integrity" to conduct an audit of the Dominion Voting Systems used in Colorado's 2020 elections in spite of no evidence of issues. The request was rejected, with Becker criticizing it as a promotion of "debunked conspiracy theories."

== Elections ==
- 2012 When District 48 incumbent Republican Representative Glenn Vaad ran for Colorado Senate, Humphrey ran in the June 26, 2012 Republican Primary, winning with 3,920 votes (56.9%); and won the November 6, 2012 General election with 25,779 votes (74.4%) against Democratic nominee John Gibson.
