= Lang Sias =

American politician

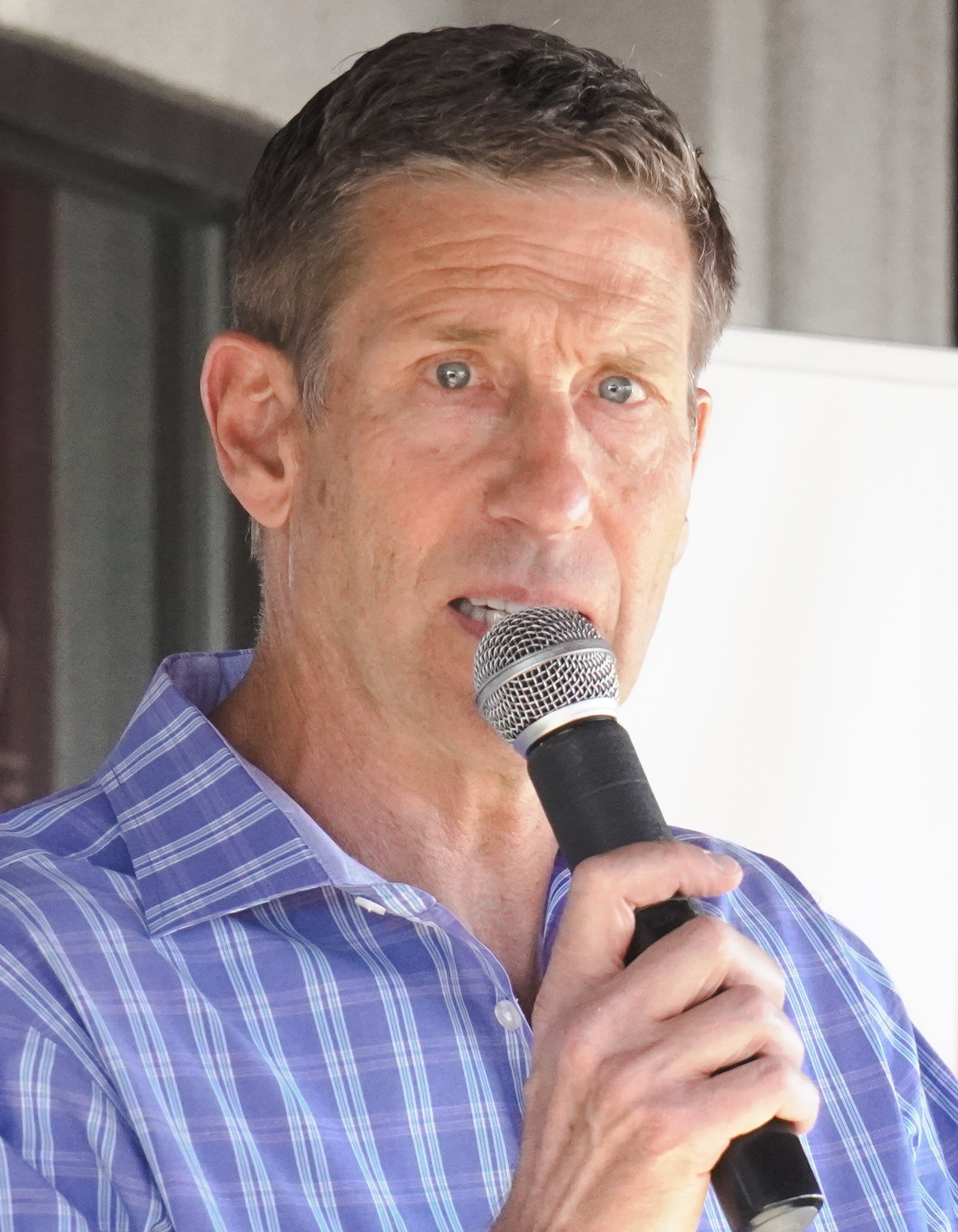

Member of the Colorado House of Representatives from the 27th district
- In office February 4, 2015 – January 4, 2019
- Preceded by: Libby Szabo
- Succeeded by: Brianna Titone

Personal details
- Born: Langhorne Cowles Sias; 1959 (age 66–67) Wilton, Connecticut, U.S.
- Party: Republican (2007–present)
- Other political affiliations: Independent (Before 2003, 2006–2007); Democratic (2003–2006)
- Spouse: Rene
- Education: Vassar College (AB); London School of Economics (MS); University of Michigan, Ann Arbor (JD)
- Website: Official website

Military service
- Allegiance: United States
- Branch/service: United States Navy
- Years of service: 1986–1998
- Rank: Lieutenant Colonel

Langhorne Cowles Sias (born 1959) is an American politician who represented House District 27 in the Colorado House of Representatives. A vacancy committee appointed Sias to the office after his predecessor resigned, and he was sworn into office on February 4, 2015. A Republican, he was subsequently elected to the office in the November 2016 general election.

Sias was the unsuccessful Republican nominee for lieutenant governor and running mate of Walker Stapleton in the 2018 Colorado gubernatorial election.

== Education ==
Lang holds a J.D. from the University of Michigan Law School, a Master of Science from the London School of Economics, and a Bachelor of Arts from Vassar College. He has practiced law in the past.

== Military service ==
Sias served in the United States Navy as a fighter pilot and Topgun instructor. He achieved the rank of Commander. He later served in the Air National Guard.

== Personal ==
Sias lives in Arvada, Colorado with his wife and three children. He works as a 777 pilot for FedEx.

== 2022 state treasurer campaign ==
In November 2021, Sias announced his candidacy for Colorado State Treasurer. On November 8, 2022, he lost to incumbent Democrat Dave Young in the 2022 general election.
