= 2022 Colorado Proposition 126 =

Proposition 126
- Alcohol Delivery Service Initiative

Results
Choice	Votes	%
Yes	1,183,059	48.86%
No	1,238,074	51.14%
Valid votes	2,421,133	95.30%
Invalid or blank votes	119,533	4.70%
Total votes	2,540,666	100.00%
Registered voters/turnout	3,833,468	66.28%

For
80–90%
70–80%
60–70%
50–60%
Against
90–100%
80–90%
70–80%
60–70%
50–60%
Other
Tie
No data

Proposition 126 (also known as the Alcohol Delivery Service Initiative) was a citizen-initiated, statewide ballot measure that was rejected in Colorado on November 8, 2022. The measure would have allowed alcohol retailers and liquor licensed businesses to offer alcohol delivery through third-party delivery services.

== Contents ==
The amendment appeared on the ballot as follows:

Shall there be a change to the Colorado Revised Statutes concerning authorization for the third-party delivery of alcohol beverages, and, in connection therewith, allowing retail establishments licensed to sell alcohol beverages for on-site or off-site consumption to deliver all types of alcohol beverages to a person twenty-one years of age or older through a third-party delivery service that obtains a delivery service permit; prohibiting the delivery of alcohol beverages to a person who is under 21 years of age, is intoxicated, or fails to provide proof of identification; removing the limit on the percentage of gross sales revenues a licensee may receive from alcohol beverage deliveries; and allowing a technology services company, without obtaining a third-party delivery service permit, to provide software or a digital network application that connects consumers and licensed retailers for the delivery of alcohol beverages?

== Overview ==
Proposition 126 would have:

- authorized grocery stores, convenience stores, liquor stores, bars, and restaurants to sell and deliver alcohol through third-party services, such as grocery and meal delivery companies, effective March 1, 2023
- removed restrictions limiting the amount of revenue a store can make through alcohol delivery
- permanently allowed bars and restaurants to offer alcohol takeout and delivery (temporarily authorized in 2020, set to automatically repeal on July 1, 2025)

== Background ==
Alcohol delivery has been allowed by liquor stores since 1994, by wineries since 1997, and by grocery and convenience stores since 2019. Currently, retailers are allowed to deliver alcohol using a store-owned vehicle by a store employee who is at least 21 years old.

== Support ==
Proposition 126 is supported by the Colorado Chamber of Commerce, the Colorado Restaurant Association, the Hispanic Restaurant Association, The Denver Post, the NAACP Rocky Mountain State Area Conference, the Aurora Chamber of Commerce, the Grand Junction Chamber of Commerce, the Wine in Grocery Stores Initiative, and Fair Delivery for All Small Businesses.

== Opposition ==
Proposition 126 is opposed by the Colorado Licensed Beverage Association and Keeping Colorado Local.
