= Barbara Kirkmeyer =

American politician

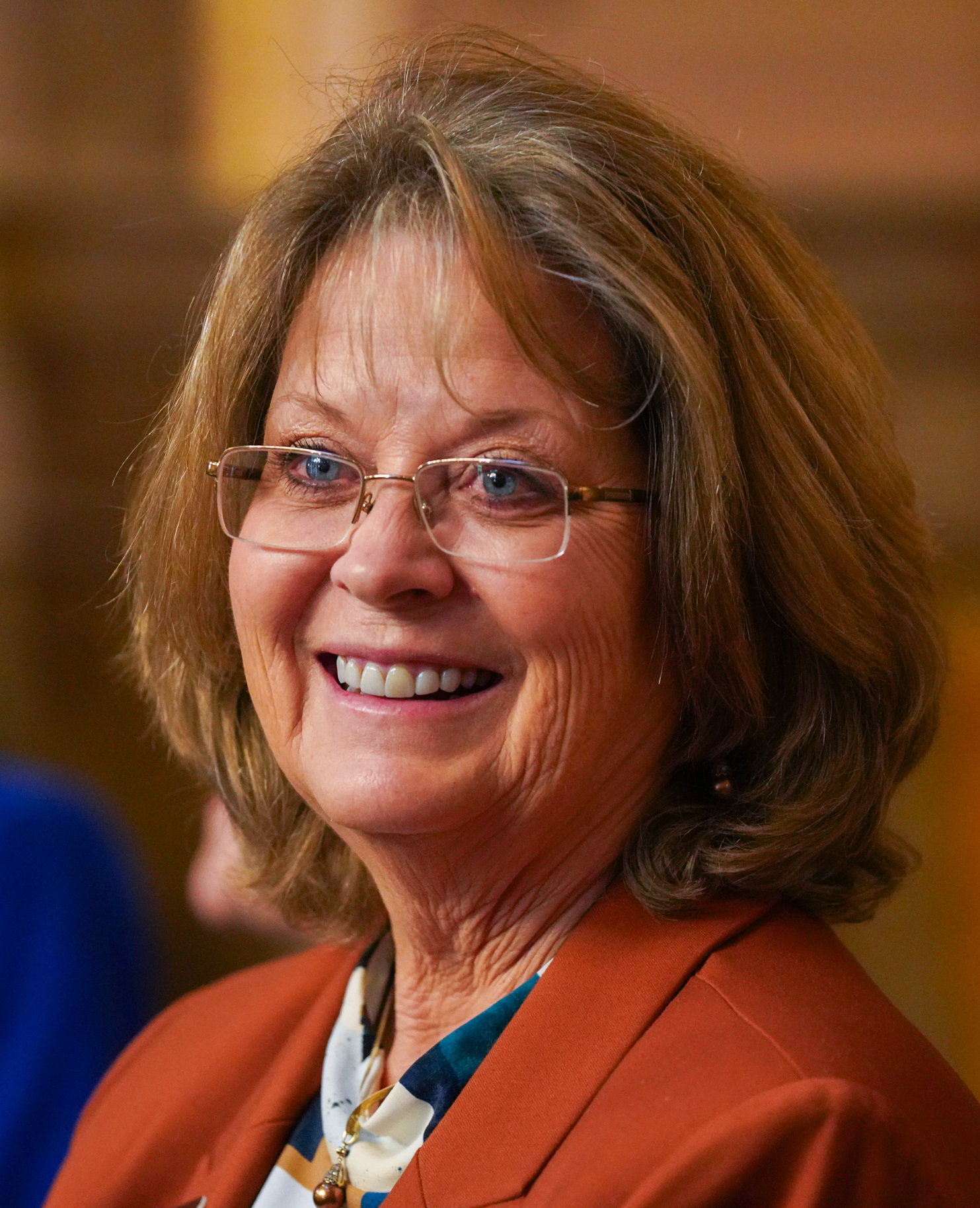
- Kirkmeyer in 2023

Member of the Colorado Senate from the 23rd district
- Incumbent
- Assumed office January 13, 2021
- Preceded by: Vicki Marble

Personal details
- Born: September 15, 1958 (age 67) Colorado
- Party: Republican
- Spouse: Charles
- Children: 2
- Education: University of Colorado, Boulder (BS)
- Website: Campaign website

Barbara Jean Kirkmeyer (born September 15, 1958) is an American politician serving as a member of the Colorado Senate for District 23, which encompasses parts of Weld and Larimer counties in north-central Colorado. A member of the Republican Party, she was a candidate in the 2026 Colorado gubernatorial election.

Kirkmeyer was the Republican nominee for Colorado's 8th congressional district in the 2022 election, losing to Yadira Caraveo in a close race. Kirkmeyer declined to run for the same seat in 2024, instead running for re-election.

== Early life and education ==
Kirkmeyer has lived in Weld County for 40 years. She earned a Bachelor of Science degree in physical education from the University of Colorado Boulder in 1980.

== Career ==
Kirkmeyer served for a total of 19 years as Weld County Commissioner, having been elected and re-elected five times. Representing the third district, she served from 1993 to 2000 and again from 2009 to 2020. In the interim, Kirkmeyer served as acting director of the Colorado Department of Local Affairs under Colorado Governor Bill Owens. In addition, she has served on several boards and commissions, including the Fort Lupton Urban Renewal Authority Board and the Dacono Urban Renewal Authority Board.

As Weld County commissioner in 2013, Kirkmeyer helped lead the 51st State Initiative in which several counties voted on whether to formally secede from the state of Colorado. Although the ballot measure failed, Kirkmeyer deemed the secession push a 'success.'

In the 2020 Republican primary election for Colorado's 23rd Senate district, Kirkmeyer defeated opponent Rupert Parchment, winning 55.24% of the votes cast. In the 2020 general election, Kirkmeyer defeated her Democratic Party opponent, winning 55.14% of the votes cast. She currently serves on the Senate Education, Local Government, Health and Human Services, and Statutory Revision Committees. She is also Vice Chair of the Legislative Interim Committee on School Finance.

=== 2022 congressional campaign ===
On November 15, 2021, Kirkmeyer announced she was running to represent Colorado's new 8th congressional district. Her decision prompted Weld County Commissioner Scott James to enter the Republican primary. As a state Senator, Kirkmeyer sponsored 49 passed bills and proposed unsuccessful primary election reforms. She has disagreed with state Republican leadership on some budget votes and LGBTQ+ issues.

During Kirkmeyer's campaign, she notably removed her stances on abortion from her website. She is one of Colorado's most anti-abortion lawmakers, supporting banning the procedure and some forms of contraception and celebrating the overturning of Roe v. Wade. She did not have to give up her state senate seat to run for Congress; Colorado state senators serve staggered four-year terms, and Kirkmeyer was not up for reelection until 2024.

On June 28, 2022, she won the Republican primary and advanced to the November general election, ultimately losing to Democratic state Representative Yadira Caraveo by 1,632 votes out of 236,501 cast.

In 2024, Kirkmeyer declined to run for Colorado's 8th congressional district, choosing instead to seek reelection to the state Senate.
