= Consulate General of the United States, Naples =

American diplomatic mission in Naples, Italy

Consulate General of the United States, Naples

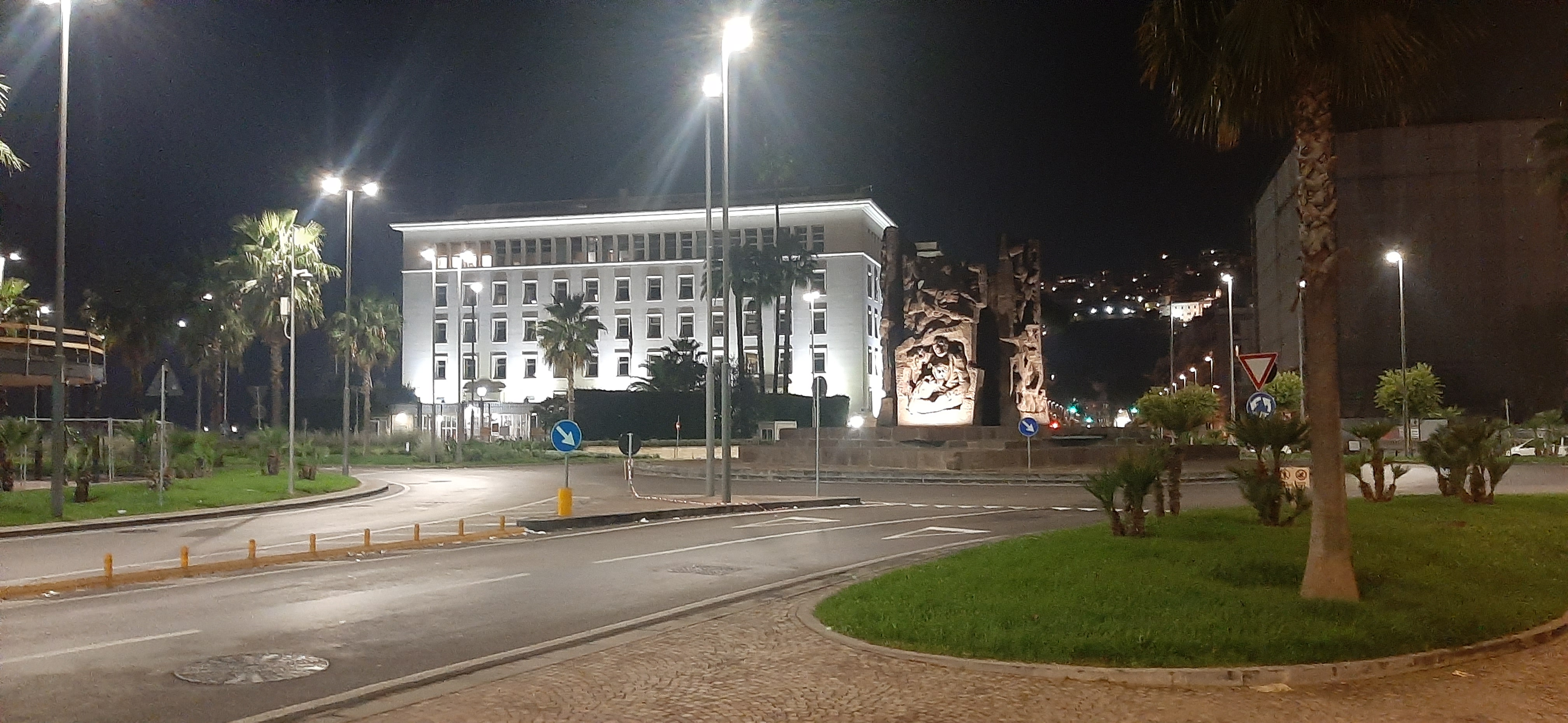
- Consulate General of the United States, Piazza della Repubblica
- Address: Piazza della Repubblica, 2, Naples, Italy
- Consul General: Terrence Flynn

The Consulate General of the United States, Naples is part of the diplomatic mission of the United States in Italy and represents the interests of the U.S. government in Naples and in the regions of Campania, Molise, Apulia, Basilicata, Calabria and Sicily. The Consulate General also oversees the Consular Agency in Palermo.

The Naples consulate is the only post in Italy authorized to issue immigrant visas, and has jurisdiction over applications from residents of Italy, Iran and Malta.

Terrence Flynn assumed the post of Consul General of the United States in Naples in July 2025.

== History ==
The consulate was founded on December 16, 1796, during the Kingdom of Naples. John S. M. Matthiew was the first consul assigned to Naples. Later, during the Kingdom of the Two Sicilies, the post was headed by diplomats including William Pinkney, John Nelson and Robert Dale Owen. Pinkney was assigned on April 23, 1816, to negotiate a treaty for the payment of reparations to American merchants for ships and goods seized or confiscated under the government of Joachim Murat between 1809 and 1813. Pinkney's mission was unsuccessful. Formal diplomatic relations began on January 25, 1832, when John Nelson presented his credentials to King Ferdinand II. Under Nelson, the Claims Convention was signed in Naples on October 14, 1832, settling the question of compensation for American merchants whose property had been seized during the Napoleonic Wars. In 1845, the Treaty of Commerce and Navigation was signed.

From 1897 to 1907, Aaron Homer Byington served as U.S. consul in Naples.

In 1917, as World War I continued, American sailors were treated and assisted at the consulate.

During World War II, following Italy's declaration of war on the United States in December 1941, the consulate was closed and resumed operations in July 1944 with the appointment of George Louis Brandt.

From 1954 into the 1990s, a branch of the United States Information Agency operated at the consulate.

From late 2007 to 2009, the consulate carried out a detailed review of several topics, publishing six reports. Historians Alessandro Giacone and Mimmo Franzinelli describe this material in their work as documentation of considerable value from several perspectives.

By 2023, the consulate had marked 227 years of activity, making it the oldest U.S. consulate still active in Italy and the seventh diplomatic post opened by the United States anywhere in the world.

The current building was completed in 1953, designed jointly by architects George Howe and Mario De Renzi.

== Bibliography ==
- Howard Rosario Marraro, Diplomatic Relations Between the United States and the Kingdom of the Two Sicilies. Volume I: 1816-1850, New York: S.F. Vanni (Ragusa), 1951.
- Daniel Spikes, Stati Uniti a Napoli: rapporti consolari, 1796-1996, Filema, 1996, ISBN 9788886358170.
- Elena Manzo, "Architettura degli Americani a Napoli: la banca d'America e il Consolato," in Meridione, year XI, no. 4 (2011), pp. 145-155.

== See also ==
- Embassy of the United States, Rome
- Italy–United States relations
- Diplomatic missions of the United States
