= 2022 Colorado Proposition 125 =

Referendum to allow stores that sell beer to also sell wine

Proposition 125
- Wine Sales in Grocery and Convenience Stores Initiative

Results
| Choice | Votes | % |
|---|---|---|
| Yes | 1,228,404 | 50.58% |
| No | 1,200,219 | 49.42% |
| Valid votes | 2,428,623 | 95.59% |
| Invalid or blank votes | 112,043 | 4.41% |
| Total votes | 2,540,666 | 100.00% |
| Registered voters/turnout | 3,833,468 | 66.28% |

For
80–90%
70–80%
60–70%
50–60%
Against
70–80%
60–70%
50–60%
Other
Tie
No data

Proposition 125 (also known as the Wine Sales in Grocery and Convenience Stores Initiative) was a citizen-initiated, statewide ballot measure that was approved in Colorado on November 8, 2022. The measure allowed for grocery and convenience stores that sell beer to also sell wine.

== Overview ==
Proposition 125 entailed:

- the creation of a new fermented malt beverage and wine retailer license
- the automatic conversion of old fermented malt beverage (FMB) licenses to the new fermented malt beverage and wine license, effective March 1, 2023
- allowing grocery stores, convenience stores, and other businesses that are licensed to sell beer to also sell wine
- allowing the same stores to offer tastings, if approved by the local licensing authority

Additionally, a new license could not be issued to a location within 500 feet of an existing retail liquor store and a new retail liquor store license could not be issued to a location within 500 feet of an existing licensed fermented malt beverage and wine retailer.

== Background ==
Under Colorado law at the time, the vast majority of grocery stores were only licensed to sell alcohol in the form of beer and other fermented malt beverages (hard seltzer, hard lemonade, etc.), while retail liquor stores were licensed to sell every type of alcohol.

== Support ==
Proposition 125 was supported by the Colorado Chamber of Commerce, The Denver Post, the Rocky Mountain State Conference of the NAACP, and the Wine in Grocery Stores Initiative.

== Opposition ==
Proposition 125 was opposed by the Colorado Licensed Beverage Association and the Keeping Colorado Local Campaign.
