= Dave Young (Colorado politician) =

American politician

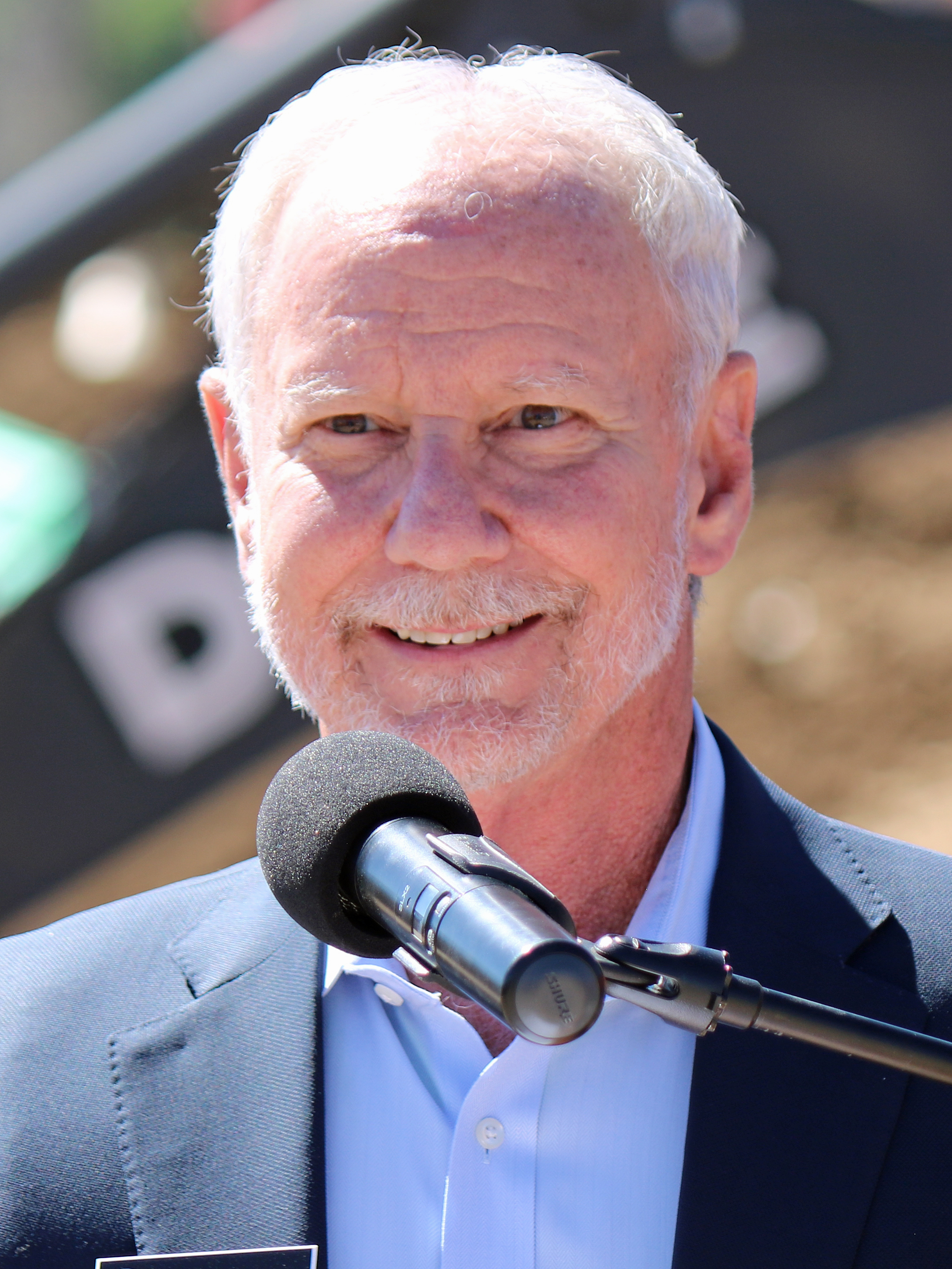
- Young in 2022

57th Treasurer of Colorado
- Incumbent
- Assumed office January 8, 2019
- Governor: Jared Polis
- Preceded by: Walker Stapleton

Member of the Colorado House of Representatives from the 50th district
- In office July 28, 2011 – January 4, 2019
- Preceded by: Jim Riesberg
- Succeeded by: Rochelle Galindo

Personal details
- Born: c. 1955 (age c. 70)
- Party: Democratic
- Spouse: Mary Young
- Education: Colorado State University (BS); University of Colorado Denver (MA)

David L. Young (born c. 1955) is an American politician and the current Treasurer of Colorado. He served as a Democratic member of the Colorado House of Representatives, representing District 50 from the time of his appointment on July 28, 2011, to fill the vacancy caused by the resignation of Jim Riesberg until his term ended and he took office as State Treasurer in early 2019. He won a second term as state treasurer in 2022.

== Early life and education ==
Young earned his BS in mathematics from Colorado State University and his MA from the University of Colorado. Young was a math and technology teacher at Heath Junior High in Greeley from 1975 to 1999. He also worked as a senior instructor at the University of Colorado, Denver.

== Political career ==
=== Colorado House of Representatives (2011-2019) ===
Young was appointed to the Colorado House of Representatives in 2011 and was elected to a full term in 2012. He represented the 50th district, encompassing Greeley, Evans, and Garden City. He was reelected in 2014 and 2016.

After the 2013 September floods, Young was appointed co-chairman of the Flood Disaster Study Committee.

In November 2014, Young was appointed by Speaker Dickey Hullinghorst as a member of the Joint Budget Committee (JBC) and was named as chair of the House Appropriations Committee. He served in those positions until November 2018.

=== Colorado State Treasurer (2019-present) ===
Young ran for Colorado State Treasurer in the 2018 election. He won the Democratic primary versus first-time candidate Bernard Douthit, who ran as a progressive candidate. In the November 6, 2018 general election, Young defeated Republican nominee Brian Watson.

On January 8, 2019, Young was sworn in as Colorado State Treasurer. In June 2019, Young's wife, Mary Young, was appointed by a vacancy committee to serve in his former state house seat following the resignation of his successor, Rochelle Galindo. In the 2022 Colorado State Treasurer election, Young won a second term as state treasurer, defeating Republican nominee Lang Sias.

== Electoral history ==
2012: Young was unopposed for the June 26, 2012 Democratic Primary, winning with 1,494 votes; and won the November 6, 2012 General election with 14,937 votes (60.0%) against Republican nominee Skip Carlson.

=== 2018 ===
2018 Colorado State Treasurer election Democratic Primary
| Party | Candidate | Votes | % |
|---|---|---|---|
| Democratic | Dave Young | 359,391 | 67.523% |
| Democratic | Bernard Douthit | 172,855 | 32.477% |
| Total votes | | 532,246 | 100% |

2018 Colorado State Treasurer election
| Party | Candidate | Votes | % |
|---|---|---|---|
| Democratic | Dave Young | 1,292,281 | 52.226% |
| Republican | Brian Watson | 1,111,641 | 44.926% |
| Constitution | Gerald Kilpatrick | 70,475 | 2.848% |
| Total votes | | 2,474,397 | 100% |

=== 2022 ===
2022 Colorado State Treasurer election Democratic Primary
| Party | Candidate | Votes | % |
|---|---|---|---|
| Democratic | Dave Young | 499,229 | 100% |
| Total votes | | 499,229 | 100% |

2022 Colorado State Treasurer election
| Party | Candidate | Votes | % |
|---|---|---|---|
| Democratic | Dave Young | 1,312,705 | 53.672% |
| Republican | Lang Sias | 1,052,337 | 43.026% |
| Libertarian | Anthony Delgado | 80,770 | 3.302% |
| Total votes | | 2,445,812 | 100% |

Political offices
| Preceded by Walker Stapleton | Treasurer of Colorado; 8 January 2019 – present | Incumbent |
