= Rochelle Galindo =

American politician from Colorado

Member of the Colorado House of Representatives from the 50th district
- In office January 4, 2019 – May 12, 2019
- Preceded by: Dave Young
- Succeeded by: Mary Young

Personal details
- Party: Democratic

Rochelle Galindo is an American politician who was elected to the Colorado House of Representatives in the 2018 Colorado House of Representatives election at the age of 28. She represented the 50th House District as a member of the Democratic Party.

She is a lesbian and was one of the few members of the LGBT community serving in the House.

== Resignation ==
Galindo resigned her State House seat on May 12, 2019 following sexual assault allegations made against her. Ultimately, she was ticketed for supplying alcohol to one of her campaign workers who was under 21. The police declined to press charges for the sexual assault allegations. Also, at a trial held in April 2021, a jury unanimously acquitted Galindo of the supplying alcohol to a minor charge.

== Recall effort ==
Following Galindo's yes vote on Colorado Senate Bill 19-181, a bill that would limit oil and gas production in the state, a committee was organized to recall her. She represented a district that lies in Weld County, one of the state's major petroleum and natural gas producing regions.
