= Glenn Vaad =

American politician

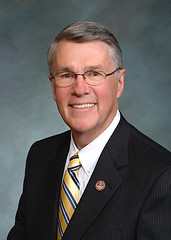

Member of the Colorado House of Representatives from the 48th district
- In office January 10, 2007 – January 9, 2013
- Preceded by: Dale Hall
- Succeeded by: Stephen Humphrey

Personal details
- Born: c. 1941
- Party: Republican
- Spouse: Mollie
- Profession: transportation engineer

Glenn Vaad (born c. 1941) is a former legislator in the U.S. state of Colorado. First elected to the Colorado House of Representatives as a Republican in 2006, Vaad represented House District 48, which encompasses western Greeley and southwestern Weld County, Colorado.

== Early career ==
Vaad earned a bachelor's degree in industrial construction management from Colorado State University. He spent most of his professional career within the Colorado Department of Transportation in many roles, including highway engineer, a management consultant, auditor, and legislative liaison. During his time at CDOT, Vaad spent 10 years working on the extension of Interstate 70 near Vail, Colorado. He retired in 1998, after 31 years with the department. He also served as Secretary of the Colorado Transportation Commission.

A volunteer fire fighter and emergency medical technician, Vaad has been elected to the Mead, Colorado Board of Trustees, of the Saint Vrain Valley School District Board of Education, (where he served for nine years, including a stint as board chair.), the Weld County Board of Commissioners, and served on the Weld County Planning Commission, the Mead Sanitation Board, the State Child Welfare Allocation Committee, and was a charter member of the Skyline High School Education Foundation.

On the Weld County Commission, Vaad represented District 2, which covered the rapidly growing southwestern portion of the county, including the communities of Dacono, Frederick, Firestone and Mead. First elected in 1998, Vaad, who rose to chair the board of commissioners, faced no opposition in his 2002 run for re-election. As a Weld County Commissioner, Vaad was noted for pressing for a regional airport in rapidly growing northern Colorado, and for a northern Colorado regional Council of Governments. Vaad also served on the North Front Range Transportation and Air Quality Planning Council, a regional group that proposed a Northern Colorado regional transportation authority, another of his regional priorities. Vaad also pushed, unsuccessfully, for the creation of a business incubator in Weld County.

Vaad is married and has lived in Mead for three decades; he and his wife, Mollie, have two children, Joel and Nicole, and three grandchildren. He has been an elder at LifeBridge Christian Church near Longmont, Colorado.

== Legislative career ==
=== 2006 election ===
In June 2005, Vaad, term-limited as a county commissioner, announced his intention to run for House District 48, a seat being vacated by term-limited Rep. Dale Hall, who ran for the state senate. Vaad faced Democrat Michael Dugan in the 2006 race to in a race where regional growth and transportation funding were key issues. Vaad won the November 2006 general election with about 58 percent of the vote.

=== 2007 legislative session ===
After his election, Vaad named transportation, public safety, and economic security his top legislative goals. Because of his experience with transportation issues, Vaad was named the ranking Republican member of the House Transportation Committee and co-chair of the General Assembly's Transportation Caucus in his first term. Vaad also sat on the House Appropriations Committee. Vaad sponsored only two bills during the 2007 session, both of them concerning disclosure of confidential information (insurance records and employee salaries) by government entities.

During the session, Vaad crossed party lines to support a controversial tax freeze proposed by Democrats to expand education funding.

Following the 2007 session, Vaad was appointed by Gov. Bill Ritter to a 30-member committee studying transportation funding options, the Blue Ribbon Panel on Transportation Finance and Implementation. and also served on the interim Transportation Legislation Review Committee.

=== 2008 legislative session ===
In the 2008 session of the Colorado General Assembly, Vaad sat on the House Appropriations Committee and the House Transportation and Energy Committee.

In the 2008 legislative session, Vaad planned, as part of a package of transportation legislation proposed by Republicans, to introduce a bill to turn over responsibility for state highways within city limits to each municipality, and to give cities a greater share of state transportation funds. The bill died in committee, as did legislation to allow citizens to form a regional transportation authority by petition. Vaad planned on continuing to advance his transportation agenda within the Transportation Legislation Review Committee, which met between legislative sessions. In particular, he planned on reintroducing a version of his transportation funding bill in the 2009 session.

Vaad also sponsored bills, signed into law, that required that old license plates be destroyed to prevent fake plates from being installed on vehicles, and to specify the location of registration stickers on license plates. Another bill to be introduced by Vaad would prohibit money from Colorado's College Opportunity Fund for being used for remedial university coursework.

=== 2008 election ===
Vaad announced his intention to run for a second term in January 2008 and was nominated by acclamation at the Republican assembly in February, although he faced a primary election challenge from Mark Charles Yingling, who petitioned onto the primary ballot.

Yingling ran a campaign positioning himself as more conservative than Vaad on issues including abortion, immigration, and taxes; Vaad, however, accused Yingling's campaign of distorting his legislative record. Yingling's campaign against Vaad also drew support from groups opposing gun control and illegal immigration.

Vaad narrowly won the Republican primary, prevailing with 53 percent of the vote, less than 500 votes more than Yingling—an unexpectedly strong result for a challenger who entered the contest relatively late and who did not even set up a web site. Vaad will face Democrat Bill Williams in November's general election. Vaad's re-election bid was endorsed by the Greeley Tribune, the Denver Post, and the Longmont Times-Call, and the Windsor Beacon. He won re-election, defeating Williams with about 60 percent of the popular vote.

=== 2009 legislative session ===
For the 2009 legislative session, Vaad was named to seats on the House Appropriations Committee and the House Transportation and Energy Committee, where he was the ranking Republican. Vaad sponsored legislation to transfer control of some transportation projects to local communities, and to allow Berthoud, Colorado to be added to the taxing district area for Aims Community College, pending voter approval.

In January 2009, while at the state capitol, Vaad injured his hamstring and subsequently fainted, requiring him to be transported out of the capitol on a stretcher; he had no serious injuries.

=== 2010 legislative session ===
In October 2009, after learning that the Colorado Department of Corrections planned on leaving a newly constructed maximum security prison in Cañon City unused due to state budget cuts, Vaad proposed selling the facility to a private prison operator, and planned on offering legislation during the 2010 session to accomplish this.

Vaad also planned on sponsoring legislation in 2010 to establish a "priority-based budgeting system" for the state of Colorado, and also legislation to have a private firm perform a "contingency recovery" audit of state spending, in which a fraction of the savings found by the audit would be awarded to the company performing it.

=== 2010 election ===
In October 2009, Vaad announced his intention to seek a third term as a state representative in the November 2010 legislative elections; he identified his "priority-based budgeting" proposal as a centerpiece of his campaign.

=== 2012 election ===
Vaad ran in the 2012 Republican primary election for Colorado State Senate District 23. He was defeated by Vicki Marble in the Republican primary on June 26, 2012. Vaad is succeeded by Republican Stephen Humphrey. Then in December 2013, Governor Hickenlooper appointed Vaad to the Colorado Public Utilities Commission. He began his three-year term there in January 2014.
