= Vicki Marble =

American politician (born 1952)

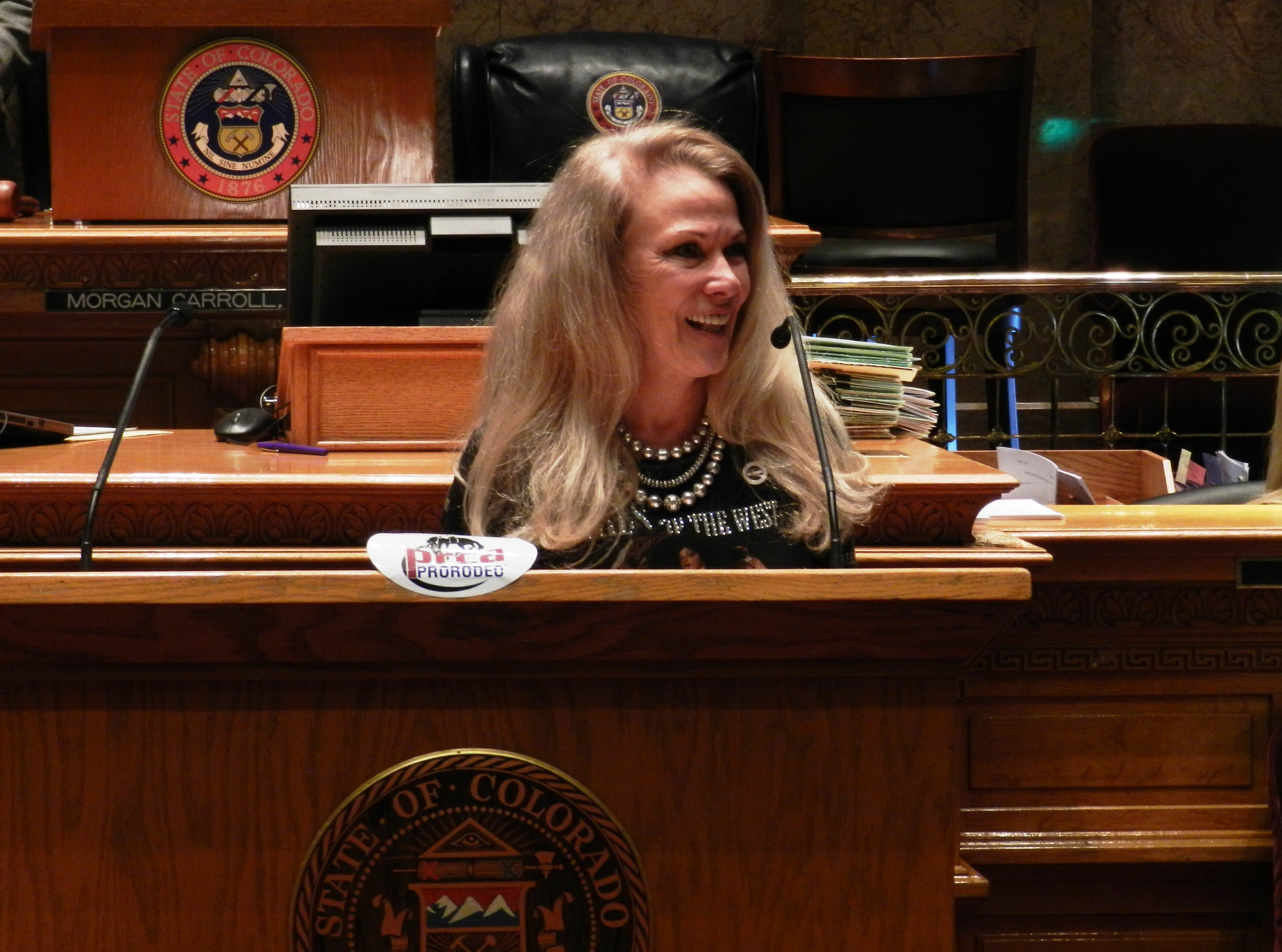

Member of the Colorado Senate from the 23rd district
- In office January 9, 2013 – January 13, 2021
- Preceded by: Shawn Mitchell
- Succeeded by: Barbara Kirkmeyer

Personal details
- Born: 1952 (age 73–74) Billings, Montana
- Party: Republican

Vicki Marble (born 1952) is an American politician who served in the Colorado Senate from the 23rd district as a member of the Republican Party.

== Early life ==
Vicki Marble was born to Fred Marble Jr. and Catharine Mary Connaghan, in Billings, Montana, in 1952. She worked as a bail bonder.

== State legislature ==
=== Elections ===
During the 2012 election Marble announced her campaign for the Republican nomination for a seat in the Colorado House of Representatives from the 49th district. She later sought the Republican nomination for a seat in the Colorado Senate from the 23rd district to succeed term-limited Senator Shawn Mitchell. She defeated Glenn Vaad for the Republican nomination and Democratic nominee Lee Kemp in the general election. She defeated Democratic nominee T.J. Cole in the 2016 election. During the 2020 election she ran for a seat in the state house from the 49th district, but lost to Mike Lynch in the Republican primary.

=== Tenure ===
During Marble's tenure in the state senate she served as vice-chair of the Education committee and chaired the Local Government and Veterans and Military Affairs committee. She was selected to serve as the chair of the Republican caucus in 2014. At one point she was the only woman in the Republican's senate caucus. She supported Donald Trump during the 2016 presidential election and reaffirmed her support after the release of the Access Hollywood tape.

Marble made comments about black people eating fried chicken during a meeting of the Economic Opportunity Poverty Reduction Task Force on August 21, 2013. In 2018, a $2,242 fine was issued against her by the Independent Ethics Commission due to her moderating a forum on oil and gas that was funded by those agencies.

== Political positions ==
Marble opposed legislation to recognize same-sex civil unions. She introduced legislation in 2015 to allow anybody with a gun to conceal carry. She and Tim Neville introduced legislation to punish sanctuary cities in Colorado. She is a climate change denier and stated that solar flares impact the climate more than vehicle emissions. She supported the secession of counties from Colorado in response to proposed oil and gas regulations. She opposed legislation to replace Columbus Day with a holiday in honor of Frances Xavier Cabrini. She voted against Colorado joining the National Popular Vote Interstate Compact.

Marble received an A rating from Americans for Prosperity in 2017.

== Electoral history ==
2012 Colorado Senate 23rd district Republican primary
Party	Candidate	Votes	%	±%
Republican	Vicki Marble	5,500	58.01%	
Republican	Glenn Vaad	3,981	41.99%	
Total votes		9,481	100.00%	

2012 Colorado Senate 23rd district election
Party	Candidate	Votes	%	±%
Republican	Vicki Marble	43,949	56.20%	
Democratic	Lee Kemp	34,252	43.80%	
Total votes		78,201	100.00%	

2016 Colorado Senate 23rd district Republican primary
Party	Candidate	Votes	%	±%
Republican	Vicki Marble (incumbent)	10,302	100.00%	
Total votes		9,481	100.00%	

2016 Colorado Senate 23rd district election
Party	Candidate	Votes	%	±%
Republican	Vicki Marble (incumbent)	55,528	57.96%	
Democratic	T.J. Cole	40,281	42.04%	
Total votes		95,809	100.00%	

2020 Colorado House of Representatives 49th district Republican primary
Party	Candidate	Votes	%	±%
Republican	Mike Lynch	12,606	67.02%	
Republican	Vicki Marble	6,202	32.98%	
Total votes		18,808	100.00%	
