= Colorado State Board of Education =

State agency of Colorado, United States

The Colorado State Board of Education is a government body in the U.S. state of Colorado tasked with general supervision of public schools. The Constitution of Colorado was amended in 1948 to authorize an elected State Board of Education and the first elections took place in November 1950. The board is composed of members elected from districts corresponding to Colorado's congressional districts. During periods when Colorado is allocated an even number of congressional seats, an additional member is elected by statewide vote, thereby leading to an odd number of members and reducing the potential for tied votes. Following the 2020 census, there are eight districts and therefore nine members.

== Members ==
Elected in partisan elections, board members serve staggered six-year terms. Districts 5, 6, and the at large seat hold elections in years divisible by six, followed two years later by Districts 2, 4, and 8, and two years later by Districts 1, 3, and 7.

Colorado Board of Education members
| District | Name | Party | Residence | Start | Next Election |
|---|---|---|---|---|---|
| At large | Kathy Plomer | Democratic | Broomfield | January 10, 2023 | 2028 |
| 1st | Lisa Escárcega | Democratic | Denver | January 12, 2021 | 2026 |
| 2nd | Kathy Gebhardt | Democratic | Boulder | January 8, 2025 | 2030 |
| 3rd | Sherri Wright | Republican | Cortez | October 28, 2024 (appointed) | 2026 |
| 4th | Kristi Burton Brown | Republican | Kiowa | January 8, 2025 | 2030 |
| 5th | Steve Durham | Republican | Colorado Springs | December 3, 2014 (appointed) | 2028 (term limited) |
| 6th | Rebecca McClellan, chair | Democratic | Centennial | January 2017 | 2028 (term limited) |
| 7th | Karla Esser | Democratic | Lakewood | January 12, 2021 | 2026 |
| 8th | Yazmin Navarro, vice chair | Republican | Johnstown | January 8, 2025 | 2030 |

== See also ==
- List of Ig Nobel Prize winners
