= Steven J. Durham =

American politician

Steve Durham

Member of the Colorado State Board of Education from the 5th district
- Incumbent
- Assumed office December 3, 2014
- Preceded by: Paul Lundeen

Member of the Colorado Senate
- In office 1981–1983

Member of the Colorado House of Representatives
- In office 1975–1981

Personal details
- Born: Steven Jackson Durham; 1946 or 1947 (age 78–79)
- Party: Republican
- Education: University of Northern Colorado (BA)

Steven Jackson Durham (born 1946/1947) is an American education commissioner. A Republican, he has served as chairman of the State Board of Education for Colorado's 5th congressional district since 2014.

He graduated from University of Northern Colorado. He was elected to the Colorado House of Representatives as a Republican in 1974, being re-elected in 1976 and 1979. In 1980 he was elected to the Colorado Senate, and in 1981 appointed a Regional Administrator for the Environmental Protection Agency. He left the post in 1983.
