= 2020 Colorado Amendment 76 =

- November 3, 2020
- Shall there be an amendment to the Colorado constitution requiring that to be qualified to vote at any election an individual must be a United States citizen?

Results
Choice	Votes	%
Yes	1,985,239	62.90%
No	1,171,137	37.10%
Valid votes	3,156,376	95.77%
Invalid or blank votes	139,290	4.23%
Total votes	3,295,666	100.00%

Yes
50-60%
60-70%
70-80%
80-90%
90-100%
No
50–60%

Colorado Amendment 76, also known as the Citizenship Requirement for Voting Initiative, was an initiated state statute referendum that appeared on the ballot in the U.S. state of Colorado on November 3, 2020. The measure would prohibit non-citizens from voting in Colorado elections. As it added to the Constitution of Colorado, it required the support of at least 55% of voters to pass. It was approved by 63% of voters, more than the 55% threshold required for such amendments.

Prior to Amendment 76, the Constitution of Colorado had stated that all eligible U.S. citizens were allowed to vote in elections in Colorado, which already meant non-citizens were prohibited from voting. Amendment 76 also nullified the Colorado Votes Act, which allowed 17 year olds to vote in partisan primaries if they would be 18 by the time of the general election, by restricting voting to those 18 years old or older.

== Endorsements ==
Yes

Statewide officials

- Scott Gessler, former Secretary of State of Colorado (2011-2015)

State representatives

- Patrick Neville, Minority Leader of the Colorado House of Representatives (2017-present) and state representative from the 45th district (2015-present)

Newspapers and other media

- The Gazette (Colorado Springs)

Organizations

- Colorado Republican Party
No

State senators

- Steve Fenberg, Majority Leader of the Colorado Senate (2019-present) and state senator from the 18th district (2017-present)
- Mike Foote, state senator from the 17th district (2019-present) and state representative from the 12th district (2013-2019)
- Julie Gonzales, state senator from the 34th district (2019-present)
- Chris Hansen, state senator from the 31st district (2020-present) and state representative from the 6th district (2017-2020)
- Dominick Moreno, state senator from the 21st district (2017-present) and state representative from the 32nd district (2013-2017)

State representatives

- KC Becker, Speaker of the Colorado House of Representatives (2019-present), former Majority Leader (2017-2019), and state representative from the 13th district (2013-present)
- Adrienne Benavidez, state representative from the 32nd district (2017-present)
- Yadira Caraveo, state representative from the 31st district (2019-present)
- James Coleman, state representative from the 7th district (2017-present)
- Monica Duran, state representative from the 24th district (2019-present)
- Daneya Esgar, state representative from the 46th district (2015-present)
- Meg Froelich, state representative from the 3rd district (2019-present)
- Alec Garnett, Majority Leader of the Colorado House of Representatives (2019-present) and state representative from the 2nd district (2015-present)
- Serena Gonzales-Gutierrez, state representative from the 4th district (2019-present)
- Matt Gray, state representative from the 33rd district (2017-present)
- Leslie Herod, state representative from the 8th district (2017-present)
- Edie Hooton, state representative from the 10th district (2017-present)
- Dominique Jackson, state representative from the 42nd district (2017-present)
- Sonya Jaquez Lewis, state representative from the 12th district (2019-present)
- Chris Kennedy, state representative from the 23rd district (2017-present)
- Cathy Kipp, state representative from the 52nd district (2019-present)
- Susan Lontine, state representative from the 1st district (2015-present)
- Julie McCluskie, state representative from the 61st district (2019-present)
- Kyle Mullica, state representative from the 34th district (2019-present)
- Dylan Roberts, state representative from the 26th district (2017-present)
- Jonathan Singer, state representative from the 11th district (2012-present)
- Emily Sirota, state representative from the 9th district (2019-present)
- Marc Snyder, state representative from the 18th district (2019-present)
- Kerry Tipper, state representative from the 28th district (2019-present)
- Brianna Titone, state representative from the 27th district (2019-present)
- Mike Weissman, state representative from the 36th district (2017-present)
- Steven Woodrow, state representative from the 6th district (2020-present)

Newspapers and other media

- Boulder Weekly
- The Denver Post
- The Durango Herald
- Steamboat Pilot & Today

Organizations

- American Civil Liberties Union
- America Votes
- Colorado Working Families Party

== Results ==
2020 Colorado Amendment 76
Choice	Votes	%
For	1,985,239	62.90
Against	1,171,137	37.10
Total	3,156,376	100.00
Valid votes	3,156,736	95.77
Invalid/blank votes	139,290	4.23
Total votes	3,296,026	100.00
