= Senator Groff =

Senator Groff may refer to:

- Peter Groff (born 1963), Colorado State Senate
- Regis Groff (1935–2014), Colorado State Senate
