= Bill Thiebaut =

American politician

William Thiebaut, Jr.

District Attorney for Colorado's Tenth Judicial District
- In office January 11, 2005 – January 7, 2013
- Preceded by: Gus Sandstrom
- Succeeded by: Jeff Chostner

Majority Leader of the Colorado Senate
- In office January 10, 2001 – January 11, 2003

Member of the Colorado Senate from the 3rd district
- In office May 1993 – January 11, 2003
- Preceded by: Larry Trujillo
- Succeeded by: Abel Tapia

Member of the Colorado House of Representatives from the 45th district
- In office January 13, 1993 – May 1993
- Preceded by: John J. Irwin
- Succeeded by: Mildred Mattingly

Member of the Colorado House of Representatives from the 41st district
- In office January 14, 1987 – January 13, 1993
- Preceded by: Stanley E. Johnson
- Succeeded by: Peggy Kerns

Personal details
- Born: William Thiebaut, Jr. 1947 (age 78–79) Santa Fe, New Mexico, U.S.
- Party: Democratic
- Spouse: Mary Ann
- Children: 15
- Profession: Attorney

Bill Thiebaut is an American attorney and politician from Pueblo, Colorado. He was elected to four two-year terms in the Colorado House of Representatives, serving from 1987 to 1993, when he was appointed to the Colorado Senate to fill a vacancy following the resignation of Larry Trujillo. Following his appointment to the senate, he was elected and re-elected to the senate in 1994 and 1998. In the senate, he served as majority leader in the 2001-2002 session.

In 2002, Thiebaut was a candidate for lieutenant governor of Colorado, running with gubernatorial candidate Rollie Heath. In the general election, Bill Owens and Jane Norton defeated Heath and Thiebaut.

Following his service as a legislator, Thiebaut was elected district attorney of Colorado's Tenth Judicial District, which comprises Pueblo County, for two four-year terms, holding the office from January 2005 to January 2013.

In November 2023, Thiebaut, whose voter registration was recorded as independent, was elected to an at large seat on the Pueblo School District 60 school board, for a four-year term.

Prior to serving in elected office, Thiebaut served as the public trustee of Pueblo County from 1979 to 1986. After leaving the DA's office, Thiebaut has continued to serve on various committees, including the eleven-member State Transportation Commission, which he chaired.

== Personal life ==
Thiebaut was born in 1947 in Santa Fe, New Mexico, but when he was very young, his family moved to Pueblo, where he was raised. He attended high school in Cañon City, Colorado. He and his wife Mary Ann have 15 children.
