= Val Vigil =

American politician (1947–2021)

Member of the Colorado House of Representatives from the 32nd district
- In office January 13, 1999 – January 10, 2007
- Preceded by: Jeannie Reeser
- Succeeded by: Edward Casso

Personal details
- Born: July 9, 1947 Taos, New Mexico
- Died: February 5, 2021 (aged 73) Thornton, Colorado
- Party: Democratic

Val Vigil (July 9, 1947 – February 5, 2021) was an American politician who served in the Colorado House of Representatives from the 32nd district from 1999 to 2007.

He died of a stroke on February 5, 2021, in Thornton, Colorado at age 73.
