= John Beno =

American politician

- Beno during his time in the Colorado State Senate

Member of the Colorado Senate from the 3rd district
- In office January 12, 1983 – January 14, 1987
- Preceded by: Regis Groff
- Succeeded by: Larry Trujillo

Member of the Colorado Senate from the 26th district
- In office January 9, 1979 – January 12, 1983
- Preceded by: Ray Kogovsek
- Succeeded by: Martha Ezzard

Personal details
- Born: John Richardson Beno; November 13, 1931 Council Bluffs, Iowa, U.S.
- Died: December 5, 2000 (aged 69) Pueblo, Colorado
- Party: Democratic
- Education: Iowa State University, Loras College, Creighton University, Loyola University Chicago, Iliff School of Theology, the University of Denver, and St. Thomas Seminary
- Profession: Catholic priest, politician

John Beno (November 13, 1931 – December 5, 2000) was a Catholic priest and Democratic Party politician from Colorado, U.S. He served two terms in the Colorado Senate, totaling eight years, from January 1979 to January 1987. He was ordained a Catholic priest in 1959 and served as a priest in several southern Colorado communities, chiefly in Pueblo.

== Elections ==
Beno was first elected to the Colorado Senate in 1978. He was re-elected in 1982. He faced little opposition in the primary or general elections.

== Legislative leadership positions ==
Among the committees Beno served on in the Colorado Senate were the Appropriations Committee and the Joint Budget Committee.

== Sexual abuse allegations ==
A 2019 report by the Colorado Attorney General published after Beno's death implicated him in the sexual abuse of two children, one in 1961 and one in 1968 or 1969.

== Death ==
Beno died on December 5, 2000, in Pueblo.
