= Manny Rutinel =

American politician (born 1994)

- Official portrait, 2026

Member-elect of the U.S. House of Representatives from Colorado's 8th district
- Assuming office January 3, 2027
- Succeeding: Gabe Evans

Member of the Colorado House of Representatives from the 32nd district
- In office October 13, 2023 – September 4, 2026
- Preceded by: Dafna Michaelson Jenet
- Succeeded by: María González

Personal details
- Born: Tonty Enmanuel Rutinel; December 20, 1994 (age 31) Los Angeles, California, U.S.
- Party: Democratic
- Education: Pasco-Hernando State College (AA); University of Florida (BA, BS); Johns Hopkins University (MS); Yale University (JD)
- Website: Campaign website

Tonty Enmanuel Rutinel (born December 20, 1994) is an American attorney and politician who is the U.S. Representative-elect from Colorado's 8th congressional district. Previously, he served as a member of the Colorado House of Representatives for the 32nd district from 2023 to 2026.

Rutinel was the Democratic nominee for Colorado's 8th congressional district in the 2026 election, defeating incumbent Republican Gabe Evans in the general.

== Early life and education ==
Rutinel was born in Los Angeles, California, in 1994 and raised by a single mother in the Dominican Republic until he was six years old. (Note: His paternal family is an influential political dynasty in the Dominican Republic. His estranged father, Tonty Rutinel, is a politician and diplomat from the Dominican Republic who was Senator (2002–2006) and Representative (1990–2002 and 2020–2024), and currently serves as Consul-General to Bogotá, Colombia since 2024; he unsuccessfully ran for mayor of Santo Domingo Este in the 2010 and 2016 elections. His paternal grandmother, Francisca Otilia Domínguez (1923–2010), was a leader in the failed April Revolution of 1965 and later became Consul-General of the D.R. in Haiti and Panama; she was a cousin of President Hipólito Mejía. Abelardo Rutinel, a cousin of Manny, is a congressman of the D.R. since 2024. His uncle José Ulises Rutinel (1943–2017) was a legal consultant, criminologist, author, professor at the National University of Loja (Ecuador) and Dean of the Faculty of Philosophy of the Autonomous University of Santo Domingo (Dominican Republic).) They returned to the United States and lived in California and Florida. He attended schools in Florida. He stated that he worked at McDonald's while attending high school and regularly gave blood at a plasma center to help support his family.

Rutinel earned an associate degree from Pasco–Hernando State College, a Bachelor of Arts in economics and Bachelor of Science in microbiology from the University of Florida, a Master of Science in applied economics from Johns Hopkins University, and a Juris Doctor from Yale Law School.

== Early career ==
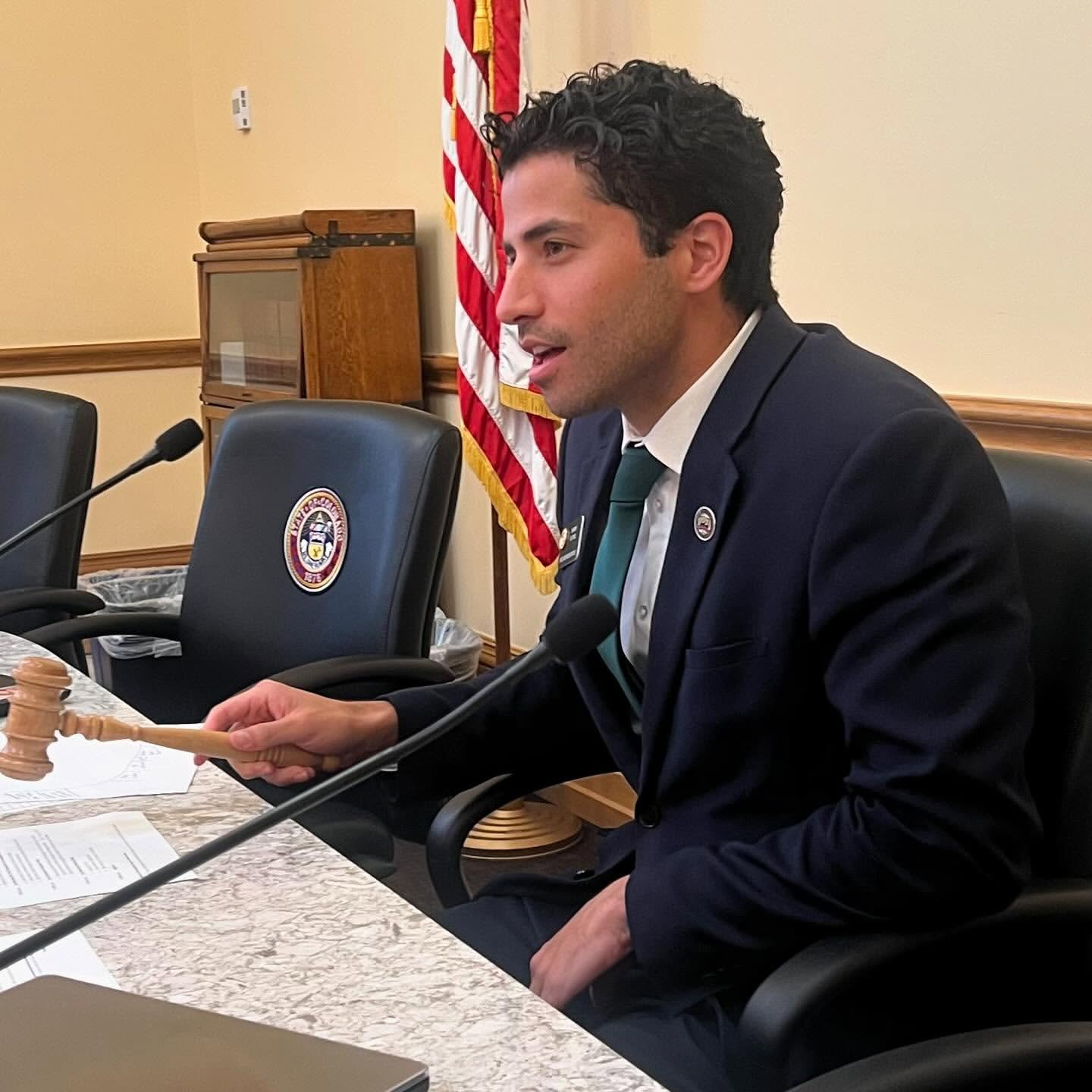
Rutinel in 2025

From 2016 to 2018, Rutinel served as an economist for the United States Army Corps of Engineers in Upstate New York. Rutinel served as a first responder in Puerto Rico after Hurricane Maria. After graduating from law school, he worked as an associate attorney at Earthjustice. Since 2021, Rutinel has worked as the CEO of Climate Refarm, a non-profit organization. Rutinel was introduced to Colorado politics working for Senator John Hickenlooper's campaign in 2020.

== Colorado House of Representatives (2023–2026) ==
=== Appointment ===
In October 2023, Rutinel was appointed by an Adams County Democratic vacancy committee to represent Colorado's 32nd House District and fill the former seat of Dafna Michaelson Jenet in the Colorado House of Representatives. Rutinel was picked above community activist Luz “Lucy” Molina by the committee with a 23-5 vote of the 34 person committee (29 were present at the vote). Michaelson Jenet was selected by a vacancy committee to represent District 21 in the Colorado State Senate. At the time of his appointment, Rutinel had already filed to run for the 2024 election in House District 32 since the incumbent was term limited.

=== Election ===
In 2024, Rutinel ran unopposed for the House District 32 seat and won election with 22,853 votes.

=== Tenure ===
In his first year in office, Rutinel was a prime sponsor of 18 bills. The bill topics range widely including support for living organ donors, supporting air pollution oversight, funding for youth mental health services, and ensuring qualified incarcerated Coloradans can access their right to vote. The number of bills sponsored by Rutinel fell to 6 in 2025. Rutinel's focus again varied widely on issues but included support for protecting animal test subjects from euthanasia, ensuring food truck safety, requiring the disclosure of greenhouse gases for large corporations, and creating a interagency council on homelessness in Colorado to reduce homelessness and support homeless individuals. In 2026, Rutinel was the prime sponsor for 6 bills in the Colorado House of Representatives. These bills include provisions for workplace safety, requiring local governments to plan for reducing homelessness, and requires local law enforcement to track and report all firearms taken in police action to federal authorities. In 2026, Rutinel led legislative efforts to conduct oversight of ICE detention centers in Colorado.

He announced in January 2025 that he would run for the 2026 U.S. House of Representatives election in Colorado's 8th congressional district, seeking to unseat Republican incumbent Gabe Evans. Rutinel resigned from his position as a Colorado state representative on September 4th, 2026 to focus on his run for Colorado's 8th Congressional District.

=== Committees ===
- Energy and Environment

== U.S. House of Representatives ==
=== Election ===
The race for Colorado's 8th Congressional District between Rutinel and Evans is the highest spending campaign in Colorado, as of October 2026, for the 2026 elections with about $11 million spent by outside organizations between the June 30 primary and October 2026. In the last month of the campaigns, it was recorded that this number reached almost $20 million, a total of $19,704,436 raised by campaign committees in the 2025-2026 election cycle for Colorado's 8th District.

=== Tenure ===
Rutinel will take office on January 3, 2027.

== Political positions ==
=== Social issues ===
Rutinel supports tax credits for working parents and higher taxes on billionaires. Rutinel supports protecting Social Security and Medicare. Rutinel supports removing the taxable income cap for contributions to social security to continue to fund the program.

=== Technology and AI ===
Rutinel supports the regulation of AI, whistleblower protections, and transparency rules for AI models. Rutinel cosponsored a 2024 bill in the Colorado legislature that attempted to regulate use of AI for corporate discrimination.

=== Agriculture ===
Rutinel has publicly raised questions about the production and consumption of meat and dairy products since his time as a student in Florida. In 2016, he posed shirtless on draped in a banner for the People for Ethical Treatment of Animals while a student in Florida. In a publication from Yale during his time as a law student, Rutinel is quoted as saying that "the globe must dramatically shift away from animal products and towards fruits, vegetables, legumes, whole grains, and nuts" while citing a study on climate change. Rutinel has made comments that his views on agriculture are nuanced and he opposes bad actors but not the industry as a whole. Rutinel opposes tariffs put in place by President Donald Trump due to the financial impact on farmers and ranchers.

=== Climate change ===
Rutinel was appointed to the Energy and Environment Committee in the Colorado House of Representatives for the 2024-2025 session. Rutinel supports climate action and supports federal tax credits for renewable energy. Rutinel formerly supported a ban on fracking but no longer supports this position.

=== Healthcare ===
Rutinel opposes high health care costs and supports negotiations to lower pharmaceutical costs. He also is in favor of protecting SNAP access. Rutinel supports a public health insurance option.

=== Immigration ===
Rutinel supports pathways to citizenship for people formerly covered under DACA. He also supports citizenship options for immigrants who came to the United States illegally if they have been in the country for many years and been paying taxes. Rutinel opposes the methods used by immigration enforcement in the United States.

=== Foreign policy ===
Rutinel supports U.S. financial support to Ukraine. He supports defending Israel as a US ally. Rutinel supports ending the war in Iran through a war powers resolution.

=== Congressional limitations ===
Rutinel supports term limits for all public offices. Rutinel also supports a ban on stock trading by members of Congress. Rutinel supports a ban on former members of Congress working as lobbyists.

== Electoral history ==
Year	Office	Party	Primary			General				Result	Swing	Ref.
Year	Office	Party	Total	%	P.	Total	%	±%	P.	Result	Swing	Ref.
2024	CO State House of Representatives	Democratic	N/A	N/A	N/A	22,853	100%	N/A	1st	Won	Hold	
2026	U.S. House of Representatives	Democratic	80,274	62.8%	1st	286,502	55.42%		1st	Won	Swing	

== Notes ==
U.S. House of Representatives
Preceded by Gabe Evans	Member of the U.S. House of Representatives from Colorado's 8th congressional district Taking office 2027	Elect
