= Steve Fenberg =

American politician

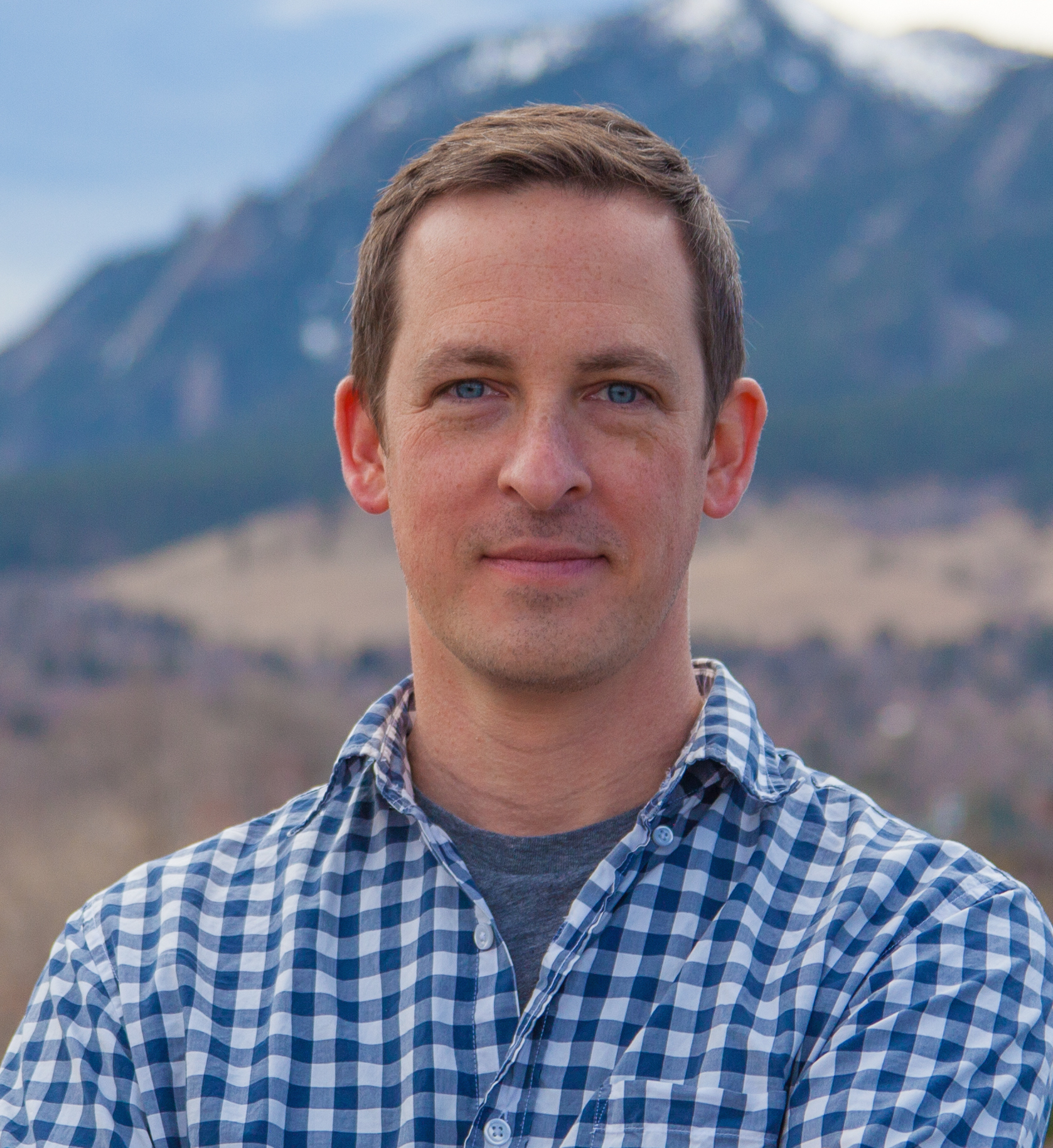

President of the Colorado Senate
- In office February 22, 2022 – January 8, 2025
- Preceded by: Leroy Garcia
- Succeeded by: James Coleman

Majority Leader of the Colorado Senate
- In office January 4, 2019 – February 22, 2022
- Preceded by: Chris Holbert
- Succeeded by: Dominick Moreno

Member of the Colorado Senate from the 18th district
- In office January 11, 2017 – January 8, 2025
- Preceded by: Rollie Heath
- Succeeded by: Judy Amabile

Personal details
- Born: Stephen Fenberg; January 2, 1984 (age 42) Toledo, Ohio, U.S.
- Party: Democratic
- Spouse: Lindsay Urban
- Education: University of Colorado, Boulder (BA)
- Website: Official website

Stephen Fenberg (born January 2, 1984) is an American politician who serves in the Colorado Senate from the 18th district, since 2017, as a member of the Democratic Party. He serves as President of the Senate and served as Majority Leader from 2019 to 2022.

Fenberg was born in Toledo, Ohio, and educated at the University of Colorado Boulder. During his time at college he founded New Era with Leslie Herod and Joe Neguse and registered 150,000 voters while serving as its director. He was elected to the Colorado Senate in the 2016 election and reelected in 2020. Fenberg was selected to become the Majority Leader in 2018. He was selected to replace Leroy Garcia as President of the Senate following Garcia's resignation.

== Early life ==
Stephen Fenberg was born in Toledo, Ohio, to Bill and Harriet Fenberg. His mother distributed party literature from the Ohio Democratic Party during the 1990s. He married Lindsay Urban, with whom he has two children, on June 26, 2017, in Lyons, Colorado, conducted by the Jewish spiritual leader of the Jewish congregation in Boulder. He graduated from University of Colorado Boulder with a bachelor's degree in environmental policy. He worked as the chief of staff for the student union while at college.

== Career ==
=== Politics ===
Fenberg founded New Era Colorado, an organization which attempts to register young voters, along with Leslie Herod and Joe Neguse while attending college in 2006, and served as its executive director during which the organization registered 150,000 voters. He discussed creating the organization with Lisa Kaufmann, who later became the chief of staff for Governor Jared Polis.

=== Colorado Senate ===
==== Elections ====
Senator Rollie Heath, a member of the Democratic Party from the 18th district, was term-limited during the 2016 campaign and Fenberg ran to succeed him. He won the Democratic nomination without opposition and defeated Republican nominee M. Peter Spraitz. He won reelection in the 2020 election against Republican nominee Peg Cage.

==== Tenure ====
In 2017, Fenberg was appointed to serve on the Agriculture, Natural Resources and Energy, State, Veterans, and Military Affairs, and Transportation committees. Fenberg defeated Rachel Zenzinger in the Democratic caucus for the position of Majority Leader on November 8, 2018. On February 9, 2022, he was selected by the Democratic caucus to replace Senator Leroy Garcia as president of the state senate, due to Garcia resigning from the state senate, and assume the office on February 22. Senator Dominick Moreno replaced Fenberg as Majority Leader.

Fenberg endorsed Representative Diana DeGette for reelection during the 2020 election. He endorsed Senator Michael Bennet for reelection to the United States Senate in the 2022 election.

== Political positions ==
Fenberg and Representatives Herod and Julie McCluskie introduced legislation in 2020, that requested $14 million to fund a program, which would serve around 5,300 people, to have Colorado repay student loan debts for the first two years following graduation. Fenberg was among thirty-seven legislators who endorsed a letter in 2018, calling for Planned Parenthood to allow for their workers to form a union. He and nine other Democratic members of the state senate received a 100% score from the AFL–CIO in 2018.

Fenberg received a 100% rating from Conservation Colorado in 2019. He was one of the signatories of a letter sent by Governor Jared Polis to President Joe Biden asking for immigration laws to be relaxed, stating that Colorado was ready to accept refuges following the end of the Afghanistan War. He received an A rating from NARAL Pro-Choice America.

In 2017, Fenberg voted against legislation in the Finance committee which would allow concealed carry without a permit. Following the 2021 Boulder shooting he stated that he supported an assault weapons ban and sponsored legislation to repeal a Colorado law which prohibited local governments from passing gun control stricter than state law.

In 2017, he sponsored legislation to lower the minimum age to serve in the Colorado General Assembly from 25 to 21. In 2019, he sponsored legislation that would allow paroled felons to vote and after its passage it allowed around 11,500 paroles to vote.

Fenberg and Representative Paul Rosenthal sponsored legislation in 2017, to prohibit conversion therapy on minors by licensed mental health professionals. He and Senator Dominick Moreno, and Representatives Dafna Michaelson Jenet and Daneya Esgar sponsored legislation in 2019, to prohibit conversion therapy.

== Electoral history ==
2016 Colorado Senate 18th district election
Primary election
Party	Candidate	Votes	%
Democratic	Steve Fenberg	12,433	100.00%
Total votes		12,433	100.00%
General election
Democratic	Steve Fenberg	67,799	79.61%
Republican	M. Peter Spraitz	17,370	20.39%
Total votes		85,169	100.00%

2020 Colorado Senate 18th district election
Primary election
Party	Candidate	Votes	%
Democratic	Steve Fenberg (incumbent)	40,036	100.00%
Total votes		40,036	100.00%
General election
Democratic	Steve Fenberg	75,261	82.90%
Republican	Peg Cage	15,524	17.10%
Total votes		90,785	100.00%

Colorado Senate
Preceded by Chris Holbert	Majority Leader of the Colorado Senate; 2019–2022	Succeeded by Dominick Moreno
Preceded by Leroy Garcia	President of the Colorado Senate; 2022–2025	Succeeded by James Coleman
