= Ron Tupa =

American teacher and politician (born 1966)

Member of the Colorado Senate from the 18th district
- In office January 2001 – January 7, 2009
- Preceded by: Dorothy Rupert
- Succeeded by: Rollie Heath

Member of the Colorado House of Representatives from the 14th district
- In office 1994 – January 2001
- Preceded by: Dorothy Rupert
- Succeeded by: Alice Madden

Personal details
- Born: August 25, 1966 (age 59) Harbor Beach, Michigan
- Party: Unity
- Other political affiliations: Democratic (until 2023)
- Occupation: Teacher, politician

Ron Tupa (born August 26, 1966) is an American politician. He is a former Democratic Colorado state legislator, where he served a total of 14 years in the CO General Assembly from 1994 to 2008 before leaving office in 2009 due to term limits. He was a member of the Colorado House of Representatives from 1995 through 2000 and a member of the Colorado Senate, representing the 18th District from 2001 to 2008.

== Biography ==
=== Early life and education ===
Tupa was born in Harbor Beach, Michigan in 1966. He comes from a long line of United States Coast Guardsmen (brother, father, uncle, grandfather, great-grandfather, great uncles) and his father's service gave him the great opportunity to live in many different states, including Michigan, Ohio, Mississippi and military bases in New York and Texas.

Opting not to enlist in the Coast Guard, Ron was instead the first of the Tupas to go on to college. After graduating from the University of Texas at Austin in 1989, he moved to Colorado in 1990. He worked full-time for a year to establish state residency then went back to school to receive a teaching certificate from the University of Colorado at Boulder in 1994.

=== Career ===
While attending the University of Colorado, Ron spent the next 3 years working nights and weekends as a Teamster loading freight onto trucks. His years as a union member instilled in him an understanding of the value of collective bargaining for ensuring a middle-class standard of living. Through the years he has been a member of 3 different unions, including his current membership in AFSCME local 821.

Sen. Tupa has taught high school social studies as a teacher or substitute teacher for the last 11 years, starting in 1995. In that time he has taught at Evergreen High School in Jefferson County, Boulder High School, and in Louisville at Monarch High School. He has also taught at many middle schools and other high schools throughout Boulder Valley School District as a substitute teacher.

In 1994, Ron was President of the Colorado Young Democrats when he was appointed to fill a vacancy for state representative in Boulder's House District 14. He was reelected in 1996 and again in 1998. In 2000, he was elected to the state senate and reelected in 2004 with over 70% of the vote. He was term-limited in 2008 after 14 years in public office.

== Personal life ==
Tupa married Kara Miller in the summer of 2001, then divorced in 2008. They have two children, son Miller (born 2005) and daughter, Austin (born 2006). Tupa resides in Boulder.
