= Senator Trujillo =

Senator Trujillo may refer to:

- Larry Trujillo (1940–2022), Colorado State Senate
- Linda Trujillo (born 1959), New Mexico State Senate
