= Reeser =

Reeser is a family name that can refer to:

- Autumn Reeser (born 1980), American actress
- Esther Ann Reeser (1928-2014), All-American Girls Professional Baseball League player
- Jeannie Reeser, American politician, member of the Colorado state legislature until 1998
- Mary Reeser (1884-1951), American suspected victim of spontaneous human combustion
- Morgan Reeser (born 1962), American Olympic Games medalist
- Sara Reeser (born 1925), All-American Girls Professional Baseball League player
- Nathan Reeser (born 1980), Professional Welder
