= María González (Colorado politician) =

American politician

Member of the Colorado House of Representatives from the 32nd district
- Incumbent
- Assumed office October 9, 2026
- Appointed by: Jared Polis
- Preceded by: Manny Rutinel
- Succeeded by: Chris VanDijk (elect)

Personal details
- Party: Democratic

María González is an American politician serving as a member of the Colorado House of Representatives from the 32nd district. She was appointed on October 9, 2026, by Governor Jared Polis, succeeding Manny Rutinel. She is the founder and CEO of Adelante Community Development.
