= Dorothy Rupert =

American teacher, counselor, and politician (born 1926)

Member of the Colorado Senate from the 18th district

Personal details
- Born: October 20, 1926 (age 99) Meadow Grove, Nebraska, U.S.
- Spouse: Richard Rupert
- Occupation: Teacher, counselor, politician

Dorothy Belle Rupert (born October 20, 1926) is an American politician who served as a member in the Colorado Senate from the 18th district.

== Early life ==
On October 20, 1926, Rupert was born on a farm in Meadow Grove, Nebraska.

== Education ==
In 1948, Rupert earned a Bachelor of Arys degree from Nebraska Wesleyan University in Lincoln, Nebraska. In 1967, Rupert earned a master's degree in counseling and psych from University of Colorado Boulder. In 1993, Rupert earned a degree from Harvard University.

== Career ==
Rupert is a former teacher and counselor in Colorado public schools.

In 1958, Rupert became a member of the city council in Thornton, Colorado, until 1961.

In 2009, Rupert became a co-founder of Growing Up Boulder.

== Awards ==
- 2016 Stan Black Award. Presented by Community Foundation Boulder County.

== Personal life ==
Rupert's husband is Richard Rupert. In 1960, Rupert and her family moved to Boulder, Colorado. They have two children.

In 2001, Rupert's husband had a stroke and later had Alzheimer's Disease. While Rupert lived in Colorado, her husband was relocated to a nursing home in Louisiana.
