= Peter Groff =

American politician

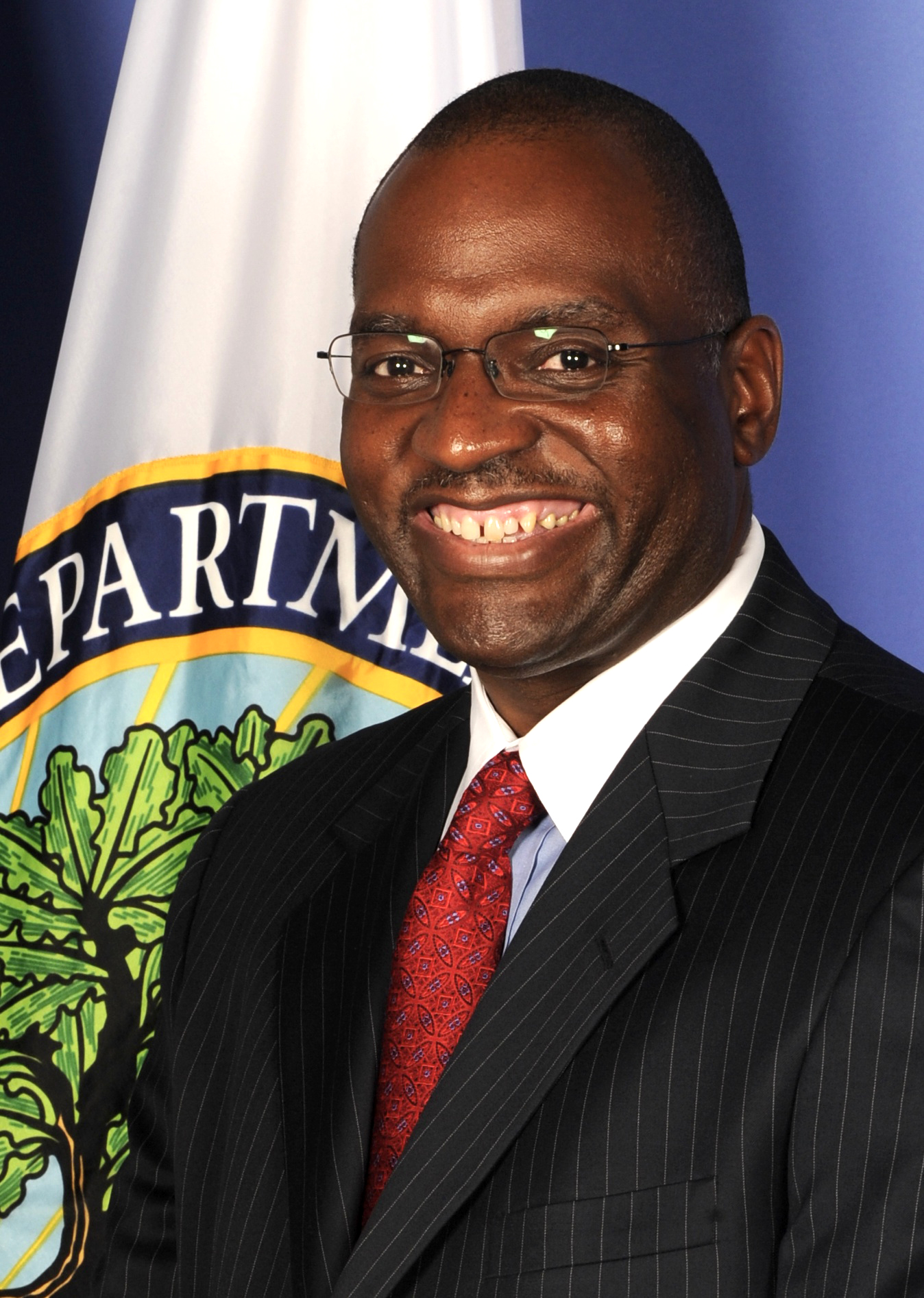

Member of the Colorado Senate from the 33rd district
- In office February 17, 2003 – May 9, 2009
- Preceded by: Penfield Tate III
- Succeeded by: Mike Johnston

Member of the Colorado House of Representatives from the 7th district
- In office January 10, 2001 – February 14, 2003
- Preceded by: Ben Clarke
- Succeeded by: Terrance Carroll

Personal details
- Born: April 21, 1963 (age 63) Chicago, Illinois, U.S.
- Party: Democratic
- Spouse: Regina
- Education: University of Redlands (BA); University of Denver (JD)

Peter C. Groff (born April 21, 1963) is a former member of the Obama administration and a former Colorado legislator and President of the Colorado Senate. An attorney, public servant, and political veteran, Groff was elected as a Democrat to the Colorado House of Representatives in 2000, then re-elected in 2002. In 2003, he was appointed to the Colorado Senate, where he represented Senate District 33, which includes northeastern Denver, Colorado. Groff was the first African-American to serve as Colorado Senate president pro tem and Senate President. In May 2009, he was selected by President Barack Obama to head the faith- based-initiatives center for the U.S. Department of Education.

== Early career ==
Born in Chicago, Illinois, Groff earned a bachelor's degree in communications with a minor in political science from the University of Redlands in 1985 and a J.D. from the University of Denver College of Law in 1992. He worked as an assistant to Denver city council member Allegra Haynes from 1991 to 1994 and then for Denver mayor Wellington Webb from 1994 to 1997. In 1997, Groff helped found the Center for African American Policy at the University of Denver, and, since then, has served as the center's executive director, in addition to work as an attorney with Vaden and Evans, LLC.

Groff is married to Rev. Dr. Regina C. Groff, the former pastor of Campbell Chapel AME Church in Denver. They have two children, Malachi Charles and Moriah Cherie.

== Political career ==
Groff managed or worked on a number of Colorado political campaigns during the 1990s; he was deputy political director for Roy Romer's 1994 gubernatorial campaign, and chaired the 1998 Denver Public Schools Mill Levy and Bond Campaign and managed Denver councilwoman Allegra Haynes 1999 re-election campaign.

In 2000, Groff ran for, and was elected to, the Colorado House of Representatives. After being re-elected in 2002, Groff was appointed to the Colorado Senate in February 2003 to fill the vacancy left by the resignation of Sen. Penfield Tate III; he became only the 6th African-American state senator in Colorado history, occupying the Senate seat previous held by his father, Sen. Regis Groff.

Sometimes called the "Conscience of the Senate", and regarded as a "pragmatic and deliberative" leader, Groff was named Senate president pro tem in 2005. Following the resignation of Senate President Joan Fitz-Gerald in November 2007, Groff was tapped to become Senate President, and had already begun handling some of Fitz-Gerald's responsibilities during her Congressional campaign. Groff formally assumed the role of Senate President in January 2008, at the start of the legislative session. He is the highest-ranking African-American elected official in Colorado, and is the first to lead either chamber of the Colorado General Assembly.

In the 2007 session of the Colorado Legislature, Groff was a member of the Senate Appropriations Committee, the Senate Legal Services Committee, and was the chair of the Senate State, Veterans & Military Affairs Committee.

After Senator Ken Salazar was tapped by President-Elect Barack Obama to be United States Secretary of the Interior, a number of names came up as a possible replacements for Salazar to be appointed by Governor Bill Ritter, and Groff was among the names.
