= Gloria Tanner =

American politician

Member of the Colorado Senate from the 33rd district
- In office 1994–2000

Colorado House of Representatives
- In office 1985–1994

Personal details
- Born: Gloria Travis; July 16, 1935 Atlanta, Georgia
- Died: April 4, 2022 (aged 86) Denver, Colorado
- Party: Democratic
- Spouse: Theodore Ralph Tanner
- Children: 3
- Occupation: Journalist, real estate agent

Gloria Travis Tanner (July 16, 1935 – April 4, 2022) was a politician and public figure in Colorado. A Democrat, she served in the Colorado House of Representatives from 1985-1994. In 1994, she became the first African American woman to serve as a Colorado state senator. In 2000, she founded a leadership and training institute for black women in Colorado. She was inducted into the Colorado Women's Hall of Fame in 2002.

== Early life and education ==
Gloria Travis was born in Atlanta, Georgia, to Marcellus Travis and Blanche Arnold Travis. She is one of five sisters.

Before attending college, she was an administrative assistant for the Office of Hearings and Appeals at the United States Department of the Interior from 1967 to 1972. She reported for the Denver Weekly News, an African American newspaper, from 1972 to 1976, and also worked as a real estate agent.

She earned her bachelor's degree in political science from the Metropolitan State University of Denver in 1974 and her master's degree in urban affairs at the University of Colorado in 1976.

== Political career ==
In 1976 Tanner began working as the executive assistant to Colorado lieutenant governor George L. Brown. In 1978 she became executive director of communications for Colorado state senator Regis Groff.

She successfully ran for a seat in the Colorado State House of Representatives for the 7th district in 1985. She became the second African American to fill a leadership position in the house with her election as House Minority Caucus leader in 1987, a position she held until 1990. Upon the resignation of Groff in 1994, Tanner was appointed to replace him. This appointment made her the first African American woman state senator in Colorado history. Representing District 33 as a Democrat, she served as a member of the senate's joint budget committee and "sponsored and passed significant legislation pertaining to civil rights for women and minorities, marital discrimination in the workplace, parental responsibility, workers' compensation cost savings, and parental rights for adoptive parents". She retired from the senate as of January 1, 2001.

== Leadership and training institute ==
In October 2000 she announced the establishment of the Senator Gloria Tanner Leadership and Training Institute for Future Black Women Leaders of Colorado. This institute grooms black women to serve in the state government, on commissions, and on boards.

== Other activities ==
Tanner was the instigator and co-founder of Colorado Black Women for Political Action, founded in 1977, and past chair of the Colorado Caucus of Black Elected Officials. In 1998 she was elected president of the National Organization of Black Elected Legislators/Women.

== Awards and honors ==
Tanner was named "2000 Legislator of the Year" by the Colorado Association of Community Centered Boards, and was a co-winner of "Legislator of the Year" by the Colorado Trial Lawyers Association in 1998. She received the "Leadership Denver" award from the Metro Denver Chamber of Commerce.

She was inducted into the Colorado Women's Hall of Fame in 2002.

== Personal life ==
In 1955, she married Theodore Ralph Tanner, with whom she had two daughters and a son.
