= Jessie Ulibarri =

American politician

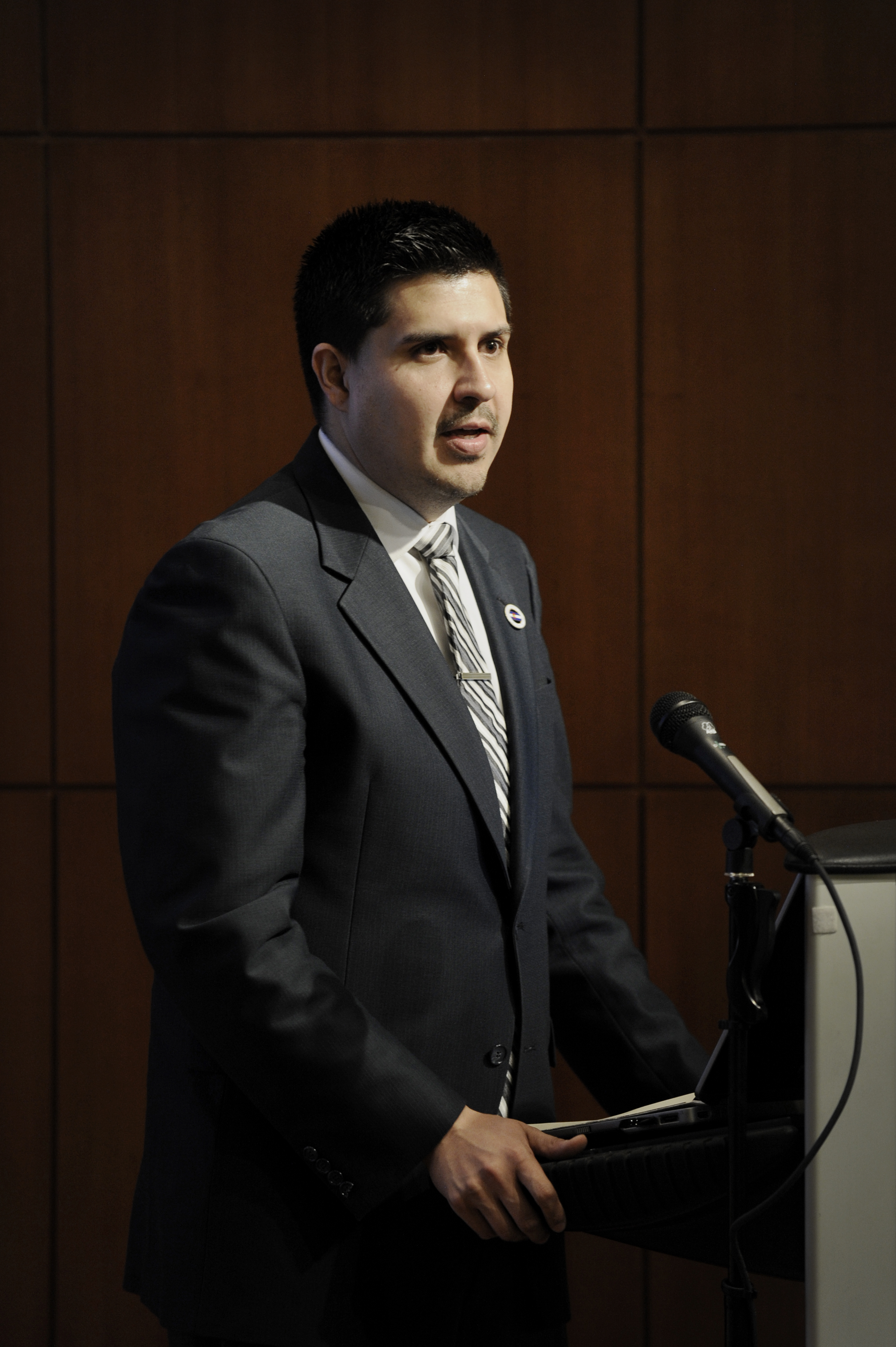

Member of the Colorado Senate from the 21st district
- In office January 9, 2013 – January 11, 2017
- Preceded by: Betty Boyd
- Succeeded by: Dominick Moreno

Personal details
- Party: Democratic

Jessie Ulibarri is an American politician from Commerce City, Colorado. A Democrat, Ulibarri served four years in the Colorado Senate representing District 21 in Adams County. Ulibarri worked on the 2013 bill to allow Colorado same-sex couples to form civil unions.

== Biography ==
Ulibarri graduated from the University of Colorado, and became the first person in his family to receive a bachelor's degree. In 2013, Ulibarri completed Harvard University's John F. Kennedy School of Government program for senior executives in state and local government as a David Bohnett LGBTQ Victory Institute leadership fellow. His employment history includes working as a policy fellow with the office of Congressman Luis Gutierrez (D-Illinois), as public policy director with the ACLU of Colorado, and as senior managing associate for JVA Consulting.

Ulibarri was elected to the senate in 2012, beating Republican Francine Bigelow 64%-36%. His candidacy was endorsed by the Colorado Conservation Voters and the Gay & Lesbian Victory Fund. He did not run for re-election in 2016. Ulibarri is currently the director of the State Innovation Exchange.

He now lives in Pittsburgh, Pennsylvania, with his partner, Louis. They have two children.
