= Angela Williams (politician) =

American politician from Colorado

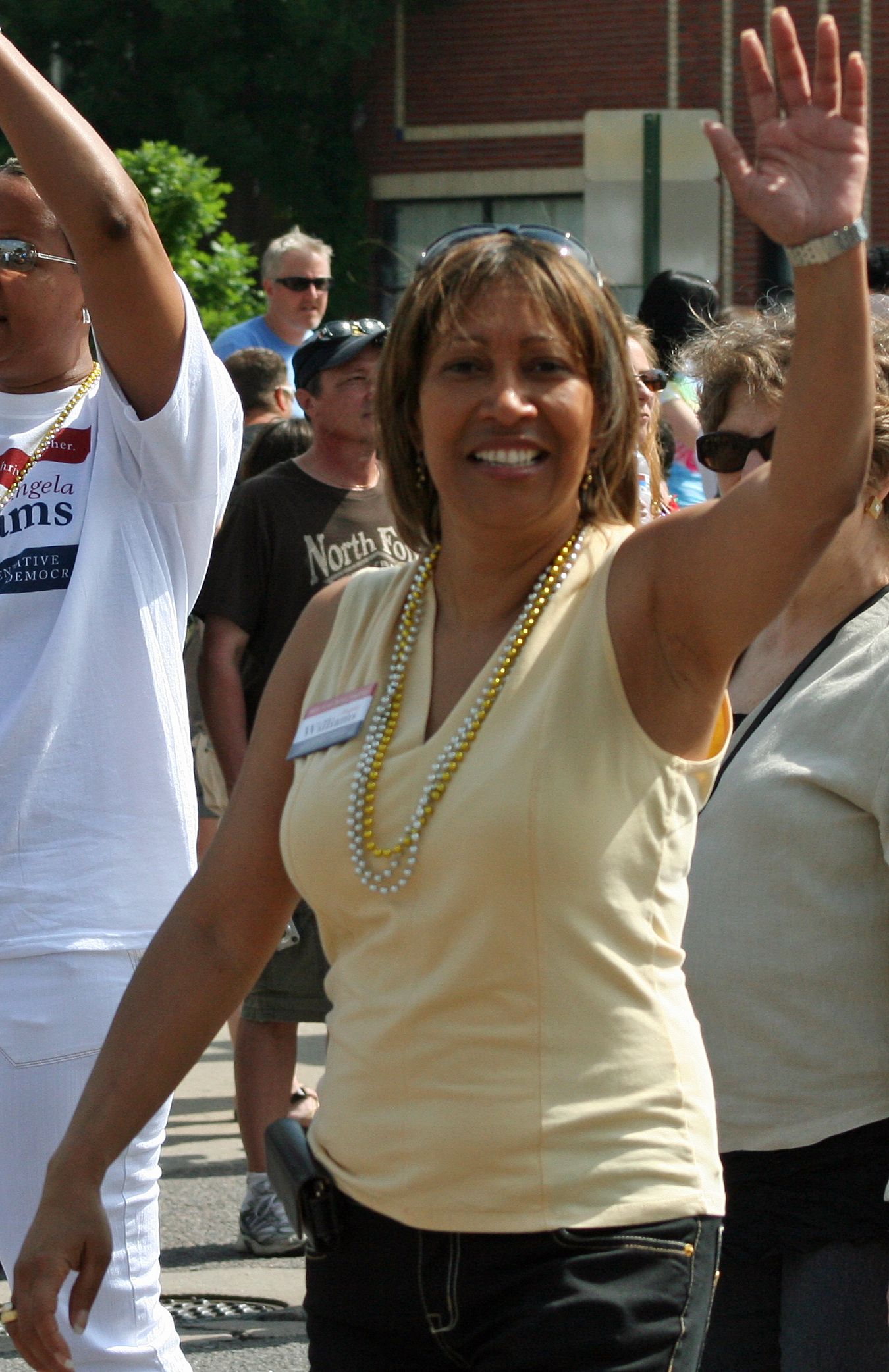
- Williams in 2010

Member of the Colorado Senate from the 33rd district
- In office January 11, 2017 – January 13, 2021
- Preceded by: Mike Johnston
- Succeeded by: James Coleman

Member of the Colorado House of Representatives from the 7th district
- In office January 11, 2011 – January 11, 2017
- Preceded by: Terrance Carroll
- Succeeded by: James Coleman

Personal details
- Born: February 14, 1964 (age 62) Morris, Oklahoma
- Party: Democratic
- Occupation: Politician

Angela Williams (February 14, 1964) is an American politician from Colorado. Elected to the Colorado House of Representatives as a Democrat in 2010, Williams represented House District 7, which encompasses the northeast part of Denver, including the neighborhoods of Montbello and Green Valley Ranch, and the Denver International Airport.

In 2016, she was elected to the Colorado Senate representing District 33, Which includes the communities of Curtis Park, Whittier, Five Points, Cole, Park Hill, Stapleton, East Colfax, Green Valley Ranch, Montbello, and Denver International Airport. She previously ran for the United States Senate.

== Early life and education ==
Williams grew up in Morris, Oklahoma, on her parents' farm, where they raised cattle and fresh vegetables. Her father worked for a glass manufacturer and was a proud and active member of the local union. Her mother stayed at home before eventually working as a seamstress and dietician for the local schools. Williams is one of seven brothers and sisters, each of whom is a first-generation college graduate.

Williams graduated from Northeastern State University with a Bachelor of Science degree. After graduating, she went to work in the nonprofit sector in human resources. She moved to Colorado in 1988, and later joined the private sector as a process improvement manager in telecommunications and technology. She then went on to become an entrepreneur, opening her own business, becoming the principal owner of the Angela Williams Allstate Insurance Agency for 12 years. She has served on numerous nonprofit boards focused on youth and leadership development, education, seniors and more. She is the mother of a son, Brandon.

== Legislative career ==
William's legislative career began with her run for office in 2009, when she was elected as the state representative for District 7 in the Colorado House of Representatives. During her six years in the House, she served as Chair of the Business Affairs & Labor and Audit Committee and was the first African American female to serve as the House Majority Caucus Chair. Angela founded the Colorado Black Democratic Legislative Caucus and helped elect what is now known as the Historic Eight, the largest number of black legislators to serve simultaneously in the history of Colorado.

In 2017, she ran successfully for the Colorado State Senate and currently serves as the senator for District 33, the most diverse Senate district in Colorado. She is Chairwoman of the Business Labor & Technology Committee and vice-chair of the Local Government Committee. She also serves as a member of the Legislative Council Committee.

Williams is known for working with labor organizations and the business community together to work towards passing bipartisan policies throughout Colorado. As a woman of color serving in the Colorado legislature, promoting legislation that advances equity for all women and the underserved is important to her. She has been nationally recognized for her work rebuilding trust between communities and police, leading the fight to increase the use of body cameras, increase police department transparency, and improve police training. She reformed Colorado's 40-year-old telecommunications laws and 80-year old liquor laws.

Williams is most known for her biggest accomplishments in the Colorado legislature including successfully passing the ASSET law, which allows undocumented students to attend college with in-state tuition. She passed the Compensation for the Wrongly Convicted Law, which compensates exonerated individuals with $70,000 for each year spent in prison. She is also proud of the passing of the 2019 FAMLI bill, which will create a family medical leave program after a study and implementation period. Williams passion to help women, minority, disabled and LGBTQ businesses led her to pass legislation in 2019 that will require the state of Colorado to perform its first disparity study in state procurement of contracts.

== 2020 United States Senate and Colorado State Senate elections ==
On July 8, 2019, State Senator Angela Williams announced her candidacy for the United States Senate, vying for the Democratic nomination to challenge incumbent Senator Cory Gardner. However, she announced she was dropping out of the race in late November 2019 and said she would run instead for re-election to the state senate.

Then, on January 6, 2020, Williams announced that she would not be seeking re-election to the Colorado State Senate.

== Achievements ==
Angela holds a certificate of completion from the John F. Kennedy School of Government at Harvard University. She is a graduate of the Henry Toll Fellowship program. She has also completed the Colorado Foundation for Water Education professional development program and is affiliated with several national organizations. She serves on committees of the National Conference of State Legislators and the National Black Caucus of State Legislators. Other affiliations include Higher Heights for America, Delta Sigma Theta, National Social Action Commission and National Organization of Black Elected Legislative Women, and the National Association for the Advancement of Colored People. She has been recognized with numerous awards during her tenure as a public servant.
