= Chris VanDijk =

American politician

Member-elect of the Colorado House of Representatives from the 32nd district
- Assuming office January 2027
- Succeeding: María González

Personal details
- Party: Democratic
- Education: University of Utah; University of Colorado Denver
- Website: Campaign website

Christopher (Chris) VanDijk is an American politician. A member of the Democratic Party, he is the member-elect for the 32nd district of the Colorado House of Representatives. He is a firefighter with the South Adams County Fire Department.
