= Dominick Moreno =

American politician

Dom Moreno
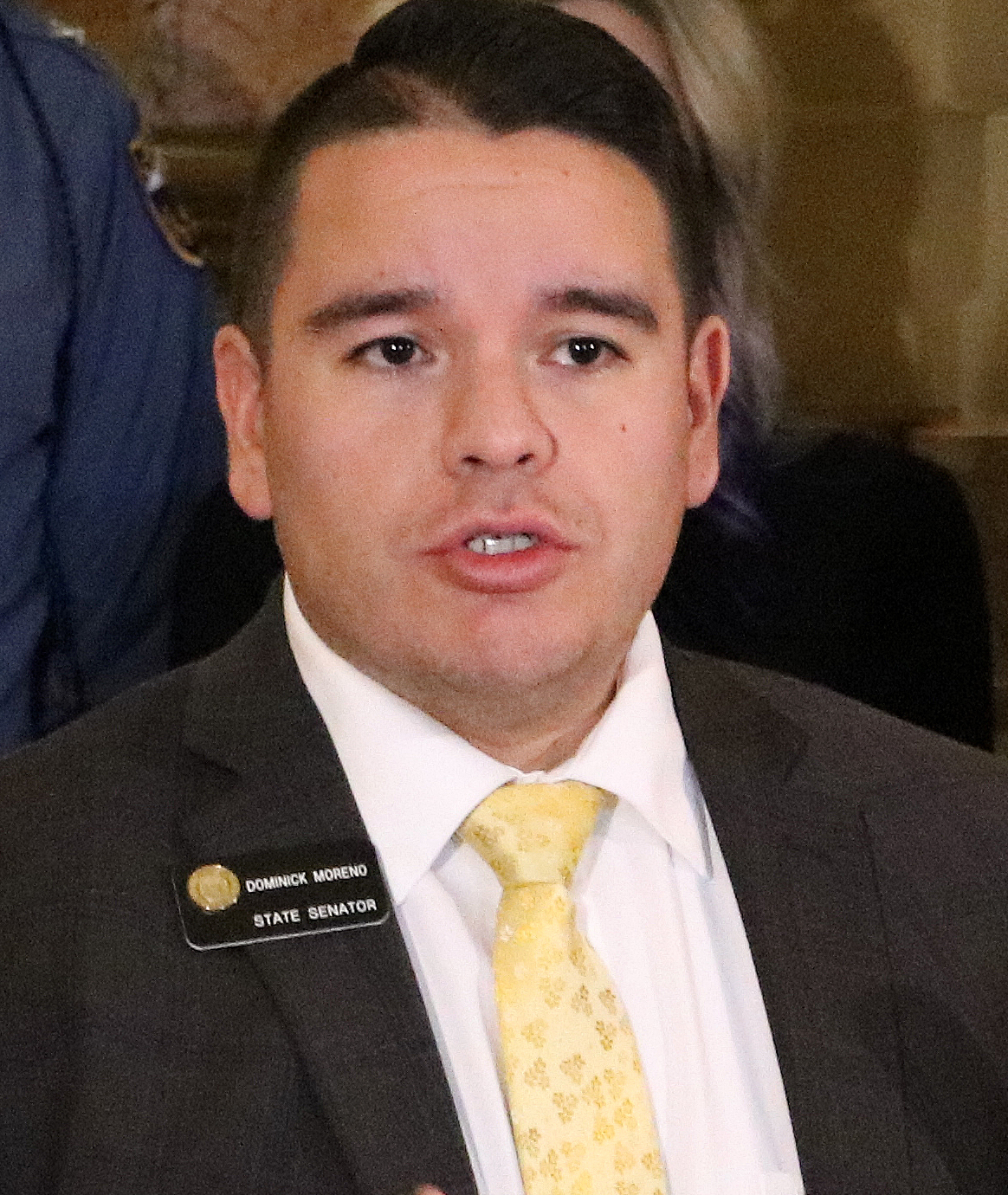

Majority Leader of the Colorado Senate
- In office February 23, 2022 – September 1, 2023
- Preceded by: Steve Fenberg
- Succeeded by: Robert Rodriguez

Member of the Colorado Senate from the 21st district
- In office January 11, 2017 – September 1, 2023
- Preceded by: Jessie Ulibarri
- Succeeded by: Dafna Michaelson Jenet

Member of the Colorado House of Representatives from the 32nd district
- In office January 2013 – January 11, 2017
- Preceded by: Ed Casso
- Succeeded by: Adrienne Benavidez

Personal details
- Born: February 7, 1985 (age 41) Commerce City, Colorado, U.S.
- Party: Democratic
- Education: Georgetown University (BA)
- Website: Official website

Dominick Moreno (born February 7, 1985) is an American politician who served as a state legislator in Colorado. A Democrat, Moreno represented the 21st district of the Colorado Senate from January 11, 2017 until he resigned on September 1, 2023 to serve as deputy chief of staff to Denver Mayor Mike Johnston. Before his election to the senate, he represented the 32nd district in the Colorado House of Representatives from 2012 to 2016.

== Biography ==
=== Early life and education ===
Moreno was born and raised in Commerce City, Colorado, and earned a B.A. in American Government from Georgetown University. Coming from a working-class family, Moreno was able to afford tuition at the institution as a consequence of generous scholarships he received. Moreno returned to Colorado to work in retail and the service industry. Throughout his time at Georgetown, he spent breaks abroad teaching English in northern Mexico in the village of Palmitas.

After graduation, Moreno moved back to Colorado and served for two years on the city council of Commerce City. In 2017, Moreno completed Harvard University's John F. Kennedy School of Government program for Senior Executives in State and Local Government as a David Bohnett LGBTQ Victory Institute Leadership Fellow.

== Legislative career ==
Prior to his election to the state legislature, Moreno worked as a legislative aide to Ed Casso, his predecessor as the district's representative. He is openly gay, and became one of five LGBT members of the state House of Representatives. Others are Speaker of the House Mark Ferrandino, Representative Joann Ginal, Representative Paul Rosenthal and Representative Sue Schafer.

=== 2012 election ===
In the 2012 general election, Moreno faced Republican challenger Paul Reimer. Moreno was elected by a wide margin of 67% to 28%.

=== School board service ===
In July 2018, Moreno was appointed to fill a vacancy in the Adams County School District 14 school board, filling out the term of a board member who resigned. Moreno is a graduate of schools in the district and continued to serve in the General Assembly.

Colorado Senate
Preceded by Steve Fenberg	Majority Leader of the Colorado Senate; 2022–2023	Succeeded by Robert Rodriguez
