= Colorado's 32nd House of Representatives district =

American legislative district

Colorado's 32nd State House of Representatives district
Representative
| María González; D–Commerce City |
- Demographics: 38% White; 3% Black; 53% Hispanic; 2% Asian; 0% Native American; 3% Multiracial
- Population (2024): 92,974

Colorado's 32nd House of Representatives district is one of 65 districts in the Colorado House of Representatives. It was represented by Manny Rutinel from October 13, 2023 to September 4, 2026, when he resigned to run for congress. On October 9, 2026, Governor Jared Polis appointed María González to fill the vacancy created by Rutinel's resignation.

== Members ==
- Manny Rutinel
- María González (2026)
- Chris VanDijk
