= 2002 Colorado gubernatorial election =

- November 5, 2002
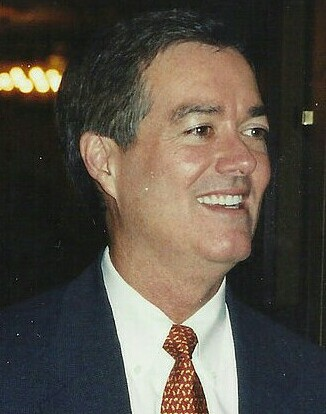

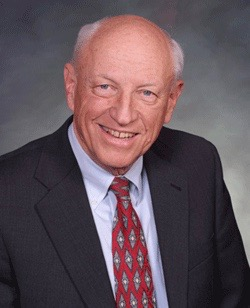
Nominee	Bill Owens	Rollie Heath
Party	Republican	Democratic
Running mate	Jane Norton	Bill Thiebaut
Popular vote	884,583	475,373
Percentage	62.62%	33.65%
- County results Owens: 40–50% 50–60% 60–70% 70–80% 80–90% Heath: 40–50% 50–60%
Governor before election
Bill Owens
Republican
Elected Governor
Bill Owens
Republican

The 2002 Colorado gubernatorial election was held on November 5, 2002, to elect the governor of Colorado. Bill Owens, the Republican incumbent, defeated Democratic nominee Rollie Heath to win a second term. Owen's win set the record for biggest win by a Republican in a Colorado gubernatorial election (Democrats won by larger margins in 1982, 1948, and 1928, with Billy Adams' 35 point blowout in that year being the greatest victory for a candidate of any party). As of 2026, this is the last time a Republican was elected governor of Colorado, and the only time in the past half-century that a Republican won a majority in the state.

== Republican primary ==
=== Candidates ===
- Bill Owens, incumbent governor of Colorado

=== Results ===
Republican primary results
Party	Candidate	Votes	%
Republican	Bill Owens (incumbent)	189,705	100.00
Total votes		189,705	100.00

== Democratic primary ==
=== Candidates ===
- Rollie Heath, businessman

=== Results ===
Democratic primary results
Party	Candidate	Votes	%
Democratic	Rollie Heath	98,897	100.00
Total votes		98,897	100.00

== General election ==
=== Debates ===
2002 Colorado gubernatorial election debates
No.	Date	Host	Moderator	Link	Republican	Democratic
Key: P Participant A Absent N Not invited I Invited W Withdrawn						
Key: P Participant A Absent N Not invited I Invited W Withdrawn					Bill Owens	Rollie Heath
1	Sep. 7, 2002	Club 20; KJCT-TV	Jerry Groswald	C-SPAN	P	P
2	Sep. 24, 2002	City Club of Denver		C-SPAN	P	P
3	Oct. 17, 2002	KUSA (TV); The Denver Post	Jim Benemann	C-SPAN	P	P

=== Predictions ===
Source	Ranking	As of
The Cook Political Report	Safe R	October 31, 2002
Sabato's Crystal Ball	Safe R	November 4, 2002

=== Results ===
2002 Colorado gubernatorial election
Party	Candidate	Votes	%	±%
Republican	Bill Owens (inc.)	884,583	62.62%	+13.58%
Democratic	Rollie Heath	475,373	33.65%	−14.77%
Green	Ronald Forthofer	32,099	2.27%	–
Libertarian	Ralph Shnelvar	20,547	1.45%	−0.23%
Majority		409,210	28.97%	+28.34%
Turnout		1,412,602		
Republican hold				

==== By county ====
County	Bill Owens Republican		Rollie Heath Democratic		Various candidates Other parties		Margin		Total votes cast
County	#	%	#	%	#	%	#	%	Total votes cast
Adams	50,623	60.01%	31,551	37.40%	2,189	2.59%	19,072	22.61%	84,363
Alamosa	2,611	56.17%	1,913	41.16%	124	2.67%	698	15.01%	4,648
Arapahoe	101,542	66.99%	46,260	30.52%	3,772	2.49%	55,282	36.47%	151,574
Archuleta	2,885	72.47%	994	24.97%	102	2.56%	1,891	47.50%	3,981
Baca	1,653	75.93%	501	23.01%	23	1.06%	1,152	52.92%	2,177
Bent	1,266	65.70%	630	32.69%	31	1.58%	636	33.01%	1,927
Boulder	46,964	44.12%	50,829	47.76%	8,643	8.12%	-3,865	-3.64%	106,436
Broomfield	9,307	65.54%	4,414	31.08%	479	3.38%	4,893	34.46%	14,200
Chaffee	4,187	60.86%	2,394	34.80%	299	4.34%	1,793	26.06%	6,880
Cheyenne	890	83.57%	165	15.49%	10	0.94%	725	68.08%	1,065
Clear Creek	2,348	58.05%	1,466	36.24%	231	5.71%	882	21.81%	4,045
Conejos	1,841	57.05%	1,339	41.49%	47	1.46%	502	15.56%	3,227
Costilla	780	48.81%	762	47.68%	56	3.51%	18	1.13%	1,598
Crowley	904	69.27%	374	28.66%	27	2.07%	530	40.61%	1,305
Custer	1,499	75.94%	409	20.72%	66	3.34%	1,090	55.22%	1,974
Delta	7,925	70.52%	2,738	24.36%	575	5.12%	5,187	46.16%	11,238
Denver	67,959	44.40%	78,838	51.51%	2,788	4.09%	-6,268	-7.11%	153,065
Dolores	519	60.51%	298	34.81%	39	4.68%	221	25.70%	856
Douglas	58,519	79.08%	14,182	19.17%	1,295	1.75%	44,337	59.91%	73,996
Eagle	7,030	60.20%	4,256	36.45%	391	3.35%	2,774	23.75%	11,677
El Paso	114,263	74.73%	32,680	21.37%	5,950	3.90%	81,583	53.36%	152,893
Elbert	6,415	79.97%	1,448	18.05%	159	1.98%	4,967	61.92%	8,022
Fremont	8,968	64.08%	4,599	32.86%	428	3.06%	4,369	31.22%	13,995
Garfield	8,856	63.79%	4,438	31.97%	589	4.24%	4,418	31.82%	13,883
Gilpin	1,277	55.74%	831	36.27%	183	7.99%	446	19.47%	2,291
Grand	3,502	69.48%	1,356	26.90%	182	3.62%	2,146	42.58%	5,040
Gunnison	2,634	48.52%	2,428	44.72%	367	6.76%	206	3.80%	5,429
Hinsdale	334	62.31%	161	30.04%	41	7.65%	173	32.27%	536
Huerfano	1,602	57.01%	1,131	40.25%	77	2.74%	471	16.76%	2,810
Jackson	654	77.49%	165	19.55%	25	2.96%	489	57.94%	844
Jefferson	122,536	64.70%	60,656	32.08%	5,907	3.22%	61,880	32.62%	189,099
Kiowa	721	78.71%	188	20.52%	7	0.77%	533	58.19%	916
Kit Carson	2,520	81.82%	520	16.88%	40	1.30%	2,000	64.93%	3,080
La Plata	9,022	56.55%	5,952	37.31%	980	6.14%	3,070	19.24%	15,954
Lake	1,340	55.74%	943	39.23%	121	5.03%	397	16.51%	2,404
Larimer	60,727	64.83%	27,931	29.82%	5,015	5.35%	32,796	35.01%	93,673
Las Animas	2,690	52.12%	2,363	45.79%	108	2.09%	327	6.33%	5,161
Lincoln	1,489	75.39%	461	23.34%	25	1.27%	1,028	52.05%	1,975
Logan	4,977	73.96%	1,638	24.34%	114	1.70%	3,339	49.62%	6,729
Mesa	27,234	66.73%	12,255	30.03%	1,322	3.24%	14,979	36.70%	40,811
Mineral	276	61.88%	154	34.53%	16	3.59%	122	27.35%	446
Moffat	3,318	73.36%	1,091	24.12%	114	2.52%	2,227	49.24%	4,523
Montezuma	5,311	66.40%	2,363	29.54%	325	4.06%	2,948	36.86%	7,999
Montrose	8,644	70.16%	3,217	26.11%	459	3.73%	5,427	44.05%	12,320
Morgan	5,657	73.75%	1,884	24.56%	129	1.69%	3,773	49.19%	7,670
Otero	4,112	66.52%	1,989	32.17%	81	1.31%	2,123	34.35%	6,182
Ouray	1,177	62.11%	621	32.77%	97	5.12%	556	29.34%	1,895
Park	4,057	68.62%	1,505	25.46%	350	5.92%	2,552	43.16%	5,912
Phillips	1,516	79.00%	376	19.59%	27	1.50%	1,140	59.41%	1,919
Pitkin	3,096	51.14%	2,613	43.16%	345	5.70%	483	7.98%	6,054
Prowers	2,898	72.20%	1,071	26.68%	45	1.12%	1,827	45.52%	4,014
Pueblo	24,059	48.96%	24,401	49.65%	682	1.39%	-342	-0.69%	49,142
Rio Blanco	1,922	78.32%	482	19.64%	50	2.04%	1,440	58.68%	2,454
Rio Grande	3,107	68.41%	1,349	29.70%	86	1.89%	1,758	38.71%	4,542
Routt	4,525	60.28%	2,596	34.58%	386	5.14%	1,929	25.70%	7,507
Saguache	1,038	51.31%	872	43.10%	113	5.59%	166	8.21%	2,023
San Juan	206	50.49%	154	37.75%	48	11.76%	52	12.74%	408
San Miguel	1,085	43.52%	1,129	45.29%	279	11.19%	-44	-1.77%	2,493
Sedgwick	895	75.46%	279	23.52%	12	1.02%	616	51.94%	1,186
Summit	4,395	53.83%	3,241	39.70%	528	6.47%	1,154	14.13%	8,164
Teller	5,885	73.60%	1,772	22.16%	339	4.24%	4,113	51.44%	7,996
Washington	1,800	82.99%	338	15.58%	31	1.43%	1,462	67.41%	2,169
Weld	39,682	70.97%	14,670	26.24%	1,564	2.79%	25,012	44.73%	55,916
Yuma	3,090	79.41%	749	19.25%	52	1.34%	2,341	59.89%	3,891
Total	884,583	62.62%	475,373	33.65%	52,646	3.73%	411,210	28.97%	1,412,602

Counties that flipped from Democratic to Republican

- Routt (largest city: Steamboat Springs)
- Garfield (largest municipality: Glenwood Springs)
- Eagle (largest municipality: Edwards)
- Summit (largest municipality: Breckenridge)
- Clear Creek (largest city: Idaho Springs)
- Gilpin (largest city: Central City)
- Adams (largest city: Thornton)
- Gunnison (largest city: Gunnison)
- Lake (largest city: Leadville)
- Pitkin (largest city: Aspen)
- La Plata (largest municipality: Durango)
- San Juan (largest municipality: Silverton)
- Saguache (largest city: Center)
- Mineral (largest city: Creede)
- Conejos (largest municipality: Manassa)
- Costilla (largest municipality: San Luis)
- Las Animas (largest city: Trinidad)
- Huerfano (largest city: Walsenburg)
