= Colorado's 33rd Senate district =

American legislative district

Colorado's 33rd State Senate district
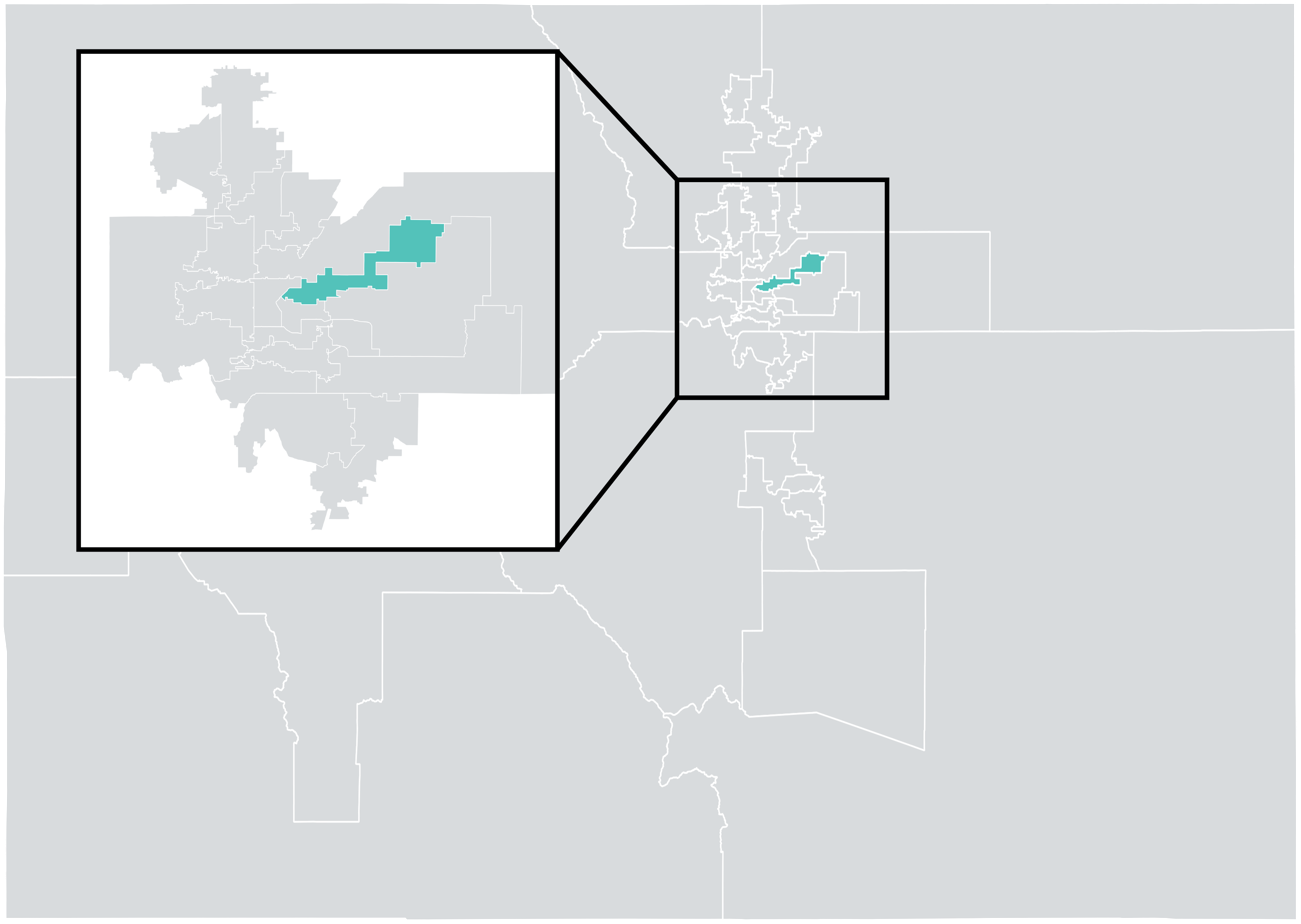
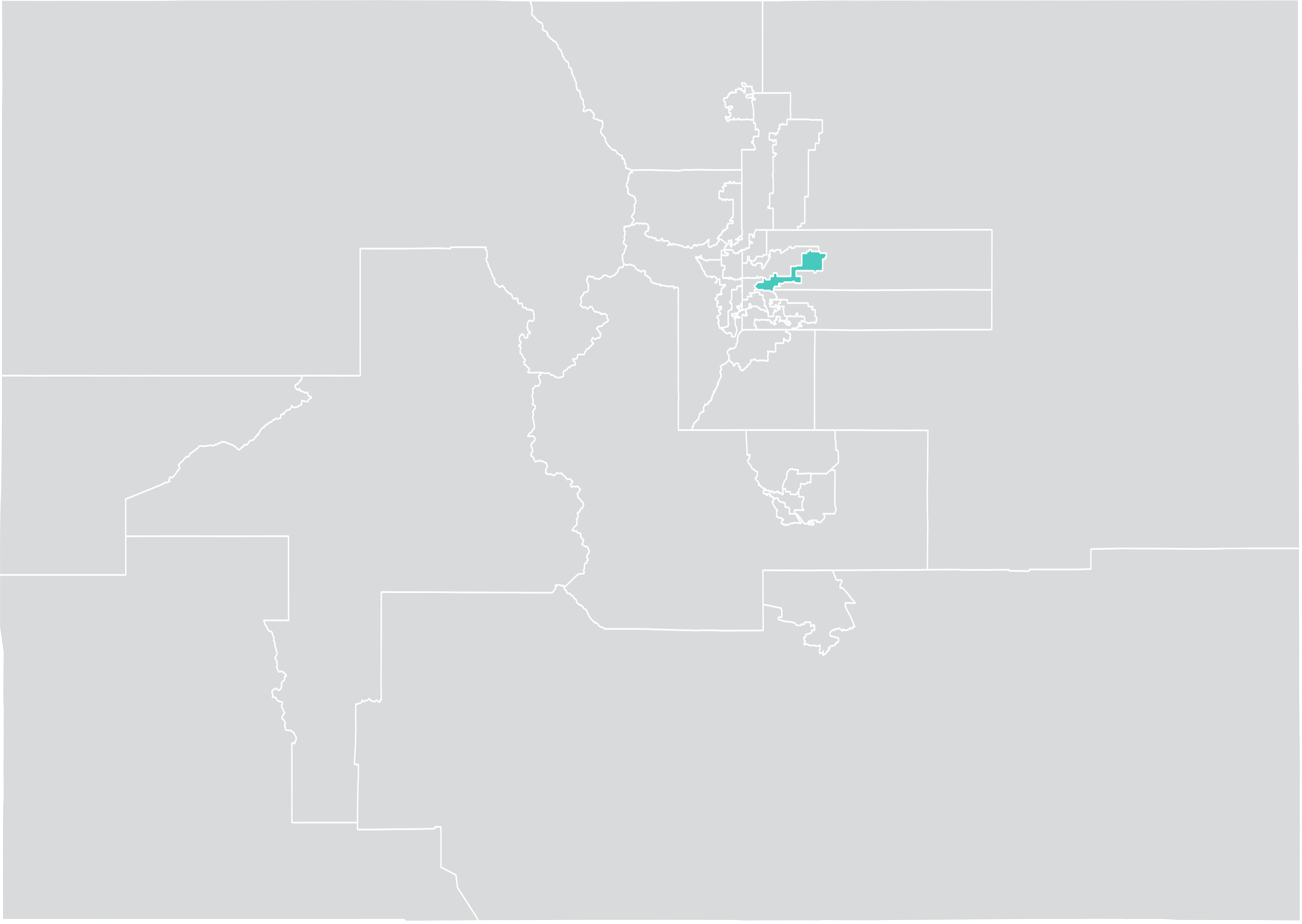
Senator
James Coleman; D–Denver
- Registration: 45.1% Democratic; 6.7% Republican; 45.8% No party preference
- Demographics: 40% White; 20% Black; 33% Hispanic; 3% Asian; 3% Other
- Population (2018): 179,613
- Registered voters: 121,195

Colorado's 33rd Senate district is one of 35 districts in the Colorado Senate. It has been represented by Democrat James Coleman since 2021, succeeding fellow Democrat Angela Williams.

== Geography ==
District 33 covers northern and northeastern Denver, including the Denver International Airport, the largest airport (by land area) in the country and the largest employer in the state.

The district is located entirely within Colorado's 1st congressional district, and overlaps with the 5th, 6th, 7th, and 8th districts of the Colorado House of Representatives.

== Recent election results ==
Colorado state senators are elected to staggered four-year terms; under normal circumstances, the 33rd district holds elections in presidential years.

=== 2020 ===
2020 Colorado State Senate election, District 33
Party	Candidate	Votes	%
Democratic	James Coleman	75,702	91.0
Unity	Jerry Burton	7,482	9.0
Total votes		83,184	100
Democratic hold			

=== 2016 ===
2016 Colorado State Senate election, District 33
Primary election
Party	Candidate	Votes	%
Democratic	Angela Williams	12,837	82.1
Democratic	Jon Biggerstaff	2,808	17.9
Total votes		15,645	100
General election
Democratic	Angela Williams	57,049	82.0
Republican	Raymon Doane	12,564	18.0
Total votes		69,613	100
Democratic hold			

=== 2012 ===
2012 Colorado State Senate election, District 33
Party	Candidate	Votes	%
Democratic	Mike Johnston (incumbent)	51,357	82.3
Republican	Jason DeBerry	8,456	13.6
Libertarian	Courtney Kolva	2,579	4.1
Total votes		62,392	100
Democratic hold			

=== Federal and statewide results ===
Year	Office	Results
2020	President	Biden 84.9 – 13.0%
2018	Governor	Polis 84.0 – 13.0%
2016	President	Clinton 81.8 – 12.0%
2014	Senate	Udall 80.5 – 15.4%
2014	Governor	Hickenlooper 82.9 – 13.5%
2012	President	Obama 83.9 – 14.4%
