= Peggy Kerns =

Colorado politician

Margaret "Peggy" Kerns (née Shoup; March 17, 1941 – November 14, 2020) was an American government ethics educator, government official, and state legislator in Colorado. From 1989 to 1997, she served in the Colorado House of Representatives as a Democrat. She was then appointed a government official by U.S. president Bill Clinton. She later became a leader in Government Ethics education. She was the first woman to serve as Minority Leader in the Colorado House.

She was born in Lexington, Ohio to Ronald and Marie Strausbaugh Shoup. She graduated from St. Aloysius High School in New Lexington in 1959 and received a B.A. degree in journalism in 1963 from Duquesne University in Pittsburgh where she met her husband Pat. They were married November 9, 1963. She graduated from the University of Colorado at Denver with a Masters in Public Administration. She had two children and four grandchildren.

She served on Aurora, Colorado's City Council for six years and was president of the school PTA at her children's school. She also served on charity boards. She co-sponsored the Colorado Charter Schools Act in 1993. She left the state house due to term limits.
