= 2016 Colorado Senate election =

2016 Colorado State Senate election
- November 8, 2016

18 of the 35 seats in the Colorado Senate 18 seats needed for a majority
- Turnout: 74.05%
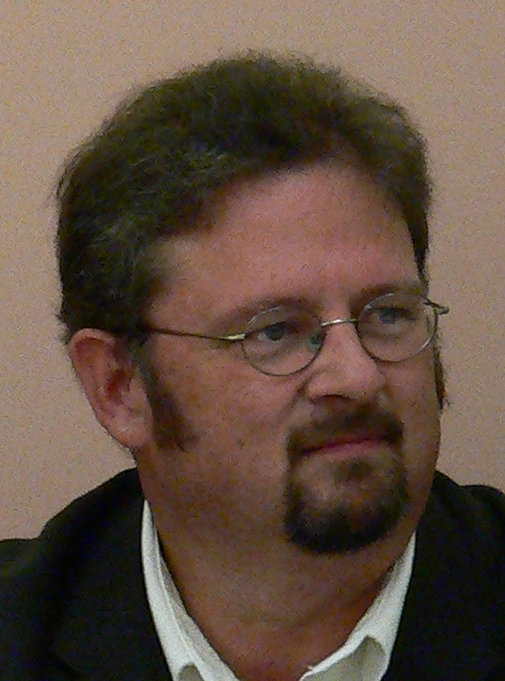

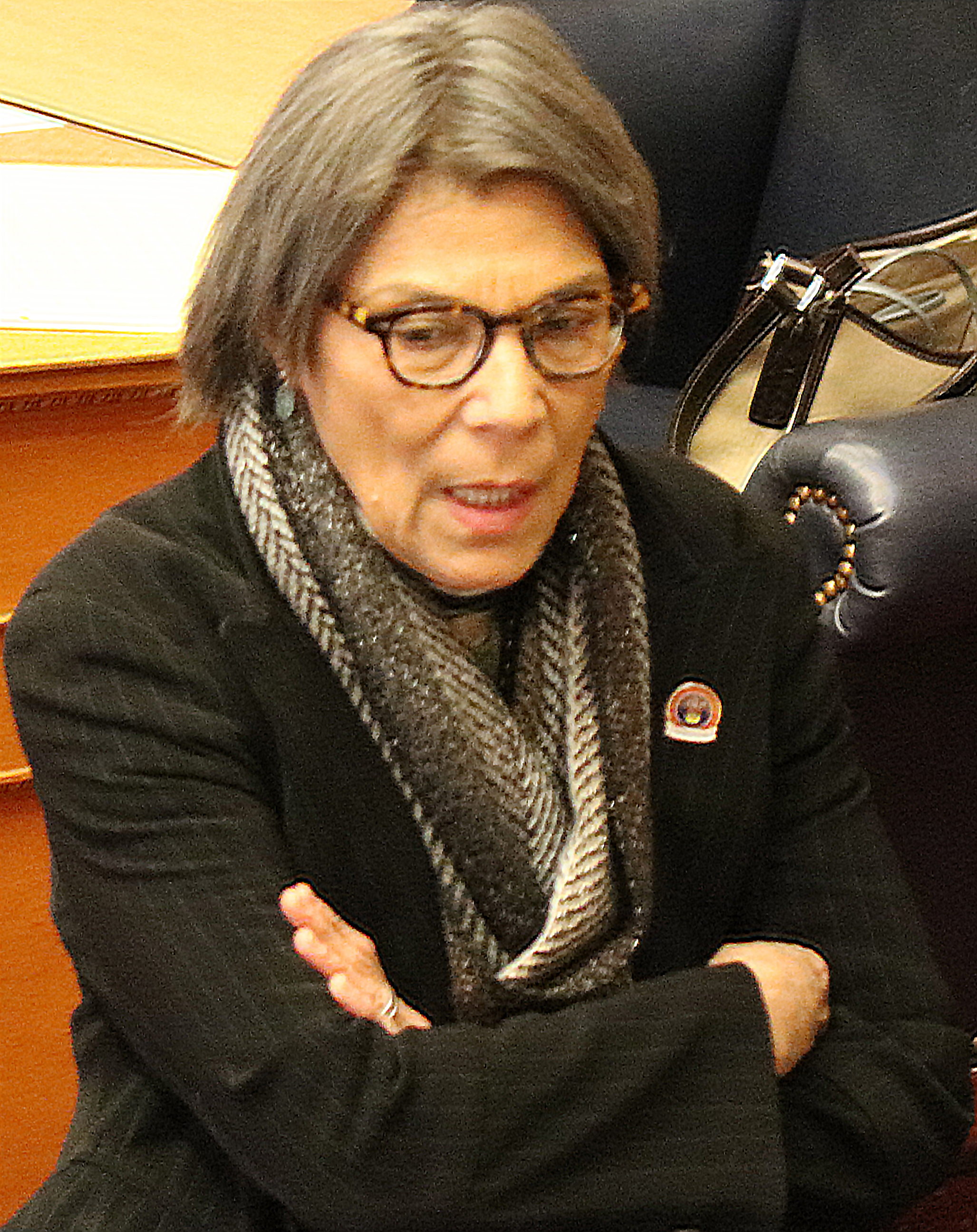
	Majority party	Minority party
Leader	Kevin Grantham	Lucía Guzmán
Party	Republican	Democratic
Leader's seat	District 2	District 34
Last election	18	17
Seats won	18	17
Seat change	Steady	Steady
Popular vote	580,873	697,521
Percentage	44.50%	53.44%
Seats up	8	10
Races won	8	10
- Results: Republican gain Democratic gain Republican hold Democratic hold No election
President before election
Bill Cadman
Republican
Elected President
Kevin Grantham
Republican

The 2016 Colorado State Senate elections were held on November 8, 2016 to elect 18 of the 35 members of Colorado's Senate. The election coincided with elections for other offices, including U.S. President, U.S. Senate, U.S. House of Representatives and state senate. The primary election was held on June 28, 2016.

There was no change in the composition of the Senate as both Democrats and Republicans gained one seat each, winning 10 and 8 seats respectively.

== Predictions ==
Source	Ranking	As of
Governing	Tossup	October 12, 2016

== Results ==
=== Statewide ===
Party	Candi- dates	Votes	%	Seats	+/–
Democratic Party	17	697,521	53.44%	10	Steady
Republican Party	16	580,873	44.50%	8	Steady
Libertarian Party	4	26,549	2.03%	0	Steady
Write-in	1	352	0.03%	0	Steady
Total	38	1,305,295	100.00%	18	Steady
Ballots Cast		1,464,250	74.05%		
Registered Voters		1,977,448			

=== District ===
Results of the 2016 Colorado Senate election by district:

District	Democratic		Republican		Others		Total		Ballots Cast	Regis- tered Voters	Turn- out	Result
District	Votes	%	Votes	%	Votes	%	Votes	%	Ballots Cast	Regis- tered Voters	Turn- out	Result
District 4	27,779	30.61%	62,981	69.39%	-	-	46,537	100.00%	99,340	123,851	80.21%	Republican Hold
District 8	32,530	45.15%	39,526	54.85%	-	-	51,931	100.00%	78,097	109,469	71.34%	Republican Hold
District 10	24,430	33.81%	47,832	66.19%	-	-	60,926	100.00%	79,571	108,792	73.14%	Republican Hold
District 12	-	-	45,938	75.30%	15,071	24.70%	34,564	100.00%	69,685	99,601	69.96%	Republican Hold
District 14	52,902	61.67%	32,886	38.33%	-	-	44,823	100.00%	94,244	123,636	76.23%	Democratic Hold
District 17	57,649	100.00%	-	-	-	-	65,292	100.00%	87,334	113,723	76.80%	Democratic Hold
District 18	67,799	79.61%	17,370	20.39%	-	-	39,725	100.00%	96,750	138,481	69.87%	Democratic Hold
District 19	39,070	47.78%	37,592	45.97%	5,112	6.25%	50,914	100.00%	86,231	109,881	78.48%	Democratic GAIN
District 21	38,428	99.09%	-	-	352	0.91%	56,955	100.00%	57,508	82,490	69.72%	Democratic Hold
District 23	40,281	42.04%	55,528	57.96%	-	-	29,633	100.00%	104,675	130,395	80.28%	Republican Hold
District 25	27,678	47.93%	30,074	52.07%	-	-	36,863	100.00%	62,734	87,100	72.03%	Republican GAIN
District 26	42,145	53.48%	36,666	46.52%	-	-	39,258	100.00%	83,698	111,841	74.84%	Democratic Hold
District 27	38,489	46.56%	44,169	53.44%	-	-	28,336	100.00%	87,965	110,010	79.96%	Republican Hold
District 28	39,143	55.73%	31,096	44.27%	-	-	29,380	100.00%	75,265	103,115	72.99%	Democratic Hold
District 29	30,998	54.19%	22,503	39.34%	3,698	6.47%	24,881	100.00%	60,944	90,676	67.21%	Democratic Hold
District 31	57,793	69.58%	25,268	30.42%	-	-	60,599	100.00%	93,908	126,671	74.14%	Democratic Hold
District 33	57,049	81.95%	12,564	18.05%	-	-	35,008	100.00%	78,099	114,270	68.35%	Democratic Hold
District 35	23,358	35.99%	38,880	59.90%	2,668	4.11%	55,927	100.00%	68,202	93,446	72.99%	Republican Hold
Total	697,521	53.44%	580,873	44.50%	26,901	2.06%	1,305,295	100.00%	1,464,250	1,977,448	74.05%	

== Closest races ==
1. District 19, 1.81% gain
2. District 25, 4.14%
3. District 27, 6.88% gain
4. District 26, 6.96%
5. District 8, 9.70%
