= Adrienne Benavidez =

American politician

Member of the Colorado Senate from the 21st district
- Incumbent
- Assumed office March 2, 2026
- Preceded by: Dafna Michaelson Jenet

Speaker pro tempore of the Colorado House of Representatives
- In office January 13, 2021 – January 5, 2023
- Preceded by: Janet Buckner
- Succeeded by: Chris Kennedy

Member of the Colorado House of Representatives for District 32
- In office January 11, 2017 – January 5, 2023
- Preceded by: Dominick Moreno
- Succeeded by: Lorena Garcia

Personal details
- Born: 1953 or 1954 (age 72–73) Denver, Colorado, U.S.
- Party: Democratic
- Children: 2
- Education: University of Colorado, Boulder (BA, JD)

Adrienne Benavidez (born 1953/1954) is a Democratic member of the Colorado Senate representing Senate District 21, since her appointment to fill the vacancy created by the resignation of Dafna Michaelson Jenet. Before serving in the Senate, she was a member of the Colorado House of Representatives. She represented District 32, which covered a portion of Adams County. She was elected in 2016, succeeding Dominick Moreno.

Prior to taking office, Benavidez worked as an attorney, was the executive director of the Denver Department of General Services, and directed the Colorado Division of Finance and Procurement. She served as chairwoman of the Rules Committee of the Colorado Democratic Party.

Benavidez served on the House Finance Committee, the House Judiciary Committee, and the House State, Veterans, and Military Affairs Committee.

== Colorado House of Representatives ==
Benavidez was elected to the House of Representatives in 2016, winning 64.37% of the vote against Republican opponent Alexander Jacobson.

During her tenure in the state House, Benavidez sponsored successful legislation that addressed toxic air pollutants as well as reforms to the state tax code. Her legacy legislation repealed the death penalty in the state of Colorado, replaced Columbus Day with Frances Xavier Cabrini Day and prohibited the use of Native American mascots in public schools. She is a staunch advocate for Latino issues in Colorado and supported Latino candidates for office as part of her outreach for her community.

In December 2022, just weeks after she was re-elected to a fourth term in the Colorado House, Benavidez announced she would resign from the house on January 5, 2023, four days before the beginning of the new General Assembly session. Her announcement followed her loss to Julie McCluskie in the race for house speaker.

Colorado House of Representatives
Preceded by Janet Buckner	Speaker pro tempore of the Colorado House of Representatives; 2021–2023	Succeeded by Chris Kennedy
