= La Palmita, Nuevo Leon =

La Palmita
- Village
- Interactive map of La Palmita
- Country: Mexico
- State: Nuevo León

Population
  - Total: 25

La Palmita is a small village in Nuevo Leon (NL), Mexico. It belongs to the municipality of Los Aldamas, NL and to the county of China, NL. It is close to San Agustin and the municipality of Los Herrera.

== Details ==
The village is currently home to 25 inhabitants. The village has been focus of at least one book- La Palmita: Muerte sobre las lomas by Armando Leal. Descendants from the village have settled in Edinburg, Texas. Their surnames include Salinas, Ramos, Regalado, Pulido, Garza, Leal, among others.
