= James Coleman (politician) =

American politician from Colorado

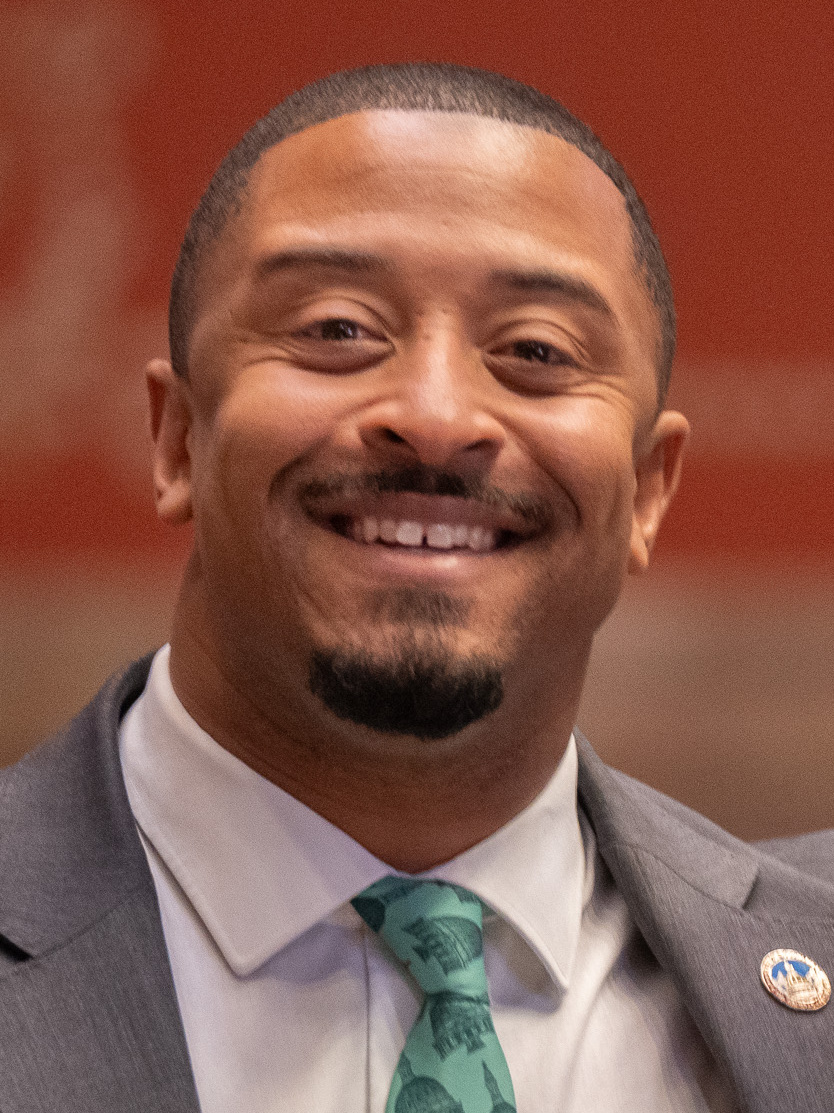

President of the Colorado Senate
- Incumbent
- Assumed office January 8, 2025
- Preceded by: Steve Fenberg

President pro tempore of the Colorado Senate
- In office January 9, 2023 – January 8, 2025
- Preceded by: Kerry Donovan
- Succeeded by: Dafna Michaelson Jenet

Member of the Colorado Senate from the 33rd district
- Incumbent
- Assumed office January 13, 2021
- Preceded by: Angela Williams

Member of the Colorado House of Representatives from the 7th district
- In office January 11, 2017 – January 13, 2021
- Preceded by: Angela Williams
- Succeeded by: Jennifer Bacon

Personal details
- Born: James Rashad Coleman Denver, Colorado, U.S.
- Party: Democratic
- Spouse: Shayna
- Children: 2
- Education: Oral Roberts University (BA)

James Rashad Coleman is an American politician, who is currently serving as a member of the Colorado Senate from the 33rd district. He is currently the President of the Colorado Senate. Prior to entering the State Senate, he was a member of the Colorado House of Representatives from the 7th district.

== Early life and education ==
He was born and raised in Park Hill, Denver. He earned a Bachelor of Arts degree in psychology with a minor in business administration from Oral Roberts University.

== Career ==
Coleman was elected to the Colorado House of Representatives in 2016. He won the Democratic primary with 41.37% of the vote against opponents Michele Wheeler and Elet Valentine and ran unopposed in the general election. During his tenure in the House, Coleman served on the Business Affairs & Labor Committee and the House Local Government Committee.

In 2019, Coleman announced his candidacy for the 33rd district seat in the Colorado Senate. Coleman ran unopposed in the Democratic primary and defeated Unionist Party nominee Jerry Burton in the November general election. He assumed office on January 13, 2021.

Coleman was elected to serve as President of the Colorado Senate for the 75th General Assembly, the second-ever African-American to hold the position.

== Personal life ==
Coleman lives in Denver's Green Valley Ranch neighborhood. He and his wife, Shayna, have two children.

Colorado Senate
Preceded by Kerry Donovan	President pro tempore of the Colorado Senate; 2023–2025	Succeeded by Dafna Michaelson Jenet
Political offices
Preceded by Steve Fenberg	President of the Colorado Senate; 2025–present	Incumbent
