= Larry Trujillo =

American politician

Larry Enoch Trujillo Sr.

Member of the Colorado Senate from the 3rd district
- In office January 14, 1987 – May 1, 1993
- Preceded by: John Beno
- Succeeded by: Bill Thiebaut

Member of the Colorado House of Representatives from the 43rd district
- In office January 5, 1983 – January 14, 1987
- Preceded by: George William Boley
- Succeeded by: Juan Trujillo

Personal details
- Born: August 9, 1940 Fort Garland, Colorado, U.S.
- Died: November 17, 2022 (aged 82) Pueblo, Colorado
- Party: Democratic
- Spouse: Elly
- Children: Two sons and two daughters
- Profession: Politician, public administrator

Larry Enoch Trujillo Sr. (August 9, 1940 – November 17, 2022) was a Democratic politician and public official from Colorado, U.S. He served in the Colorado Senate for about six years and four months, from January 1987 until his resignation in May 1993. Prior to serving in the Colorado Senate, he was a member of the Colorado House of Representatives for four years, from 1983 to 1987.

== Elections ==
Trujillo was first elected to the Colorado House of Representatives in 1982. He was re-elected in 1984 and served a total of four years in the state house. He ran for a seat in the Colorado Senate in 1986 and won, and he was re-elected in 1990. However, he didn't complete his second term in the senate, for he resigned on May 1, 1993, to take a job with the Colorado State Parole Board.

== Legislative leadership positions ==
In the Colorado House of Representatives, Trujillo served as the minority caucus leader in 1985 and the house minority Leader in 1986. During his term in the senate, Trujillo served as senate minority leader from 1989 to 1993.

== Legislative accomplishments ==
Trujillo's legislative efforts led to the creation of the San Carlos Correctional Facility in Pueblo and the Spanish Peaks Veterans Community Living Center at Walsenburg.

== Post-legislative work ==
Following his resignation from the Colorado Senate on May 1, 1993, Trujillo began serving on the Colorado State Parole Board, a position he held until 1997. Also, around this time, President Bill Clinton appointed him to chair the Arkansas River Compact. In 1997, he was appointed deputy executive director of the Colorado Department of Corrections. Later he served as executive director of the Colorado Department of Personnel and Administration under Governor Bill Owens. In 2001, President Bush appointed Trujillo administrator of Region 8 of the U.S. General Services Administration.

== Last years and death ==
In 2000, Trujillo changed his voter registration from Democrat to Republican. The governor at the time, Bill Owens, threw a surprise reception at the Governor's Mansion in Denver to mark Trujillo's change in party registration.

Trujillo died on November 17, 2022, in Pueblo.
