= Rollie Heath =

American politician (born 1937)

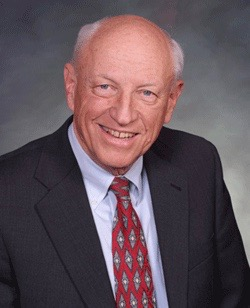

Majority Leader of the Colorado Senate
- In office October 9, 2013 – January 7, 2015
- Preceded by: Morgan Carroll
- Succeeded by: Mark Scheffel

Member of the Colorado Senate from the 18th district
- In office January 7, 2009 – January 11, 2017
- Preceded by: Ron Tupa
- Succeeded by: Steve Fenberg

Personal details
- Born: December 28, 1937 (age 88) Baltimore, Maryland, U.S.
- Party: Democratic
- Spouse: Josie Ward (m. 1961)
- Education: University of Wisconsin, Madison (BS, JD)
- Website: Official website

Stratton Rollins Heath Jr. (born December 28, 1937) is an American politician and former state legislator in the U.S. state of Colorado who previously served as the Colorado State Senate Assistant Minority Leader. Elected to the Colorado State Senate as a Democrat in 2008, Heath represented Senate District 18, which encompasses Boulder, Colorado and portions of Boulder County. Heath served as State Senate Majority Caucus Leader from October 2013 to 2014. Prior to winning elective office, Heath was the founding chairman of ProgressNow, a progressive advocacy organization. Term limited, he did not run for re-election in the 2016 elections, so his term ended in January 2017. Heath is a member of the Unitarian Universalist Church of Boulder.

== Political career ==
Heath was the Democratic nominee for governor in 2002. He lost to incumbent Republican governor Bill Owens.

== Legislative career ==
=== 2008 election ===
Heath faced University of Colorado Regent Cindy Carlisle in the August 12, 2008, 18th District Democratic primary, defeating her 56% to 44%.

Heath was unopposed in the November 2008 general election. Heath's candidacy was endorsed by the Denver Post and the Boulder Daily Camera.

=== Colorado General Assembly ===
For the 2009 session of the Colorado General Assembly, Heath was named to seats on the Senate Business, Labor, and Technology Committee, the Senate Education Committee, and the Senate Finance Committee.

In November 2008, Heath was named to a special legislative Committee on Job Creation and Economic Growth, tasked with developing recommendations on bolstering Colorado's economy before the 2009 legislative session. Heath has sponsored legislation to re-instate the Colorado Credit Reserve program to assist small businesses in obtaining loans, and in 2008 announced plans to sponsor legislation to provide matching funds to startup companies in the "clean energy" field.

On October 9, 2013, Heath was elected as Majority Leader of the Colorado State Senate after the preceding Majority Leader Morgan Carroll was elected to replace recalled Colorado State Senator John Morse as president of the Colorado Senate.

Party political offices
Preceded by Gail Schoettler	Democratic nominee for Governor of Colorado; 2002	Succeeded by Bill Ritter
