= Dafna Michaelson Jenet =

American politician

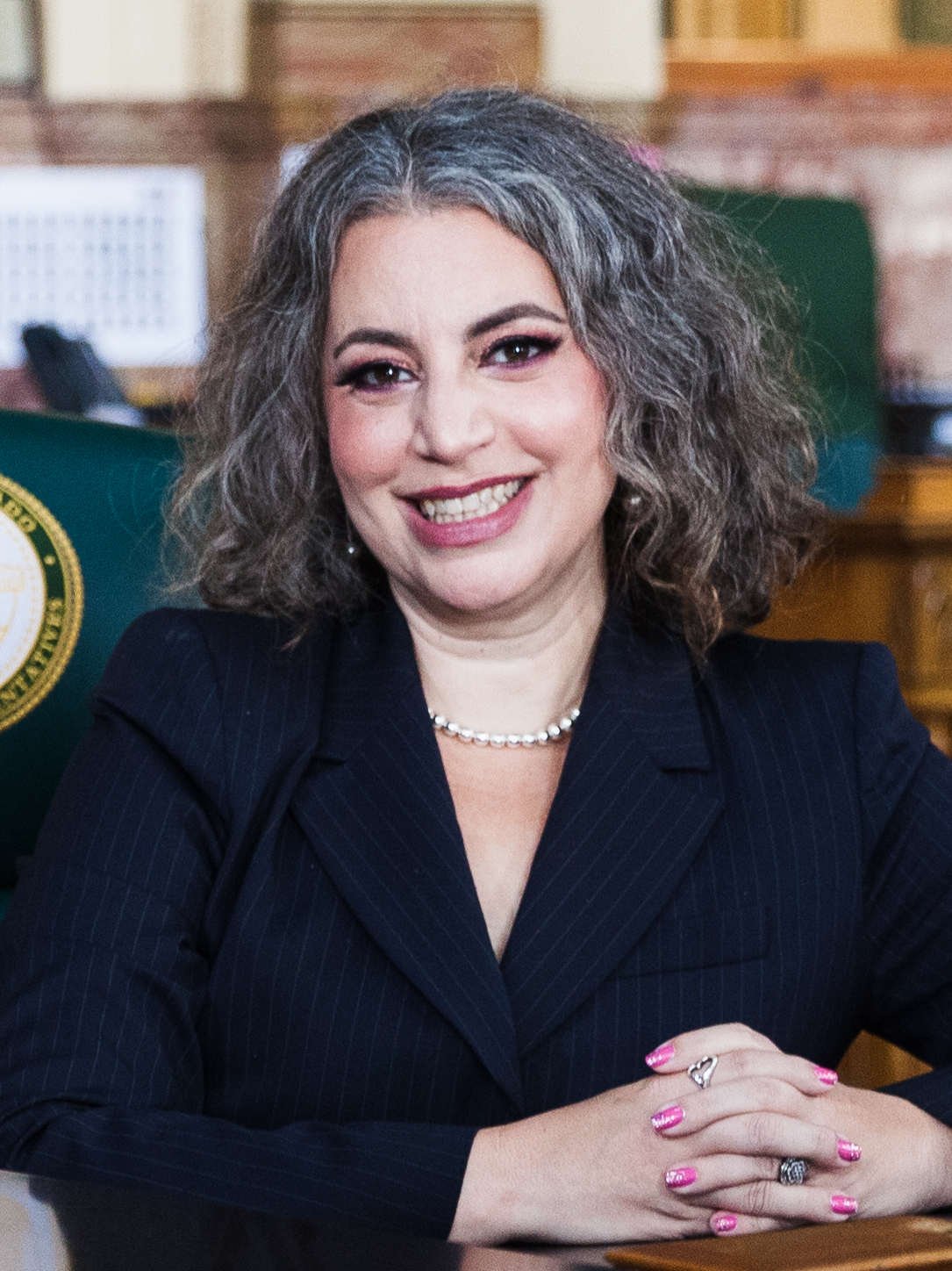

President pro tempore of the Colorado Senate
- In office January 8, 2025 – February 13, 2026
- Preceded by: James Coleman
- Succeeded by: Cathy Kipp

Member of the Colorado Senate from the 21st district
- In office September 19, 2023 – February 13, 2026
- Preceded by: Dominick Moreno
- Succeeded by: Adrienne Benavidez

Member of the Colorado House of Representatives
- In office January 11, 2017 – September 19, 2023
- Preceded by: JoAnn Windholz
- Succeeded by: Manny Rutinel
- Constituency: 30th district (2017–2023); 32nd district (2023)

Personal details
- Born: November 14, 1972 (age 53) Tel Aviv, Israel
- Party: Democratic
- Spouse: Michael Jenet
- Relatives: Yehiel Mark Kalish (brother)
- Education: Yeshiva University (BA); University of Denver (MBA)
- Website: Campaign website

Dafna Michaelson Jenet (born November 14, 1972) is an American politician who served as a Democratic member of the Colorado House of Representatives from January, 2017 to September, 2023, and the Colorado Senate as President Pro Tempore, representing District 21 from her appointment in September of 2023 to her resignation in February of 2026.

Michaelson Jenet is most well known for creating the I Matter program in 2021 through House Bill 21-1258, a program which provides six free sessions of therapy to any school aged kid in Colorado in English and in Spanish without requiring insurance. She made the program permanent in 2024 with Senate Bill 24-001.

Michaelson Jenet and her husband Michael Jenet founded the nonprofit Journey Institute. She is the sister of Yehiel Mark Kalish, the only rabbi to serve in the Illinois House of Representatives.

She published her first book, It Takes a Little Crazy to Make a Difference, in 2015. The book, which describes her yearlong tour of all 50 states in 2009, won the 2015 International Book Award in the social change category. She published her second book, Peanut's Legacy, in 2017. In it, she describes the loss of her final pregnancy.

Michaelson Jenet serves as Chair of House Public and Behavioral Healthcare and Human Services Committee. She also serves on the Legislative Audit Committee and on the House Education Committee,2 and was chair of the Interim School Safety Committee in 2019. In 2018, Michaelson Jenet was elected caucus chair by her peers in the General Assembly. In 2025, she was elected Senate President Pro Tempore by her peers.

In August 2023, she was selected by a vacancy committee to represent District 21 in the Colorado Senate, succeeding Dominick Moreno.

== Elections ==
=== 2016 ===
Michaelson Jenet was elected to the Colorado House of Representatives in 2016, defeating Republican incumbent JoAnn Windholz by a margin of 8 points. In her first campaign for public office, Michaelson Jenet was one of 161 candidates across the country endorsed by President Obama. Her 2016 campaign was targeted by the Democratic Legislative Campaign Committee as one of 52 “essential races” around the country.

=== 2018 ===
Michaelson Jenet was re-elected to the Colorado House of Representatives in 2018 and once again endorsed by President Obama. Her 2018 campaign was designated as a "race to watch" by the Democratic Legislative Campaign Committee as one of the critical 2018 midterm races in battleground states.

== Colorado State Legislature ==
=== 2017 legislative session ===
In the 2017 legislative session, Michaelson Jenet worked on issues of veterans affairs, mental health, and housing. She introduced a bill to create a statewide metric for Colorado's institutions of higher education to award college credit to veterans based on the skills and education they received while serving their country. The bill was chosen by House Speaker Crisanta Duran as one of the first five to be introduced in the session. The bill passed and was signed by Governor John Hickenlooper on June 1, 2017.

=== 2018 legislative session ===
In the 2018 Legislative Session, Michaelson Jenet sponsored HB18-1245 which eliminated the practice of conversion therapy on minors. Continuing her work in the mental health space she created the Office of the Behavioral Healthcare Ombudsman One of her other major accomplishments was HB18-1177 which lowered the age of consent for minors from 15 to 12 for Behavioral Healthcare services.

=== 2019 legislative session ===
In the 2019 Legislative Session, Michaelson Jenet passed the "Expand Child Nutrition School Lunch Protection Act". Begun in the Senate in 2018, this Act expanded the benefits of free lunch to students who qualified for reduced price lunch from 6th through 12th grade. Following a horrific case of abuse that the 17th Judicial District DA Dave Young called out to the Legislature for support in tightening the laws she passed HB19-1155 which included updates to the definition of "sexual contact".

=== 2019 interim session ===
Following another school shooting in Colorado a renewed School Safety Committee was formed and Michaelson Jenet served as Chair. This bipartisan committee moved forward 5 pieces of legislation for the 2020 Legislative Session to consider.

In March 2020, during the COVID-19 pandemic in the United States, Michaelson Jenet tested positive for COVID-19. Michaelson Jenet was notified by her doctor that he mis-read the results of the test and she instead tested positive for Coronavirus NL63.

=== 2020 legislative session ===
During the 2020 session Rep. Michaelson Jenet continued her focus on Behavioral health and Education. She passed bill HB20-1411: COVID-19 Funds Allocation for Behavioral Health, which set aside funding for receiving mental health services during the COVID-19 pandemic. She also passed HB20-1336: Holocaust and Genocide Studies in Public Schools which put an emphasis on remembering history especially as the survivors with firsthand accounts pass on.

=== 2021 legislative session ===
In the 2021 legislative session, Michaelson Jenet continued to advocate for mental health legislation. Notably, she sponsored the “Insurance Coverage Mental Health Wellness Exam Act,” which allowed all Coloradans to access an annual mental health examination covered by insurance. Additionally, Michaelson Jenet also supported “Rapid Mental Health Response For Colorado Youth,” which provided three free therapy sessions to youth in Colorado which led to the creation of the “I Matter” program.

Colorado Senate
Preceded by James Coleman	President pro tempore of the Colorado Senate; 2025–2026	Succeeded by Cathy Kipp
