= Colorado's 21st Senate district =

American legislative district

Colorado's 21st State Senate district
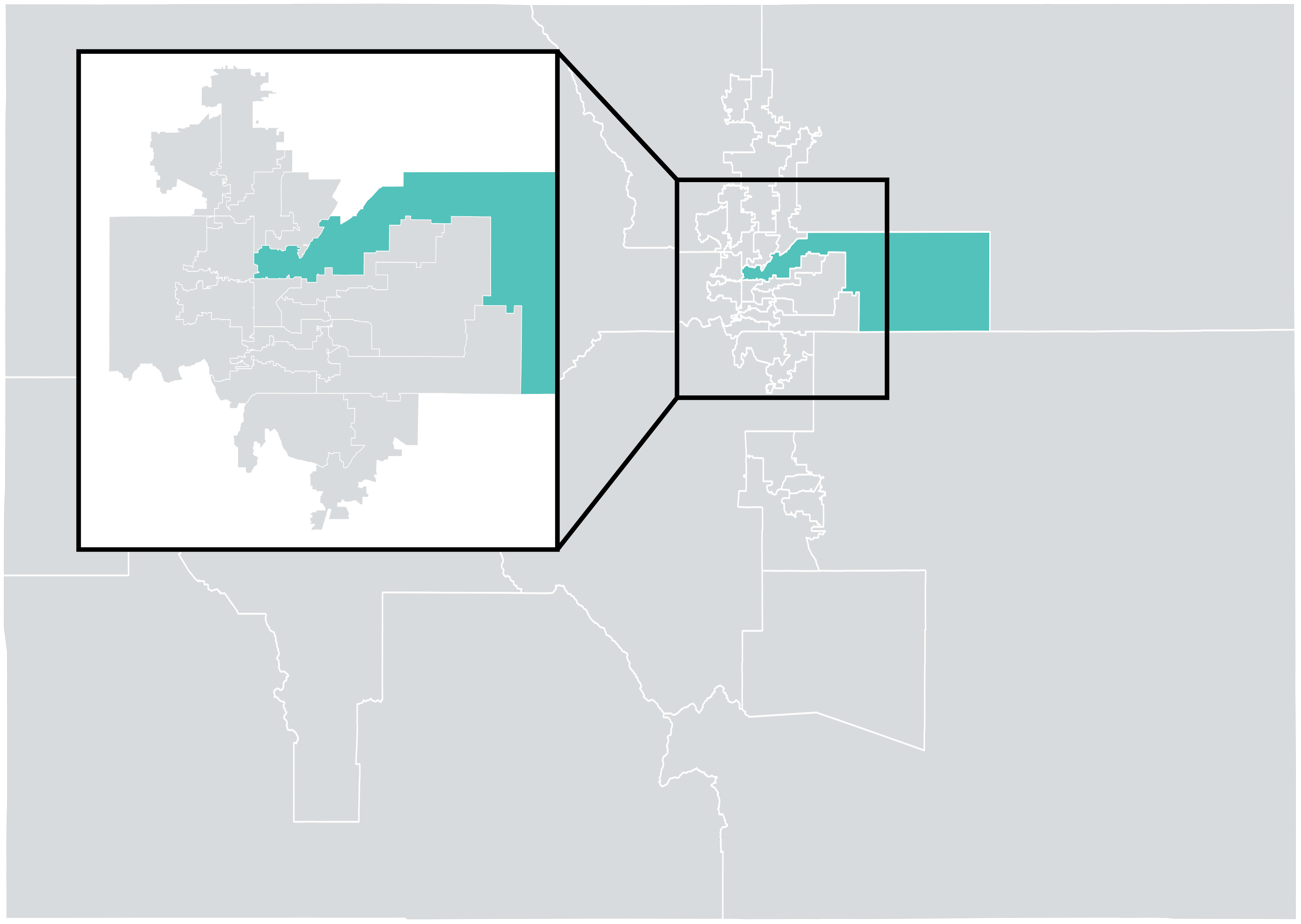
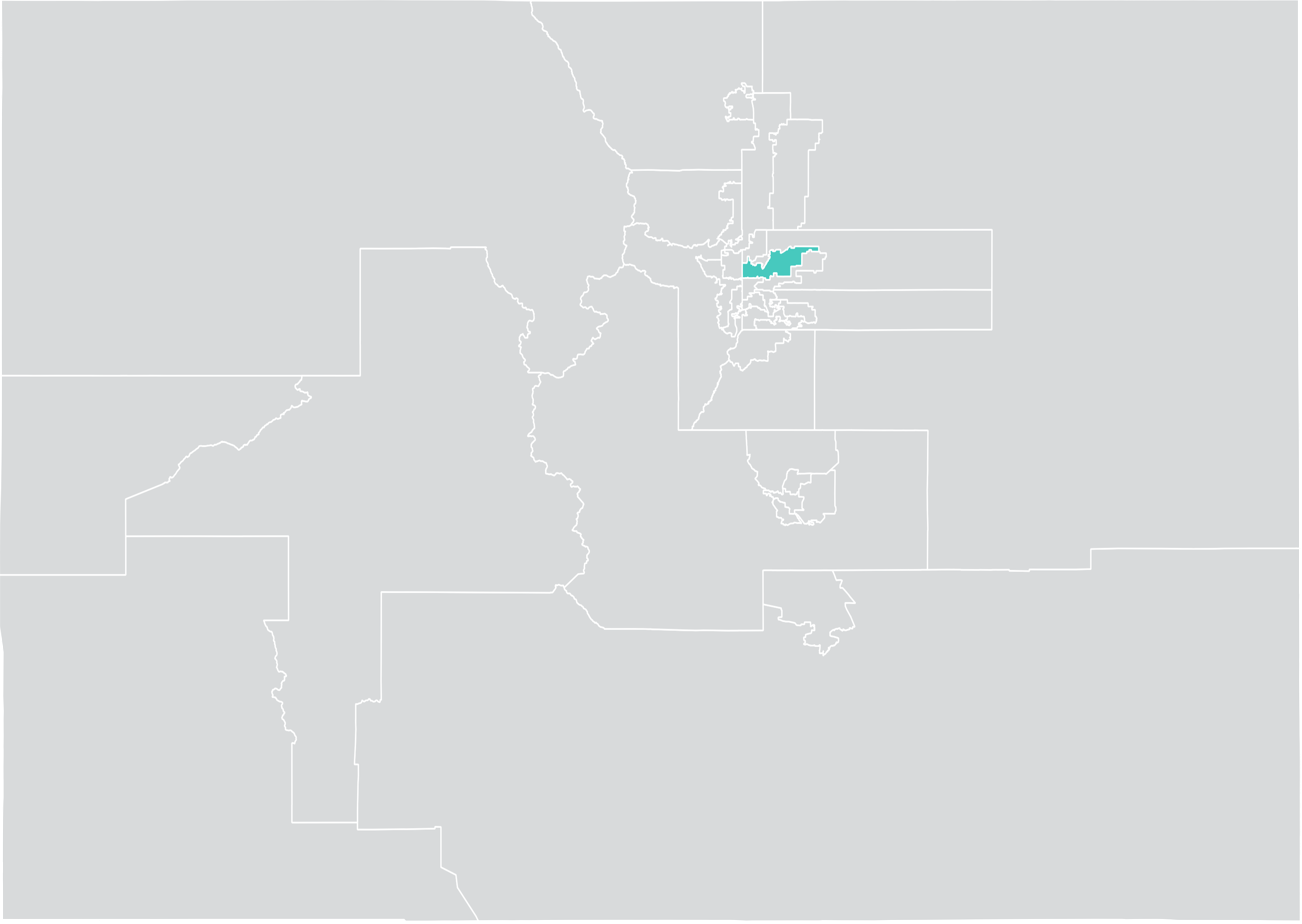
Senator
Adrienne Benavidez; D–Commerce City
- Registration: 28.7% Democratic; 18.5% Republican; 49.8% No party preference
- Demographics: 39% White; 3% Black; 53% Hispanic; 3% Asian; 2% Other
- Population (2018): 164,130
- Registered voters: 90,324

Colorado's 21st Senate district is one of 35 districts in the Colorado Senate. It is represented by represented by Democrat Adrienne Benavidez who was selected by a vacancy committee in February 2026 to succeed Democrat Dafna Michaelson Jenet.

== Geography ==
District 21 covers the immediate northern suburbs of Denver in Adams County, including Commerce City, Federal Heights, Berkley, Derby, Sherrelwood, Twin Lakes, Welby, parts of Shaw Heights and Westminster, and the eastern tip of Arvada.

The district is located entirely within Colorado's 7th congressional district, and overlaps with the 30th, 31st, 32nd, 34th, and 35th districts of the Colorado House of Representatives.

== Recent election results ==
Colorado state senators are elected to staggered four-year terms; under normal circumstances, the 21st district holds elections in presidential years.

=== 2020 ===
2020 Colorado State Senate election, District 21
Party	Candidate	Votes	%
Democratic	Dominick Moreno (incumbent)	41,438	63.5
Republican	Martin Mendez	23,769	36.5
Total votes		65,207	100
Democratic hold			

=== 2016 ===
2016 Colorado State Senate election, District 21
Party	Candidate	Votes	%
Democratic	Dominick Moreno	38,428	100
Total votes		38,428	100
Democratic hold			

=== 2012 ===
2012 Colorado State Senate election, District 21
Party	Candidate	Votes	%
Democratic	Jessie Ulibarri	30,308	64.9
Republican	Francine Bigelow	16,373	35.1
Total votes		46,681	100
Democratic hold			

=== Federal and statewide results ===
Year	Office	Results
2020	President	Biden 62.2 – 34.8%
2018	Governor	Polis 60.5 – 33.9%
2016	President	Clinton 56.0 – 35.3%
2014	Senate	Udall 54.1 – 37.5%
2014	Governor	Hickenlooper 56.0 – 37.6%
2012	President	Obama 64.5 – 32.7%
