= Jeannie Reeser =

American politician (born 1943)

Jeannie G. Reeser (born November 18, 1943) is a former American politician. She was a member of the Colorado state legislature for 14 years, the number of years set as the term limit by Colorado law. Her term ended in 1998. She was a Democrat.

Reeser is the former chief deputy treasurer of Adams County. After her service in the legislature ended, Governor Bill Owens appointed her to serve on the State Board for Community Colleges and Occupational Education.
