= Regis Groff =

American politician (1935–2014)

Regis Frank Groff

Member of the Colorado Senate from the 33rd district
- In office 1974–1994

Personal details
- Born: April 8, 1935 Monmouth, Illinois
- Died: October 5, 2014 (aged 79)
- Party: Democratic
- Education: Western Illinois University; University of Denver
- Occupation: Teacher

Regis F. Groff (April 8, 1935 – October 5, 2014) was an American school teacher, politician, and civil servant. The second African-American elected to the Colorado State Senate, Groff served for 20 years in it. Noted for his public speaking ability, he was called the "Conscience of the Colorado Senate." He was a Democrat.

== Biography ==
=== Early years ===
Regis F. Groff was born in Monmouth, Illinois on April 8, 1935. Groff served a stint in the United States Air Force from 1953 to 1957 as part of the Northeast Air Command.

Groff graduated from Western Illinois University in 1962. Following graduation Groff worked for one year in the city of Chicago as a case worker for the Cook County Department of Public Aid.

Groff moved to Denver, Colorado in 1963 to take a position teaching history at Smiley Junior High School. In 1967 he moved over to East High School, where he taught history and government. While a teacher at East High, Groff enrolled at the University of Denver, from which he received a Master's degree in Education in 1972.

=== Political career ===
Groff's initial stint in the Colorado State Senate in 1974 came via a special election held to fill two remaining years of a term for a seat vacated by Lieutenant Governor George L. Brown, the first African-American to have been elected to that body. Groff thereby became the second black elected to that body. Groff was re-elected to a full term in 1976 and returned to the statehouse at each election up to his departure from the Colorado Senate.

In 1976 Groff was selected by his Democratic peers as Assistant Minority Leader in the Colorado Senate. He was chosen by the Democratic caucus as Senate Minority Leader in the sessions held in 1978 and 1980.

During his time in the Colorado Senate Groff was instrumental in winning passage of legislation making the federal Martin Luther King Jr. Day into an official state holiday. He also worked actively in efforts to force the state to divest from investments in companies dealing with the Republic of South Africa, then ruled by a white minority government on the basis of racial apartheid. Groff traveled to South Africa, China, and a number of other countries in Europe and Africa on fact-finding missions and advancing the economic business of the state.

In 1986 Groff unsuccessfully ran for statewide office in an effort to become Lieutenant Governor of Colorado.

=== Later years ===
Groff resigned his seat the Colorado Senate in the first half of 1994 when Governor Roy Romer named him as the state's first director of the Youthful Offender System in Denver. He was succeeded by Gloria Tanner, whose appointment made her the first African American woman to serve as a Colorado state senator. Shortly thereafter, Groff resigned his position as the president of the National Black Caucus of State Legislators, a position he had held for four years.

Groff retired from state service in 1998, moving to the position of Executive Director of the Metro Black Church Initiative, a religious community service organization.

=== Death and legacy ===
Regis Groff died on October 5, 2014, of lung cancer. He was 79 years old at the time of his death.

Groff was remembered by Denver Mayor Michael B. Hancock as a "truly great leader" who was in turns "a friend, a mentor, and an adviser" who reminded him of the need of elected officials "to stay focused on the community, to always put the needs of the people before politics."

Groff's papers are housed by the Denver Public Library in Denver, Colorado. The collection consists of 8 archival boxes and five other containers of material, of which all save one are open for public research. The single restricted box remains closed until 2030.

Groff's son, Peter Groff, later served in the same district as a member of the Colorado State Senate. His daughter, Traci L. (Groff) Jones, is a published and nationally awarded Young Adult Author of four published books. He also has a campus named after him in northeast Denver, Colorado. The Regis F. Groff campus is currently a shared high school campus which houses KIPP High School and Rocky Mountain Prep RISE High School.

== Works ==
- Dan Price (moderator), School Desegregation: A Black Perspective. With Rachel Noel. Racine, WI: Johnson Foundation, 1976. —Audio cassette.
- Afro-American Health issues in the 1990s: Interviews with Participants at the 14th Annual Meeting of the National Black Caucus of State Legislators, St. Thomas, Virgin Islands. (Contributor.) Washington, DC: National Black Caucus of State Legislators, n.d. [c. 1990]. —Audio cassette.
