= Colorado's 18th Senate district =

American legislative district

Colorado's 18th State Senate district
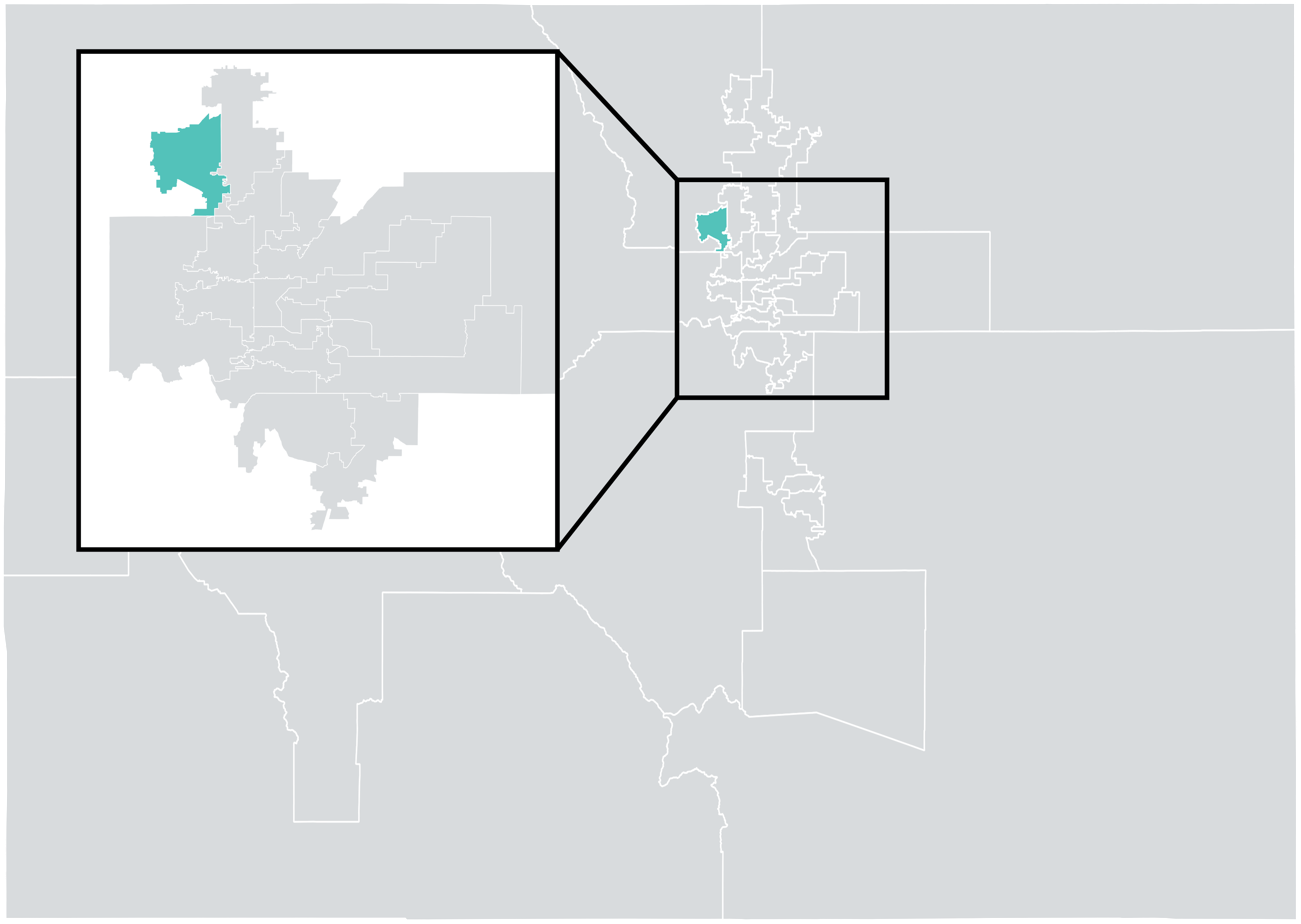
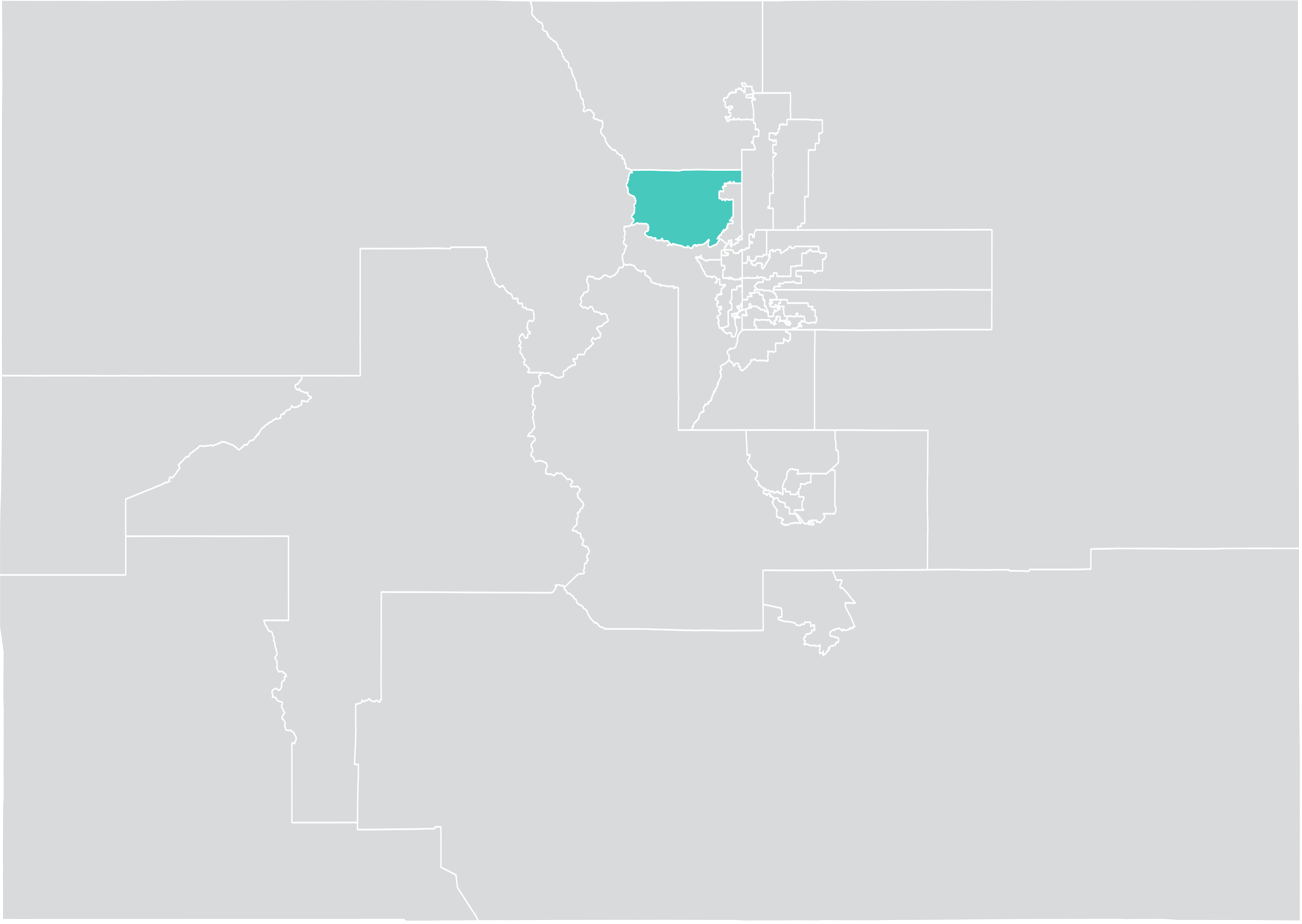
Senator
Judy Amabile; D–Boulder
- Registration: 44.4% Democratic; 7.2% Republican; 46.7% No party preference
- Demographics: 83% White; 1% Black; 9% Hispanic; 4% Asian; 3% Other
- Population (2018): 151,796
- Registered voters: 119,505

Colorado's 18th Senate district is one of 35 districts in the Colorado Senate. As of January 8, 2025 it is represented by Judy Amabile. It was previously represented by Democrat Steve Fenberg, the former Senate President, since 2017.

== Geography ==
District 18 is based in the city of Boulder, also covering the outlying Boulder County communities of Lyons, Nederland, Gunbarrel, and Niwot.

The district is located almost entirely within Colorado's 2nd congressional district, with a small section extending into the 4th district. It overlaps with the 10th, 11th, 12th, and 13th districts of the Colorado House of Representatives.

== Recent election results ==
Colorado state senators are elected to staggered four-year terms; under normal circumstances, the 18th district holds elections in presidential years.

=== 2020 ===
2020 Colorado State Senate election, District 18
Party	Candidate	Votes	%
Democratic	Steve Fenberg (incumbent)	75,261	82.9
Republican	Peg Cage	15,524	17.1
Total votes		90,785	100
Democratic hold			

=== 2016 ===
2016 Colorado State Senate election, District 18
Party	Candidate	Votes	%
Democratic	Steve Fenberg	67,799	79.6
Republican	M. Peter Spraitz	17,370	20.4
Total votes		85,169	100
Democratic hold			

=== 2012 ===
2012 Colorado State Senate election, District 18
Party	Candidate	Votes	%
Democratic	Rollie Heath (incumbent)	66,619	78.3
Republican	Barry Thoma	18,427	21.7
Total votes		85,046	100
Democratic hold			

=== Federal and statewide results ===
Year	Office	Results
2020	President	Biden 83.6 – 14.4%
2018	Governor	Polis 82.7 – 15.2%
2016	President	Clinton 78.1 – 15.2%
2014	Senate	Udall 77.5 – 19.4%
2014	Governor	Hickenlooper 75.6 – 18.1%
2012	President	Obama 76.5 – 21.0%
