= 2018 Colorado State Treasurer election =

- November 6, 2018
- Registered: 3,953,613
- Turnout: 64.92%
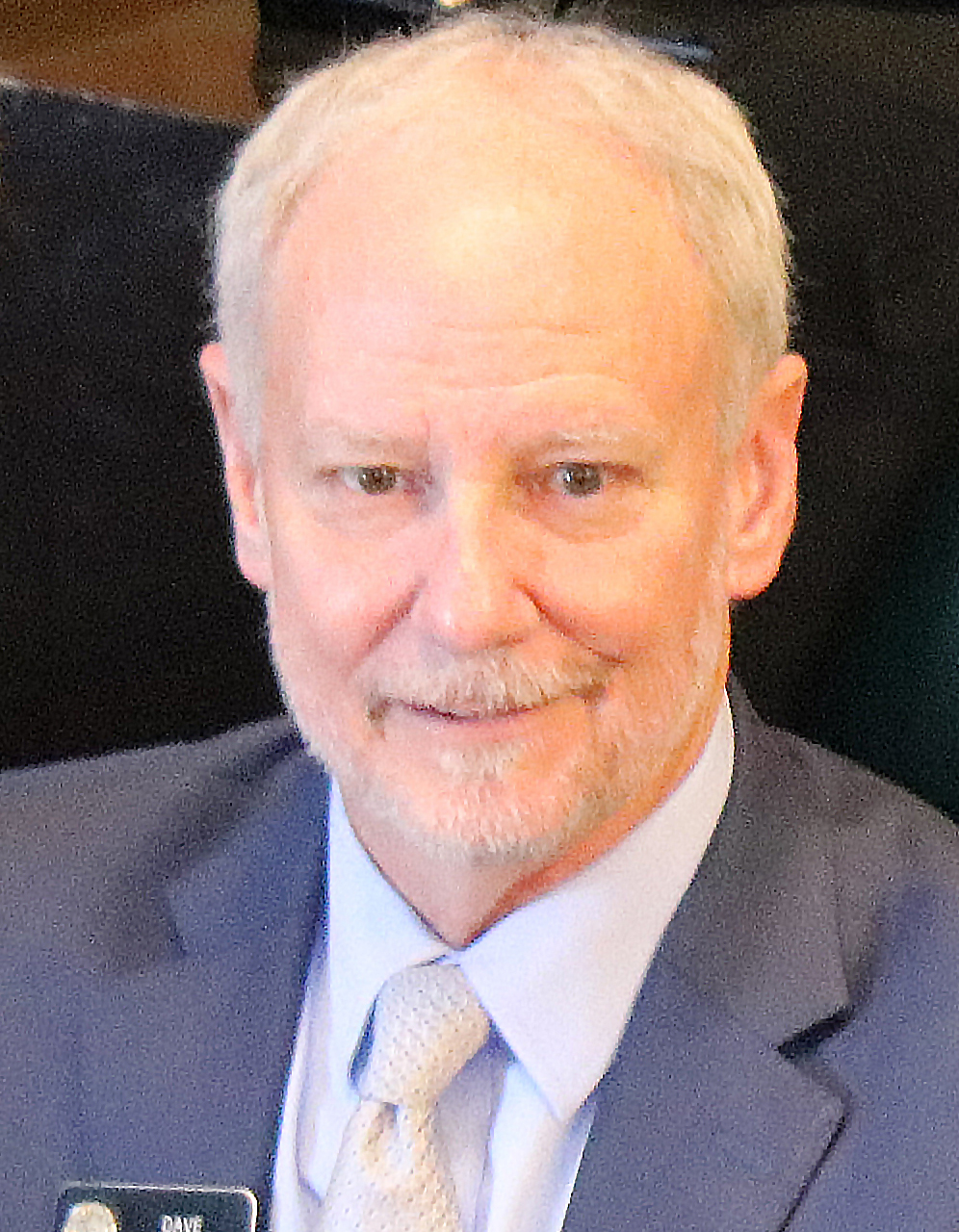

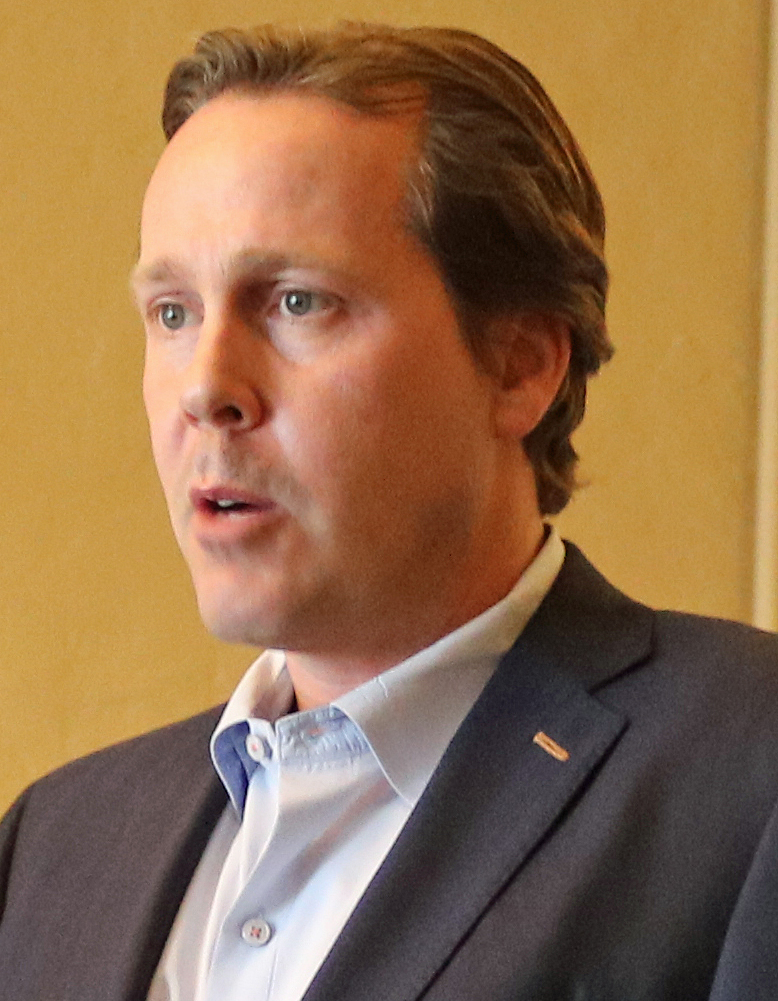
Candidate	Dave Young	Brian Watson
Party	Democratic	Republican
Popular vote	1,292,281	1,111,641
Percentage	52.23%	44.93%
- County results Young: 40–50% 50–60% 60–70% 70–80% Watson: 40–50% 50–60% 60–70% 70–80% 80–90%
State Treasurer before election
Walker Stapleton
Republican
Elected State Treasurer
Dave Young
Democratic

The 2018 Colorado State Treasurer election was held on November 6, 2018, to elect the Colorado State Treasurer, concurrently with elections to the United States House of Representatives, governor, and other state and local elections. Primary elections were held on June 26, 2018. A debate was held by KOAA-TV on October 13, 2018.

Incumbent Republican treasurer Walker Stapleton was term-limited and instead was the unsuccessful Republican nominee for governor. Democratic state representative Dave Young defeated Republican entrepreneur Brian Watson in the general election.

== Republican primary ==
A convention was held on April 14, 2018, to select primary candidates for the ballot. Justin Everett was selected at the convention, and Brian Watson and Polly Lawrence qualified via petitions. Three candidates were eliminated via a floor vote.

=== Candidates ===
==== Nominee ====
- Brian Watson, entrepreneur and CEO of Northstar Commercial Partners

==== Eliminated in primary ====
- Justin Everett, state representative from the 22nd district (2013-present)
- Polly Lawrence, state representative from the 39th district (2013-present)

==== Eliminated at convention ====
- Brett Barkey, district attorney
- Brita Horn, treasurer of Routt County
- Kevin Lundberg, state senator from the 15th district (2009-present)

=== Endorsements ===
Brian Watson

Newspapers and other media

- Greeley Tribune
Justin Everett

U.S. representatives

- Ken Buck, U.S. representative from Colorado's 4th congressional district (2015-present) and district attorney of Weld County (2004-2014)

State representatives

- Patrick Neville, minority leader of the Colorado House of Representatives (2017-present) and state representative from the 45th district (2015-present)

=== Results ===
Republican primary results
Party	Candidate	Votes	%
Republican	Brian Watson	171,823	37.97%
Republican	Justin Everett	167,045	36.91%
Republican	Polly Lawrence	113,673	25.12%
Total votes		452,541	100.00%

== Democratic primary ==
=== Candidates ===
==== Nominee ====
- Dave Young, state representative from the 50th district (2011-present)

==== Eliminated in primary ====
- Bernard Douthit, finance executive

==== Eliminated at convention ====
- Charles Scheibe, chief financial officer of the Colorado Department of the Treasury

==== Disqualified ====
- Steve Lebsock, state representative from the 34th district (2013-2018) (became a Republican)

=== Endorsements ===
Dave Young

Executive branch officials

- Betsy Markey, U.S. Assistant Secretary of Homeland Security for Governmental Affairs (2011-2013) and U.S. representative from Colorado's 4th congressional district (2009-2011)
- Ken Salazar, former United States Secretary of the Interior (2009-2013), U.S. Senator from Colorado (2005-2009), and Colorado Attorney General (1999-2005)

Statewide officials

- Gail Schoettler, former Lieutenant Governor of Colorado (1995-1999) and Colorado State Treasurer (1987-1995)

U.S. representatives

- Ed Perlmutter, U.S. representative from Colorado's 7th congressional district (2007-present)

State senators

- Steve Fenberg, state senator from the 18th district (2017-present)
- Lucía Guzmán, minority leader of the Colorado Senate (2015-present) and state senator from the 34th district (2010-present)
- Rollie Heath, majority leader of the Colorado Senate (2013-2015) and state senator from the 18th district (2009-2017)
- Daniel Kagan, state senator from the 26th district (2017-present) and state representative from the 3rd district (2009-2017)
- John Kefalas, state senator from the 14th district (2013-present) and state representative from the 52nd district (2007-2012)
- Andy Kerr, state senator from the 22nd district (2013-present) and state representative from the 26th district (2006-2013)
- Dominick Moreno, state senator from the 21st district (2017-present) and state representative from the 32nd district (2013-2017)
- Jeanne Nicholson, state senator from the 16th district (2011-2015)
- Pat Steadman, state senator from the 31st district (2009-2017)
- Gloria Tanner, state senator from the 33rd district (1994-2000) and state representative (1985-1994)
- Nancy Todd, state senator from the 28th district (2013-present) and state representative from the 41st district (2005-2013)
- Angela Williams, state senator from the 33rd district (2017-present) and state representative from the 7th district (2011-2017)

State representatives
- Jennifer Arndt, state representative from the 53rd district (2015-present)
- KC Becker, majority leader of the Colorado House of Representatives (2017-present) and state representative from the 13th district (2013-present)
- Adrienne Benavidez, state representative from the 32nd district (2017-present)
- Janet Buckner, state representative from the 40th district (2015-present)
- James Coleman, state representative from the 7th district (2017-present)
- Jessie Danielson, state representative from the 24th district (2015-present)
- Crisanta Duran, speaker of the Colorado House of Representatives (2017-present), majority leader of the Colorado House of Representatives (2015-2017), and state representative from the 5th district (2011-2019)
- Daneya Esgar, state representative from the 46th district (2015-present)
- Mark Ferrandino, speaker of the Colorado House of Representatives (2013-2015), minority leader of the Colorado House of Representatives (2011-2013), and state representative from the 2nd district (2007-2015)
- Mike Foote, state representative from the 12th district (2013-present)
- Alec Garnett, state representative from the 2nd district (2015-present)
- Joann Ginal, state representative from the 52nd district (2013-present)
- Millie Hamner, state representative from the 61st district (2010-present)
- Chris Hansen, state representative from the 6th district (2017-present)
- Edie Hooton, state representative from the 10th district (2017-present)
- Dominique Jackson, state representative from the 42nd district (2017-present)
- Chris Kennedy, state representative from the 23rd district (2017-present)
- Pete Lee, state representative from the 18th district (2011-present)
- Susan Lontine, state representative from the 1st district (2015-present)
- Barbara McLachlan, state representative from the 59th district (2017-present)
- Dafna Michaelson Jenet, state representative from the 30th district (2017-present)
- Jovan Melton, state representative from the 41st district (2013-present)
- Sal Pace, state representative from the 46th district (2009-2012) and commissioner of Pueblo County
- Dan Pabon, state representative from the 4th district (2011-present)
- Brittany Pettersen, state representative from the 28th district (2013-present)
- Dylan Roberts, state representative from the 26th district (2017-present)
- Jonathan Singer, state representative from the 11th district (2011-present)
- Tracy Kraft-Tharp, state representative from the 29th district (2013-present)

Statewide officials

- Bill Ritter, former Governor of Colorado (2007-2011) and district attorney of Denver (1993-2005)

Local officials

- Josie Heath, former commissioner of Boulder County

Labor unions

- American Federation of Teachers
- American Postal Workers Union
- Colorado AFL-CIO
- Colorado Education Association
- Communications Workers of America
- Teamsters Local 455

Newspapers and other media

- Greeley Tribune

Organizations

- Colorado Foundation for Universal Healthcare
Bernard Douthit

Individuals

- Lisa Calderon, activist
- Candi CdeBaca, activist

Organizations

- Democratic Socialists of America

=== Results ===
Democratic primary results
Party	Candidate	Votes	%
Democratic	Dave Young	363,295	67.48%
Democratic	Bernard Douthit	175,116	32.52%
Total votes		538,411	100.00%

== General election ==
=== Post-primary endorsements ===
Brian Watson (R)

Newspapers and other media

- The Mountain Mail
Dave Young (D)

U.S. presidents

- Barack Obama, President of the United States (2009-2017) and U.S. Senator from Illinois (2005-2008)

Newspapers and other media

- Greeley Tribune
- The Denver Post
- Yellow Scene

Organizations

- Planned Parenthood Action Fund

=== Results ===
2018 Colorado State Treasurer election
Party	Candidate	Votes	%
Democratic	Dave Young	1,292,281	52.23%
Republican	Brian Watson	1,111,641	44.93%
Constitution	Gerald Kilpatrick	70,475	2.84%
Total votes		2,474,397	100.00%
Democratic gain from Republican			
