= 2018 Colorado elections =

A general election was held in the U.S. state of Colorado on November 6, 2018. All of Colorado's executive offices and all seven of its seats in the United States House of Representatives were up for election. Democrats swept every statewide election on the ballot, leaving the at-large seat on the University of Colorado Board of Regents and the Class 2 U.S. Senate seat as the last statewide offices held by Republicans.

== United States House of Representatives ==
All of Colorado's seven seats in the United States House of Representatives were up for election in 2018.

== Governor and lieutenant governor ==
Incumbent Democratic governor John Hickenlooper was term-limited. Incumbent Democratic lieutenant governor Donna Lynne ran for governor, but was eliminated in the Democratic primary on June 26, 2018.

=== Results ===
Colorado gubernatorial election, 2018
Party	Candidate	Votes	%
Democratic	Jared Polis	1,348,888	53.4
Republican	Walker Stapleton	1,080,801	42.8
Libertarian	Scott Helker	69,519	2.8
Unity	Bill Hammons	25,854	1.0
Total votes		2,525,062	100.0%
Democratic hold			

== Attorney general ==
Incumbent Republican attorney general Cynthia Coffman ran for governor, but was eliminated at the state Republican party convention in April.

=== Democratic primary ===
==== Declared ====
- Joe Salazar, state representative
- Phil Weiser, former dean of the University of Colorado Law School

==== Campaign suspended ====
- Michael Dougherty, district attorney for Colorado's Twentieth Judicial District
- Brad Levin, attorney
- Amy Padden, federal prosecutor

==== Endorsements ====
Michael Dougherty (withdrawn)
- Bruce Brown, district attorney for Colorado's 5th judicial district
- Mike Foote, state representative
Joe Salazar

Organizations

- 350.org
- Colorado AFL–CIO
- Colorado Black Women for Political Action
- Hardcore Democrats
- International Brotherhood of Electrical Workers Colorado
- Keep Colorado Green
- Never Again Colorado
- Our Revolution
- Progressive Democrats of America
- Vote Pro-Choice
- Working Families Party

National officials

- Bernie Sanders, U.S. senator and 2016 presidential candidate, Vermont

State officials

- Irene Aguilar, state senator
- Polly Baca, former state senator
- Adrienne Benavidez, state representative
- Celina Benavidez, former state representative
- James Coleman, state representative
- Mark Ferrandino, former speaker of the House
- Mike Foote, state representative and candidate for Boulder County DA
- Joann Ginal, state representative
- Lucia Guzman, minority leader of the Colorado Senate
- Leslie Herod, state representative
- Edie Hooton, state representative
- Jovan Melton, state representative
- Dominick Moreno, state senator
- Jonathan Singer, state representative
- Jessie Ulibarri, former state senator
- Faith Winter, state representative

Local officials

- Shannon Bird, Westminster city councilwoman
- Maria de Cambria, Westminster city councilwoman
- Brother Jeff Fard, Denver community leader
- Rochelle Galindo, Greeley councilwoman
- Alberto Garcia, Westminster city councilwoman
- Eva Henry, Adams County commissioner
- Paul Lopez, Denver city councilman
- Kathly Plomer, president of the Adams County Board of Education
- Rhonda Solis, member of Colorado Board of Education
- Chaz Tedesco, Adams County commissioner
Brad Levin
- Jean Dubofsky, former Colorado Supreme Court justice
Phil Weiser

State officials

- Bernie Buescher, former secretary of state and former Colorado deputy attorney general
- John Hickenlooper, governor of Colorado
- JD MacFarlane, former Colorado attorney general
- Bill Ritter, former governor of Colorado
- Roy Romer, former governor of Colorado
- Ken Salazar, former U.S. senator and former United States Secretary of the Interior
- Gail Schoettler, former Colorado lieutenant governor and state treasurer
- Tim Wirth, former United States senator from Colorado

Local officials

- Jeni James Arndt, state representative; Assistant Majority Caucus Chair, district 53 (Larimer County)
- Fiona Arnold, CEO of Mainspring Developers; former executive director of the Colorado Department of Economic Development; former chair of the Colorado Law Dean's Advisory Council
- Bruce Brown, district attorney for Colorado's 5th judicial district (Clear Creek, Eagle, Lake, & Summit counties)
- Kathy Chandler-Henry, Eagle County Commissioner
- Jeff Chostner, district attorney for Pueblo
- Dennis Flores, Pueblo City Councilman
- Stan Garnett, former Boulder County district attorney
- Irene Griego, University of Colorado regent
- Chris Hansen, state representative, district 6 (Denver County)
- Bill Holen, Arapahoe County Commissioner
- Nancy Jackson, Arapahoe County Commissioner #4
- Elise Jones, Boulder County Commissioner
- Tracy Kraft-Tharp, state representative, district 29 (Jefferson County)
- Alice Madden, former Majority Leader of the Colorado House of Representatives
- Dennis Maes, Pueblo County School Board member; former judge; practicing lawyer
- Jeanne McQueeney, Eagle County Commissioner
- Sean Murphy, mayor of Telluride, Colorado
- Anthony Nunez, former Pueblo County Commissioner
- Garrison Ortiz, Pueblo County Commissioner
- Sal Pace, Pueblo County Commissioner
- Joe Pelle, Boulder County Sheriff
- Marcelina Rivera, chief of staff to superintendent of Aurora Public Schools
- Gail Schwartz, former Colorado state senator
- David Skaggs, former Congressman Colorado's 2nd district
- Taylor Voss, Pueblo City School Board
- John Walsh, former United States Attorney for Colorado

Community and civic leaders

- Jessica Brown, partner, Gibson Dunn; former president, Colorado Women's Bar Association; former chair, Legal Aid Foundation of Colorado board of trustees
- Maxine Burkett, law professor
- Dan Caruso, founder, chairman, and CEO of Zayo; former chair of the Blackstone Entrepreneurs Network Steering Committee
- Aneesh Chopra, former Chief Technology Officer of the United States
- Audrey Danner, owner of Mountain Connect
- Brad Feld, co-founder of Foundry Group; co-founder of Mobius Venture Capital
- Franz Hardy, former chair of the CU Law Alumni Board; partner at Gordon & Rees
- Sue Heilbronner, CEO of Mergelane
- Amy Padden, federal prosecutor, former candidate for Colorado attorney general
- Paul Washington, former executive director of the Denver Office of Economic Development

==== Polling ====
Poll source	Date(s) administered	Sample size	Margin of error	Joe Salazar	Phil Weiser	Amy Padden	Brad Levin	Undecided
Magellan Strategies (R)	May 30–31, 2018	503	± 4.38%	27%	8%	–	–	65%
Magellan Strategies (R)	March 20–23, 2018	410	± 4.8%	34%	5%	5%	4%	51%

==== Results ====
Democratic primary results
Party	Candidate	Votes	%
Democratic	Phil Weiser	298,048	50.43
Democratic	Joe Salazar	292,912	49.57
Total votes		590,960	100.0

=== Republican primary ===
==== Declared ====
- George Brauchler, district attorney for Colorado's 18th Judicial District

==== Results ====
Republican primary results
Party	Candidate	Votes	%
Republican	George Brauchler	414,532	100.0
Total votes		414,532	100.0

=== General election ===
==== Endorsements ====
Phil Weiser (D)

Former U.S. executive branch officials

- Joe Biden, 47th vice president of the United States
- Barack Obama, 44th president of the United States

State officials

- Bernie Buescher, former secretary of state and former Colorado deputy attorney general
- John Hickenlooper, governor of Colorado
- JD MacFarlane, former Colorado attorney general
- Bill Ritter, former governor of Colorado
- Roy Romer, former governor of Colorado
- Ken Salazar, former U.S. senator and former United States Secretary of the Interior
- Gail Schoettler, former Colorado lieutenant governor and state treasurer
- Tim Wirth, former United States senator from Colorado

Local officials

- Jeni James Arndt, state representative; assistant majority caucus chair, District 53 (Larimer County)
- Fiona Arnold, CEO of Mainspring Developers; former executive director of the Colorado Department of Economic Development; former chair of the Colorado Law Dean's Advisory Council
- Bruce Brown, district attorney for Colorado's 5th judicial district (Clear Creek, Eagle, Lake, & Summit counties)
- Kathy Chandler-Henry, Eagle County Commissioner
- Jeff Chostner, district attorney for Pueblo
- Dennis Flores, Pueblo City Councilman
- Stan Garnett, former Boulder County district attorney
- Irene Griego, University of Colorado regent
- Chris Hansen, state representative, district 6 (Denver County)
- Bill Holen, Arapahoe County Commissioner
- Nancy Jackson, Arapahoe County Commissioner #4
- Elise Jones, Boulder County Commissioner
- Alice Madden, former Majority Leader of the Colorado House of Representatives
- Dennis Maes, Pueblo County School Board member; former judge; practicing lawyer
- Jeanne McQueeney, Eagle County Commissioner
- Sean Murphy, mayor of Telluride, Colorado
- Anthony Nunez, former Pueblo County Commissioner
- Garrison Ortiz, Pueblo County Commissioner
- Sal Pace, Pueblo County Commissioners
- Joe Pelle, Boulder County Sheriff
- Marcelina Rivera, chief of staff to superintendent of Aurora Public Schools
- Gail Schwartz, former Colorado state senator
- David Skaggs, former Congressman Colorado's 2nd district
- Tracy Kraft Tharp, state representative, district 29 (Jefferson County)
- Taylor Voss, Pueblo City School Board
- John Walsh, former United States Attorney for Colorado

Community and civic leaders

- Jessica Brown, partner, Gibson Dunn; former president, Colorado Women's Bar Association; former chair, Legal Aid Foundation of Colorado board of trustees
- Maxine Burkett, law professor
- Dan Caruso, founder, chairman, and CEO of Zayo; former chair of the Blackstone Entrepreneurs Network Steering Committee
- Aneesh Chopra, former Chief Technology Officer of the United States
- Audrey Danner, owner of Mountain Connect
- Brad Feld, co-founder of Foundry Group; co-founder of Mobius Venture Capital
- Franz Hardy, former chair of the CU Law Alumni Board; partner at Gordon & Rees
- Sue Heilbronner, CEO of Mergelane
- Amy Padden, federal prosecutor, former candidate for Colorado attorney general
- Paul Washington, former executive director of the Denver Office of Economic Development
George Brauchler (R)
- Bob Beauprez, former U.S. representative
- Jim Crone, Morgan County sheriff
- Michael McIntosh, Adams County sheriff
- Shawn Mobley, Otero County sheriff
- Brian Norton, Rio Grande County sheriff
- Steve Reams, Weld County sheriff
- Dan Rubinstein, 21st judicial district attorney
- Jeff Shrader, Jefferson County sheriff
- Justin Smith, Larimer County Sheriff
- James Van Beek, Eagle County sheriff
- Garrett Wiggins, Routt County sheriff
- Sam Zordel, Prowers County sheriff

Organizations

- Colorado Association of Realtors

Newspapers

- The Denver Post
- Durango Herald
- Fort Collins Coloradoan
- The Pueblo Chieftain

==== Polling ====
Poll source	Date(s) administered	Sample size	Margin of error	Phil Weiser (D)	George Brauchler (R)	Undecided
Democratic Attorneys General Association (D)	May 8–10, 2018	883	± 3.30%	47%	35%	18%

Hypothetical polling

Joe Salazar vs. George Brauchler

Poll source	Date(s) administered	Sample size	Margin of error	Joe Salazar (D)	George Brauchler (R)	Undecided
Democratic Attorneys General Association (D)	May 8–10, 2018	883	± 3.30%	51%	36%	13%

==== Results ====
Colorado Attorney General election, 2018
Party	Candidate	Votes	%
Democratic	Phil Weiser	1,285,464	51.6
Republican	George Brauchler	1,124,757	45.1
Libertarian	William "Bill" Robinson III	81,733	3.3
Total votes		2,491,954	100.0
Democratic gain from Republican			

== Secretary of State ==
Incumbent Republican secretary of state Wayne Williams was eligible to run for re-election to a second term.

=== Results ===
2018 Colorado Secretary of State election
Party	Candidate	Votes	%
Democratic	Jena Griswold	1,313,716	52.70%
Republican	Wayne Williams (incumbent)	1,113,927	44.69%
Constitution	Amanda Campbell	51,734	2.08%
Approval Voting	Blake Huber	13,258	0.53%
Total votes		2,492,635	100.00%
Democratic gain from Republican			

== State treasurer ==
2018 Colorado State Treasurer election
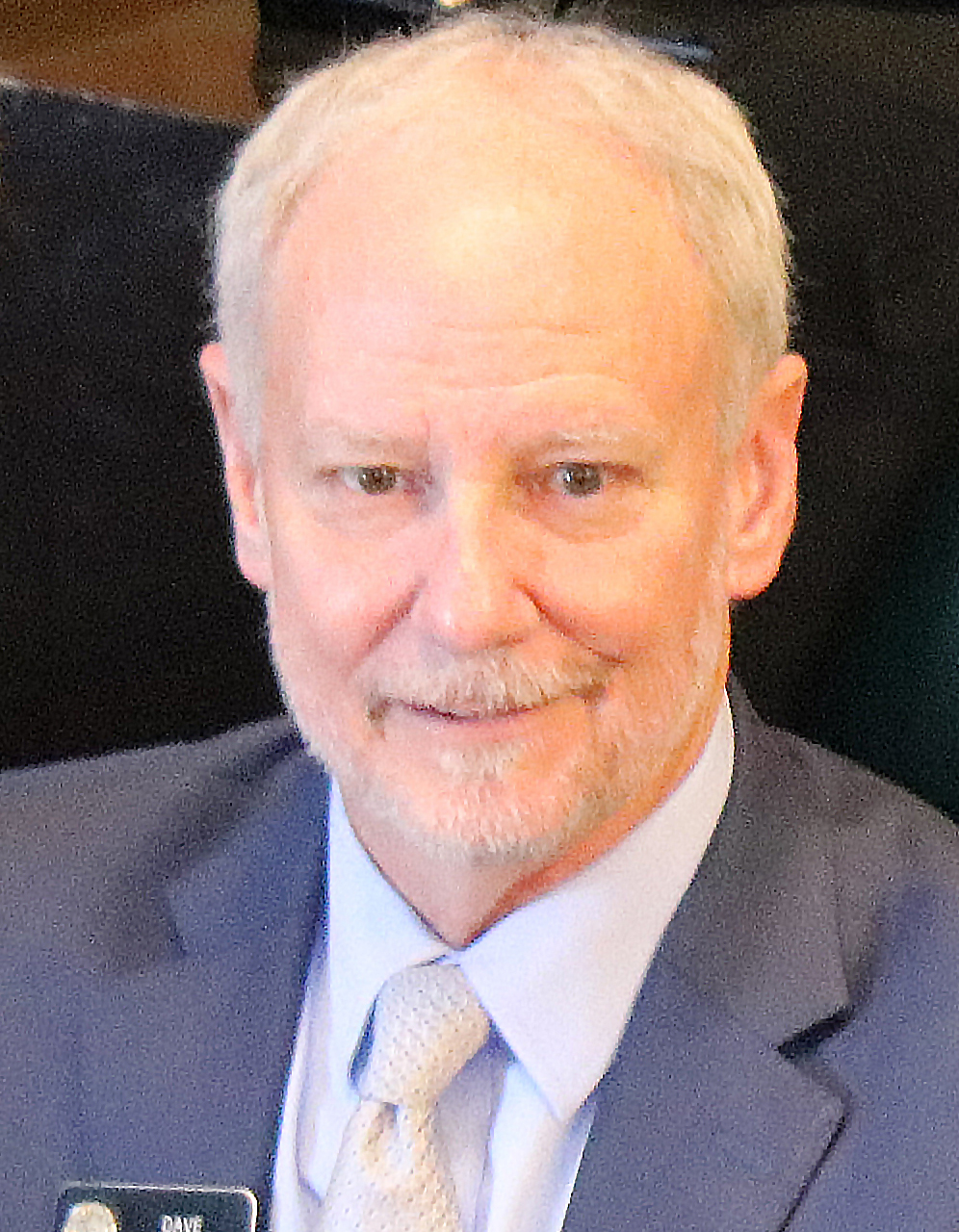

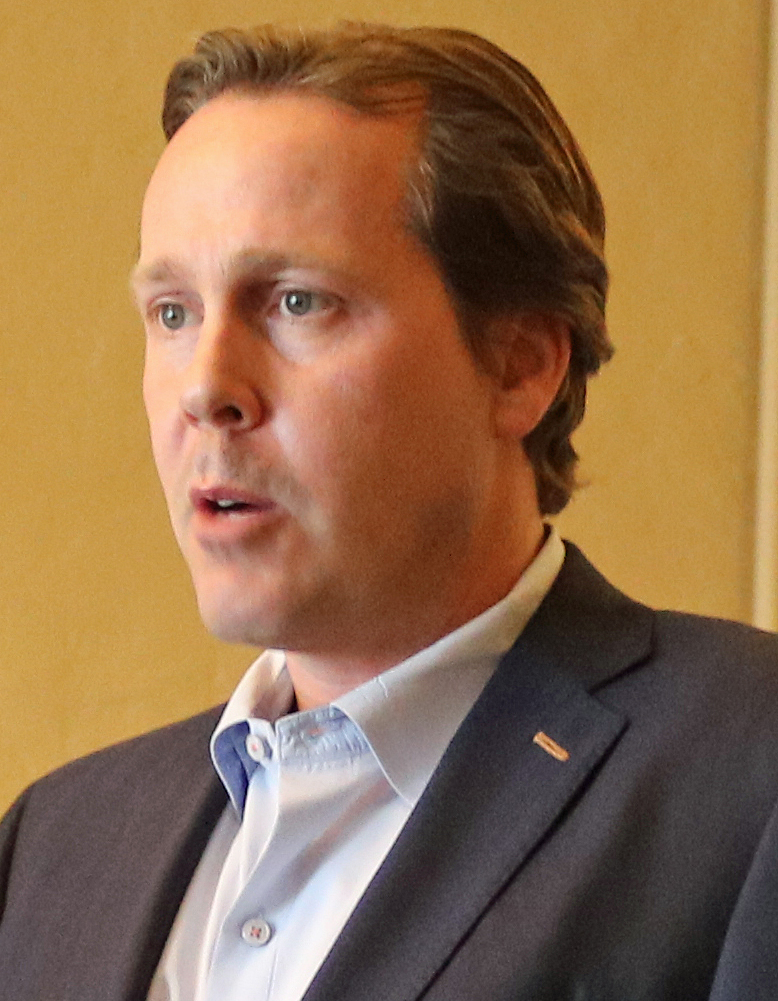
Nominee	Dave Young	Brian Watson
Party	Democratic	Republican
Popular vote	1,292,281	1,111,641
Percentage	52.2%	44.9%
- County results Young: 40–50% 50–60% 60–70% 70–80% Watson: 40–50% 50–60% 60–70% 70–80% 80–90%
State Treasurer before election
Walker Stapleton
Republican
Elected State Treasurer
Dave Young
Democratic

Incumbent Republican state treasurer Walker Stapleton was term-limited and could not run for a third consecutive term in office. He was the unsuccessful Republican nominee for governor of Colorado.

=== Democratic primary ===
==== Declared ====
- Bernard Douthit, businessman
- Dave Young, state representative

==== Eliminated at convention ====
- Charles Scheibe, chief financial officer of the Colorado Department of Treasury

==== Disqualified ====
- Steve Lebsock, state representative

==== Endorsements ====
Dave Young (D)

Organizations

- American Federation of Teachers Colorado
- American Postal Workers Union 229
- Colorado AFL–CIO
- Colorado Education Association
- Colorado Rural PAC/Rocky Mountain Farmers Union
- Communication Workers of America
- Never Again Colorado
- Pipefitters 208
- Support Jeffco Kids

Unions

- Teamsters Local 455

Newspapers

- The Greeley Tribune

State senators

- Steve Fenberg
- Mark Ferrandino, former speaker
- Rhonda Fields
- Lucia Guzman, minority leader
- Rollie Heath, former
- Matt Jones
- Daniel Kagan
- John Kefalas
- Andy Kerr
- Michael Merrifield
- Dominick Moreno
- Jeanne Nicholson, former
- Gloria Tanner, former
- Nancy Todd
- Pat Steadman, former
- Angela Williams
- Rachel Zenzinger

National figures

- Betsy Markey, former U.S. representative CO-4
- Ed Perlmutter, U.S. representative CO-7
- Bill Ritter, former governor
- Ken Salazar, former U.S. secretary of the interior
- Gail Schoettler, former lieutenant governor

State representatives

- Jeni Arndt
- KC Becker, majority leader
- Jeff Bridges
- Janet Buckner
- James Coleman
- Jessie Danielson
- Daneya Esgar
- Mike Foote (also candidate for DA)
- Alec Garnett
- Joann Ginal
- Matt Gray
- Millie Hamner
- Chris Hansen
- Leslie Herod
- Edie Hooton
- Dominique Jackson
- Dafna Michaelson Jenet
- Chris Kennedy
- Tracy Kraft-Tharp
- Pete Lee
- Susan Lontine
- Barbara McLachlan
- Jovan Melton
- Dan Pabon
- Brittney Pettersen
- Dylan Roberts
- Jonathan Singer
- Faith Winter

Individuals

- Brother Jeff Fard, Denver community leader
- Jane Goff, state board of education member
- Sal Pace, Pueblo county commissioner
- Shakti, Lakewood city councilwoman
- Kris Teegardin, mayor of Edgewater

==== Results ====
Democratic primary results
Party	Candidate	Votes	%
Democratic	Dave Young	359,391	67.52
Democratic	Bernard Douthit	172,855	32.48
Total votes		532,246	100.0

=== Republican primary ===
- Justin Everett, state representative
- Polly Lawrence, state representative
- Brian Watson, businessman

==== Eliminated at convention ====
- Brett Barkey, district attorney for Colorado's 14th judicial district
- Brita Horn, Routt County treasurer
- Kevin Lundberg, state senator

==== Declined ====
- Owen Hill, state senator (running for CO-05)
- Tim Kauffman, Jefferson County Treasurer
- Nic Morse, nominee for CO-02 in 2016

==== Results ====
Republican primary results
Party	Candidate	Votes	%
Republican	Brian Watson	170,225	37.99
Republican	Justin Everett	165,322	36.90
Republican	Polly Lawrence	112,487	25.11
Total votes		448,034	100.0

=== General election ===
==== Results ====
Colorado State Treasurer election, 2018
Party	Candidate	Votes	%
Democratic	Dave Young	1,292,281	52.2
Republican	Brian Watson	1,111,641	44.9
Constitution	Gerald F. Kilpatrick	70,475	2.9
Total votes		2,474,397	100.0
Democratic gain from Republican			

== Colorado State Board of Education ==
Two seats on the seven-member State Board of Education were up for election in 2018.

District	Party	Incumbent	Status	Party	Candidate	Votes	%
2	Democratic	Angelika Schroeder	running	Democratic	Angelika Schroeder	266,093	63.69%
2	Democratic	Angelika Schroeder	running	Republican	Johnny Barrett	151,727	36.31%
4	Republican	Pam Mazanec	not running	Republican	Debora Scheffel	217,225	61.04%
4	Republican	Pam Mazanec	not running	Democratic	Tim Krug	138,649	38.96%

Source: Colorado Secretary of State

== Regents of the University of Colorado ==
Three seats on the University of Colorado Board of Regents were up for election in 2018.

District	Party	Incumbent	Status	Party	Candidate	Votes	%
3	Republican	Glen Gallegos	running	Republican	Glen Gallegos	159,514	50.74%
3	Republican	Glen Gallegos	running	Democratic	Alvin Rivera	136,583	43.44%
3	Republican	Glen Gallegos	running	Libertarian	Michael Stapleton	18,305	5.82%
5	Republican	Kyle Hybl	term-limited	Republican	Chance Hill	189,688	61.28%
5	Republican	Kyle Hybl	term-limited	Democratic	Tony Wolusky	119,866	38.72%

Source: Colorado Secretary of State

=== At-large seat ===
Incumbent Democrat Stephen Ludwig is term-limited and therefore ineligible for re-election.

==== Candidates ====
- Ken Montera (Republican), retired executive
- Lesley Smith (Democratic), professor
- James Treibert (Libertarian), library and sales professional
- Christopher Otwell (Unity), systems engineer

==== Results ====
Results by county Smith: 40–50%; 50–60%; 60–70%; 70–80%; Montera: 40–50%; 50–60%; 60–70%; 70–80%; 80–90%

2018 University of Colorado Board of Regents at-large election
Party	Candidate	Votes	%
Democratic	Lesley Smith	1,246,318	51.95
Republican	Ken Montera	1,031,993	43.02
Libertarian	James Treibert	91,586	3.82
Unity	Christopher Otwell	29,128	1.21
Total votes		2,399,025	100
Democratic hold			

== State legislature ==
=== State senate ===
In the 2018 elections, 17 of the 35 seats in the Colorado State Senate were on the ballot. Democrats gained two seats and a 19–16 majority, which ended Republican control of the chamber.

=== State house ===
In the 2018 elections, all 65 seats in the Colorado House of Representatives were up for election. The Democrats were able to expand their majority to 41–24, by gaining five seats from the Republicans.

== State judiciary ==
=== Supreme Court ===
One justice on the Colorado Supreme Court was up for retention in 2018.

==== Justice Gabriel retention ====
Justice Richard Gabriel was appointed by governor Hickenlooper in 2015 to succeed outgoing Gregory Hobbs.

Results by county For: 50–60%; 60–70%; 70–80%; 80–90%

Colorado Supreme Court Justice Gabriel retention election
Choice	Votes	%
For	1,497,141	74.32
Against	517,347	25.68
Total	2,014,488	100.00
Source: Colorado Secretary of State

=== Court of Appeals ===
The terms of five judges on the Colorado Court of Appeals were set to expire on January 7, 2019. Four of them ran for retention while judge Nancy Lichstenstein chose to retire.

==== Judge Dailey retention ====
Judge John Dailey has been serving in the court since 2000, having been appointed by governor Bill Owens.

Results by county For: 60–70%; 70–80%; 80–90%

Colorado Court of Appeals Judge Dailey retention election
Choice	Votes	%
For	1,476,600	73.81
Against	523,912	26.19
Total	2,000,512	100.00
Source: Colorado Secretary of State

==== Judge Freyer retention ====
Rebecca Freyre was appointed by governor Hickenlooper in 2015 to fill the vacancy created by the appointment of Richard Gabriel to the Supreme Court.

Results by county For: 50–60%; 60–70%; 70–80%; 80–90%

Colorado Court of Appeals Judge Freyer retention election
Choice	Votes	%
For	1,495,184	74.69
Against	506,734	25.31
Total	2,001,918	100.00
Source: Colorado Secretary of State

==== Judge Harris retention ====
Results by county For: 50–60%; 60–70%; 70–80%; Against: 50–60%

Elizabeth Harris was appointed by governor Hickenlooper in 2015 to replace outgoing James Casebolt.

Colorado Court of Appeals Judge Harris retention election
Choice	Votes	%
For	1,268,530	63.49
Against	729,496	36.51
Total	1,998,026	100.00
Source: Colorado Secretary of State

==== Judge Richman retention ====
David Richman was appointed by governor Bill Ritter in 2008 to one of the three newly created seats following an expansion of the court.

Results by county For: 50–60%; 60–70%; 70–80%; 80–90%

Colorado Court of Appeals Judge Richman retention election
Choice	Votes	%
For	1,446,472	72.89
Against	537,887	27.11
Total	1,984,359	100.00
Source: Colorado Secretary of State

== Ballot measures ==
Thirteen statewide measures appeared on the ballot in 2018.

2018 Colorado ballot measures
Name	Description	Votes				Type
Name	Description	Yes	%	No	%	Type
Amendment A	Amends the state constitution, prohibiting slavery as a punishment for a crime.	1,599,790	66.21	816,342	33.79	Legislatively referred constitutional amendment
Amendment V	Reduces age of qualification for legislative members from 25 to 21.	889,179	36.19	1,567,560	63.81	Legislatively referred constitutional amendment
Amendment W	Shortens language on the Colorado ballot regarding judicial retention by consolidating questions.	1,262,713	53.81	1,083,712	46.19 (Note: With the passage of Amendment 71 (2016), constitutional amendments require 55% of the vote in order to pass.)	Legislatively referred constitutional amendment
Amendment X	Changes the definition of "industrial hemp" from a constitutional definition to a statutory definition.	1,421,630	60.64	922,597	39.36	Legislatively referred constitutional amendment
Amendment Y	Establishes an independent commission for congressional redistricting.	1,711,008	71.37	686,260	28.63	Legislatively referred constitutional amendment
Amendment Z	Establishes an independent commission for state legislative redistricting.	1,687,583	71.07	687,113	28.93	Legislatively referred constitutional amendment
Amendment 73	Establishes income tax brackets and raises taxes to fund education.	1,137,527	46.43	1,312,331	53.57	Combined initiated constitutional amendment and state statute
Amendment 74	Requires that property owners be compensated for any reduction in property value caused by state laws or regulations.	1,139,205	46.42	1,315,182	53.58	Citizen-initiated constitutional amendment
Amendment 75	Provides that if any candidate for state office directs more than one million dollars in support of their own campaign, then every candidate for the same office in the same primary or general election may accept five times the aggregate amount of campaign contributions normally allowed.	813,861	34.04	1,576,835	65.96	Citizen-initiated constitutional amendment
Proposition 109	Authorizes bonds for transportation projects without raising taxes.	952,814	39.28	1,472,933	60.72	Citizen-initiated state statute
Proposition 110	Authorizes $6 billion in bonds to fund transportation projects, establishes the Transportation Revenue Anticipation Notes Citizen Oversight Committee, and raises the state sales tax rate from 2.9% to 3.52% for 20 years starting on January 1, 2019.	990,287	40.61	1,448,535	59.39	Citizen-initiated state statute
Proposition 111	Restricts the charges on payday loans to a yearly rate of 36%.	1,865,200	77.25	549,357	22.75	Citizen-initiated state statute
Proposition 112	Mandates minimum setbacks for new oil and gas development projects, including fracking.	1,116,738	44.88	1,371,284	55.12	Citizen-initiated state statute
Source: Colorado Secretary of State

Results by county

Amendment A results by county
Yes:
- 80–90%
- 70–80%
- 60–70%
- 50–60%
No:
- 60–70%
- 50–60%

Amendment V results by county
No:
- 80–90%
- 70–80%
- 60–70%
- 50–60%
Yes:
- 50–60%

Amendment W results by county
No:
- 60–70%
- 50–60%
Yes:
- 60–70%
- 50–60%

Amendment X results by county
Yes:
- 70–80%
- 60–70%
- 50–60%
No:
- 50–60%

Amendment Y results by county
Yes:
- 80–90%
- 70–80%
- 60–70%
- 50–60%
No:
- 50–60%

Amendment Z results by county
Yes:
- 80–90%
- 70–80%
- 60–70%
- 50–60%
No:
- 50–60%

Amendment 73 results by county
No:
- 70–80%
- 60–70%
- 50–60%
Yes:
- 60–70%
- 50–60%

Amendment 74 results by county
No:
- 60–70%
- 50–60%
Yes:
- 60–70%
- 50–60%

Amendment 75 results by county
No:
- 70–80%
- 60–70%
- 50–60%

Proposition 109 results by county
No:
- 70–80%
- 60–70%
- 50–60%

Proposition 110 results by county
No:
- 80–90%
- 70–80%
- 60–70%
- 50–60%
Yes:
- 50–60%

Proposition 111 results by county
Yes:
- 80–90%
- 70–80%
- 60–70%
- 50–60%
No:
- 50–60%

Proposition 112 results by county
No:
- >90%
- 80–90%
- 70–80%
- 60–70%
- 50–60%
Yes:
- 70–80%
- 60–70%
- 50–60%
