= Dickey Lee Hullinghorst =

American politician from Colorado

58th Speaker of the Colorado House of Representatives
- In office January 7, 2015 – January 11, 2017
- Preceded by: Mark Ferrandino
- Succeeded by: Crisanta Duran

Member of the Colorado House of Representatives from the 10th district
- In office January 7, 2009 – January 11, 2017
- Preceded by: Alice Madden
- Succeeded by: Edie Hooton

Personal details
- Born: July 27, 1943 (age 83) Maywood, Nebraska, U.S.
- Party: Democratic
- Spouse: Bob
- Children: Lara
- Education: University of Wyoming; University of Colorado, Denver
- Occupation: Politician

Dickey Lee Hullinghorst (born July 27, 1943) is an American politician and former legislator in the U.S. state of Colorado and a former Speaker of the House of the Colorado House of Representatives. She was elected as a Democrat in 2008. Hullinghorst represented House District 10, which encompasses central eastern Boulder and northeastern Boulder County, Colorado. She is only the second woman in state history to hold that position. It was the first time since 1880 that a lawmaker from Boulder County was the Speaker of the House.

== Biography ==
Born Dickey Lee Shepard (named after her father, Richard), in Maywood, Nebraska, Hullinghorst earned a bachelor's degree in sociology from the University of Wyoming in 1965 and has completed graduate work in public policy at the University of Colorado, Denver. She has worked as a computer programmer for the U.S. Department of Housing and Urban Development in Washington, D.C., as legislative affairs director for the Colorado Open Space Council from 1979 to 1980 and as senior vice president for Herrick S. Roth Associates, a Denver-based public policy consulting firm, from 1980 to 1985.

Starting in 1985, Hullinghorst worked as Intergovernmental Relations Director for Boulder County, Colorado. She spearheaded the 2003 creation of the "Boulder County Countywide Coordinated Comprehensive Development Plan Intergovernmental Agreement," or "Super IGA," governing Boulder County development and land-preservation policies over a two-decade timeframe. In recognition of this work, she received the Metro Vision First Place Award from the Denver Regional Council of Governments (DRCOG) and the National Association of Counties (NACo) intergovernmental cooperation award. She also received the Local Government Collaboration Gold Award for work on an IGA targeting Colorado State Highway 42 revitalization. Additionally, Hullinghorst's position entailed lobbying the state legislature on behalf of Boulder County. Hullinghorst retired in December 2007 upon announcing her campaign for the state legislature.

She has served on a number of local boards and commissions, including Boulder County's Parks and Open Space Advisory Committee, Healthy Communities Steering Committee, Resource Conservation Advisory Board, and Mental Health Center Board, as well as the city of Boulder's Blue Ribbon Commission on Revenue Stability. During the early 1980s, Hullinghorst received gubernatorial appointments to the Colorado Mined Land Reclamation Board, the Front Range Project Steering Committee, and the Metropolitan Water Roundtable. She helped found the Colorado Open Lands Board, and served on the boards of EcoCycle, Political Action for Conservation, and PLAN Boulder County. Hullinghorst also once played oboe with the Longmont symphony.

A veteran of Democratic Party politics, Hullinghorst was a delegate to the 1976 Democratic National Convention and has served in a number of roles with the Boulder County Democratic Party, as a precinct committeeperson, member of the central and executive committees, finance chair, GOTV co-chair, county vice-chair, and as county chair from 1975 to 1979. She has also served on the executive committee of the Colorado Democratic Party, and vice-president of the Colorado Women's Political Caucus in the 1970s and as president of the Colorado Democratic Women's Political Action from 2000 to 2002.

Hullinghorst currently lives in Gunbarrel, Colorado. Her husband, Bob Hullinghorst, was Boulder County Treasurer. They have one daughter, Lara.

== Legislative career ==
=== 2008 campaign ===
In October 2007, Hullinghorst announced her candidacy for the state house seat in District 10 being vacated by term-limited Rep. Alice Madden. She had no opposition in the Democratic primary and, in the general election, faced Republican Dorothy Marshall, a Boulder health insurance agent whose bid was endorsed by the Denver Post. Hullinghorst's campaign, however, was endorsed by the Boulder Daily Camera and the Boulder Weekly. Hullinghorst touted her government experience, and emphasized tax reform and the state budget in her legislative campaign. She ultimately won the general election with 75 percent of the popular vote.

=== 2009 legislative session ===
For the 2009 legislative session, Hullinghorst was named to seats on the House Agriculture and Natural Resources Committee and the House State, Veterans, and Military Affairs Committee.

=== 2010 legislative session ===
For the 2010 legislative session, Hullinghorst was named to the House Appropriations Committee, filling a seat previously held by Representative Kathleen Curry.

=== 2012 election ===
In the 2012 General Election, Representative Hullinghorst faced Republican challenger William H. Eckert. Hullinghorst was reelected by a wide margin of 80% to 20%.

== See also ==
- List of female speakers of legislatures in the United States
