= Sarah Woodson =

American politician

Scott Baldermann

Member-elect of the Colorado House of Representatives from the 42nd district
- Assuming office January 2027
- Succeeding: Mandy Lindsay

Personal details
- Party: Democratic

Sarah Woodson is an American politician. A member of the Democratic Party, she is the member-elect for the 42nd district of the Colorado House of Representatives.
