= Justin Everett =

American politician

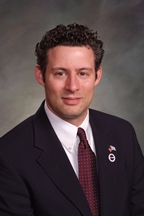
- Everett in 2013

Member of the Colorado House of Representatives from the 22nd district
- In office January 9, 2013 – January 4, 2019
- Preceded by: Ken Summers
- Succeeded by: Colin Larson

Personal details
- Born: Justin David Everett; August 5, 1971 (age 54)
- Party: Republican
- Education: University of Colorado Denver (MBA); University of Denver (JD)
- Website: Campaign website

Justin David Everett (born 5 August 1971) is an American politician who served in the Colorado House of Representatives from the 22nd district from 2013 to 2019, as a member of the Republican Party. During his tenure in the state house he was referred to as Dr. No for his opposition to large amounts of legislation with him being the legislator who voted against the most legislation.

Everett's family came from New York, and he was educated at the University of Colorado Denver and the University of Colorado Denver. He was elected to the state house in the 2012 election and served until he ran for Colorado State Treasurer in the 2018 election. He left the state house in 2018, in a failed primary campaign for state treasurer and later unsuccessfully ran for his seat in the state house in the 2020 election.

== Early life ==
Justin David Everett's family was from New York, and they moved to Colorado in 1978. He graduated from the University of Colorado Denver with a master of business administration degree and graduated from the Sturm College of Law at the University of Denver with a juris doctor.

== Career ==
=== Colorado House of Representatives ===
==== Elections ====
Everett ran for the Republican nomination for a seat in the Colorado House of Representatives in the 2012 election. He defeated Loren Bauman in the Republican primary and defeated Democratic nominee Mary Parker and Libertarian nominee Lynn L. Weitzel in the general election. He defeated Bauman in the 2014 primary and defeated Democratic nominee Parker and Libertarian nominee Weitzel in the general election. He defeated Parker in the 2016 election when she ran as an independent candidate. Colin Larson was elected to succeed Everett in 2018.

Everett ran for state house in the 2020 election and the virtual assembly voted by acclamation to place him at the top of the primary ballot, but he was defeated by Larson in the primary.

==== Tenure ====
Everett was referred to as Dr. No, first by Representative Max Tyler, and as Justin Neverett for him forcing the reading of all legislation and then voting no. He voted against 48% of legislation in 2015, which was more than any other member of the state house.

=== Statewide campaign ===
Everett announced on April 18, 2017, that he would run for the Republican nomination for Colorado State Treasurer to succeed Walker Stapleton, who was term-limited. During the campaign he was endorsed by United States Representative Ken Buck. He received forty-nine percent of delegate vote at the assembly while none of the other candidates received more than the thirty percent required to be placed onto the primary ballot. Brian Watson defeated Everett in the Republican primary and lost in the general election to Democratic nominee Dave Young.

== Electoral history ==
Justin Everett electoral history

2012 Colorado House of Representatives 22nd district Republican primary
Party	Candidate	Votes	%
Republican	Justin Everett	3,664	64.94%
Republican	Loren Bauman	1,978	35.06%
Total votes		5,642	100.00%

2012 Colorado House of Representatives 22nd district election
Party	Candidate	Votes	%
Republican	Justin Everett	23,117	52.32%
Democratic	Mary Parker	19,289	43.65%
Libertarian	Lynn L. Weitzel	1,781	4.03%
Total votes		44,187	100.00%

2014 Colorado House of Representatives 22nd district Republican primary
Party	Candidate	Votes	%	±%
Republican	Justin Everett (incumbent)	5,433	70.87%	+5.93%
Republican	Loren Bauman	2,233	29.13%	−5.93%
Total votes		7,666	100.00%	

2014 Colorado House of Representatives 22nd district election
Party	Candidate	Votes	%	±%
Republican	Justin Everett (incumbent)	20,396	55.37%	+3.05%
Democratic	Mary Parker	14,748	40.04%	−3.61%
Libertarian	Lynn L. Weitzel	1,693	4.60%	+0.57%
Total votes		36,837	100.00%	

2016 Colorado House of Representatives 22nd district Republican primary
Party	Candidate	Votes	%	±%
Republican	Justin Everett (incumbent)	5,375	100.00%	+29.13%
Total votes		5,375	100.00%	

2016 Colorado House of Representatives 22nd district election
Party	Candidate	Votes	%	±%
Republican	Justin Everett (incumbent)	26,311	60.46%	+5.09%
Independent	Mary Parker	17,207	39.54%	−0.50%
Total votes		43,518	100.00%	

2018 Colorado Treasurer Republican primary
Party	Candidate	Votes	%	±%
Republican	Brian Watson	171,823	37.97%	
Republican	Justin Everett	167,045	36.91%	
Republican	Polly Lawrence	113,673	25.12%	
Total votes		452,541	100.00%	

2020 Colorado House of Representatives 22nd district Republican primary
Party	Candidate	Votes	%	±%
Republican	Colin Larson (incumbent)	6,760	56.21%	
Republican	Justin Everett	5,266	43.79%	
Total votes		12,026	100.00%	
