= Deb Gardner =

American politician

Member of the Colorado House of Representatives from the 11th district
- In office January 11, 2011 – January 9, 2012
- Preceded by: Jack Pommer
- Succeeded by: Jonathan Singer

Personal details
- Born: May 13, 1949 (age 77)
- Party: Democratic
- Education: Metropolitan State College of Denver; Knox College
- Profession: Accountant

Deb Gardner (born May 13, 1949) is a County Commissioner of Boulder County in the U.S. state of Colorado. She was elected in January 2012 as a Democrat to fill the seat vacated by Ben Pearlman.

Prior to her service on the Board of County Commissioners, Gardner served as a Colorado legislator. She was elected to the Colorado House of Representatives in 2010 to represent House District 11, which includes Northwest Boulder, part of Niwot, Waterstone, part of Gunbarrel, and most of Longmont which is where Gardner lives in Boulder County. In that election, Gardner defeated Republican Wes Whiteley 59.4 to 40.5 percent.
