= Bruce Cairns =

American politician

Member of the Colorado Senate from the 28th district
- In office January 10, 2001 – January 12, 2005
- Preceded by: Elsie Lacy
- Succeeded by: Suzanne Williams

Personal details
- Party: Republican

Bruce Cairns is an American politician who served in the Colorado Senate from the 28th district from 2001 to 2005.
