= Colorado's 11th House of Representatives district =

American legislative district

Colorado's 11th State House of Representatives district
Representative
Karen McCormick; D–Hygiene
- Demographics: 66% White; 1% Black; 25% Hispanic; 4% Asian; 0% Native American; 5% Multiracial
- Population (2021): 87,799

Colorado's 11th House of Representatives district is one of 65 single member districts in the Colorado House of Representatives. It has been represented by Democrat Karen McCormick since 2021.

== Geography ==
District 11 is based on the city of Longmont, Colorado.

== Members ==
- Jack Pommer (until 2011)
- Deb Gardner (2011–2012)
- Jonathan Singer (2012–2021)
- Karen McCormick (since 2021)
