= Colorado's 42nd House of Representatives district =

American legislative district

Colorado's 42nd State House of Representatives district
Representative
Mandy Lindsay; D–Aurora
- Demographics: 24% White; 21% Black; 45% Hispanic; 4% Asian; 0% Native American; 5% Multiracial
- Population (2024): 91,220

Colorado's 42nd House of Representatives district is one of 65 districts in the Colorado House of Representatives. It has been represented by Mandy Lindsay since 2022.
