= Junie Joseph =

American politician

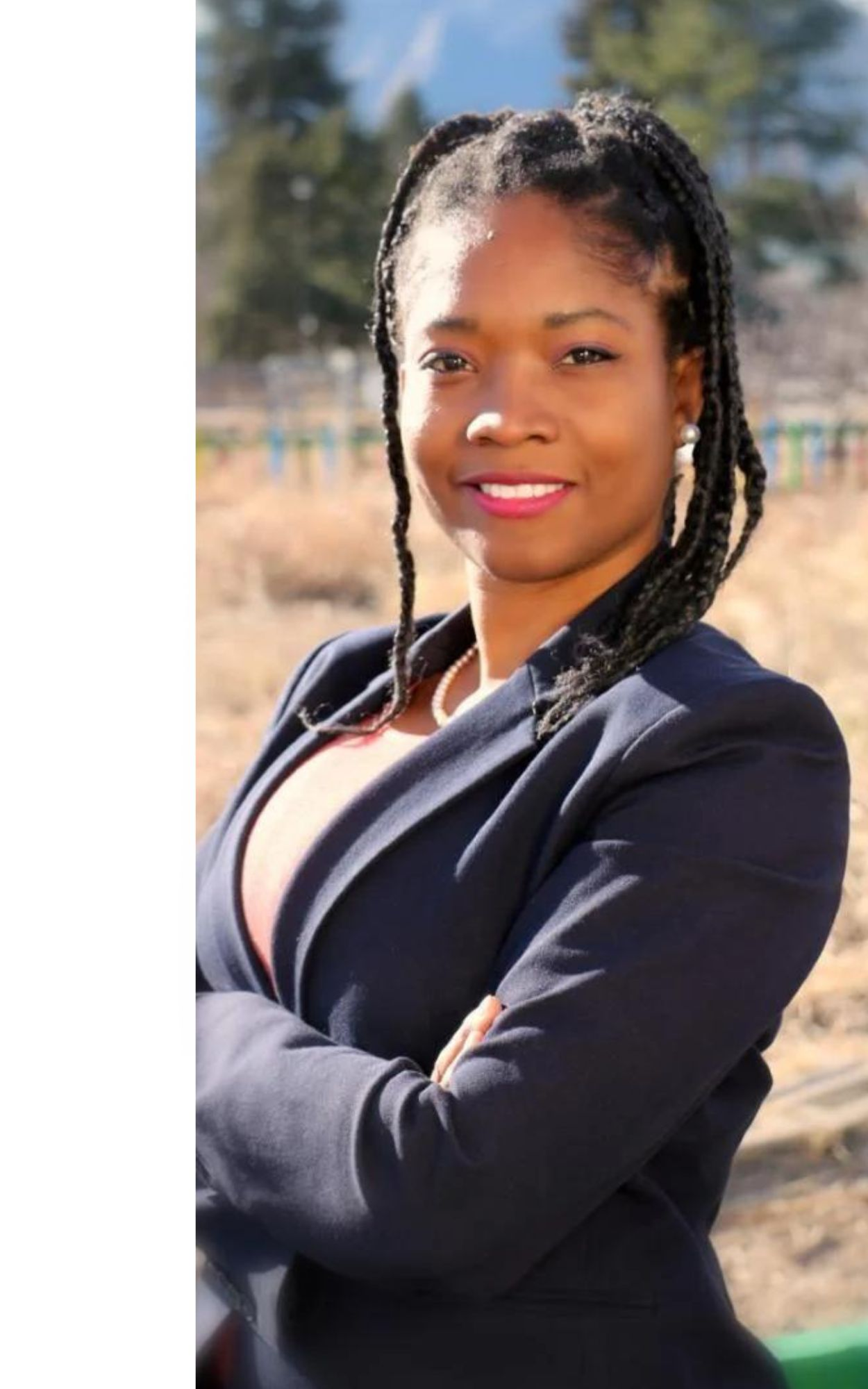
- Joseph in 2022

Member of the Colorado House of Representatives from the 10th district
- Incumbent
- Assumed office January 9, 2023
- Preceded by: Edie Hooton

Member of the Boulder City Council
- In office 2019–2023

Personal details
- Born: Port-au-Prince, Haiti
- Party: Democratic
- Education: University of Florida (BA); University of York (MA); University of Colorado, Boulder (JD)

Junie Joseph is an American attorney and politician serving as a member of the Colorado House of Representatives for the 10th district. Elected in November 2022, she assumed office on January 9, 2023.

== Early life and education ==
Joseph was born in Port-au-Prince, Haiti in 1985 or 1986, and moved with to her family to Florida at the age of 14. She earned a Bachelor of Arts degree in political science from the University of Florida and a Master of Arts in applied human rights from the University of York. She earned a Juris Doctor from the University of Colorado Law School.

== Career ==
Joseph worked in the Office of the United Nations High Commissioner for Human Rights as an intern and was a fellow on a United States Agency for International Development program. Joseph was elected to the Boulder City Council in 2019 and the Colorado House of Representatives in November 2022. Joseph was a 2024 presidential elector, pledged to vote for Kamala Harris.
