= Karen McCormick =

American politician and veterinarian

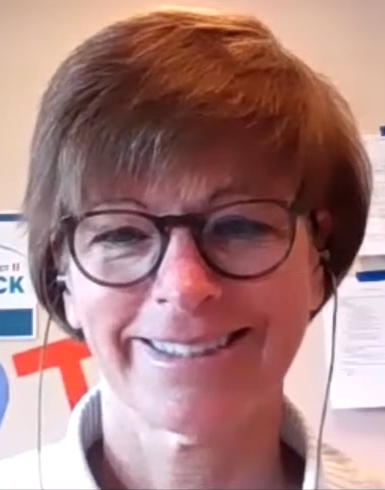
- McCormick in 2020

Member of the Colorado House of Representatives from the 11th district
- Incumbent
- Assumed office January 13, 2021
- Preceded by: Jonathan Singer

Personal details
- Party: Democratic
- Children: 3
- Education: University of Florida (BS, DVM)

Karen McCormick Perry is an American politician and veterinarian serving as a member of the Colorado House of Representatives from the 11th district. Elected in November 2020, she assumed office on January 13, 2021.

== Education ==
McCormick earned a Bachelor of Science degree in dairy science from the University of Florida and a Doctor of Veterinary Medicine from the University of Florida College of Veterinary Medicine.

== Career ==
McCormick owned and operated a veterinary clinic for 16 years. She has also worked as a communications coach at the Colorado State University Veterinary Teaching Hospital. In 2018, McCormick was the Democratic nominee for Colorado's 4th congressional district, losing to incumbent Republican Ken Buck. McCormick was elected to the Colorado House of Representatives in November 2020 and assumed office on January 13, 2021.

== Personal life ==
McCormick and her husband have three children and live in Longmont, Colorado.
