= Alice Madden =

American politician from Colorado

Majority Leader of the Colorado House of Representatives
- In office January 2005 – January 2009
- Preceded by: Keith King
- Succeeded by: Paul Weissmann

Member of the Colorado House of Representatives from the 10th district 14th district (2001–2003)
- In office January 2001 – January 2009
- Preceded by: Ron Tupa
- Succeeded by: Dickey Lee Hullinghorst

Personal details
- Born: Alice Donnelly Madden; December 9, 1958 (age 67) St. Louis, Missouri, U.S.
- Party: Democratic
- Education: University of Colorado, Boulder (BA, JD)
- Occupation: Attorney, politician

Alice Donnelly Madden (born December 9, 1958) is a politician from Colorado and member of the Democratic party. From 2001 to 2009, she served in the Colorado House of Representatives, representing the 10th district around Boulder. From 2005 to 2009, she served as Majority Leader.

Among the first bills Madden sponsored after being sworn in as a member of the Colorado General Assembly was a measure to require health insurance policies to include language indicating that the Colorado Insurance Commissioner has regulatory authority over such policies. During that 2001 session Madden also sponsored a bill that addressed the recycling of cathode-ray tube products. That bill was signed into law by the governor on June 6, 2001.

During the 2005 session of the legislature Madden sponsored a bill that would have amended the Colorado Anti-Discrimination Act to prohibit employment discrimination on the basis of sexual orientation and gender variance. Gov. Bill Owens vetoed the bill after it cleared both chambers of the legislature.

Between 2009 and 2011, Madden served as climate advisor and deputy chief of staff to Colorado governor Bill Ritter, and then, between 2013 and 2015, as principal deputy assistant secretary for intergovernmental and external affairs at the U.S. Department of Energy.

In 2016, she was a candidate for the University of Colorado Board of Regents, but she lost to Republican Heidi Ganahl in a close, 52%-48% race. Madden ran in the Democratic primary in the 2020 United States Senate election in Colorado, but she withdrew after former governor John Hickenlooper joined the race.

Colorado House of Representatives
Preceded by Keith King	Majority Leader of the Colorado House of Representatives; 2005–2009	Succeeded by Paul Weissmann
