= Elsie Lacy =

American politician

Member of the Colorado Senate from the 28th district
- In office January 13, 1993 – January 10, 2001
- Preceded by: Jack Fenlon
- Succeeded by: Bruce Cairns

Personal details
- Party: Republican

Elsie Lacy is an American politician who served in the Colorado Senate from the 28th district from 1993 to 2001.
