= Colorado's 10th House of Representatives district =

American legislative district

Colorado's 10th State House of Representatives district
Representative
Junie Joseph; D–Boulder
- Demographics: 76% White; 1% Black; 12% Hispanic; 6% Asian; 0% Native American; 5% Multiracial
- Population (2021): 87,951

Colorado's 10th House of Representatives district is one of 65 districts in the Colorado House of Representatives. It has been represented by Democrat Junie Joseph since 2023.

== Geography ==
District 10 is based in Boulder, Colorado.

== Members ==
- Alice Madden (2003–2009)
- Dickey Lee Hullinghorst (2009–2017)
- Edie Hooton (2017–2023)
- Junie Joseph (since 2023)
