= Suzanne Williams =

American politician

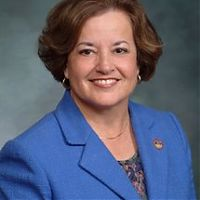

Member of the Colorado Senate from the 28th district
- In office 2004–2011
- Succeeded by: Nancy Todd

Personal details
- Party: Democratic
- Spouse: Ed
- Education: MA, Special Education, University of Colorado, 1974; BS, Baylor University, 1967
- Profession: Special Education Teacher, Cherry Creek School, 1978-2000; Learning Specialist, Public Education

Suzanne Williams is a politician in the U.S. state of Colorado. She is a Comanche; during her terms of office, she was the only enrolled American Indian state legislator in Colorado. She belongs to the Democratic Party.

Williams is related to J. Howard Williams, a former Texas president of the Southwestern Baptist Theological Seminary. Before running for office, she was a Special Education Professional in the Cherry Creek School District for 22 years.

In 2004, Williams was elected to the Colorado State Senate. She served as assistant caucus chair for the Senate Majority Caucus, vice-chair on the Business, Labor and Technology Committee, and vice-chair of the Transportation Committee. As an American Indian, she was the only enrolled Native state legislator in Colorado.

On December 26, 2010, Williams was involved in a fatal car crash near Channing, Texas. The car she was driving veered into oncoming traffic, killing Brianna Michelle Gomez. Williams' son and two grandsons were not wearing seatbelts and were hospitalized with injuries after being ejected from the vehicle. One of the injured grandchildren was not secured in a child seat as required by law. Williams faced a grand jury investigation; no criminal indictment was issued, but she was later cited with three misdemeanor traffic violations. Williams faced significant criticism for the seat belt violations given her advocacy for harsher seat belt violation penalties and her efforts to introduce legislation allowing police to pull over and ticket drivers should they suspect seat belts not in use. Consequently, she lost her expected promotion to Chairwoman of the Colorado State Senate Transportation Committee.

== See also ==
- List of Native American politicians
- Native American women in politics
