= Mandy Lindsay =

American politician

Member of the Colorado House of Representatives from the 42nd district
- Incumbent
- Assumed office January 18, 2022
- Preceded by: Dominique Jackson
- Succeeded by: Sarah Woodson (elect)

Personal details
- Party: Democratic
- Children: 4

Mandy Lindsay is an American politician serving as a member of the Colorado House of Representatives from the 42nd district. She assumed office on January 18, 2022, succeeding Dominique Jackson.

== Early life and education ==
Lindsay is a native of Littleton, Colorado, and graduated from Chatfield High School. She studied political science at Tulane University.

== Career ==
Lindsay has worked as an independent political organizer in Colorado. She also served as State Representative Dominique Jackson's legislative aide and was employed at a rapid vaccination clinic. Lindsay was appointed to the Colorado House of Representatives in January 2022 after Jackson took a position in the United States Department of Housing and Urban Development.

In November 2022, Lindsay was selected to serve as the Democratic caucus chair in the House.

=== 2026 election ===
Lindsay ran for re-election in the 2026 Colorado House of Representatives election. However, in the Democratic primary election held June 30, 2026, she was defeated by opponent Sarah Woodson.

== Investigation ==
In January 2026, Democratic State Representative Bob Marshall filed a complaint against Representative Lindsay alleging that she mismanaged funds for the Colorado House Democrats internal bank account as caucus co-chair. On May 11, 2026 the Colorado House Ethics Committee voted unanimously that there was probable cause that she knowingly mishandled her caucus' funds as the Democratic caucus co-chair.
