= Polly Lawrence =

American politician

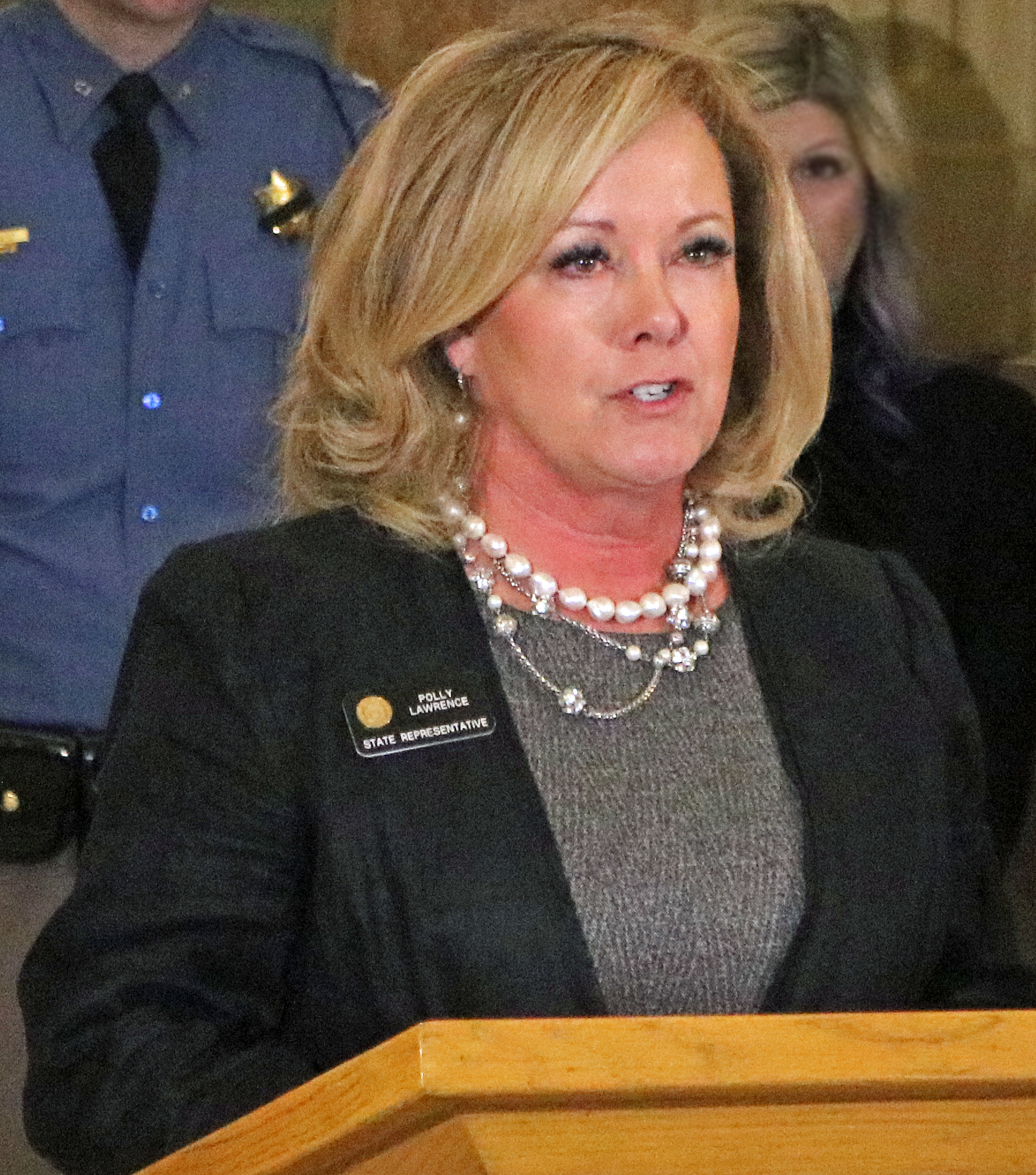
- Speaking in 2018.

Member of the Colorado House of Representatives from the 39th district
- In office January 9, 2013 – January 4, 2019
- Preceded by: David Balmer
- Succeeded by: Mark Baisley

Personal details
- Party: Republican
- Education: Colorado State University
- Website: pollylawrence.com

Polly Lawrence is an American politician and a former Republican member of the Colorado House of Representatives representing District 39 from January 9, 2013, to January 4, 2019.

== Education ==
Lawrence graduated from Colorado State University.

== Elections ==
- 2018 In July, 2017, Lawrence announced her candidacy for the Republican nomination for State Treasurer She lost in the primary election to fellow Republican Brian Watson.
- 2012 Redistricted to District 39, and with incumbent Republican Representative David Balmer running for Colorado Senate, Lawrence won the June 26, 2012 Republican Primary with 3,570 votes (53.5%); and won the three-way November 6, 2012 General election with 28,080 votes (64.6%) against Democratic nominee Carla Turner and Libertarian candidate Donna Price.
- 2010 When Republican Representative Mike May left the Legislature and left the District 44 seat open, Lawrence ran in the three-way August 10, 2010 Republican Primary, but lost to Chris Holbert, who went on to win the three-way November 2, 2010 General election.
