= Jonathan Singer (politician) =

American politician

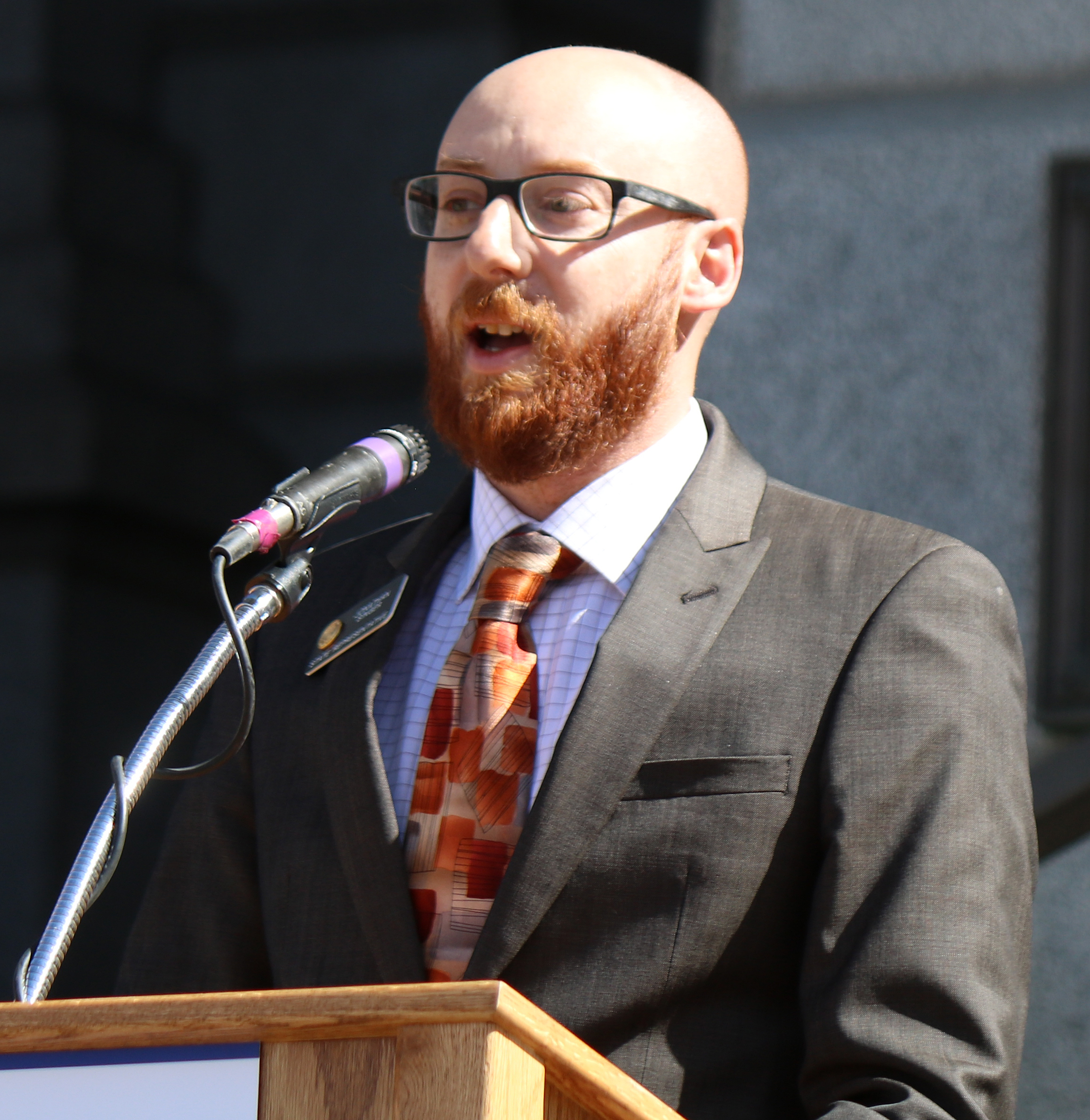
- Singer addressing an audience in 2017.

Member of the Colorado House of Representatives from the 11th district
- In office January 27, 2012 – January 13, 2021
- Preceded by: Deb Gardner
- Succeeded by: Karen McCormick

Personal details
- Born: September 13, 1979 (age 47) Dedham, Massachusetts
- Party: Democratic
- Education: Colorado State University
- Profession: Social worker
- Website: singerforcolorado.com

Jonathan Singer (born September 13, 1979) is a former legislator in the U.S. state of Colorado. He was appointed in January 2012 as a Democrat to fill a vacancy in House District 11, which includes most of Longmont, as well as Northwest Boulder, part of Niwot and part of Gunbarrel. He resides in Longmont.

== Biography ==
=== Education and career before election ===
Singer graduated from Colorado State University with a degree in Psychology and Social Work, and in 2002 earned a Master's degree in Social Work also from CSU. He worked for the Denver Office of Economic Development, and following that as a social worker in child protections for Boulder County. He also serves on the Longmont Planning and Zoning Commission. His political activities prior to joining the Colorado General Assembly include serving as President of the Longmont Area Democrats. Singer is Jewish.

== Legislative career ==
In November 2011, Singer announced his candidacy for the House District 11 seat after incumbent Rep. Deb Gardner announced her intention not to run for re-election. In January 2012, Rep. Gardner vacated the House seat to take an open seat on the Boulder County Commission. On January 21, 2012, Singer was elected by 45-5 vote of a vacancy committee of the Boulder County Democratic Party to fill the house seat, and was sworn in on January 27. In the House, he served on the Economic and Business Development Committee.

=== 2012 election ===
In the 2012 General Election, Representative Singer faced Republican challenger Ellyn Hilliard. Singer was reelected by a margin of 57% to 43%.
