= Northstar Commercial Partners =

- Type: Private company
- Industry: Real estate
- Founded: 2000
- Founder: Brian Watson
- Headquarters: Denver, Colorado, United States
- Area served: United States
- Key people: Brian Watson (CEO)
- Products: Real estate investments and development
- Website: www.northstarcommercialpartners.com

Northstar Commercial Partners is an American commercial real estate investment company headquartered in Denver, Colorado. Founded by Brian Watson in 2000, the company acquires distressed commercial real estate or vacant properties and rehabilitates them for lease or use.

== History ==
Brian Watson founded Northstar Commercial Partners in 2000.

In 2014, Northstar founded the Education Opportunity Fund, a $100 million real estate investment fund for identifying and restoring old retail or education buildings, which are then leased to charter schools. In addition, Northstar restores and leases other types of properties, such as warehouses, manufacturing centers, commercial offices, retail space, and senior care and medical facilities. In 2015, the firm launched Northstar Real Estate Opportunity Fund II, a $300 million private equity fund focused on institutional and private qualified or accredited investors. The company partnered with Integrity Trust of Colorado Springs in 2019 and launched the Northstar Integrity Growth Fund, a private investment trust focused on value-add properties.

In early 2026, the U.S. District Court for the District of Colorado found Northstar Commercial Partners guilty on two counts of securities fraud. Watson and his company were found to have defrauded investors in eleven different offerings.

== See also ==
- Real estate
- Real estate trends
- Real estate appraisal
- Real estate development
