= Maywood, Nebraska =

Village in Frontier County, Nebraska, United States

- Village
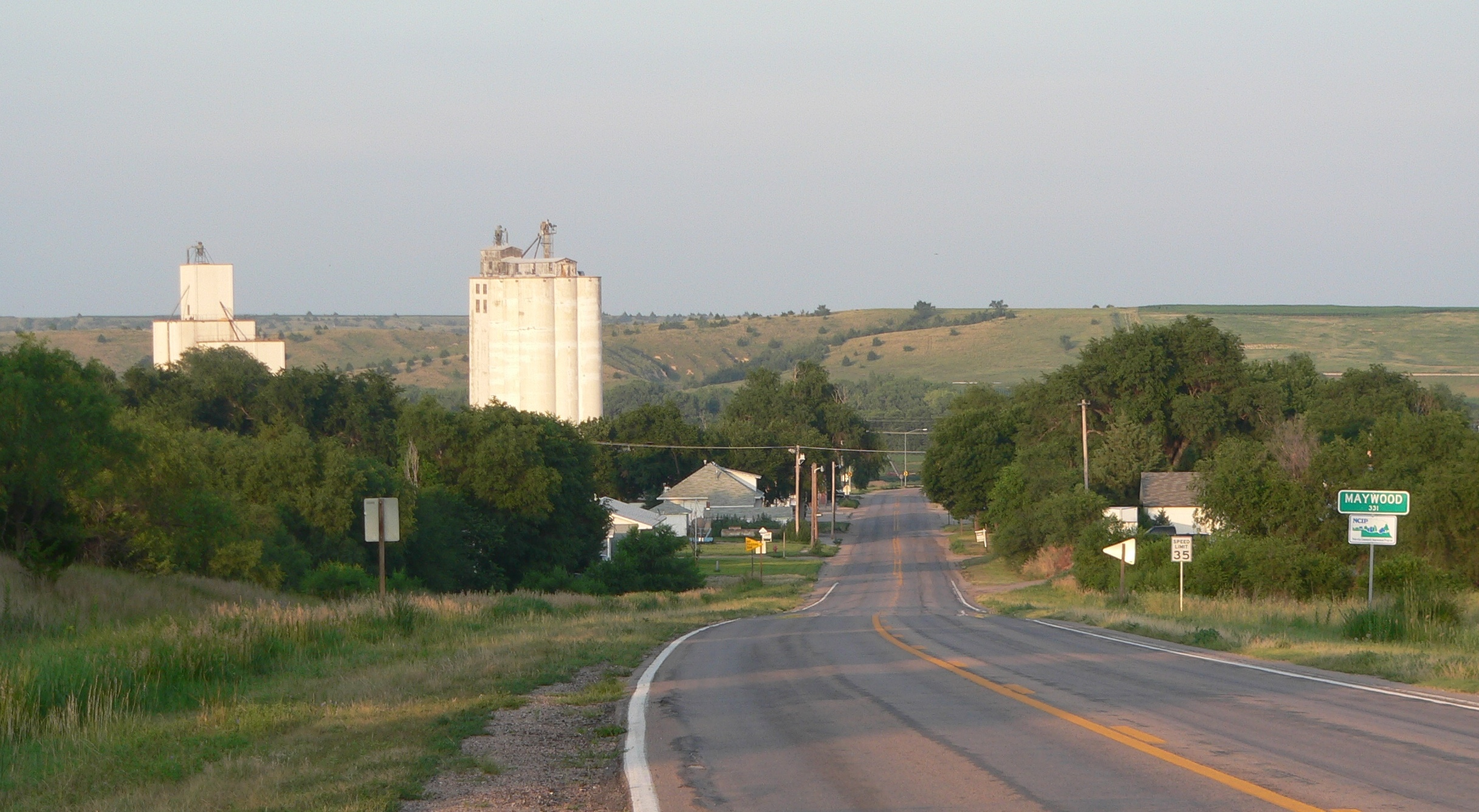
- Maywood, seen from the west along Nebraska Highway 23

- Location of Maywood, Nebraska
- Coordinates: 40°39′31″N 100°37′20″W
- Country: United States
- State: Nebraska
- County: Frontier

Area
  - Total: 0.63 sq mi (1.64 km^{2})
  - Land: 0.63 sq mi (1.64 km^{2})
  - Water: 0 sq mi (0.00 km^{2})
- Elevation: 2,681 ft (817 m)

Population (2020)
  - Total: 262
  - Density: 413.3/sq mi (159.56/km^{2})
- Time zone: UTC-6 (Central (CST))
  - Summer (DST): UTC-5 (CDT)
- ZIP code: 69038
- Area code: 308
- FIPS code: 31-31325
- GNIS feature ID: 2399281

Maywood is a village in Frontier County, Nebraska, United States. As of the 2020 census, Maywood had a population of 262.

== History ==
Maywood was founded in the 1880s. It was named for May Woods, the daughter of Israel Woods, the original owner of the town site.

== Geography ==
According to the United States Census Bureau, the village has a total area of 0.63 square miles (1.63 km^{2}), all of it land.

== Demographics ==
Historical population
Census	Pop.	Note	%±
1900	200		—
1910	443		121.5%
1920	533		20.3%
1930	525		−1.5%
1940	426		−18.9%
1950	409		−4.0%
1960	337		−17.6%
1970	309		−8.3%
1980	332		7.4%
1990	313		−5.7%
2000	331		5.8%
2010	261		−21.1%
2020	262		0.4%
U.S. Decennial Census

=== 2010 census ===
As of the census of 2010, there were 261 people, 117 households, and 76 families residing in the village. The population density was 414.3 inhabitants per square mile (160.0/km^{2}). There were 146 housing units at an average density of 231.7 per square mile (89.5/km^{2}). The racial makeup of the village was 97.3% White, 1.1% from other races, and 1.5% from two or more races. Hispanic or Latino of any race were 3.1% of the population.

There were 117 households, of which 23.9% had children under the age of 18 living with them, 56.4% were married couples living together, 3.4% had a female householder with no husband present, 5.1% had a male householder with no wife present, and 35.0% were non-families. 27.4% of all households were made up of individuals, and 12.8% had someone living alone who was 65 years of age or older. The average household size was 2.23 and the average family size was 2.68.

The median age in the village was 43.3 years. 19.9% of residents were under the age of 18; 8.9% were between the ages of 18 and 24; 22.6% were from 25 to 44; 29.1% were from 45 to 64; and 19.5% were 65 years of age or older. The gender makeup of the village was 47.9% male and 52.1% female.

=== 2000 census ===
As of the census of 2000, there were 331 people, 125 households, and 90 families residing in the village. The population density was 699.2 inhabitants per square mile (270.0/km^{2}). There were 138 housing units at an average density of 291.5 per square mile (112.5/km^{2}). The racial makeup of the village was 97.89% White, 0.91% Native American, 0.30% from other races, and 0.91% from two or more races. Hispanic or Latino of any race were 0.91% of the population.

There were 125 households, out of which 36.8% had children under the age of 18 living with them, 64.0% were married couples living together, 4.8% had a female householder with no husband present, and 28.0% were non-families. 23.2% of all households were made up of individuals, and 11.2% had someone living alone who was 65 years of age or older. The average household size was 2.64 and the average family size was 3.12.

In the village, the population was spread out, with 30.8% under the age of 18, 6.3% from 18 to 24, 26.6% from 25 to 44, 23.6% from 45 to 64, and 12.7% who were 65 years of age or older. The median age was 36 years. For every 100 females, there were 88.1 males. For every 100 females age 18 and over, there were 97.4 males.

As of 2000 the median income for a household in the village was $31,818, and the median income for a family was $35,536. Males had a median income of $29,531 versus $20,000 for females. The per capita income for the village was $15,303. About 5.7% of families and 3.6% of the population were below the poverty line, including 1.7% of those under age 18 and 9.4% of those age 65 or over.

== Education ==
It is in the Maywood Public Schools school district.

== See also ==
- List of municipalities in Nebraska
