= Jovan Melton =

American politician

Jovan E. Melton
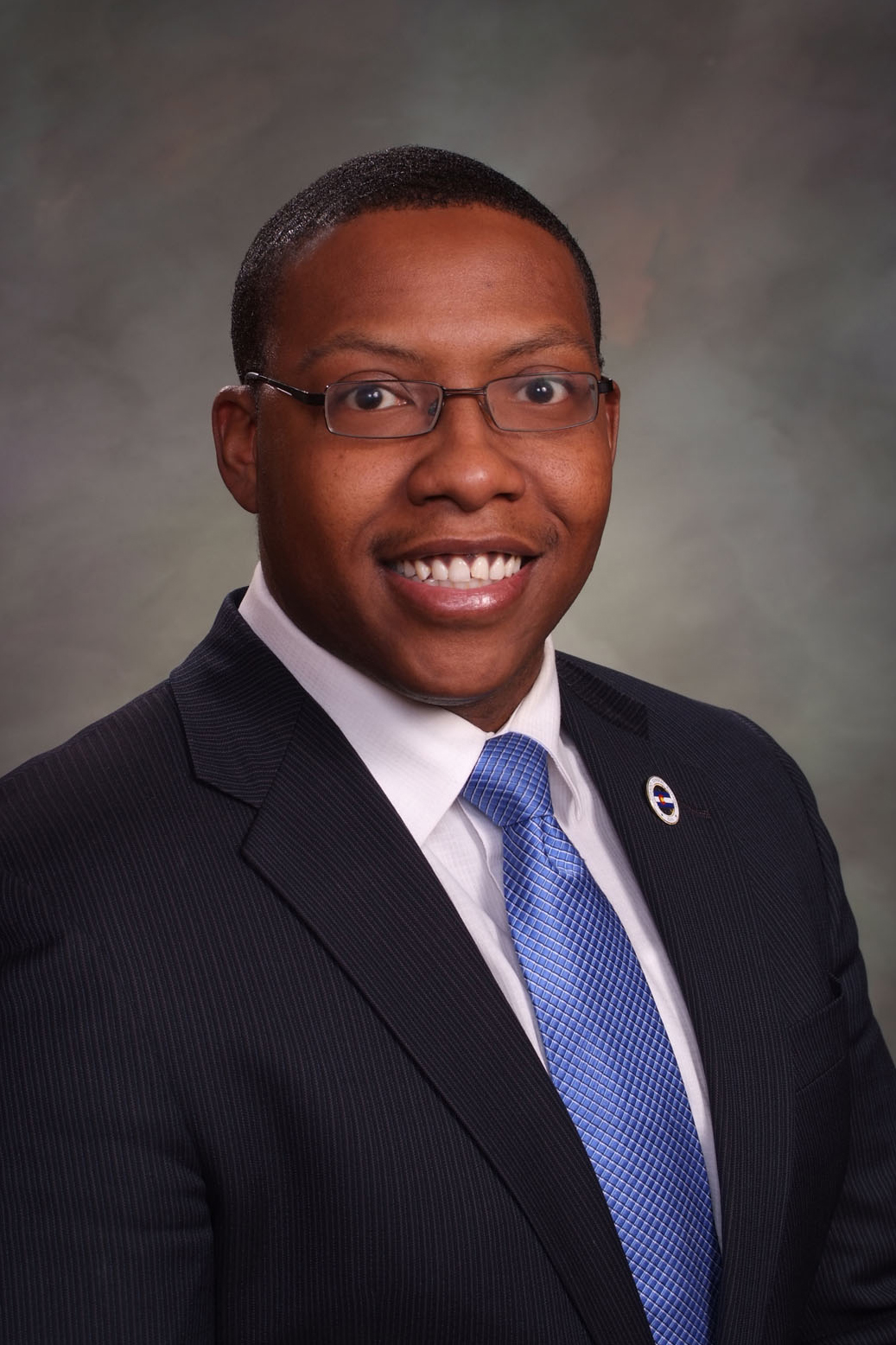

Member of the Colorado House of Representatives from the 41st district
- In office January 9, 2013 – January 13, 2021
- Preceded by: Nancy Todd
- Succeeded by: Iman Jodeh

Personal details
- Party: Democratic
- Education: University of Colorado, Boulder
- Website: http://www.jovanmelton.com

Jovan Melton is a former Democratic member of the Colorado House of Representatives, serving from 2013 to early 2021. Before serving in the House, Melton worked for Lieutenant Governor Barbara O'Brien, and managed the campaigns of state representatives Angela Williams and Rhonda Fields.

While a state representative, Melton served as the Democratic majority whip and as Vice-Chair of the Black Democratic Legislative Caucus of Colorado. He is also Founder and Senior Consultant for Emerson Hamilton Consulting and Strategies, LLC based in Aurora, Colorado.

At age 20, he was arrested for harassment of a girlfriend, an incident which occurred when he was a student at the University of Colorado. An arrest for assault of a different girlfriend in 2008 resulted in dismissal of charges. He has been accused by a fellow Democratic legislator of bullying, but no charges were filed. After his arrest history became widely known due to a report published in October 2018 by The Denver Post Democratic legislative leaders asked him to resign. However, he was strongly defended by Colorado African-American leaders Wellington Webb and Bishop Acen Phillips, who described the request for resignation as a "21st-century lynching" He has apologized for past behavior. Melton was re-elected in the November 2018 election following the Denver Post story with 64% of the vote against his republican challenger.
