= Dominique Jackson (politician) =

American politician

Regional Administrator of the United States Department of Housing and Urban Development for Region 8
- Incumbent
- Assumed office December 2021
- President: Joe Biden

Member of the Colorado House of Representatives from the 42nd district
- In office January 11, 2017 – December 20, 2021
- Preceded by: Rhonda Fields
- Succeeded by: Mandy Lindsay

Personal details
- Party: Democratic
- Education: Metropolitan State University of Denver (BA); University of Denver (MA)

Dominique Jackson is an American politician serving as an administrator of the United States Department of Housing and Urban Development for the 8th region. From 2017 to 2021, she represented the 42nd district in the Colorado House of Representatives.

== Early life and education ==
Jackson earned a Bachelor of Arts in communications from the Metropolitan State University of Denver and a Master of Arts in international and intercultural communications from the University of Denver.

== Career ==
Prior to her election to the Colorado State House, she worked as a communications consultant and served on Aurora's Citizens Advisory Committee for Housing and Community Development.

In the Colorado State House, Jackson served on the House Health, Insurance, & Environment Committee and the House Transportation & Energy Committee.

== Elections ==
Jackson was elected to the House of Representatives in 2016, winning with 68.91% of the vote against Republican opponent Mike Donald.
