= Nancy Todd =

American politician (born 1948)

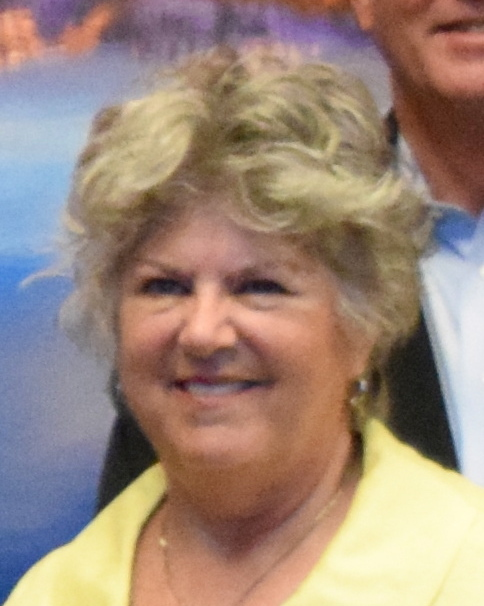

President pro tempore of the Colorado Senate
- In office January 17, 2020 – January 13, 2021
- Preceded by: Lois Court
- Succeeded by: Kerry Donovan

Member of the Colorado Senate from the 28th district
- In office January 9, 2013 – January 13, 2021
- Preceded by: Suzanne Williams
- Succeeded by: Janet Buckner

Member of the Colorado House of Representatives from the 41st district
- In office January 2005 – January 9, 2013
- Preceded by: Suzanne Williams
- Succeeded by: Jovan Melton

Personal details
- Born: October 28, 1948 (age 77) Lawrence, Kansas, U.S.
- Party: Democratic
- Education: University of Kansas (BS); University of Northern Colorado (MA)
- Website: Official website

Nancy Janann Todd (born October 28, 1948) is an American politician and a former Democratic member of the Colorado Senate. In the state senate, she represented District 28 from January 2013 to 2021. Previously, from January 2005 to January 9, 2013, Todd served in the Colorado House of Representatives, representing District 41.

In January 2020, Todd was elected President pro tempore of the Colorado Senate, filling a vacancy created when Lois Court resigned from the senate.

== Education ==
Todd earned her BS in education from the University of Kansas and her MA from the University of Northern Colorado.

== Elections ==
- 2012 When Democratic Senator Suzanne Williams retired and left the District 28 seat open, Todd was unopposed for the June 26, 2012 Democratic Primary, winning with 4,973 votes, and won the three-way November 6, 2012 General election with 37,181 votes (58.0%) against Republican nominee John Lyons and Libertarian candidate Robert Harrison.
- 2004 When Democratic Representative Suzanne Williams ran for Colorado Senate and left the House District 41 seat open, Todd was unopposed for the August 10, 2004 Democratic Primary, winning with 3,227 votes, and won the three-way 2004 General election with 16,066 votes (59.3%) against Republican nominee E. C. Gaffney, Jr. and Libertarian candidate Douglas Newmann, who had run for the seat in 2002.
- 2006 Todd was unopposed for the August 8, 2006 Democratic Primary, winning with 2,897 votes, and won the November 7, 2006 General election with 12,559 votes (65.0%) against Republican nominee Clyde Robinson, Jr.
- 2008 Todd was unopposed both for the August 12, 2008 Democratic Primary, winning with 3,409 votes, and also the November 4, 2008 General election, winning with 23,787 votes.
- 2010 Todd was unopposed for the August 10, 2010 Democratic Primary, winning with 4,925 votes, and won the November 2, 2010 General election with 13,019 votes (59.9%) against Republican nominee Brad Wagnon.
- 2016 Todd was opposed in the General Election by Republican candidate James Woodley in the November 8, 2016 Election. Todd won the seat with 55% of the vote.

Colorado Senate
Preceded by Lois Court	President pro tempore of the Colorado Senate; 2020–2021	Succeeded by Kerry Donovan
