= Brian Watson =

American businessman and politician (born 1971)

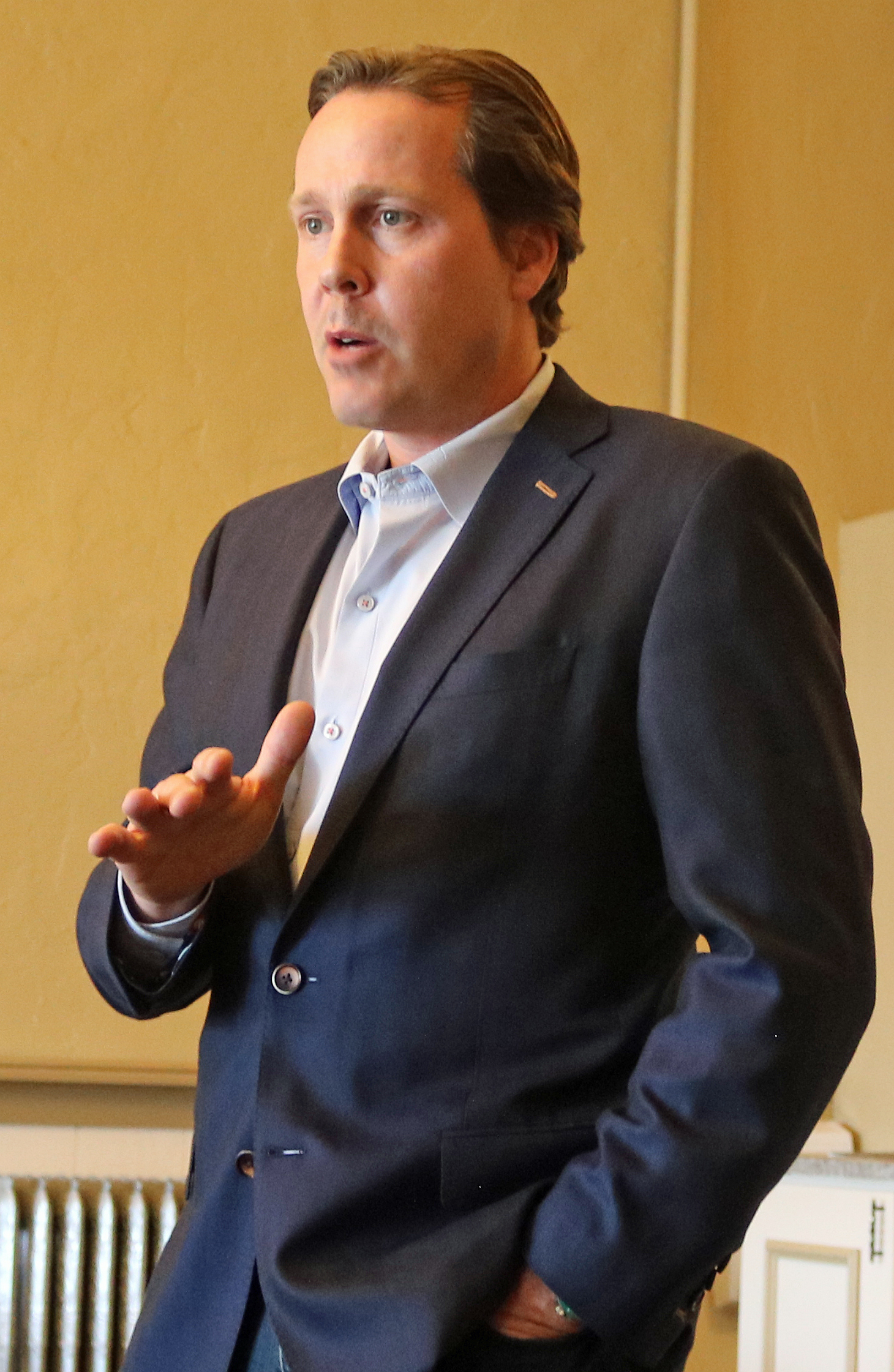
- Watson campaigning in 2018
- Born: October 28, 1971 (age 54); Middletown, New York, U.S.
- Occupation: Real estate
- Known for: Republican candidate, Colorado State Treasurer (2018).
- Political party: Republican
- Website: Official website

Brian Watson (born October 28, 1971) is an American real-estate businessman, author, and politician. He has been a commercial real estate owner and is the founder and CEO of Northstar Commercial Partners. Watson won the 2018 Republican primary for Colorado State Treasurer, beating two other candidates, but lost to Democrat Dave Young in the general election.

== Life ==
Watson graduated from the high school in Olathe, a small town in western Colorado. He received a Bachelor of Science degree in real estate at the University of Colorado Boulder and then joined Cushman & Wakefield of Colorado, Inc (C&W), an international commercial real estate firm. Watson is the founder of Opportunity Coalition, a nonprofit social welfare organization pursuant to IRC 501(c)(4). The organization says it promotes and facilitates a business-friendly culture for free markets, entrepreneurship, and collaboration. For his contributions to community development, he was interviewed by several local radio and television stations. The Opportunity Coalition also created the Mountains of Opportunity TV show series hosted by Watson. The show highlights the real-life stories of Colorado's entrepreneurs, innovators and job creators.

== Political career ==
Watson ran for Colorado House of Representatives District 3 in the 2012 elections. He first ran unopposed in the Republican primary on June 26, 2012, but was defeated by incumbent Daniel Kagan, a Democrat, in the general election on November 6, 2012.

Watson is a board member of the "Leadership Program of the Rockies", an organization that "identifies and brings together emerging leaders from the legal, economic, business, political, nonprofit and civic professions to learn how visionary, principle-centered leadership can positively impact their community".

On October 20, 2017, Watson announced his candidacy for Colorado State Treasurer. The Denver Post's Brian Eason noted Watson's announcement "shook up the field" in the GOP Treasurer primary, and that Watson "brings fundraising clout to the race, reporting $21,550 in major donations in the six days since he officially filed for office".

Watson told the Greenwood Villager that his campaign for Treasurer would focus on his career in business and his skills, which he argued would make him well suited for the office. "'When you have somebody who understands internal rates of return and complex financial matters and how to go in and restructure debt and can save millions and millions of dollars for the people of Colorado—this is what I do every single day,' [Watson] said." In the same interview Watson also described the Colorado public pension system [Colorado Public Employee Retirement Association (PERA)] as a "ticking time bomb". Watson said his ideas to address financial shortfalls in PERA include "raising the retirement age for the state government’s younger employees and perhaps allowing workers more control over their retirement investments".

Watson reported raising $215,000 in his first fundraising quarter this year and announced he planned to petition his way onto the June primary ballot. Watson's January fundraising total dwarfed the next closest Republican candidate and was more than the next 9 candidates' fundraising totals combined.

On March 5, 2018, Watson became the first Colorado State Treasurer candidate to turn in his petition signatures to qualify for the June primary ballot. Watson announced a submission of more than 17,000 signatures to the Colorado Secretary of State's office.

== Business career ==
Watson was a manager and director at Cushman & Wakefield. In 2000, he founded Northstar Commercial Partners, a commercial real estate investment company in Denver, Colorado.

Northstar's business strategy focuses on “buying vacant or distressed assets and giving them new life” and oversees key development projects, such as senior living, healthcare, and large data center facilities for a Fortune 25 company.

Watson said he is proud of Northstar's work buying distressed real estate, arguing doing so provides benefits to communities where Northstar has a presence. "We can take something with low utility, and turn it into a highly productive environment that has a social impact. High tides raise all boats – if we can do well by doing good and give returns back to our investors and prove an asset and help achieve dreams in the community – then that's a life well lived," Watson said. Watson also said that Northstar's work building a hospital for the healthcare company Clinica will help "serve individuals who don't have healthcare access".

Mr. Watson also directs Northstar to fund community-focused initiatives. In 2017, they began raising money to help build a retail and commercial development in Aurora that could benefit veterans in close proximity to the forthcoming Aurora VA facility. The project itself will ultimately cost $120 million, and seek to not only house veterans, but also encourage retail and economic growth around the development. Jason Marcotte, Northstar's development team lead on the Aurora project, said the planned development site stands out today because it is one of the few underdeveloped stretches in that part of Aurora. "Taking this mostly vacant and distressed spot in an otherwise thriving area of town and helping place it back into productivity will create new opportunity and much needed space to live and create," Marcotte said.

In October 2014, Watson founded the "Education Opportunity Fund", a $100 million charter school facility fund

In spring 2017, Watson published The 7 Rings, a book about "life balance". In 2019, he published another book, titled Building – Lessons Learned in Life and Real Estate.

In February 2018, Watson announced Northstar Commercial Partners had purchased the "Offices at the Art" building in Denver for $17.1 million. "This will be one of the top acquisitions in the Denver market for newer office space and we're thrilled to be involved, especially with Denver as our hometown," [Watson] said in a statement.

== FBI investigation and fraud lawsuit ==
In April 2020, the FBI raided Watson's house, serving him with a search warrant, and confiscated his cell phone and computer. According to a company-wide e-mail obtained by The Denver Post, Watson alleges the raid was in relation to "fraud and misappropriation of funds and was connected to the company's work with Amazon data centers".

In a lawsuit filed in federal court in Virginia, Amazon accused Northstar Commercial Partners of "a significant fraud and kickback scheme", which likely prompted the April FBI raid of Watson's home. The lawsuit accused Northstar of racketeering and fraud, which Mr. Watson denied.

On January 30, 2026, a jury found after a five day trial that Brian Watson and his Company, Northstar Commercial Partners, are liable for intentional securities fraud. As shown by the evidence at trial, Watson and Northstar defrauded investors in 11 different offerings over the course of about 36 months. Defendants told investors that Watson “co-invested” in every real estate offering by investing his personal funds in Northstar-sponsored real estate projects alongside investors who were also investing in common equity. The statements were false and misleading because Watson did not co-invest his personal funds as promised. These repeated misstatements over time facilitated a scheme and course of business that defrauded investors.
