= Edie Hooton =

American politician from Colorado

Member of the Colorado House of Representatives from the 10th district
- In office January 11, 2017 – January 9, 2023
- Preceded by: Dickey Lee Hullinghorst
- Succeeded by: Junie Joseph

Personal details
- Party: Democratic
- Spouse: Jim Hooton
- Education: University of Pennsylvania (MPA)

Edie Hooton is a politician from Colorado, U.S. She is a former three-term Democratic member of the Colorado House of Representatives. She represented District 10, which covered a portion of Boulder County. She was first elected in 2016, succeeding Dickey Lee Hullinghorst.

In her early political career, Hooton worked as an aide to Alaska State Senator Bettye Fahrenkamp and U.S. Senator Mike Gravel. She moved to Boulder County in 1997 and served as President of the Democratic Women of Boulder County before taking office.

Hooton served on the House Energy & Environment Committee, the House Transportation & Local Government Committee, and the Capitol Development Committee.

== Elections ==
Hooton was elected to the House of Representatives in 2016; she won the Democratic primary with 51.24% of the vote against opponent Angelique Espinoza and ran unopposed in the general election. She was re-elected in 2018 and 2020, serving three full terms in the Colorado House of Representatives.

In 2022, Hooton initially ran for re-election to her District 10 state house seat. She ran unopposed in and won the Democratic primary held on June 28, 2022. However, in an undated statement released about August 1, 2022, Hooton announced she was dropping out of the race, stating "My husband Jim retired three years ago, and I want to spend more time with him and my adult children and pursue personal interests." A vacancy committee selected a replacement candidate for the November general election. Hooton served out the remainder of her third term until January 2023.

In February 2026, Hooton announced her candidacy for the Democratic nomination in the 2026 primary election to represent the University of Colorado Board of Regents in the 2nd district.

== Election history ==
=== 2016 ===
Colorado House of Representatives, District 10 Democratic Primary, 2016
Party	Candidate	Votes	%
Democratic	Edie Hooton	4,364	51.24
Democratic	Angelique Espinoza	4,152	48.76

=== 2018 ===
Colorado House of Representatives, District 10, 2018
Party	Candidate	Votes	%
Democratic	Edie Hooton	36,310	86.8
Republican	Murl Hendrickson IV	4,152	13.2

=== 2020 ===
Colorado House of Representatives, District 10, 2020
Party	Candidate	Votes	%
Democratic	Edie Hooton	39,269	85.4
Republican	Kenneth Stickney	6,733	14.6

=== 2022 ===
Colorado House of Representatives, District 10 Democratic Primary, 2022
Party	Candidate	Votes	%
Democratic	Edie Hooton	12,451	100.00
