= Colorado's 28th Senate district =

American legislative district

Colorado's 28th State Senate district
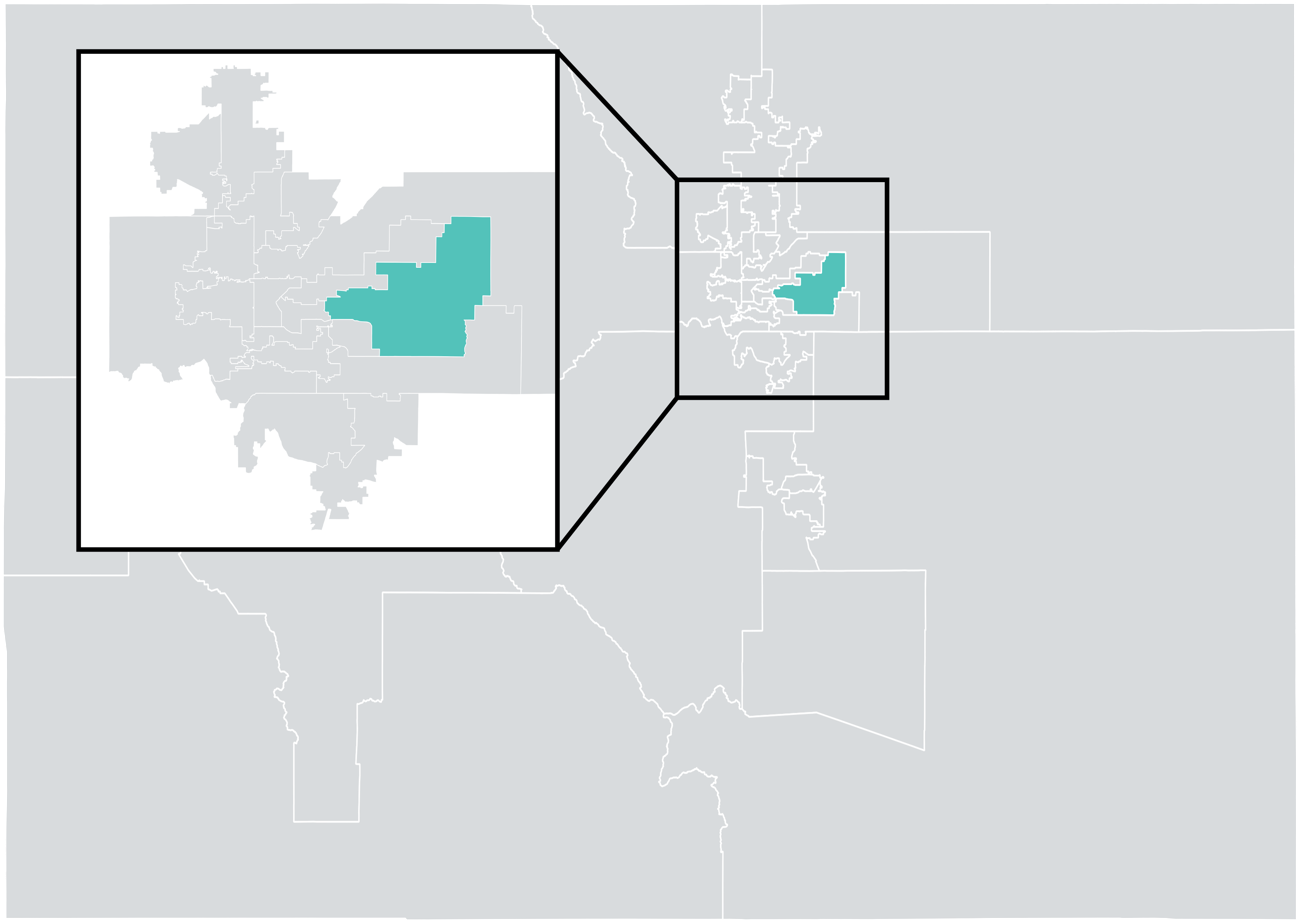
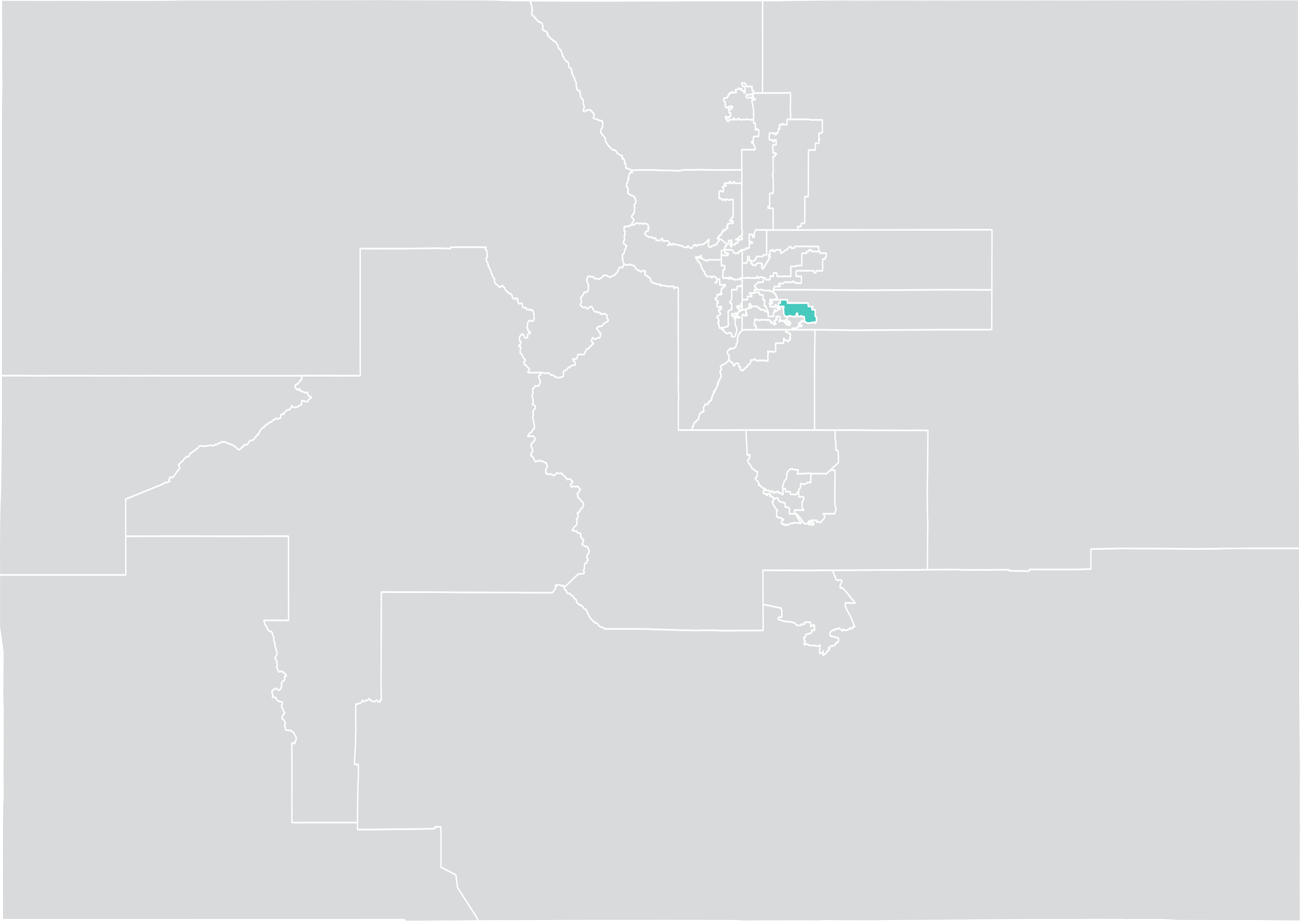
Senator
Rhonda Fields; D–Aurora
- Registration: 33.2% Democratic; 13.8% Republican; 49.9% No party preference
- Demographics: 56% White; 12% Black; 19% Hispanic; 7% Asian; 4% Other
- Population (2018): 152,909
- Registered voters: 107,942

Colorado's 28th Senate district is one of 35 districts in the Colorado Senate. It has been represented by Democrat Rhonda Fields since 2023. Prior to redistricting the district was represented by Democrats Janet Buckner and Nancy Todd.

== Geography ==
District 28 is based in southern Aurora, also covering parts of unincorporated Arapahoe County.

The district is located entirely within Colorado's 6th congressional district, and overlaps with the 36th, 40th, 41st, 42nd, and 56th districts of the Colorado House of Representatives.

== Recent election results ==
Colorado state senators are elected to staggered four-year terms; under normal circumstances, the 28th district holds elections in presidential years.

=== 2020 ===
2020 Colorado State Senate election, District 28
Party	Candidate	Votes	%
Democratic	Janet Buckner	51,028	61.9
Republican	Karl Stecher	31,387	38.1
Total votes		82,415	100
Democratic hold			

=== 2016 ===
2016 Colorado State Senate election, District 28
Party	Candidate	Votes	%
Democratic	Nancy Todd (incumbent)	39,143	55.7
Republican	James Woodley	31,096	44.3
Total votes		70,239	100
Democratic hold			

=== 2012 ===
2012 Colorado State Senate election, District 28
Primary election
Party	Candidate	Votes	%
Republican	John Lyons	3,288	62.8
Republican	Art Carlson	1,948	37.2
Total votes		5,236	100
General election
Democratic	Nancy Todd	37,181	58.0
Republican	John Lyons	24,475	38.2
Libertarian	Robert Harrison	2,459	3.8
Total votes		64,115	100
Democratic hold			

=== Federal and statewide results ===
Year	Office	Results
2020	President	Biden 61.6 – 35.6%
2018	Governor	Polis 58.7 – 37.4%
2016	President	Clinton 53.3 – 37.7%
2014	Senate	Udall 49.8 – 43.8%
2014	Governor	Hickenlooper 52.5 – 42.8%
2012	President	Obama 57.5 – 40.3%
