= Gunbarrel, Colorado =

Census-designated place in Boulder County, CO, USA

- Census-designated place
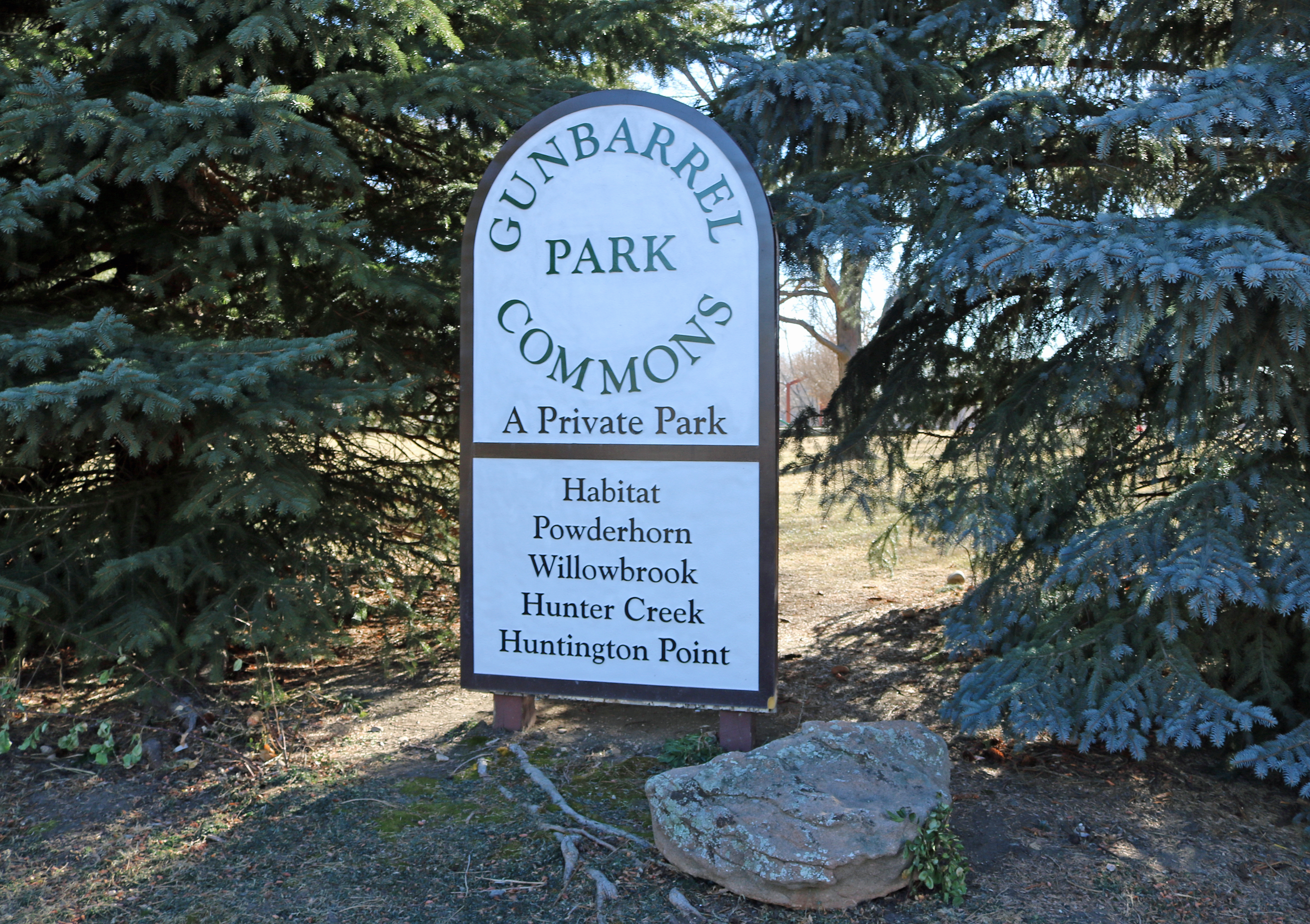
- Gunbarrel Commons Park in Gunbarrel

- Location of the Gunbarrel CDP in Boulder County, Colorado
- Coordinates: 40°03′48″N 105°10′17″W
- Country: United States
- State: Colorado
- County: Boulder County
- Founded: 1965

Government
  - Type: Unincorporated community

Area
  - Total: 6.309 sq mi (16.340 km^{2})
  - Land: 6.249 sq mi (16.185 km^{2})
  - Water: 0.060 sq mi (0.155 km^{2})
- Elevation: 5,282 ft (1,610 m)

Population (2020)
  - Total: 9,554
  - Density: 1,529/sq mi (590.3/km^{2})
- Time zone: UTC-7 (MST)
  - Summer (DST): UTC-6 (MDT)
- ZIP Code: Boulder 80301; Longmont 80503
- Area codes: 303 & 720
- GNIS feature ID: 2408343

Gunbarrel is an unincorporated community and a census-designated place (CDP) located in and governed by Boulder County, Colorado, United States. The CDP is a part of the Boulder, CO Metropolitan Statistical Area. The population of the Gunbarrel CDP was 9,554 at the 2020 United States census. The Boulder (Zip Code 80301) and Longmont (Zip Code 80503) post offices serve the area.

== Geography ==
Gunbarrel is northeast of the city of Boulder proper, separated by a buffer area of private agricultural lands and publicly owned open space. The buffer areas provide over two miles (3 km) of separation over changing elevations.

Two reservoirs operated by the Boulder and Left Hand Irrigation Company, are located in central Gunbarrel. The Twin Lakes Open Space, a large park which includes the two reservoirs and extends west along the ditch, is operated by the Boulder County Parks and Open Space Department. The park brings protected wetlands, jogging trails and green spaces directly into the urban area. The City of Boulder operates Eaton Park, adjacent to the west lake. Flood control facilities are integral to the reservoir and canal systems, but they do not eliminate the flood risk to adjacent development.

The Gunbarrel CDP has an area of 4,038 acres (16.340 km^{2}), including 38 acres (0.155 km^{2}) of water.

=== Natural hazards ===
The principal natural hazard in Gunbarrel is flooding. The county Transportation Department provides floodplain information through an online request page, free of charge for property owners in the unincorporated areas of the county. Boulder County participates in the National Flood Insurance Program which allows some reduction in the cost of flood insurance for residents.

=== Climate ===
Climate data for Gunbarrel, Colorado
| Month | Jan | Feb | Mar | Apr | May | Jun | Jul | Aug | Sep | Oct | Nov | Dec | Year |
|---|---|---|---|---|---|---|---|---|---|---|---|---|---|
| Mean daily maximum °F (°C) | 46 (8) | 49 (9) | 56 (13) | 63 (17) | 72 (22) | 81 (27) | 86 (30) | 85 (29) | 77 (25) | 65 (18) | 54 (12) | 46 (8) | 65 (18) |
| Mean daily minimum °F (°C) | 22 (−6) | 23 (−5) | 29 (−2) | 36 (2) | 44 (7) | 51 (11) | 56 (13) | 55 (13) | 47 (8) | 38 (3) | 28 (−2) | 22 (−6) | 38 (3) |
Source: Accuweather

== Demographics ==
The United States Census Bureau initially defined the Gunbarrel CDP for the 1980 United States census.

Gunbarrel CDP, Colorado
| Year | Pop. | ±% |
|---|---|---|
| 1980 | 5,172 | — |
| 1990 | 9,388 | +81.5% |
| 2000 | 9,435 | +0.5% |
| 2010 | 9,263 | −1.8% |
| 2020 | 9,554 | +3.1% |
Source: United States Census Bureau

=== 2020 census ===
As of the 2020 census, Gunbarrel had a population of 9,554. The median age was 43.2 years. 15.2% of residents were under the age of 18 and 20.6% of residents were 65 years of age or older. For every 100 females there were 103.0 males, and for every 100 females age 18 and over there were 101.8 males age 18 and over.

94.8% of residents lived in urban areas, while 5.2% lived in rural areas.

There were 4,398 households in Gunbarrel, of which 19.6% had children under the age of 18 living in them. Of all households, 46.7% were married-couple households, 21.3% were households with a male householder and no spouse or partner present, and 23.4% were households with a female householder and no spouse or partner present. About 29.6% of all households were made up of individuals and 11.2% had someone living alone who was 65 years of age or older.

There were 4,594 housing units, of which 4.3% were vacant. The homeowner vacancy rate was 1.2% and the rental vacancy rate was 4.0%.

Racial composition as of the 2020 census
| Race | Number | Percent |
|---|---|---|
| White | 8,160 | 85.4% |
| Black or African American | 89 | 0.9% |
| American Indian and Alaska Native | 24 | 0.3% |
| Asian | 312 | 3.3% |
| Native Hawaiian and Other Pacific Islander | 1 | 0.0% |
| Some other race | 146 | 1.5% |
| Two or more races | 822 | 8.6% |
| Hispanic or Latino (of any race) | 584 | 6.1% |

== Government ==
The Gunbarrel Public Improvement District (GPID), formerly the Gunbarrel General Improvement District, was formed by residents of Gunbarrel in 1993. At the time, county residents were concerned about the negative effects of development in the adjacent neighborhoods of the city of Boulder. They felt they needed to counterbalance the city's annexation and development powers and better manage the traffic city development was creating. The GPID is administered by the Boulder County commissioners. The GPID is a 'special district' under Colorado law, with the ability to levy taxes and incur debt. GPID uses this money to purchase open space and improve roads in the unincorporated subdivisions, consistent with their primary mission of maintaining quality of life and property values in unincorporated Gunbarrel. GPID open space lands are managed by Boulder County Parks and Open Space. A map of GPID lands can be found at the Gunbarrel Community Association website. This map also depicts the boundaries of the District's taxation area.

== Transportation ==
The 205 bus of the RTD bus system gives service throughout Gunbarrel and into Boulder. Roads and streets in Gunbarrel are maintained by Boulder County.

The RTD regional route J also provides a peak hours connection to the University of Colorado and Longmont. It is intended that, once built to its planned full extent, the RTD B Line will have a station in Gunbarrel.

== See also ==
- Boulder, CO Metropolitan Statistical Area
