= Colorado State Treasurer =

Government office

Treasurer of the State of Colorado
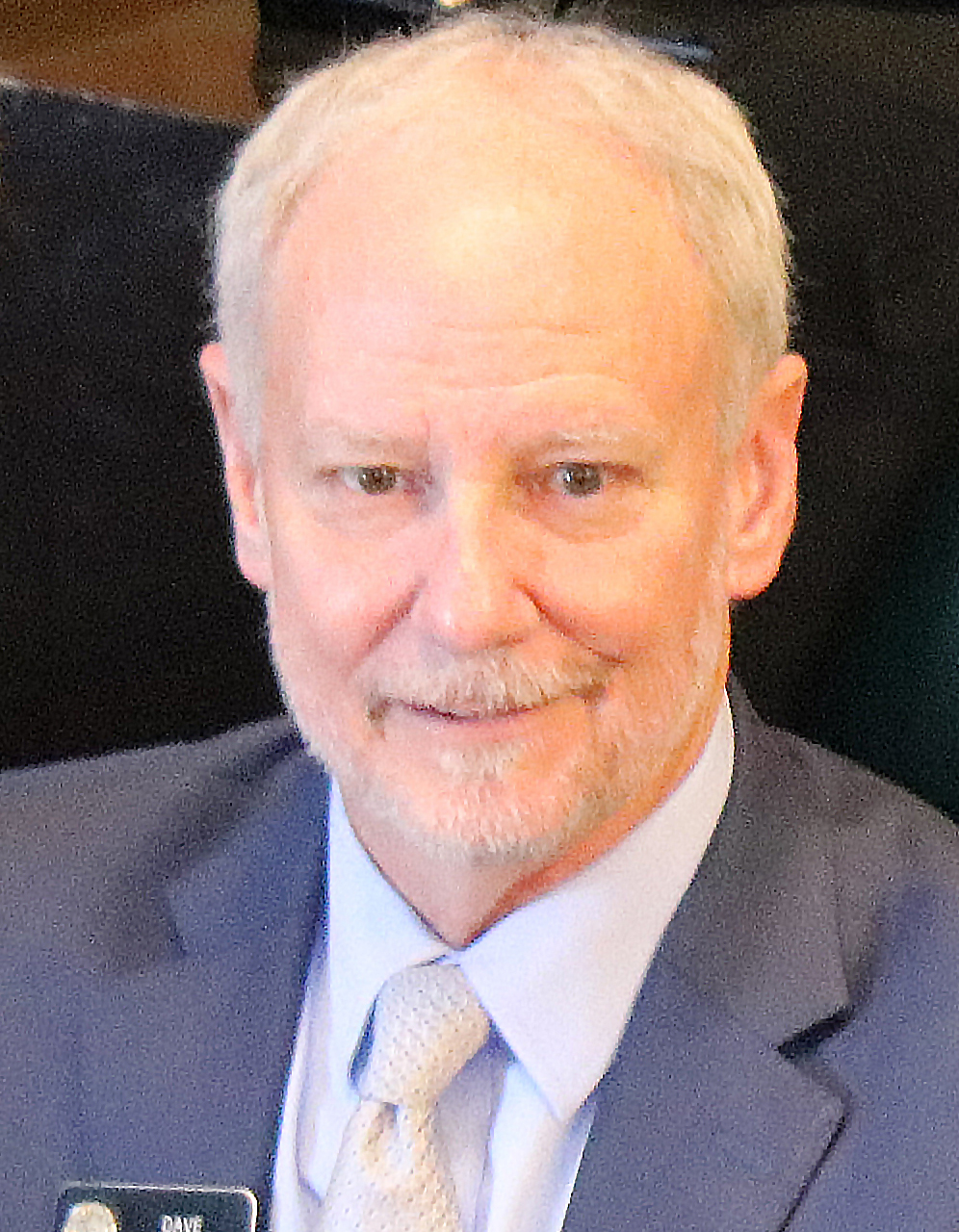
- Incumbent; Dave Young since January 8, 2019
- Colorado Department of the Treasury
- Term length: Four years
- Website: www.colorado.gov/treasury/

The Treasurer of the State of Colorado is an elected official in the U.S. state of Colorado. The position is responsible for managing the Colorado State Treasury and the Colorado Department of the Treasury, a principal department of the state's government. The Treasury currently manages a pool of investments worth about $6 billion.

The position is one of five officials elected statewide in Colorado, along with the positions of governor, lieutenant governor, secretary of state and attorney general. Elections for the position are held during midterm election years for a four year term, with the most recent election being held in 2022.

The current Colorado state treasurer is Dave Young, a Democrat first elected in 2018 for a four-year term beginning on January 8, 2019. He was reelected to the position in 2022 for another four-year term.

== List of treasurers ==
=== Treasurer of the Territory of Colorado ===
No.	Image	Treasurer	Political party	Term of Service
1		George T. Clark	Appointed by the Governor of Colorado Territory	1861–1864
2		Alexander W. Atkins	Appointed by the Governor of Colorado Territory	1864–1866
3		Alexander Cameron Hunt	Appointed by the Governor of Colorado Territory	1866
4		John Wanless	Appointed by the Governor of Colorado Territory	1866–1867
5		Columbus Nuckolls	Appointed by the Governor of Colorado Territory	1867–1870
6		George T. Clark	Appointed by the Governor of Colorado Territory	1870–1874
7		David H. Moffat	Appointed by the Governor of Colorado Territory	1874–1876
8		Frederick Z. Solomon	Appointed by the Governor of Colorado Territory	1876

=== Treasurer of the State of Colorado ===
No.	Image	Treasurer	Political party	Term of Service
1		George C. Corning		1876–1879
2		Nathan C. Culver		1879–1880
3		W. C. Sanders		1881–1882
4		Fred Walsen		1883–1884
5		George R. Swallow		1885–1886
6		Peter W. Breene		1887–1888
7		William Brisbane		1889–1890
8		James N. Carlile		1891–1892
9		Albert Nance		1893–1894
10		Harry E. Mulnix		1895–1896
11		George W. Kephart		1897–1898
12		John H. Fesler		1899–1900
13		James N. Chipley		1901–1902
14		Whitney Newton		1903–1904
15		John A. Holmbert		1905–1906
16		Alfred E. Bent		1907–1908
17		W. J. Galligan		1909–1910
18		Roady Kenehan	Democratic	1911–1912
19		M. A. Leddy		1913–1914
20		Allison Stocker		1915–1916
21		Robert H. Higgins		1917–1918
22		Harry E. Mulnix		1919–1920
23		Arthur Strong		1921–1922
24		Harry E. Mulnix		1923–1924
25		W. D. MacGinnis		1925–1926
26		Harry E. Mulnix		1927
27		Herbert Fairall		1928
28		W. D. MacGinnis		1929–1930
29		John M. Jackson		1931–1932
30		Homer Bedford	Democratic	1933–1934
31		Charles Armstrong	Republican	1935–1936
32		Homer Bedford	Democratic	1937–1938
33		Charles Armstrong	Republican	1939–1940
34		Homer Bedford	Democratic	1941–1942
35		Leon Lavington	Republican	1943–1944
36		Homer Bedford	Democratic	1945–1946
37		Rodney Anderson	Republican	1947–1948
38		Homer Bedford	Democratic	1949–1950
39		Earl E. Ewing	Republican	1951–1952
40		Homer Bedford	Democratic	1953–1954
41		Earl E. Ewing	Republican	1955–1956
42		Homer Bedford	Democratic	1957–1958
43		Tim Armstrong	Democratic	1959–1962
44		Homer Bedford	Democratic	1963–1966
45		Virginia Blue	Republican	1967–1970
46		Julia Swearingen	Republican	1970
47		Palmer Burch	Republican	1971–1974
48		Sam Brown	Democratic	1975–1977
49		Roy Romer	Democratic	1977–1987
50		Gail Schoettler	Democratic	1987–1995
51		Bill Owens	Republican	1995–1999
52		Mike Coffman	Republican	1999–2005
53		Mark Hillman	Republican	2005–2006
54		Mike Coffman	Republican	2006–2007
55		Cary Kennedy	Democratic	2007–2011
56		Walker Stapleton	Republican	2011–2019
57		Dave Young	Democratic	2019–present

== See also ==
- Colorado
- Government of Colorado
