= List of people from Aurora, Colorado =

Coordinates: 39.7294°N 104.8319°W

Location of Aurora in Colorado

This is a list of some notable people who have lived in the City of Aurora, Colorado, United States.

== Academia ==
- Robert Michael Pyle (1947– ), lepidopterist
- Paul Stewart (1925–2015), historian

== Arts and entertainment ==
=== Film, television, and theatre ===
- Zachery Ty Bryan (1981– ), actor
- Madhuri Dixit (1967– ), actress
- Maggie Flecknoe (1983– ), voice actress, radio personality
- Neil Hopkins (1977– ), actor
- Chloe Johnson (1989– ), beauty queen
- Jennifer Ketcham (1983– ), pornographic actress, blogger
- Brandon Quinn (1977– ), actor
- Bert V. Royal (1977– ), screenwriter
- Britt Stewart (2008– ), actress, choreographer, dancer
- Dan Soder (1983– ), comedian
- Bowen Yang (1990– ), comedian, cast member of Saturday Night Live
- Connor Storrie (2000– ), actor

=== Gaming ===
- Jon Shafer (1985– ), game designer, producer

=== Journalism ===
- Stan Romanek (1962– ), author and UFO proponent
- David Von Drehle (1961– ), editor, reporter

=== Literature ===
- Paul G. Tremblay (1971– ), editor, novelist, short story writer

=== Music ===
- Foolish Things, Christian rock band
- Tia Fuller (1976– ), saxophonist
- Senim Silla (1977– ), rapper
- Tyler Ward (1988– ), singer-songwriter

=== Other visual arts ===
- J. Scott Campbell (1973– ), comic book artist

== Business ==
- James C. Collins (1958– ), business consultant, author, and lecturer
- Donald Fletcher (1849–1929), real estate tycoon, Aurora city co-founder
- Caroline Glover, chef

== Crime ==
- Gerald Foos, voyeur
- James Holmes (1987– ), mass murderer
- David Lane (1938–2007), racketeer, white supremacist
- Najibullah Zazi (1985– ), terrorist

=== Law enforcement ===
- Dan Oates (1955– ), police chief

=== Victims ===
- Elijah McClain (1996–2019), massage therapist who died in police custody

== Military ==
- Danny Dietz (1980–2005), U.S. Navy SEAL slain in Operation Red Wings and recipient of the Navy Cross and Purple Heart awards
- Michelle J. Howard (1960– ), U.S. Navy admiral

== Politics ==
=== National ===
- Katherine Archuleta (1949– ), U.S. Office of Personnel Management director
- William L. Armstrong (1937–2016), U.S. senator from Colorado
- Lauren Boebert (1986– ), U.S. representative for Colorado's 3rd congressional district
- Michael D. Brown (1954– ), Federal Emergency Management Agency administrator
- Mike Coffman (1955– ), U.S. representative from Colorado and mayor of Aurora
- Jason Crow (1979–), U.S. representative for Colorado's 6th congressional district
- Gabe Evans (1986– ), U.S. representative for Colorado
- John Kerry (1943– ), U.S. senator from Massachusetts, 68th U.S. Secretary of State
- Joe Neguse (1984– ), U.S. representative for Colorado's 2nd congressional district

=== State ===
- John Buckner (1947–2015), Colorado state legislator
- Morgan Carroll (1971– ), Colorado state legislator
- Michael Carter, Colorado state legislator
- Rhonda Fields (1952– ), Colorado state legislator
- Michael Garcia (1974– ), Colorado state legislator
- Bob Hagedorn (1952– ), Colorado state legislator
- Karen Middleton (1966– ), Colorado state legislator
- Jane Norton (1954– ), 46th lieutenant governor of Colorado
- Bill Owens (1952– ), 40th governor of Colorado
- Bill Ritter (1956– ), 41st governor of Colorado
- Su Ryden (1945– ), Colorado state legislator
- Frank Weddig (1944–2012), Colorado state legislator

=== Local ===
- Steve Hogan (1948–2018), former mayor of Aurora
- Paul Tauer (1936–2022), former mayor of Aurora

== Religion ==
- Daniel Kucera (1923–2017), Roman Catholic bishop

== Sports ==
=== American football ===
- Scott Bentley (1974– ), placekicker
- Dwayne Carswell (1972– ), offensive lineman, tight end
- Larry Coyer (1943–2023), coach
- T.J. Cunningham (1972–2019), safety
- Freddy Glick (1937– ), safety
- Craig Johnson (1960– ), coach
- Brian Kelly (1976– ), cornerback
- Derrick Martin (1985– ), safety
- Aaron Moorehead (1980– ), wide receiver, coach
- Sean Moran (1973– ), defensive end
- Aaron Robbins (1983– ), linebacker
- Paul Smith (1945–2000), defensive end
- Billy Thompson (1946– ), defensive back
- Sean Tufts (1982– ), linebacker
- Chase Vaughn (1988– ), outside linebacker
- Louis Wright (1953– ), cornerback
- Mike McDaniel (1983– ), coach

=== Baseball ===
- Greg Bird (1992– ), first baseman
- Brian Fisher (1962– ), pitcher
- Brian Givens (1965– ), pitcher
- Danny Jackson (1962– ), pitcher

=== Basketball ===
- Michaela Onyenwere (1999– ), forward
- Colbey Ross (1998– ), point guard

=== Boxing ===
- Frank Peña (1971–2000), featherweight
- DaVarryl Williamson (1968– ), heavyweight

=== Martial arts ===
- Michael Chiesa (1987– ), mixed martial arts fighter
- Nate Marquardt (1979– ), mixed martial arts fighter
- Brendan Schaub (1983– ), mixed martial arts fighter
- Tyler Toner (1983– ), mixed martial arts fighter
- Michelle Waterson (1986– ), mixed martial arts fighter

=== Soccer ===
- Davy Armstrong (1991– ), midfielder
- Ian Cerro (1996– ), midfielder
- Taylor Hunter (1993– ), defender
- Matt Jordan (1975– ), goalkeeper
- Michelle Lomnicki (1987– ), defender
- Brian Mullan (1978– ), midfielder
- Aaron Pitchkolan (1983– ), defender, midfielder
- Zac Portillos (1992– ), defender
- Sterling Wescott (1972– ), midfielder
- Kacey White (1984– ), midfielder

=== Track and field ===
- Kevin Eastler (1977– ), race walker
- Jack Greenwood (1926–2015), hurdler

=== Other ===
- Mike Burke (1974– ), strongman
- Ethen Frank (b. 1998), ice hockey player
- Eddie Gill (1978– ), basketball point guard
- John Grahame (1975– ), ice hockey goaltender
- Hashim Khan (1914–2014), squash player
- Jordan Mattern (1993– ), swimmer
- Jordyn Poulter (1997– ), U.S. Olympic gold medalist volleyball player
- Taylor Ritzel (1988– ), U.S. Olympic rower
- Tiffany Vise (1986– ), ice skater

== See also ==
- List of people from Colorado
- Bibliography of Colorado
- Geography of Colorado
- History of Colorado
- Index of Colorado-related articles
- List of Colorado-related lists
- Outline of Colorado
