= 2016 United States House of Representatives elections in Colorado =

- November 8, 2016

All 7 Colorado seats to the United States House of Representatives
	Majority party	Minority party	Third party
Party	Republican	Democratic	Libertarian
Last election	4	3	0
Seats won	4	3	0
Seat change	Steady	Steady	Steady
Popular vote	1,288,618	1,263,791	143,338
Percentage	47.70%	46.78%	5.25%
Swing	▼2.30%	▼0.03%	▲3.56%

Republican
40–50%
50–60%
60–70%
70–80%
80–90%
Democratic
40–50%
50–60%
60–70%
70–80%

The 2016 United States House of Representatives elections in Colorado were held on November 8, 2016, to elect the seven U.S. representatives from the state of Colorado, one from each of the state's seven congressional districts. The elections coincided with the 2016 U.S. presidential election, as well as other elections to the House of Representatives, elections to the United States Senate and various state and local elections. The primaries were held on June 28.

As of 2026, this is the last time the Republicans won the popular vote or a majority of House seats in Colorado.

== Overview ==
=== Statewide ===
Party	Candidates	Votes		Seats		
Party	Candidates	No.	%	No.	+/–	%
Republican	7	1,288,618	47.70	4	Steady	57.14
Democratic	7	1,263,791	46.78	3	Steady	42.95
Libertarian	7	143,338	5.25	0	Steady	0.0
Green	1	5,641	0.21	0	Steady	0.0
Total	22	2,701,388	100.0	7	Steady	100.0

Popular vote
Republican	47.70%
Democratic	46.78%
Libertarian	5.25%
Green	0.21%

House seats
Republican	57.14%
Democratic	42.86%

=== By district ===
Results of the 2016 United States House of Representatives elections in Colorado by district:

District	Republican		Democratic		Libertarian		Green		Total		Result
District	Votes	%	Votes	%	Votes	%	Votes	%	Votes	%	Result
District 1	105,030	27.71%	257,254	67.87%	16,752	4.42%	0	0.00%	379,036	100.0%	Democratic hold
District 2	170,001	37.17%	260,175	56.89%	27,136	5.93%	0	0.00%	457,312	100.0%	Democratic hold
District 3	204,220	54.60%	150,914	40.35%	18,903	5.05%	0	0.00%	374,037	100.0%	Republican hold
District 4	248,230	63.55%	123,642	31.65%	18,761	4.80%	0	0.00%	390,633	100.0%	Republican hold
District 5	225,445	62.28%	111,676	30.85%	24,872	6.87%	0	0.00%	361,993	100.0%	Republican hold
District 6	191,626	50.91%	160,372	42.60%	18,778	4.99%	5,641	1.50%	376,417	100.0%	Republican hold
District 7	144,066	39.80%	199,758	55.18%	18,186	5.02%	0	0.00%	362,010	100.0%	Democratic hold
Total	1,288,618	47.70%	1,263,791	46.78%	143,338	5.31%	5,641	0.21%	2,701,388	100.0%	

== District 1 ==
2016 Colorado's 1st congressional district election
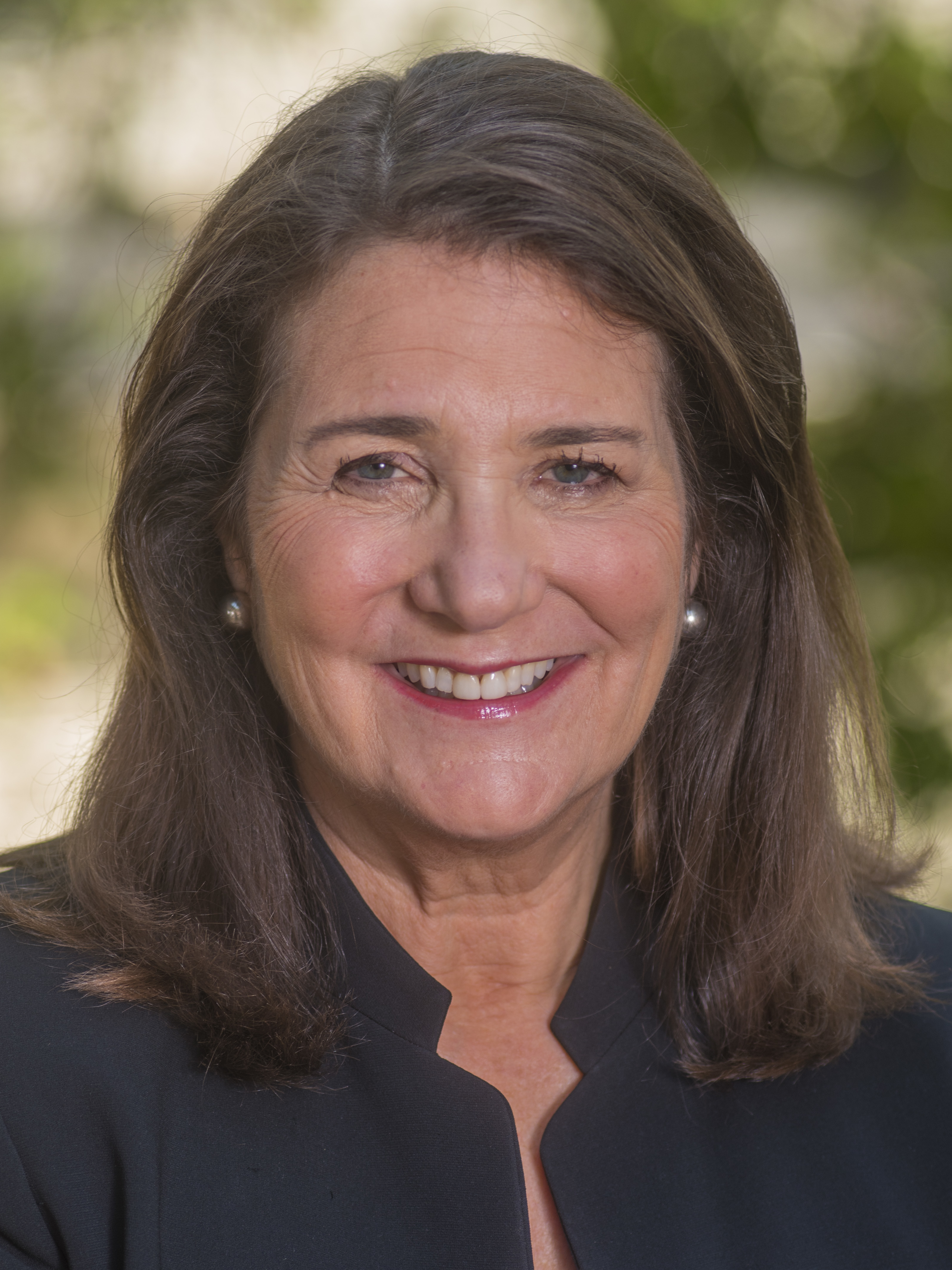

Nominee	Diana DeGette	Casper Stockham
Party	Democratic	Republican
Popular vote	257,254	105,030
Percentage	67.9%	27.7%
- DeGette: 40–50% 50–60% 60–70% 70–80% 80–90% >90% Stockham: 40–50% 50–60% 60–70% No votes
U.S. Representative before election
Diana DeGette
Democratic
Elected U.S. Representative
Diana DeGette
Democratic

The 1st district is located in Central Colorado and includes most of the city of Denver. The incumbent was Democrat Diana DeGette, who had represented the district since 1997. She was re-elected with 66% of the vote in 2014. The district had a PVI of D+18.

=== Democratic primary ===
==== Candidates ====
===== Nominee =====
- Diana DeGette, incumbent U.S. representative

===== Eliminated in primary =====
- Charles H. "Chuck" Norris

==== Results ====
Democratic primary results
Party	Candidate	Votes	%
Democratic	Diana DeGette (incumbent)	55,925	86.4
Democratic	Charles H. "Chuck" Norris	8,770	13.6
Total votes		64,065	100.0

=== Republican primary ===
==== Candidates ====
===== Nominee =====
- Charles "Casper" Stockham

==== Results ====
Republican primary results
Party	Candidate	Votes	%
Republican	Charles "Casper" Stockham	15,616	100.0

=== Libertarian primary ===
==== Candidates ====
===== Nominee =====
- Darrell Dinges

=== General election ===
==== Predictions ====
Source	Ranking	As of
The Cook Political Report	Safe D	November 7, 2016
Daily Kos Elections	Safe D	November 7, 2016
Rothenberg	Safe D	November 3, 2016
Sabato's Crystal Ball	Safe D	November 7, 2016
RCP	Safe D	October 31, 2016

==== Results ====
Colorado's 1st congressional district, 2016
Party	Candidate	Votes	%
Democratic	Diana DeGette (incumbent)	257,254	67.9
Republican	Charles "Casper" Stockham	105,030	27.7
Libertarian	Darrell Dinges	16,752	4.4
Total votes		379,036	100.0
Democratic hold			

== District 2 ==
2016 Colorado's 2nd congressional district election
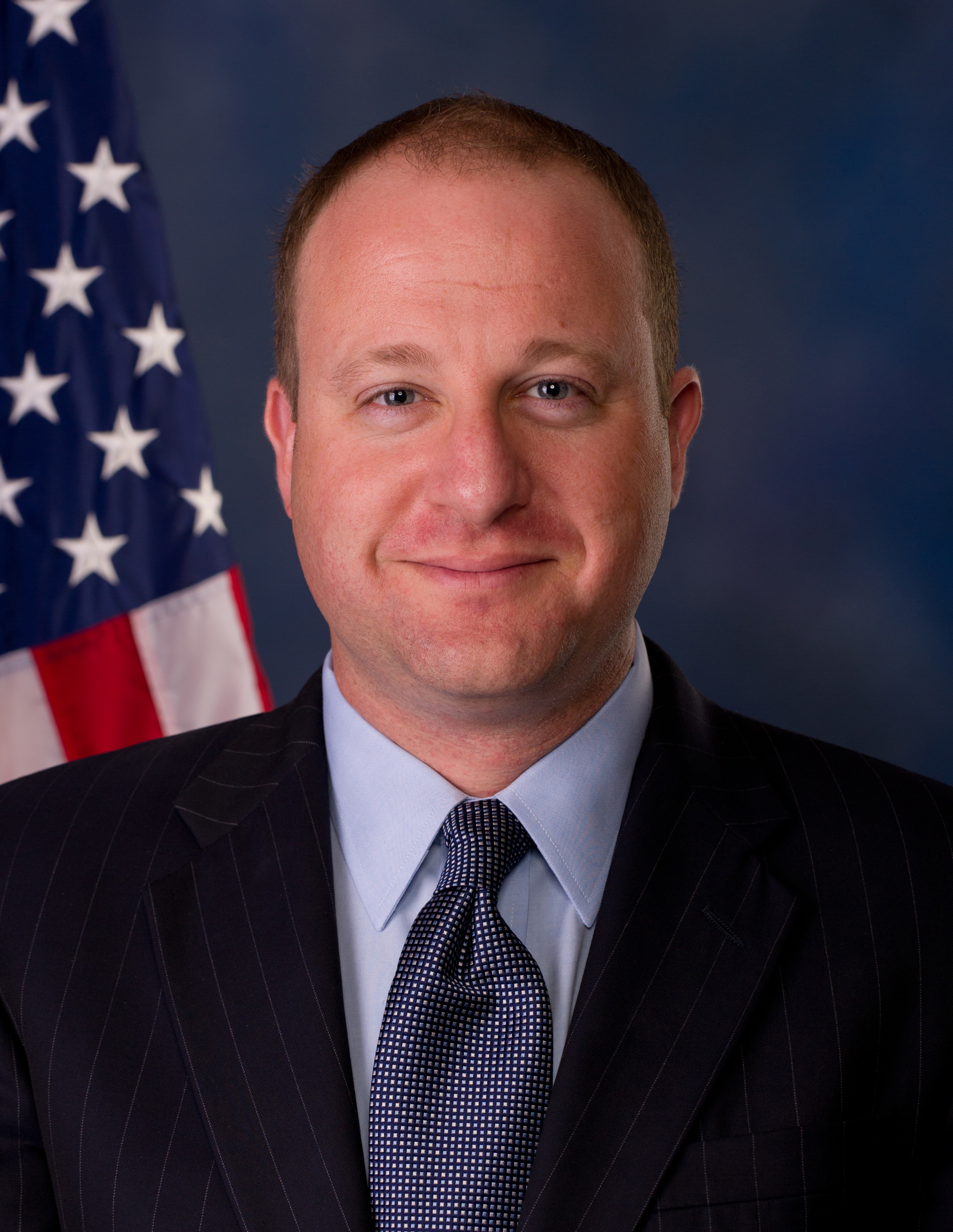

Nominee	Jared Polis	Nicholas Morse	Richard Longstreth
Party	Democratic	Republican	Libertarian
Popular vote	260,175	170,001	27,136
Percentage	56.9%	37.2%	5.9%
- Polis: 40–50% 50–60% 60–70% 70–80% 80–90% Morse: 40–50% 50–60% 60–70% 70–80% Tie: 40–50%
U.S. Representative before election
Jared Polis
Democratic
Elected U.S. Representative
Jared Polis
Democratic

The 2nd district is located in Northern Colorado and encompasses seven counties. The incumbent was Democrat Jared Polis, who had represented the district since 2009. He was re-elected with 56% of the vote in 2014 and was not expected to have a primary challenger.

=== Democratic primary ===
==== Candidates ====
===== Nominee =====
- Jared Polis, incumbent U.S. representative

==== Results ====
Democratic primary results
Party	Candidate	Votes	%
Democratic	Jared Polis (incumbent)	43,660	100.0

=== Republican primary ===
==== Candidates ====
===== Nominee =====
- Nicholas Morse, marketing executive

==== Results ====
Republican primary results
Party	Candidate	Votes	%
Republican	Nicholas Morse	36,417	100.0

=== Libertarian primary ===
==== Candidates ====
===== Nominee =====
- Richard Longstreth

=== General election ===
==== Predictions ====
Source	Ranking	As of
The Cook Political Report	Safe D	November 7, 2016
Daily Kos Elections	Safe D	November 7, 2016
Rothenberg	Safe D	November 3, 2016
Sabato's Crystal Ball	Safe D	November 7, 2016
RCP	Safe D	October 31, 2016

==== Results ====
Colorado's 2nd congressional district, 2016
Party	Candidate	Votes	%
Democratic	Jared Polis (incumbent)	260,175	56.9
Republican	Nicholas Morse	170,001	37.2
Libertarian	Richard Longstreth	27,136	5.9
Total votes		457,312	100.0
Democratic hold			

== District 3 ==
2016 Colorado's 3rd congressional district election
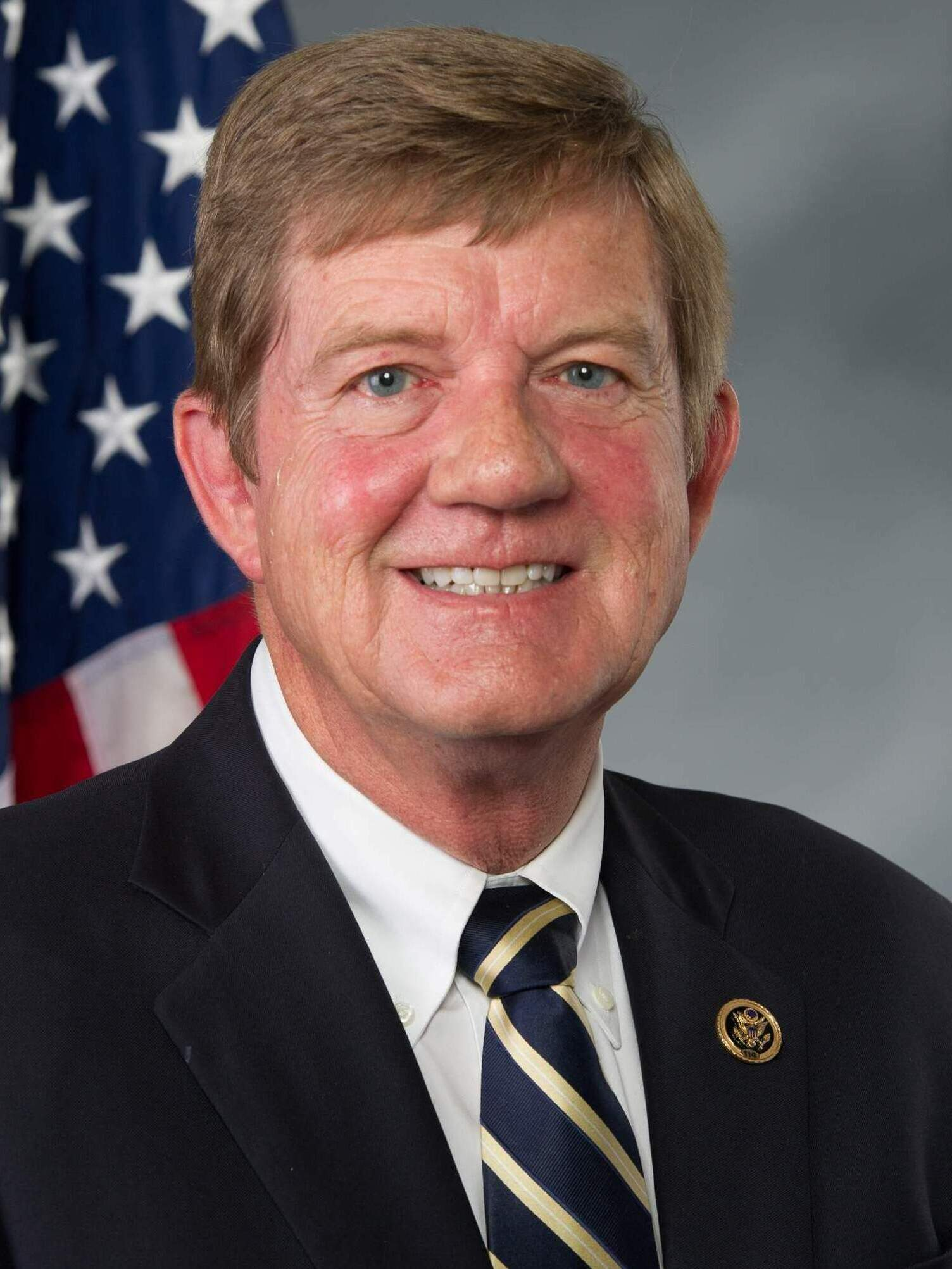

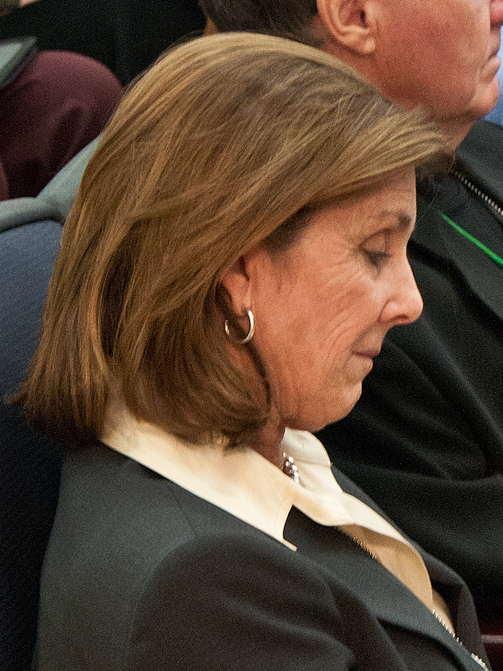

Nominee	Scott Tipton	Gail Schwartz	Gaylon Kent
Party	Republican	Democratic	Libertarian
Popular vote	204,220	150,914	18,903
Percentage	54.6%	40.4%	5.0%
- Tipton: 40–50% 50–60% 60–70% 70–80% 80–90% >90% Schwartz: 40–50% 50–60% 60–70% 70–80% 80–90% >90%
U.S. Representative before election
Scott Tipton
Republican
Elected U.S. Representative
Scott Tipton
Republican

The 3rd district is located in Western and Southern Colorado and includes a large number of sparsely populated counties and the city of Grand Junction. The incumbent was Republican Scott Tipton, who had represented the district since 2011. He was re-elected with 58% of the vote in 2014. The district had a PVI of R+5.

Tipton was mentioned as a potential candidate for the U.S. Senate, but announced that he would run for re-election instead.

=== Republican primary ===
==== Candidates ====
===== Nominee =====
- Scott Tipton, incumbent U.S. representative

===== Eliminated in primary =====
- Alexander Beinstein

==== Results ====
Republican primary results
Party	Candidate	Votes	%
Republican	Scott Tipton (incumbent)	43,992	78.9
Republican	Alexander Beinstein	11,790	21.1
Total votes		55,782	100.0

=== Democratic primary ===
==== Candidates ====
===== Nominee =====
- Gail Schwartz, state senator from the 5th district

==== Results ====
Democratic primary results
Party	Candidate	Votes	%
Democratic	Gail Schwartz	35,823	100.0

=== General election ===
==== Endorsements ====
Gail Schwartz (D)

Organizations

- EMILY's List

==== Predictions ====
Source	Ranking	As of
The Cook Political Report	Likely R	November 7, 2016
Daily Kos Elections	Lean R	November 7, 2016
Rothenberg	Safe R	November 3, 2016
Sabato's Crystal Ball	Likely R	November 7, 2016
RCP	Likely R	October 31, 2016

==== Results ====
Colorado's 3rd congressional district, 2016
Party	Candidate	Votes	%
Republican	Scott Tipton (incumbent)	204,220	54.6
Democratic	Gail Schwartz	150,914	40.4
Libertarian	Gaylon Kent	18,903	5.0
Total votes		374,037	100.0
Republican hold			

== District 4 ==
2016 Colorado's 4th congressional district election
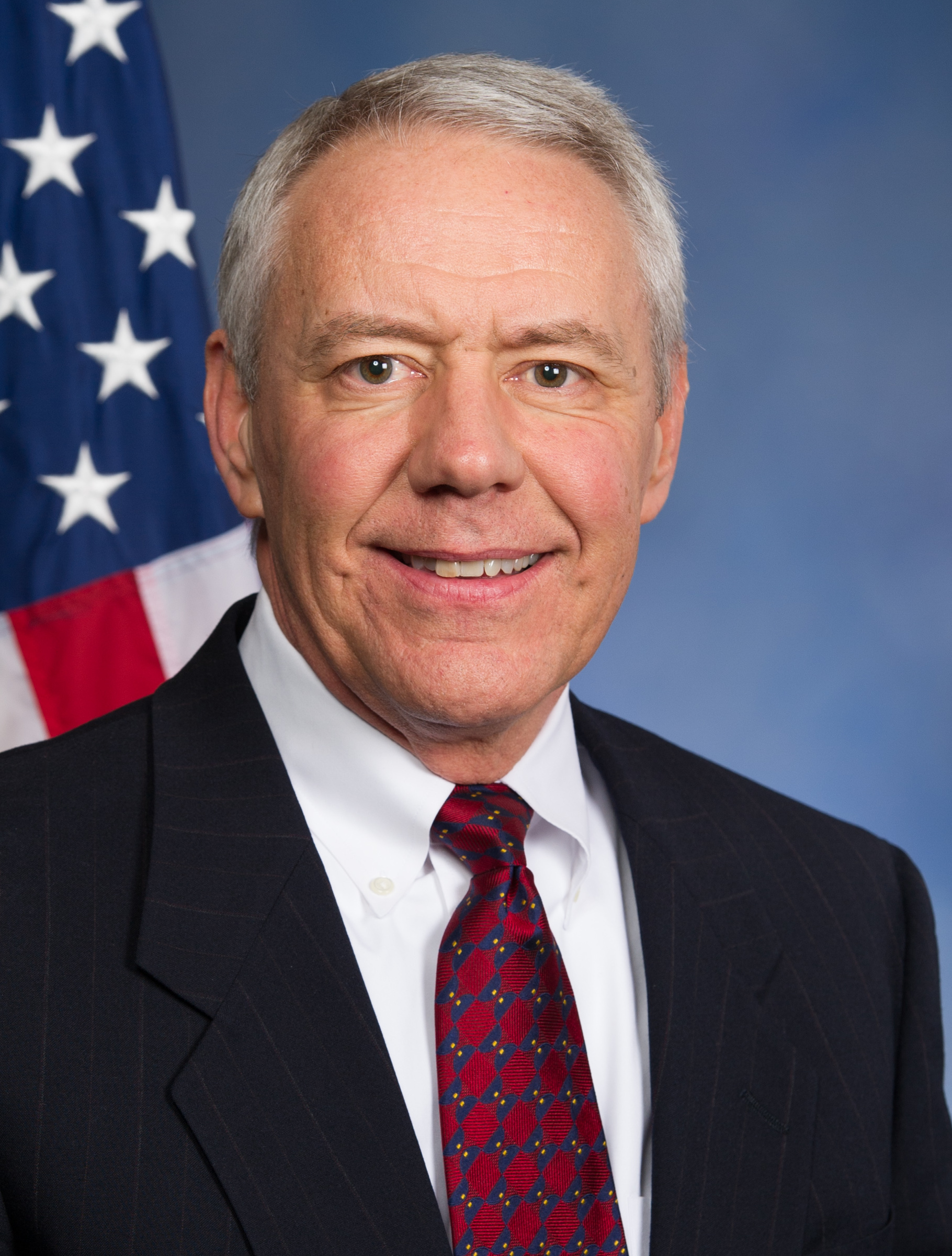

Nominee	Ken Buck	Bob Seay
Party	Republican	Democratic
Popular vote	248,230	123,642
Percentage	63.5%	31.7%
- Buck: 40–50% 50–60% 60–70% 70–80% 80–90% >90% Seay: 40–50% 50–60% 60–70% 70–80% Tie: 40–50% No votes
U.S. Representative before election
Ken Buck
Republican
Elected U.S. Representative
Ken Buck
Republican

The 4th district is located in Eastern Colorado and includes numerous sparsely populated counties. The incumbent was Republican Ken Buck, who had represented the district since 2015. He was elected with 65% of the vote in 2014. The district had a PVI of R+11.

=== Republican primary ===
==== Candidates ====
Declared

- Ken Buck, incumbent U.S. representative

==== Results ====
Republican primary results
Party	Candidate	Votes	%
Republican	Ken Buck (incumbent)	58,848	100.0

=== Democratic primary ===
==== Candidates ====
===== Nominee =====
- Bob Seay

==== Results ====
Democratic primary results
Party	Candidate	Votes	%
Democratic	Bob Seay	22,520	100.0

=== General election ===
==== Predictions ====
Source	Ranking	As of
The Cook Political Report	Safe R	November 7, 2016
Daily Kos Elections	Safe R	November 7, 2016
Rothenberg	Safe R	November 3, 2016
Sabato's Crystal Ball	Safe R	November 7, 2016
RCP	Safe R	October 31, 2016

==== Results ====
Colorado's 4th congressional district, 2016
Party	Candidate	Votes	%
Republican	Ken Buck (incumbent)	248,230	63.5
Democratic	Bob Seay	123,642	31.7
Libertarian	Bruce Griffith	18,761	4.8
Total votes		390,633	100.0
Republican hold			

== District 5 ==
2016 Colorado's 5th congressional district election
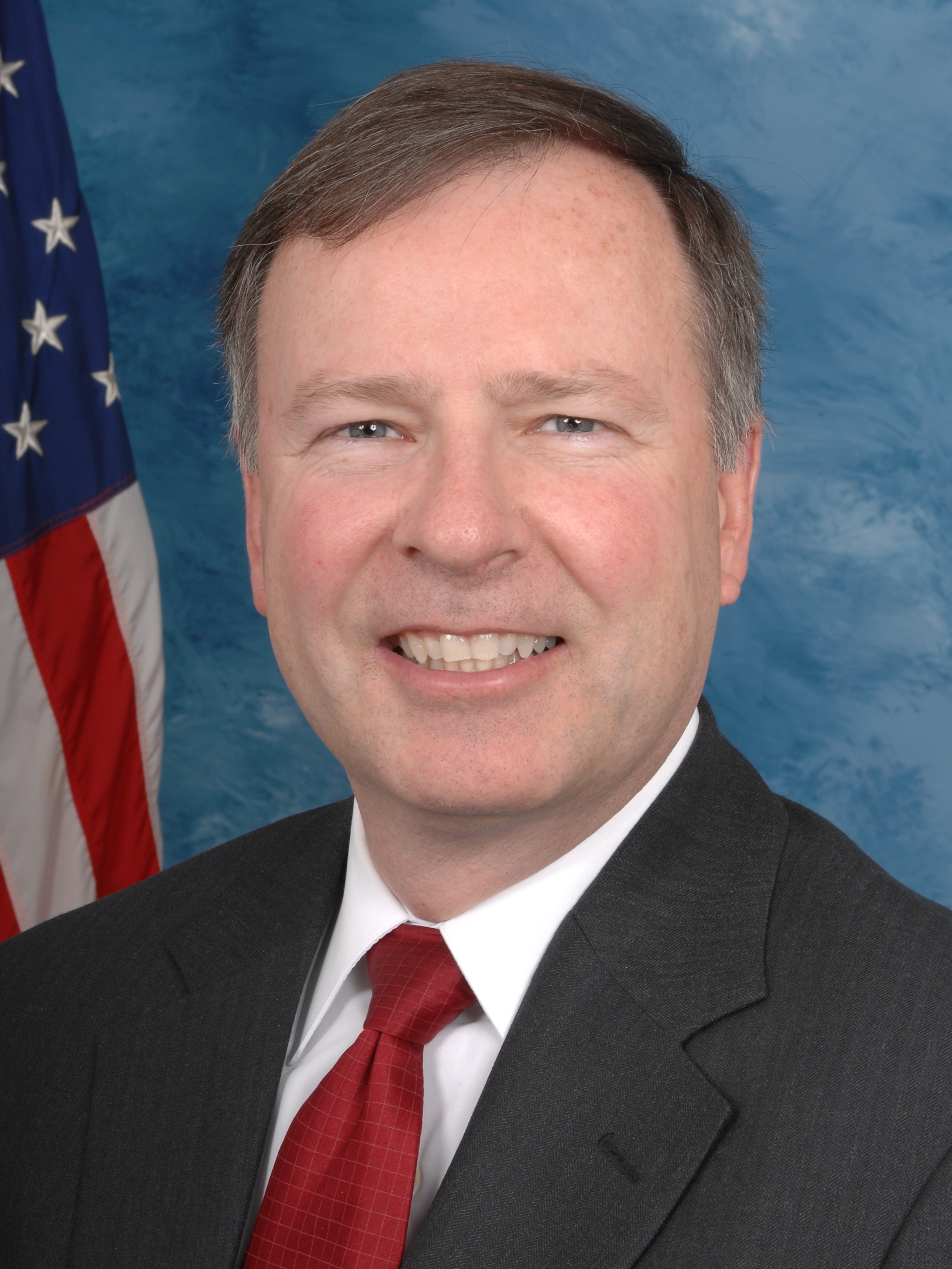

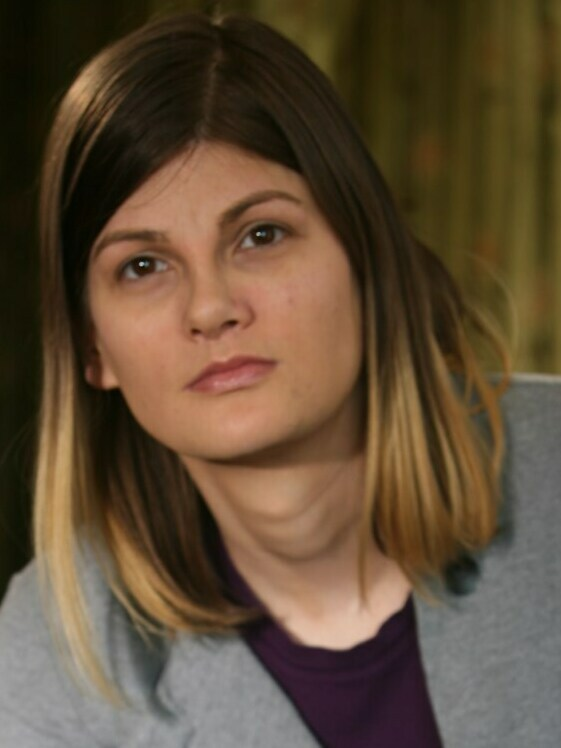

Nominee	Doug Lamborn	Misty Plowright	Mike McRedmond
Party	Republican	Democratic	Libertarian
Popular vote	225,445	111,676	24,872
Percentage	62.3%	30.8%	6.9%
- Lamborn: 40–50% 50–60% 60–70% 70–80% 80–90% Plowright: 40–50% 50–60% 60–70% 80–90%
U.S. Representative before election
Doug Lamborn
Republican
Elected U.S. Representative
Doug Lamborn
Republican

The 5th district is located in Central Colorado and includes Fremont, El Paso, Teller and Chaffee counties and the city of Colorado Springs. The incumbent was Republican Doug Lamborn, who had represented the district since 2007. He was re-elected with 60% of the vote in 2014. The district had a PVI of R+13.

=== Republican primary ===
==== Candidates ====
===== Nominee =====
- Doug Lamborn, incumbent U.S. representative

===== Eliminated in primary =====
- Calandra Vargas

==== Results ====
Republican primary results
Party	Candidate	Votes	%
Republican	Doug Lamborn (incumbent)	51,018	68.0
Republican	Calandra Vargas	23,968	32.0
Total votes		74,986	100.0

=== Democratic primary ===
==== Candidates ====
===== Nominee =====
- Misty Plowright, Army veteran

===== Eliminated in primary =====
- Donald Martinez

==== Results ====
Democratic primary results
Party	Candidate	Votes	%
Democratic	Misty Plowright	13,419	58.2
Democratic	Donald E. Martinez	9,658	41.8
Total votes		23,077	100.0

=== General election ===
==== Predictions ====
Source	Ranking	As of
The Cook Political Report	Safe R	November 7, 2016
Daily Kos Elections	Safe R	November 7, 2016
Rothenberg	Safe R	November 3, 2016
Sabato's Crystal Ball	Safe R	November 7, 2016
RCP	Safe R	October 31, 2016

==== Results ====
Colorado's 5th congressional district, 2016
Party	Candidate	Votes	%
Republican	Doug Lamborn (incumbent)	225,445	62.3
Democratic	Misty Plowright	111,676	30.8
Libertarian	Mike McRedmond	24,872	6.9
Total votes		361,993	100.0
Republican hold			

== District 6 ==
2016 Colorado's 6th congressional district election
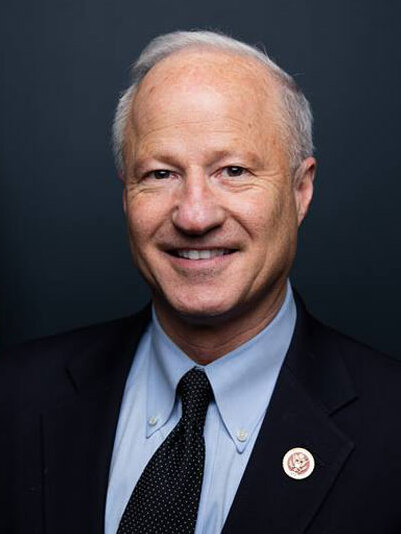

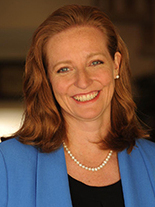

Nominee	Mike Coffman	Morgan Carroll	Norm Olsen
Party	Republican	Democratic	Libertarian
Popular vote	191,626	160,372	18,778
Percentage	50.9%	42.6%	5.0%
- Coffman: 40–50% 50–60% 60–70% 70–80% Carroll: 40–50% 50–60% 60–70% 70–80% No votes
U.S. Representative before election
Mike Coffman
Republican
Elected U.S. Representative
Mike Coffman
Republican

The 6th district is located in Central Colorado and surrounds the city of Denver from the east, including the city of Aurora. The incumbent was Republican Mike Coffman, who had represented the district since 2009. He was re-elected with 52% of the vote in 2014. The district had a PVI of D+1.

=== Republican primary ===
==== Candidates ====
===== Nominee =====
- Mike Coffman, incumbent U.S. representative

==== Results ====
Republican primary results
Party	Candidate	Votes	%
Republican	Mike Coffman (incumbent)	41,288	100.0
Total votes		41,288	100.0

=== Democratic primary ===
On July 5, 2015, Morgan Carroll, the former president of the Colorado Senate, announced that she planned to challenge Coffman. Andrew Romanoff, the former Speaker of the Colorado House of Representatives and the 2014 Democratic nominee, considered running again but ultimately decided against it. Former state representative Edward Casso established an exploratory committee in 2014 in preparation for a potential challenge, but ultimately did not run.

==== Candidates ====
===== Nominee =====
- Morgan Carroll, former Minority Leader of the Colorado Senate

===== Declined =====
- Edward Casso, former state representative
- Rhonda Fields, state representative
- Rebecca McClellan, Centennial city councilor
- Karen Middleton, former state representative and former member of the Colorado State Board of Education
- Andrew Romanoff, former Speaker of the Colorado House of Representatives, candidate for U.S. Senate in 2010 and nominee for the seat in 2014

==== Results ====
Democratic primary results
Party	Candidate	Votes	%
Democratic	Morgan Carroll	30,704	100.0
Total votes		30,704	100.0

=== General election ===
==== Campaign ====
The conservative political advocacy group Americans for Prosperity, which receives funding from the Koch brothers, launched a six-figure campaign effort supporting Coffman's candidacy.

==== Endorsements ====
Mike Coffman (R)

Newspapers

- The Denver Post
Morgan Carroll (D)

State officials

- John Hickenlooper, governor of Colorado

Organizations

- EMILY's List

==== Predictions ====
Source	Ranking	As of
The Cook Political Report	Tossup	November 7, 2016
Daily Kos Elections	Tossup	November 7, 2016
Rothenberg	Tilt R	November 3, 2016
Sabato's Crystal Ball	Lean R	November 7, 2016
RCP	Tossup	October 31, 2016

==== Results ====
Colorado's 6th congressional district, 2016
Party	Candidate	Votes	%
Republican	Mike Coffman (incumbent)	191,626	50.9
Democratic	Morgan Carroll	160,372	42.6
Libertarian	Norm Olsen	18,778	5.0
Green	Robert Lee Worthey	5,641	1.5
Total votes		376,417	100.0
Republican hold			

== District 7 ==
2016 Colorado's 7th congressional district election
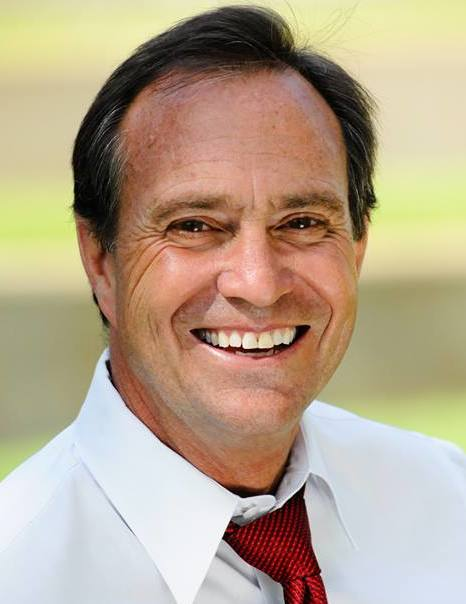

Nominee	Ed Perlmutter	George Athanasopoulos	Martin L. Buchanan
Party	Democratic	Republican	Libertarian
Popular vote	199,758	144,066	18,186
Percentage	55.2%	39.8%	5.0%
- Perlmutter: 40–50% 50–60% 60–70% 70–80% Athanasopoulos: 40–50% 50–60% 60–70% 70–80% Tie: 40–50% No votes
U.S. Representative before election
Ed Perlmutter
Democratic
Elected U.S. Representative
Ed Perlmutter
Democratic

The 7th district is located in Central Colorado, to the north and west of Denver and includes the cities of Thornton and Westminster and most of Lakewood. The incumbent was Democrat Ed Perlmutter, who had represented the district since 2007. He was re-elected with 55% of the vote in 2014. The district had a PVI of D+5.

=== Democratic primary ===
==== Candidates ====
===== Nominee =====
- Ed Perlmutter, incumbent U.S. representative

==== Results ====
Democratic primary results
Party	Candidate	Votes	%
Democratic	Ed Perlmutter (incumbent)	35,196	100.0

=== Republican primary ===
==== Candidates ====
===== Nominee =====
- George Athanasopoulos

==== Results ====
Republican primary results
Party	Candidate	Votes	%
Republican	George Athanasopoulos	29,614	100.0

=== General election ===
==== Predictions ====
Source	Ranking	As of
The Cook Political Report	Safe D	November 7, 2016
Daily Kos Elections	Safe D	November 7, 2016
Rothenberg	Safe D	November 3, 2016
Sabato's Crystal Ball	Safe D	November 7, 2016
RCP	Safe D	October 31, 2016

==== Results ====
Colorado's 7th congressional district, 2016
Party	Candidate	Votes	%
Democratic	Ed Perlmutter (incumbent)	199,758	55.2
Republican	George Athanasopoulos	144,066	39.8
Libertarian	Martin L. Buchanan	18,186	5.0
Total votes		362,010	100.0
Democratic hold			

== See also ==
- 2016 Colorado State Board of Regents at-large election
