= Senator Hagedorn =

Senator Hagedorn may refer to:

- Bob Hagedorn (born 1952), Colorado State Senate
- Garrett W. Hagedorn (1910–1985), New Jersey State Senate
