= Debbie Allen (politician) =

American politician in Colorado

Debbie Allen is a former state legislator in Colorado. She was elected to the Colorado House of Representatives in 1992 and served until 2000. She was a Republican.

She chaired the education committee.

She served in Colorado House District 43. She was succeeded by Frank Weddig.
