= Su Ryden =

American politician

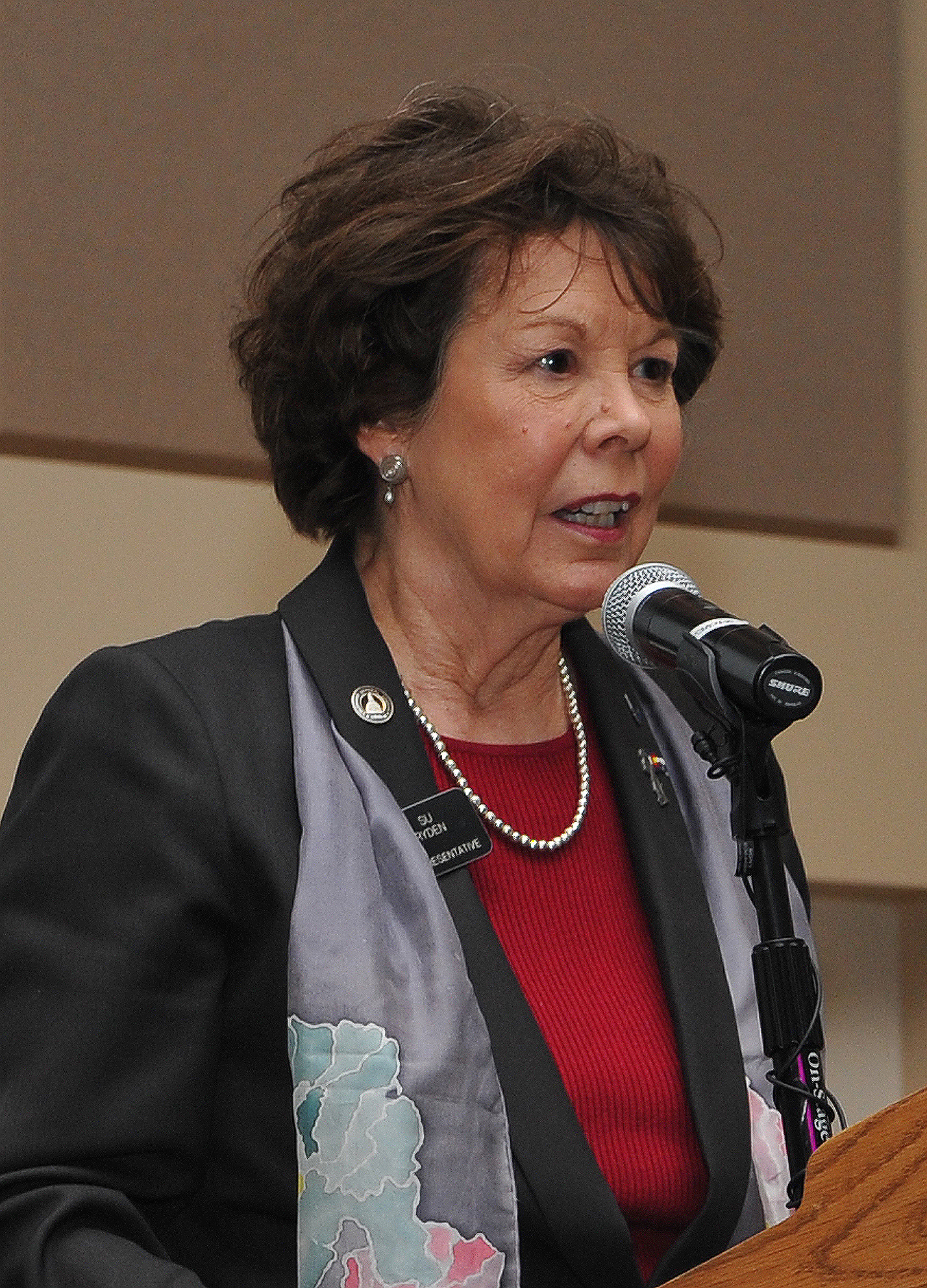
- Ryden in 2013

Member of the Colorado House of Representatives from the 36th district
- In office January 7, 2009 – January 11, 2017
- Preceded by: Morgan Carroll
- Succeeded by: Mike Weissman

Personal details
- Party: Democratic

Susan "Su" Ryden is a former legislator in the U.S. state of Colorado. Elected to the Colorado House of Representatives as a Democrat in 2008, Ryden represented House District 36, which encompasses eastern Aurora, Colorado. Term limited, she did not run for re-election to the State House in the 2016 election. However, she ran for State Senate in District 29 but lost in the Democratic primary to Rhonda Fields. Her term in the State House ended in January, 2017. She currently serves as Public Trustee of Arapahoe County, Colorado, having been appointed by Gov. John Hickenlooper in 2017 and re-appointed by Gov. Jared Polis in 2019.

== Biography ==
A native of Hastings, Nebraska, Ryden graduated from the University of Denver in 1967 with a bachelor's degree in mass communications. She worked for marketing firms in Denver, San Diego, Pensacola, Florida, and Norfolk, Virginia while her husband, Jerome, served in the U.S. Navy. The couple worked as freelance photojournalists, traveling throughout the U.S. and Latin America before returning to Colorado in 1974. They founded Ryden & Associates, a marketing firm, in 1975.

Ryden has served on the boards of the Denver Rotary Club Foundation, the Aurora Historic Preservation Commission, Leadership Aurora and the Aurora Fox Arts Center. She has also been active in the Colorado Kids 1st license plate campaign and the soberRide campaign against drunk driving.

In 2004, Ryden received the Randolph P. McDonough Award for service to alumni of the University of Denver. In 2005, she received the Aurora Chamber's Women in Business "Unsung Hero" Award and the Elizabeth Johnson Award for her work in the field of historic preservation.

In 2016, she received the Aurora Chamber's Outstanding Woman award, as well as the United Veterans Committee Legislator of the Year award.

== Legislative career ==
=== 2008 election ===
Ryden announced her candidacy for the state legislature in February 2008, after incumbent Morgan Carroll announced her candidacy for the state senate amidst a scandal that prompted the withdrawal of the previous candidate, Michael Garcia. Ryden was endorsed by Carroll, was nominated by unanimous acclamation at the Democratic house district assembly, and saw no opposition in the August Democratic primary.

Ryden faced Republican Kathy Green in the November 2008 general election. Ryden's candidacy was endorsed by the Aurora Sentinel and the Denver Post, and she won with 60 percent of the popular vote.

=== 2009-10 legislative session ===
For the 2009-10 legislative session, Ryden was named to seats on the House Business Affairs Committee and the House Judiciary Committee.

=== 2010 election ===
Ryden won reelection with 54.7% of the vote.

=== 2011-12 legislative session ===
Ryden was elected as the House Minority Deputy Caucus Chair in 2011. She served on the Judiciary Committee and House Agriculture, Livestock and Natural Resources Committee.

=== 2012 election ===
In the 2012 General Election, Ryden faced Republican challenger James Parker. Ryden was reelected by a margin of 57% to 39%.

=== 2013-14 legislative session ===
Ryden was elected House Majority Deputy Whip in 2013. She also was appointed Chair of the State, Veterans & Military Affairs committee. She served on the Audit Committee and Business & Labor Committee.

=== 2014 election ===
Ryden ran for her 4th and final term in 2014, and defeated Republican opponent Richard Bowman.

=== 2015-16 legislative session ===
Ryden was elected House Majority Whip in 2015, and continued serving as Chair of the State, Veterans & Military Affairs Committee. She also served on the Audit Committee, the Health and Insurance Committee. As a member of the Health Exchange Oversight Committee, she helped oversee the launch of Colorado's health exchange under the Affordable Care Act of 2010.

== Public Trustee career ==
In June, 2016, Gov. John Hickenlooper appointed Ryden as Public Trustee for Arapahoe County. Colorado's Public Trustee system is unique among the 50 states and dates back to the Silver Crisis of the 1890s. At that time, Colorado was in a deep depression and record numbers of miners, merchants and homeowners were losing their property to foreclosure. The State Legislature decided to take the process out of the courts and put it in the hands of Public Trustees who were pledged to provide a relatively inexpensive process that ensured fairness for everyone concerned.

In 2019, the Legislature passed HB19-1295, which mandates that the currently appointed Public Trustee positions will be eliminated in July 2020, and the County Treasurers will assume the Public Trustee duties.
