= Misty Plowright =

American politician

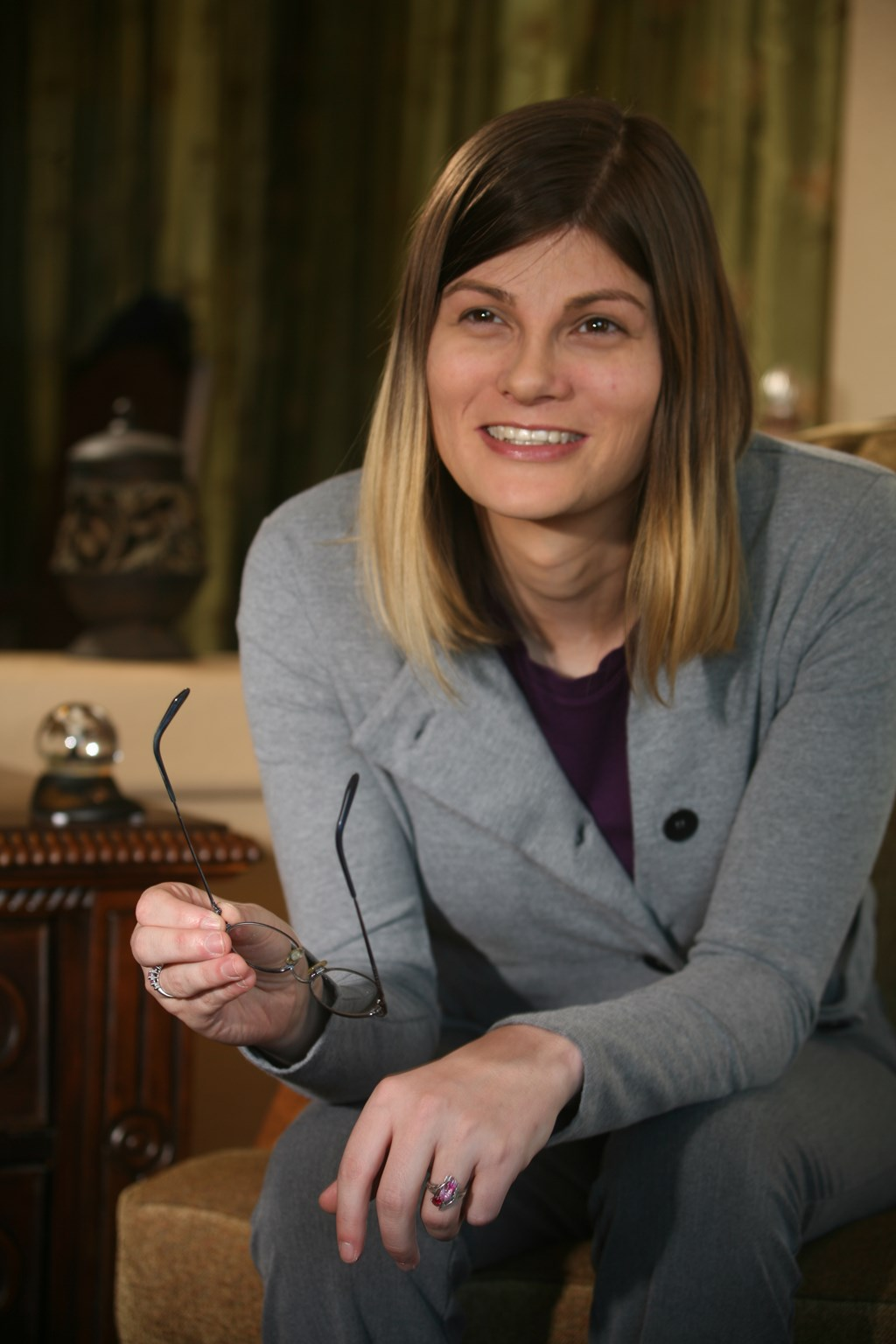

Personal details
- Born: 1983 (age 42–43) California, U.S.
- Party: Democratic
- Spouse: Lisa Wilkes (m. 2014)

Military service
- Allegiance: United States
- Branch/service: United States Army
- Years of service: 2003–2004

Misty Dawn Plowright (born 1983) is an American political activist. She is one of the first two openly transgender people in the United States to become a candidate representing a major political party for a national office, the other being Misty Snow. She was the first openly transgender candidate to win a major party primary for the House of Representatives. She went on to challenge incumbent Republican Doug Lamborn representing Colorado's 5th congressional district in the 2016 general election. Plowright lost to Lamborn on November 8, 2016.

== Early life and career ==
Plowright was born in California, and at the age of four moved to northwest Arkansas where she was raised as a Southern Baptist. She is a U.S. Army veteran, serving as an Information Systems Operator/Analyst from 2003 to 2004. After sustaining a non-combat injury, she was honorably discharged and went on to work in information technology.

=== Congressional campaign ===
Plowright announced her campaign for Colorado's 5th congressional district on March 18, 2016 via Facebook. Her official campaign website was launched on March 31, 2016, the International Transgender Day of Visibility. She ran as a progressive and was openly supportive of Bernie Sanders's presidential campaign. After he lost the nomination to Hillary Clinton, she was considering voting for Green nominee Jill Stein, stating that she would only vote for Clinton if she "actually truly believed that Trump was Hitler 2.0 and he was actually going to do that level of evil."

Plowright lost to incumbent Doug Lamborn in the general election, who won his sixth term. She conceded the race the next day.

== Personal life ==
Plowright lives in Colorado Springs, Colorado with her wife, Lisa. The couple entered a domestic partnership in Seattle in 2010. After changes in legislation, they were legally married in 2014. They are in a polyamorous relationship with their mutual partner, Sebastian.

== Electoral history ==
2016 Colorado's 5th congressional district Democratic primary
Party	Candidate	Votes	%
Democratic	Misty Plowright	13,419	58.15
Democratic	Donald E. Martinez	9,658	41.85
Total votes		23,077	100.00

2016 Colorado's 5th congressional district election
Party	Candidate	Votes	%
Republican	Doug Lamborn (incumbent)	225,445	62.28
Democratic	Misty Plowright	111,676	30.85
Libertarian	Mike McRedmond	24,872	6.87
Total votes		361,993	100.00
Republican hold			

== See also ==
- Misty Snow
