= Mike Weissman =

American politician

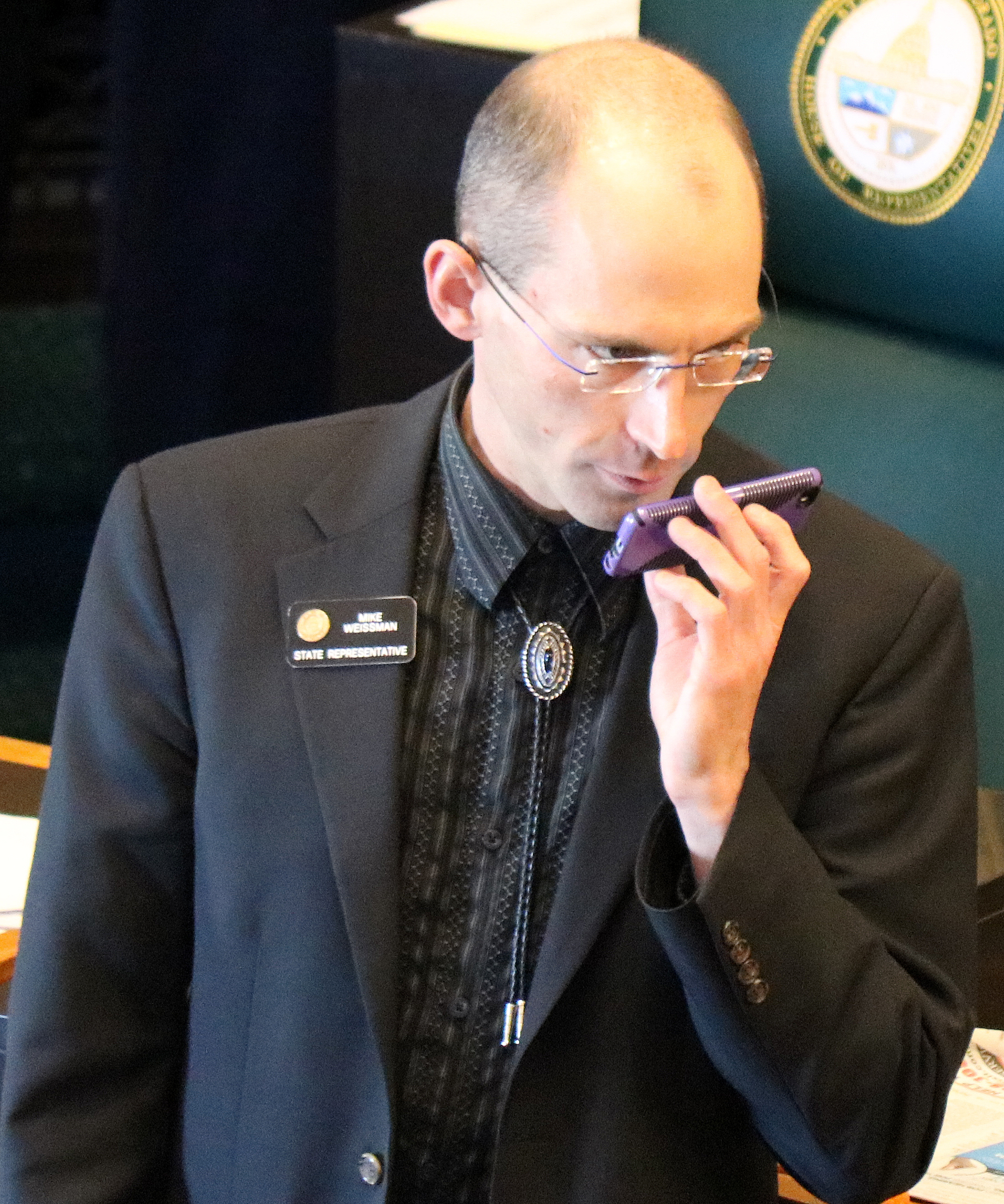
- Weissman in 2018.

Member of the Colorado Senate from the 28th district
- Incumbent
- Assumed office January 8, 2025
- Preceded by: Rhonda Fields

Member of the Colorado House of Representatives from the 36th district
- In office January 11, 2017 – January 8, 2025
- Preceded by: Su Ryden
- Succeeded by: Michael Carter

Personal details
- Party: Democratic
- Education: Tufts University (BA); University of Colorado, Boulder (JD)

Mike Weissman is a Democratic member of the Colorado House of Representatives. He represents District 36, which covers a portion of Arapahoe County. He was first elected to his seat in 2016, succeeding Su Ryden.

Weissman is an attorney who has been an active member of the Colorado Democratic Party since 2004. He has worked as the director of the party's Voter Expansion Project and as a campaign manager for former Colorado Senate president Morgan Carroll.

Weissman serves on the House Judiciary Committee and the House State, Veterans, and Military Affairs Committee.

== Elections ==
Weissman was elected to the Colorado House of Representatives in 2016, winning with 55.29% of the vote against Republican opponent Richard Bowman.
