= Rick Palacio =

American political executive

Chair of the Colorado Democratic Party
- In office March 5, 2011 – March 11, 2017
- Preceded by: Pat Waak
- Succeeded by: Morgan Carroll

Personal details
- Born: November 3, 1974 (age 51) Pueblo, Colorado, U.S.
- Party: Democratic
- Education: Regis University

Rick Palacio (born November 3, 1974) is an American political executive who served as Chairman of the Colorado Democratic Party from 2011 to 2017.

== Early life and education ==
He was born in Pueblo, Colorado. Palacio graduated from Regis University in Denver.

== Career ==
Prior to his service as Chair, Palacio worked in a variety of roles in Colorado and national politics. Palacio held multiple roles with then-U.S. Rep. John Salazar, including Legislative Assistant and later Deputy Communications Director.

In 2008, he was hired as Deputy Director of Member Service in the office of the House Majority Leader Steny Hoyer. Palacio was one of the primary Congressional staffers responsible for the repeal of Don't ask, don't tell.

Palacio was elected Chairman of the Colorado Democratic Party on March 5, 2011. He is the first Latino in Colorado's history to hold the office of chair of a major political party, and when elected was second in the nation. Palacio served as a Senior Advisor for the John Hickenlooper 2020 presidential campaign.

Palacio is the founder of PSGroup, a political and corporate consulting firm based in Denver, Colorado. In April 2020, Palacio joined Brownstein Hyatt Farber Schreck, a law and lobbying firm, in their State & Local Legislation & Policy Group.

== Ethics investigation ==
After investigating an ethics complaint filed against Palacio, Colorado's Independent Ethics Commission found that he violated state law by accepting state consulting work too soon after working in a state office. Palacio had temporarily worked as the governor's chief of staff, filling in for the permanent chief of staff when she was on maternity leave.

His work as interim chief of staff occurred in late 2020, and the permanent chief returned to work on November 9, 2020. Palacio stayed on until the end of November. His subsequent consulting work on pandemic issues began on December 1, and he had been working on the same issues while filling in as chief of staff. State law requires a six-month waiting period before someone can do contract work with the state after having been employed by the state and doing similar work. Palacio was paid $14,000 per month for the consulting work, which lasted from December 2020 to May 2021. The commission did not levy any penalty against Palacio, finding he had not violated the public trust.

== Awards and recognition ==
- 2008: 5280 Magazine's list of Colorado's Most Influential Latinos
- 2011: Advocate Magazine's List of 40 Under Forty
- 2011: Out Front Colorado's "Power" list of most Influential GLBT Coloradans
- 2011: Southern Colorado Equality Alliance "Pride of Pueblo" award
- 2015: 40 Under 40: Latinos in American Politics
