= Colorado's 29th Senate district =

American legislative district

Colorado's 29th State Senate district
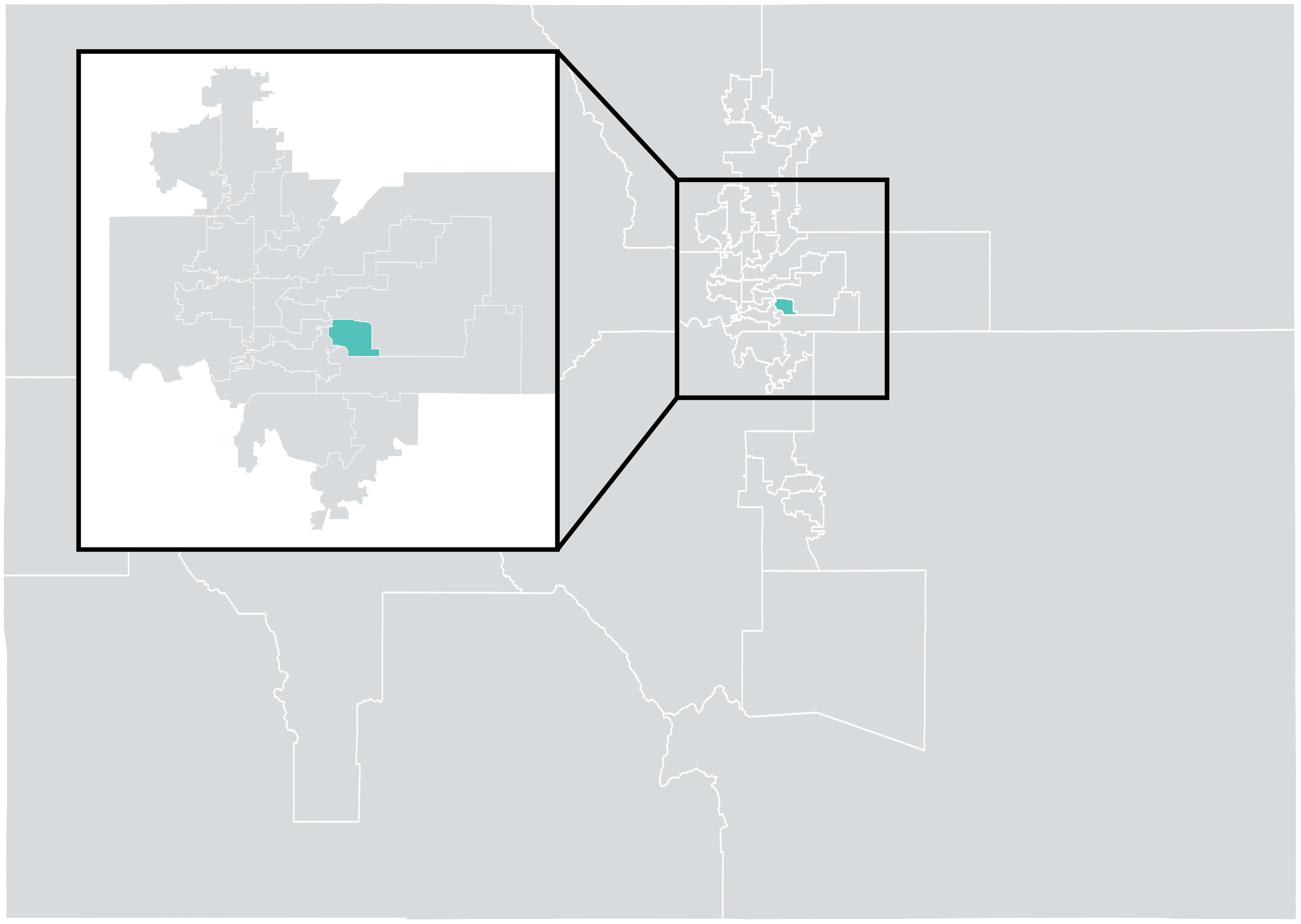
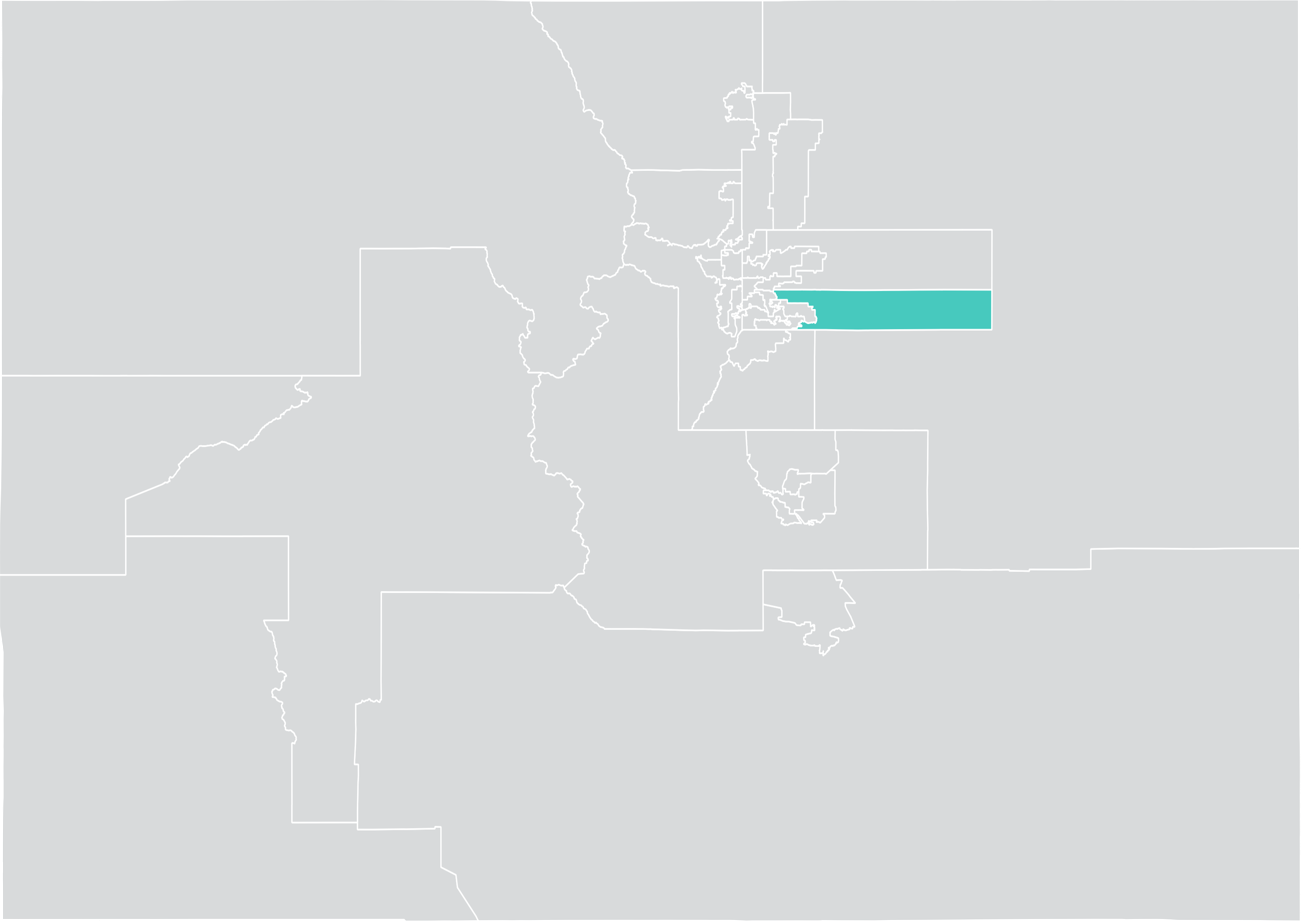
Senator
| Janet Buckner; D–Aurora |
- Registration: 33.8% Democratic; 15.6% Republican; 47.9% No party preference
- Demographics: 41% White; 17% Black; 32% Hispanic; 5% Asian; 1% Native American; 1% Hawaiian/Pacific Islander; 3% Other
- Population (2018): 160,470
- Registered voters: 97,083

Colorado's 29th Senate district is one of 35 districts in the Colorado Senate. It has been represented by Democrat Janet Buckner since 2023. Prior to redistricting the district was represented by Democrats Rhonda Fields and Morgan Carroll.

== Geography ==
District 29 is based in northern and central Aurora, also covering several rural communities in eastern Arapahoe County including Bennett, Byers, and Strasburg.

The district is located in between Colorado's 6th congressional district and 4th district; while much of the land is in the 4th, the bulk of the district's population resides in the 6th. It overlaps with the 36th, 42nd, and 56th districts of the Colorado House of Representatives.

== Recent election results ==
Colorado state senators are elected to staggered four-year terms; under normal circumstances, the 29th district holds elections in presidential years.

=== 2020 ===
2020 Colorado State Senate election, District 29
| Party | Candidate | Votes | % |
|---|---|---|---|
| Democratic | Rhonda Fields (incumbent) | 45,828 | 68.7 |
| Libertarian | Michele Poague | 20,914 | 31.3 |
| Total votes | | 66,742 | 100 |
| Democratic hold | | | |

=== 2016 ===
2016 Colorado State Senate election, District 29
Primary election
| Party | Candidate | Votes | % |
|---|---|---|---|
| Democratic | Rhonda Fields | 5,418 | 74.2 |
| Democratic | Su Ryden | 1,882 | 25.8 |
| Total votes | | 7,300 | 100 |
General election
| Democratic | Rhonda Fields | 30,998 | 54.2 |
| Republican | Sebastian Chunn | 22,503 | 39.3 |
| Libertarian | Michele Poague | 3,698 | 6.5 |
| Total votes | | 57,199 | 100 |
| Democratic hold | | | |

=== 2012 ===
2012 Colorado State Senate election, District 29
| Party | Candidate | Votes | % |
|---|---|---|---|
| Democratic | Morgan Carroll (incumbent) | 30,149 | 58.8 |
| Republican | William "Bill" D. Ross II | 18,745 | 36.5 |
| Libertarian | Michele Poague | 2,420 | 4.7 |
| Total votes | | 51,314 | 100 |
| Democratic hold | | | |

=== Federal and statewide results ===
| Year | Office | Results |
|---|---|---|
| 2020 | President | Biden 61.1 – 36.2% |
| 2018 | Governor | Polis 58.1 – 37.9% |
| 2016 | President | Clinton 54.9 – 37.4% |
| 2014 | Senate | Udall 50.1 – 43.5% |
| 2014 | Governor | Hickenlooper 52.4 – 42.7% |
| 2012 | President | Obama 60.2 – 37.6% |
