= Pat Waak =

American political executive

Chair of the Colorado Democratic Party
- In office 2005–2011
- Succeeded by: Rick Palacio

Personal details
- Born: Patricia A. Waak; February 1, 1943 (age 83) Muskogee, Oklahoma, U.S.
- Party: Democratic
- Education: Tulane University (BS)

Patricia A. "Pat" Waak (born February 1, 1943) is an American political executive who served as the chair of the Colorado Democratic Party from 2005 to 2011. A population and environmental policy analyst and consultant, Waak was elected to chair the Colorado Democratic Party in 2005. She led the party as it saw statewide gains in 2006 and won the right to host the 2008 Democratic National Convention.

== Early life and education ==
Waak was born in Muskogee, Oklahoma and raised in Conroe, Texas. She became a registered nurse and was a Peace Corps volunteer in Brazil, where she taught maternal and child health She earned a nursing degree from Mather School of Nursing; a BS from Saint Josephs College; MA in psychology form Regis University; and DMin in ecological spirituality.

== Career ==
During the Carter administration, she worked for the United States Agency for International Development before joining Columbia University as Assistant Director for the Center for Population and Family Health. She spent 17 years at the National Audubon Society, from 1985 to 1999.

In 2011, Colorado Governor appointed Waak to the Colorado State Parole Board which was confirmed by the Colorado State Senate where she served as the Vice Chair until 2013. She then served as a contractor to the board for two years.

Waak was a delegate to the 1994 U.N. International Conference on Population and Development, and chaired the population and environment technical committee for the Commission on Environmental Strategies and Planning of the World Conservation Union. She was named a Population Reference Bureau Honorary Fellow in 1992, and received the Audubon Society's Charles Callison Award in 1998. She was the executive director of an environmental center and foundation in Loveland, Colorado.

Waak is the author of My Bones Are Red, a genealogical memoir published in 2005 and "Planet Awakening" published by the National Audubon Society. She is married to Ken Strom with whom she edited and co-authored "Sharing the Earth." Waak has two daughters from a previous marriage to Joe Baldi, Cinira Baldi and Rachel Carter. and three granddaughters

=== Politics ===
Waak's served as deputy campaign manager for Sargent Shriver's brief 1976 presidential campaign. She was a candidate for U.S. Congress in Colorado's 4th congressional district in 2002. A resident of Erie, Colorado, she has also served as a Democratic Party precinct chair and a member of the Weld County Democratic Party Executive Committee.

She was elected to chair the Colorado Democratic Party in March 2005, defeating incumbent party chair Chris Gates in a narrow 187–184 vote by Colorado's Democratic Party central committee. Waak was re-elected unanimously to a second two-year term in March 2007. During her term as state party chair, Colorado Democrats won control of the governorship and Congressional seat in 2006 and successfully bid to host the 2008 Democratic National Convention. Waak presided over the 2008 Colorado Democratic Party Convention, the largest convention in state party history. In 2009, she was elected to a third term as Colorado Democratic Party chair, the first time a chair was elected for three consecutive terms in 54 years.

As Colorado Democratic Party chair, she was a superdelegate to the 2008 Democratic National Convention. Waak endorsed Obama on May 28, shortly before the final Democratic primaries, during a visit by Obama to the state, citing Obama's success in the February caucuses in Colorado and Obama's lead in general election polling of Colorado voters.

Waak is a regular op-ed writer for HuffPost.
