= Bob Hagedorn =

American politician and journalist

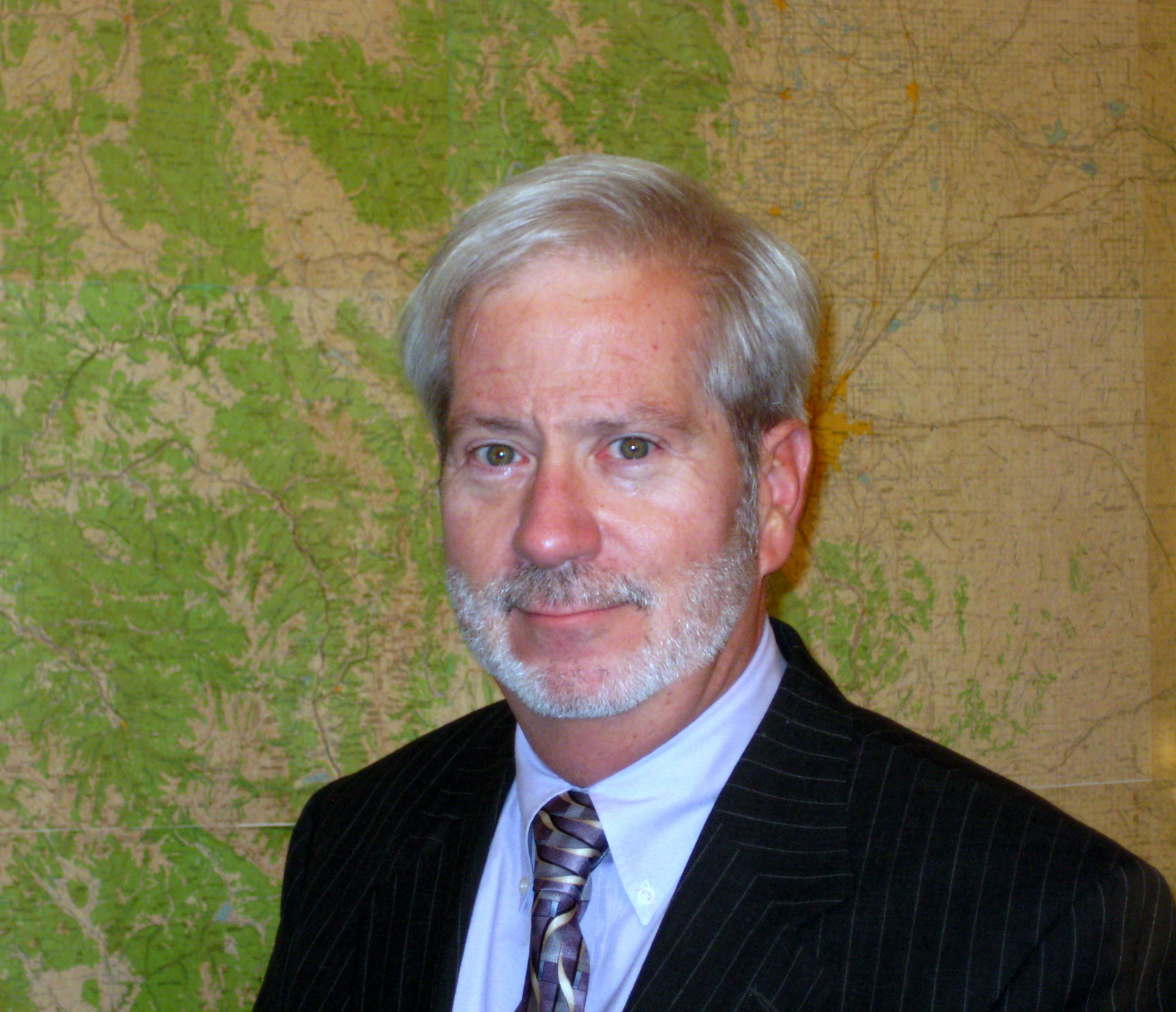

Member of the Colorado Senate from the 29th district
- In office January 10, 2001 – January 7, 2009
- Succeeded by: Morgan Carroll

Member of the Colorado House of Representatives from the 15th district
- In office January 1993 – January 10, 2001
- Succeeded by: Michael Garcia

Personal details
- Born: February 16, 1952 (age 74) Elizabeth City, North Carolina, U.S.
- Party: Democratic
- Education: University of Colorado Boulder (BA); University of Colorado Denver (MA)

Bob Hagedorn (born February 16, 1952) is an American politician and journalist who served in the Colorado House of Representatives as a Democrat from 1993 to 2001. After serving eight years in the state house, Hagedorn was elected to the Colorado Senate in 2000 and again in 2004, representing Senate District 29, which includes central Aurora, Colorado.

== Early career ==
Born in Elizabeth City, North Carolina to a military family, Hagedorn family settled in Aurora, Colorado in 1965 and he attended local schools, graduating from Aurora Central High School in 1970. He earned a bachelor's degree in journalism from the University of Colorado Boulder in 1974 and a master's degree in urban affairs from the University of Colorado Denver in 1979.

== Career ==
Hagedorn has worked as a political science instructor at Metropolitan State College of Denver, and served on its faculty from 1990 to 2004. He has also worked in the fields of marketing, public relations, and journalism, working as the editor of the Capitol Hill Neighborhood News. From 1998 to 2004, Hagedorn sat on the Board of Directors of Arapahoe House, a non-profit provider of drug and alcohol treatment services.

=== Politics ===
Hagedorn was first elected to the Colorado House of Representatives in 1992 and re-elected three times, including a 1996 re-election after struggling with alcoholism and time in a rehabilitation program following his mother's cancer diagnosis. During his time in the state house, Hagedorn worked on issues including patient protection legislation, and prevention strategies in the criminal justice system, and was named by the Democratic Leadership Council as one of "100 to Watch" among young Democratic officeholders. Term-limited, Hagedorn went on to serve in the Colorado State Senate, elected in 2000 and 2004 to represent the solidly Democratic district. Hagedorn emphasized health care issues in particular during his Senate tenure and his 2004 re-election campaign.

In the 2007 session of the Colorado General Assembly, Hagedorn served as chair of the Senate Health and Human Services Committee and as a member of the Senate Transportation Committee In past Senate sessions, Hagedorn has served on the Senate Finance Committee and the Senate Agriculture and Natural Resources Committee. During the 2007 session, Hagedorn successfully sponsored legislation to establish a state prescription drug discount program—the first bill signed into law by Gov. Bill Ritter—and to declare John Denver's "Rocky Mountain High" the second official state song.

Hagedorn has been named "Legislator of the Year" by a wide range of groups, including the American Cancer Society in 2000, the Colorado Association of Commerce and Industry awarded him in 1995 and 1999 and the Colorado Association of Public Employees in 2004.
