= Frank Weddig =

American politician (1944-2012)

Member of the Colorado Senate from the 29th district
- In office 1994–2000
- Preceded by: Steve Ruddick
- Succeeded by: Bob Hagedorn

Member of the Colorado House of Representatives from the 43rd district
- In office 2000–2002

Member of the Colorado House of Representatives from the 36th district
- In office 2002–2004
- Preceded by: Debbie Allen
- Succeeded by: Morgan Carroll

Personal details
- Born: November 1, 1944 West Bend, Wisconsin, US
- Died: October 26, 2012 (aged 67)
- Party: Democratic Party
- Spouse: Patricia Weddig
- Children: 3 daughters
- Occupation: Retired electrician

Military service
- Allegiance: United States
- Branch/service: Air Force
- Years of service: 4
- Rank: A1C

Franklin Otto Weddig (November 1, 1944 – October 26, 2012) was an American politician from Aurora, Colorado. He was a Colorado State Senator from 1994 to 2000 and a State Representative from 2000 to 2004. He served as an Arapahoe County commissioner from 2004 to 2012. He was a member of the Democratic Party.

Frank Weddig was born in West Bend, Wisconsin and was an electrician by trade. He was married to Patrica, and had three daughters.
