= Michael Garcia (Colorado politician) =

American politician (born 1974)

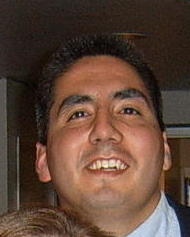
- Garcia in 2006

Member of the Colorado House of Representatives from the 42nd district
- In office January 10, 2001 – February 1, 2008
- Preceded by: Bob Hagedorn
- Succeeded by: Karen Middleton

Personal details
- Born: January 11, 1974 (age 52) Fort Bragg, North Carolina, U.S.
- Party: Democratic
- Education: University of Colorado Boulder (BA); University of Arizona (MA); Loyola University New Orleans (JD)

Michael Garcia (born January 11, 1974) is an American politician who served in the Colorado House of Representatives. Elected as a Democrat in 2000, Garcia was re-elected three times to represent House District 42, which includes central Aurora, Colorado.

== Early career ==
Born in Fort Bragg, North Carolina to a U.S. Army veteran, Garcia's family settled in Aurora, Colorado, where he attended Aurora Public Schools and graduated from Aurora Central High School in 1992. He then earned a Bachelor of Arts (BA) from the University of Colorado Boulder in 1996 and a Master of Arts from the University of Arizona in 1998. After graduation, Garcia received a fellowship from the Congressional Hispanic Caucus to serve as a legislative assistant to Texas U.S. Representative Solomon P. Ortiz; he worked in Washington, DC until 1999 before returning to Colorado.

From May 2003 to December 2007, he was as Coordinator for the Youth Council for Public Policy at the University of Colorado at Boulder. While working at CU, he taught college courses on American government, including a course titled "Civic Engagement: Using the Electoral Process as a Tool for Social Change. He has also served on the Board of Directors of Spirit of Aurora, the Aurora Education Foundation, and the Aurora Museum Foundation. In 2006, Garcia was named one of the Denver Business Journal's "40 under 40" list of young achievers.

In 2012 Garcia received a Juris Doctor degree from Loyola University New Orleans College of Law.

== Legislative career ==
Garcia returned to Colorado and launched his first legislative campaign in 2000, winning a seat in the Colorado House of Representatives after defeating three other opponents in a contested Democratic party primary. His election at the age of 26 made him the youngest legislator in the state of Colorado. He was subsequently re-elected three times to the state house, winning handily each time in the solidly Democratic district.

In 2004, after Democrats gained control of the state house, Garcia was elected Assistant Majority Leader, a post he held through 2008.

In 2006, Garcia sponsored legislation to create a Denver Broncos specialty license plate.

=== 2007 legislative session ===
In the 2007 and 2008 legislative sessions, Garcia sat on the House Appropriations Committee and the House Finance Committee.

During the 2007 legislative session, Garcia sponsored a measure to lower the age of legislative candidacy in Colorado, currently set at 25. The referendum, an amendment to the Colorado Constitution to lower the age limit to 21, (Garcia's original proposal would have set the age at 18) passed the General Assembly and will be on the statewide general election ballot in 2008.

Garcia also sponsored contentious legislation during the 2007 session to amend Colorado's labor laws to ease restrictions on the formation of closed shop unions. Although it passed the legislature, the bill was vetoed by Democratic Gov. Bill Ritter. Following the veto, Garcia stated that he would not seek to overturn the veto or re-introduce the legislation.

Garcia was the House sponsor of a measure introduced in the Colorado State Senate to require that passage of an English competency test be required for high school graduation. The measure died in a Senate committee. Garcia introduced legislation which revised rules surrounding real estate foreclosures, including forbidding consensual liens on foreclosed properties. Garcia also sponsored revisions to House rules to limit the number and type of introductions that could be given by members on the House floor.

=== Interim Committee Chairmanship ===
Between the 2007 and 2008 legislative sessions, Garcia chaired the Interim Committee on Long-term Care Services and Supports for Persons with Developmental Disabilities. As a result of his work with this committee, he proposed a half-cent sales tax increase to fund services for several thousand Colorado residents with developmental disabilities currently on waiting lists, but withdrew the proposal amid criticism.

The Committee was also the catalyst for Amendment 51, an initiative initially written by Garcia, which sought to raise the sales tax and dedicate the revenue for health care services for the developmentally disabled. Amendment 51 was defeated by the Colorado voters in the November 2008 election.

=== Honors and awards ===
Garcia was awarded a "Rising Star" award in 2001 from the Colorado Democratic Party. In 2002, Garcia earned a Colorado Association of Commerce and Industry (CACI) Star Award (formerly the Business Legislator of the Year Award), for support of the business agenda and Colorado's economy. In 2003, Garcia was named one of the Democratic Leadership Council's (DLC) "100 New Democrats to Watch." In 2006, Garcia was named "Legislator of the Year" by the Colorado Public Trustees Association for his work on improving Colorado's foreclosure laws. In 2007, Garcia was recognized by the Denver Business Journal as "Forty Under 40," as one of 40 outstanding local professionals under age 40 for their business success and community contributions. More recently, Garcia was recognized by the Aurora Civitan as their "Man of the Year" and earned the Joe Schippicasse "Do the Right Thing" Award from the ARC of Pikes Peak for his work on behalf of the developmentally disabled community.

=== Resignation ===
Garcia resigned from office on February 1, 2008 amid a scandal in which he was accused of sexual misconduct at a bar with a female lobbyist. Garcia's resignation statement described the incident as "consensual": "The other party and I engaged in consensual conduct that was inappropriate given my position in the legislature and the fact that the other party is a lobbyist." The lobbyist's account of the incident was different.

A Democratic vacancy committee appointed Karen Middleton to serve the remainder of Garcia's term.

== Metro Community Provider Network ==
After his service in the Colorado General Assembly, Garcia served as the Special Projects Manager at Metro Community Provider Network (MCPN), one of the largest primary health care providers of the uninsured and medically underserved in Colorado. Garcia was responsible for managing the Specialty Referral Network which facilitates affordable access to specialty care services for MCPN patients. Garcia also managed the MCPN Advocacy Network, which educates, empowers, and inspires MCPN Advocates to advocate on behalf of MCPN and its patients to elected officials.
