= Morgan Carroll =

American politician from Colorado and Chair of the Colorado Democratic Party

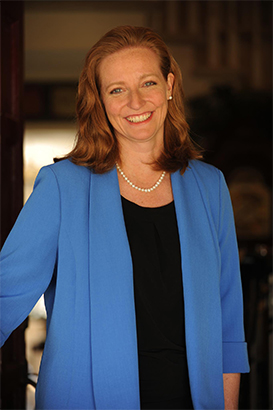

Chair of the Colorado Democratic Party
- In office March 11, 2017 – April 1, 2023
- Preceded by: Rick Palacio
- Succeeded by: Shad Murib

President of the Colorado Senate
- In office September 10, 2013 – January 7, 2015
- Preceded by: John Morse
- Succeeded by: Bill Cadman

Member of the Colorado Senate from the 29th district
- In office January 10, 2009 – January 10, 2017
- Preceded by: Bob Hagedorn
- Succeeded by: Rhonda Fields

Member of the Colorado House of Representatives from the 36th district
- In office January 10, 2005 – January 10, 2009
- Preceded by: Frank Weddig
- Succeeded by: Su Ryden

Personal details
- Born: November 24, 1971 (age 54) Denver, Colorado, U.S.
- Party: Democratic
- Education: University of Colorado, Denver (BA); University of Colorado, Boulder (JD)

Morgan Lenore Carroll (born November 24, 1971) is an American politician from Colorado who was the Chairwoman of the Colorado Democratic Party. A Democrat, Carroll represented Colorado House District 36 in the city of Aurora from 2004 to 2008, and she represented the state's 29th Senate district from 2009 to 2017. Carroll served as President of the Colorado State Senate from 2013 to 2014 and as minority leader in 2015. Carroll stepped down as minority leader in July 2015 to unsuccessfully run against incumbent Republican Mike Coffman for Colorado's 6th congressional district in the U.S. House of Representatives.

Carroll chaired the Colorado Democratic Party from 2017 to 2023. During her tenure, the party achieved significant power by gaining or controlling all statewide executive offices and the state legislature, which ultimately led to Colorado turning from a swing state into a blue state.

In addition to her legislative work, Carroll works for the law firm of Bachus & Schanker.

== Early life and education ==
Morgan Carroll was born November 24, 1971, in Denver, Colorado, to John Carroll and Rebecca Bradley. Her father was a lawyer who served as a Colorado State Representative for Adams County between 1964 and 1974. Her mother was an attorney and Carroll's partner at the mother/daughter disability and family-law firm Carroll & Bradley in Aurora from 2000 to 2010.

When Carroll was young, she helped care for her father after he was diagnosed with Parkinson's, and later, Alzheimer's. Her family experienced financial difficulties during that time.

Carroll graduated from Boulder High School in 1990. She worked various jobs, including at a gas station and fast-food restaurant, to pay for her education. She graduated from the University of Colorado Denver in 1996 and from the University of Colorado Law School in 2000.

== Political career ==
=== Colorado House of Representatives ===
Carroll first ran for the Colorado House of Representatives District 36 in 2004, defeating Republican Jim Parker 55%-45%. She won reelection in 2006 with 62% of the vote against Republican Brian R. Boney.

=== Colorado State Senate ===
Carroll first ran for the Colorado State Senate District 29 in 2008, defeating Republican Suzanne Andrews 69%-31%. She won re-election in 2012 with 59% of the vote, defeating Republican Bill Ross and Libertarian Michele Poague.

Colorado State Senate District 29 General Election, 2012
Party	Candidate	Votes	%
Democratic	Morgan Carroll	30,149	58.75
Republican	William "Bill" D. Ross II	18,745	36.53
Libertarian	Michele R. Poague	2,420	4.72
Total votes		51,314	100

=== Tenure ===
Carroll sponsored lobbying disclosure laws in 2006 and 2014. During her first year in office, she refused to discuss legislative issues with lobbyists during debate, a practice that led them to complain about her to the Democratic leadership. Her first bill, a workers compensation measure that would allow injured workers to choose their own doctors, was opposed by 240 lobbyists and ultimately failed, as did the other two bills Carroll submitted that year.

She is considered an environmentalist, and has been criticized by lobbyists for oil and gas companies.

In 2013, Carroll and fellow Democratic Representative Rhonda Fields sponsored Colorado House Bill 1229, which mandates universal background checks for gun purchases in the state.

==== Colorado State Senate Committee assignments ====
- Senate Judiciary Committee (chair)
- Executive Committee of the Legislative Council (Vice-chair)
- Legislative Council (Vice-chair)
- Senate Agriculture, Natural Resources, and Energy Committee
- Senate Health and Human Services Committee
- Police Officers and Firefighters Pension Reform Committee
- Redistricting Committee

=== 2016 U.S. Congress campaign ===
Carroll was the 2016 Democratic nominee in Colorado's 6th congressional district. She was defeated by incumbent Republican Representative Mike Coffman in the general election, in which she won 42% of the vote. Carroll was endorsed by Democratic Colorado Governor John Hickenlooper, Planned Parenthood, NARAL Pro-Choice America, EMILY's List, the International Brotherhood of Electrical Workers, and the League of Conservation Voters. A super PAC called Immigrant Voters Wins supported her, spending $10,000 as of September 2016. Carroll raised the majority of her contributions from individual donors.

Americans for Prosperity, the conservative advocacy organization backed by the Koch family, alleged that Carroll had conflicts of interest while serving in the state senate. The Denver Post rated the claim somewhat true and wrote that AFP's claim of a conflict of interest was not true in that Carroll had not benefited from the bill, but that the Colorado Ethics Board of the General Assembly had ruled that lawmakers should proactively disclose "potential" conflicts of interest.

=== Colorado Democratic Party ===
After an unsuccessful campaign to become the next congressional representative for Colorado's 6th congressional district, Carroll shortly after announced her candidacy for the chairmanship of the Colorado Democratic Party. On March 11, 2017, Carroll was elected as the next chairperson of the party. During her tenure, the party achieved unprecedented influence by gaining or controlling all statewide executive offices and the state legislature, a process that ultimately led Colorado to shift from a swing state into a blue state.

In December 2022, Carroll announced that she planned not to run for re-election for the position.

== Personal life ==
Carroll was briefly married and is now divorced. Her longtime partner and former campaign manager, Mike Weissman, is a member of the Colorado Senate. Carroll is the author of Take Back Your Government: A Citizen's Guide to Grassroots Change (2011).

Political offices
Preceded by John Morse	President of the Colorado Senate; 2013–2015	Succeeded by Bill Cadman
Party political offices
Preceded by Rick Palacio	Chair of the Colorado Democratic Party; 2017–2023	Succeeded by Shad Murib
