= Karen Middleton (politician) =

American politician (born 1966)

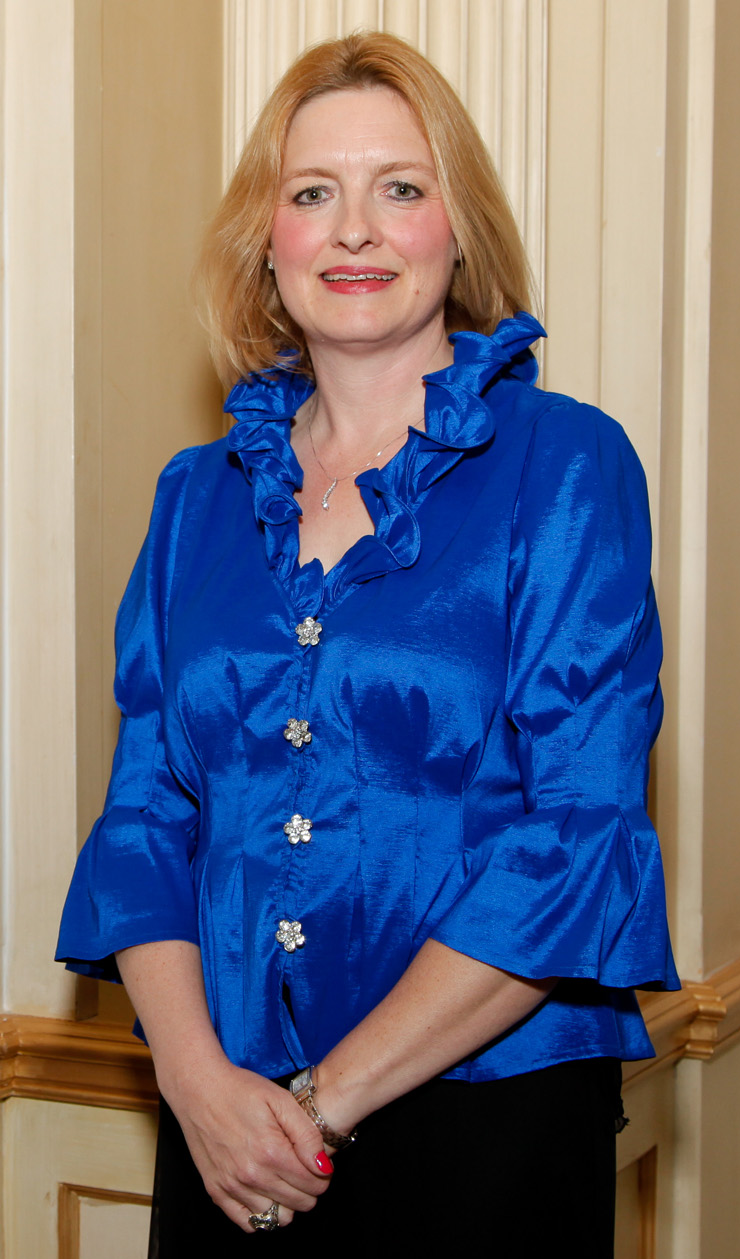

Member of the Colorado House of Representatives from the 42nd district
- In office February 13, 2008 – January 2011
- Preceded by: Michael Garcia
- Succeeded by: Rhonda Fields

Member of the Colorado State Board of Education from the 7th district
- In office November 11, 2004 – February 13, 2008
- Preceded by: Christine Baca
- Succeeded by: Jane Goff

Personal details
- Born: February 24, 1966 (age 60)
- Party: Democratic
- Spouse: Christian Overbey (2023-) Larry Beer (2001-2013)
- Education: Mount Holyoke College, University of Colorado at Denver, University of Denver
- Profession: President, Cobalt

Karen Middleton (born February 24, 1966) is an American politician who served as a member of the Colorado House of Representatives from 2004 to 2008 and 2008 to 2011.

== Background ==
Karen Middleton was born on February 24, 1966.

After a career as a development officer and project manager in the field of education, Middleton was appointed to the Colorado State Board of Education in 2004 and in 2006 won election to a two-year term.

In February 2008, Middleton was appointed as a state representative to fill the vacancy in Aurora, Colorado's District 42 left by the resignation of Rep. Michael Garcia from the Colorado House of Representatives. Middleton was elected to a full term in 2008. In the 2010 election, Middleton withdrew her candidacy to accept a position in San Francisco, CA as president of Emerge America, and was succeeded in office by Rhonda Fields.

In 2013, Middleton left her Emerge America position to accept an offer to become Executive Director of NARAL Pro-Choice Colorado, a state affiliate of NARAL Pro-Choice America. NARAL Pro-Choice Colorado returned to being an independent organization and became Cobalt in January 2020.

Middleton is a member of the Adams State University Board of Trustees. In 2023, she received the Distinguished Service Award at the CU Denver Board of Regents Awards Ceremony.

== Education ==
- B.A. in political science and women's studies, Mount Holyoke College (1988)
- M.A. in political science, University of Colorado at Denver (1996)
- M.A. in higher education, University of Denver (2007)

== Professional career ==
=== 1980s ===
Middleton earned her undergraduate degree from Mount Holyoke College in 1988, graduating with a B.A. in political science and women's studies. While in college, she served as president and vice-president of Mount Holyoke's Student Government Association and was elected baccalaureate speaker. After graduation, she worked for a year as the coordinator of regional activities at Dana Hall School, an all-girls school in Massachusetts, where she organized alumni events and groups. Afterwards, she joined the National Democratic Institute for International Affairs in Washington DC, as manager of development programs, raising funds for international programs.

=== 1990s ===
In 1992, Middleton enrolled in the graduate program at the University of Colorado at Denver. There, she co-created and co-chaired the political science graduate student association and served on the campus-wide steering committee for the Auraria Women’s Network. Middleton graduated with an M.A. in political science in 1996, with a thesis titled An Analysis of State Campaign Finance Reform. While in graduate school, she also worked as director of development for the Montessori School of Denver (from 1992 to 1994), and then as director of operations for alumni and development at the University of Denver College of Law (from 1994 to 1996), developing and managing capital and giving campaigns.

Middleton joined the staff of the University of Denver's Graduate School of International Studies in April 1996, first as Director of Admissions and Student Affairs and rising to the post of Assistant Dean for Admissions and Student Affairs, overseeing graduate student recruitment, enrollment, and management. While working in higher education administration, Middleton co-chaired the Association of Professional Schools for International Affairs Admissions Officers, attended the National Association for Women in Education's Academy of Leadership in Higher Education, and received the Woman Leader of Excellence Award from the Colorado Women’s Leadership Coalition in 1997 and the University of Denver Excellence in Education Award in 1998.

In 1997, Middleton entered the graduate program in higher education policy at the University of Denver. She spent 10 years pursuing a doctoral degree, was ABD (all but dissertation), but ultimately took a second master's and ended her graduate career.

While Middleton served in her first legislative session, she was pregnant with her first child, Zoe Grace Middleton, who was born in August 2008.

=== 2000s ===
Middleton worked full-time while pursuing her doctorate. While a graduate student, she chaired the University of Denver's Graduate Women's Council from 2000 to 2002 and was a board member of the university's alumni association from 2003 to 2004. While in the School of Education, she received its Publication Award in 2003 and Service Award in 2006.

She was also hired as manager of program consulting at eCollege in 2000, and quickly promoted to director of the Center for Internet Technology in Education. At eCollege, an online learning company specializing in online course development, she managed public affairs, online learning conferences, and consulting operations. In 2000, Middleton graduated from the Colorado Institute for Leadership Training and earned certification from the Institute for Management of Distance Education.

In 2001, Middleton joined the Western Cooperative for Educational Telecommunications, a project of the Western Interstate Commission for Higher Education, as a senior project coordinator, where she developed resources for online teaching and learning for use by K-12 schools and higher education institutions. While there, she helped create the North American Council for Online Learning.

In 2004, she spent several months in an interim position as policy director for the House Minority Office at the Colorado General Assembly, where she was involved in setting policy direction for the Democratic caucus.

In addition to her professional activities, Middleton was a board member of Colorado Women's Agenda from 1994 to 2004, serving as its president from 1995 to 1999, and was a member of the DU International Human Rights Institute/Advocacy Center Advisory Board from 1998 to 2003. She has also served on the boards of the Aurora Education Foundation (from 2003 to 2006) and the Adams 14 Education Foundation (from 2004 to 2006), on the State of Colorado's Consumer Insurance Council (from 2001 to 2003) and on the Citizen’s Advisory Committee on Housing and Community Development (in 2003).

While on the state board of education, from 2004 to 2007, Middleton ran a non-profit management firm, Karen Middleton & Associates, working with clients including the Institute of International Education, the Colorado Children’s Campaign and Up with People, focusing on education-related projects. She also taught political science part-time at Community College of Aurora, and completed a second master's degree, in higher education policy, from the University of Denver, in 2007.

In March 2007, Middleton joined ScholarCentric, an educational publishing company, as Vice President of Development. In June 2007, she was promoted to Vice President of Sales and Development.

== State Board of Education ==
Middleton first sought elected office in 2002, campaigning for an elected post on the University of Colorado Board of Regents. She lost the race to represent Colorado's 7th Congressional district to Republican Patricia Hayes, earning 49% of the popular vote.

In November 2004, following the resignation of Colorado State Board of Education member Christine Baca, a Democratic Party vacancy committee appointed Middleton to the board's 7th district seat She was elected to serve for the final two years of the unexpired term in November 2006, defeating Republican Lee Kunz with 55 percent of the popular vote.

After having criticized Colorado Education Commissioner William Moloney, chastising him as "ineffective," and calling for his resignation, in 2006, Middleton was involved in the selection of his replacement, Fountain, Colorado School Superintendent Dwight Jones, in 2007. While on the board, she also cast votes against the use of quotas as a means of fostering diversity in charter schools, advocated for the creation of a state online education coordinator, and proposed a motion to allow state funding for "fifth year" high school programs designed to help students earn associate's degrees.

In 2005, Middleton was appointed to the board of the Alliance for Quality Teaching, the advisory board of the Campaign for the Civic Mission of Schools, and the Colorado General Assembly's Interim School Finance Task Force. In 2006, she was named to the State Advisory Committee for Gifted and Talented Education. Middleton also served on the Government Affairs Committee for the National Association for State Boards of Education in 2007.

Increasingly prominent in Democratic Party circles, Middleton received the "Rising Star" Award from the Colorado Democratic Party in 2006 and was named one of The Colorado Statesman's "Movers and Shakers" in 2007.

== Legislative career ==
=== 2008 appointment and election ===
In October 2007, Middleton launched her campaign for the Colorado State House of Representatives seat being vacated by term-limited Representative Michael Garcia, centering her campaign on her experience in education issues. Following the resignation of Rep. Michael Garcia in February 2008, v Middleton announced her intention to seek a Democratic Party vacancy committee's nomination for the open seat, and was quickly viewed as the leading contender for the appointment. On February 10, the vacancy committee voted 24-3 to name Middleton to replace Garcia in the state house. She was sworn into the legislature on the morning of February 13, after having submitted her resignation from the Colorado State Board of Education, effective that same day.

Middleton stood for a full term in November 2008; she faced opposition from Libertarian Jim Frye and Republican George Carouthers. Middleton's re-election bid was endorsed by the Denver Post and the Aurora Sentinel. She ultimately won with 68% of the popular vote.

After winning a full term in November 2008, Middleton was elected Majority Caucus Chair by state house Democrats.

=== 2008 legislative session ===
After joining the Colorado General Assembly in the midst of the 2008 legislative session, Middleton was named to seats on the House Education Committee and the House State, Veterans, & Military Affairs Committee. She has named economic growth, education, and health care as her top legislative priorities for the legislative session. She has sponsored legislation to increase training standards for Colorado's Witness Protection Program and legislation signed into law to provide $5 million in funding in "Colorado Counselor Corps" funding for additional guidance counselors in struggling public schools. Middleton has also supported renaming the University of Colorado Denver Anschutz Medical Campus to add "in Aurora," reflecting the campus's physical location. After unsuccessfully lobbying the University of Colorado Board of Regents to change the name, Middleton plans to offer a bill to change the name legislatively during the 2009 session.

In September 2008, following an Aurora murder, Middleton joined with other Aurora legislators in September to call for a state investigation into how the accused perpetrator, suspected of being an illegal immigrant, was allowed to remain in the United States under current law, with an eye toward revising state laws that may have contributed to the situation.

In November 2008, Middleton received the Charter Friends Award from the Colorado League of Charter Schools.

=== 2009 legislative session ===
For the 2009 legislative session, Middleton was named to seats on the House Education Committee and the House Transportation and Energy Committee. She planned on sponsoring legislation to create a state investment fund to support services for people with developmental disabilities, a move prompted by the failure of a statewide ballot measure to raise sales taxes to fund the same services; however, Middleton later announced that she would not pursue the measure because of poor state revenue projections.

=== 2010 withdrawal from reelection campaign ===
In August 2010, Middleton withdrew from her campaign for reelection to accept a position in San Francisco, CA leading Emerge America, an organization whose mission is to recruit and train female Democratic political candidates. Because Colorado's 2010 Democratic primary already occurred, a Democratic vacancy committee met and nominated Rhonda Fields to take Middleton's place on the November ballot.

== Post-Legislature activity ==
While continuing to lead Emerge America, Middleton moved back from California to Colorado, returning to Aurora, Colorado. In January 2013, Middleton considered challenging Andrew Romanoff for the Democratic nomination for Colorado's 6th congressional district, but ultimately demurred.

In May 2013, Middleton left Emerge America to accept the Executive Director position for NARAL Pro-Choice Colorado.

Middleton continues to lead the organization as President - now known as Cobalt.

== See also ==
- NARAL Pro-Choice America
