= Rhonda Fields =

American politician

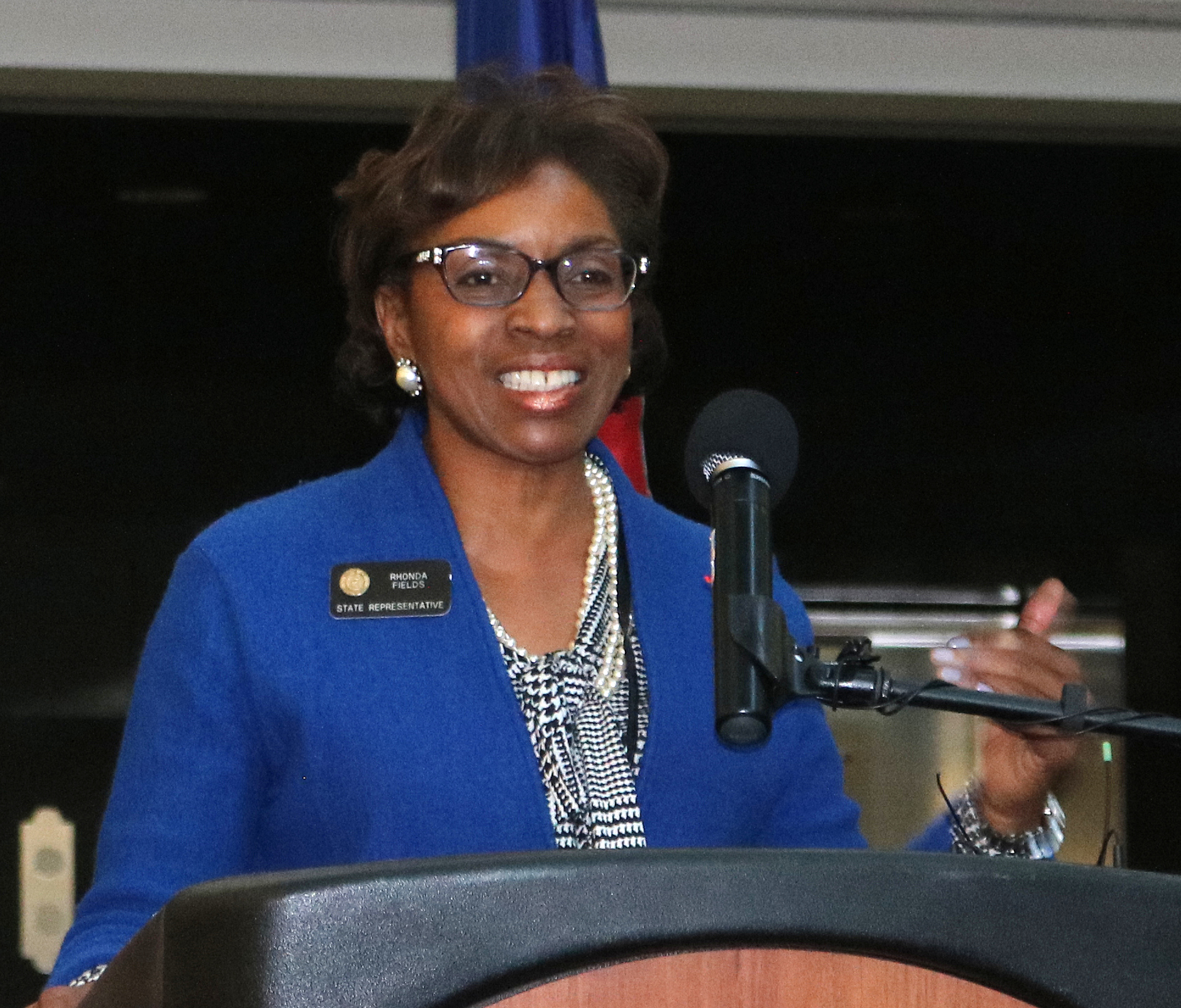

Member of the Colorado Senate from the 28th district
- In office January 9, 2023 – January 8, 2025
- Preceded by: Redistricted
- Succeeded by: Mike Weissman

Member of the Colorado Senate from the 29th district
- In office January 11, 2017 – January 9, 2023
- Preceded by: Morgan Carroll
- Succeeded by: Redistricted

Member of the Colorado House of Representatives from the 42nd district
- In office January 2011 – January 11, 2017
- Preceded by: Karen Middleton
- Succeeded by: Dominique Jackson

Personal details
- Born: Rhonda Marshall Fields
- Party: Democratic
- Education: University of Northern Colorado
- Website: www.rhondafields.com

Rhonda Marshall Fields is a Democratic politician from Colorado. She represents District 28 in the Colorado Senate. During the 2020 reapportionment process, Buckner's residence moved from senate district 29 to senate district 28. Earlier, she represented District 29 from January 2017 to January 2023. Previously, she served as member of the Colorado State House of Representatives representing District 42 from Aurora, Colorado. She was the first African American woman elected in State House District 42, as well as the first Speaker pro Tempore.

== Biography ==
Fields entered politics after her work as a victims' rights advocate in the wake of the murders of her son, Javad Fields, and his fiancée, Vivian Wolfe.

The two Colorado State University graduates were murdered on June 20, 2005, less than a week before Javad Fields planned to testify as a key witness in the murder of his best friend. In 2007 Gov. Bill Ritter appointed Rhonda Fields to the Colorado Commission on Criminal Juvenile Justice, where she worked on public safety and criminal justice issues. Fields also testified before the Colorado legislature on two successful bills, one strengthening the state's Witness Protection Programs, as well as the Javad Marshall Fields & Vivian Wolfe Witness Protection Act that is designed to develop better risk-assessment tools to elevate the safety and security of witnesses in criminal trials.

Fields serves on numerous boards, including the Safe 2 Tell Advisory Board and Voices of Victims. Her professional affiliations include Women in Government, the National Federation of Women Legislators, the Colorado Black Caucus, the National Council of Negro Women, the Urban League of Denver, the NAACP, Black Women for Political Action and Alpha Kappa Alpha, a sorority of African-American college-educated women.

In 2011, 5280 Magazine ranked Fields 37th on its list of the 50 "most powerful" people in the Denver Metro area, saying she has "gained the type of respect that politicians dream about." She also received the 2011 "Rising Star Award" of the Colorado Democratic Party, the 2011 Leadership for Healthy Communities Award from the Robert Wood Johnson Foundation, the Wilma Webb 2011 Co-Legislator of the Year presented by African American Voices, the 2011 Black Women for Political Action Award, the 2010 Martin Luther King, Jr. Humanitarian Award and the Colorado Black Chamber of Commerce President's Courage Award.

Fields is the founder of the Fields Wolfe Memorial Fund, a nonprofit, started in memory of her son Javad Fields and his fiancée, Vivian Wolfe. She has one adult daughter and four grandchildren. She is retired from United Airlines after 28 years of dedicated employment. Fields holds a Master's Degree from the University of Northern Colorado.

== Political campaigns ==
Rhonda Fields was elected to the Colorado State House three times, in 2010, 2012, and 2014. In 2016, she was elected to the Colorado Senate.

=== 2010 election ===
In 2010, State Rep. Karen Middleton withdrew from her re-election campaign in order to accept an out-of-state position. A Democratic vacancy committee then met to select a replacement candidate to appear on the November 2010 General Election ballot. Rhonda Fields was one of three candidates. She entered with the support of then-State House Speaker Terrance Carroll, incumbent Karen Middleton and she was nominated by the committee on the first ballot. She went on to win the District 42 seat, defeating Republican Sally Mounier.

Colorado State House District 42 General Election, 2010
Party	Candidate	Votes	%
Democratic	Rhonda Fields	7,102	60.62
Republican	Sally Mounier	4,614	39.38
Total votes		11,716	100

=== 2012 election ===
In 2012, Fields was re-elected.

Colorado State House District 42 General Election, 2012
Party	Candidate	Votes	%
Democratic	Rhonda Fields	16,402	73.35
Republican	Mike Donald	5,960	26.65
Total votes		22,362	100

=== 2024 election ===
On July 19, 2023, Fields, term-limited at the end of her current term, announced that she was running for the office of Arapahoe County commissioner, District 5. The position will be open because its incumbent is also term-limited.

== Legislative career ==
Fields successfully sponsored nine bills and two joint resolutions in her first legislative session. To combat childhood obesity, she sponsored legislation to require 30 minutes of physical activity a day in Colorado schools. She also led legislation to authorize the Public Utilities Commission to create a tiered electricity rate for customers with medical conditions.

=== Committee assignments ===
In the State House, Fields was assigned to the following committees:

- Local Government—Chair
- Economic Opportunity Poverty Reduction Task Force—Vice-Chair
- Education
- Health, Insurance & Environment

=== Gun control ===
In 2023, Fields supported legislation that would ban assault weapons.
