= 68th Colorado General Assembly =

Term of state legislature in Colorado, US

Colorado General Assembly
- 68th Colorado General Assembly

Type
- Type: Bicameral
- Houses: Senate; House of Representatives

History
- Preceded by: 67th Colorado General Assembly
- Succeeded by: 69th Colorado General Assembly

Leadership
- President of the Senate: Brandon Shaffer (D)
- Speaker of the House: Frank McNulty (R)

Structure
- Seats: 100
- Political groups: Democratic Party; Republican Party

Meeting place
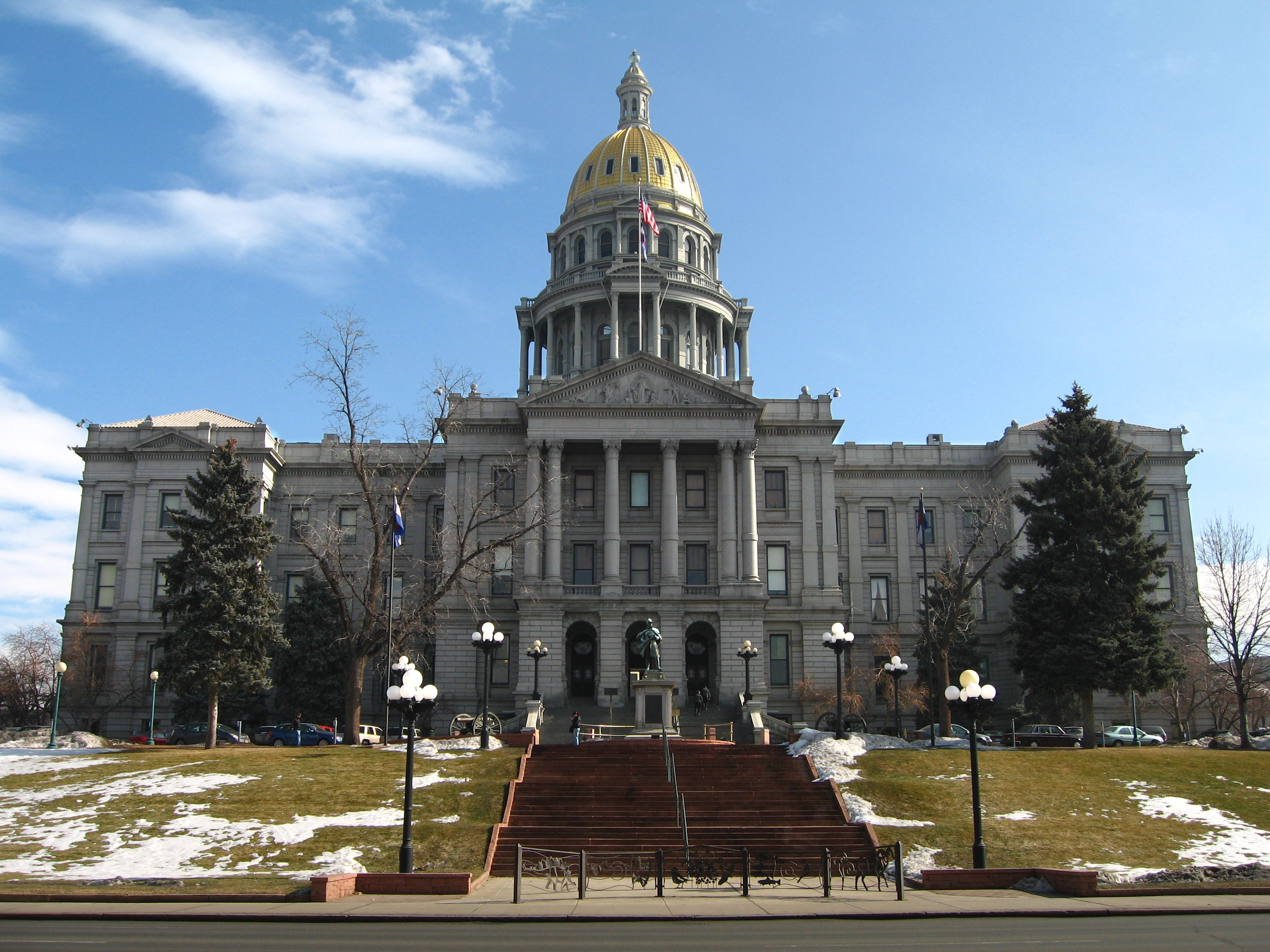
- Colorado State Capitol, Denver

Website
- http://www.leg.state.co.us/

The Sixty-eighth Colorado General Assembly was the meeting of the legislative branch of the State of Colorado, from January 12, 2011 until January 9, 2013. In the 2010 midterm elections, the Republican Party won a slim majority in the Colorado House of Representatives, while the Democratic Party kept their majority in the Colorado Senate.

== Major events and legislation ==
=== Change in partisan balance ===
Republican victories in the 2010 midterm elections resulted in a one-seat majority in the Colorado House. Three centrist Democrats from swing districts—Joe Rice, Sara Gagliardi, and Dianne Primavera—who had brokered bipartisan agreements in the 67th Colorado General Assembly were replaced by Republican challengers, leading to early fears of partisan gridlock. However, the two-year-long 33-34 partisan division also resulted in numerous temporary coalitions, prompting the Denver Post to editorialize in 2012 that "on balance, this year's regular session of the legislature was a success."

=== Budgetary measures ===
The primary constitutional duty of the General Assembly is to pass an annual appropriations measure. Frequently called "the budget" by the press or "the long bill" by legislative staffers (owing to its enormous number of pages and considerable complexity), the annual appropriation is one of the most-watched measures in any given session. The bill is drafted by the Joint Budget Committee (JBC), which is a bipartisan committee made up of House and Senate members and advised by staffers and economists.

SB11-209 was the 2011-2012 budget, passed by the 68th General Assembly in April 2011. It made an appropriation of $18 billion, of which $7 billion was from the state's General Fund. The state's governor, John Hickenlooper, vetoed several sections of the budget measure, arguing that the legislature had overstepped its constitutional authority by making staffing decisions in the bill. The House and Senate overrode the partial vetoes on May 11, 2011.

HB12-1335 was the 2012-2013 budget passed by the 68th General Assembly in late April 2012. The bill made a total appropriation of $20 billion, of which $7.7 billion was from the state's General Fund. Because of ongoing bipartisan agreements in the legislature, the measure achieved the broadest support and highest number of "yes" votes of any Colorado budget since 1995.

=== 2012 Special session ===
The 68th Colorado General Assembly was also noteworthy for having a Special Session, the first since 2006.

On the second-to-last day of the 2012 legislative session, Speaker of the House Frank McNulty and a group of Republican legislators engaged in a parliamentary filibuster intended to prevent an up-or-down vote on a civil unions bill. At the time, it was reported that a majority of the House, including five Republicans, supported the measure. Delaying the civil union bill until adjournment resulted in the bill's expiration. However, this action also resulted in 30 unrelated bills dying without a floor vote. The delay resulted in nationwide media attention and triggered a special legislative session which cost taxpayers an estimated $23,500 per day.

In the first special session of the 68th General Assembly, Speaker McNulty assigned the civil unions bill to the State, Veterans and Military Affairs Committee which functioned as a "kill committee," permanently avoiding a vote by the House. Most remaining measures followed normal procedures, however.

== Composition of Senate during 68th Colorado General Assembly ==
=== Leadership ===
Position	Senator	Party	District
President	Brandon Shaffer	Democratic	17
President pro Tempore	Betty Boyd	Democratic	21
Majority Leader	John P. Morse	Democratic	11
Assistant Majority Leader	Lois Tochtrop	Democratic	24
Majority Caucus Chair	Morgan Carroll	Democratic	29
Minority Leader	Mike Kopp	Republican	22
Assistant Minority Leader	Bill Cadman	Republican	10
Minority Caucus Chair	Mark Scheffel	Republican	4
Minority Whip	Scott Renfroe	Republican	13

=== Members of the Colorado Senate ===
District	Senator	Party	Residence
1	Greg Brophy	Republican	Wray
2	Kevin Grantham	Republican	Canon City
3	Angela Giron	Democratic	Pueblo
4	Mark Scheffel	Republican	Sedalia
5	Gail Schwartz	Democratic	Snowmass Village
6	Ellen Roberts	Republican	Durango
7	Steve King	Republican	Grand Junction
8	Jean White	Republican	Steamboat Springs
9	Kent Lambert	Republican	Colorado Springs
10	Bill Cadman	Republican	Colorado Springs
11	John Morse	Democratic	Colorado Springs
12	Keith King	Republican	Colorado Springs
13	Scott Renfroe	Republican	Greeley
14	Bob Bacon	Democratic	Fort Collins
15	Kevin Lundberg	Republican	Fort Collins
16	Jeanne Nicholson	Democratic	Golden
17	Brandon Shaffer	Democratic	Longmont
18	Rollie Heath	Democratic	Boulder
19	Evie Hudak	Democratic	Westminster
20	Cheri Jahn	Democratic	Wheat Ridge
21	Betty Boyd	Democratic	Lakewood
22	Tim Neville	Republican	Littleton
23	Shawn Mitchell	Republican	Broomfield
24	Lois Tochtrop	Democratic	Thornton
25	Mary Hodge	Democratic	Aurora
26	Linda Newell	Democratic	Littleton
27	Nancy Spence	Republican	Centennial
28	Suzanne Williams	Democratic	Aurora
29	Morgan Carroll	Democratic	Aurora
30	Ted Harvey	Republican	Parker
31	Pat Steadman	Democratic	Denver
32	Irene Aguilar	Democratic	Denver
33	Michael Johnston	Democratic	Denver
34	Lucía Guzmán	Democratic	Denver
35	Joyce Foster	Democratic	Denver

== Composition of the House during 68th Colorado General Assembly ==
=== Leaders ===
Position	Name	Party	Residence	District
Speaker of the House	Frank McNulty	Republican	Highlands Ranch	43
Speaker pro Tempore	Kevin Priola	Republican	Brighton	30
Majority Leader	Amy Stephens	Republican	Colorado Springs	20
Assistant Majority Leader	Mark Waller	Republican	Colorado Springs	15
Majority Caucus Chair	Carole Murray	Republican	Castle Rock	45
Majority Whip	B.J. Nikkel	Republican	Loveland	49
Minority Leader	Mark Ferrandino	Democratic	Denver	2
Assistant Minority Leader	Nancy Todd	Democratic	Aurora	41
Minority Caucus Chair	Lois Court	Democratic	Denver	6
Minority Whip	vacant	Democratic	n/a	n/a

=== Members ===
District	Representative	Party	Residence
1	Jeanne Labuda	Democratic	Denver
2	Mark Ferrandino	Democratic	Denver
3	Daniel Kagan	Democratic	Denver
4	Dan Pabon	Democratic	Denver
5	Crisanta Duran	Democratic	Denver
6	Lois Court	Democratic	Denver
7	Angela Williams	Democratic	Denver
8	Beth McCann	Democratic	Denver
9	Joe Miklosi	Democratic	Denver
10	Dickey Lee Hullinghorst	Democratic	Boulder
11	Jonathan Singer	Democratic	Longmont
12	Matt Jones	Democratic	Louisville
13	Claire Levy	Democratic	Boulder
14	Janak Joshi	Republican	Colorado Springs
15	Mark Waller	Republican	Colorado Springs
16	Larry Liston	Republican	Colorado Springs
17	Mark Barker	Republican	Colorado Springs
18	Pete Lee	Democratic	Colorado Springs
19	Marsha Looper	Republican	Calhan
20	Amy Stephens	Republican	Colorado Springs
21	Bob Gardner	Republican	Colorado Springs
22	Kenneth Summers	Republican	Lakewood
23	Max Tyler	Democratic	Golden
24	Sue Schafer	Democratic	Wheat Ridge
25	Cheri Gerou	Republican	Evergreen
26	Andrew Kerr	Democratic	Lakewood
27	Libby Szabo	Republican	Arvada
28	Jim Kerr	Republican	Littleton
29	Robert Ramirez	Republican	Arvada
30	Kevin Priola	Republican	Brighton
31	Judy Solano	Democratic	Brighton
32	Edward Casso	Democratic	Thornton
33	Donald Beezley	Republican	Broomfield
34	John Soper	Democratic	Westminster
35	Cherylin Peniston	Democratic	Westminster
36	Su Ryden	Democratic	Aurora
37	Spencer Swalm	Republican	Centennial
38	Kathleen Conti	Republican	Littleton
39	David Balmer	Republican	Centennial
40	Cindy Acree	Republican	Aurora
41	Nancy Todd	Democratic	Aurora
42	Rhonda Fields	Democratic	Aurora
43	Frank McNulty	Republican	Highlands Ranch
44	Chris Holbert	Republican	Parker
45	Carole Murray	Republican	Castle Rock
46	Salvatore Pace	Democratic	Pueblo
47	Keith Swerdfeger	Republican	Pueblo West
48	Glenn Vaad	Republican	Mead
49	B.J. Nikkel	Republican	Loveland
50	James Riesberg	Democratic	Greeley
51	Brian DelGrosso	Republican	Loveland
52	John Kefalas	Democratic	Fort Collins
53	Randy Fischer	Democratic	Fort Collins
54	Ray Scott	Republican	Grand Junction
55	Laura Bradford	Republican	Grand Junction
56	Christine Scanlan	Democratic	Dillon
57	Randy Baumgardner	Republican	Winter Park
58	Don Coram	Republican	Montrose
59	Paul Brown	Republican	Durango
60	Tom Massey	Republican	Poncha Springs
61	Roger Wilson	Democratic	Glenwood Springs
62	Edward Vigil	Democratic	
63	Jon Becker	Republican	Yuma
64	Wes McKinley	Democratic	Walsh
65	Jerry Sonnenberg	Republican	Sterling

== See also ==
- List of Colorado state legislatures
- Outline of Colorado
- Index of Colorado-related articles
- State of Colorado
  - Law and government of Colorado
