= 2022 Colorado Senate election =

2022 Colorado State Senate election
- November 8, 2022

17 of the 35 seats in the Colorado Senate 18 seats needed for a majority
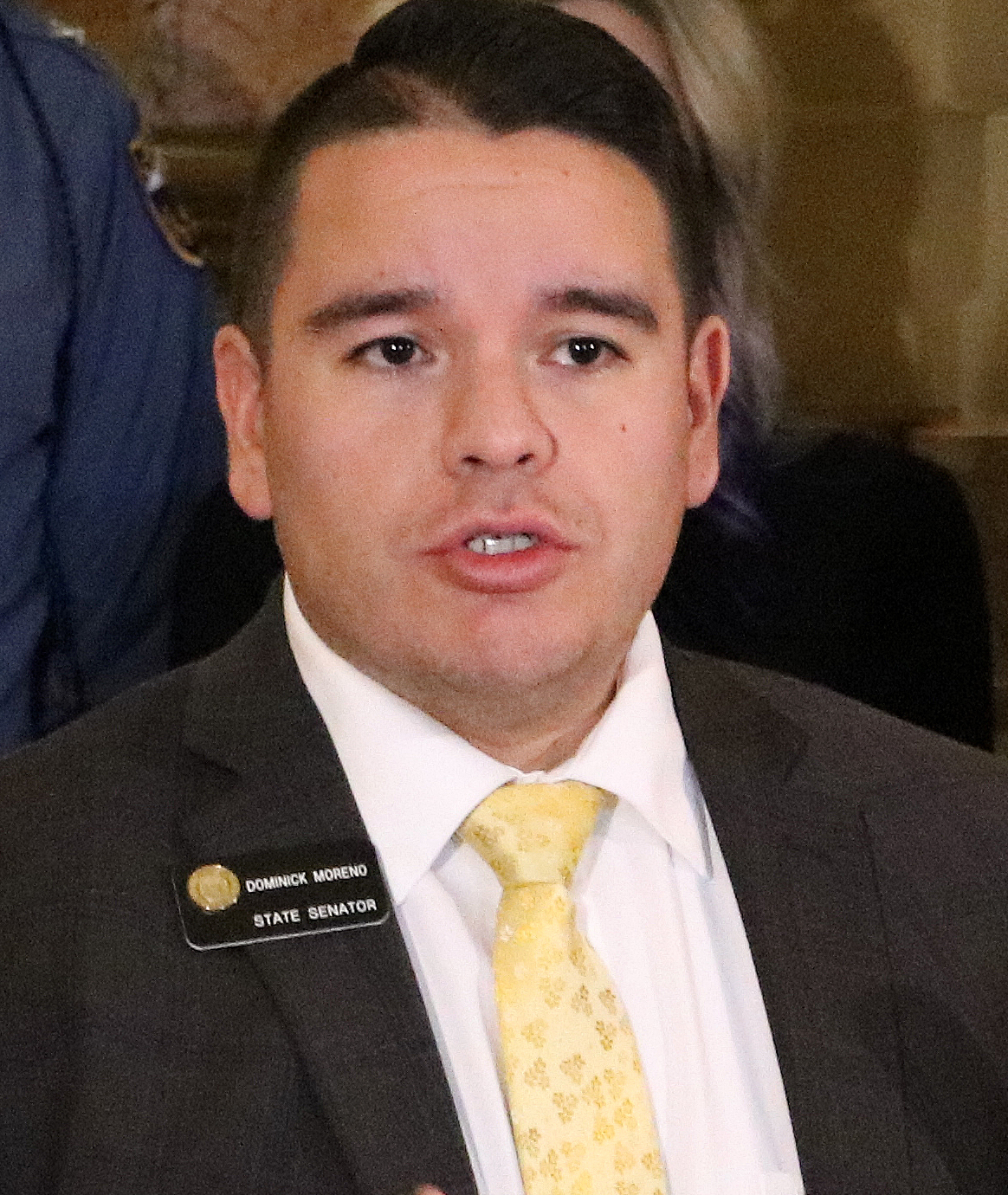

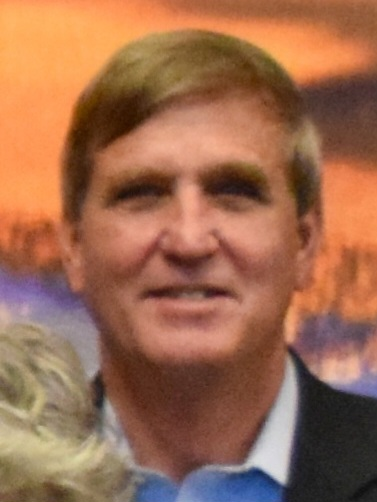
	Majority party	Minority party
Leader	Dominick Moreno	John Cooke (term-limited)
Party	Democratic	Republican
Leader's seat	21st–Denver	13th–Greeley
Last election	20 seats, 57.81%	15 seats, 39.58%
Seats before	21	14
Seats won	11	6
Seats after	23	12
Seat change	▲2	▼2
Popular vote	587,511	602,095
Percentage	49.05%	50.27%
Swing	▼8.76 pp	▲10.69 pp
- Democratic gain Democratic hold Republican hold No election 40–50% 50–60% 60–70% 70–80% >90% 50–60% 60–70% 70–80% >90%
President of the Senate before election
Steve Fenberg
Democratic
Elected President of the Senate
Steve Fenberg
Democratic

The 2022 Colorado Senate elections took place on November 8, 2022, along with elections in the State House of Representatives, with the primary elections held on June 28, 2022. Voters in 17 out of the 35 districts of the Colorado Senate elected their representative for a four-year term. It coincided with other Colorado elections of the same year and the biennial United States elections.

Democrats gained two seats increasing their majority to 23 out of 35 seats, with one seat shy of an outright supermajority. Despite winning a majority of the votes cast, the Republican Party only won 6 of the 17 seats up for election.

== Background ==
In the previous state Senate election (2020), the Democrats increased their majority to five seats. In August 2022, Republican Sen. Kevin Priola announced he was changing his party affiliation to Democratic. Therefore, for Democrats to lose their absolute majority in the Senate in this election, Republicans and other parties needed to gain at least four more seats.

This was the first election with the districts drawn based on the 2020 census. Due to this, some districts did not have incumbents, as they chose to run in other districts that were not up for election in 2022.

== Incumbents not seeking re-election ==
One Democratic and four Republican incumbents were term-limited and prohibited from seeking a consecutive third term. Under the laws for the state Senate, for terms to be considered non-consecutive, there needs to be a gap of at least four years between them.

=== Democrats ===
- District 5: Kerry Donovan was term-limited.
- District 11: Pete Lee retired.
- District 16: Tammy Story retired to run for state representative from District 25.
- District 22: Brittany Pettersen retired to run for U. S. representative from Colorado's 7th congressional district.

=== Republicans ===
- District 1: Jerry Sonnenberg was term-limited.
- District 6: Don Coram retired to run for U. S. representative from Colorado's 3rd congressional district.
- District 7: Ray Scott was term-limited.
- District 13: John Cooke was term-limited.
- District 30: Chris Holbert was term-limited, then resigned on May 31, 2022.

== Predictions ==
Source	Ranking	As of
Sabato's Crystal Ball	Likely D	May 19, 2022

== Results ==
Popular vote
**Republican**	50.27%
Democratic	49.06%
Other	0.67%

Senate seats
**Democratic**	65.71%
Republican	34.29%

District	Incumbent	Party	Elected	Party
1	Jerry Sonnenberg^{†}	Rep	Byron Pelton	Rep
3	Nick Hinrichsen	Dem	Nick Hinrichsen	Dem
4	Jim Smallwood	Rep	Mark Baisley	Rep
7	Ray Scott^{†}	Rep	Janice Rich	Rep
8	Bob Rankin	Rep	**Dylan Roberts**	**Dem**
9	Paul Lundeen	Rep	Paul Lundeen	Rep
11	Pete Lee^{†}	Dem	**Tony Exum**	**Dem**
11	Dennis Hisey	Rep	**Tony Exum**	**Dem**
15	Rob Woodward	Rep	**Janice Marchman**	**Dem**
20	Rachael Zenzinger	Dem	Lisa A. Cutter	Dem
22	Jessie Danielson	Dem	Jessie Danielson	Dem
22	Brittany Pettersen^{†}	Dem	Jessie Danielson	Dem
24	No incumbent		Kyle Mullica	Dem
25	Faith Winter	Dem	Faith Winter	Dem
27	Chris Kolker	Dem	Tom Sullivan	Dem
30	Kevin Van Winkle	Rep	Kevin Van Winkle	Rep
32	Robert Rodriguez	Dem	Robert Rodriguez	Dem
34	Julie Gonzales	Dem	Julie Gonzales	Dem
35	Cleave Simpson	Rep	Rod Pelton	Rep

† - Incumbent not seeking re-election

Italics - Incumbent redistricted to different district

Bold - gain

== Closest races ==
Seats where the margin of victory was under 10%:

1. District 15, 1.2% gain
2. District 3, 2.58%
3. District 11, 5.46% gain
4. District 30, 7.64%
5. District 27, 9.78%

== Detailed results ==
=== District 1 ===
Republican primary
Party	Candidate	Votes	%
Republican	Byron Pelton	23,142	100.0
Total votes		23,142	100.0

2022 Colorado Senate election, 1st District
Party	Candidate	Votes	%
Republican	Byron Pelton	53,199	100%
Total votes		53,199	100%
Republican hold			

=== District 3 ===
Democratic primary
Party	Candidate	Votes	%
Democratic	Nick Hinrichsen (incumbent)	15,560	100.0
Total votes		15,560	100.0

Republican primary
Party	Candidate	Votes	%
Republican	Stephen Varela	13,130	100.0
Total votes		13,130	100.0

2022 Colorado Senate election, 3rd District
Party	Candidate	Votes	%
Democratic	Nick Hinrichsen (incumbent)	33,795	51.29%
Republican	Stephen Varela	32,090	48.71%
Total votes		65,885	100%
Democratic hold			

=== District 4 ===
Democratic primary
Party	Candidate	Votes	%
Democratic	Jeff Ravage	13,811	100.0
Total votes		13,811	100.0

Republican primary
Party	Candidate	Votes	%
Republican	Mark Baisley	26,887	100.0
Total votes		26,887	100.0

2022 Colorado Senate election, 4th District
Party	Candidate	Votes	%
Republican	Mark Baisley	55,595	60.84%
Democratic	Jeff Ravage	35,789	39.16%
Total votes		91,384	100%
Republican hold			

=== District 7 ===
Republican primary
Party	Candidate	Votes	%
Republican	Janice Rich	28,026	100.0
Total votes		28,026	100.0

Democratic primary
Party	Candidate	Votes	%
Democratic	David Stahlke	8,694	100.0
Total votes		8,694	100.0

2022 Colorado Senate election, 7th District
Party	Candidate	Votes	%
Republican	Janice Rich	52,696	70.06%
Democratic	David Stahlke	22,520	29.94%
Total votes		75,216	100%
Republican hold			

=== District 8 ===
Republican Primary
Party	Candidate	Votes	%
Republican	Matt Solomon	13,492	100.0
Total votes		13,492	100.0

Democratic Primary
Party	Candidate	Votes	%
Democratic	Dylan Roberts	12,661	100.0
Total votes		12,661	100.0

2022 Colorado Senate election, 8th District
Party	Candidate	Votes	%
Democratic	Dylan Roberts	40,765	55.70
Republican	Matt Solomon	32,427	44.30
Total votes		73,192	100.00%

=== District 9 ===
Democratic primary
Party	Candidate	Votes	%
Democratic	Arik Dougherty	10,968	100.0
Total votes		10,968	100.0

Republican primary
Party	Candidate	Votes	%
Republican	Paul Lundeen (incumbent)	15,385	69.7
Republican	Lynda Zamora Wilson	6,675	30.3
Total votes		22,060	100.0

2022 Colorado Senate election, 9th District
Party	Candidate	Votes	%
Republican	Paul Lundeen (incumbent)	50,266	62.31
Democratic	Arik Dougherty	28,327	35.12
Libertarian	Stephen Darnell	2,075	2.57
Total votes		80,668	100.00%

=== District 11 ===
Democratic primary
Party	Candidate	Votes	%
Democratic	Tony Exum	3,990	54.6
Democratic	Yolanda L. Avila	3,318	45.4
Total votes		7,308	100.0

Republican primary
Party	Candidate	Votes	%
Republican	Dennis Hisey (incumbent)	8,946	100.0
Total votes		8,946	100.0

2022 Colorado Senate election, 11th District
Party	Candidate	Votes	%
Democratic	Tony Exum	20,258	49.94
Republican	Dennis Hisey (incumbent)	18,042	44.48
Libertarian	Daryl Kuiper	2,264	5.58
Total votes		40,564	100.00

=== District 15 ===
Democratic primary
Party	Candidate	Votes	%
Democratic	Janice Marchman	16,593	100.0
Total votes		16,593	100.0

Republican primary
Party	Candidate	Votes	%
Republican	Rob Woodward (incumbent)	19,942	100.0
Total votes		19,942	100.0

2022 Colorado Senate election, 15th District
Party	Candidate	Votes	%
Republican	Rob Woodward (incumbent)	42,054	49.4
Democratic	Janice Marchman	43,068	50.6
Total votes		85,122	100

=== District 20 ===
Democratic primary
Party	Candidate	Votes	%
Democratic	Lisa Cutter	17,450	100.0
Total votes		17,450	100.0

Republican primary
Party	Candidate	Votes	%
Republican	Tim Walsh	17,691	100.0
Total votes		17,691	100.0

2022 Colorado Senate election, 20th District
Party	Candidate	Votes	%
Democratic	Lisa Cutter		
Republican	Tim Walsh		
Total votes			

=== District 22 ===
Democratic primary
Party	Candidate	Votes	%
Democratic	Jessie Danielson (incumbent)	16,478	100.0
Total votes		16,478	100.0

Republican primary
Party	Candidate	Votes	%
Republican	Colby Drechsel	10,257	100.0
Total votes		10,257	100.0

2022 Colorado Senate election, 22nd District
Party	Candidate	Votes	%
Democratic	Jessie Danielson (incumbent)		
Republican	Colby Drechsel		
Total votes			

=== District 24 ===
Republican primary
Party	Candidate	Votes	%
Republican	Courtney Potter	9,642	100.0
Total votes		9,642	100.0

Democratic primary
Party	Candidate	Votes	%
Democratic	Kyle Mullica	11,499	100.0
Total votes		11,499	100.0

2022 Colorado Senate election, 24th District
Party	Candidate	Votes	%
Democratic	Kyle Mullica		
Republican	Courtney Potter		
Total votes			

=== District 25 ===
Republican primary
Party	Candidate	Votes	%
Republican	Melody Peotter	12,038	100.0
Total votes		12,038	100.0

Democratic primary
Party	Candidate	Votes	%
Democratic	Faith Winter (incumbent)	16,842	100.0
Total votes		16,842	100.0

2022 Colorado Senate election, 25th District
Party	Candidate	Votes	%
Democratic	Faith Winter (incumbent)	43,435	61.49
Republican	Melody Peotter	23,207	38.51
Total votes		66,642	100.0

=== District 27 ===
Republican primary
Party	Candidate	Votes	%
Republican	Tom Kim	8,129	70.2
Republican	JulieMarie A. Shepherd Macklin	3,447	29.8
Total votes		11,576	100.0

Democratic primary
Party	Candidate	Votes	%
Democratic	Tom Sullivan	13,209	100.0
Total votes		13,209	100.0

2022 Colorado Senate election, 27th District
Party	Candidate	Votes	%
Democratic	Tom Sullivan		
Republican	Tom Kim		
Total votes			

=== District 30 ===
Republican primary
Party	Candidate	Votes	%
Republican	Kevin Van Winkle (incumbent)	19,925	100.0
Total votes		19,925	100.0

Democratic primary
Party	Candidate	Votes	%
Democratic	Braeden Miguel	13,290	100.0
Total votes		13,290	100.0

2022 Colorado Senate election, 30th District
Party	Candidate	Votes	%
Republican	Kevin Van Winkle (incumbent)	46,751	53.82
Democratic	Braeden Miguel	40,122	46.18
Total votes		86,873	100.00

=== District 32 ===
Republican primary
Party	Candidate	Votes	%
Republican	Dean Flanders	5,520	100.0
Total votes		5,520	100.0

Democratic primary
Party	Candidate	Votes	%
Democratic	Robert Rodriguez (incumbent)	18,157	100.0
Total votes		18,157	100.0

2022 Colorado Senate election, 32nd District
Party	Candidate	Votes	%
Democratic	Robert Rodriguez (incumbent)		
Republican	Dean Flanders		
Total votes			

=== District 34 ===
Democratic primary
Party	Candidate	Votes	%
Democratic	Julie Gonzales (incumbent)	17,279	100.0
Total votes		17,279	100.0

2022 Colorado Senate election, 34th District
Party	Candidate	Votes	%
Democratic	Julie Gonzales (incumbent)		100.0
Total votes			100.0

=== District 35 ===
Republican primary
Party	Candidate	Votes	%
Republican	Rod Pelton	29,062	100.0
Total votes		29,062	100.0

Democratic primary
Party	Candidate	Votes	%
Democratic	Travis Nelson	8,691	100.0
Total votes		8,691	100.0

2022 Colorado Senate election, 35th District
Party	Candidate	Votes	%
Democratic	Travis Nelson		
Republican	Rod Pelton		
Total votes			
