= 2024 Colorado Senate election =

- November 5, 2024

18 of the 35 seats in the Colorado Senate 18 seats needed for a majority
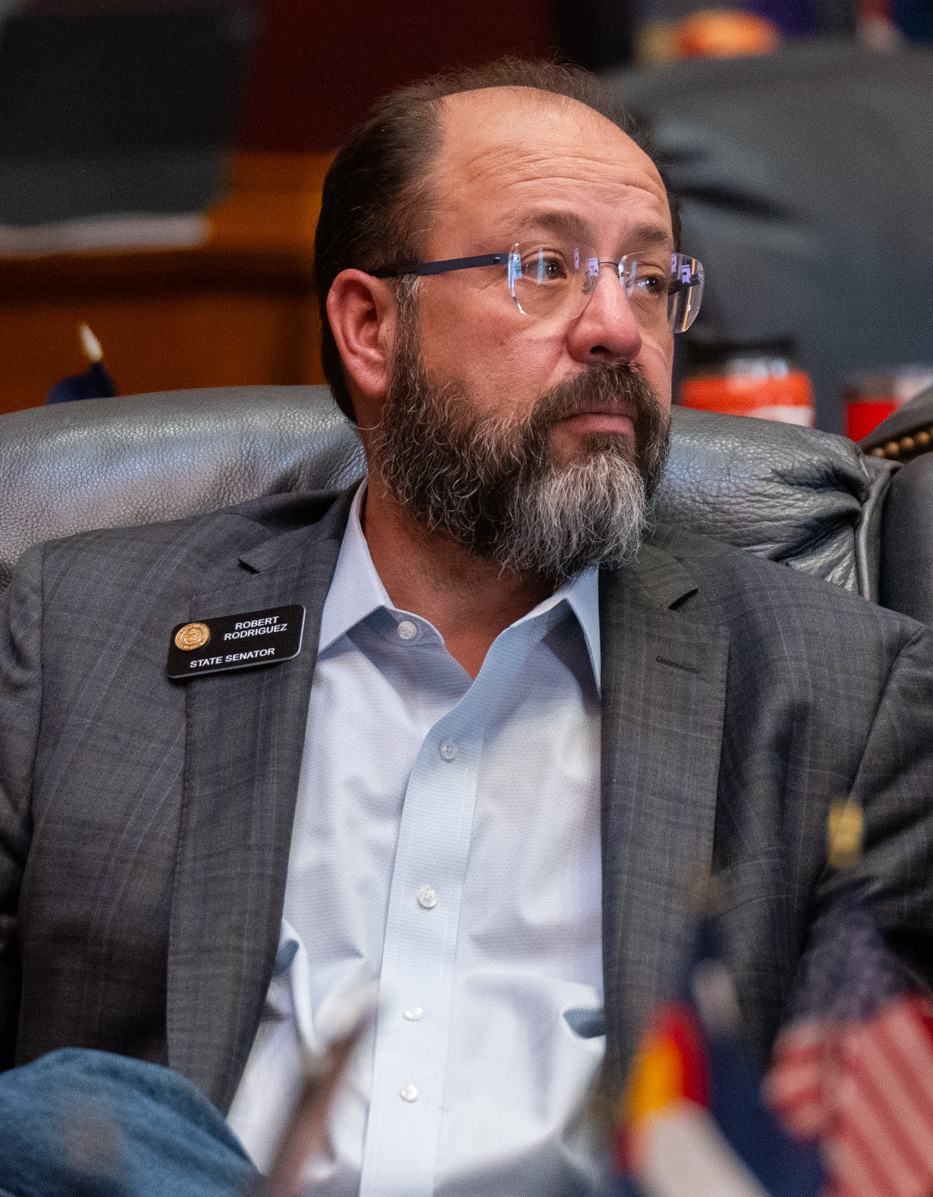

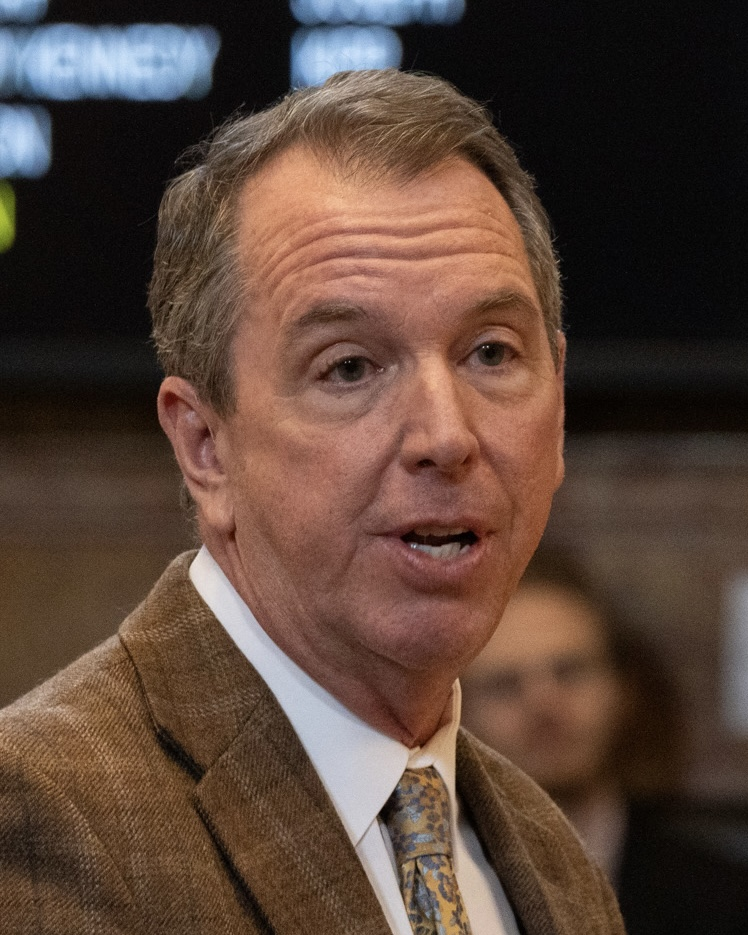
	Majority party	Minority party
Leader	Robert Rodriguez	Paul Lundeen
Party	Democratic	Republican
Leader since	September 8, 2023	January 9, 2023
Leader's seat	32nd–Denver	9th–Colorado Springs
Last election	11 seats, 49.05%	6 seats, 50.27%
Seats before	23	12
Seats won	12	6
Seats after	23	12
Seat change	Steady	Steady
Popular vote	817,303	594,858
Percentage	56.35%	41.01%
Swing	▲7.30 pp	▼9.26 pp
- Democratic hold Democratic gain Republican hold Republican gain No election 40–50% 50–60% 60–70% 80–90% >90% 50–60% 60–70% >90%
President of the Senate before election
Steve Fenberg
Democratic
Elected President of the Senate
James Coleman
Democratic

The 2024 Colorado Senate elections took place on November 5, 2024, with the primary elections being held on June 25, 2024. Voters in 18 out of the 35 districts of the state Senate elected their representative for a four-year term. This election coincided with other Colorado elections of the same year and the biennial United States elections.

== Background ==
In the 2020 US Presidential Election, Joe Biden won 25 districts, while Donald Trump won 10. Republicans represented three districts where Biden had won in 2020: District 6 (Biden +2.18%), represented by Cleave Simpson; District 12 (Biden +3.61%), represented by Bob Gardner; and District 30 (Biden +1.47%), represented by Kevin Van Winkle. Additionally, one Democrat, Kevin Priola, represented District 13, which Trump won by 3.78%.

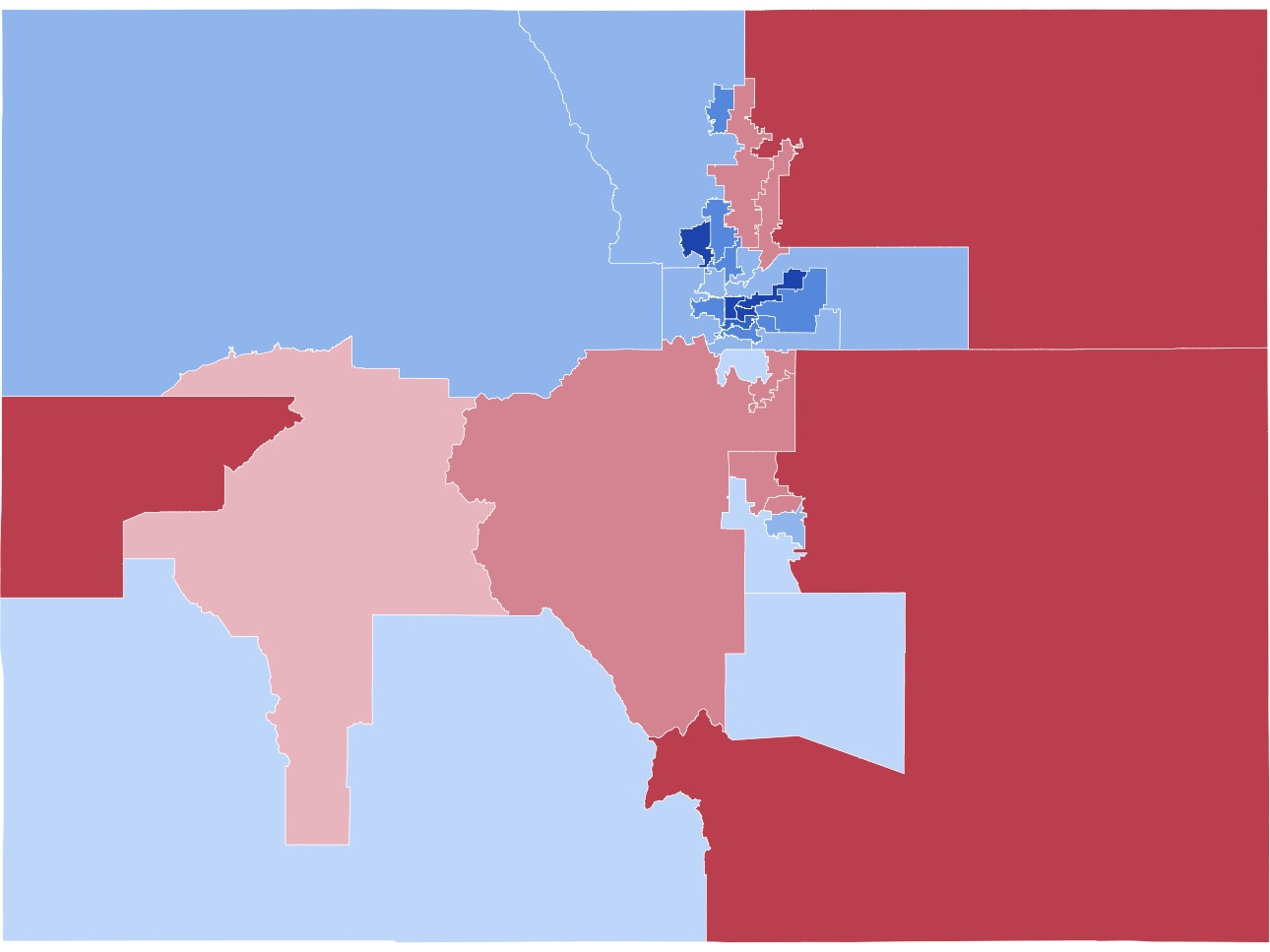
Biden 40–50% 50–60% 60–70% 70–80% 80-90% / Trump 40-50% 50–60% 60–70%

== Retirements ==
=== Democrats ===
1. District 13: Kevin Priola is term-limited.
2. District 14: Joann Ginal is term-limited.
3. District 18: Steve Fenberg is term-limited.
4. District 19: Rachel Zenzinger is term-limited (ran for Jefferson County Commission).
5. District 28: Rhonda Fields is term-limited (ran for Arapahoe County Commission).

=== Republicans ===
1. District 2: Jim Smallwood is term-limited.
2. District 5: Perry Will retired to run for Garfield County Commission.
3. District 12: Bob Gardner is term-limited.

== Predictions ==
=== Statewide ===
Source	Ranking	As of
CNalysis	Solid D	August 10, 2024
Sabato's Crystal Ball	Safe D	June 18, 2024

=== Competitive districts ===
District	Incumbent	Last Result	CNalysis October 13, 2024
5th	Perry Will	N/A (Note: Will was appointed to his seat following the resignation of Bob Rankin.)	Tilt R
6th	Cleave Simpson	60.12% R	Tossup
12th	Bob Gardner	58.35% R	Lean D (flip)
13th	Kevin Priola	50.84% R (Note: Priola switched parties in 2021 after the January 6 United States Capitol attack.)	Very Likely R (flip)

== Closest races ==
Seats where the margin of victory was under 10%:

1. District 12, 1.35% (flip)
2. District 21, 2.22%
3. District 16, 4.31%
4. District 5, 4.46%

== Results by district ==
=== District 2 ===
2024 Colorado Senate election, 2nd District
Party	Candidate	Votes	%
Republican	Lisa Frizell	63,181	60.68%
Democratic	Jennifer Brady	38,261	36.75%
Libertarian	Caryn Ann Harlos	2,672	2.57%
Total votes		104,114	100%
Republican hold			

=== District 5 ===
2024 Colorado Senate election, 5th District
Party	Candidate	Votes	%
Republican	Marc Catlin	46,310	52.23%
Democratic	Cole Buerger	42,357	47.77%
Total votes		88,667	100%
Republican hold			

=== District 6 ===
2024 Colorado Senate election, 6th District
Party	Candidate	Votes	%
Republican	Cleave Simpson (incumbent)	52,131	55.91%
Democratic	Vivian Smotherman	41,108	44.09%
Total votes		93,239	100%
Republican hold			

Incumbent Republican Cleave Simpson was re-elected with an 11.8% margin and carried Saguache County by 6.4%.

=== District 10 ===
2024 Colorado Senate election, 10th District
Party	Candidate	Votes	%
Republican	Larry Liston (incumbent)	49,886	57.05%
Democratic	Ryan Howard Lucas	34,352	39.29%
Libertarian	John Hjersman	3,198	3.66%
Total votes		87,436	100%
Republican hold			

=== District 12 ===
2024 Colorado Senate election, 12th District
Party	Candidate	Votes	%
Democratic	Marc Snyder	36,971	48.90%
Republican	Stan VanderWerf	35,872	47.45%
Libertarian	John Michael Angle	2,755	3.64%
Total votes		75,598	100%
Democratic gain from Republican			

=== District 13 ===
2024 Colorado Senate election, 13th District
Party	Candidate	Votes	%
Republican	Scott Bright	34,045	56.64%
Democratic	Matt Johnston	26,060	43.36%
Total votes		60,105	100%
Republican gain from Democratic			

=== District 14 ===
2024 Colorado Senate election, 14th District
Party	Candidate	Votes	%
Democratic	Cathy Kipp	58,742	68.24%
Republican	Phoebe McWilliams	24,085	27.98%
Libertarian	Jeffrey Brosius	3,259	3.79%
Total votes		86,086	100%
Democratic hold			

=== District 16 ===
2024 Colorado Senate election, 16th District
Party	Candidate	Votes	%
Democratic	Chris Kolker (incumbent)	53,740	52.15%
Republican	Robyn Carnes	49,302	47.84%
Libertarian	Bennett Rutledge (write-in)	12	0.01%
Total votes		103,054	100%
Democratic hold			

=== District 17 ===
2024 Colorado Senate election, 17th District
Party	Candidate	Votes	%
Democratic	Sonya Jaquez Lewis (incumbent)	63,308	66.77%
Republican	Tom Van Lone	31,509	33.23%
Total votes		94,817	100%
Democratic hold			

=== District 18 ===
2024 Colorado Senate election, 18th District
Party	Candidate	Votes	%
Democratic	Judy Amabile	73,150	90.47%
Unity	Gary Swing	7,704	9.53%
Total votes		80,854	100%
Democratic hold			

=== District 19 ===
2024 Colorado Senate election, 19th District
Party	Candidate	Votes	%
Democratic	Lindsey Daugherty	54,900	56.13%
Republican	Sam Bandimere	40,596	41.51%
Libertarian	Ryan VanGundy	2,305	2.36%
Total votes		97,801	100%
Democratic hold			

=== District 21 ===
2024 Colorado Senate election, 21st District
Party	Candidate	Votes	%
Democratic	Dafna Michaelson Jenet (incumbent)	33,438	51.11%
Republican	Frederick Alfred Jr	31,982	48.89%
Total votes		65,420	100%
Democratic hold			

=== District 23 ===
2024 Colorado Senate election, 23rd District
Party	Candidate	Votes	%
Republican	Barbara Kirkmeyer (incumbent)	75,608	97.76%
Democratic	Joseph Bobko (write-in)	1,731	2.24%
Total votes		77,339	100%
Republican hold			

=== District 26 ===
2024 Colorado Senate election, 26th District
Party	Candidate	Votes	%
Democratic	Jeff Bridges (incumbent)	48,296	62.03%
Republican	Bob Lane	27,756	35.65%
Unity	Meredith Ryan	1,806	2.32%
Total votes		77,858	100%
Democratic hold			

=== District 28 ===
2024 Colorado Senate election, 28th District
Party	Candidate	Votes	%
Democratic	Mike Weissman	35,064	63.51%
Republican	Pedro Espinoza	20,143	36.49%
Total votes		55,207	100%
Democratic hold			

=== District 29 ===
2024 Colorado Senate election, 29th District
Party	Candidate	Votes	%
Democratic	Janet Buckner (incumbent)	45,658	100%
Total votes		45,658	100%
Democratic hold			

=== District 31 ===
2024 Colorado Senate election, 31st District
Party	Candidate	Votes	%
Democratic	Chris Hansen (incumbent)	75,769	83.92%
Libertarian	David Aitken	14,515	16.08%
Total votes		90,284	100%
Democratic hold			

=== District 33 ===
2024 Colorado Senate election, 33rd District
Party	Candidate	Votes	%
Democratic	James Coleman (incumbent)	56,129	81.84%
Republican	Max Minnig	12,452	18.16%
Total votes		68,581	100%
Democratic hold			
