= List of Colorado legislatures =

Coordinates: 38.9972°N 105.5478°W

The location of the State of Colorado in the United States of America.

This is a list of the legislatures of the U.S. state of Colorado. The Legislative Assembly of the Territory of Colorado met from the creation of the territory in 1861 until statehood on August 1, 1876. The General Assembly of the State of Colorado has convened many times since statehood.

== Legislative Assembly of the Territory of Colorado ==
The Legislative Assembly of the Territory of Colorado did not number its legislatures; rather, it numbered its sessions, which occurred occasionally from 1861 to 1876.

Session	Location(s)	Session began	Session ended	House journal link	Territorial Council journal link
First Regular Session	Denver	September 9, 1861	November 7, 1861		
Second Session	Colorado City; Denver	July 7, 1862	August 15, 1862		
Third Session	Golden City; Denver	February 1, 1864	March 11, 1864		
Fourth Session	Golden City	January 2, 1865	February 10, 1865		
Fifth Session	Golden City; Denver	January 1, 1866	February 9, 1866		
Sixth Session	Golden City	December 3, 1866	January 11, 1867		
Seventh Session	Golden City; Denver	December 2, 1867	January 10, 1868		
Eighth Session	Denver	January 3, 1870	February 11, 1870		
Ninth Session	Denver	January 1, 1872	February 9, 1872		
Tenth Session	Denver	January 5, 1874	February 13, 1874	(not available)	
Eleventh Session	Denver	January 3, 1876	February 11, 1876		

=== 1865 Territorial Legislature ===
For a brief time in 1865, Colorado had an approved state constitution, and selected a legislature and other elected officials. The legislature briefly convened, believing that their statehood had been approved. However, Andrew Johnson vetoed the corresponding enabling act, and the body that met as the state legislature was disbanded. This legislature met from December 12 through December 19, 1865.

== General Assembly of the State of Colorado ==
The state legislature has met in Denver, Colorado since its founding. "The first legislative session met from November 1, 1876, through March 20, 1877, and the succeeding sessions met every two years in the odd numbered years: 1879, 1881, 1883, etc., until 1950."

"Colorado general elections are held on the first Tuesday, following the first Monday in November in every even-numbered year, with the exception of the first election in October 1876. Since 1876, representatives have been elected every two years and senators have been elected every four years on a staggered basis."

General Assembly	Session	Session began	Session ended	House journal link	Senate journal link	Last election
1st		November 1, 1876	March 20, 1877			October 1876
2nd		January 1, 1879	February 9, 1879			November 1878
3rd		January 5, 1881	February 13, 1881			November 1880
4th	Regular session	January 3, 1883	February 11, 1883			November 1882
4th	Joint session	January 17, 1883	February 27, 1883		(N/A)	
5th		January 7, 1885	April 6, 1885			November 1884
6th		January 5, 1887	April 4, 1887			November 1886
7th		1889				November 1888
8th		1891				November 1890
9th		1893				November 1892
10th		1895				November 1894
11th		1897				November 1896
12th		1899				November 1898
13th		1901				November 1900
14th		1903				November 1902
15th		1905				November 1904
16th		1907				November 1906
17th		1909				November 1908
18th		1911				November 1910
19th		1913				November 1912
20th		1915				November 1914
21st		1917				November 1916
22nd		1919				November 1918
23rd		1921				November 1920
24th		1923				November 1922
25th		1925				November 1924
26th		1927				November 1926
27th		1929				November 1928
28th		1931				November 1930
29th		1933				November 1932
30th		1935				November 1934
31st		1937				November 1936
32nd		1939				November 1938
33rd		1941				November 1940
34th		1942				
35th		1944				November 1942
36th		1947				November 1946
37th		1949				November 1948
38th		1951				November 1950
39th		1953				November 1952
40th		1955				November 1954
41st		1957				November 1956
42nd		1959				November 1958
43rd		1961				November 1960
44th		1963				November 1962
45th		1965				November 1964
46th		1967				November 1966
47th		1969				November 1968
48th		1971				November 1970
49th		1973				November 1972
50th		1975				November 1974
51st		1977				November 1976
52nd		1979				November 1978
53rd		1981				November 1980
54th		1983				November 1982
55th		1985				November 1984
56th		1987				November 1986
57th		1989				November 1988
58th		1991				November 1990
59th		1993				November 1992
60th		1995				November 1994
61st		1997				November 1996
62nd		1999				November 1998
63rd		2001				November 2000
64th		2003				November 2002
65th		2005				November 2004
66th		2007				November 2006
67th	First Regular Session	January 7, 2009	May 6, 2009			November 2008
67th	Second Regular Session	January 13, 2010	May 12, 2010			
68th	First Regular Session	January 12, 2011	May 11, 2011			November 2010
68th	Second Regular Session	January 11, 2012	May 9, 2012			
68th	First Extraordinary Session	May 14, 2012	May 16, 2012			
69th	First Regular Session	January 9, 2013	May 8, 2013			November 2012
69th	Second Regular Session	January 8, 2014	May 7, 2014			
70th	First Regular Session	January 7, 2015	May 6, 2015			November 2014: Senate
70th	Second Regular Session	January 13, 2016	May 11, 2016			
71st	First Regular Session	January 11, 2017	May 10, 2017			November 2016: House, Senate
71st	First Extraordinary Session	October 2, 2017	October 3, 2017		(None found)	
71st	Second Regular Session	January 10, 2018	May 9, 2018			
72nd	First Regular Session	January 4, 2019	May 3, 2019			November 2018: House, Senate
72nd	Second Regular Session	January 8, 2020	June 15, 2020			
72nd	First Extraordinary Session	November 30, 2020	December 2, 2020			
73rd		2021				November 2020: House, Senate
74th		2023				November 2022: House, Senate
75th	First Regular Session	January 8, 2025	May 7, 2025	60		November 2024: House, Senate
75th	First Extraordinary Session	August 21, 2025	August 26, 2025	61		
75th	Second Regular Session	January 14, 2026	May 13, 2026	62		

== See also ==
- Colorado General Assembly
- Legislative staff in Colorado
- Bibliography of Colorado
- Geography of Colorado
- History of Colorado
- Index of Colorado-related articles
- List of Colorado-related lists
- Outline of Colorado
- Lists of United States state legislative sessions
