= Colorado's 25th Senate district =

American legislative district

Colorado's 25th State Senate district
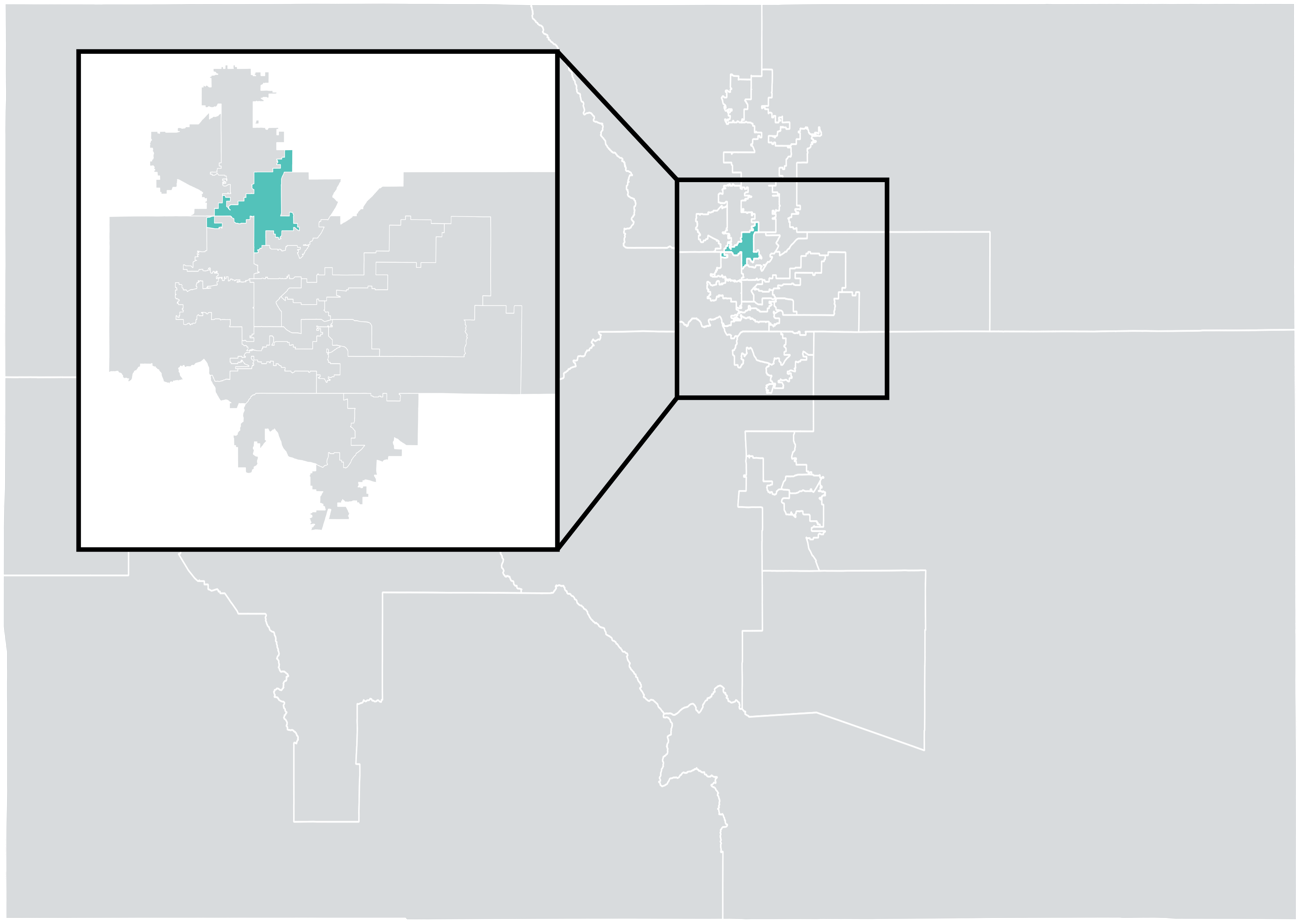
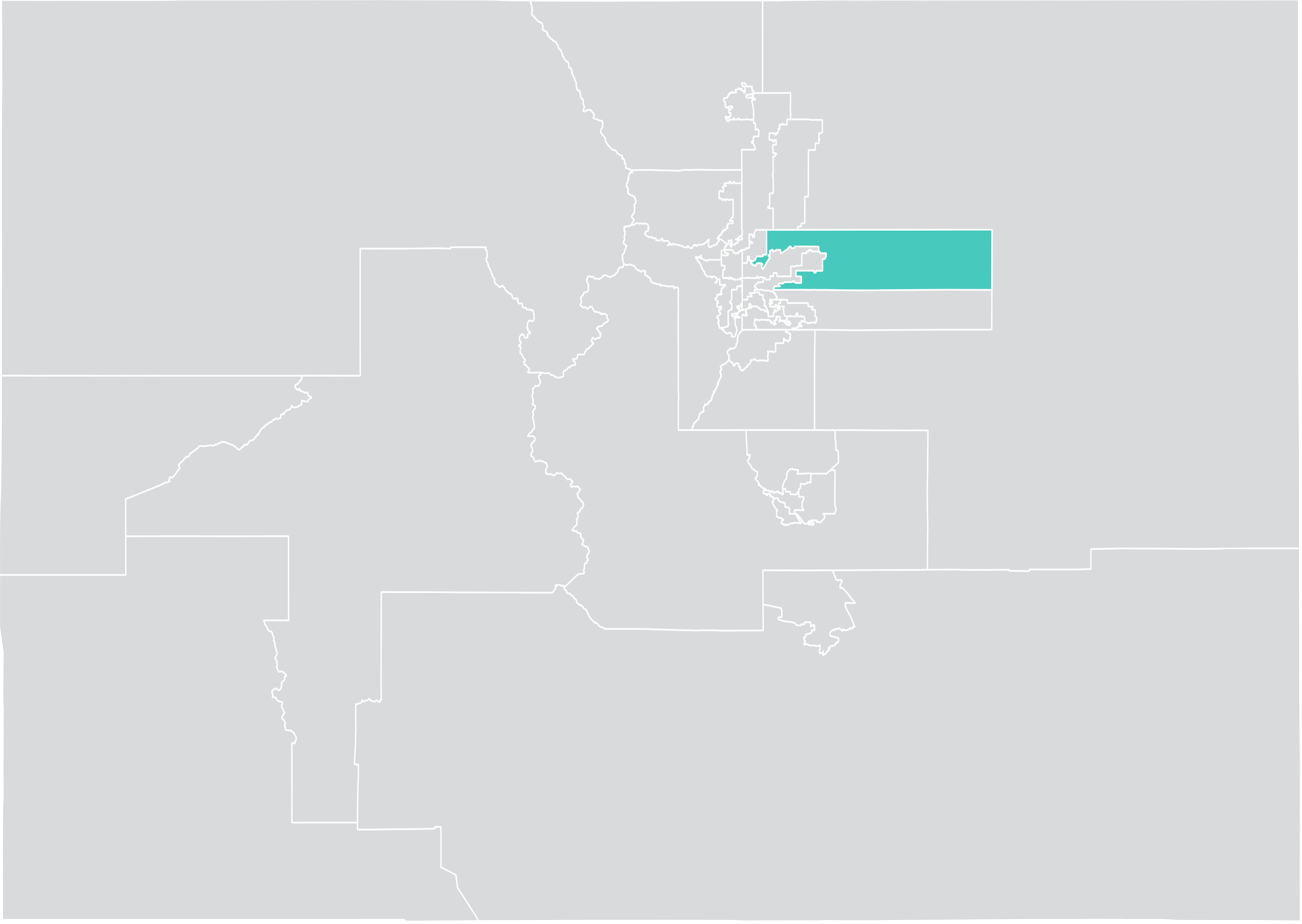
Senator
William Lindstedt; D–Thornton
- Registration: 27.8% Democratic; 18.7% Republican; 51.1% No party preference
- Demographics: 47% White; 5% Black; 40% Hispanic; 4% Asian; 1% Native American; 2% Other
- Population (2018): 168,986
- Registered voters: 96,356

Colorado's 25th Senate district is one of 35 districts in the Colorado Senate. It has most recently been represented by Democrat William Lindstedt since his appointment by Governor Jared Polis on December 30, 2025. Lindstedt filled the vacancy of his predecessor Faith Winter, who died on November 26, 2025. Prior to redistricting the district was represented by Democrats Kevin Priola (who was elected twice as a Republican before switching parties) and Mary Hodge.

== Geography ==
District 25 is based in eastern Adams County in the suburbs of Denver, including parts of Thornton, Brighton, Bennett, Todd Creek, Strasburg, and the northern reaches of Aurora.

The district overlaps with Colorado's 4th, 6th, and 7th congressional districts, and with the 30th, 31st, 34th, and 56th districts of the Colorado House of Representatives.

== Recent election results ==
Colorado state senators are elected to staggered four-year terms. The old 25th district held elections in presidential years, but the new district drawn following the 2020 Census will hold elections in midterm years, starting in 2022.

=== 2022 ===
The 2022 election will be the first one held under the state's new district lines. Incumbent Republican Senator Kevin Priola was redistricted to the 13th district, which was next up in 2024. In 2022, Democratic 24th district Senator Faith Winter ran for the 25th district instead, against Republican Melody Peotter and Libertarian Jeremiah Johnson.

2022 Colorado State Senate election, District 25
Party	Candidate	Votes	%
Democratic	Faith Winter	43,435	61.5
Republican	Melody Peotter	27,207	38.5
Total votes		70,642	100

== Historical election results ==
=== 2020 ===
2020 Colorado State Senate election, District 25
Party	Candidate	Votes	%
Republican	Kevin Priola (incumbent)	37,195	50.8
Democratic	Paula Dickerson	35,968	49.2
Total votes		73,163	100
Republican hold			

=== 2016 ===
2016 Colorado State Senate election, District 25
Party	Candidate	Votes	%
Republican	Kevin Priola	30,074	52.1
Democratic	Jenise May	27,678	47.9
Total votes		57,752	100
Republican gain from Democratic			

=== 2012 ===
2012 Colorado State Senate election, District 25
Party	Candidate	Votes	%
Democratic	Mary Hodge (incumbent)	27,961	55.1
Republican	John Sampson	20,310	40.0
Libertarian	Ronald Schweizer	2,461	4.9
Total votes		50,732	100
Democratic hold			

=== Federal and statewide results ===
Year	Office	Results
2020	President	Biden 52.4 – 44.6%
2018	Governor	Polis 50.4 – 44.8%
2016	President	Clinton 46.7 – 44.9%
2014	Senate	Gardner 48.0 – 44.2%
2014	Governor	Beauprez 47.8 – 46.6%
2012	President	Obama 55.2 – 42.2%
