= Stephanie Takis =

American politician

Member of the Colorado Senate from the 25th district
- In office January 10, 2001 – January 7, 2009
- Preceded by: Bob Martinez
- Succeeded by: Mary Hodge

Member of the Colorado House of Representatives from the 36th district
- In office January 1997 – January 10, 2001
- Preceded by: Don Armstrong
- Succeeded by: Mary Hodge

Personal details
- Died: August 5, 2014 Aurora, Colorado
- Party: Democratic
- Profession: Financial Analyst

Stephanie Takis was a Colorado legislator. She was elected to the Colorado House of Representatives as a Democrat in 1996, and served two terms. She was later elected to the Colorado Senate in 2000 and again in 2004, representing Senate District 25, which covers eastern Adams County including Brighton, Commerce City, Thornton, and portions of Aurora.

== Biography ==
Takis was a financial analyst, and was first elected to the Colorado House of Representatives in 1996, defeating Republican Axel Johnson, then re-elected in 1998, defeating Republican Jack Fish and Reform Party candidate Thomas Janich.

In 2000, Takis was elected to the Colorado State Senate over Republican Bruce Wilcox and Libertarian Ronald Schweizer, and, in 2004, re-elected, defeating Republican Kevin Blount.

In the 2007 session of the Colorado General Assembly, Takis sat on the Senate Appropriations Committee and the Senate Business, Labor & Technology Committee; she also chaired the Legislative Audit Committee and the Senate Transportation Committee.

Takis ran a sanctuary for Mouse-eared bats, which had one of the most successful breeding programs in Colorado.

She died on August 5, 2014.
