= JoAnn Windholz =

American politician (born 1947)

Member of the Colorado House of Representatives from the 30th district
- In office January 7, 2015 – January 11, 2017
- Preceded by: Jenise May
- Succeeded by: Dafna Michaelson Jenet

Personal details
- Born: January 22, 1947 (age 79)
- Party: Republican

JoAnn Windholz (born January 22, 1947) was an American politician from the state of Colorado. A Republican, Windholz served one term in the Colorado House of Representatives, representing District 30.

Windholz is from Commerce City, Colorado. She ran for the Colorado House in 2014, and defeated incumbent Jenise May in the general election by 106 votes.

Following the Colorado Springs Planned Parenthood shooting, Windholz suggested that Planned Parenthood was the "true instigator" of the attack, stating: "Violence is never the answer, but we must start pointing out who is the real culprit. The true instigator of this violence and all violence at any Planned Parenthood facility is Planned Parenthood themselves. Violence begets violence. So Planned Parenthood: YOU STOP THE VIOLENCE INSIDE YOUR WALLS."

In the 2016 general election, Windholz lost to Democratic challenger Dafna Michaelson Jenet. Windholz received 45.81% of the vote to Michaelson Jenet's 54.19%.
