= Bob Marshall (Colorado politician) =

Colorado politician

Member of the Colorado House of Representatives from the 43rd district
- Incumbent
- Assumed office January 9, 2023
- Preceded by: Kurt Huffman

Personal details
- Party: Democratic
- Education: Georgetown University (BA); Cornell Law School (JD/LLM); University of San Diego School of Law (LLM)
- Occupation: Lawyer, military officer, politician

Military service
- Allegiance: United States
- Branch/service: United States Marine Corps
- Years of service: 1991–2017
- Rank: LtCol

Robert Marshall is an American politician who is a member of the Colorado House of Representatives from the 43rd district, which includes most of Highlands Ranch. He was elected in 2022 and assumed office in January 2023.

== Background ==
Marshall was born and raised in Evergreen, Colorado. Marshall attended Georgetown University and joined the Marines after graduating. He attended Cornell Law School and worked as a senior defense counsel and then station judge advocate at a Marine Corps Air Station in Japan. He then worked as a clerk for Judge Siler on the US Court of Appeals and served in Iraq and Afghanistan. Afterwards, Marshall earned an LLM in Tax Law from the University of San Diego School of Law and worked at the IRS.

Marshall was a Republican for over 30 years, but became a Never Trumper in 2017 over the party's embrace of Donald Trump and Trump's negative statements made towards the family of Humayun Khan. The GOP's embrace of US Senate candidate from Alabama and alleged sexual predator Roy Moore caused Marshall to defect from the party, though Marshall stayed politically unaffiliated until he joined the Democratic Party in 2021.

== Political career ==
Before his candidacy, Marshall was active in local county politics. He successfully sued the Douglas County School Board in early 2022 for violating Colorado's open-meetings law when they terminated the superintendent.

Marshall ran unopposed in the Democratic primary election in early 2022 and was set to face Republican Kurt Huffman in the general election. The district was considered Republican-leaning but politically competitive. During his campaign Marshall focused on issues like public safety, public education, and the environment. Marshall also emphasized his military background and patriotism during the campaign. In an effort to reach voters, Marshall drove a World War II era Jeep plastered with campaign materials around the district and aired a commercial on Fox News positioning himself as a "Truman Democrat" who dislikes "communists" and "fascists" and who ran to advance "public safety, public education and the environment."

In the 2022 Colorado House of Representatives elections, Marshall defeated incumbent state Representative Kurt Huffman by over 400 votes, flipping the district and making him the first Democrat to represent the district and first Democrat elected from Douglas County since 1966. Marshall was re-elected in 2024.

=== Tenure ===
During the 2023-24 legislative sessions, Marshall sits on the Finance and Judiciary committees. He has previously outlined bills intended to be introduced during the session including topics like increasing teacher pay, veteran issues, countering crime and other issues surrounding local communities or legislation. Marshall also continued his efforts at transparency and good governance when he successfully sued the entire state house for longstanding illegal practices that violated Colorado's sunshine laws, an effort that led a former GOP Senate Majority Leader to comment that: "It took courage . . . to blow the whistle on this practice.”

== Personal life ==
Marshall worked as an attorney before running for office. He is married and has one daughter. He is a Marine veteran of 28 years.
