= Kurt Huffman =

American politician

Member of the Colorado House of Representatives from the 43rd district
- In office June 17, 2022 – January 9, 2023
- Preceded by: Kevin Van Winkle
- Succeeded by: Bob Marshall

Personal details
- Party: Republican
- Spouse: Julie
- Education: Michigan Technological University (BS); University of Michigan (MS); University of Colorado; Boulder (MS); University of Colorado; Denver (MBA)

Kurt Huffman is an American businessman, engineer, and politician who briefly served as a member of the Colorado House of Representatives for the 43rd district. He was appointed on June 17, 2022, succeeding Kevin Van Winkle. Following his defeat in the 2022 general election, his term ended on January 9, 2023.

== Education ==
Huffman earned a Bachelor of Science in mechanical engineering from Michigan Technological University, a Master of Science in mechanical engineering from the University of Michigan, a Master of Science in engineering management from the University of Colorado Boulder, and a Master of Business Administration from the University of Colorado Denver.

== Career ==
Huffman worked as an engineer at Lockheed Martin. He was also a member of the Douglas County Planning Commission. Huffman served as a legislative volunteer in the Colorado General Assembly for four sessions. After Kevin Van Winkle was appointed to a seat in the Colorado Senate and left his House seat vacant, Huffman was selected to replace him. He later won the Republican primary for a full term in the House.

In the 2022 Colorado House elections, Huffman lost to Democrat Bob Marshall.
