= Scott Renfroe =

American politician

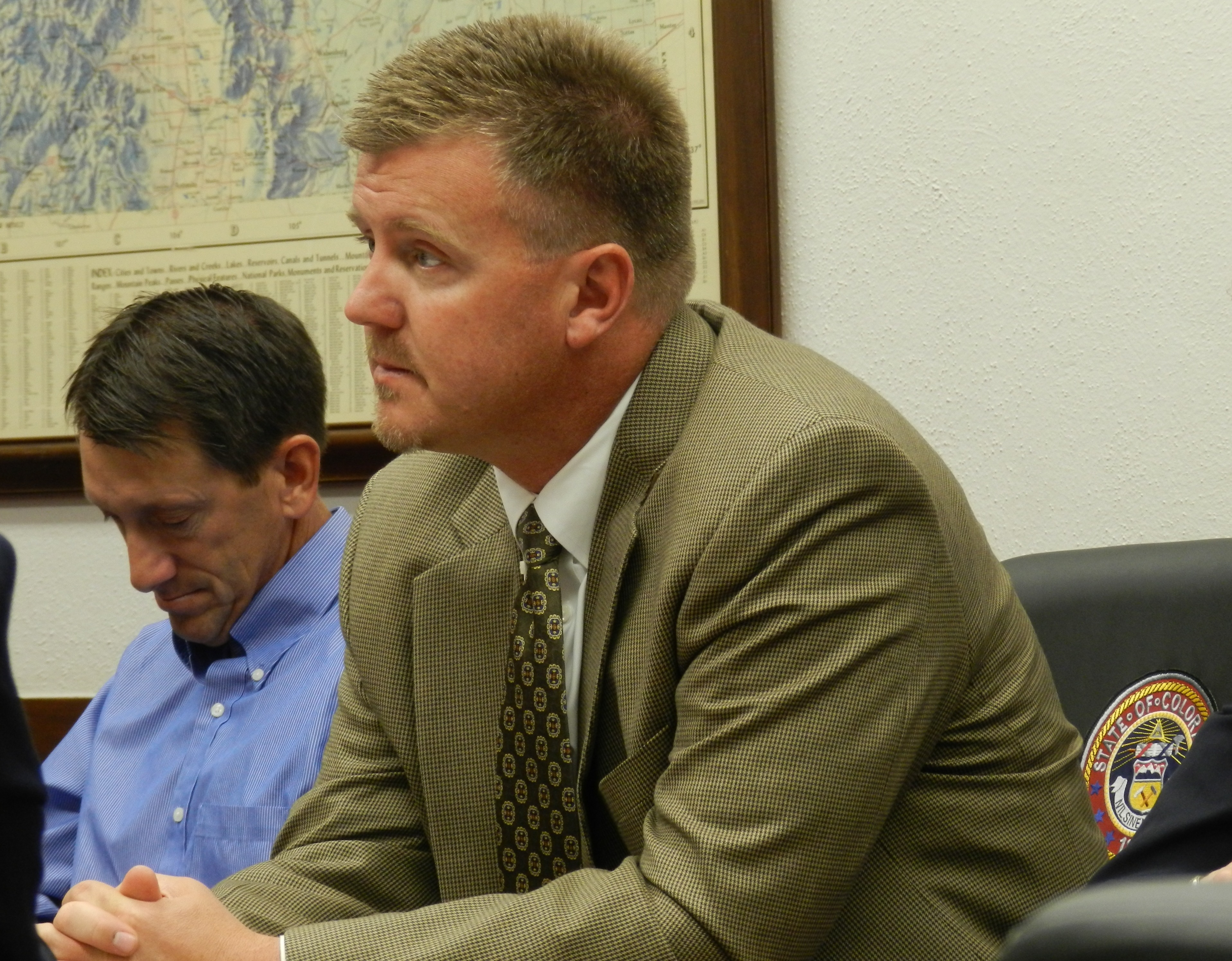
- Renfroe in 2010.

Member of the Colorado Senate from the 13th district
- In office January 10, 2007 – January 7, 2015
- Preceded by: Dave Owen
- Succeeded by: John Cooke

Personal details
- Born: December 7, 1966 (age 59) Greeley, Colorado, U.S.
- Party: Republican
- Spouse: Pamela Renfroe
- Education: Iowa State University; Colorado State University, Fort; Collins

Scott Renfroe (born December 7, 1966) is a former legislator in the U.S. state of Colorado. Elected to the Colorado State Senate as a Republican in 2006, Renfroe represented Senate District 13, which encompasses northern and eastern Weld County, including the city of Greeley.

== Biography ==
Born in Greeley, Colorado, Renfroe graduated from Eaton High School in 1985, where he played basketball and was quarterback of the high school football team. He started his college career on a baseball scholarship at Iowa State University, but ended up attending four different colleges within a span of four years, ultimately graduating from Colorado State University in 1989 with a degree in business administration.

Renfroe is married; he and his wife, Pamela, met in high school and have five children: Olivia, Sylvia, Vivian, and twin sons Derek and Spencer. He was elected twice to the Eaton School District Board of Education, in 1997 and 2001. While on the Board of Education, he worked to adopt an abstinence-only sex education curriculum.

After college, Renfroe returned to Greeley, Colorado to work for his father's company, Foundation Builders, Inc.; he eventually became Vice President and part-owner of the Weld County concrete contractor. Renfroe has served as president of the Weld County Builders Association and lent his experience to the Weld County Building Trades Advisory Board and the Greeley Building Inspection Advisory Board. As a developer, Renfroe's company helped bring the first strip mall and commercial center to the small town of Eaton.

He has sat on the Board of Deacons and Board of Trustees of Evangelical Free Church of Eaton, and has gone on short-term missions trips to India and Belize.

His father is Jack Renfroe, one of the founders and board member of the now defunct New Frontier Bank. Renfroe was also a shareholder in New Frontier Bank.

== Legislative career ==
=== 2006 election ===
Renfroe faced Rep. Dale Hall for the Republican nomination in the right-leaning district; both sought to replace retiring Sen. Dave Owen. Renfroe targeted Hall for, as a member of the legislature's Joint Budget Committee, being a vocal proponent of Colorado's Referendum C in 2005. The measure allowed the state to retain additional tax revenue, and Renfroe criticized the measure as unnecessary government spending. At the Republican party district assembly in April, Renfroe narrowly edged out Hall in delegate votes, earning the top spot on the primary ballot.

In the Republican primary, Renfroe positioned himself as the more conservative candidate, benefiting from attacks by groups portraying Hall as "liberal" on gun control, immigration and abortion. Hall rebutted a number of factual errors and distortions in the third-party attacks, and the Christian Coalition publicly apologized for errors in their mailing. Renfroe also garnered endorsements from former U.S. Senator William Armstrong, former Colorado Senate President John Andrews, and Congresswoman Marilyn Musgrave; Hall was endorsed by four Weld County commissioners and Gov. Bill Owens. Renfroe won the August primary election with 58 percent of the vote.

In the general election, Renfroe faced Democrat Solomon Little Owl, director of Native American Student Services at the University of Northern Colorado. In the predominantly Republican district, Renfroe also criticized Little Owl for his support of Referendum C and his activism against a local American Indian school mascot. Renfroe ultimately won the contest with 60 percent of the general election vote.

=== 2007 legislative session ===
In the 2007 session of the General Assembly, Renfroe served on the Senate Health and Human Services Committee, the Senate Judiciary Committee, and the Senate Transportation Committee.

During the 2007 legislative session, Renfroe fulfilled a campaign promise to sponsor legislation banning almost all abortions and redefining pregnancy in state law to begin at conception. After intense lobbying by both pro-life and pro-choice groups, the measure was defeated along party lines in the Senate Judiciary Committee.

He also introduced legislation to reduce paperwork for small businesses, to allow school districts to represent themselves at truancy hearings, and to eliminate a state database of concealed weapons permit holders.

Renfroe was among Republican legislators who opposed revising statewide sex education standards to include information about birth control and sexually transmitted diseases; he unsuccessfully attempted to amend the legislation to exempt school districts within Weld County. Renfroe also opposed measures to allow members of homosexual couples to adopt each other's children, and to name John Denver's "Rocky Mountain High" one of Colorado's state songs.

During the 2007 session, Renfroe, along with a dozen other Republican legislators, joined the State Legislators for Legal Immigration coalition, advocating for heightened border security and cutting government benefits to illegal aliens.

Following the legislative session, Renfroe served on the legislature's interim committee on Long-Term Care Health Care Services and Support to Persons with Developmental Disabilities, the Legislative Oversight Committee for the Continuing Examination of the Treatment of Persons with Mental Illness who are Involved in the Justice System., and the Transportation Legislation Review Committee.

=== 2008 legislative session ===
In the 2008 session of the General Assembly, Renfroe served on the Senate Judiciary Committee and the Senate Transportation Committee.

For the 2008 Colorado General Assembly, Renfroe announced plans to sponsor legislation to prioritize funding to assist those with developmental disabilities, to allow the Colorado Historical Society to use more energy efficient materials, and to establish uniform rules for drivers cited for DUI, equalizing sentencing rules for those given a summons and those arrested for drunk driving. Renfroe also sponsored a bill that was killed in committee that would have allowed citizens to sue the government over violations of the right to free exercise of religion.

In April, Renfroe was one of only two senators to vote against the nomination of Celeste C de Baca to the state parole board, citing concerns about her conduct as a judge. Renfroe is also exploring legislation regarding water rights along the South Platte River.

=== 2009 legislative session ===
For the 2009 session of the Colorado General Assembly, Renfroe sat on the Senate Transportation Committee and the Senate Judiciary Committee, of which he is the ranking Republican member.

Renfroe sponsored legislation to allow small unlicensed day-care facilities to care for children from multiple families as well as a measure to add a penalty to the state statute prohibiting government employees from working as lobbyists within six months of leaving their jobs. He also introduced legislation to delay the imposition of new environmental rules on oil and gas drilling in Colorado.

=== 2010 legislative session ===
In 2010, Senator Renfroe and several fellow Republicans introduced a bill, SB10-096, calling for transparency of costs on utility bills. This bill would have required utility companies to list expenses on a customer’s bill, i.e. costs associated with providing the service, costs of gas storage, etc. SB10-096 was assigned to the Senate Committee on Local Government and Energy, where it later failed to pass and was postponed indefinitely.

=== 2010 election ===
Renfroe faced Democratic challenger Ken Storck in the 2010 election., and he defeated Storck with 65% of the vote.

=== 2011 legislative session ===
In 2011, Renfroe was elected to serve as the Republican Caucus Whip. He was also appointed to the Legislative Audit Committee, Capitol Development Committee, and acts as the ranking Republican member of the Senate Transportation and Education Committees.

Senator Renfroe was honored with the title of Taxpayer Champion after the 2011 legislative session for his consistent voting down of tax increases on the public. Based on his 90% scoring by the Colorado Union of Taxpayers, Renfroe tied with Senator Kevin Lundberg for the award.

Also during the year, Renfroe was given the title of Statesman of the Year by the Christian Home Educators of Colorado, which honors one local representative or senator each legislative session.

=== 2012 legislative session ===
During the 2012 legislative session, Renfroe’s main focus was SB12-050. This legislation sought to ban red light cameras and photo radar at intersections. The measure has been adopted in 15 other states across the nation as well; however, Renfroe’s bill failed in the Senate Transportation Committee.

Renfroe was elected as the Republican Caucus Chairman, while also maintaining membership of the Legislative Audit Committee, Capitol Development Committee, and acting as the ranking Republican member of the Senate Transportation and Education Committees.

=== 2013 Legislative Session ===
Renfroe was appointed to serve on the Senate Education Committee, Appropriations Committee, and Legislative Council.

== Controversy ==
On March 11, 2011, when debating a bill requiring a minimal amount of time in physical education classes, he suggested that schools are feminizing boys.

Renfroe was a shareholder in New Frontier Bank, which has since closed. The failure was particularly hard on agricultural producers in the region.

On the 40th Anniversary of the 1970 Kent State shootings, Renfroe suggested that the Colorado National Guard should be called out on pro marijuana activists who were demonstrating near the Colorado capitol while the Colorado legislature debated medical marijuana legislation.
