= Kevin Leung (politician) =

American politician

Member-elect of the Colorado Senate from the 30th district
- Assuming office January 2027
- Succeeding: John Carson

Personal details
- Party: Democratic
- Education: University of Utah; University of Colorado, Boulder; University of Colorado, Denver
- Website: Campaign website

Kevin Leung is an American politician. A member of the Democratic Party, he is the member-elect for the 30th district of the Colorado State Senate. He was elected at the 2026 election. He is a small business owner, school board director and fire rescue board member.
