= John Carson (Colorado politician) =

American politician

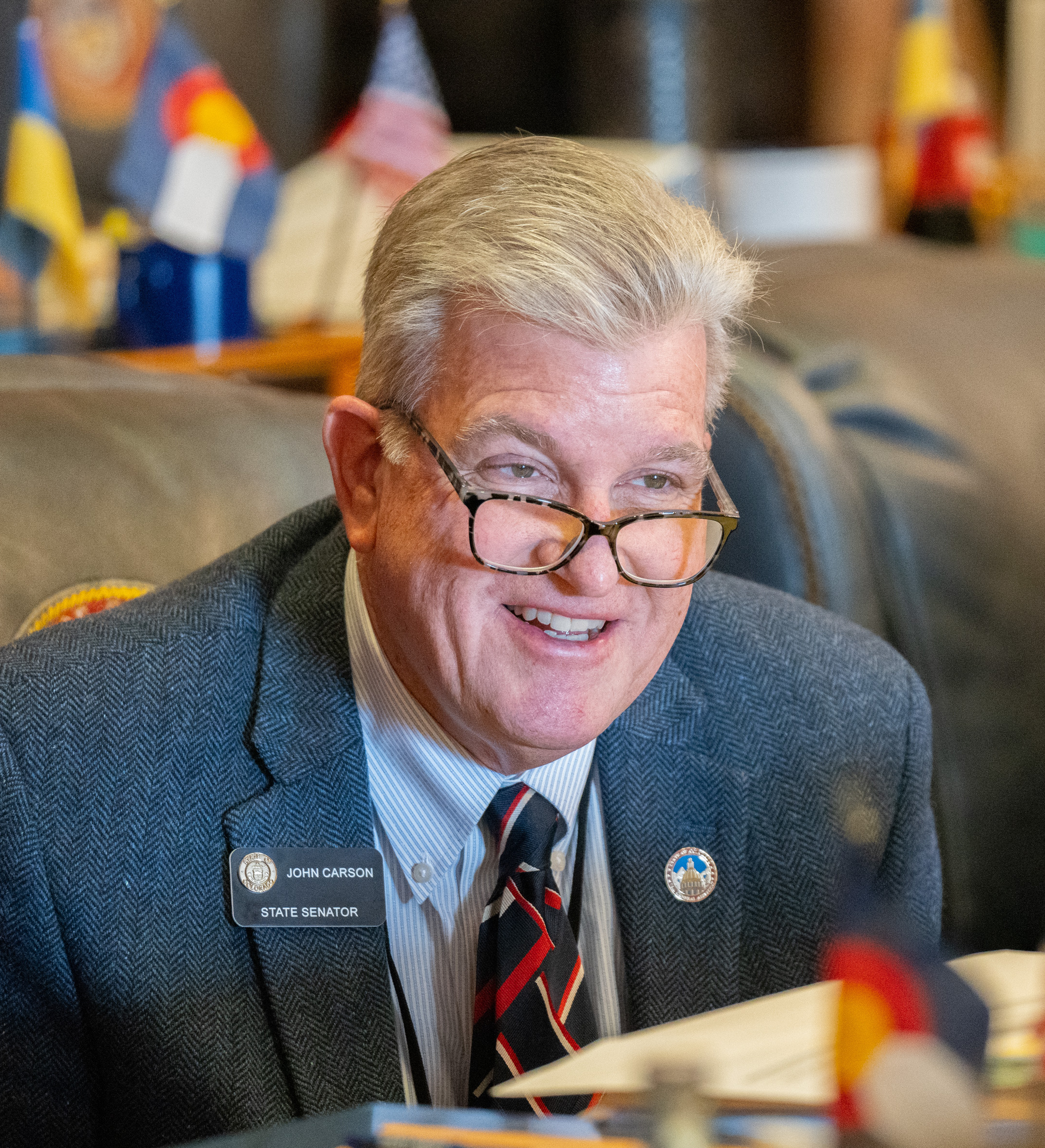

Member of the Colorado Senate from the 30th district
- Incumbent
- Assumed office January 8, 2025
- Preceded by: Kevin Van Winkle
- Succeeded by: Kevin Leung (elect)

Personal details
- Party: Republican

John Carson is a state senator from Highlands Ranch, Colorado, U.S. Carson, a Republican, represents Colorado's 30th Senate district, which includes much of northern Douglas County, including the communities of Highlands Ranch, Lone Tree, Castle Pines, Roxborough Park, and Meridian.

== Background ==
Originally from Colorado, Carson earned an undergraduate degree from the University of Colorado Boulder and a Juris Doctor from the University of Colorado Law School. Later he earned a Master of Laws in Taxation degree from the Georgetown University Law Center. After graduating from Georgetown, over a period of eleven years, he worked for two senators and a congressman in Washington, D.C., including former Colorado senator Wayne Allard. Following his work in Washington, he returned to Colorado to serve as the Rocky Mountain Regional Director of the U.S. Department of Housing and Urban Development. Later, he worked as a corporate attorney in Greenwood Village, Colorado.

From 1979 to 1985, Carson served in the United States Marine Corps Reserve.

Carson served as the Regional Director of Department of Housing and Urban Development from 2000-2009.

Carson served on the board of the Douglas County Board of Education from 2005, and was its president from 2009 to 2013.

== Electoral history ==
Carson has held public office three times. Most recently, a vacancy committee appointed him to represent Colorado's 30th Senate District on January 4, 2025, following the resignation of former senator Kevin Van Winkle. His term began on January 8, 2025, and will end in January 2027, unless he is re-elected.

In 2014, Carson was elected to serve on the Board of Regents of the University of Colorado. Sworn in in January 2015, he served a single six-year term, representing the 6th district. He left the board in 2021, his term completed.

In 2005, Carson was elected to serve on the Douglas County (Colorado) School Board. He served two four-year terms, and during his second term (2009–2013), he served as the board's president.

== Controversies ==
On April 2, 2026, a bill sponsored by Carson to exempt "critical infrastructure" from Colorado's original Right to Repair bill was under discussion by the Senate Business, Labor, & Technology Committee. During this committee, Carson stated that Governor Polis issued a signing statement that requested the original bill be fixed with an exemption for critical infrastructure. It was revealed that there was no such directive made by the governor.
