= Jenise May =

American politician

Member of the Colorado House of Representatives from the 30th district
- In office January 9, 2013 – January 2015
- Preceded by: Kevin Priola
- Succeeded by: JoAnn Windholz

Personal details
- Party: Democratic
- Website: jenisemay.com

Jenise May is an American politician and a Democratic member of the Colorado House of Representatives representing District 30 from 2013 to 2015.

== Political career ==
With incumbent Republican Representative Kevin Priola redistricted to District 56, May was unopposed for the District 30 June 26, 2012 Democratic Primary, winning with 1,780 votes; and won the three-way November 6, 2012 General election with 14,130 votes (55.2%) against Republican nominee Mike Sheely (who had run for the House in 1994) and Libertarian candidate Shea Lantz.

May was defeated in the 2014 election by Republican JoAnn Windholz, losing by 106 votes.
