= Colorado's 30th Senate district =

American legislative district

Colorado's 30th State Senate district
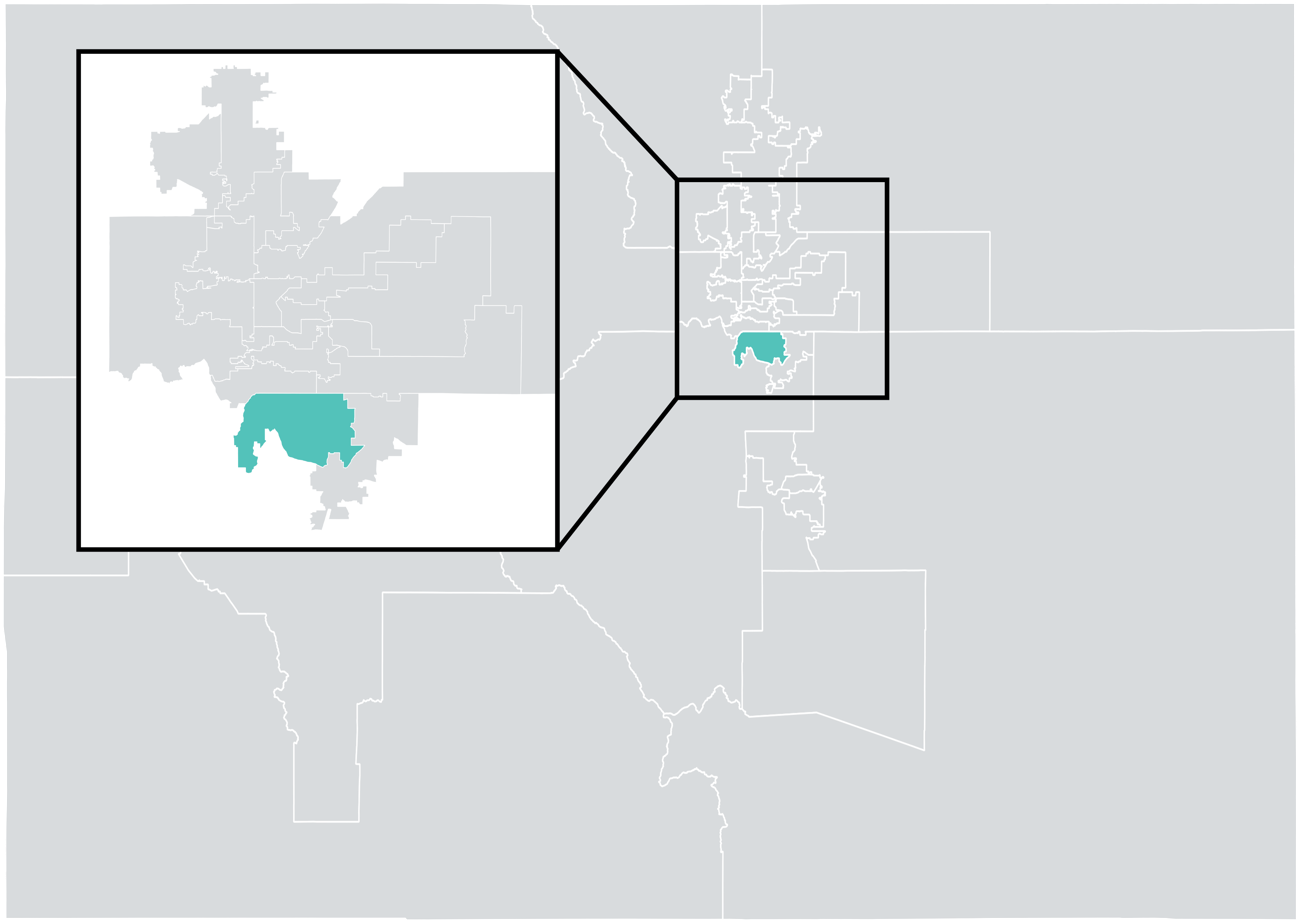
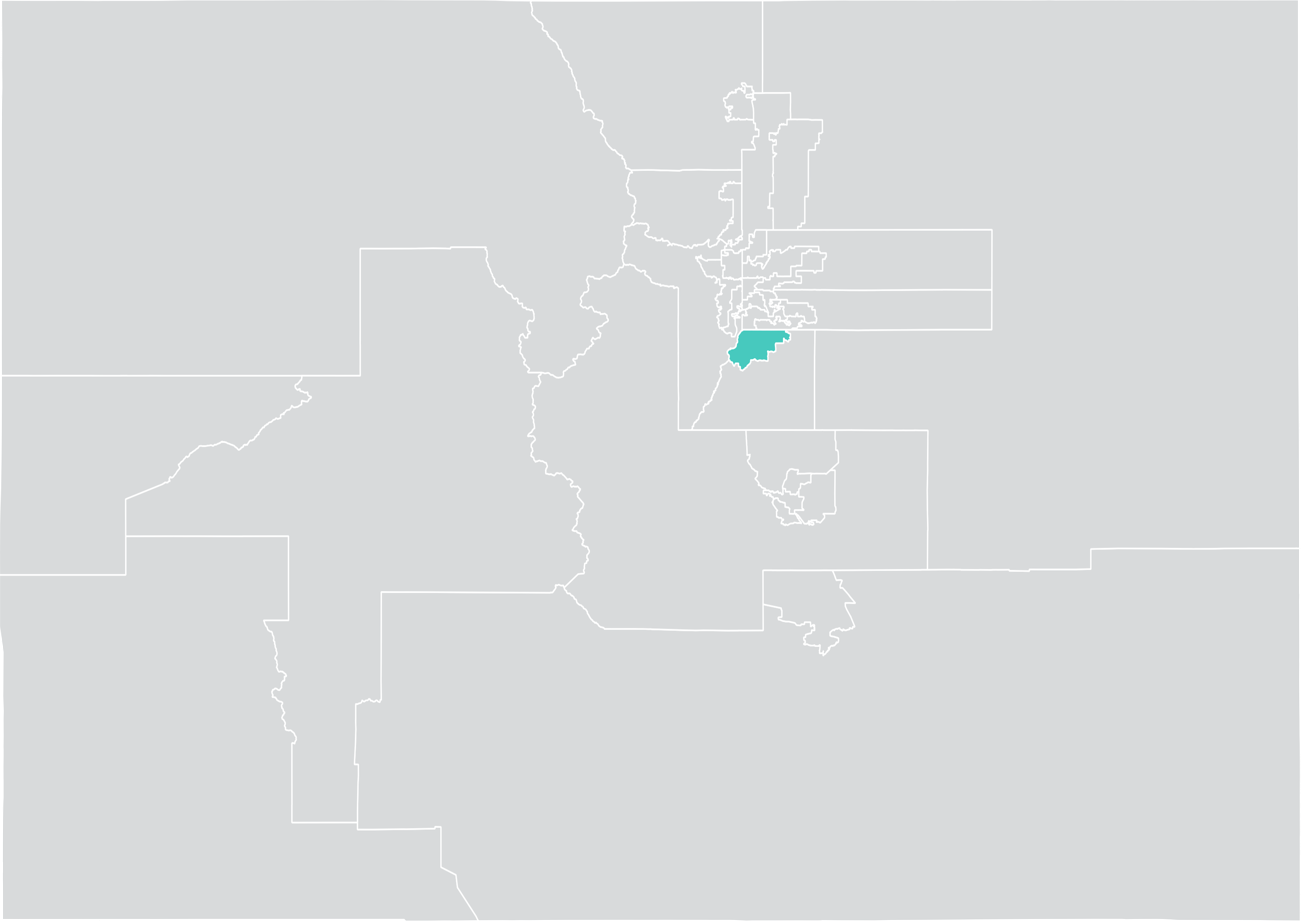
Senator
| John Carson; R–Highlands Ranch |
- Registration: 29.4% Republican; 19.0% Democratic; 49.9% No party preference
- Demographics: 79% White; 2% Black; 8% Hispanic; 9% Asian; 2% Native American; 2% Other
- Population (2020): 168,526
- Registered voters: 131,252

Colorado's 30th Senate district is one of 35 districts in the Colorado Senate. It has been represented by Republican John Carson since December 2024, following the resignation of fellow Republican Kevin Van Winkle.

== List of state senators ==
- Kevin Van Winkle
- John Carson
- Kevin Leung

== Geography ==
District 30 covers the far southern suburbs of Denver in Douglas County, including Highlands Ranch, Lone Tree, Meridian, Stonegate, Acres Green, Roxborough Park, and small parts of Parker and Littleton.

The district overlaps with Colorado's 4th and 6th congressional districts, and with the 39th, 43rd, 44th, and 45th districts of the Colorado House of Representatives.

== Recent election results ==
Colorado state senators are elected to staggered four-year terms; under normal circumstances, the 30th district holds elections in midterm years. The 2022 election will be the first held under the state's new district lines.

=== 2022 ===
In May 2022, incumbent Senator Chris Holbert resigned, saying that he intended to move to Florida. State Rep. Kevin Van Winkle was chosen to take Holbert's place, and is seeking a full term in 2022.

2022 Colorado State Senate election, District 30
| Party | Candidate | Votes | % |
|---|---|---|---|
| Republican | Kevin Van Winkle (incumbent) | 46,751 | 53.8 |
| Democratic | Braeden Miguel | 40,122 | 46.2 |
| Total votes | | 86,873 | 100 |

== Historical election results ==
=== 2018 ===
2018 Colorado State Senate election, District 30
| Party | Candidate | Votes | % |
|---|---|---|---|
| Republican | Chris Holbert (incumbent) | 43,948 | 52.8 |
| Democratic | Julia Varnell-Sarjeant | 34,604 | 41.6 |
| Independent | Steve Peterson | 4,710 | 5.7 |
| Total votes | | 83,262 | 100 |
| Republican hold | | | |

=== 2014 ===
2014 Colorado State Senate election, District 30
| Party | Candidate | Votes | % |
|---|---|---|---|
| Republican | Chris Holbert | 39,897 | 62.5 |
| Democratic | Bette Davis | 21,566 | 33.8 |
| Libertarian | Eric Price | 2,359 | 3.7 |
| Total votes | | 63,822 | 100 |
| Republican hold | | | |

=== Federal and statewide results ===
| Year | Office | Results |
|---|---|---|
| 2022 | Governor | Polis 54.3 – 45.7% |
| 2022 | Senate | Bennet 50.1 – 49.9% |
| 2020 | President | Biden 49.6 – 48.1% |
| 2020 | Senate | Gardner 52.4 – 44.6% |
| 2018 | Governor | Stapleton 52.8 – 44.3% |
| 2016 | President | Trump 50.9 – 40.8% |
| 2012 | President | Romney 60.9 – 39.2% |
