= Kevin Van Winkle =

American politician (born 1981)

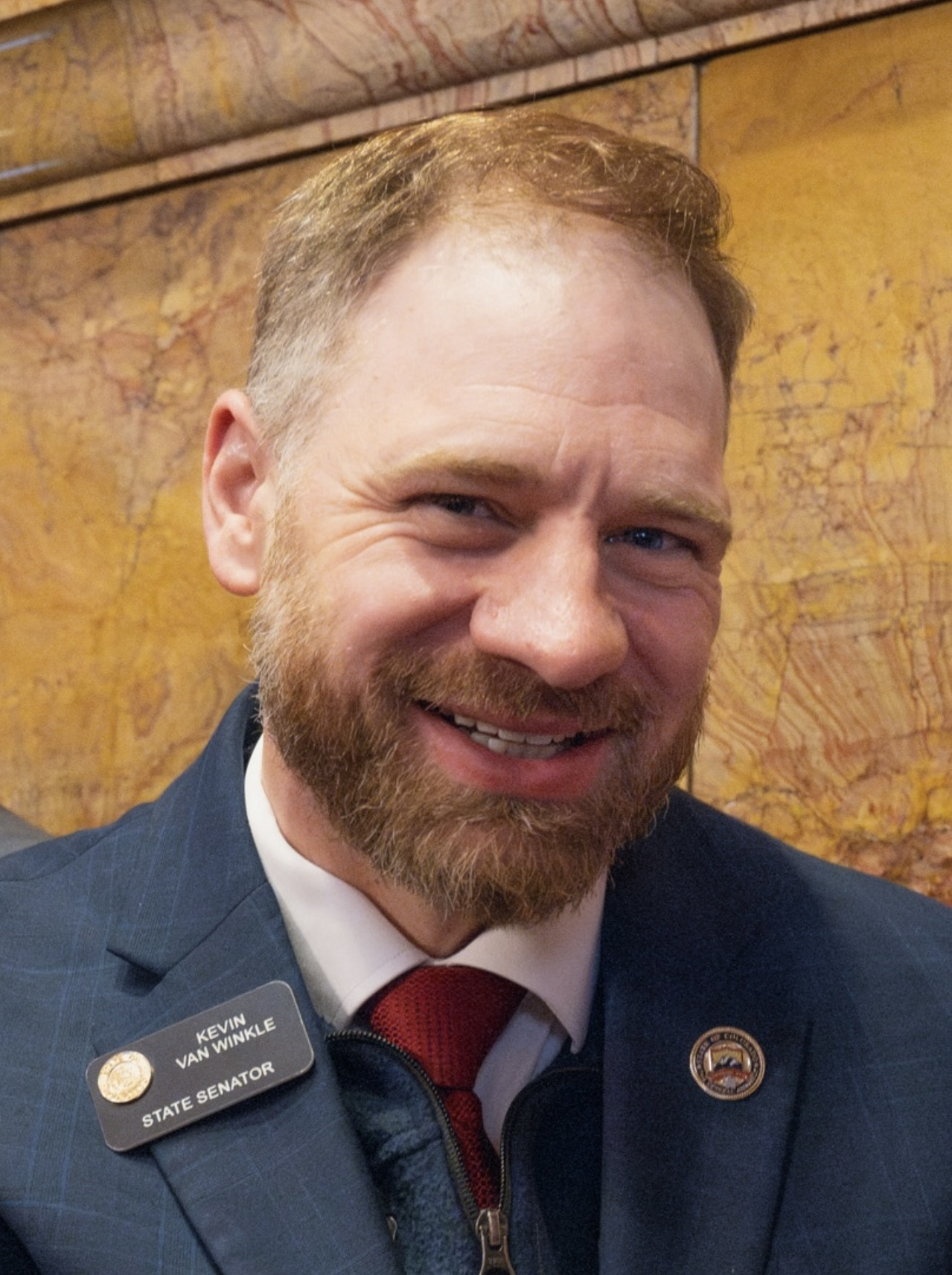

Board of County Commissioners of Douglas County from the 3rd district
- Incumbent
- Assumed office December 17, 2024
- Preceded by: Lora L. Thomas

Member of the Colorado Senate from the 30th district
- In office June 13, 2022 – December 17, 2024
- Preceded by: Chris Holbert
- Succeeded by: John Carson

Member of the Colorado House of Representatives from the 43rd district
- In office January 7, 2015 – June 13, 2022
- Preceded by: Frank McNulty
- Succeeded by: Kurt Huffman

Personal details
- Born: 1981 (age 44–45)
- Party: Republican
- Spouse: Kelly
- Education: Metropolitan State University of Denver
- Profession: Small business owner
- Website: vanwinkleforcolorado.com/home/

Kevin Van Winkle (born 1981) is a Colorado politician serving as a Douglas County Commissioner. He is a former Republican member of the Colorado Senate, representing the 30th district in Douglas County. Previously, he served in the Colorado House of Representatives from the 43rd District, which encompassed Highlands Ranch, Colorado.

== Education ==
He earned a bachelor's degree from Metropolitan State University of Denver.

== Political career ==
Van Winkle was first elected to the State House in 2014, winning 63.3% of the vote against his Democratic challenger in the general election. Running for re-election in 2016, he again beat his Democratic opponent, winning 60.34% of the vote.

In December 2020, Van Winkle promoted allegations of fraud in the 2020 presidential election, pushing conspiracies about Dominion Voting Systems and endorsing a petition that falsely claimed that there was fraud in the election.

In the aftermath of the 2020 presidential election, on December 7, 2020, Van Winkle and 7 other Republicans demanded to the Speaker of the House KC Becker that a committee be formed on "election integrity" to conduct an audit of the Dominion Voting Systems used in Colorado's 2020 elections in spite of no evidence of issues. The request was rejected, with Becker criticizing it as a promotion of "debunked conspiracy theories."

Following the resignation of state senator Chris Holbert, a Republican vacancy committee appointed Van Winkle to represent District 30 in the State Senate. He was sworn in on June 13, 2022.

In the 2022 elections, Van Winkle was a candidate to represent the newly reapportioned District 30 in the Colorado Senate. The district includes a part of northern Douglas County. Van Winkle's candidacy was successful. In the general election for Senate district 30 held on November 8, 2022, he defeated his Democratic Party opponent, winning 53.82% of the total votes cast.

In 2024, Van Winkle ran to represent district 3 of the Douglas County Board of County Commissioners. In the Republican primary election held June 25, 2024, he faced two opponents, John Carson and Priscilla Rahn. Van Winkle won the primary, getting 40.58% of the votes cast. In the general election held November 5, 2024, Van Winkle defeated Democratic candidate Josh Smith. Following his election to the Douglas County Commission, Van Winkle announced that he would resign from the State Senate, two years into his four-year term. He was subsequently appointed to the vacant seat on December 17, 2024. On January 4, 2025, it was announced that John Carson would fill the vacancy in the Senate.
