= Wes McKinley =

American politician

Member of the Colorado House of Representatives from the 64th district
- In office January 12, 2005 – January 9, 2013
- Preceded by: Brad Jay Young
- Succeeded by: Tim Dore

Personal details
- Born: March 5, 1945 (age 81)
- Party: Democratic

Wes McKinley (born March 5, 1945) is an American politician who served in the Colorado House of Representatives from the 64th district from 2005 to 2013.
