= John Cooke (Colorado politician) =

American politician

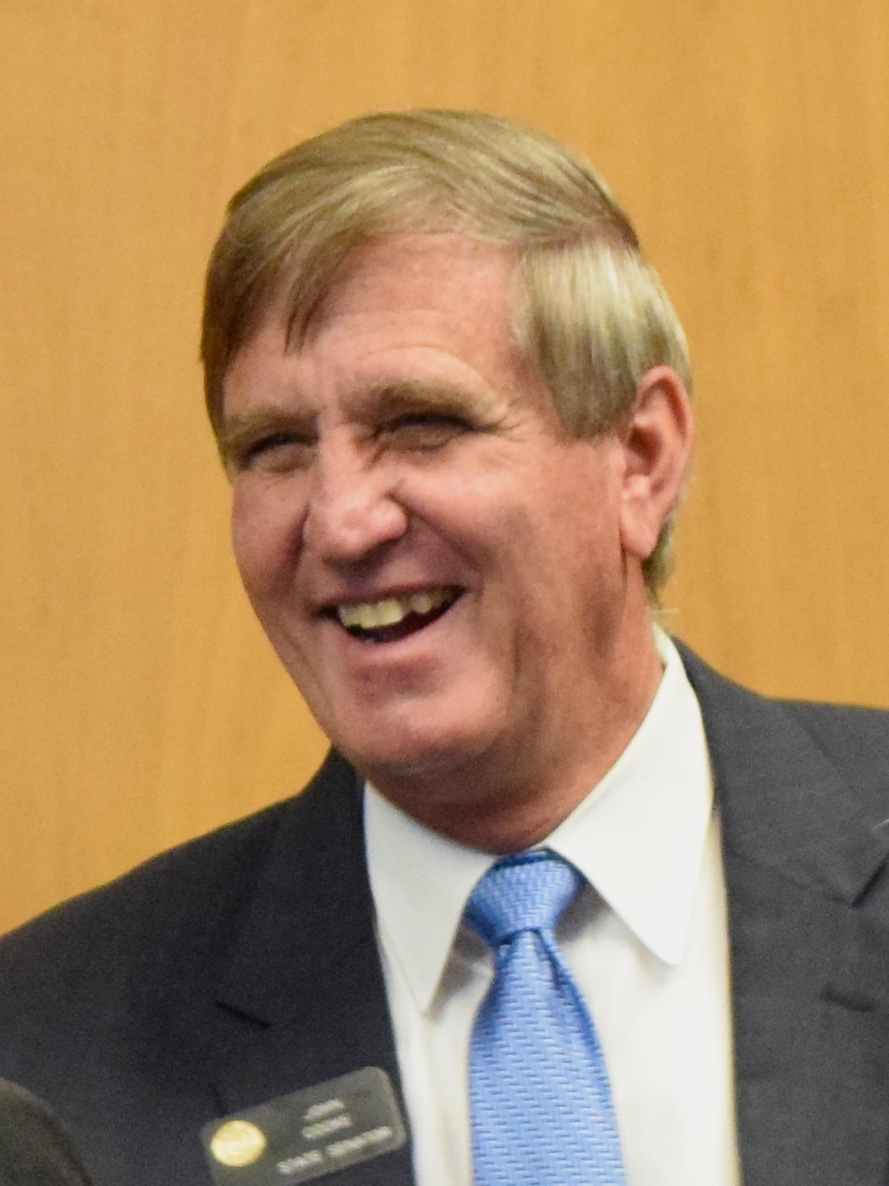
- Cooke in 2016

Minority Leader of the Colorado Senate
- In office May 16, 2022 – January 9, 2023
- Preceded by: Chris Holbert
- Succeeded by: Paul Lundeen

Member of the Colorado Senate from the 13th district
- In office January 7, 2015 – January 9, 2023
- Preceded by: Scott Renfroe
- Succeeded by: Redistricted

Personal details
- Born: San Juan, Puerto Rico, U.S.
- Party: Republican
- Education: University of Northern Colorado (BA)

Military service
- Allegiance: United States
- Branch/service: United States Army
- Unit: Army National Guard • 220th Military Police Brigade

John B. Cooke III is an American politician who served in the Colorado Senate from the 13th district as a member of the Republican Party. He also served as the Minority Leader in the state senate from May 2022 to January 2023. Prior to his tenure in the state legislature, he served as sheriff of Weld County, Colorado.

Cooke was born in San Juan, Puerto Rico, and educated at Arvada West High School and the University of Northern Colorado. He served in the Army National Guard with the 220th Military Police Brigade before joining law enforcement. He worked as a police officer in Breckenridge, Colorado before becoming the undersheriff of Weld County, Colorado, and then being elected as sheriff. He was elected to the state senate in the 2014 election and reelected in 2018. During his tenure in the state senate, he has served as the Majority Whip, Assistant Minority Leader, and Minority Leader.

== Early life ==
John B. Cooke III was born in San Juan, Puerto Rico, and his family lived there for five years. He graduated from Arvada West High School and graduated from the University of Northern Colorado with a degree in sociology. He served in the Army National Guard with the 220th Military Police Brigade for six years. He graduated from the FBI National Academy and attended the Law Enforcement Executive Development Seminar. He and his wife had two children.

== Career ==
=== Sheriff ===
Cooke worked for the Breckenridge Police Department after graduating from college. Cooke served as undersheriff of Weld County, Colorado, until his election as sheriff, which he served from 2002 to 2014. During his tenure as sheriff, he placed Weld County's sex offender registry online.

The American Civil Liberties Union sued Weld County after Cooke and District Attorney Ken Buck seized the income tax records of a preparer who served thousands of Latino residents in Greeley. Cooke and Buck stated that the records were taken as they claimed that around 1,300 illegal immigrants filed tax returns using false or stolen identities. Weld County spent over $100,000 on defense during the case. District Judge James Hiatt ruled in favor of the ACLU, stating that the search conducted by Buck and Cooke was illegal as the federal law made the records confidential.

=== Colorado Senate ===
Senator Scott Renfroe ran for the Republican nomination in Colorado's 4th congressional district for the 2014 election. Cooke won the Republican nomination and defeated Democratic nominee Joe Perez in the general election. Cooke won reelection after defeating Democratic nominee Phil Kelley and Libertarian nominee Eric E. Joss in the 2018 election.

Cooke was selected to serve as Majority Whip in 2016 and selected to serve as Assistant Minority Leader in 2018. Minority Leader Chris Holbert resigned from the state senate, and Cooke was selected to replace him beginning on May 16, 2022, while Senator Bob Gardner replaced him as Assistant Minority Leader.

== Political positions ==
=== Crime ===
Cooke supported a resolution by Buck, which asked for support from the Greeley city council for Buck's request for an ICE office in Greeley. Cooke stated that "if the federal government wants to establish an ICE office here, they'll establish an ICE office here". When Governor Bill Ritter planned to release 3,500 prisoners early to save $45 million, as a part of a plan to reduce the state budget by $320 million, Cooke proposed cutting social programs instead.

Cooke opposed gun control legislation proposed by President Barack Obama. He also refused to enforce gun control legislation passed in Colorado. Cooke proposed legislation in the state senate that would repeal Colorado's fifteen-round limit on ammunition magazines.

== Electoral history ==
John Cooke electoral history

2002 Weld County, Colorado sheriff election
Primary election
Party	Candidate	Votes	%
Republican	John Cooke	9,313	100.00%
Total votes		9,313	100.00%
General election
Republican	John Cooke	41,323	100.00%
Total votes		41,323	100.00%

2006 Weld County, Colorado sheriff election
Primary election
Party	Candidate	Votes	%
Republican	John Cooke (incumbent)	9,139	100.00%
Total votes		9,139	100.00%
General election
Republican	John Cooke (incumbent)	53,625	100.00%
Total votes		53,625	100.00%

2010 Weld County, Colorado sheriff election
Primary election
Party	Candidate	Votes	%
Republican	John Cooke (incumbent)	15,755	100.00%
Total votes		16,755	100.00%
General election
Republican	John Cooke (incumbent)	53,785	70.54%
Democratic	Joseph R. Padilla	22,462	29.46%
Total votes		76,247	100.00%

2014 Colorado Senate 13th district election
Primary election
Party	Candidate	Votes	%
Republican	John Cooke	9,713	100.00%
Total votes		9,713	100.00%
General election
Republican	John Cooke	26,063	63.66%
Democratic	Joe Perez	14,879	36.34%
Total votes		40,942	100.00%

2018 Colorado Senate 13th district election
Primary election
Party	Candidate	Votes	%
Republican	John Cooke (incumbent)	10,763	100.00%
Total votes		10,763	100.00%
General election
Republican	John Cooke (incumbent)	33,026	58.71%
Democratic	Phil Kelley	21,453	38.14%
Libertarian	Eric E. Joss	1,776	3.16%
Total votes		56,255	100.00%

Colorado Senate
Preceded by Chris Holbert	Minority Leader of the Colorado Senate; 2022–2023	Succeeded by Paul Lundeen
