= Scott Bright =

American politician

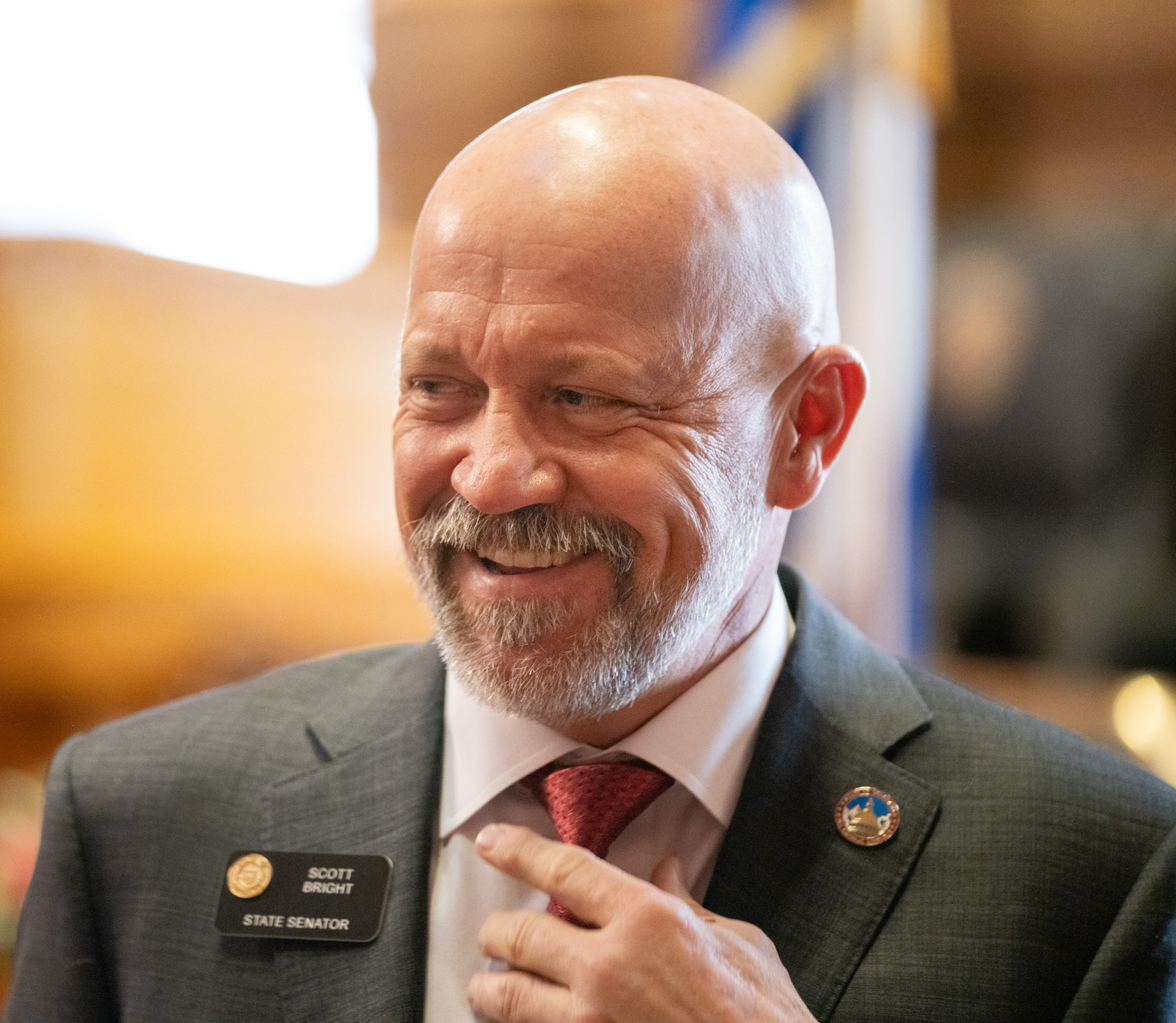

Member of the Colorado Senate from the 13th district
- Incumbent
- Assumed office January 8, 2025
- Preceded by: Kevin Priola

Personal details
- Party: Republican
- Website: scottbrightcoloradosenate.com

Scott Bright is a state senator from Platteville, Colorado, U.S. A Republican, Bright represents Colorado's 13th Senate district, which includes parts of Weld and Adams counties in northcentral Colorado, including all or parts of the communities of Greeley, Brighton, Evans, Fort Lupton, and Platteville.

== Background ==
Bright is an expert in early childhood education. Also a businessman, he owns a firm called ABC Child Development Centers. It is based in Weld County and runs 25 early childhood education centers there. The business employs 250 workers and serves more than 2,000 families.

Bright chairs the Colorado Department of Early Childhood's Rules Advisory Committee. Bright is the Colorado Trails Preservation Alliance president and the president of the Early Childhood Education Association of Colorado. Previously, he chaired the Colorado Early Education Network.

== Electoral history ==
In the Senate District 13 Republican primary election held June 25, 2024, Bright ran unopposed. In the general election held November 5, 2024, Bright defeated Democrat Matt Johnston, winning 56.28% of the total votes cast.
