= Mary Hodge =

American politician

Member of the Colorado Senate from the 25th district
- In office January 7, 2009 – January 11, 2017
- Preceded by: Stephanie Takis
- Succeeded by: Kevin Priola

Member of the Colorado House of Representatives from the 30th district
- In office January, 2003 – January 7, 2009
- Succeeded by: Kevin Priola

Member of the Colorado House of Representatives from the 36th district
- In office January, 2001 – January, 2003

Personal details
- Born: December 17, 1946 (age 79) Saint Francis, Kansas
- Party: Democratic

Mary Hodge (born December 17, 1946) is a former state senator in the U.S. state of Colorado. Elected to the Colorado State Senate as a Democrat in 2008, Hodge represented Senate District 25, which encompasses eastern Adams County, Colorado. Term limited, she could not seek re-election in 2016. Prior to being elected to the state senate, Hodge served in the Colorado House of Representatives for eight years.

== Biography ==
Senator Mary Hodge (Brighton) has a hands-on knowledge of education and small business issues. Her experience in these fields taught her the importance of patience, hard work, dedication, cooperation, and compromise. These traits served her well during her eight years as House District 30's State Representative and as a State Senator. Senator Hodge has experience with agriculture, water, education and business. She and her husband, Richard, own and operate a small business. Senator Hodge currently serves as Chair of the Agriculture, Livestock, and Natural Resources, and serves on the Appropriations Committee, Local Government and Energy Committee and the Interim Water Resources Committee.

== Legislative career ==
=== 2008 election ===
Hodge faced Republican John Hadfield in the November 2008 general election. Hodge's candidacy was endorsed by the Denver Post and the Aurora Sentinel.
