= Kevin Priola =

American politician

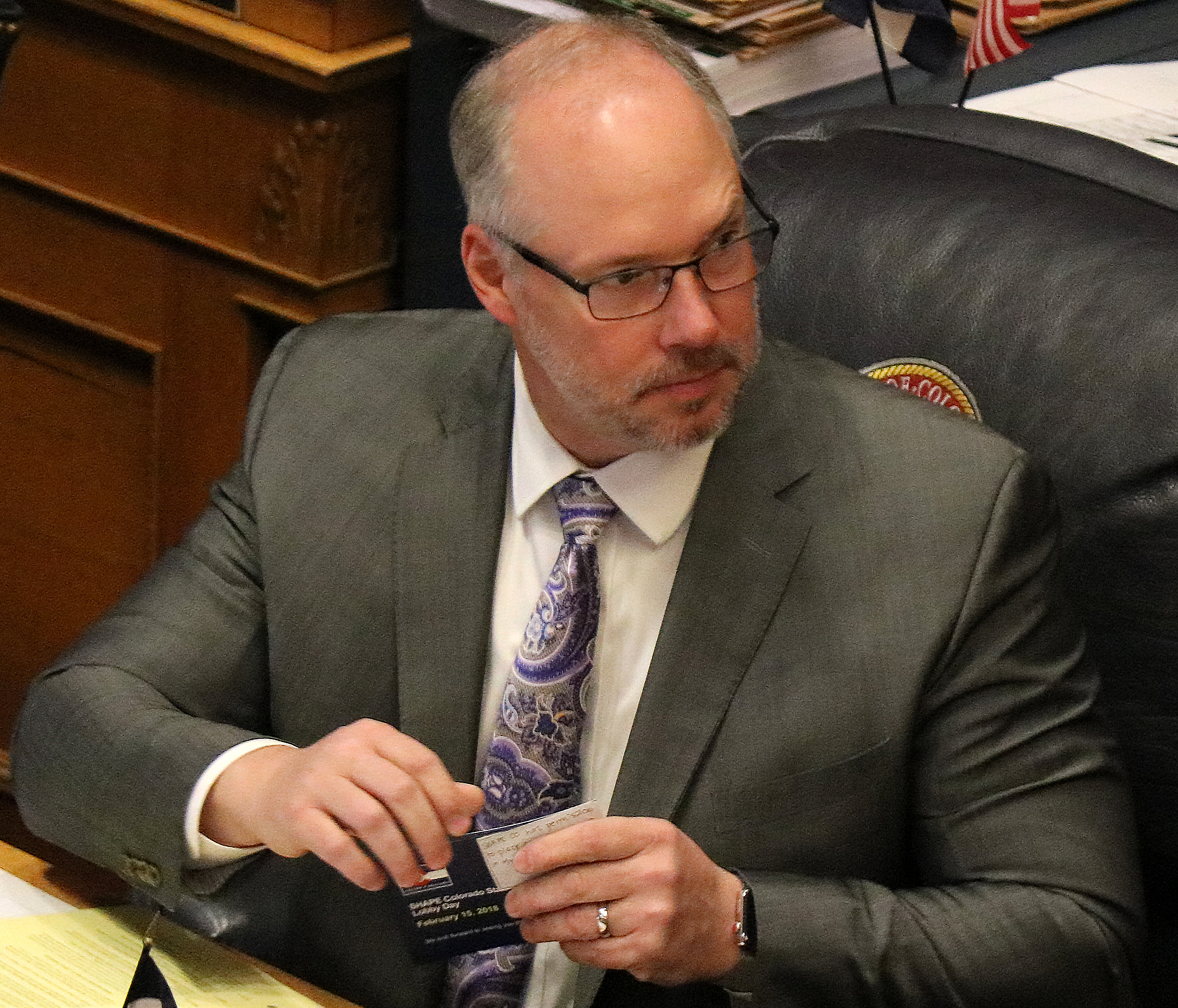

Member of the Colorado Senate from the 13th district
- In office January 9, 2023 – January 8, 2025
- Preceded by: Redistricted
- Succeeded by: Scott Bright

Member of the Colorado Senate from the 25th district
- In office January 11, 2017 – January 9, 2023
- Preceded by: Mary Hodge
- Succeeded by: Redistricted

Member of the Colorado House of Representatives
- In office January 9, 2013 – January 11, 2017
- Preceded by: Christine Scanlan
- Succeeded by: Philip Covarrubias
- Constituency: 56th district
- In office January 14, 2009 – January 9, 2013
- Preceded by: Mary Hodge
- Succeeded by: Jenise May
- Constituency: 30th District

Personal details
- Born: Brighton, Colorado, U.S.
- Party: Democratic (2022–present); Republican (1990–2022)
- Spouse: Michelle
- Children: 4

Kevin Priola is an American politician who served in the Colorado Senate from the 13th district as a member of the Democratic Party. Prior to decennial redistricting he also represented the 25th district. Prior to his tenure in the state senate he served in the Colorado House of Representatives from the 30th and 56th districts from 2009 to 2017. Until 2022, he served as a member of the Republican Party.

Priola was born in Brighton, Colorado, and educated at the University of Colorado Boulder where he joined the College Republicans. He joined the Republican Party at age seventeen and was elected to the state house from the 30th district in the 2008 election. During his tenure in the state house he served as a whip, but resigned in 2014 following an unsuccessful attempt to remove him. He was elected to the state senate in the 2016 election, but joined the Democrats in 2022, citing Republican attempts to overturn the 2020 presidential election.

== Early life ==
Kevin Priola was born in Brighton, Colorado. He attended the University of Colorado Boulder from 1992 to 1996, and graduated with a Bachelor of Science degree in finance and accounting and a minor in economics. He became a Republican at age seventeen and was a member of the College Republicans. He married Michelle, with whom he had four children. He was involved with the University of Colorado's Ralphie program, which runs a buffalo on the field at football games.

== Career ==
Priola ran for the Republican nomination for a seat in the Colorado House of Representatives in the 30th district in the 2008 election and won in the general election against Democratic nominee Dave Rose. He defeated Democratic nominee Laura Huerta in the 2010 election. He defeated Democratic nominee Rose and Libertarian nominee Will Hiltscher in the 2012 election. He defeated Democratic nominee Vicki A. Snider and Libertarian nominee Chris Baerns in the 2014 election.

Priola ran for a seat in the Colorado Senate from the 25th district and defeated Democratic nominee Jenise May in the 2016 election. He defeated Democratic nominee Paula Dickerson in the 2020 election. He over-performed Donald Trump by over 10% in the 2020 election in his district. Priola was redistricted into the 13th district.

He served as a whip during his tenure in the state house, but resigned from his position in 2014, the day after Representative Chris Holbert unsuccessfully attempted to have him removed from the position due to Priola not supporting a Republican amendment to legislation. During his tenure in the state senate he served on the Business, Labor and Technology, and Education committees. He was considered as a possible running mate for Walker Stapleton in the 2018 gubernatorial election, but Lang Sias was selected instead.

On August 22, 2022, Priola announced he was leaving the Republican Party and joining the Democratic Party, citing Republicans' attempts to overturn the 2020 election and denial of climate change. Priola's wife, Michelle, is a plaintiff on Anderson v. Griswold.

== Political positions ==
Priola is considered a moderate in his district, and has worked with Democrats in sponsoring or supporting bipartisan bills. He voted in favor of legislation to allow municipalities to require affordable housing which had been prohibited since a ruling by the Colorado Supreme Court in 2000. He was the only Republican in the state senate to vote in favor of legislation to prevent landlords from using or disclosing the citizenship or immigration status of their tenants.

He sponsored legislation to exempt teachers from the Colorado Open Records Act in order to prevent doxing being conducted against teachers. Priola was the only Republican to vote in favor of legislation to prohibit employers from retaliating against their workers for reporting health and safety concerns or violations.

He co-sponsored legislation to repeal the death penalty, and at one point was the only Republican supporter of the bill, stating that he opposes capital punishment due to his Catholic beliefs and how it disproportionately targets black people. He voted in favor of reducing the sentence of felony murder from life in prison without parole to a maximum of forty-eight years.

He and Senator Brittany Pettersen created legislation to allow for supervised injection sites to combat the opioid epidemic. Patrick Neville, the Republican Minority Leader in the state house, threatened to have recall attempts made against Democratic members of the Colorado General Assembly who supported the legislation, but not against Priola. Priola sponsored legislation to prohibit the selling or marketing of flavored products by cigarette, tobacco, or nicotine retailers.

Priola sponsored legislation in 2014 that would prohibit abortions, except to prevent the death of the mother, and make it a class three felony. He received an F rating from NARAL Pro-Choice America.

He voted in favor of legislation to allow transgender and nonbinary people to change their names and gender on identifications without surgery or judicial requirements, and voted in favor of legislation to prohibit gay conversion therapy. He cosponsored legislation to make HIV prevention drugs available without the need of a prescription. He has also supported anti-LGBT religious-exemption legislation.

After the January 6 United States Capitol attack, he called for President Trump to be removed from office through either the Twenty-fifth Amendment or impeachment. Priola was the only Republican to vote in favor of a resolution calling for the passage of voting rights legislation at the federal level while fifteen Republican members of the state senate voted in favor of unsuccessful amendments to the resolution thanking the Capitol attackers and decertifying the 2020 presidential election.

== Electoral history ==
2008 Colorado House of Representatives 30th district election
Primary election
Party	Candidate	Votes	%
Republican	Kevin Priola	1,579	100.00%
Total votes		1,579	100.00%
General election
Republican	Kevin Priola	11,936	50.92%
Democratic	Dave Rose	11,505	49.08%
Total votes		23,441	100.00%

2010 Colorado House of Representatives 30th district election
Primary election
Party	Candidate	Votes	%
Republican	Kevin Priola (incumbent)	2,912	100.00%
Total votes		2,912	100.00%
General election
Republican	Kevin Priola (incumbent)	10,612	60.49%
Democratic	Laura Huerta	6,931	39.51%
Total votes		17,543	100.00%

2012 Colorado House of Representatives 56th district election
Primary election
Party	Candidate	Votes	%
Republican	Kevin Priola (incumbent)	4,064	100.00%
Total votes		4,064	100.00%
General election
Republican	Kevin Priola (incumbent)	22,270	58.78%
Democratic	Dave Rose	14,070	37.14%
Libertarian	Will Hiltscher	1,544	4.08%
Total votes		37,884	100.00%

2014 Colorado House of Representatives 56th district election
Primary election
Party	Candidate	Votes	%
Republican	Kevin Priola (incumbent)	5,894	100.00%
Total votes		5,894	100.00%
General election
Republican	Kevin Priola (incumbent)	20,627	63.09%
Democratic	Vicki A. Snider	10,629	32.51%
Libertarian	Chris Baerns	1,439	4.40%
Total votes		32,695	100.00%

2016 Colorado Senate 25th district election
Primary election
Party	Candidate	Votes	%
Republican	Kevin Priola	4,743	100.00%
Total votes		4,743	100.00%
General election
Republican	Kevin Priola	30,074	52.07%
Democratic	Jenise May	27,678	47.93%
Total votes		57,752	100.00%

2020 Colorado Senate 25th district election
Primary election
Party	Candidate	Votes	%
Republican	Kevin Priola (incumbent)	11,135	100.00%
Total votes		11,135	100.00%
General election
Republican	Kevin Priola (incumbent)	37,195	50.84%
Democratic	Paula Dickerson	35,968	49.16%
Total votes		73,163	100.00%
