= Colorado's 13th Senate district =

American legislative district

Colorado's 13th State Senate district
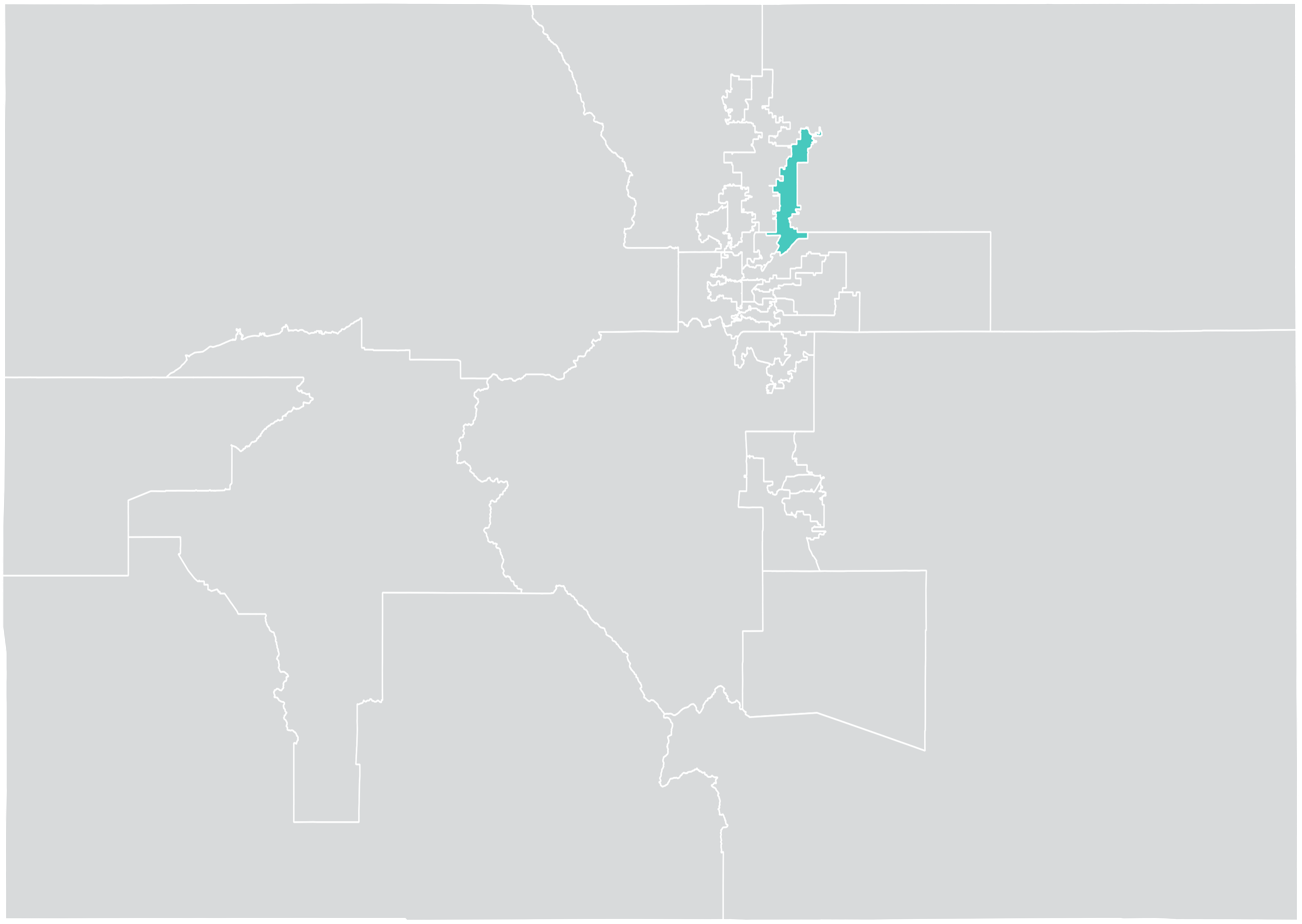
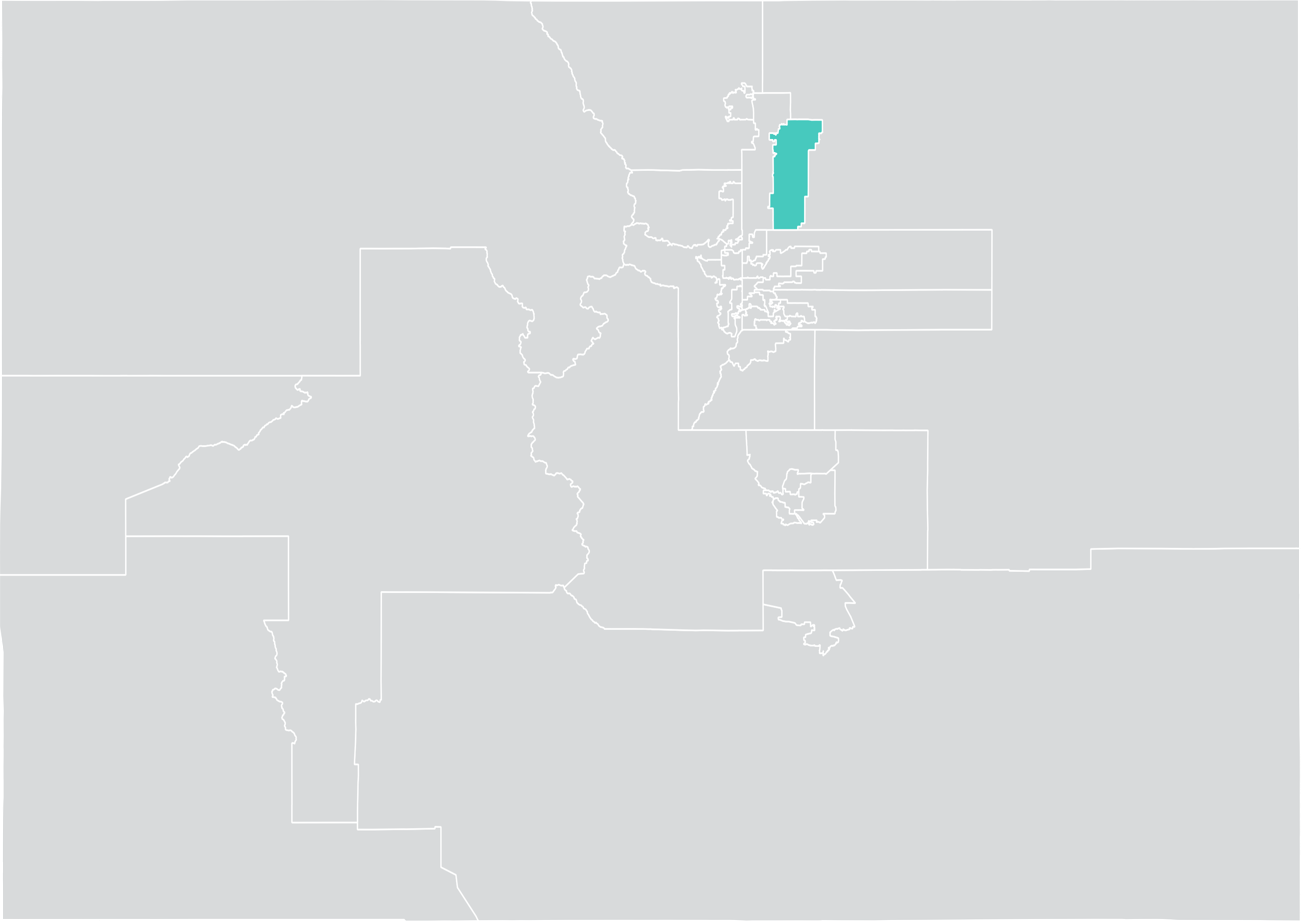
Senator
Scott Bright; R–Platteville
- Registration: 23.5% Republican; 22.7% Democratic; 50.8% No party preference
- Demographics: 56% White; 2% Black; 39% Hispanic; 1% Asian; 2% Other
- Population (2018): 161,147
- Registered voters: 97,022

Colorado's 13th Senate district is one of 35 districts in the Colorado Senate. It has been represented by Republican Scott Bright since January 2025. Prior to redistricting the district was represented by Democrat Kevin Priola.

== Geography ==
District 13 is based around the city of Greeley, also covering the other Weld County communities of Evans, LaSalle, Milliken, Gilcrest, Platteville, and Fort Lupton.

The district is located entirely within Colorado's 4th congressional district, and overlaps with the 48th, 50th, and 63rd districts of the Colorado House of Representatives.

== Recent election results ==
Colorado state senators are elected to staggered four-year terms. The old 13th district held elections in midterm years, but the new district drawn following the 2020 Census will hold elections in presidential years. The first election to occur with the current district lines was in 2024.

Scott Bright was elected to represent the district in the 2024 Colorado Senate election.

=== 2024 ===
2024 Colorado Senate election, District 13
Party	Candidate	Votes	%
Republican	Scott Bright	34,045	56.64
Democratic	Matt Johnson	26,060	43.36
Total votes		60,105	100

=== 2018 ===
2018 Colorado State Senate election, District 13
Party	Candidate	Votes	%
Republican	John Cooke (incumbent)	33,026	58.7
Democratic	Phil Kelley	21,453	38.1
Libertarian	Eric Joss	1,776	3.2
Total votes		56,255	100
Republican hold			

=== 2014 ===
2014 Colorado State Senate election, District 13
Party	Candidate	Votes	%
Republican	John Cooke	26,063	63.7
Democratic	Joe Perez	14,879	36.3
Total votes		40,942	100
Republican hold			

=== Federal and statewide results ===
Year	Office	Results
2020	President	Trump 53.1 – 43.9%
2018	Governor	Stapleton 53.5 – 41.4%
2016	President	Trump 51.5 – 39.3%
2014	Senate	Gardner 55.6 – 36.9%
2014	Governor	Beauprez 53.0 – 41.6%
2012	President	Romney 49.7 – 47.6%
