= Chris Holbert =

American politician (born 1961)

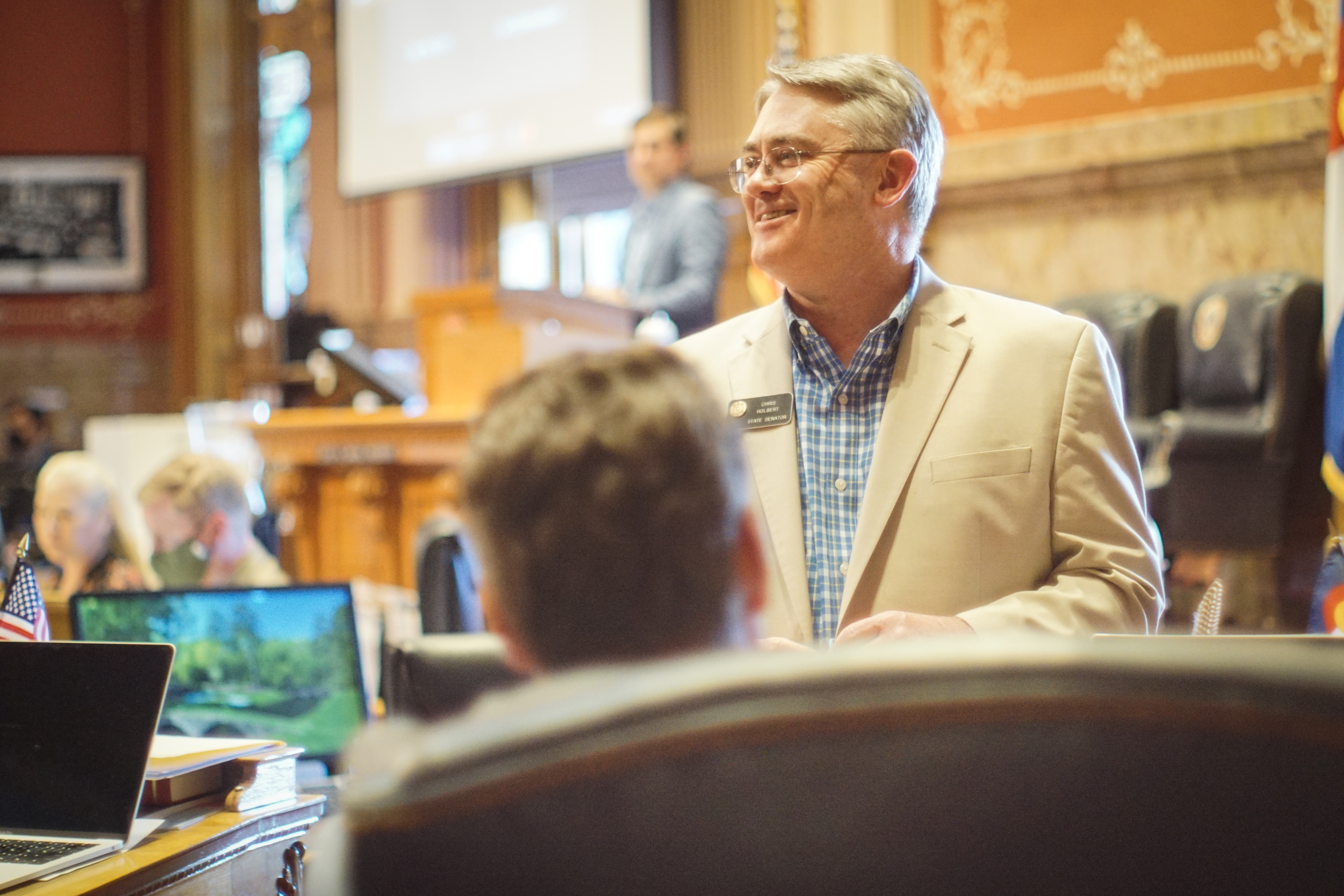

Minority Leader of the Colorado Senate
- In office January 4, 2019 – May 15, 2022
- Preceded by: Leroy Garcia
- Succeeded by: John Cooke

Majority Leader of the Colorado Senate
- In office January 11, 2017 – January 4, 2019
- Preceded by: Mark Scheffel
- Succeeded by: Steve Fenberg

Member of the Colorado Senate from the 30th district
- In office January 6, 2015 – May 31, 2022
- Preceded by: Ted Harvey
- Succeeded by: Kevin Van Winkle

Member of the Colorado House of Representatives from the 44th district
- In office January 12, 2011 – January 7, 2015
- Preceded by: Mike May
- Succeeded by: Kim Ransom

Personal details
- Born: February 6, 1961 (age 65) Omaha, Nebraska, U.S.
- Party: Republican
- Education: Colorado Heights University (BA)

Chris Holbert (born February 6, 1961) is an American politician and a former member of the Colorado Senate from the 30th district. He represented the 30th district from January 6, 2015 until his resignation on May 31, 2022. Previously, he represented the 44th district of the Colorado House of Representatives.

== Early life and education ==
Holbert was born in Omaha, Nebraska. He earned a Bachelor of Liberal Arts from Loretto Heights College (now Colorado Heights University).

== Career ==
Prior to seeking elected office, Holbert was a trade association manager. From 2000 to 2008, Holbert worked as president and executive director of a statewide trade association, where he represented over 6,000 business professionals throughout Colorado.

=== Colorado Legislature ===
Holbert was elected to the Colorado House of Representatives in November 2010 and assumed office in January 2011. He was then elected to the Colorado Senate in November 2014 and assumed office in January 2015. He was elected Senate majority leader in November 2016 and was twice elected as Senate minority leader in November 2018 and November 2020.

=== Resignation ===
On May 2, 2022, Holbert announced his resignation as senate minority leader, effective May 15, 2022, and his resignation from the Colorado Senate, effective May 31, 2022. His resignation letter stated that he and his wife planned to move to Florida and work in the private sector.

== Elections ==
- 2012: Holbert ran unopposed for the June 26, 2012 Republican Primary, winning with 4,063 votes, and won the three-way November 6, 2012 General election with 27,381 votes (64.0%) against Libertarian candidate Jarrod Austin.
- 2010: When District 44 Republican Representative Mike May left the Legislature and left the seat open, Holbert won a three-way Republican Primary in August 2010 with 4,455 votes (39.8%) in a field which included Polly Lawrence (who was elected to the House for District 39 in 2012), and won the November 2, 2010 General election with 28,009 votes (75.21%) against Independent Peter Ericson and Democratic write-in candidate Margie Brown.
- 2014: Holbert was elected to the State Senate seat for District 30.

== Personal life ==
Holbert married his wife, Diane, in 1986. They have two sons.

Colorado Senate
Preceded by Mark Scheffel	Majority Leader of the Colorado Senate; 2017–2019	Succeeded by Steve Fenberg
Preceded by Leroy Garcia	Minority Leader of the Colorado Senate; 2019–2022	Succeeded by John Cooke
