= 2014 Colorado Senate election =

- November 4, 2014

18 of the 35 seats in the Colorado Senate 18 seats needed for a majority
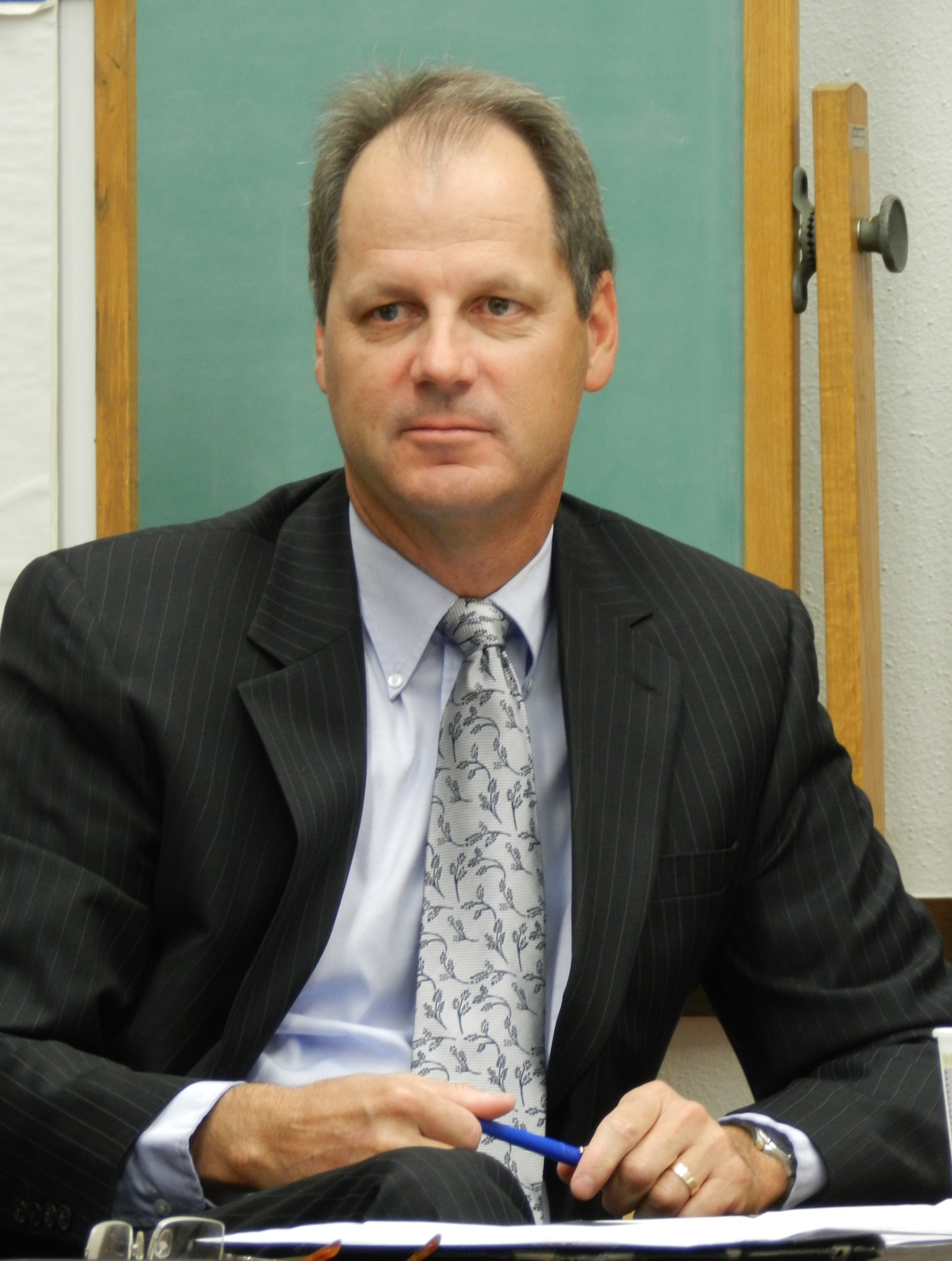

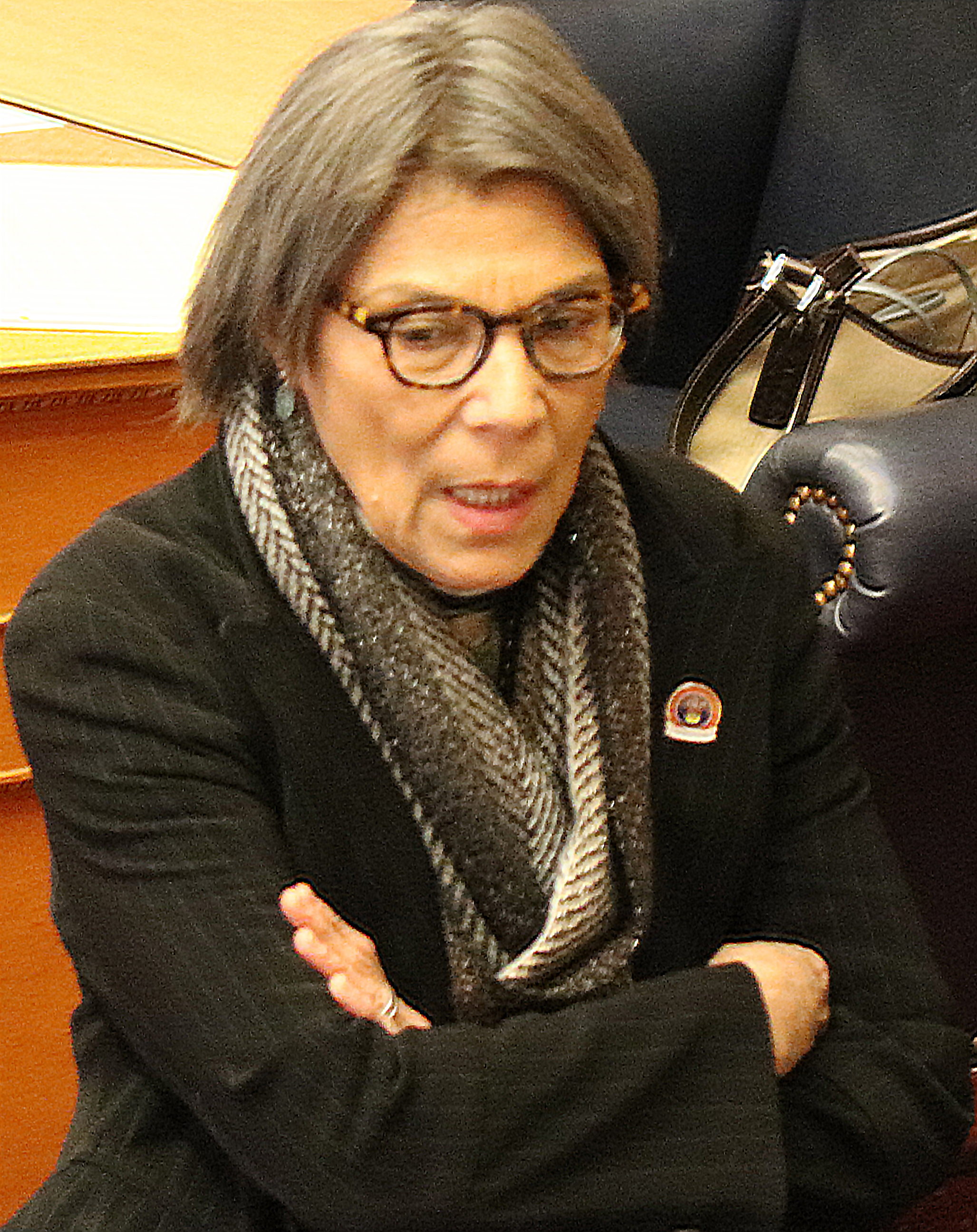
	Majority party	Minority party
Leader	Bill Cadman	Lucía Guzmán
Party	Republican	Democratic
Leader's seat	District 12	District 34
Last election	17	18
Seats won	18	17
Seat change	▲1	▼1
Popular vote	578,797	347,145
Percentage	59.81%	35.87%
Seats up	10	8
Races won	11	7
- Results: Republican gain Democratic gain Republican hold Democratic hold No election
President before election
Morgan Carroll
Democratic
Elected President
Bill Cadman
Republican

The 2014 Colorado Senate elections were held on November 4, 2014 to elect 18 of the 35 members of the Colorado Senate. The election coincided with Colorado House of Representatives elections and other state and federal elections. Primary elections were held on June 24, 2014. Republicans gained control of the chamber for the first time since 2005, gaining one seat.

== Background ==
In the previous state Senate election in 2012, Democrats held the chamber with a 5-seat majority of 20 Democratic seats and 15 Republican seats. However, Democrats had their majority reduced to one seat after the 2013 Colorado recall election, where Senator Angela Giron and Senate President John Morse were successfully recalled and replaced by Republicans. Because of this, Republicans only needed a net gain of one seat in order to claim control of the chamber. Democratic senator Evie Hudak was also targeted in the recall election, however she chose to resign instead, triggering an off-cycle election in district 19.

== Results ==
=== District ===
Results of the 2014 Colorado Senate election by district:

District	Incumbent	Party	Elected Senator	Party
1st	Greg Brophy	Rep	Jerry Sonnenberg	Rep
2nd	Kevin Grantham	Rep	Kevin Grantham	Rep
3rd	George Rivera	Rep	**Leroy Garcia**	Dem
5th	Gail Schwartz	Dem	Kerry Donovan	Dem
6th	Ellen Roberts	Rep	Ellen Roberts	Rep
7th	Steve King	Rep	Ray Scott	Rep
9th	Kent Lambert	Rep	Kent Lambert	Rep
11th	Bernie Herpin	Rep	**Michael Merrifield**	Dem
13th	Scott Renfroe	Rep	John Cooke	Rep
15th	Kevin Lundberg	Rep	Kevin Lundberg	Rep
16th	Jeanne Nicholson	Dem	**Tim Neville**	Rep
19th	Rachel Zenzinger	Dem	**Laura J. Woods**	Rep
20th	Cheri Jahn	Dem	Cheri Jahn	Dem
22nd	Andy Kerr	Dem	Andy Kerr	Dem
24th	Lois Tochtrop	Dem	**Beth Martinez Humenik**	Rep
30th	Ted Harvey	Rep	Chris Holbert	Rep
32nd	Irene Aguilar	Dem	Irene Aguilar	Dem
34th	Lucía Guzmán	Dem	Lucía Guzmán	Dem

Bold - Gain

Italicize - Hold, new member

== Incumbents not seeking re-election ==
=== Term-limited incumbents ===
Five incumbent senators (including three Republicans and two Democrats) are term-limited, and unable to seek a third term.

- Greg Brophy (R), District 1
- Gail Schwartz (D), District 5
- Scott Renfroe (R), District 13
- Lois Tochtrop (D), District 24
- Ted Harvey (R), District 30

=== Retiring incumbents ===
One incumbent Republican is not seeking re-election, despite being able to do so.

- Steve King (R), District 7

== Closest races ==
1. District 20, 0.61%
2. District 19, 1.06% gain
3. District 24, 1.74% gain
4. District 22, 2.24%
5. District 5, 2.32%
6. District 16, 2.73% gain
7. District 3, 9.87% gain

== Predictions ==
Source	Ranking	As of
Governing	Tossup	October 20, 2014

== Detailed results ==
=== District 1 ===
American Constitution Primary
Party	Candidate	Votes	%
American Constitution	Doug Aden	43	100.0
Total votes		43	100.0

Republican Primary
Party	Candidate	Votes	%
Republican	Jerry Sonnenberg	17,965	100.0
Total votes		17,965	100.0

2014 Colorado Senate election, 1st District
Party	Candidate	Votes	%
Republican	Jerry Sonnenberg	45,689	79.01
American Constitution	Doug Aden	7,876	14.7
Total votes		53,565	100.0
Republican hold			

=== District 2 ===
Republican Primary
Party	Candidate	Votes	%
Republican	Kevin Grantham (incumbent)	13,551	100.0
Total votes		13,551	100.0

2014 Colorado Senate election, 2nd District
Party	Candidate	Votes	%
Republican	Kevin Grantham (incumbent)	38,895	74.9%
Green	Martin Wirth	13,019	25.1%
Total votes		53,565	100.0
Republican hold			

=== District 3 ===
Democratic Primary
Party	Candidate	Votes	%
Democratic	Leroy Garcia	9,506	100.0
Total votes		9,506	100.0

Republican Primary
Party	Candidate	Votes	%
Republican	George Rivera (incumbent)	6,877	100.0
Total votes		6,877	100.0

2014 Colorado Senate election, 3rd District
Party	Candidate	Votes	%
Democratic	Leroy Garcia	27,813	54.9%
Republican	George Rivera (incumbent)	22,814	45.1%
Total votes		50,627	100.0
Democratic gain from Republican			

=== District 5 ===
Democratic Primary
Party	Candidate	Votes	%
Democratic	Kerry Donovan	4,835	100.0
Total votes		4,835	100.0

Republican Primary
Party	Candidate	Votes	%
Republican	Don Suppes	7,807	100.0
Total votes		7,807	100.0

2014 Colorado Senate election, 5th District
Party	Candidate	Votes	%
Democratic	Kerry Donovan	27,526	49.0%
Republican	Don Suppres	26,225	46.7%
Libertarian	Lee Mulcahy	2,374	4.2%
Total votes		56,125	100.0
Democratic hold			

=== District 6 ===
Republican Primary
Party	Candidate	Votes	%
Republican	Ellen Roberts (incumbent)	12,605	100.0
Total votes		12,605	100.0

2014 Colorado Senate election, 6th District
Party	Candidate	Votes	%
Republican	Ellen Roberts (incumbent)	43,482	100%
Total votes		43,482	100.0
Republican hold			

=== District 7 ===
Democratic Primary
Party	Candidate	Votes	%
Democratic	Claudette Konola	4,291	100.0
Total votes		4,291	100.0

Republican Primary
Party	Candidate	Votes	%
Republican	Ray Scott	13,212	100.0
Total votes		13,212	100.0

2014 Colorado Senate election, 7th District
Party	Candidate	Votes	%
Republican	Ray Scott	39,580	70.6%
Democratic	Claudette Konola	16,506	29.4%
Total votes		56,086	100.0
Republican hold			

=== District 9 ===
Republican Primary
Party	Candidate	Votes	%
Republican	Kent Lambert (incumbent)	18,095	100.0
Total votes		18,095	100.0

2014 Colorado Senate election, 9th District
Party	Candidate	Votes	%
Republican	Kent Lambert (incumbent)	53,867	100%
Total votes		53,867	100.0
Republican hold			

=== District 11 ===
Democratic Primary
Party	Candidate	Votes	%
Democratic	Michael Merrifield	3,848	100.0
Total votes		3,848	100.0

Republican Primary
Party	Candidate	Votes	%
Republican	Bernie Herpin (incumbent)	5,397	100.0
Total votes		5,397	100.0

2014 Colorado Senate election, 11th District
Party	Candidate	Votes	%
Democratic	Michael Merrifield	18,815	52.2
Republican	Bernie Herpin (incumbent)	14,978	41.5
Libertarian	Norman "Paotie" Dawson	2,282	6.3
Total votes		36,075	100.0
Democratic gain from Republican			

=== District 13 ===
Democratic Primary
Party	Candidate	Votes	%
Democratic	Joe Perez	3,549	100.0
Total votes		3,549	100.0

Republican Primary
Party	Candidate	Votes	%
Republican	John Cooke	9,713	100.0
Total votes		9,713	100.0

2014 Colorado Senate election, 11th District
Party	Candidate	Votes	%
Republican	John Cooke	26,063	63.7
Democratic	Joe Perez	14,879	36.3
Total votes		40,942	100.0
Republican hold			

=== District 15 ===
Republican Primary
Party	Candidate	Votes	%
Republican	Kevin Lundberg (incumbent)	14,407	100.0
Total votes		14,407	100.0

2014 Colorado Senate election, 15th District
Party	Candidate	Votes	%
Republican	Kevin Lundberg (incumbent)	47,581	100%
Total votes		47,581	100.0
Republican hold			

=== District 16 ===
Democratic Primary
Party	Candidate	Votes	%
Democratic	Jeanne Nicholson (incumbent)	6,658	100.0
Total votes		6,658	100.0

Republican Primary
Party	Candidate	Votes	%
Republican	Tim Neville	10,742	100.0
Total votes		10,742	100.0

2014 Colorado Senate election, 16th District
Party	Candidate	Votes	%
Republican	Tim Neville	35,631	51.4
Democratic	Jeanne Nicholson (incumbent)	33,734	48.6
Total votes		69,365	100.0
Republican gain from Democratic			

=== District 19 ===
Democratic Primary
Party	Candidate	Votes	%
Democratic	Rachel Zenzinger (incumbent)	6,254	100.0
Total votes		6,254	100.0

Republican Primary
Party	Candidate	Votes	%
Republican	Laura J. Woods	6,813	55.4
Republican	Lang Sias	5,484	44.6
Total votes		12,297	100.0

2014 Colorado Senate election, 19th District
Party	Candidate	Votes	%
Republican	Laura J. Woods	29,907	47.6
Democratic	Rachel Zenzinger (incumbent)	29,244	46.6
Libertarian	Gregg Miller	3,664	5.8
Total votes		62,815	100.0
Republican gain from Democratic			

=== District 20 ===
Democratic Primary
Party	Candidate	Votes	%
Democratic	Cheri Jahn (incumbent)	7,164	100.0
Total votes		7,164	100.0

Republican Primary
Party	Candidate	Votes	%
Republican	Larry Queen	10,390	100
Total votes		10,390	100.0

2014 Colorado Senate election, 20th District
Party	Candidate	Votes	%
Democratic	Cheri Jahn (incumbent)	33,543	46.8
Republican	Larry Queen	33,104	46.6
Libertarian	Chris Heismann	5,018	7.0
Total votes		71,665	100.0
Democratic hold			

=== District 22 ===
Democratic Primary
Party	Candidate	Votes	%
Democratic	Andy Kerr (incumbent)	5,735	100.0
Total votes		5,735	100.0

Republican Primary
Party	Candidate	Votes	%
Republican	Tony Sanchez	6,848	66.6
Republican	Mario Nicolais	3,441	33.4
Total votes		10,289	100.0

2014 Colorado Senate election, 22nd District
Party	Candidate	Votes	%
Democratic	Andy Kerr (incumbent)	30,510	51.1
Republican	Tony Sanchez	29,174	48.9
Total votes		59,684	100.0
Democratic hold			

=== District 24 ===
Democratic Primary
Party	Candidate	Votes	%
Democratic	Judy Solano	5,666	100.0
Total votes		5,666	100.0

Republican Primary
Party	Candidate	Votes	%
Republican	Beth Martinez Humenik	6,605	100.0
Total votes		6,605	100.0

2014 Colorado Senate election, 16th District
Party	Candidate	Votes	%
Republican	Beth Martinez Humenik	26,164	50.9
Democratic	Judy Solano	25,268	49.1
Total votes		51,432	100.0
Republican gain from Democratic			

=== District 30 ===
Democratic Primary
Party	Candidate	Votes	%
Democratic	Bette Davis	4,159	100.0
Total votes		4,159	100.0

Republican Primary
Party	Candidate	Votes	%
Republican	Chris Holbert	12,299	100.0
Total votes		12,299	100.0

2014 Colorado Senate election, 30th District
Party	Candidate	Votes	%
Republican	Chris Holbert	39,897	62.5
Democratic	Bette Davis	21,566	33.8
Libertarian	Eric Price	2,359	3.7
Total votes		63,822	100.0
Republican hold			

=== District 32 ===
Democratic Primary
Party	Candidate	Votes	%
Democratic	Irene Aguilar (incumbent)	8,959	100.0
Total votes		8,959	100.0

Republican Primary
Party	Candidate	Votes	%
Republican	Dawne Murray	4,505	100
Total votes		4,505	100.0

2014 Colorado Senate election, 32nd District
Party	Candidate	Votes	%
Democratic	Irene Aguilar (incumbent)	35,852	64.3
Republican	Dawne Murray	17,356	31.1
Libertarian	Darrell Dinges	2,560	4.6
Total votes		55,768	100.0
Democratic hold			

=== District 34 ===
Democratic Primary
Party	Candidate	Votes	%
Democratic	Lucía Guzmán (incumbent)	6,507	100.0
Total votes		6,507	100.0

Republican Primary
Party	Candidate	Votes	%
Republican	Stuart Siffring	1,814	100
Total votes		1,814	100.0

2014 Colorado Senate election, 34th District
Party	Candidate	Votes	%
Democratic	Lucía Guzmán (incumbent)	31,889	74.4
Republican	Stuart Siffring	8,390	19.6
Libertarian	Brian Scriber	2,592	6.1
Total votes		42,871	100.0
Democratic hold			
