= 2026 Colorado Senate election =

- November 3, 2026

18 of the 35 seats in the Colorado Senate 18 seats needed for a majority
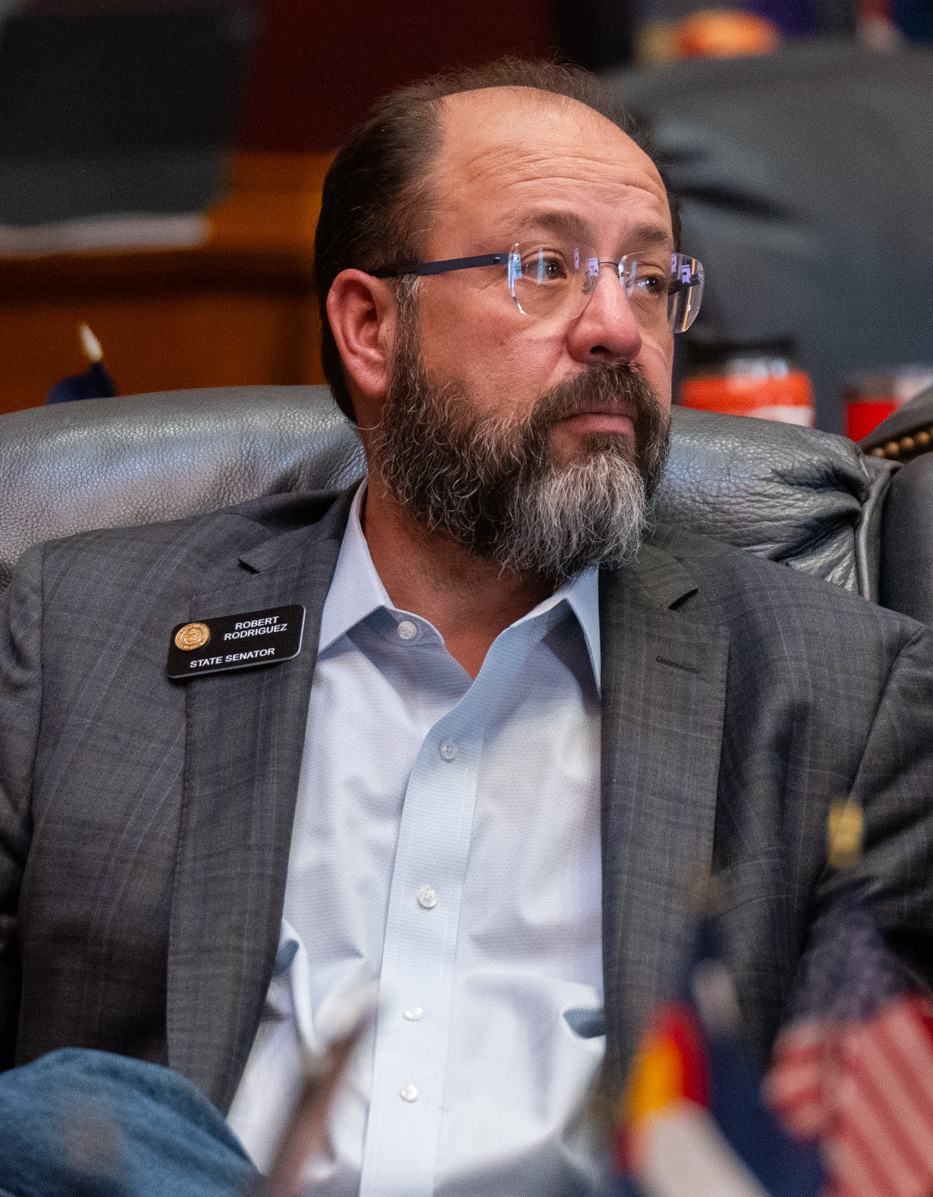

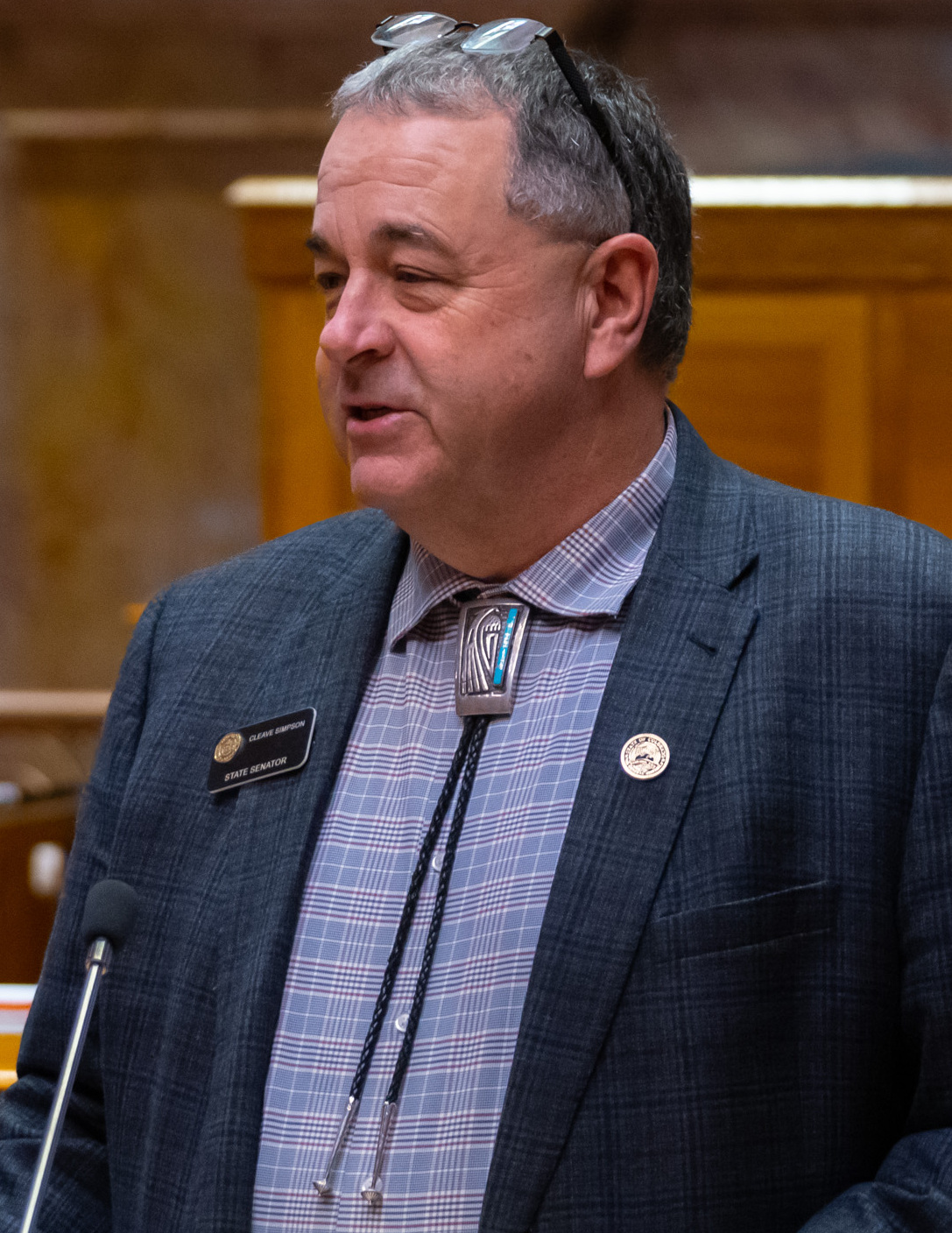
	Majority party	Minority party
Leader	Robert Rodriguez (term-limited)	Cleave Simpson
Party	Democratic	Republican
Leader since	September 8, 2023	June 12, 2025
Leader's seat	32nd–Denver	6th–Alamosa
Last election	12 seats, 56.35%	6 seats, 41.01%
Seats before	23	12
Seats after	24	11
Seat change	▲1	▼1
Swing	▲7.30 pp
Seats up	11	6
- Map of the incumbents: Democratic incumbent Democratic incumbent retiring or term-limited Republican incumbent Republican incumbent retiring or term-limited Vacant No election
President of the Senate before election
James Coleman
Democratic
Elected President of the Senate
James Coleman
Democratic

The 2026 Colorado Senate election was held on November 3, 2026. Voters in 18 out of the 35 districts of the state Senate elected their representative for a four-year term. This election coincided with other Colorado elections of the same year and the biennial United States elections.

== Background ==
Harris 40–50% 50–60% 60–70% 70–80% 80-90% / Trump 40–50% 50–60% 60–70% 70–80%

In the 2024 US Presidential Election, Kamala Harris won 24 districts, while Donald Trump won 11. Republicans represented one district where Harris had won in 2024: District 30 (Harris +2.42%), represented by John Carson. Additionally, one Democrat, Nick Hinrichsen, represented District 3, which Trump won by 5.13%.

== Retiring incumbents ==
=== Democrats ===
- District 3: Nick Hinrichsen is retiring.
- District 20: Lisa Cutter is retiring to run for Jefferson County Commissioner.
- District 22: Jessie Danielson is term-limited and ran for Colorado Secretary of State
- District 32: Robert Rodriguez is term-limited.
- District 34: Julie Gonzales is term-limited and ran for the U.S. Senate

=== Republicans ===
- District 4: Mark Baisley is retiring to run for the U.S. Senate.

== Predictions ==
Source	Ranking	As of
Sabato's Crystal Ball	Safe D	October 16, 2026
State Navigate	Safe D	August 27, 2026

== Incumbents and candidates ==
Dist.	2024 Pres.	Incumbent				This race
Dist.	2024 Pres.	Member	Party	First Elected	Status	Candidates
1st	R +44.4	Byron Pelton	Republican	2022	Incumbent re-elected.	▌ ✓ Byron Pelton (Republican); ▌Jamie Jeffery (Democratic)
3rd	R +5.1	Nick Hinrichsen	Democratic	2022 (appointed)	Incumbent retired. Democratic hold.	▌ ✓ Aaron Gutierrez; ▌Dana Charles
4th	R +17.2	Mark Baisley	Republican	2022	Incumbent retired. Republican hold.	▌ ✓ Teddy Collins (Republican); ▌Justin Kurth (Democratic)
7th	R +24.8	Janice Rich	Republican	2022	Incumbent re-elected.	▌ ✓ Janice Rich (Republican)
8th	D +10.2	Dylan Roberts	Democratic	2022	Incumbent re-elected.	▌ ✓ Dylan Roberts (Democratic); ▌Corey Marshall (Republican)
9th	R +14.6	Lynda Zamora Wilson	Republican	2025 (appointed)	Incumbent lost renomination. Republican hold.	▌ ✓ Terri Carver (Republican); ▌William Delano Moses III (Democratic)
11th	D +4.3	Tony Exum	Democratic	2022	Incumbent re-elected.	▌ ✓ Tony Exum (Democratic); ▌Levon Stilson (Republican); ▌Janet Turner (Libertarian)
15th	D +7.7	Janice Marchman	Democratic	2022	Incumbent re-elected.	▌ ✓ Janice Marchman (Democratic); ▌Rob Woodward (Republican)
20th	D +17.3	Lisa Cutter	Democratic	2022	Incumbent retired. Democratic hold.	▌ ✓ Sheila Lieder (Democratic); ▌Richard Mancuso (Republican)
22nd	D +32.9	Jessie Danielson	Democratic	2018	Incumbent retired. Democratic hold.	▌ ✓ Monica Duran (Democratic); ▌Steve Harkess (Republican)
24th	D +6.7	Kyle Mullica	Democratic	2022	Incumbent re-elected.	▌ ✓ Kyle Mullica (Democratic); ▌Kevin Allen (Republican)
25th	D +23.1	William Lindstedt	Democratic	2026 (appointed)	Incumbent re-elected.	▌ ✓ William Lindstedt (Democratic); ▌Rich Guggenheim (Republican); ▌Mark Philip Bromley (Independent)
27th	D +12.1	Tom Sullivan	Democratic	2022	Incumbent re-elected.	▌ ✓ Tom Sullivan (Democratic); ▌Danielle Lammon (Republican); ▌Michele Poague (Libertarian)
30th	D +2.4	John Carson	Republican	2025 (appointed)	Incumbent lost re-election. Democratic gain.	▌ ✓ Kevin Leung (Democratic); ▌John Carson (Republican)
32nd	D +47.7	Robert Rodriguez	Democratic	2018	Incumbent retired. Democratic hold.	▌ ✓ Emily Sirota (Democratic); ▌Sydnnia Wulff (Republican)
34th	D +57.8	Julie Gonzales	Democratic	2018	Incumbent retired. Democratic hold.	▌ ✓ Chela Garcia Irlando (Democratic); ▌Jack Daus (Republican); ▌Jacob Luria (Libertarian)
35th	R +43.5	Rod Pelton	Republican	2022	Incumbent re-elected.	▌ ✓ Rod Pelton (Republican); ▌Travis Star Nelson (Independent); ▌Richard Graf (Libertarian); ▌Duane Gurule (Democratic)

== Detailed Results ==
District 1 Democratic primary
Party	Candidate	Votes	%
Democratic	Jamie Jeffery	8,930	100.00
Total votes		8,930	100.00

District 1 Republican primary
Party	Candidate	Votes	%
Republican	Byron Pelton (incumbent)	23,402	100.00
Total votes		23,402	100.00

District 1 general election
Party	Candidate	Votes	%
Republican	Byron Pelton (incumbent)		
Democratic	Jamie Jeffery		
Total votes			100.0
