= Aaron Gutierrez =

American politician

Member-elect of the Colorado Senate from the 3rd district
- Assuming office January 2027
- Succeeding: Nick Hinrichsen

Personal details
- Party: Democratic
- Website: www.aaronforpueblo.com

Aaron Gutierrez is an American politician. A member of the Democratic Party, he is the member-elect for the 3rd district of the Colorado State Senate. He was elected at the 2026 election. He is an attorney.
