= Jerry Sonnenberg =

American politician (born 1958)

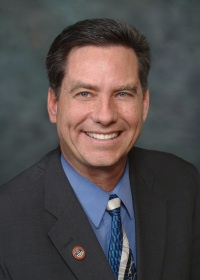

President pro tempore of the Colorado Senate
- In office January 11, 2017 – January 4, 2019
- Preceded by: Ellen Roberts
- Succeeded by: Lois Court

Member of the Colorado Senate from the 1st district
- In office January 7, 2015 – January 9, 2023
- Preceded by: Greg Brophy
- Succeeded by: Byron Pelton

Member of the Colorado House of Representatives from the 65th district
- In office January 10, 2007 – November 4, 2014
- Preceded by: Diane Hoppe
- Succeeded by: Jon Becker

Personal details
- Born: May 1958 (age 68) Sterling, Colorado, U.S.
- Party: Republican
- Spouse: Vonnie Constance
- Children: 4
- Education: Northeastern Junior College

Jerry Sonnenberg (born May 1958) is an American farmer and politician who serves on the Logan County commission. He served in the Colorado Senate from the 1st district as a member of the Republican Party. During his tenure in the state senate he served as the President pro tempore. Prior to his tenure in the state senate he served in the Colorado House of Representatives from the 65th district.

Sonnenberg was born in Sterling, Colorado, and was educated at Sterling High School and Northeastern Junior College. He started farming in 1979, worked as a cattle rancher, and served on the board of the Colorado Farm Bureau. He managed one of Representative Don Ament's campaigns and served as a precinct chair in Logan County, Colorado. He was elected to the state house in the 2006 election and served until he was elected to the state senate in the 2014 election.

== Early life and education ==
Jerry Sonnenberg was born in Sterling, Colorado, and graduated from Sterling High School and Northeastern Junior College. He started farming his family's 7,000 acre farm in 1979, and worked as a cattle rancher, but had to sell his herd of sixty cattle due to a drought in 2002. He married Vonnie Constance, with whom he had four children.

He served on the board of the Colorado Farm Bureau and was later the only farmer in the Colorado House of Representatives. He managed one of Representative Don Ament's campaigns. He served as a precinct chair for the Republican Party in Logan County, Colorado.

== Career ==
=== State legislature ===
Sonnenberg won the Republican nomination and was elected to the Colorado House of Representatives from the 65th district without opposition in the 2006 election. He won reelection in the 2008 election against Dan Conn's write-in candidacy. He faced no opposition in the 2010 and 2012 elections. Sonnenberg and Jon Becker were redistricted into the same district for the 2012 election, but Becker chose to not seek reelection. He defeated American Constitution Party nominee Doug Aden for a seat in the Colorado Senate from the 1st district. He defeated Democratic nominee Debra Gustafson in the 2018 election.

During his tenure in the state house he served on the Agriculture, Livestock and Natural Resources committee. Sonnenberg served as the vice-chair of the Veterans and Military Affairs committee and as the chair of the Agriculture, Natural Resources, and Energy committee in the state senate. On November 10, 2016, he was selected to serve as the President pro tempore of the Senate.

Sonnenberg supported Donald Trump during the 2016 presidential election.

=== Later life ===
Jane Bauder, a member of the Logan County commission from the 3rd district, declined to run for reelection. Sonnenberg won in the 2022 election. He was inducted into the Colorado Agriculture Hall of Fame in February 2023. Sonnenberg announced that he would seek the Republican nomination for Colorado's 4th congressional district in the 2024 election after Ken Buck announced his retirement. He was endorsed by former U.S. Senators Cory Gardner, Hank Brown, and Wayne Allard.

== Political positions ==
Sonnenberg supported Initiative 31 in the 2022 election which would reduce the income tax rate from 4.63% to 4.55%. He opposed repealing the death penalty stating that "I believe that the Bible tells me the direction that I need to go, and why the death penalty is important to society." He voted against allowing civil unions for same-sex couples. His scores from the American Civil Liberties Union ranged from 44% in 2013, 28.6% in 2014, 60% in 2015, 33.3% in 2016, 66.6% in 2017, 20% in 2018, and 0% in 2019.

Sonnenberg received a F rating from NARAL Pro-Choice America. He supports a national ban on abortion.

== Electoral history ==
2006 Colorado House of Representatives 65th district Republican primary
Party	Candidate	Votes	%	±%
Republican	Jerry Sonnenberg	5,085	100.00%	
Total votes		5,085	100.00%	

2006 Colorado House of Representatives 65th district election
Party	Candidate	Votes	%	±%
Republican	Jerry Sonnenberg	19,245	100.00%	
Total votes		19,245	100.00%	

2008 Colorado House of Representatives 65th district Republican primary
Party	Candidate	Votes	%	±%
Republican	Jerry Sonnenberg (incumbent)	4,697	100.00%	
Total votes		4,697	100.00%	

2008 Colorado House of Representatives 65th district election
Party	Candidate	Votes	%	±%
Republican	Jerry Sonnenberg (incumbent)	25,685	98.56%	
Write-In	Dan Conn	375	1.44%	
Total votes		26,060	100.00%	

2010 Colorado House of Representatives 65th district Republican primary
Party	Candidate	Votes	%	±%
Republican	Jerry Sonnenberg (incumbent)	7,872	100.00%	
Total votes		7,872	100.00%	

2010 Colorado House of Representatives 65th district election
Party	Candidate	Votes	%	±%
Republican	Jerry Sonnenberg (incumbent)	21,951	100.00%	
Total votes		21,951	100.00%	

2012 Colorado House of Representatives 65th district Republican primary
Party	Candidate	Votes	%	±%
Republican	Jerry Sonnenberg (incumbent)	7,252	100.00%	
Total votes		7,252	100.00%	

2012 Colorado House of Representatives 65th district election
Party	Candidate	Votes	%	±%
Republican	Jerry Sonnenberg (incumbent)	26,545	100.00%	
Total votes		26,545	100.00%	

2014 Colorado Senate 1st district Republican primary
Party	Candidate	Votes	%	±%
Republican	Jerry Sonnenberg	17,965	100.00%	
Total votes		17,965	100.00%	

2014 Colorado Senate 1st district election
Party	Candidate	Votes	%	±%
Republican	Jerry Sonnenberg	45,689	85.30%	
Constitution	Doug Aden	7,876	14.70%	
Total votes		53,565	100.00%	

2018 Colorado Senate 1st district Republican primary
Party	Candidate	Votes	%	±%
Republican	Jerry Sonnenberg (incumbent)	23,879	100.00%	
Total votes		23,879	100.00%	

2018 Colorado Senate 1st district election
Party	Candidate	Votes	%	±%
Republican	Jerry Sonnenberg	52,311	79.01%	
Democratic	Debra Gustafson	13,894	20.99%	
Total votes		66,205	100.00%	

2022 Logan County Commission 3rd district Republican primary
Party	Candidate	Votes	%	±%
Republican	Jerry Sonnenberg	3,475	100.00%	
Total votes		3,475	100.00%	

Colorado Senate
Preceded by Ellen Roberts	President pro tempore of the Colorado Senate; 2017–2019	Succeeded by Lois Court
