= George Rivera =

American politician

Member of the Colorado Senate from the 3rd district
- In office September 11, 2013 – January 7, 2015
- Preceded by: Angela Giron
- Succeeded by: Leroy Garcia

Personal details
- Born: 1948 Pueblo, Colorado, U.S.
- Died: 10/03/2024
- Party: Republican
- Spouse: Kathryn
- Profession: Colorado State Senator

George Rivera is a former member of the Colorado Senate elected in a September 10, 2013 recall election to replace Angela Giron. Rivera was elected from Colorado's State Senate District 3, which includes Pueblo, Colorado. Giron was the second ever Colorado legislator to be successfully recalled in the state's history.

== Life and career ==
Rivera was born in Pueblo, Colorado in 1948 and grew up on the city's east side. His parents arrived in Pueblo in 1948 after crossing into the U.S. illegally from Mexico. In 1963 they returned to Mexico (along with Rivera's grandmother) to process their visas and returned to the U.S. legally, later becoming U.S. citizens.

Rivera attended Catholic schools for 12 years, first at St. Leander's Grade School and graduated in 1966 from Pueblo Catholic High School (which became Roncalli Middle School in the early 1970s). He has an associate degree in General Studies from Pueblo Community College.

He joined the Pueblo Police Department in 1971 and served as a Patrolman, Corporal, Sergeant, Captain and Deputy Chief, before retiring in 2005. He is married to Kathryn and they have two children, George and Jennifer, as well as step-children Brandon, Rachel, and Victor. They also have a granddaughter Sarah. Rivera has one brother, Juan Rivera, and two sisters, Lucia Rivera-Aragon and Martha Yarusso.

== Political positions ==
Rivera supports a statewide school voucher system. He is also an advocate for lessened regulations on guns.

== See also ==
- Colorado's 3rd congressional district
