= Don Ament =

American politician

Member of the Colorado House of Representatives from the 65th district
- In office January 13, 1999 – January 10, 2001
- Preceded by: Marilyn Musgrave
- Succeeded by: Diane Hoppe
- In office January 14, 1987 – January 9, 1991
- Preceded by: John Hamlin
- Succeeded by: Robert Eisenach

Member of the Colorado Senate from the 1st district
- In office January 9, 1991 – January 13, 1999
- Preceded by: Jim Brandon
- Succeeded by: Marilyn Musgrave

Personal details
- Born: August 4, 1942 (age 83) Denver, Colorado
- Party: Republican

Don Ament (born August 4, 1942) is an American politician who served in the Colorado House of Representatives from the 65th district from 1987 to 1991 and from 1999 to 2001 and in the Colorado Senate from the 1st district from 1991 to 1999.
