= Irene Aguilar =

American politician (born 1960)

Member of the Colorado Senate from the 32nd district
- In office January 2011 – January 4, 2019
- Preceded by: Chris Romer
- Succeeded by: Robert Rodriguez

Personal details
- Born: April 5, 1960 (age 66) Chicago, Illinois, U.S.
- Party: Democratic
- Spouse(s): Thomas W. Bost, MD
- Profession: Doctor

Irene Aguilar (born April 5, 1960) is a former Democratic member of the Colorado Senate. She represented the 32nd district from 2011 to early 2019. Her district encompassed part of the city of Denver, Colorado.

== Personal life and education ==
Born in Chicago, Illinois, Aguilar completed her undergraduate degree at Washington University in St. Louis. She received a medical degree from University of Chicago- Pritzker School of Medicine.

== Career ==
Aguilar was appointed by Governor Romer to the Colorado Board of Medical Examiners in 1993, where she served for eight years. She has since continued to serve the board as a consultant. She was appointed to her first term in the State Senate in December 2010 after being chosen by a vacancy committee to replace Sen. Chris Romer.

In the 2011 session of the Colorado General Assembly, Aguilar was Vice-Chair of the Business, Labor and Technology Committee, and a member of the Health and Human Services Committee and the Local Government and Energy Committee.
