= Greg Brophy =

American politician

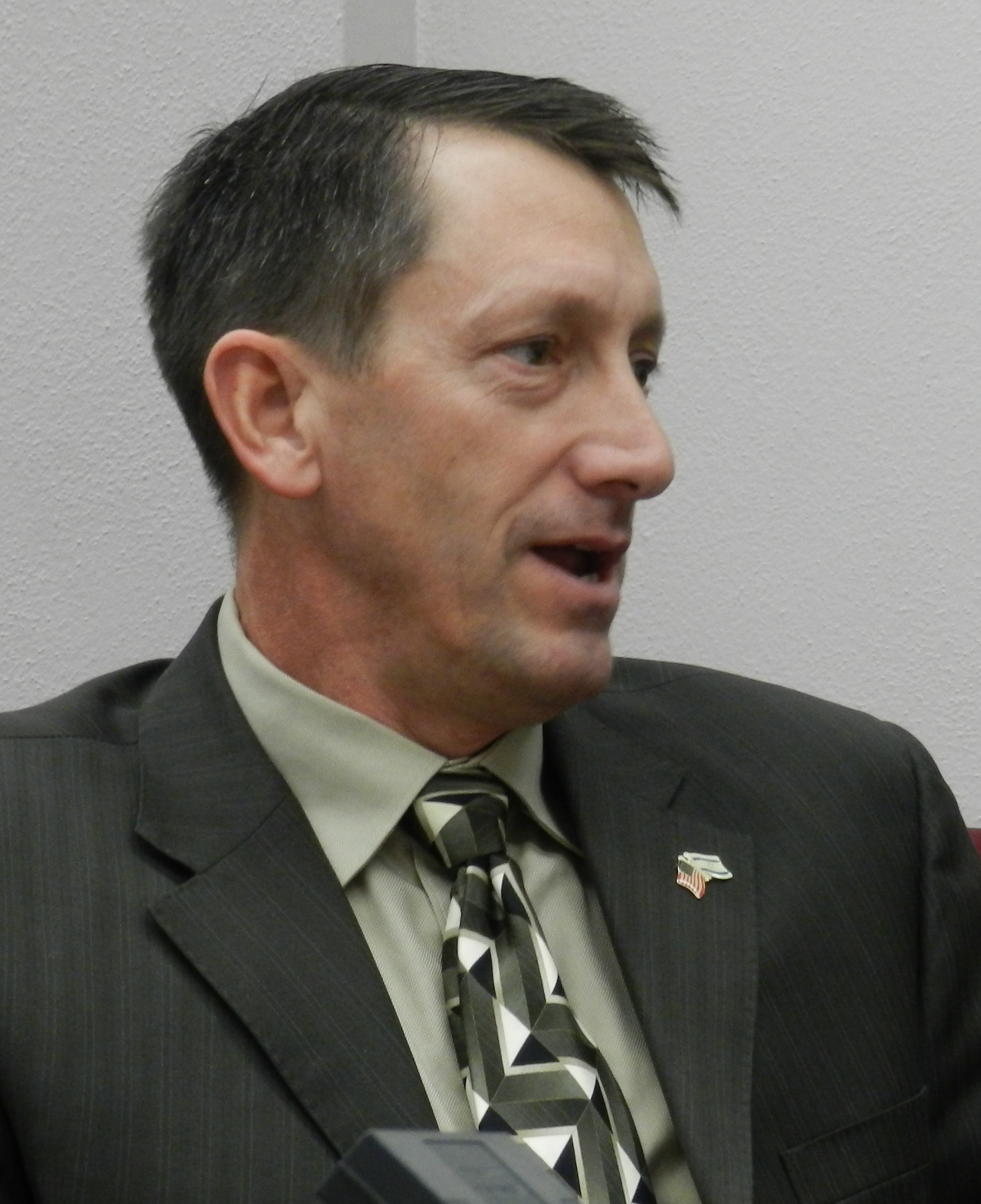

Member of the Colorado Senate from the 1st district
- In office 2005–2015
- Preceded by: Mark Hillman
- Succeeded by: Jerry Sonnenberg

Member of the Colorado House of Representatives from the 63rd district
- In office 2003–2005
- Preceded by: Brad Young
- Succeeded by: Cory Gardner

Personal details
- Born: Holyoke, Colorado, U.S.
- Party: Republican
- Spouse: Angela
- Education: Colorado State University

Greg Brophy is an American politician who served in the Colorado House of Representatives from the 63rd district from 2003 to 2005, and in the Colorado Senate from the 1st district from 2005 to 2015, as a member of the Republican Party.

== Early life and education ==
Greg Brophy was born in Holyoke, Colorado. Brophy graduated from Wray High School. He graduated from Colorado State University with a degree in animal sciences in 1988. He married Angela, with whom he had three children.

== Career ==
=== Colorado House of Representatives ===
Brophy was elected to the Colorado House of Representatives from the 63rd district after defeating Jack Darnell in the Republican Party and defeating Libertarian nominee Gene Leverett in the general election. He won reelection in the 2004 election after defeating Democratic nominee James L. Bowen.

Brophy attempted to have Judge John W. Coughlin impeached in 2003, claiming that he was an activist judge and based mainly on a ruling by Coughlin in a custody case. Coughlin ruled that Cheryl Clark, who had been a lesbian with Elsey McLeod until Clark became a Christian and anti-homosexual, could not expose her adopted daughter to homophobic teachings and Coughlin gave joint custody. The Judiciary committee voted eight to three against Brophy's resolution.

=== Colorado Senate ===
Colorado State Treasurer Mike Coffman left his position to serve in Iraq in 2005. Senator Mark Hillman was selected by Governor Bill Owens to serve as acting treasurer for nine months. The vacancy committee voted twenty-five to twelve in favor of appointing Brophy to fill Hillman's vacant seat on June 19. Cory Gardner was selected to replace Brophy in the state house. He was reelected in the 2006 election against Democratic nominee Bowen and in the 2010 election against Democratic nominee Michael Bowman.

During the 2010 Colorado gubernatorial election he supported an effort to draft Josh Penry into the election. In 2013, he announced that he would seek the Republican nomination for the 2014 gubernatorial election, but only received 18.89% of the delegate vote at the assembly so he did not appear on the primary ballot.

== Later life ==
Brophy worked as the chief of staff for Representatives Ken Buck for fourteen months until 2016.

== Political positions ==
Brophy introduced legislation which would have prohibited illegal immigrants from receiving worker compensation insurance benefits as a way to discourage the employment of illegal immigrants. Brophy co-sponsored a resolution by David Schultheis which would make English the official language of public entities in Colorado, require police to enforce immigration laws, and for voters to prove their citizenship in order to vote.

Brophy opposed the National Popular Vote Interstate Compact which would give Colorado's electoral votes to the winner of the national popular vote in the presidential election stating that it was a "temper tantrum" by Democrats over the results of the 2000 presidential election when George W. Bush won despite losing the popular vote. He opposed legislation that moved Colorado's presidential caucus date to February stating that it would interfere with Colorado's high school basketball tournament.

Brophy opposed a resolution that criticized President Bush for sending more soldiers to Iraq stating that "we ought not to be inflaming passions unnecessarily". He opposed legislation which would require drivers to wear a seatbelt stating that police shouldn't have another reason to pull drivers over. He proposed legislation to have Colorado permanently use daylight saving time, but the legislation failed in the Appropriations senate committee by a vote of six to four.

In 2008, Brophy jokingly offered an amendment to change anti-discrimination legislation that would expand protections to homosexual people to instead protect short people from discrimination. Brophy later withdrew the amendment and apologized for it after Senator Jennifer Veiga criticized him.

== Electoral history ==
2002 Colorado House of Representatives 63rd district election
Primary election
Party	Candidate	Votes	%
Republican	Greg Brophy	5,199	63.05%
Republican	Jack Darnell	3,047	36.95%
Total votes		8,246	100.00%
General election
Republican	Greg Brophy	18,017	85.51%
Libertarian	Gene Leverett	3,053	14.49%
Total votes		21,070	100.00%

2004 Colorado House of Representatives 63rd district election
Primary election
Party	Candidate	Votes	%
Republican	Greg Brophy (incumbent)	6,632	100.00%
Total votes		6,632	100.00%
General election
Republican	Greg Brophy (incumbent)	19,585	74.22%
Democratic	James L. Bowen	6,802	25.78%
Total votes		26,387	100.00%

2006 Colorado Senate 1st district election
Primary election
Party	Candidate	Votes	%
Republican	Greg Brophy (incumbent)	9,707	100.00%
Total votes		9,707	100.00%
General election
Republican	Greg Brophy (incumbent)	29,505	71.38%
Democratic	James L. Bowen	11,833	28.62%
Total votes		41,338	100.00%

2010 Colorado Senate 1st district election
Primary election
Party	Candidate	Votes	%
Republican	Greg Brophy (incumbent)	16,577	100.00%
Total votes		16,577	100.00%
General election
Republican	Greg Brophy (incumbent)	34,632	77.46%
Democratic	James L. Bowen	10,080	22.54%
Total votes		44,712	100.00%
