= Nick Hinrichsen =

American politician

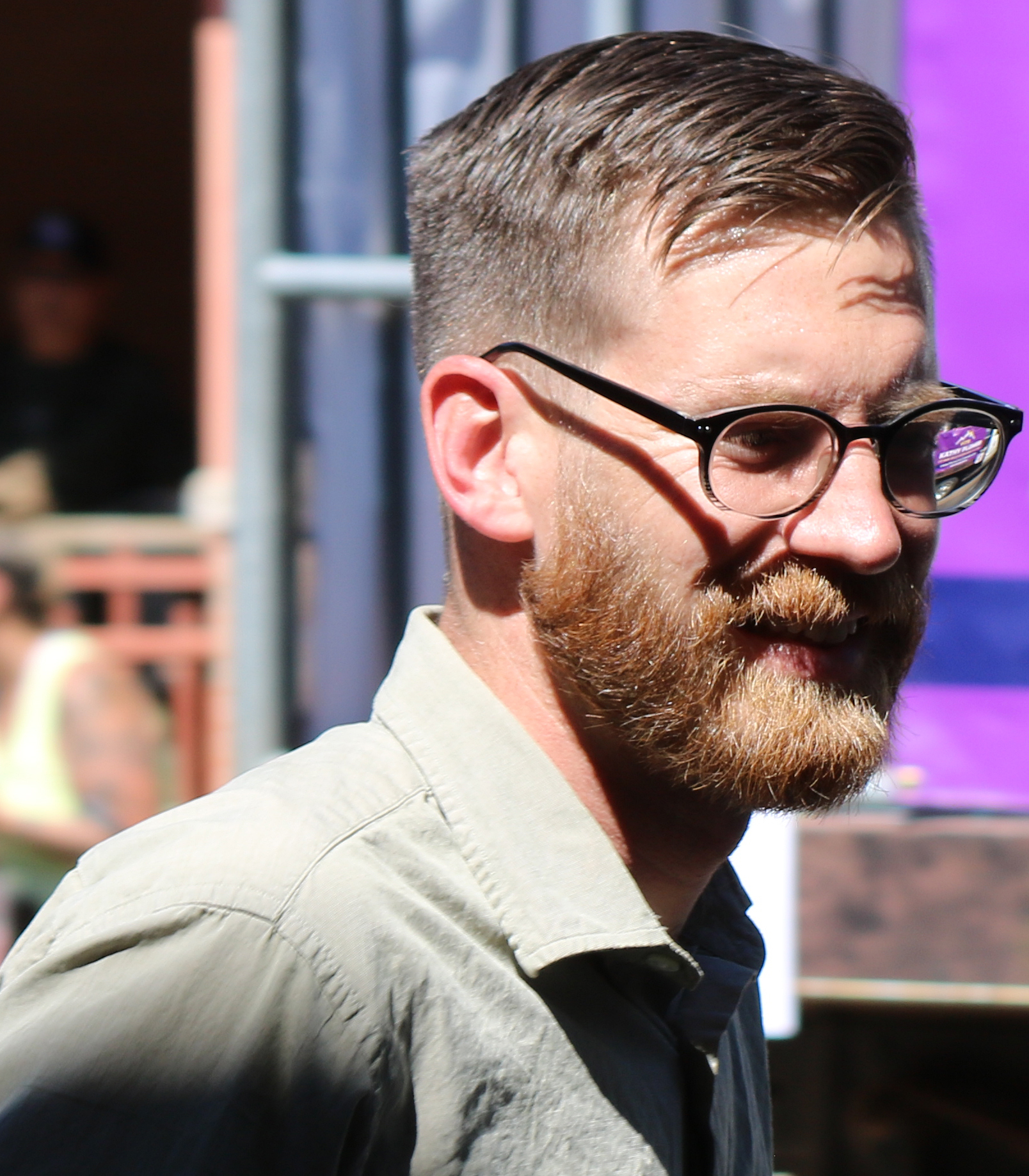
- Hinrichsen in 2022

Member of the Colorado Senate from the 3rd district
- Incumbent
- Assumed office February 23, 2022
- Preceded by: Leroy Garcia
- Succeeded by: Aaron Gutierrez (elect)

Personal details
- Party: Democratic
- Spouse: Brianna Buentello
- Education: University of Colorado Denver

Military service
- Allegiance: United States
- Branch/service: United States Army

Nick Hinrichsen is an American politician currently serving in the Colorado Senate from Colorado's 3rd Senate district. He was appointed to the seat after incumbent Democrat Leroy Garcia resigned to become special assistant to the Assistant Secretary of the Navy for Manpower and Reserve Affairs. He was selected to replace Garcia and was sworn in on February 23, 2022. In November 2022, Hinrichsen was narrowly elected to a full term. In June 2025, he announced that he would not seek reelection in 2026.

He is married to Bri Buentello. In 2022, the couple were important supporters of Adam Frisch in his campaign for US House of Representatives.

== Electoral history ==
2022 Colorado State Senate election, District 3
Party	Candidate	Votes	%
Democratic	Nick Hinrichsen (incumbent)	33,795	51.2
Republican	Stephen Varela	32,090	48.6
Write-in		90	0.1
Total votes		65,975	100
Democratic hold			
