= W. E. Heginbotham House =

Historic house in Colorado, United States

- U.S. National Register of Historic Places
- U.S. Historic district
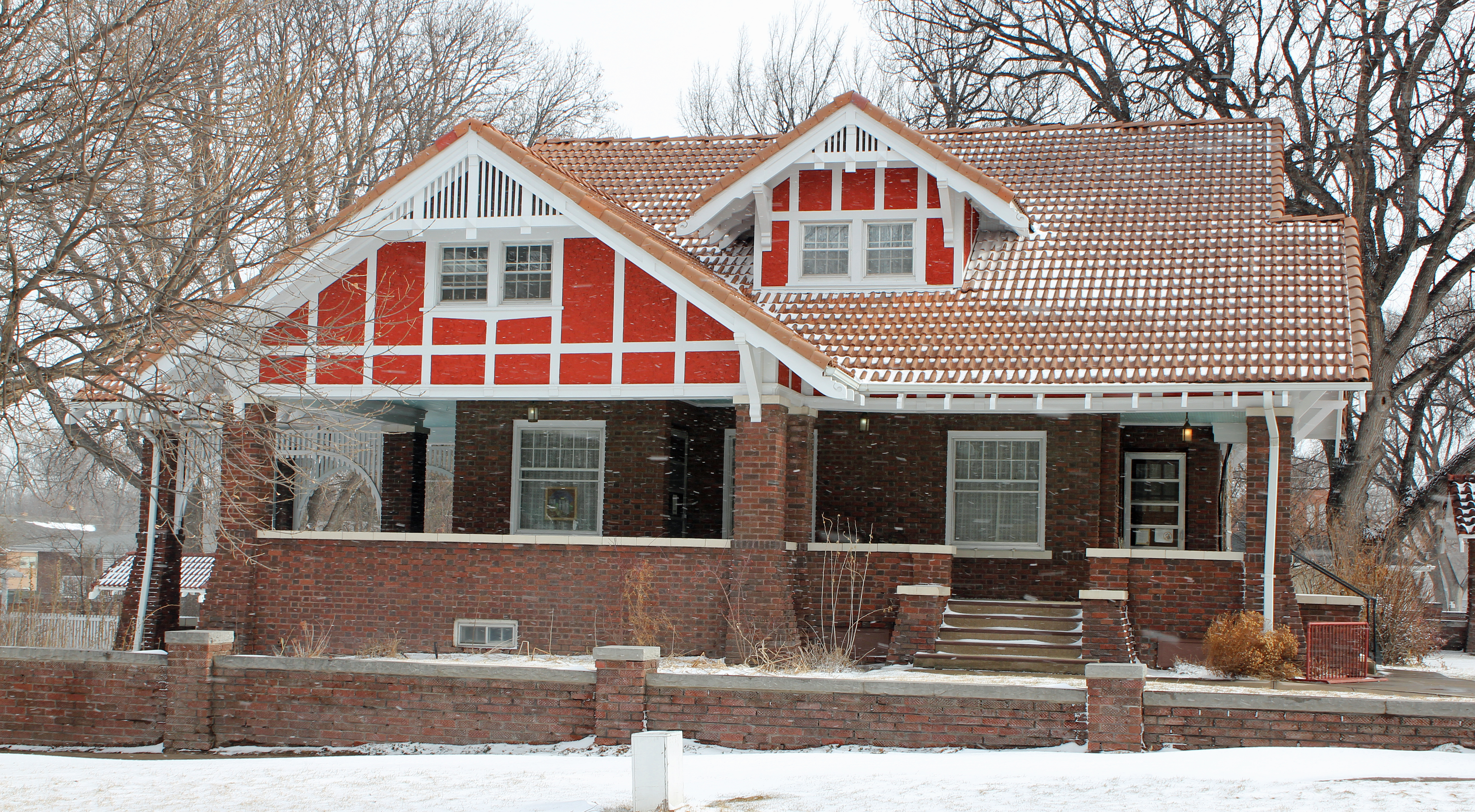

- Location within Colorado Location within the United States
- Location: 539 S. Baxter, Holyoke, Colorado
- Coordinates: 40°34′50″N 102°18′10″W
- Area: less than one acre
- Built: 1919-21
- Built by: McEachern, Michael
- Architectural style: Bungalow/Craftsman
- NRHP reference No.: 88000170
- Added to NRHP: March 8, 1988

The W. E. Heginbotham House, located at 539 S. Baxter in Holyoke, Colorado serves as Holyoke's public library and is known as Heginbotham Library. It is a historic building, was built during 1919–1921, and is listed on the National Register of Historic Places.

It was deemed significant on a statewide level, rather than just locally, for its Craftsman architecture, especially "rare for a sparsely populated rural county", and for its landscaped gardens "which form a remarkable ensemble of designed spaces, plant materials and architectural features that are essentially intact. The house and grounds are an integrated unit, comtemporaneously designed and installed to complement each other. The rooms of the house open onto verandahs and terraces which in turn open onto various gardens and courts following the trend of the Arts and Crafts movement in the early twentieth century."

It was listed on the National Register in 1988. The listing included two contributing buildings, three contributing sites and three other contributing structures.
