= Leroy Garcia =

American politician

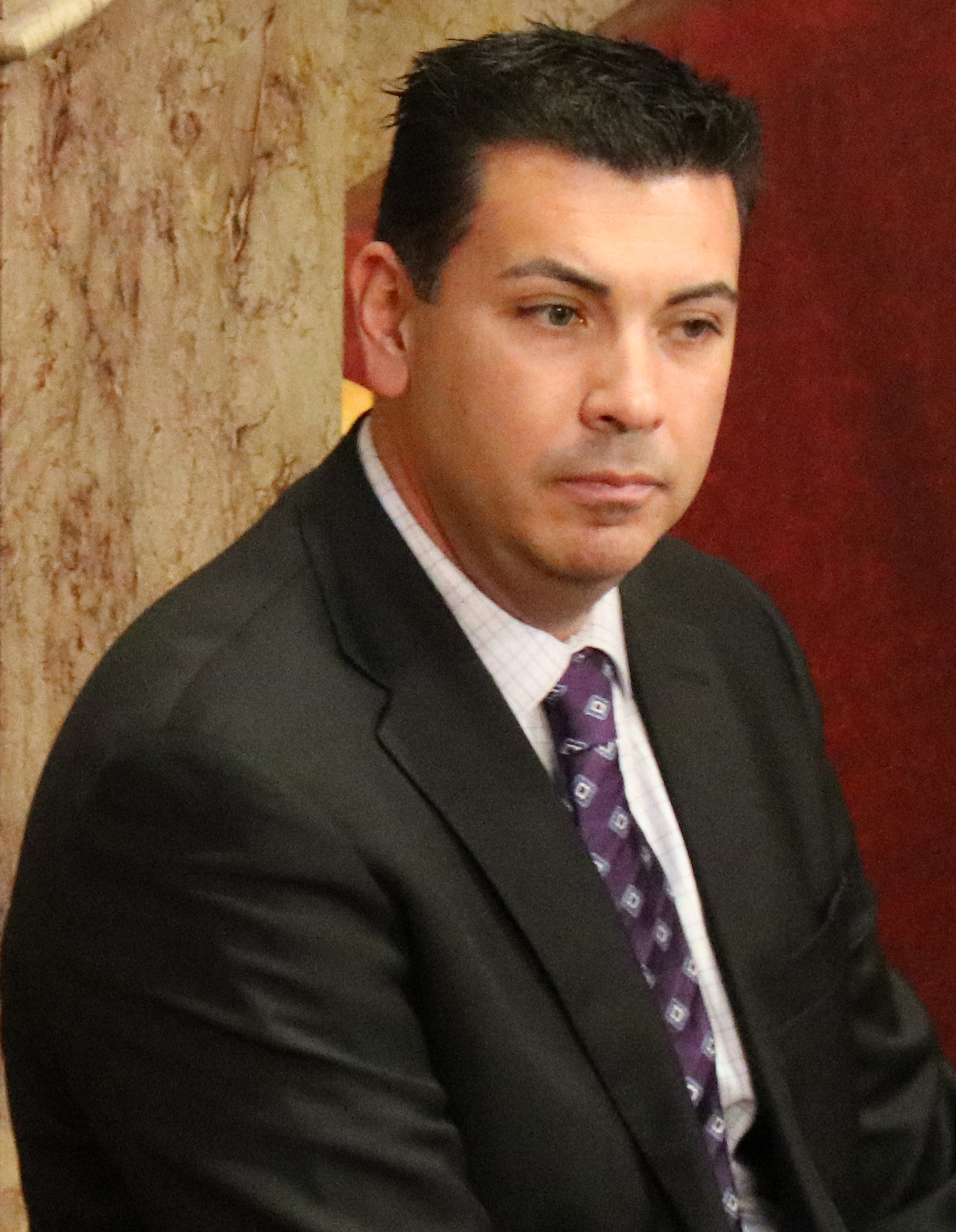

President of the Colorado Senate
- In office January 4, 2019 – February 22, 2022
- Preceded by: Kevin Grantham
- Succeeded by: Steve Fenberg

Minority Leader of the Colorado Senate
- In office March 22, 2018 – January 4, 2019
- Preceded by: Lucía Guzmán
- Succeeded by: Chris Holbert

Member of the Colorado Senate from the 3rd district
- In office January 7, 2015 – February 23, 2022
- Preceded by: George Rivera
- Succeeded by: Nick Hinrichsen

Member of the Colorado House of Representatives from the 46th district
- In office January 9, 2013 – January 7, 2015
- Preceded by: Sal Pace
- Succeeded by: Daneya Esgar

Personal details
- Born: Pueblo, Colorado, U.S.
- Party: Democratic
- Spouse: Michelle
- Children: 2
- Education: Pueblo Community College; University of Phoenix (BA); Ashford University (MA)
- Website: Official website

Military service
- Allegiance: United States
- Branch/service: United States Marine Corps
- Years of service: 2001–2007

Leroy M. Garcia Jr. is an American politician who served in the Colorado Senate from the 3rd district, from 2019 to 2022, as a member of the Democratic Party. He served as the president of the state senate from 2019 until his 2022 resignation to join the Department of Defense and previously served as the Minority Leader from 2018 to 2019. Before his tenure in the state senate, he served in the Colorado House of Representatives from the 46th district from 2013 to 2015 and on the city council in Pueblo, Colorado.

Garcia was born in Pueblo and educated at Pueblo Community College, the University of Phoenix, and Ashford University. He served in the United States Marine Corps from 2001 to 2007 and fought in the 2003 invasion of Iraq. He began his involvement in politics with his election to the city council in Pueblo. He served a term in the state house before being elected to the state senate.

Garcia was selected to serve as the assistant minority leader before switching positions with Minority Leader Lucía Guzmán and was later selected to serve as president of the state senate. An unsuccessful attempt was made to call a recall against him, but the petitioners only submitted four signatures.

== Early life and education ==
Leroy Garcia was born in Pueblo, Colorado. He served in the United States Marine Corps from 2001 to 2007 and was involved in the 2003 invasion of Iraq. He graduated with a degree in emergency medical services from Pueblo Community College, a bachelor's degree in management from the University of Phoenix, and a master's degree in organizational management from Ashford University. He married Michelle, who was later appointed to serve on the Colorado Commission on Judicial Performance by Speaker Dickey Lee Hullinghorst in 2016. The couple has two children. Garcia served on the city council in Pueblo.

== Career ==
=== State legislature ===
==== Elections ====
Garcia won the Democratic nomination for a seat in the Colorado House of Representatives from the 46th district without opposition and defeated Republican nominee Jerry Denney in the 2012 election. During the 2014 election, Garcia won the Democratic nomination for a seat in the Colorado Senate from the 3rd district without opposition and defeated Republican nominee George Rivera. He defeated Libertarian nominee John Pickerill in the 2018 election. He considered running for a seat in the United States House of Representatives from the 3rd congressional district against incumbent Republican Representative Scott Tipton in the 2020 election.

Following the 2018 election, conservative activists filed multiple recall petitions, with support from Republicans in the Colorado General Assembly, with Garcia being included alongside Governor Jared Polis, Senators Brittany Pettersen and Pete Lee, and Representatives Rochelle Galindo and Brianna Buentello. A recall petition for Garcia was approved but failed to receive the 13,506 signatures required, as only four were submitted.

==== Tenure ====
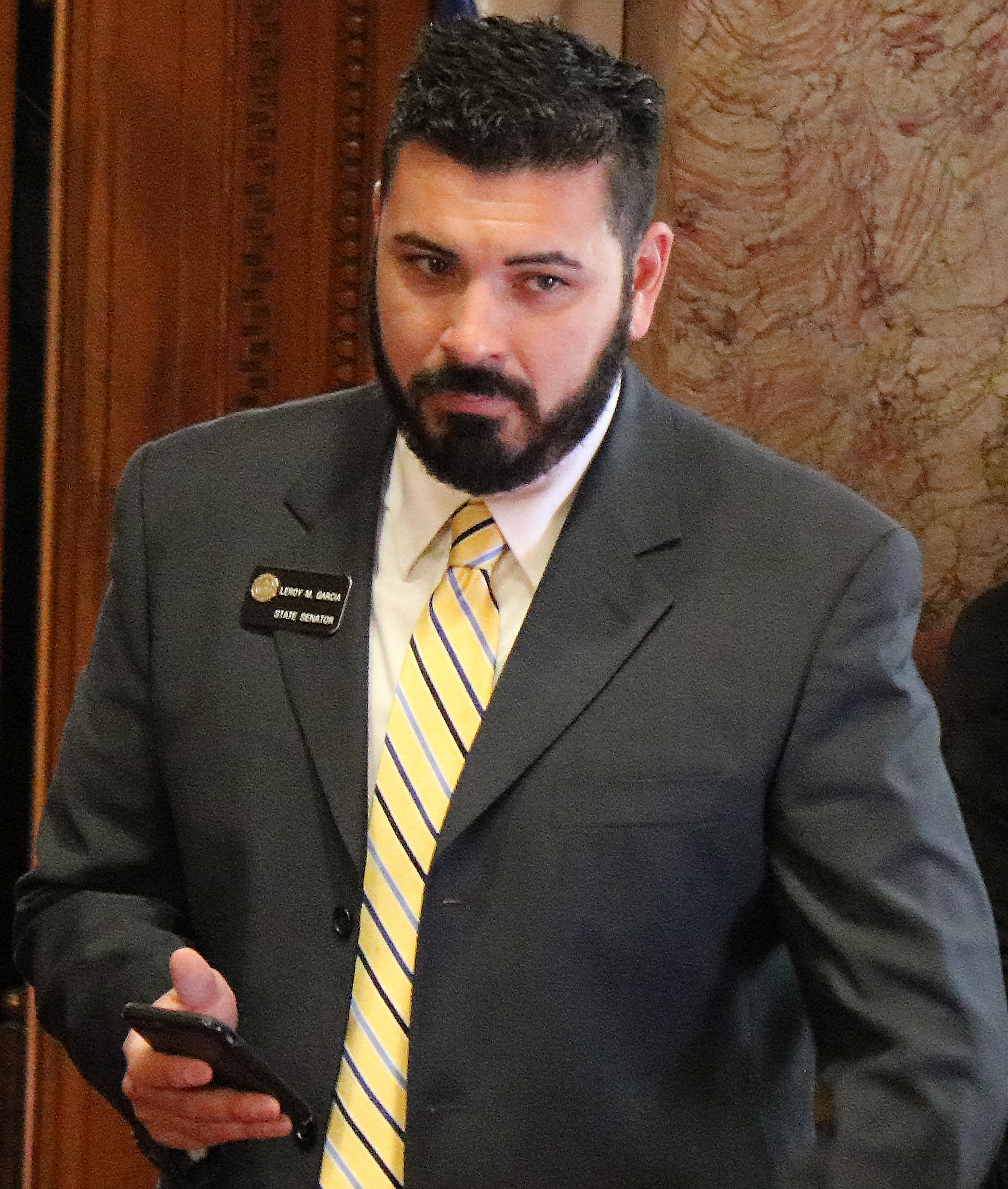
Garcia in 2018

Garcia served on the Appropriations, and Agriculture, Natural Resources and Energy committees during his tenure in the Colorado Senate. He is a member of the Democratic Latino Caucus. He served as acting governor in 2019, while Governor Polis was outside of Colorado due to a meeting of the National Governors Association and Lieutenant Governor Dianne Primavera was in Pennsylvania.

He was selected to serve as the assistant minority leader on November 10, 2016. Senator Lucía Guzmán resigned as Minority Leader, stating that she could not work with the Republican leadership in the state senate on sexual harassment issues, and Garcia was selected to replace her, with Senator Rhonda Fields being the only vote against him, while Guzmán was selected to replace him as assistant minority leader. He was selected to serve as president of the state senate on November 8, 2018, becoming the first Hispanic person to hold the position, and reelected to the position in 2020. Garcia announced on February 3, 2022, that he would resign from the state senate, with his resignation taking effect on February 23, to become special assistant to the Assistant Secretary of the Navy for Manpower and Reserve Affairs. Steve Fenberg was selected to succeed him on February 22.

During the 2020 Democratic presidential primaries, he endorsed Joe Biden. Garcia was appointed to serve on the Latino Leadership Committee for Biden's presidential campaign. In 2021, Garcia was selected to replace Mitzi Johnson, the former Speaker of the Vermont House of Representatives, as the immediate past president of the National Conference of State Legislatures as Johnson had lost reelection in the 2020 election.

Alexander Armijo won $25,000 in a lawsuit against Garcia stating that Garcia had violated his First Amendment rights by blocking him on Facebook. The state paid for the $25,000 and Garcia's legal fees which cost $2,030.

== Political positions ==
Garcia stated that it was "a shameful affront to both the victims who have come forward and those subjected to harassment in workplaces across the country" after an attempt to expel Senator Randy Baumgardner due to sexual harassment allegations failed.

In 2013, the Colorado House of Representatives voted thirty-four to thirty one, with Garcia against, in favor of two pieces of legislation which prohibited high-capacity ammunition magazines from having more than fifteen rounds and which prohibited concealed carry on college campuses. Garcia was one of four Democrats to sponsor legislation to repeal the limit on high-capacity ammunition magazine sizes in 2015. In 2019, the state senate voted eighteen to seventeen, with Garcia as the only Democrat voting against, in favor of red flag legislation.

Garcia and six other Hispanic members of the Colorado General Assembly sent a letter to President Donald Trump asking him to maintain the Deferred Action for Childhood Arrivals policy. Garcia opposed Trump's attempt to add a citizenship question to the 2020 United States census, stating that it would lead to an inaccurate census that would reduce federal funding for Colorado and could prevent the state from gaining a congressional district.

In 2016, the state house voted fifty-five to nine, with Garcia in favor, in favor of legislation that required the Public Employees' Retirement Association to remove investments from foreign companies if they supported boycotts of Israel. The board of directors of the Public Employees' Retirement Association opposed the legislation as they did not want their investment decisions to influenced by politics, and the American Civil Liberties Union opposed it, stating that it was a violation of freedom of speech.

Garcia and Representatives Philip Covarrubias and Daneya Esgar introduced a resolution in 2018, asking for the United States Congress to build hospitals managed by the United States Department of Veterans Affairs in Colorado Springs and Pueblo. He supported the reopening of the Centennial Correctional Facility as it would cost less than building a new prison. He sponsored legislation to create Fishers Peak State Park in 2020.

He received an A rating from NARAL Pro-Choice America. The Disabled American Veterans Department of Colorado named him as the legislator of the year in 2017. He and nine other Democratic members of the state senate received a 100% score from the AFL–CIO in 2018. Garcia was the only Democratic member of the state senate to not receive a 100% rating from Conservation Colorado in 2019.

== Electoral history ==
2012 Colorado House of Representatives 46th district election
Primary election
Party	Candidate	Votes	%
Democratic	Leroy Garcia	7,615	100.00%
Total votes		7,615	100.00%
General election
Democratic	Leroy Garcia	23,892	61.32%
Republican	Jerry Denney	15,069	38.68%
Total votes		38,961	100.00%

2014 Colorado Senate 3rd district election
Primary election
Party	Candidate	Votes	%
Democratic	Leroy Garcia	9,506	100.00%
Total votes		9,506	100.00%
General election
Democratic	Leroy Garcia	27,813	54.94%
Republican	George Rivera	22,814	45.06%
Total votes		50,627	100.00%

2018 Colorado Senate 3rd district election
Primary election
Party	Candidate	Votes	%
Democratic	Leroy Garcia (incumbent)	15,423	100.00%
Total votes		15,423	100.00%
General election
Democratic	Leroy Garcia (incumbent)	39,768	73.62%
Libertarian	John Pickerill	14,253	26.38%
Total votes		54,021	100.00%

Colorado Senate
Preceded by Lucía Guzmán	Minority Leader of the Colorado Senate; 2018–2019	Succeeded by Chris Holbert
Political offices
Preceded by Kevin Grantham	President of the Colorado Senate; 2019–2022	Succeeded by Steve Fenberg
