= Colorado's 1st Senate district =

American legislative district

Colorado's 1st State Senate district
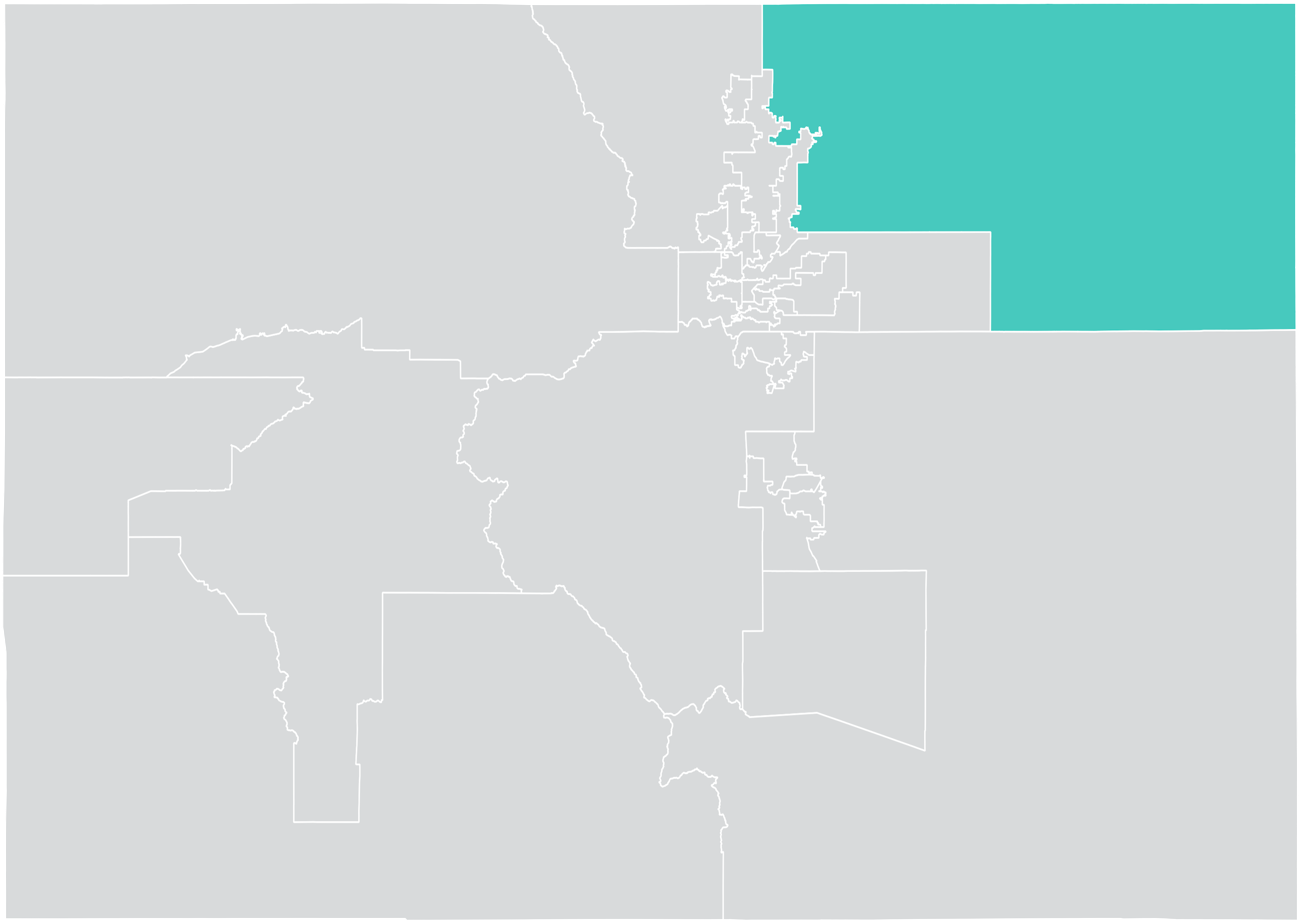
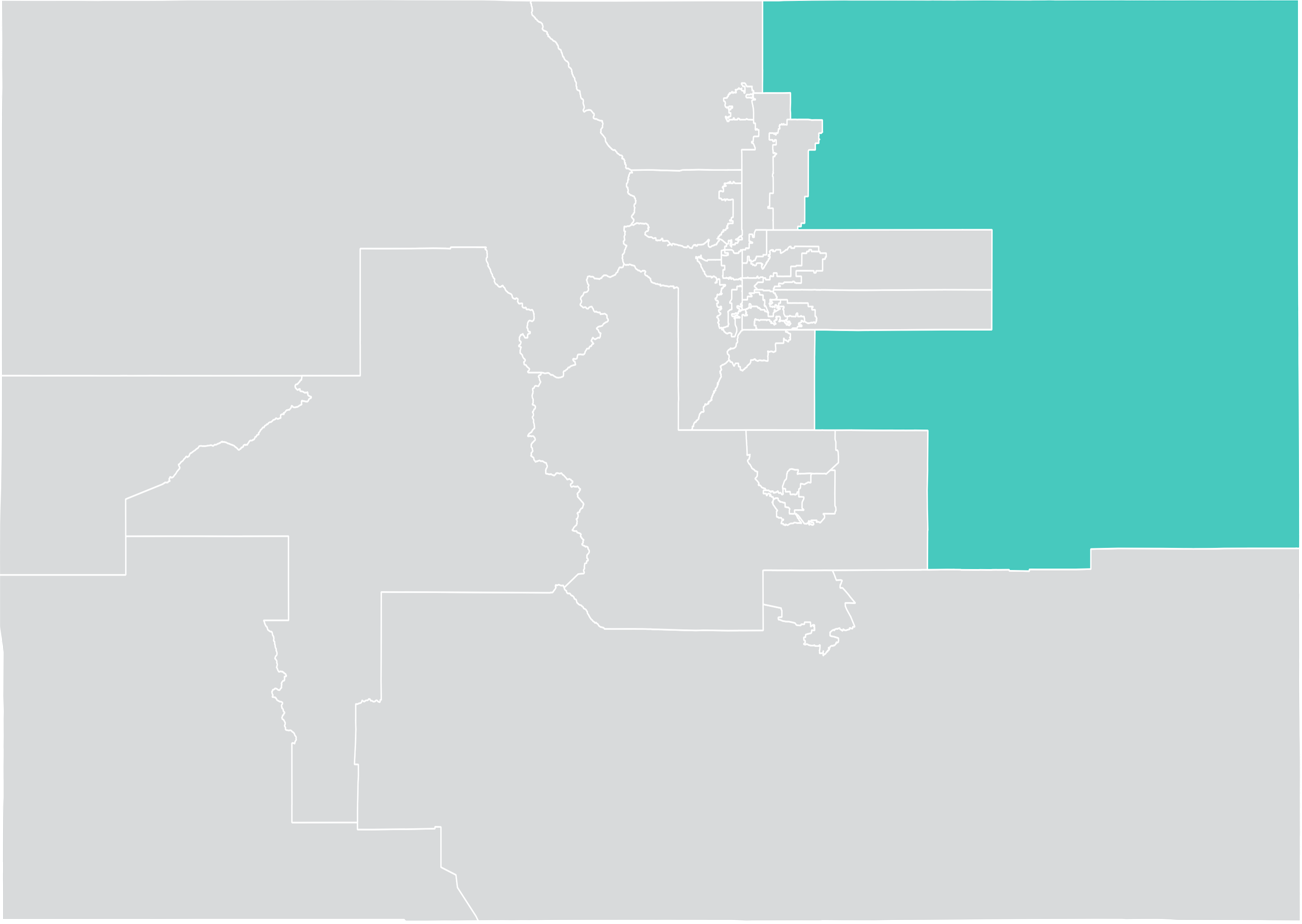
Senator
| Byron Pelton; R–Sterling |
- Registration: 40.8% Republican; 13.4% Democratic; 43.6% No party preference
- Demographics: 74% White; 2% Black; 21% Hispanic; 1% Asian; 2% Other
- Population (2018): 148,526
- Registered voters: 103,238

Colorado's 1st Senate district is one of 35 districts in the Colorado Senate. It has been represented by Republican Byron Pelton since 2023. Prior to redistricting the district was represented by Republicans Jerry Sonnenberg and Greg Brophy.

== Geography ==
District 1 covers much of the Eastern Plains in the state's northeastern corner, including all of Logan, Morgan, Phillips, Sedgwick, Washington, and Yuma Counties and parts of Weld County. Communities in the district include Julesburg, Holyoke, Sterling, Brush, Fort Morgan, Eaton, Kersey, Lochbuie, Hudson, Keenesburg, Ault, Akron, Wray, Yuma, Burlington.

The district is located entirely in Colorado's 4th and 8th congressional districts, and overlaps with the 48th, 63rd, 64th, and 65th districts of the Colorado House of Representatives. It borders the states of Wyoming, Nebraska, and Kansas.

== Recent election results ==
=== 2022 ===
Colorado state senators are elected to staggered four-year terms; under normal circumstances, the 1st district holds elections in midterm years. The 2022 election is the first held under the state's new district lines.

2022 Colorado Senate election, District 1
| Party | Candidate | Votes | % |
|---|---|---|---|
| Republican | Byron Pelton | 53,199 | 100 |
| Total votes | | 53,199 | 100 |

== Historical election results ==
=== 2018 ===
2018 Colorado Senate election, District 1
| Party | Candidate | Votes | % |
|---|---|---|---|
| Republican | Jerry Sonnenberg (incumbent) | 52,311 | 79.0 |
| Democratic | Debra Gustafson | 13,894 | 21.0 |
| Total votes | | 66,205 | 100 |
| Republican hold | | | |

=== 2014 ===
2014 Colorado Senate election, District 1
| Party | Candidate | Votes | % |
|---|---|---|---|
| Republican | Jerry Sonnenberg | 45,689 | 85.3 |
| Constitution | Doug Aden | 7,876 | 14.7 |
| Total votes | | 53,565 | 100 |
| Republican hold | | | |

=== Federal and statewide results ===
| Year | Office | Results |
|---|---|---|
| 2020 | President | Trump 75.3 – 22.5% |
| 2018 | Governor | Stapleton 74.1 – 21.8% |
| 2016 | President | Trump 74.0 – 19.7% |
| 2014 | Senate | Gardner 74.6 – 19.5% |
| 2014 | Governor | Beauprez 71.8 – 23.8% |
| 2012 | President | Romney 69.7 – 27.9% |

== Past senators ==
| Senator | Party | Years of service |
|---|---|---|
| Greg Brophy | Republican Party | June 23, 2005 – January 7, 2015 |
| Jerry Sonnenberg | Republican Party | January 7, 2015 – January 9, 2023 |
