= Robert Rodriguez (politician) =

American politician

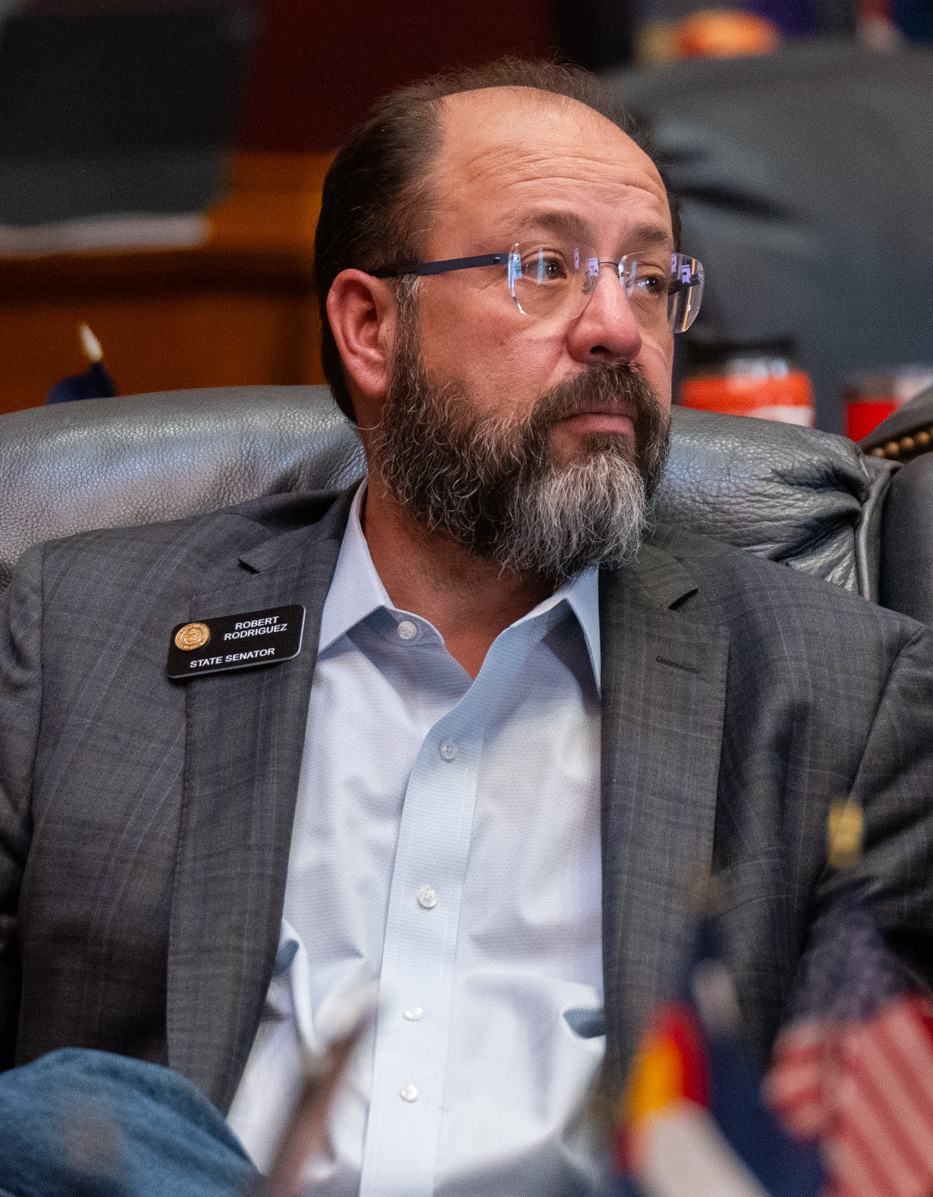
- Rodriguez in 2023

Majority Leader of the Colorado Senate
- Incumbent
- Assumed office September 8, 2023
- Preceded by: Dominick Moreno

Member of the Colorado Senate from the 32nd district
- Incumbent
- Assumed office January 4, 2019
- Preceded by: Irene Aguilar

Personal details
- Born: New Mexico, U.S.
- Party: Democratic

Robert Rodriguez is an American politician from the state of Colorado. A Democrat, Rodriguez was first elected to represent Colorado's 32nd Senate district of the in 2018. He was reelected in the 2022 Colorado Senate election.

== Career ==
Rodriguez currently serves as a member of the Executive Committee of the Legislative Council, the Legislative Council committee, and Joint Technology Committee. On September 8, 2023, Rodriguez's colleagues elected him senate majority leader following Dominick Moreno's resignation from the senate.

During the 2024 legislative session, Rodriguez prime sponsored the Colorado AI Act, described as the country's first legislative framework to govern high-risk AI systems.

== Electoral history ==
In the 2018 Colorado Senate election, Rodriguez was elected to represent Colorado's 32nd Senate district, which covers southern and southwestern Denver. Rodriguez was reelected in the 2022 Colorado Senate election.

Colorado Senate
Preceded by Dominick Moreno	Majority Leader of the Colorado Senate; 2023–present	Incumbent
