= Holyoke, Colorado =

City in Colorado, United States

- Home rule municipality
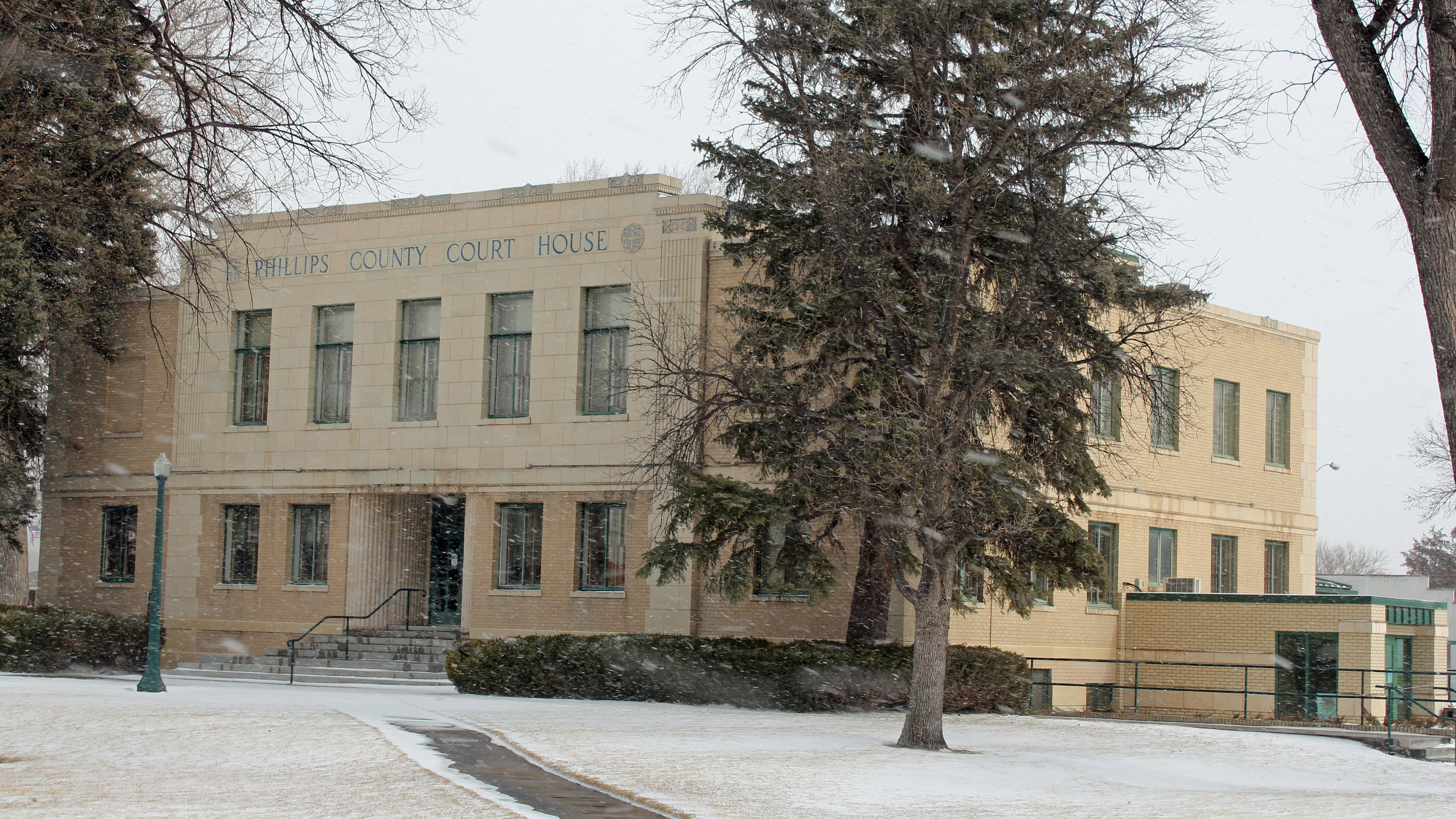
- Phillips County Courthouse (2013)

- Location within Phillips County and Colorado
- Coordinates: 40°34′55″N 102°17′51″W
- Country: United States
- State: Colorado
- County: Phillips
- Incorporated: May 31, 1888

Area
  - Total: 2.476 sq mi (6.414 km^{2})
  - Land: 2.470 sq mi (6.396 km^{2})
  - Water: 0.0069 sq mi (0.018 km^{2})
- Elevation: 3,734 ft (1,138 m)

Population (2020)
  - Total: 2,346
  - Density: 950.0/sq mi (366.8/km^{2})
- Time zone: UTC−7 (MST)
  - Summer (DST): UTC−6 (MDT)
- ZIP Code: 80734
- Area code: 970
- FIPS code: 08-37270
- GNIS ID: 2410781
- Website: City website

Holyoke is the home rule municipality that is the county seat of and the most populous municipality in Phillips County, Colorado, United States. As of the 2020 United States census, its population was 2,346.

== History ==
The county seat of Phillips County, Colorado (1887, 3,746 feet (1.14 km)) was named by the general superintendent of the Burlington Railroad for his son-in-law, Edward A. Holyoke. This division point on Frenchman Creek was laid out on a grid. Grain elevators are the skyscrapers in Holyoke, which is still focused on its main street, Interocean Avenue (U.S. 385). The Burge Hotel (1912), 230 North Interocean Avenue, has a huge stone fireplace and tablet honoring the “Knights of the Grip,” the traveling salesmen who spiced small-town life. A main street mansion converted to a nursing home has a large sign: “Love is Ageless. Visit Us.”

== Geography ==
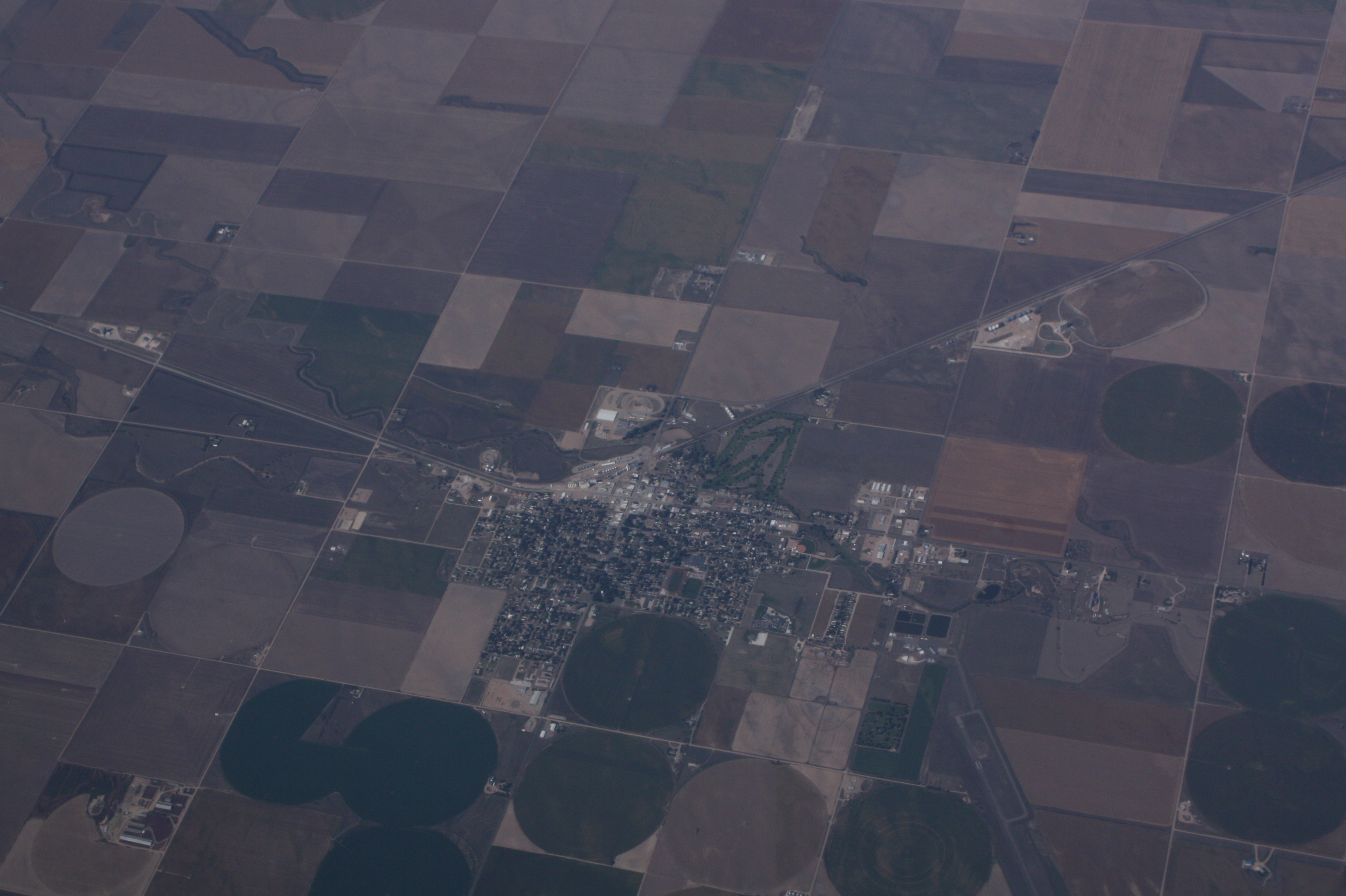
Oblique air photo from September 2018

At the 2020 United States census, the town had a total area of 1,585 acres (6.414 km^{2}) including 4.4 acres (0.018 km^{2}) of water.

=== Climate ===
According to the Köppen Climate Classification system, Holyoke has a cold semi-arid climate, abbreviated "BSk" on climate maps.

Climate data for Holyoke, Colorado, 1991–2020 normals, extremes 1897–present
Month	Jan	Feb	Mar	Apr	May	Jun	Jul	Aug	Sep	Oct	Nov	Dec	Year
Record high °F (°C)	76 (24)	80 (27)	89 (32)	91 (33)	99 (37)	110 (43)	110 (43)	107 (42)	105 (41)	98 (37)	88 (31)	80 (27)	110 (43)
Mean maximum °F (°C)	64.0 (17.8)	68.0 (20.0)	77.6 (25.3)	84.0 (28.9)	90.7 (32.6)	97.5 (36.4)	100.3 (37.9)	98.1 (36.7)	94.6 (34.8)	86.9 (30.5)	75.4 (24.1)	64.9 (18.3)	101.8 (38.8)
Mean daily maximum °F (°C)	41.6 (5.3)	44.2 (6.8)	54.1 (12.3)	61.8 (16.6)	70.9 (21.6)	82.5 (28.1)	88.0 (31.1)	86.2 (30.1)	78.6 (25.9)	65.2 (18.4)	52.5 (11.4)	42.3 (5.7)	64.0 (17.8)
Daily mean °F (°C)	27.2 (−2.7)	29.4 (−1.4)	38.4 (3.6)	46.4 (8.0)	56.7 (13.7)	67.8 (19.9)	73.3 (22.9)	71.1 (21.7)	62.6 (17.0)	49.0 (9.4)	37.0 (2.8)	27.6 (−2.4)	48.9 (9.4)
Mean daily minimum °F (°C)	12.7 (−10.7)	14.5 (−9.7)	22.7 (−5.2)	31.1 (−0.5)	42.5 (5.8)	53.1 (11.7)	58.6 (14.8)	56.0 (13.3)	46.6 (8.1)	32.9 (0.5)	21.4 (−5.9)	13.0 (−10.6)	33.8 (1.0)
Mean minimum °F (°C)	−6.2 (−21.2)	−3.1 (−19.5)	6.8 (−14.0)	19.0 (−7.2)	29.1 (−1.6)	43.6 (6.4)	51.9 (11.1)	48.0 (8.9)	34.4 (1.3)	18.1 (−7.7)	6.5 (−14.2)	−4.3 (−20.2)	−13.0 (−25.0)
Record low °F (°C)	−27 (−33)	−36 (−38)	−23 (−31)	−4 (−20)	8 (−13)	30 (−1)	37 (3)	36 (2)	16 (−9)	−12 (−24)	−12 (−24)	−35 (−37)	−36 (−38)
Average precipitation inches (mm)	0.32 (8.1)	0.51 (13)	0.86 (22)	1.92 (49)	2.83 (72)	2.76 (70)	2.75 (70)	2.39 (61)	1.40 (36)	1.23 (31)	0.52 (13)	0.44 (11)	17.93 (456.1)
Average snowfall inches (cm)	4.5 (11)	6.1 (15)	4.4 (11)	3.7 (9.4)	0.2 (0.51)	0.0 (0.0)	0.0 (0.0)	0.0 (0.0)	0.2 (0.51)	1.9 (4.8)	3.9 (9.9)	5.5 (14)	30.4 (76.12)
Average precipitation days (≥ 0.01 in)	3.1	5.0	5.5	8.5	10.6	9.3	9.4	7.9	5.9	5.8	3.8	3.6	78.4
Average snowy days (≥ 0.1 in)	2.7	4.0	2.9	1.8	0.2	0.0	0.0	0.0	0.1	1.0	2.3	3.3	18.3
Source 1: NOAA
Source 2: National Weather Service

== Demographics ==
Historical population
Census	Pop.	Note	%±
1890	649		—
1900	451		−30.5%
1910	659		46.1%
1920	1,205		82.9%
1930	1,226		1.7%
1940	1,150		−6.2%
1950	1,558		35.5%
1960	1,555		−0.2%
1970	1,640		5.5%
1980	2,092		27.6%
1990	1,931		−7.7%
2000	2,261		17.1%
2010	2,313		2.3%
2020	2,346		1.4%
U.S. Decennial Census

As of the census of 2000, there were 2,261 people, 896 households, and 594 families residing in the city. The population density was 1,300.3 inhabitants per square mile (502.0/km^{2}). There were 980 housing units at an average density of 563.6 units per square mile (217.6 units/km^{2}). The racial makeup of the city was 89.61% White, 0.04% African American, 0.31% Native American, 0.57% Asian, 8.09% from other races, and 1.37% from two or more races. Hispanic or Latino of any race were 20.39% of the population.

There were 896 households, out of which 34.4% had children under the age of 18 living with them, 57.9% were married couples living together, 6.3% had a female householder with no husband present, and 33.7% were non-families. 30.6% of all households were made up of individuals, and 16.0% had someone living alone who was 65 years of age or older. The average household size was 2.47 and the average family size was 3.11.

In the city, the population was spread out, with 28.3% under the age of 18, 6.4% from 18 to 24, 26.6% from 25 to 44, 20.1% from 45 to 64, and 18.7% who were 65 years of age or older. The median age was 38 years. For every 100 females, there were 90.2 males. For every 100 females age 18 and over, there were 86.7 males.

The median income for a household in the city was $30,984, and the median income for a family was $36,970. Males had a median income of $30,500 versus $17,455 for females. The per capita income for the city was $15,697. About 12.0% of families and 14.6% of the population were below the poverty line, including 21.1% of those under age 18 and 8.4% of those age 65 or over.

== Notable people ==
- Greg Brophy (b. 1966), former state senator
- Bill Brundige (1948–2018), American football defensive end
- Mike Groene (b. 1955), politician
- Dorothy Horrell (b. 1951), Chancellor of University of Colorado Denver
- Charles B. Timberlake (1854–1941), U.S. Congressman from Colorado

== See also ==
- Patricia (Pat) Hepinstall, one of the first women to fly to Antarctica
- W. E. Heginbotham House
