= Diane Hoppe =

American politician

Member of the Colorado House of Representatives from the 65th district
- In office 1999 – January 10, 2007
- Preceded by: Don Ament
- Succeeded by: Jerry Sonnenberg

Personal details
- Born: December 14, 1947 Sterling, Colorado
- Died: February 27, 2016 (aged 68) Broomfield, Colorado
- Party: Republican

Diane Hoppe (December 14, 1947 – February 27, 2016) was an American politician who served in the Colorado House of Representatives from the 65th district from 1999 to 2007.

She died of cancer on February 27, 2016, in Broomfield, Colorado at age 68.
