= Colorado's 3rd Senate district =

American legislative district

Colorado's 3rd State Senate district
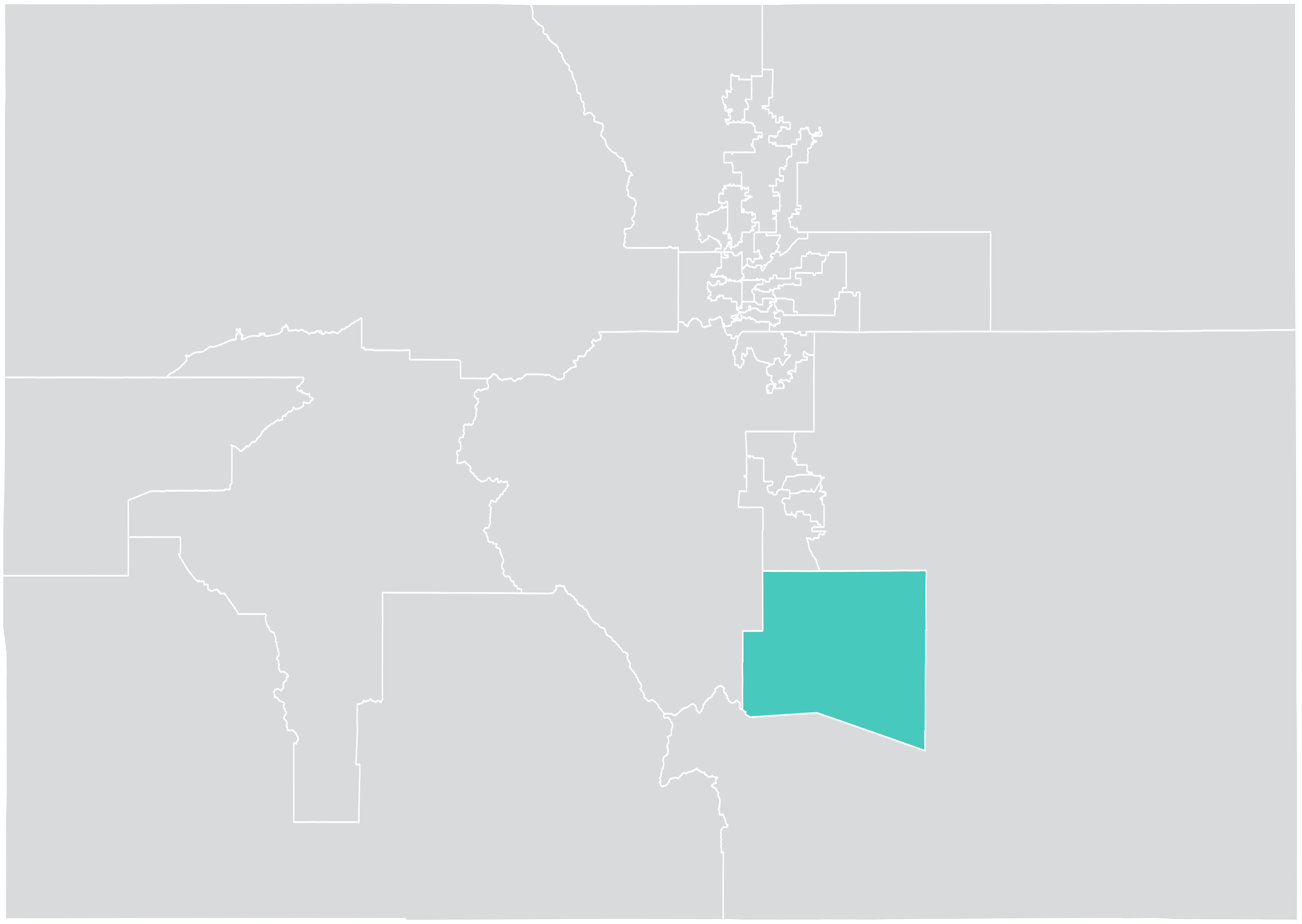
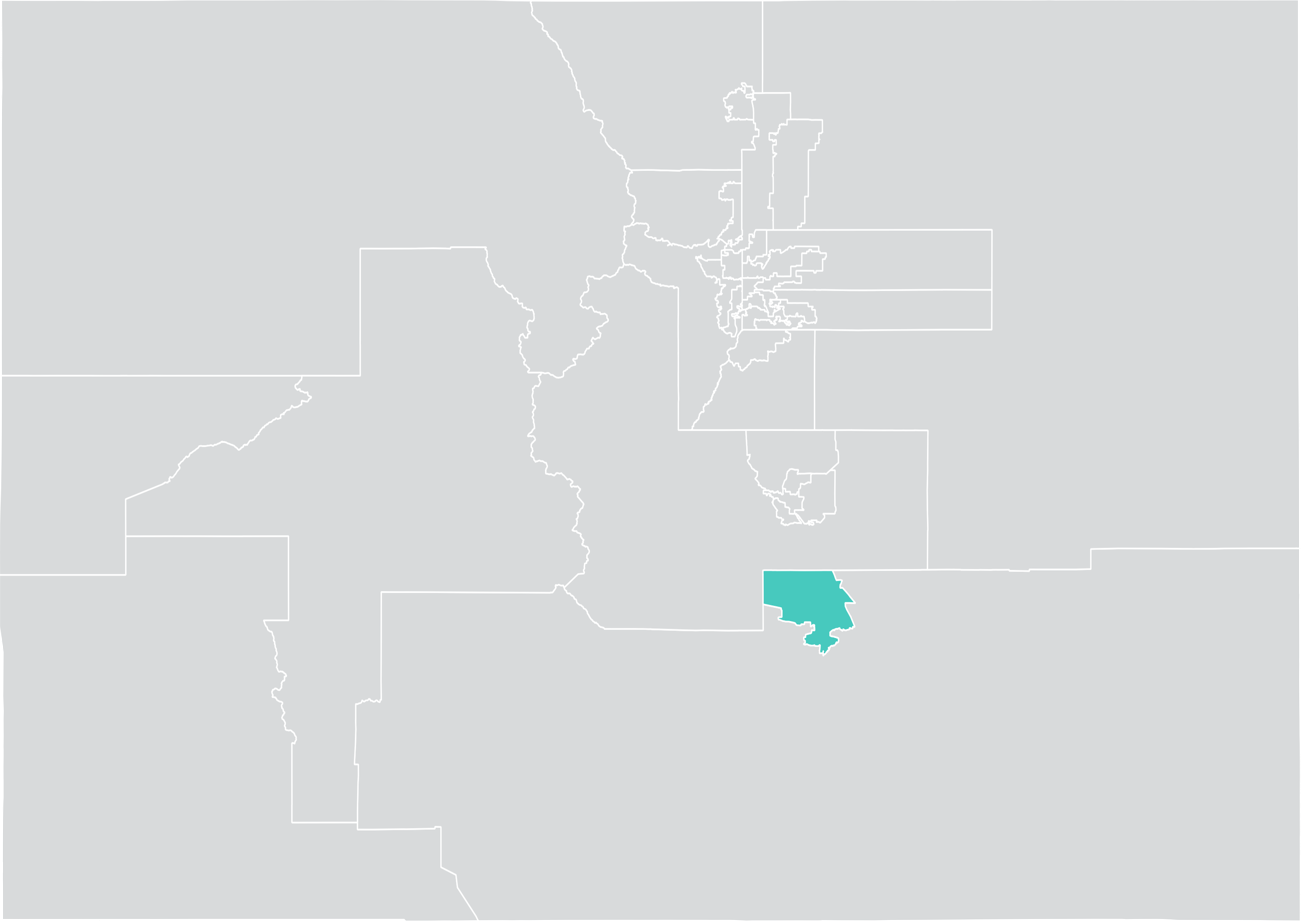
Senator
Nick Hinrichsen; D–Pueblo
- Registration: 30.3% Democratic; 23.3% Republican; 43.9% No party preference
- Demographics: 49% White; 2% Black; 45% Hispanic; 1% Asian; 1% Native American; 2% Other
- Population (2018): 145,789
- Registered voters: 100,093

Colorado's 3rd Senate district is one of 35 districts in the Colorado Senate. It has been represented by Democrat Nick Hinrichsen since 2022, following the resignation of Leroy Garcia.

== List of state senators ==
- Leroy Garcia
- Nick Hinrichsen
- Aaron Gutierrez

== Geography ==
District 3 is based in the city of Pueblo in Pueblo County, also covering the nearby community of Pueblo West.

The district is located entirely within Colorado's 3rd congressional district, and overlaps with the 46th, 47th, and 62nd districts of the Colorado House of Representatives.

== Recent election results ==
=== 2022 ===
Colorado state senators are elected to staggered four-year terms; under normal circumstances, the 3rd district holds elections in midterm years. The 2022 election will be the first one held under the state's new district lines.

2022 Colorado State Senate election, District 3
Party	Candidate	Votes	%
Democratic	Nick Hinrichsen (incumbent)	33,795	51.2
Republican	Stephen Varela	32,090	48.6
Write-in		90	0.1
Total votes		65,975	100
Democratic hold			

== Historical election results ==
=== 2018 ===
2018 Colorado State Senate election, District 3
Party	Candidate	Votes	%
Democratic	Leroy Garcia (incumbent)	39,768	73.6
Libertarian	John Pickerill	14,253	26.4
Total votes		54,021	100
Democratic hold			

=== 2014 ===
2014 Colorado State Senate election, District 3
Party	Candidate	Votes	%
Democratic	Leroy Garcia	27,813	54.9
Republican	George Rivera (incumbent)	22,814	45.1
Total votes		50,627	100
Democratic gain from Republican			

=== 2013 recall ===
In 2013, an attempt to recall incumbent Democrat Angela Giron over her support for gun control legislation was successful, resulting in the election of Republican George Rivera.

Shall Angela Giron be recalled from the office of State Senate, District 3?
Choice	Votes	%
For	19,451	55.85
Against	15,376	44.15
Total	34,827	100.00

2013 Colorado State Senate recall election, District 3
Party	Candidate	Votes	%
Republican	George Rivera	19,301	88.2
Write-in		2,592	11.8
Total votes		21,893	100
Republican gain from Democratic			

=== Federal and statewide results ===
Year	Office	Results
2020	President	Biden 52.0 – 45.4%
2018	Governor	Polis 53.1 – 41.9%
2016	President	Clinton 48.0 – 43.6%
2014	Senate	Udall 48.9 – 44.0%
2014	Governor	Hickenlooper 52.0 – 42.5%
2012	President	Obama 58.3 – 39.4%
