= Byron Pelton =

American politician

Byron H. Pelton
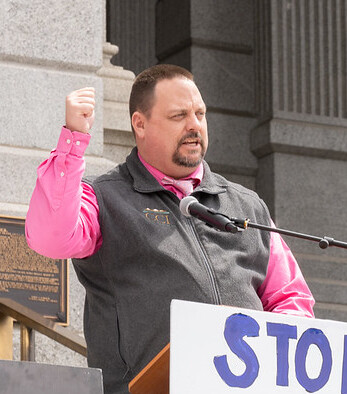
- Pelton in 2025

Member of the Colorado Senate from the 1st district
- Incumbent
- Assumed office January 9, 2023
- Preceded by: Jerry Sonnenberg

Personal details
- Party: Republican
- Spouse: Celeste
- Children: 2
- Profession: Electrician; Cattle producer
- Website: www.byronpelton.com

Byron H. Pelton is a state senator from Sterling, Colorado. A Republican, Pelton represents Colorado's 1st Senate district, which includes all or part of Logan, Morgan, Phillips, Sedgwick, Washington, Weld, and Yuma, counties in northeast Colorado, including all or parts of the communities of Greeley, Sterling, Fort Morgan, Lochbuie, and Severance.

== Background ==
Pelton, his wife Celeste, and their two daughters live in Sterling, Colorado where they run a small cow-calf operation. Originally from Cheyenne Wells, Colorado, Pelton is a United States Navy veteran. In the Navy, he was trained as an electrician repairing ships damaged in Desert Storm. This service led to his first career as a Master Electrician. Upon being honorably discharged from the Navy, he moved to northeast Colorado and worked as an electrician for 20 years.

Pelton was elected Logan County commissioner in 2016 and was re-elected in 2020. He has served on several task forces and boards, such as the Governor's Behavioral Health Taskforce. He has also served on the board of directors of Colorado Counties, Inc., and was named "Colorado Commissioner of the Year" in 2021.

== Legislative career ==
=== 74th General Assembly ===
At the start of the 74th General Assembly in 2023, Pelton was appointed to serve on the Senate Committee on Transportation and Energy, the Senate Committee on Agriculture and Natural Resources, and the Senate Committee on Local Government and Housing.

During the 2024 legislative session, Pelton prime sponsored a bill to increase the minimum mandatory sentences for those convicted of human trafficking in Colorado.

=== 75th General Assembly ===
At the start of the 2025 legislative session, Pelton was appointed to serve on the Senate Agriculture & Natural Resources committee, the Legislative Council, the Appropriations committee, the Senate State, Veterans, & Military Affairs committee, the Capital Development Committee, and the Senate Transportation & Energy committee.

During the 2025 legislative session, Pelton ran a bill that would have increased penalties for those convicted of manufacturing, selling or distributing fentanyl in Colorado; the bill was defeated in committee.

== Electoral history ==
In the 2022 Colorado Senate election, Pelton ran unopposed, winning 100.00% of the total votes cast.

2022 Colorado Senate election, District 1
Party	Candidate	Votes	%
Republican	Byron Pelton	53,199	100
Total votes		53,199	100
Republican hold			
