= Angela Giron =

American politician and nonprofit executive

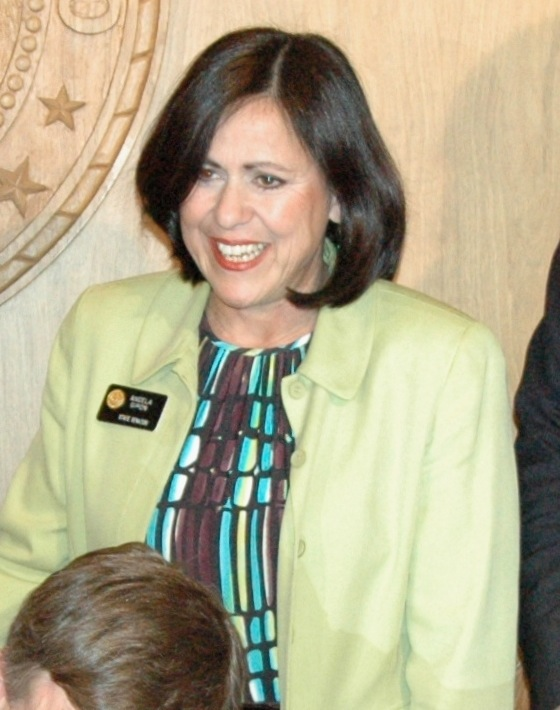
- Giron in 2011

Member of the Pueblo County Board of County Commissioners from District 3
- Incumbent
- Assumed office January 2027
- Preceded by: Zach Swearingen

Member of the Colorado Senate from the 3rd district
- In office August 4, 2010 – September 10, 2013
- Preceded by: Abel Tapia
- Succeeded by: George Rivera

Personal details
- Born: May 12, 1960 (age 66)
- Party: Democratic
- Spouse: Steve Nawrocki
- Education: Colorado State University Pueblo

Angela Giron (born May 12, 1960) is an American public official, nonprofit executive, and community leader from Pueblo, Colorado. A member of the Democratic Party, she previously served in the Colorado Senate representing District 3 from 2010 to 2013 and was elected to the Pueblo County Board of County Commissioners for District 3 in November 2026.

== Early career ==
Prior to elected office, Giron built a career in public service and nonprofit leadership. She worked as a congressional aide to U.S. Senators Ken Salazar and Michael Bennet, focusing on constituent services and regional outreach in southern Colorado.

Giron later joined the Boys & Girls Clubs of Pueblo County, where she advanced into executive leadership. In that role, she helped oversee youth programming, organizational growth, and expanded access to after-school services for children and families in the Pueblo area.

== Colorado Senate tenure ==
Giron was elected to the Colorado Senate in 2010, representing District 3, which includes Pueblo. During her time in office, she supported legislation related to education, economic development, and public safety.

In 2013, she voted in favor of a package of firearm-related legislation, including expanded background checks, following statewide debates on gun violence. Giron stated that her votes were intended to address public safety concerns and reflected her perspective on the needs of her constituents.

== 2013 recall ==
In 2013, Giron became one of the first sitting legislators in Colorado to face a recall election. The effort was largely driven by opposition to her support of gun legislation passed earlier that year.

The recall drew national attention as one of only a small number of such elections in the state's history. During the campaign, Giron emphasized voter participation and expressed concerns about election processes and access.

The recall election was held on September 10, 2013, and resulted in her removal from office.

Subsequent media analysis noted that at least one widely reported ethics complaint during the recall effort had not been formally accepted for review, highlighting the contentious nature of the campaign environment.

== Legislative work ==
During her tenure in the Colorado Senate, Giron supported legislation and budget priorities focused on public safety, education, and economic stability for working families.

She was a supporter of firearm-related legislation passed in 2013, including expanded background checks. Giron stated that her support for these measures was based on concerns about public safety and community well-being in the aftermath of mass shootings in Colorado.

Giron also supported capital construction funding for higher education infrastructure in southern Colorado. This included state funding for the General Classroom Building at Colorado State University Pueblo, a project intended to expand academic capacity and modernize learning environments for students in the region.

In addition, Giron supported legislation to modernize and expand access to voting in Colorado. These efforts included measures to increase voter participation through mail-in voting systems, same-day voter registration, and expanded access to early voting. Supporters of the legislation characterized these changes as improving accessibility and civic participation across the state.

In addition to public safety and election policy, Giron's work in the Senate included advocacy for children, families, and underserved communities, reflecting her background in youth development and nonprofit leadership.

== Electoral history ==
Giron was elected to the Colorado State Senate in 2010, representing District 3, which includes Pueblo, Colorado. She was re-elected in 2012.

In 2013, Giron faced a recall election, one of the first such elections involving a sitting state legislator in Colorado. The recall was held on September 10, 2013, and resulted in her removal from office.

In 2026, Giron announced her candidacy for the Pueblo County Board of County Commissioners, running for the District 3 seat. She won the Democratic primary unopposed. In the November 3, 2026, general election, Giron ran against Republican incumbent and board chair Zach Swearingen, winning the seat.

== Subsequent career ==
Following her tenure in the Colorado Senate, Giron returned to nonprofit leadership with the Boys & Girls Clubs of Pueblo County, where she has served in an executive leadership role focused on organizational growth and youth development.

During her leadership, the organization expanded its physical presence beyond the city of Pueblo, including the establishment of additional program sites in Pueblo West and Avondale. These expansions increased access to after-school programming and youth services for families in underserved and outlying areas of Pueblo County.

Giron has also been associated with significant organizational growth, including an increase in the nonprofit's operating budget from approximately $1 million to more than $5 million. This growth supported expanded programming, staffing, and community partnerships aimed at improving outcomes for children and families.

Her work has emphasized increasing access to mentorship, educational support, and safe environments for youth, particularly in communities with limited resources.

In 2026, Giron announced her candidacy for Pueblo County Commissioner District 3, citing continued interest in public service and local economic and community development priorities.

== Personal life ==
Giron resides in Pueblo, Colorado, with her husband, Steve Nawrocki, a former member of the Pueblo City Council. She has one daughter.

In addition to her professional work, Giron has participated in community events and youth-focused initiatives, including speaking engagements centered on leadership and civic engagement.
