= Colorado's 32nd Senate district =

American legislative district

Colorado's 32nd State Senate district
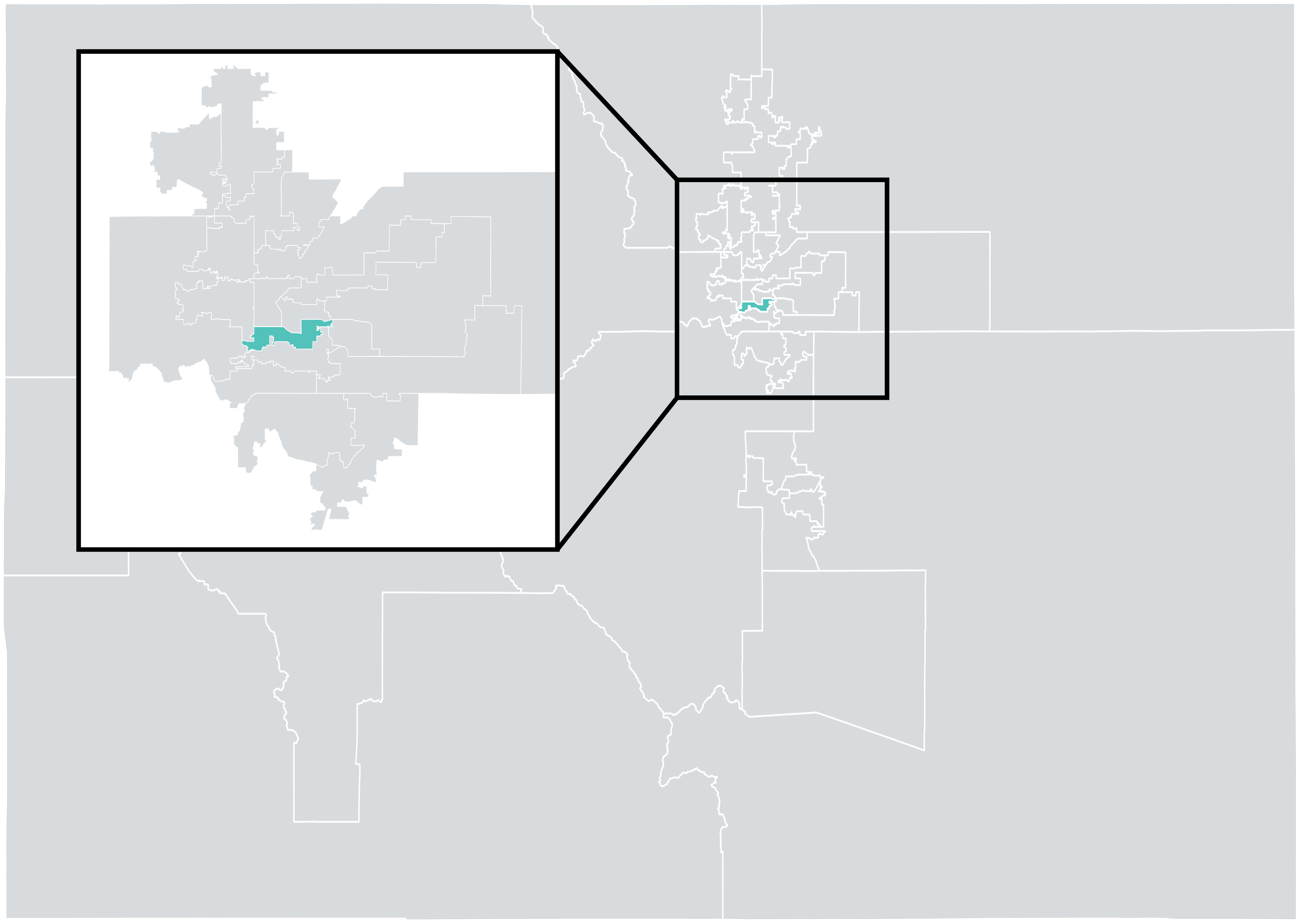
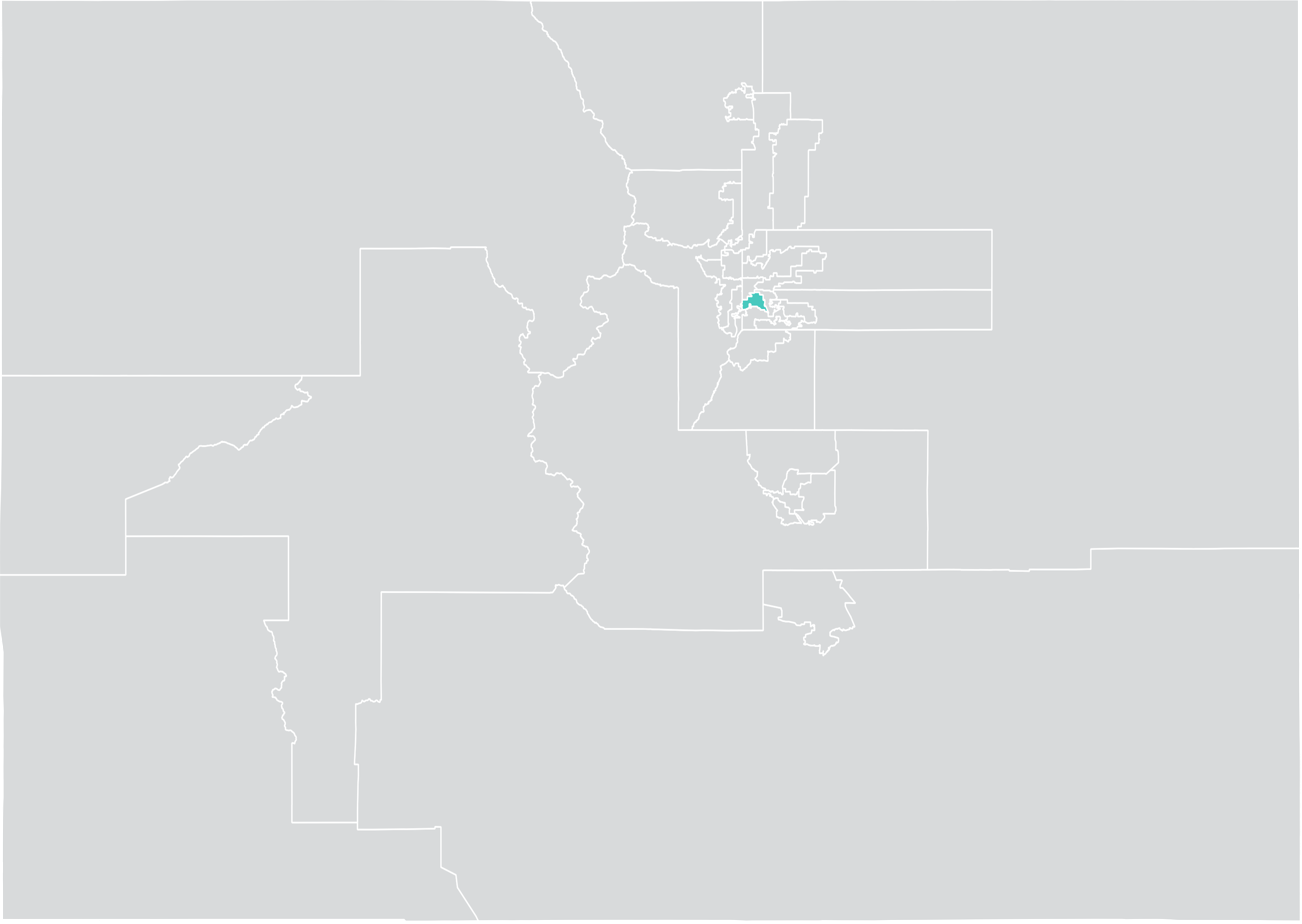
Senator
Robert Rodriguez; D–Denver
- Registration: 38.5% Democratic; 11.4% Republican; 47.5% No party preference
- Demographics: 58% White; 3% Black; 32% Hispanic; 5% Asian; 2% Other
- Population (2018): 164,301
- Registered voters: 115,372

Colorado's 32nd Senate district is one of 35 districts in the Colorado Senate. It has been represented by Democrat Robert Rodriguez since 2019, succeeding fellow Democrat Irene Aguilar.

== Geography ==
District 32 covers southern and southwestern Denver.

The district is located entirely within Colorado's 1st congressional district, and overlaps with the 1st, 2nd, 5th, 6th, and 9th districts of the Colorado House of Representatives.

== Recent election results ==
Colorado state senators are elected to staggered four-year terms; under normal circumstances, the 32nd district holds elections in midterm years. The 2022 election will be the first held under the state's new district lines.

=== 2022 ===
2022 Colorado State Senate election, District 32
Party	Candidate	Votes	%
Democratic	Robert Rodriguez (incumbent)	44,619	76.0
Republican	Dean Flanders	14,089	24.0
Total votes		58,708	100

== Historical election results ==
=== 2018 ===
2018 Colorado State Senate election, District 32
Primary election
Party	Candidate	Votes	%
Democratic	Robert Rodriguez	10,636	39.8
Democratic	Zach Neumann	8,616	32.3
Democratic	Hazel Gibson	7,458	27.9
Total votes		26,710	100
General election
Democratic	Robert Rodriguez	53,307	72.0
Republican	Mark Calonder	17,294	23.4
Independent	Peter Smith	3,446	4.7
Total votes		74,047	100
Democratic hold			

=== 2014 ===
2014 Colorado State Senate election, District 32
Party	Candidate	Votes	%
Democratic	Irene Aguilar (incumbent)	35,852	64.3
Republican	Dawne Murray	17,356	31.1
Libertarian	Darrell Dinges	2,560	4.6
Total votes		55,768	100
Democratic hold			

=== 2012 ===
Following the resignation of Chris Romer in 2011, appointed incumbent Irene Aguilar ran in an off-cycle election to represent the remainder of his term.

2012 Colorado State Senate election, District 32
Party	Candidate	Votes	%
Democratic	Irene Aguilar (incumbent)	47,995	70.1
Republican	Roger Logan	20,505	29.9
Total votes		68,500	100
Democratic hold			

=== Federal and statewide results ===
Year	Office	Results
2020	President	Biden 77.0 – 20.5%
2018	Governor	Polis 74.0 – 22.8%
2016	President	Clinton 70.3 – 21.7%
2014	Senate	Udall 66.4 – 28.8%
2014	Governor	Hickenlooper 70.7 – 25.1%
2012	President	Obama 69.0 – 28.7%
