= Colorado Senate =

Upper house of Colorado General Assembly

Coordinates: 39.7392°N 104.9848°W

Colorado State Senate
- 75th Colorado General Assembly

Type
- Type: Upper house
- Term limits: 2 consecutive terms (8 years)

History
- New session started: January 8, 2025

Leadership
- President: James Coleman (D) since January 8, 2025
- President pro tempore: Cathy Kipp (D) since February 23, 2026
- Majority Leader: Robert Rodriguez (D) since September 8, 2023
- Minority Leader: Cleave Simpson (R) since June 12, 2025

Structure
- Seats: 35
- Political groups: Majority: Democratic (23); Minority: Republican (12)
- Length of term: 4 years
- Authority: Article V, Colorado Constitution
- Salary: $43,977/year + per diem

Elections
- Voting system: First-past-the-post
- Last election: November 5, 2024 (17 seats)
- Next election: November 3, 2026 (18 seats)
- Redistricting: Colorado Independent Legislative Redistricting Commission

Meeting place
- State Senate Chamber; Colorado State Capitol, Denver

Website
- Colorado General Assembly

Rules
- Colorado Legislative Rules

The Colorado State Senate is the upper house of the Colorado General Assembly, the state legislature of the US state of Colorado. It is composed of 35 members elected from single-member districts, with each district having a population of about 123,000 as of the 2000 census. Senators are elected to four-year terms, and are limited to two consecutive terms in office. Senators who are term-limited become eligible to run again after a one-term (four year) respite.

The Colorado Senate convenes at the State Capitol in Denver.

== History ==
The first meeting of the Colorado General Assembly took place from November 1, 1876, through March 20, 1877. Lafayette Head was the first state senate president.

In 1885, the Colorado Senate appointed its first chaplain, Methodist circuit riding missionary, Father John Lewis Dyer.

The lieutenant governor served as Senate President until 1974 when Article V, Section 10 of the state constitution was amended, granting the Colorado Senate the right to elect one of its own members as president. Fred Anderson was the first state senate president elected after the amendment. Ruth Stockton was the first woman to become Senate's president pro tempore, serving from 1979 to 1980.

== Terms and qualifications ==
The Colorado Senate has 35 members elected to staggered four-year terms. Half the chamber is elected in the same year as gubernatorial elections, with the other half elected in the same year as presidential elections.

State senators are term-limited to two consecutive terms, equivalent to eight years. Term-limited former members can run again after a four-year break. Vacancies in legislative offices are generally filled by political party vacancy committees, rather than special elections. Vacancy appointees who fill the first half of a state senator's term must stand for election at the next even year November election for the remainder of the state senate term for the seat to which the state senator was appointed.

== Procedure and powers ==
With the notable exceptions listed below, the Colorado Senate operates in a manner quite similar to the United States Senate.

Regular sessions are held annually and begin no later than the second Wednesday in January. Regular sessions last no more than 120 days. Special sessions may be called at any time by the governor of Colorado or upon written request of two-thirds of the members of each house, but are infrequent. Some committees of the General Assembly work between sessions and have limited power to take action without General Assembly approval between legislative sessions.

Joint procedural rules of the two chambers require most legislation to be introduced very early in the legislative session each year, and to meet strict deadlines for completion of each step of the legislative process. Joint procedural rules also limit each legislator to introducing five bills per year, subject to certain exceptions for non-binding resolutions, uniform acts, interim committee bills and appropriations bills. Most members of the General Assembly decide which bills they will introduce during the legislative session (or most of them) prior to its commencement, limiting the ability of members to introduce new bills at constituent request once the legislative session has begun.

Most bills adopted by the General Assembly include a "safety clause" (i.e. a legislative declaration that the bill concerns an urgent matter) and take effect on July 1 following the legislative session unless otherwise provided. Some bills are enacted without a "safety clause" which makes it possible to petition to subject those bills to a referendum before they take effect, and have an effective date in August following the legislative session unless otherwise provided.

Colorado's legislature does not have an analog to the filibuster in the United States Senate requiring a supermajority for approval of any matter. The state lieutenant governor does not have the power to preside or break tie votes in either house of the General Assembly. New executive branch rules are reviewed annually by the legislature and the legislature routinely invalidates some of them each year.

The General Assembly does not have a role in the appointment or retention of state judges, although it must authorize the creation of each judgeship.

Many state agencies and programs are subject to "sunset review" and are automatically abolished if the General Assembly does not reauthorize them.

=== The state budget process ===
The governor submits a proposed budget to the Joint Budget Committee each year in advance of the year's legislative session. Colorado's fiscal year is from July 1 to June 30.

Bills introduced in the General Assembly are evaluated by the non-partisan state legislative services body for their fiscal impact and must be provided for in appropriations legislation if there is a fiscal impact.

A state budget, called the "LONG Bill" (Legislation on Operations and Normal Governance) is prepared each year by the Joint Budget Committee of the General Assembly. The House and the Senate alternate the job of introducing the long bill and making a first committee review of it. Colorado's state legislature is required to obtain voter approval in order to incur significant debt, to raise taxes, or to increase state constitutional spending limitations. It is also required to comply with a state constitutional spending mandate for K-12 education. The governor has line item veto power over appropriations.

== Current makeup ==
Based on the 2010 census, each state senator represents 143,691 constituents. The 2024 Colorado Elections resulted in the Democratic Party maintaining a majority of seats in the senate. Democrats currently hold a majority in the Senate in the 75th General Assembly: 23 Democrats and 12 Republicans.

At the 2024 elections 18 senate seats came up for re-election. As a result, the composition of the State Senate at the beginning of the 75th General Assembly is 23 Democrats and 12 Republicans.

With the Democratic majority in the current 75th General Assembly, James Coleman serves as President of the Senate and Robert Rodriguez serves as the Majority Leader.

== Composition ==
↓
23	12
Democratic	Republican

Affiliation	Party (Shading indicates majority caucus)			Total	Vacant
Affiliation	Democratic	Independent	Republican	Total	Vacant
70th General Assembly	17	0	18	35	0
Beginning of 71st Assembly	17	0	18	35	0
December 29, 2017 (Note: Cheri Jahn left the Democratic Party and registered as an independent.)	16	1	18	35	0
72nd General Assembly	19	0	16	35	0
Beginning of 73rd Assembly	20	0	15	35	0
August 22, 2022 (Note: Kevin Priola switched from the Republican Party to the Democratic Party.)	21	0	14	35	0
74th General Assembly	23	0	12	35	0
Beginning of 75th Assembly	23	0	12	35	0
November 26, 2025 (Note: Democrat Faith Winter (District 25) died.)	22	0	12	34	1
December 30, 2025 (Note: Democrat William Lindstedt was appointed to District 25.)	23	0	12	34	0
Latest voting share	65.7%	34.3%			

== Leadership ==
Position	Senator	Party	District
President	James Coleman	Democratic	33
President pro Tempore	Cathy Kipp	Democratic	14
Majority Leader	Robert Rodriguez	Democratic	32
Assistant Majority Leader	Lisa Cutter	Democratic	20
Majority Whip	Nick Hinrichsen	Democratic	3
Majority Caucus Chair	Dylan Roberts	Democratic	8
Minority Leader	Cleave Simpson	Republican	6
Assistant Minority Leader	Lisa Frizell	Republican	2
Minority Caucus Chair	Byron Pelton	Republican	1
Minority Whip	Janice Rich	Republican	7

== Members of the Colorado Senate ==
District	Name	Party	Residence	Start	Next election
1	Byron Pelton	Republican	Sterling	2022	2026
2	Lisa Frizell	Republican	Castle Rock	2024	2028
3	Nick Hinrichsen	Democratic	Pueblo	2022 (Note: Originally appointed.)	2026
4	Mark Baisley	Republican	Sedalia	2022	2026
5	Marc Catlin	Republican	Montrose	2024	2028
6	Cleave Simpson	Republican	Alamosa	2020	2028 (term limited)
7	Janice Rich	Republican	Grand Junction	2022	2026
8	Dylan Roberts	Democratic	Eagle	2022	2026
9	Lynda Zamora Wilson	Republican	Air Force Academy	2025	2026
10	Larry Liston	Republican	Colorado Springs	2020	2028 (term limited)
11	Tony Exum	Democratic	Colorado Springs	2022	2026
12	Marc Snyder	Democratic	Manitou Springs	2024	2028
13	Scott Bright	Republican	Platteville	2024	2028
14	Cathy Kipp	Democratic	Fort Collins	2024	2028
15	Janice Marchman	Democratic	Loveland	2022	2026
16	Chris Kolker	Democratic	Centennial	2020	2028 (term limited)
17	Katie Wallace	Democratic	Longmont	2025	2026 (special)
18	Judy Amabile	Democratic	Boulder	2024	2028
19	Lindsey Daugherty	Democratic	Arvada	2024	2028
20	Lisa Cutter	Democratic	Evergreen	2022	2026
21	Adrienne Benavidez	Democratic	Denver	2026	2026 (special)
22	Jessie Danielson	Democratic	Wheat Ridge	2018	2026 (term limited)
23	Barbara Kirkmeyer	Republican	Brighton	2020	2028 (term limited)
24	Kyle Mullica	Democratic	Northglenn	2022	2026
25	William Lindstedt	Democratic	Broomfield	2025	2026
26	Jeff Bridges	Democratic	Greenwood Village	2019	2028 (term limited)
27	Tom Sullivan	Democratic	Centennial	2022	2026
28	Mike Weissman	Democratic	Aurora	2024	2028
29	Iman Jodeh	Democratic	Aurora	2025	2026 (special)
30	John Carson	Republican	Highlands Ranch	2025	2026
31	Matthew Ball	Democratic	Denver	2025	2026 (special)
32	Robert Rodriguez	Democratic	Denver	2018	2026 (term limited)
33	James Coleman	Democratic	Denver	2020	2028 (term limited)
34	Julie Gonzales	Democratic	Denver	2018	2026 (term limited)
35	Rod Pelton	Republican	Cheyenne Wells	2022	2026

== See also ==
- Outline of Colorado
- Index of Colorado-related articles
- State of Colorado
  - Government of Colorado
    - List of governors of Colorado
      - List of lieutenant governors of Colorado
    - Colorado General Assembly
      - Colorado Senate
      - Colorado House of Representatives
        - List of speakers of the Colorado House of Representatives
      - List of Colorado state legislatures
    - Courts of Colorado
      - Colorado Supreme Court
- Federal government
  - United States Congress
    - Colorado's congressional delegations
      - List of United States senators from Colorado
      - List of United States representatives from Colorado
        - Colorado's congressional districts
