= Kerry Donovan =

American politician

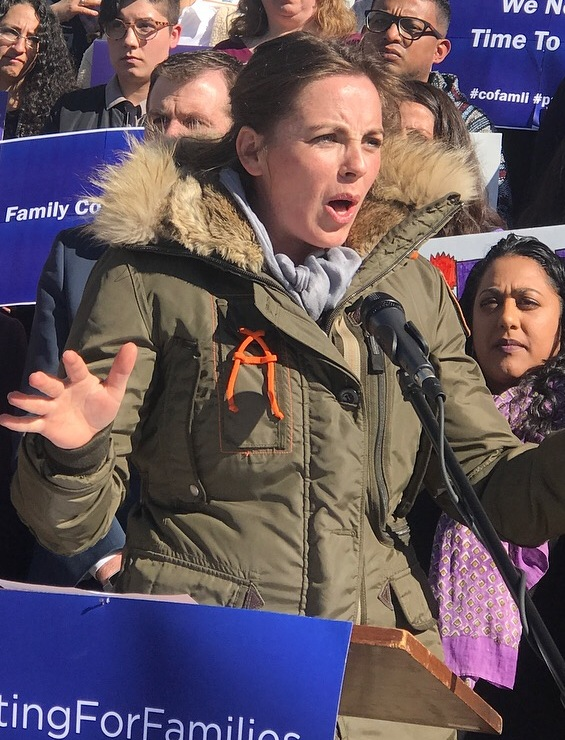

President pro tempore of the Colorado Senate
- In office January 13, 2021 – January 9, 2023
- Preceded by: Nancy Todd
- Succeeded by: James Coleman

Member of the Colorado Senate from the 5th district
- In office January 7, 2015 – January 9, 2023
- Preceded by: Gail Schwartz
- Succeeded by: Bob Rankin (redistricted)

Personal details
- Born: 1978 or 1979 (age 46–47) Vail, Colorado, U.S.
- Party: Democratic
- Spouse: Shad Murib
- Education: Northeastern Junior College; University of Notre Dame (BA)
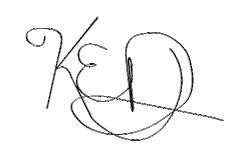
- Signature

Kerry Elizabeth Donovan (born 1978/1979) is an American politician who served as a Democratic member of the Colorado Senate from the 5th district. She also served as president pro tempore of the Colorado Senate from 2021-2023. Prior to entering the state legislature, she was active in local politics in Vail, Colorado.

Donovan was born in Vail and educated at the University of Notre Dame. She entered politics with her election to the town council in Vail. She won election to the state senate to succeed term-limited Gail Schwartz. During her tenure in the state senate, she was selected to serve as Majority Whip and President pro tempore.

== Early life and education ==
Kerry Donovan was born to John and Diana Donovan in Vail, Colorado. Her grandfather served in the 10th Mountain Division during World War II. She graduated from the University of Notre Dame with a Bachelor of Arts in anthropology. She is married to Shad Murib. Donovan served one term on the town council in Vail.

== Career ==
=== Colorado Senate ===
==== Elections ====
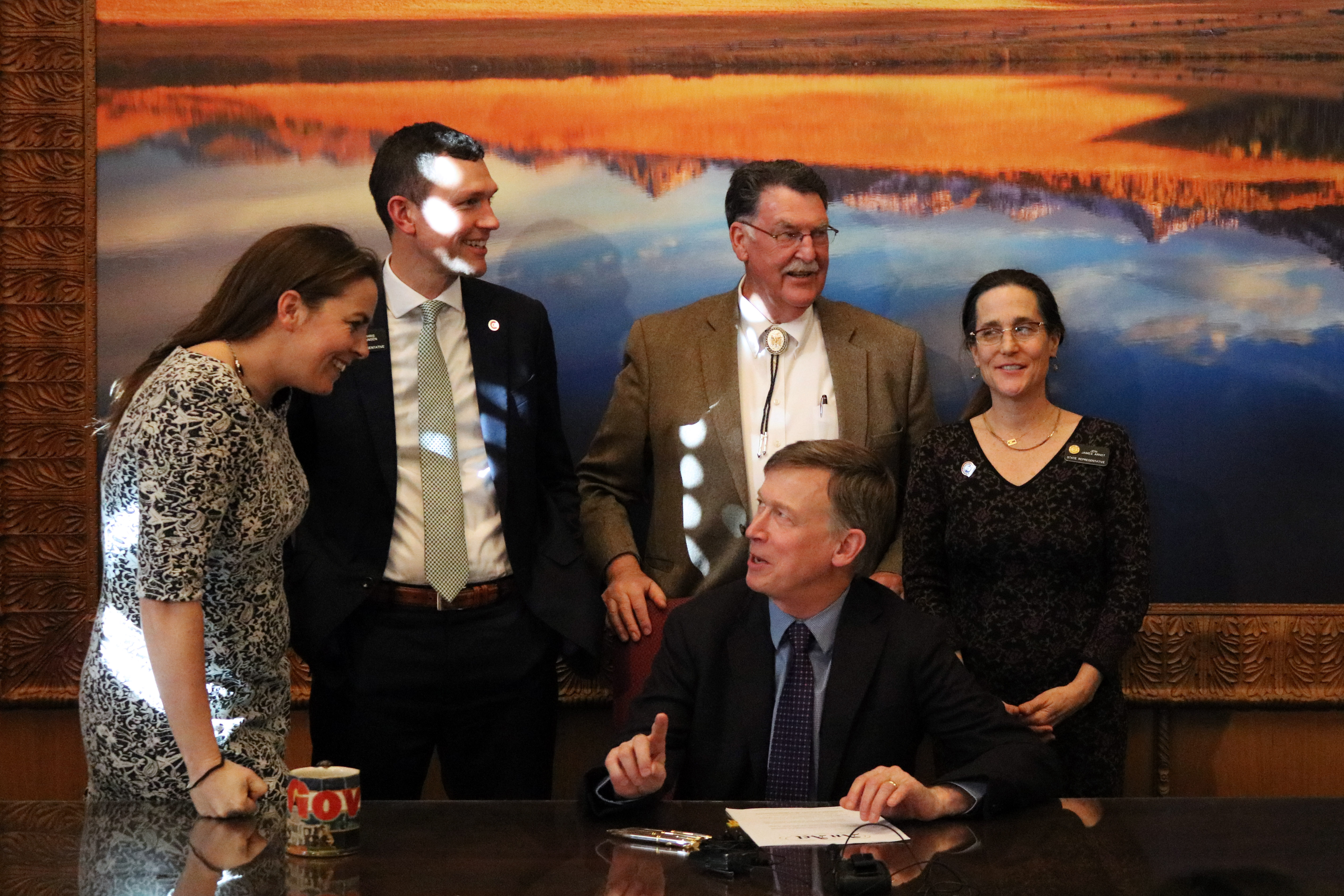
Donovan talking with Governor John Hickenlooper during a bill signing.

Senator Gail Schwartz was unable to seek reelection in the 2014 election due to term limits. Donovan won the Democratic nomination to succeed Schwartz and defeated Republican nominee Don Suppes, who served as mayor of Orchard, Colorado, and Libertarian nominee Lee Mulcahy. During the campaign she had raised around $150,000 against Suppes' $107,000 and Mulcahy's $2,750. She won reelection after defeating Republican nominee Olen Lund in the 2018 election. During the campaign she raised around $228,000 to Lund's $21,000.

==== Tenure ====
During Donovan's tenure she served as chair of the Agriculture and Natural Resources committee and as a member of the Transportation and Energy, and Legislative Council committees. Donovan was selected to serve as Majority Whip in 2018. She was selected to replace Senator Nancy Todd, who was term-limited, as president pro tempore of the state senate in 2020.

Donovan was one of the people Jared Polis considered for selection as his lieutenant gubernatorial running mate during the 2018 Colorado gubernatorial election, but Polis selected Dianne Primavera instead. During the 2020 presidential election she endorsed Senator Elizabeth Warren for the Democratic presidential nomination.

=== Congressional campaigns ===
In 2017, Donovan declined to run for the Democratic nomination in Colorado's 2nd congressional district after Representative Polis announced that he would run for governor. In 2020, Donovan considered a run for the United States Senate, but ended up declining and endorsed former Governor John Hickenlooper. Donovan filed to run for the Democratic nomination in Colorado's 3rd congressional district for the 2022 election on February 3, 2021, becoming the third person to enter the primary. Donovan suspended her campaign's fundraising after Colorado's congressional redistricting commission approved a map. She ended her campaign on November 5, due to her being drawn out of the 3rd congressional district by redistricting and instead placed into the 2nd congressional district represented by Joe Neguse, a member of the Democratic Party.

== Political positions ==
Donovan introduced legislation with Senator Owen Hill to allow voters to take photos of their ballots as under the current law voters face up to one year in prison and a $1,000 fine for taking a photo of their ballot.

Donovan introduced legislation that created Public Lands Day as a state holiday in Colorado to recognize the twenty-four million acres of public land in Colorado and its importance in the life and economy of Colorado. The legislation was passed in the state senate by a vote of twenty-eight to seven and in the state house by a vote of 39 to 26.

Donovan sponsored legislation in the state senate which would create a paid family leave system which would be paid for by having employees pay 0.99% of their salary. She and Representatives Marc Catlin and Dylan Roberts introduced legislation which called for the Regulatory Agencies and Health Care Policy and Financing departments to create a public healthcare option that would add to Connect for Health Colorado, Colorado's medical care exchange.

== Electoral history ==
2014 Colorado Senate 5th district election
Primary election
Party	Candidate	Votes	%
Democratic	Kerry Donovan	4,835	100.00%
Total votes		4,835	100.00%
General election
Democratic	Kerry Donovan	27,526	49.04%
Republican	Don Suppes	26,225	46.73%
Libertarian	Lee Mulcahy	2,374	4.23%
Total votes		56,125	100.00%

2018 Colorado Senate 5th district election
Primary election
Party	Candidate	Votes	%
Democratic	Kerry Donovan (incumbent)	13,707	100.00%
Total votes		13,707	100.00%
General election
Democratic	Kerry Donovan (incumbent)	41,838	60.45%
Republican	Olen Lund	27,375	39.55%
Total votes		69,213	100.00%

Colorado Senate
Preceded by Nancy Todd	President pro tempore of the Colorado Senate; 2021–2023	Succeeded by James Coleman
