= Gregg Rippy =

American politician

Member of the Colorado House of Representatives from the 61st district
- In office January 8, 2003 – January 12, 2005
- Preceded by: Carl Miller
- Succeeded by: Kathleen Curry

Member of the Colorado House of Representatives from the 57th district
- In office January 10, 2001 – January 8, 2003
- Preceded by: Russell George
- Succeeded by: Al White

Personal details
- Party: Republican

Gregg Rippy is an American politician who served in the Colorado House of Representatives from 2001 to 2005.
