= Randy Baumgardner =

American politician

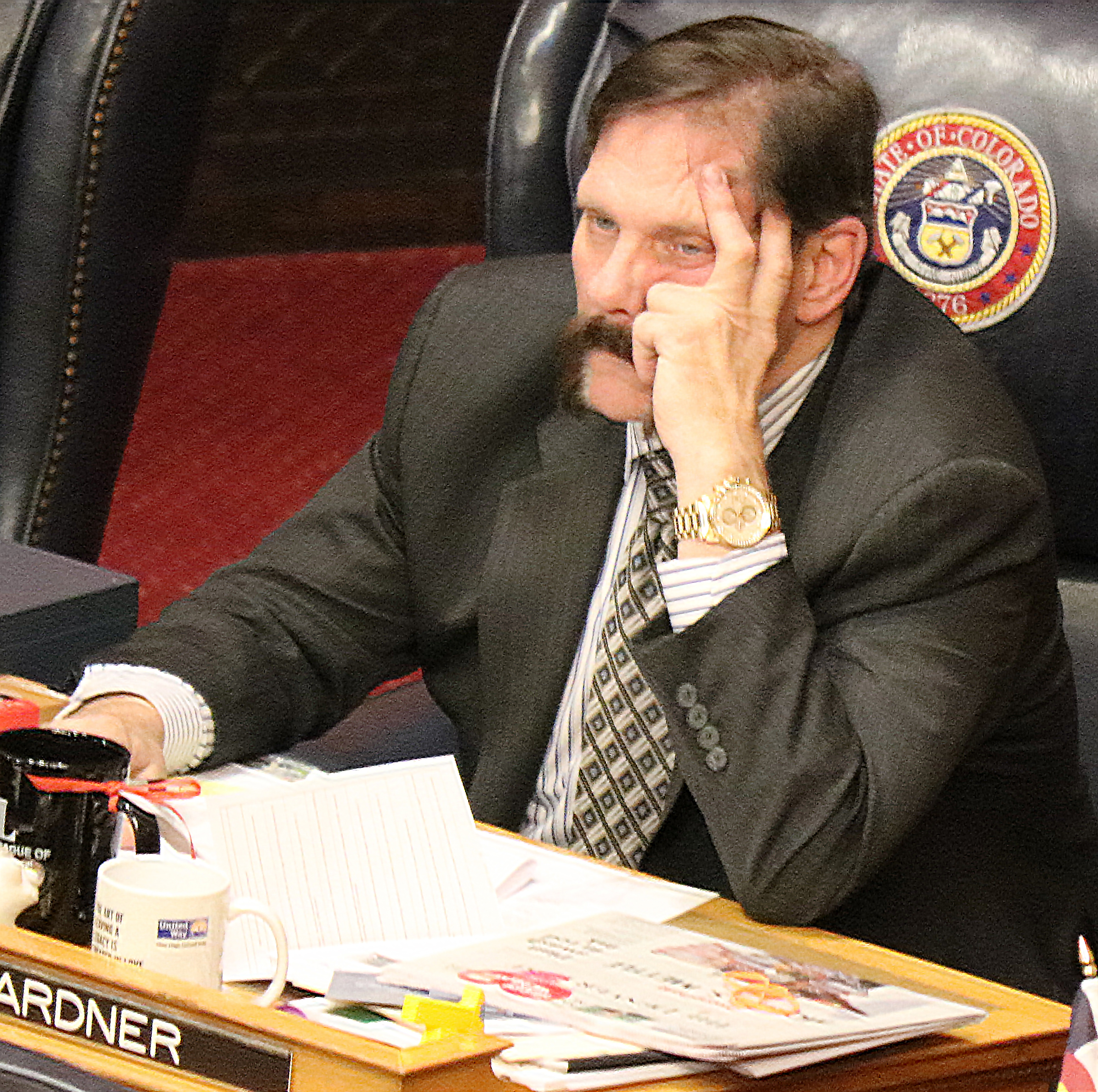

Member of the Colorado Senate from the 8th district
- In office January 15, 2013 – January 21, 2019
- Preceded by: Jean White
- Succeeded by: Bob Rankin

Member of the Colorado House of Representatives from the 57th district
- In office January 7, 2009 – January 9, 2013
- Preceded by: Al White
- Succeeded by: Bob Rankin

Personal details
- Born: Bedford, Indiana, U.S.
- Party: Republican
- Spouse: Lori
- Education: Indiana University

Randy L. Baumgardner is an American politician who served in the Colorado House of Representatives from the 57th district from 2009 to 2013, and in the Colorado Senate from the 8th district from 2013 to 2019, as a member of the Republican Party. Baumgardner resigned after more allegations came out against him following an unsuccessful expulsion vote.

== Early life ==
Randy L. Baumgardner was born in Bedford, Indiana, and attended Indiana University. He and his wife Lori moved to Grand County, Colorado, in 1994, and both of them worked for the Colorado Department of Transportation. One of his children, Charlie, died at age seven in the 1990s.

== Career ==
=== Colorado House of Representatives ===
During the 2008 election Baumgardner ran for a seat in the Colorado House of Representatives from the 57th district. He defeated Daniel L. Korkowski in the Republican primary and defeated Democratic nominee R. Todd Hagenbuch in the general election. He defeated Democratic nominee Steve Ivancie and Libertarian nominee Mike Kien in the 2010 election.

During his time in the state house Baumgardner let Michael K. Frierson, an unregistered sex offender who pled guilty to a misdemeanor charge of sexual assault against a fourteen year-old, live in his house. Frierson was later arrested for not notifying the sheriff that he had moved and for not re-registering. Lori paid Frierson's $2,000 bond and Baumgarder stated that he was helping Frierson rebuild his life.

=== Colorado Senate ===
During the 2012 election Baumgardner challenged incumbent Republican Senator Jean White for a seat in the Colorado Senate from the 8th district. He defeated White in the primary and defeated Democratic nominee Emily Tracy and Libertarian nominee Sacha L. Weis in the general election. He defeated Tracy again in the 2016 election.

On July 12, 2013, he announced that he would seek the Republican nomination for the United States Senate election in 2014. However, he did not win enough support from delegates at the state assembly to appear on the primary ballot and Cory Gardner received 73% of the delegate vote.

Baumgardner was selected to serve as the Majority Whip in the state senate in 2015.

==== Sexual Harassment ====
Megan Creeden, a legislative intern, accused Baumgardner of sexual harassment in which he slapped her butt and of making inappropriate comments. She filed a sexual harassment complaint against him in 2017. Baumgardner denied the allegations against him, but stepped down as chair of a committee. Senate President Kevin Grantham only requested for him to attend sensitivity training. The Democratic members of the state senate attempted to have Baumgardner expelled, but it failed in a seventeen to seventeen vote, below the twenty-four votes needed, which Senator Don Coram (R) called a "public lynching". Senator Ray Scott was the only Republican to vote in favor of expelling Baumgardner.

Two other complaints which alleged that Baumgardner created a hostile and offensive work environment and of inappropriate actions with a female intern were verified by an outside investigation. He was removed from his committee assignments by Grantham. He announced that he would be leaving the state senate after the additional allegations came out and resigned on January 21, 2019. Bob Rankin, a member of the state house, was selected to replace Baumgardner in the state senate.

== Electoral history ==
Randy Baumgardner electoral history

2008 Colorado House of Representatives 57th district election
Primary election
Party	Candidate	Votes	%
Republican	Randy Baumgardner	2,319	67.24%
Republican	Daniel L. Korkowski	1,130	32.76%
Total votes		3,449	100.00%
General election
Republican	Randy Baumgardner	19,929	56.50%
Democratic	R. Todd Hagenbuch	15,346	43.50%
Total votes		35,275	100.00%

2010 Colorado House of Representatives 57th district election
Primary election
Party	Candidate	Votes	%
Republican	Randy Baumgardner (incumbent)	8,611	100.00%
Total votes		8,611	100.00%
General election
Republican	Randy Baumgardner (incumbent)	18,207	60.79%
Democratic	Steve Ivancie	8,999	30.05%
Libertarian	Mike Kien	1,196	3.99%
Total votes		29,949	100.00%

2012 Colorado Senate 8th district election
Primary election
Party	Candidate	Votes	%
Republican	Randy Baumgardner	6,809	58.22%
Republican	Jean White (incumbent)	4,887	41.78%
Total votes		11,696	100.00%
General election
Republican	Randy Baumgardner	34,187	51.06%
Democratic	Emily Tracy	29,688	44.34%
Libertarian	Sacha L. Weis	3,079	4.60%
Total votes		66,954	100.00%

2016 Colorado Senate 8th district election
Primary election
Party	Candidate	Votes	%
Republican	Randy Baumgardner (incumbent)	8,638	100.00%
Total votes		8,638	100.00%
General election
Republican	Randy Baumgardner (incumbent)	39,526	54.85%
Democratic	Emily Tracy	32,530	45.15%
Total votes		72,056	100.00%
