= Carl Miller =

Carl or Karl Miller may refer to:

- Carl Miller (basketball) (born 1966), British basketball player
- Carl Miller (actor) (1893–1979), American film actor
- Carl Miller (author), British author and speaker
- Karl Miller (1931–2014), British writer
- Karl Miller (footballer) (1913–1967), German international footballer
- Carl Ferris Miller (1921–2002), American-born South Korean banker and arborist
- Carl Miller (politician) (1938–2025), American politician
