= Jean White (politician) =

American politician

Member of the Colorado Senate
- In office 2011–2013
- Preceded by: Al White
- Succeeded by: Randy Baumgardner
- Constituency: District 8

Personal details
- Party: Republican
- Spouse: Al White

Jean White is an American politician. She served in the Colorado Senate, after being appointed to replace her husband Al White.

White endorsed the Mitt Romney 2012 presidential campaign.
