= Senator Whitehead =

Senator Whitehead may refer to:

- Bruce Whitehead (fl. 1980s–2010s), Colorado State Senate
- Jim Whitehead (politician) (born 1942), Georgia State Senate
- John Meek Whitehead (1852–1924), Wisconsin State Senate
