= Gail Schwartz =

American politician

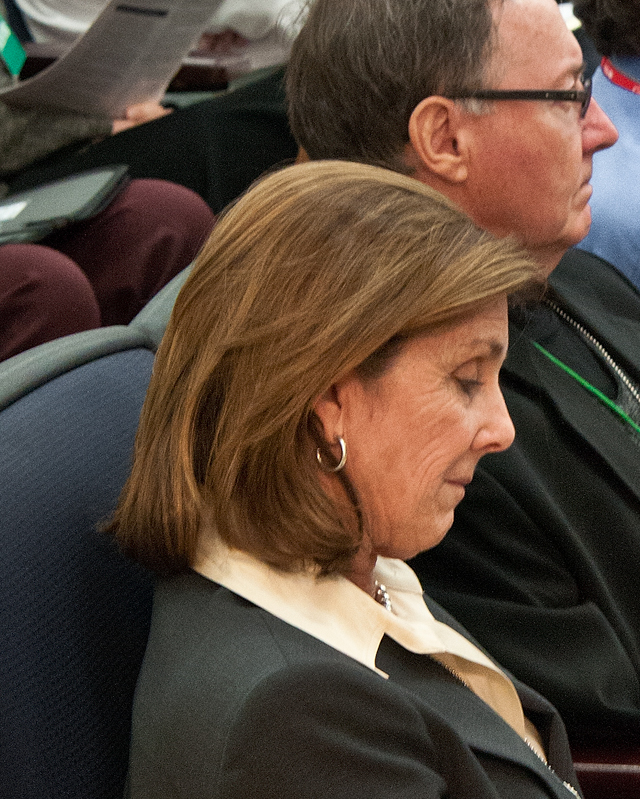

Member of the Colorado Senate from the 5th district
- In office January 10, 2007 – January 7, 2015
- Preceded by: Lewis Entz
- Succeeded by: Kerry Donovan

Personal details
- Party: Democratic
- Spouse: Alan E. Schwartz
- Education: University of Colorado

Gail Sheridan Schwartz is a former legislator in the U.S. state of Colorado. Elected to the Colorado State Senate as a Democrat in 2006, Schwartz represented Senate District 5, which covers a large section of south-central Colorado, ranging from Aspen, and Delta, Colorado through the San Luis Valley to the New Mexico border. Schwartz left office in 2015 after serving two terms and unsuccessfully ran for the United States House of Representatives in Colorado's 3rd congressional district.

== Biography ==
Born and raised in Chicago, Schwartz holds a bachelor's degree in marketing from the University of Colorado Boulder. Schwartz has worked as Director of Development, and later Acting Director for the Aspen/Pitkin County Housing Authority. She has also worked as a real estate and marketing consultant and as an executive for Sno-Engineering, Inc.

Schwartz was involved in education issues in the Aspen School District, including campaigning for a $4 million local bond election for technology in local schools. She received the Aspen School District's "Outstanding Service Award." She was appointed by Governor Roy Romer to the Colorado Commission on Higher Education as a representative of the Western Slope from 1995 to 1999.

In 2000, Schwartz was nominated as the Democratic candidate for the Board of Regents of the University of Colorado from Colorado's 3rd congressional district. She faced Republican incumbent Hank Anton and campaigned on increasing accessibility to higher education, particularly for the largely rural and underserved Western Slope of Colorado. She was elected with roughly 51 percent of the popular vote, becoming the third Democrat on the nine-member board. After being elected, Schwartz supported adding sexual orientation to the university's nondiscrimination policy. Schwartz also served as vice-chair of the Board of Regents.

Schwartz is married; she and her husband, Alan, have three daughters. As of 2018, her family resides in Basalt, Colorado.

== Electoral history ==
=== 2006 ===
2006 Colorado State Senate election, District 5
Party	Candidate	Votes	%
Democratic	Gail Schwartz	24,677	51.0%
Republican	Lewis Entz (incumbent)	23,691	49.0%
Total votes		48,368	100
Democratic gain from Republican			

=== 2010 ===
2010 Colorado State Senate election, District 5
Party	Candidate	Votes	%
Democratic	Gail Schwartz (incumbent)	26,355	51.5%
Republican	Bob Rankin	25,269	48.5%
Total votes		51,624	100
Democratic hold			

=== 2016 ===
Colorado's 3rd congressional district, 2016
Party	Candidate	Votes	%
Republican	Scott Tipton (incumbent)	204,220	54.6
Democratic	Gail Schwartz	150,914	40.4
Libertarian	Gaylon Kent	18,903	5.0
Total votes		374,037	100.0
Republican hold			

== Legislative career ==
=== 2006 election ===
In the 2006 Colorado legislative elections, Schwartz defeated incumbent Republican Lewis Entz with less than 51 percent of the popular vote. Schwartz was elected to represent Senate District 5, which includes Alamosa, Chaffee, Conejos, Costilla, Delta, Gunnison, Hinsdale, Mineral, Pitkin, Rio Grande, and Saguache Counties.

=== 2007 legislative session ===
In the 2007 session of the General Assembly, Schwartz was vice-chair of the Senate Agriculture, Natural Resources & Energy Committee, vice-chair of the Senate Local Government Committee, and sat on the Senate Business, Labor and Technology Committee.

Following the regular session, Schwartz chaired the legislature's interim committee on allocation of severance tax and federal mineral lease revenues and served on the Water Resources Review Committee.

=== 2008 legislative session ===
In the 2008 session of the General Assembly, Schwartz serves as vice-chair of the Senate Agriculture, Natural Resources & Energy Committee, vice-chair of the Senate Local Government Committee, and sits on the Senate Business, Labor and Technology Committee and the Legislative Audit Committee.

During the 2008 session, Schwartz sponsored legislation to require Colorado's chief information officer to map broadband internet access in Colorado, and legislation to require greater public disclosure about prospective mining activities. In total, Schwartz sponsored 16 House and Senate bills, 14 of which were passed into law.

=== 2009 legislative session ===
Following the legislative session, Schwartz was appointed to a seat on the legislature's Capital Development Committee, replacing term-limited Sen. Sue Windels. For the 2009 session of the Colorado General Assembly, she was named chair of the Senate Local Government and Energy Committee and a member of the Senate Agriculture and Natural Resources Committee.

Schwartz voted yes for Senate Bill 170 would have allowed students who are in the country illegally and who have graduated from Colorado high schools to pay in-state tuition plus the cost of a state stipend that other Colorado students receive. The bill was rejected.

In November 2008, Schwartz was named chair of a special legislative Committee on Job Creation and Economic Growth, tasked with developing recommendations on bolstering Colorado's economy before the 2009 legislative session. The committee developed some 30 proposals, ranging from public works projects to tax incentives, designed to spur job creation in Colorado, for consideration during the 2009 legislative session.

Schwartz was one of a handful of Colorado legislators who attended the January 2009 inauguration of President Barack Obama in person.

== 2016 Congressional candidacy ==
Schwartz unsuccessfully sought to represent Colorado's 3rd congressional district in the United States House of Representatives. The Cook Political Report described Schwartz as the "top potential" recruit for Democrats for the race, citing Schwartz's previous successful campaigns in tough elections. Schwartz won the Democratic primary for the seat, but lost to Republican incumbent Scott Tipton in the general election.
