= Ellen Roberts =

Colorado State Representative (born 1959)

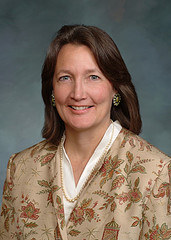

Member of the Colorado Senate from the 6th district
- In office January 12, 2011 – December 31, 2016
- Preceded by: Bruce Whitehead
- Succeeded by: Don Coram

Member of the Colorado House of Representatives from the 59th district
- In office January 2007 – January 2011
- Preceded by: Mark Larson
- Succeeded by: J. Paul Brown

Personal details
- Born: August 27, 1959 (age 67) Hudson, New York, U.S.
- Party: Republican
- Spouse: Rick Roberts
- Education: Cornell University; University of Colorado, Boulder

Ellen Stuart Roberts (born August 27, 1959) is an attorney and former Republican legislator in the U.S. State of Colorado. From 2006 to 2010, Roberts served as the State Representative for House District 59. In 2010, she was elected to Senate District 6 and served until her resignation, saying that she wanted to spend more time in her home region, at the end of 2016. In 2015, she was elected to serve as the President Pro-Tem for the Colorado State Senate, a position she held until her resignation.

== Biography ==
Born in Hudson, New York, Roberts was raised in Rhinebeck, where she was elected class president in high school. She earned a self-designed undergraduate degree in environmental policy from Cornell University in 1981. During college, she spent a semester as an intern in Washington DC, working for her Congressional representative and for the Republican National Committee.

She moved to Colorado upon graduation and worked as a ranger in Rocky Mountain National Park until 1984. In 1982, Roberts married; she and her husband, Rick, have two children: Caitlin and Ben, both of whom have attended Fort Lewis College in Durango, Colorado.

After being hired by a law firm in Granby, Colorado, Roberts returned to school to earn a J.D. from the University of Colorado in 1986. She worked as an attorney in private practice in Granby and Hot Sulphur Springs, specializing in estate, probate and business law.

A resident of Durango, Colorado since 1989, she joined the Southwest Colorado Bar Association in 1986 and served as its president, and as president of the Southwest Colorado Women's Bar Association. As an attorney, Roberts advocated for increased legal services for immigrants and Spanish-speakers in southwestern Colorado

Roberts has focused on health care, constitutional reform, judicial, and financial issues in the state legislature, and, despite being in the minority party, has seen almost all legislation she sponsored signed into law. She has also carried legislation to strengthen private property rights surrounding oil and gas drilling, and to create a legislative youth advisory council.

== Early career ==
Roberts began to re-enter politics after the death of her father in 1992, first focusing on hospice and health care issues. As a member (since 1999) and later chairman of the board of Mercy Regional Medical Center, she pushed for the construction of a new hospital in Durango. She chaired Healthy 58, a rural health care task force, and in 2001, was appointed to the Task Force to Evaluate Health Care Needs for Colorado, a commission formed by the legislature to study health-care needs in rural Colorado communities.

Roberts sat on the Sixth Judicial District Nominating Commission, and co-chaired the Durango Citizens Steering Committee for a New Library, a successful effort to push for a new local public library that was eventually built on the site of Mercy Medical Center, the hospital Roberts had worked to help replace. She was a member of the Citizens Health Advisory Council, the High Noon Rotary Club, and sat on the boards of First National Bank and the Community Foundation Serving Southwest Colorado. In 2004, she won the Durango Chamber of Commerce's Athena Award for professional women in business.

== Colorado House of Representatives ==
=== 2006 election ===
In December 2004, only a month after Larson was elected to his fourth and final term in the state house, Roberts filed for a 2006 candidacy to seek his seat. She announced her campaign formally in January 2005. She was endorsed by Larson, and won the Republican nomination unopposed.

As Representative Mark Larson neared the end of his term-limited tenure in the Colorado House of Representatives, Roberts began to work with him on learning the legislative process, in preparation for seeking elected office herself. She instigated a bill, introduced by Larson and eventually signed into law, to require that remains be handled in accordance with the wishes of the deceased. She also lobbied the legislature, unsuccessfully, for the creation of an interim committee to study palliative care.

During the general election campaign, Roberts emphasized her work on health care issues and her experience working with Representative Larson in the legislature, and criticized the passage of constitutional amendments creating conflicting fiscal obligations. Although both Roberts and her main opponent, Democrat Joe Colgan, signed a clean campaign pledge, controversy arose over advertisements run by outside sources. In particular, Roberts denounced as "misleading" and "unacceptable" a television advertisement criticizing Colgan's record as mayor of Durango. The ad, which was run by a political group associated with the Colorado Association of Home Builders, was later pulled off the air. Direct mail flyers sent by right-leaning outside groups during the last weeks of the campaign also misrepresented both candidates' stances on immigration, exaggerating the contrast between their positions.

In addition to her Democratic opponent, Roberts faced unaffiliated write-in candidate Christopher Navage. Navage withdrew from the race in October 2006 and endorsed Colgan. Roberts significantly outraised her opponents, donating over $8,000 to her own campaign, and ultimately winning the November 2006 general election with 52 percent of the vote.

=== 2007 legislative session ===
In the 2007 session of the Colorado General Assembly, Roberts was a member of the House Health and Human Services Committee, the Joint Legal Services Committee, and the House Judiciary Committee.

Roberts was one of the most successful Republican legislators at passing legislation through the Democrat-controlled legislature, and has been identified by media reports and commentators as a "standout" legislator and a potential candidate for higher office. She also organized bowling outings for legislators during her first year in the legislature.

Roberts carried legislation which revised Colorado's surface rights laws, requiring oil and gas companies to minimize the impacts of drilling. The bill was weakened by lobbying from the Colorado Oil and Gas Association, but represented a breadth of reform that had failed to pass in previous legislative sessions.

During her first legislative session, Roberts also sponsored bills to revise the process by which special health care districts are created and to expand eligibility for Korean War special license plates; she cosponsored legislation to fund study of a methane seep in southwestern Colorado.

Her only unsuccessful bill was a measure to tighten the rules under which cigar bars could claim exemptions from Colorado's indoor smoking ban. After being killed in committee, the measure was revived in the Colorado Senate by Democrats, but was again unsuccessful.

Following the 2007 session, Roberts was named by House Republican leadership to the newly formed Criminal and Juvenile Justice Commission. In November 2007, she was named a Legislator of Merit by the Colorado Behavioral Health Council. She joined with other Republicans to criticize an executive order issued by Governor Bill Ritter allowing collective bargaining with government employee unions as a betrayal of Ritter's promise of bipartisan cooperation on major issues.

=== 2008 legislative session ===
In the 2008 session of the Colorado General Assembly, Roberts sat on the House Health and Human Services Committee and the House Judiciary Committee. She introduced eight bills during the session, all of which were passed by the legislature.

During the 2008 legislative session, Roberts introduced a bill, drafted and lobbied for by Colorado students, to create a legislative youth advisory council. The bill stalled in the legislature until its minimal cost was approved by the House Appropriations Committee, after which it cleared both the House and Senate, and Governor Bill Ritter signed it into law. She was later appointed by Minority Leader Mike May to be one of the legislative members of the council.

Roberts introduced a bill which would grant advanced practice nurses power to sign off on additional medical forms, in response to shortages of doctors in portions of rural Colorado, a measure which garnered support from both nurses' and doctors' associations. In March, she backed a proposal to require that insurance companies offer low-cost health care benefit packages for Coloradoans, as part of a "public-private" plan towards achieving universal coverage.

Roberts was the sponsor of a legislative resolution urging the Federal Communications Commission to support including southwestern Colorado, including portions of her district, within the Denver media market, a resolution she introduced again in 2010.

Before the session began, Roberts had expressed interest in sponsoring legislation to revise the process by which the Colorado Constitution is amended through ballot measures, proposing that supermajority popular votes be required to enact amendments. She proposed extending the public hearing process as a means of providing additional input on ballot measures, and, in February 2008, was appointed to a six-member legislative panel tasked with developing recommendations for constitutional reform. She was ultimately a cosponsor of the panel's proposal to create distinctions in the petition process between constitutional and statutory amendments,; the proposal which was referred by the legislature to voters and appeared on the November 2008 Colorado ballot as Referendum O. Roberts campaigned in support of Referendum O during the fall campaign.

Roberts was one of a few Republicans to back a measure to reform spending requirements in Colorado's state constitution. The proposal, which would have diverted excess revenues under TABOR to K-12 education, was regarded as a sweeping revision to competing constitutional mandates; it was not passed by the General Assembly, but was advanced as a citizens' initiative.

=== 2008 election ===
Roberts was nominated by the Republican Party for a second term in the state house; she faced no challengers either in the Republican primary or in the general election.

Roberts stood against some fellow Republicans by opposing Amendment 52, a ballot measure on the November ballot that would reallocate some severance tax revenue from water projects to transportation. She also backed Republican presidential candidate John McCain and spoke before McCain at an October rally in Durango, Colorado.

Following her re-election, Roberts was nominated for the post of House Minority Caucus Chair, but lost the caucus' vote for the post to Rep. Amy Stephens. After losing the vote, Roberts publicly lamented the lack of rural representation in legislative leadership and alleged that Republican lawmakers were threatened with primaries if they voted for her leadership bid.

=== 2009 legislative session ===
For the 2009 legislative session, Roberts was appointed to the House Health and Human Services Committee and the House Judiciary Committee, where she was the ranking Republican member. Roberts was also named to a Republican task force charged with making recommendations on resolving the state's projected budget shortfall. In 2009, Roberts also sat on the Colorado Commission on Criminal and Juvenile Justice and co-chaired the Colorado Youth Advisory Council.

During the 2009 session, Roberts sponsored several bills relating to juvenile criminal offenders, including legislation to allow more juveniles to have their criminal records expunged, and to allow young adults to serve sentences within the Youth Offender System instead of correctional facilities. Roberts also sponsored legislation to make minor adjustment to the statutes concerning the Colorado Youth Advisory Council, legislation to create a regional self-insurance plan within the San Luis Valley, and legislation revising statutes surrounding end-of-life care.

=== 2010 legislative session ===
Following the 2009 legislative session, Roberts sat on an interim committee dealing with hospice and palliative care issues, and carried legislation originating from that committee during the 2010 session, including two bills that clarified policies surrounding end-of-life care and advance directives. Other legislation that Roberts carried in 2010 included a bill to allow voluntary income tax contributions to support 2-1-1 services, and she fought against cuts to the Native American tuition waiver program at Fort Lewis College. Roberts was one of only three Republican House members to vote in support of Colorado's 2010 budget, after successfully sponsoring an amendment that removed restrictions on Fort Lewis College's ability to set its own out-of-state tuition rates.

Roberts had planned to introduce legislation to place a one-year moratorium on new Colorado health insurance mandates with independent Rep. Kathleen Curry, as part of a proposal to overhaul the states insurance mandate commission. However, they announced at the start of the session that their proposal would not include an immediate moratorium on insurance mandates, and the legislation was killed on its first hearing in a House committee. Roberts also withdrew one of her proposals to continue a pilot program for training of Certified Nursing Assistants, on account of its cost. Roberts also sponsored a contentious piece of legislation with general election opponent Sen. Bruce Whitehead, negotiated by Governor Ritter's office, to require utilities to convert some Front Range coal-fired power plants to natural gas.

== Colorado Senate ==
=== 2010 Election ===
In June 2009, Roberts announced her intention to seek the Colorado State Senate seat held by term-limited Democratic Sen. Jim Isgar in the 2010 legislative elections, Senate District 6. After Isgar resigned from the legislature in July 2009 to head the U.S. Department of Agriculture's Rural Development office in Colorado, Democrats appointed civil engineer Bruce Whitehead to the seat; Whitehead declared his intention to run for a full term in 2010, setting up a race that Colorado Republicans viewed as one of their best opportunities to pick up a seat in the Democrat-controlled legislature.

Roberts' 2010 campaign for the Senate seat also faced a challenge in the Republican primary from former Norwood, Colorado town marshal Dean Boehler, who campaigns as a self-described "true conservative;" Boehler received 67 percent of delegate votes at the Republican district assembly to Roberts' 33, earning him the top spot on the August primary ballot. Roberts won the primary race with 54% of the vote and went on to win the general election with 61% of the vote.

=== 2011 Legislative Session ===
As state senator, Roberts served on several committees, including the Health and Human Services, Judiciary, and Legislative Legal Services Committees and also acted as ranking Republican on the Senate Local Government Committee. She served on two interim committees, the Water Resources Review Committee and the Legislative Health Benefit Exchange Implementation Review Committee until the end of the 2012 legislative session.

In addition to her responsibilities at the Colorado legislature, Roberts was appointed to the National Conference of State Legislatures’ (NCSL) Federal Deficit Reduction Task Force and, in August 2011, was elected to NCSL's executive committee. She is the only Colorado legislator to serve on either of these committees.

=== 2012 Legislative Session ===
Senator Roberts proposed legislation at the start of session regarding the surety bond required for towing carriers in rural areas. SB12-049 would have lowered the surety bond from $50,000 to $10,000 for local entities. The bill was assigned to the Senate Transportation Committee, but was postponed indefinitely after it was introduced. However, after the bill was killed, public upheaval caused Roberts to introduce a new bill, this time in the House, which resolved the same issue. HB12-1347 passed the second time around with a resounding 98–1 vote.

Senator Roberts was appointed to the National Conference of State Legislatures Budgets and Revenue Committee. In addition, she was re-elected to the executive committee for NCSL. Senator Roberts was also awarded the Legislator of the Year Award for the 2012 legislative session by the Economic Development Council of Colorado.

During the 2012 legislative session, Roberts was award a handful of awards: 2012 Champion of Conservation Award from the Colorado Coalition of Land Trusts, the 2012 Pinnacle Award from the Colorado Farm Bureau, the 2012 Common Sense in the Courtroom Award from the Colorado Civil Justice League, and the 2012 Green Colorado Legislator of the Year Award. She was also honored to win the 2012 Legislator of the Year Award from the Colorado Economic Development Council.

Due to the wild fires in the state of Colorado in 2012, Senator Roberts was elected as chairwoman of the bipartisan Lower North Fork Fire Commission, which convened during the interim and which proposed four pieces of legislation to address the threat of wildfire risk and damage in Colorado.

=== 2013 Legislative Session ===
Roberts was appointed to serve on the Senate Health and Human Services Committee.

=== 2015 Legislative Session ===
As state senator, Senator Roberts served on several committees. She served as Vice Chair of the Agriculture, Natural Resources and Energy Committee as well as Chair of the Judiciary Committee. Senator Roberts also served on the Committee Legal Services, Water Resources Review Committee, Joint Judiciary Committee and the Joint Agriculture and Natural Resources Committee. She resigned at the end of 2016.
