= Shad Murib =

Chair of the Colorado Democratic Party

Chair of the Colorado Democratic Party
- Incumbent
- Assumed office April 1, 2023
- Preceded by: Morgan Carroll

Personal details
- Born: June 14, 1987 (age 39)
- Party: Democratic
- Spouse: Kerry Donovan
- Education: University of Colorado, Boulder (BA)

Shad Murib (born June 14, 1987) is an American politician from Colorado who is the current chair of the Colorado Democratic Party. Prior to being elected chair, Shad worked for Colorado Senator John Hickenlooper on his campaign team as Outreach Director before transitioning to a role within Hickenlooper's office once he was elected. He runs the Copper Bar Ranch as well as his own consulting firm, Ulysses Strategies.

Growing up in Littleton, Colorado, Shad is a first-generation American as his parents are immigrants from Lebanon. Shad got his start in politics in 2004 volunteering in high school for John Kerry's campaign for president in 2004. He is married to Kerry Donovan, who he met while working for her campaign for state senate in Colorado in 2018.

Party political offices
Preceded by Morgan Carroll	Chair of the Colorado Democratic Party; 2023–present	Incumbent
