= Colorado's 5th Senate district =

American legislative district

Colorado's 5th State Senate district
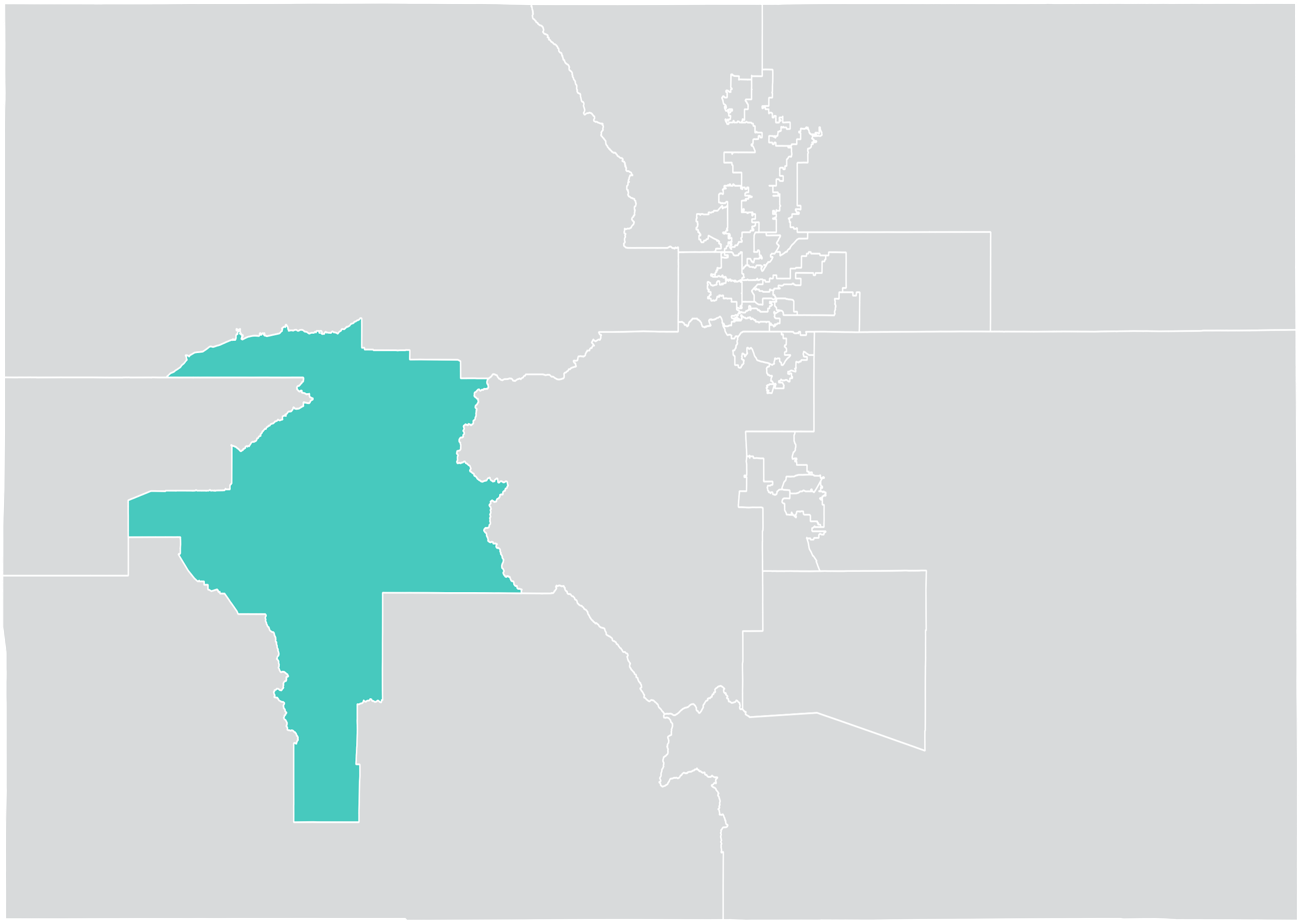
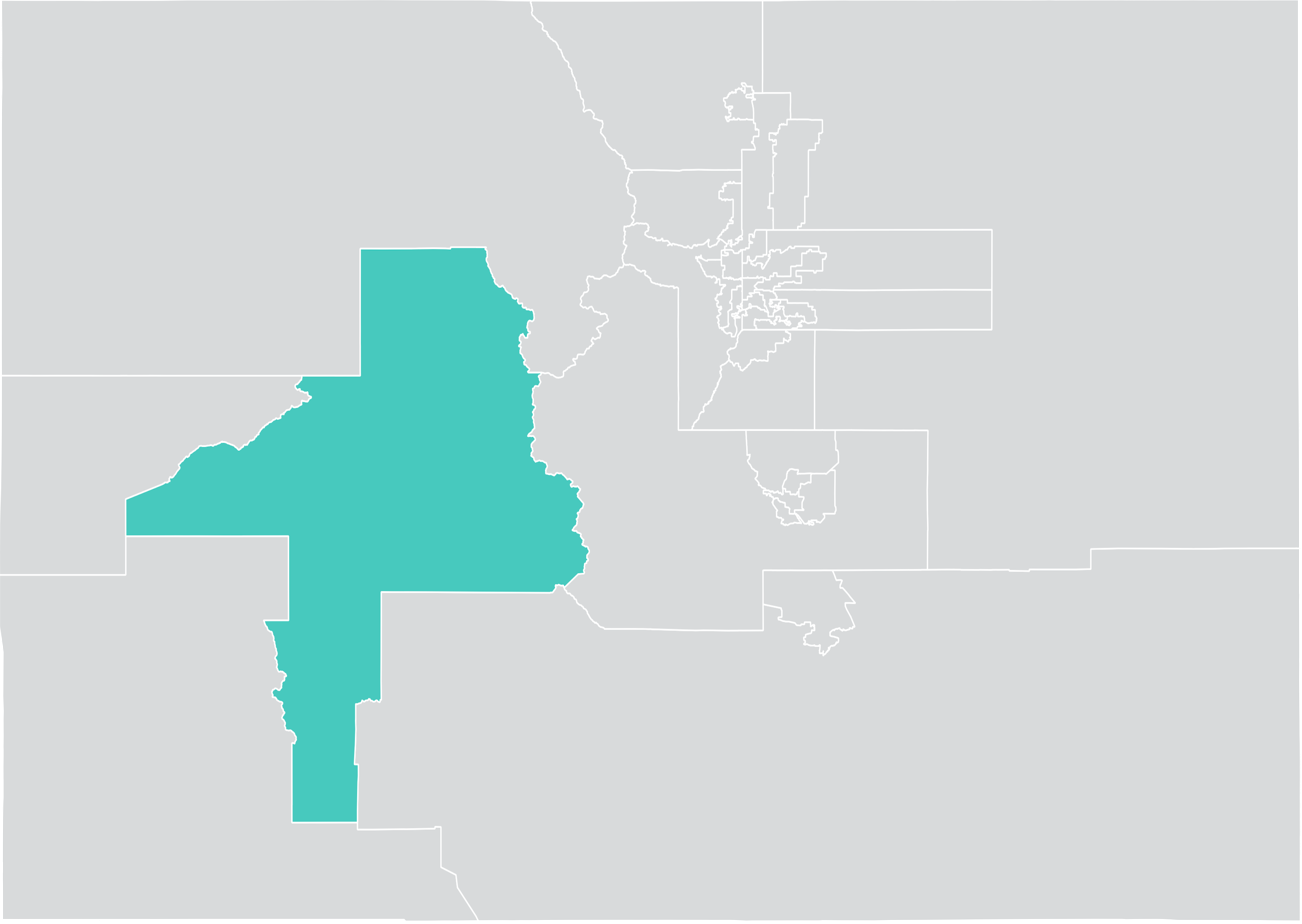
Senator
Marc Catlin; R–Montrose
- Registration: 27.5% Republican; 20.1% Democratic; 50.1% No party preference
- Demographics: 77% White; 1% Black; 19% Hispanic; 1% Asian; 1% Other
- Population (2018): 146,776
- Registered voters: 109,461

Colorado's 5th Senate district is one of 35 districts in the Colorado Senate. It has been represented by Republican Marc Catlin since January 2025.

The district was previously represented by Republicans Perry Will, Bob Rankin, and Democrats Kerry Donovan, and Gail Schwartz.

== Geography ==
Since being redrawn in 2021, District 5 covers all or parts of Montrose, Delta, Hinsdale, Gunnison, Pitkin, Garfield, and Eagle Counties. There are 22 incorporated cities and towns in the District including Aspen, Basalt, Carbondale, Crawford, Crested Butte, Delta, Glenwood Springs, Gunnison, Hotchkiss, Lake City, Marble, Montrose, Mt. Crested Butte, New Castle, Olathe, Orchard City, Paonia, Parachute, Pitkin, Rifle, Silt, and Snowmass Village.

The entire Colorado Senate District 5 is within Colorado's 3rd congressional district.

Before being redistricted in January 2022, District 5 was based in the mountain towns of the Rockies, covering all of Chaffee, Delta, Eagle, Gunnison, Hinsdale, Lake, and Pitkin Counties. Communities in the district include Vail, Avon, Basalt, Eagle, Gypsum, Minturn, Edwards, El Jebel, Eagle-Vail, Aspen, Snowmass Village, Leadville, Leadville North, Salida, Buena Vista, Gunnison, Crested Butte, Powderhorn, Delta, Cedaredge, Orchard City, Paonia, and Lake City. Prior to 2022, the district was located primarily within Colorado's 3rd congressional district, also overlapping with the 2nd and 5th congressional districts.

== Recent election results ==
Colorado state senators are elected to staggered four-year terms. The old 5th district held elections in midterm years, but the new district drawn following the 2020 Census will hold elections in presidential years.

Republican Perry Will was appointed to the senate seat by the Republican Vacancy Committee on January 7, 2023. The seat was vacant because on December 1, 2022 then current senator Bob Rankin announced his intention to resign effective January 10, 2023.

Former Senator Kerry Donovan was term-limited in 2022 regardless, but two Republican senators, Don Coram and Bob Rankin, live within the new boundaries of the 5th district. Coram, whose term ended in 2022, was unable to run for re-election because the seat wasn't up for election. Rankin represented the district beginning in January 2021 and was therefore able to remain as the district Senator.

State Representative Marc Catlin was elected to represent the district in the 2024 Colorado Senate election.

=== 2024 ===
2024 Colorado Senate election, District 5
Party	Candidate	Votes	%
Republican	Marc Catlin	46,310	52.23
Democratic	Cole Buerger	42,357	47.77
Total votes		88,667	100
Republican hold			

=== 2018 ===
2018 Colorado State Senate election, District 5
Party	Candidate	Votes	%
Democratic	Kerry Donovan (incumbent)	41,838	60.4
Republican	Olen Lund	27,375	39.6
Total votes		69,213	100
Democratic hold			

=== 2014 ===
2014 Colorado State Senate election, District 5
Party	Candidate	Votes	%
Democratic	Kerry Donovan	27,526	49.0
Republican	Don Suppes	26,225	46.7
Libertarian	Lee Mulcahy	2,374	4.2
Total votes		56,125	100
Democratic hold			

=== 2010 ===
2010 Colorado State Senate election, District 5
Party	Candidate	Votes	%
Democratic	Gail Schwartz (incumbent)	26,355	51.5%
Republican	Bob Rankin	25,269	48.5%
Total votes		51,624	100
Democratic hold			

=== 2006 ===
2006 Colorado State Senate election, District 5
Party	Candidate	Votes	%
Democratic	Gail Schwartz	24,677	51.0%
Republican	Lewis Entz (incumbent)	23,691	49.0%
Total votes		48,368	100
Democratic gain from Republican			

=== Federal and statewide results ===
Year	Office	Results
2020	President	Biden 55.9 – 41.7%
2018	Governor	Polis 55.0 – 41.4%
2016	President	Clinton 48.5 – 43.5%
2014	Senate	Udall 48.3 – 46.5%
2014	Governor	Hickenlooper 51.3 – 43.9%
2012	President	Obama 51.0 – 46.5%
