= Kathleen Curry =

American politician

Member of the Colorado House of Representatives from the 61st district
- In office 2005–2011
- Preceded by: Gregg Rippy
- Succeeded by: Roger Wilson

Personal details
- Party: Democratic; Independent
- Education: University of Massachusetts Amherst (BS); Colorado State University

Kathleen Curry is an American politician who served in the Colorado House of Representatives from the 61st district from 2005 to 2011, as a member of the Democratic and independent. She was appointed to serve as Speaker Pro-tempore by Speaker Terrance Carroll before leaving the Democratic Party in 2009.

== Early life and education ==
Kathleen Curry graduated from the University of Massachusetts Amherst with a Bachelor of Science degree in agriculture and natural resource economics and a master's degree in water resources planning and management from the Colorado State University.

== Colorado House of Representatives ==
=== Elections ===
Representative Gregg Rippy, a Republican, did not seek reelection to the Colorado House of Representatives and instead ran for a seat in the United States House of Representatives. Curry ran for a seat in the state house from the 61st district with the Democratic nomination and defeated Republican nominee Becky Rippy and Libertarian nominee Dale F. Reed in the 2004 election. She faced no opposition in the 2006 and 2008 elections.

Curry left the Democratic Party on December 28, 2009, to become an independent stating that it would be misleading to voters to run as a member of the Democratic Party when she was not aligned with the party's ideology due to her fiscally conservative stances. She submitted petitions to run as an independent for reelection in the 2010 election, but under Colorado law she had to run as a write-in candidate as she had been a member of a qualified party in the preceding year. Legislation by Curry to get rid of the restriction was passed, but did not take effect until 2011. During the campaign her write-in candidacy was endorsed by The Denver Post. Curry lost in the general election to Democratic nominee Roger Wilson, but placed ahead of Republican nominee Luke Korkowski. She won a lawsuit in which the court ruled that write-in votes where the voter forgot to fill in the oval next to the write-in line would still count.

She ran in the 2012 election as an independent and appeared on the ballot, but placed third out of five candidates and behind Democratic nominee Millie Hamner and Republican nominee Debra Irvine. Had Curry won she would have been the first independent elected to the state house since 1900.

Representative Marc Catlin, a Republican from the 58th district, was term-limited in the 2024 election. In June 2023, Curry returned to the Democratic Party and announced her campaign on August 16. In the Democratic primary election held June 25, 2024, she ran unopposed. In the general election held November 5, 2024, Republican opponent Larry Don Suckla defeated Curry, winning 54.59% of the vote to Curry's 45.41%.

=== Tenure ===
Curry served as chair of the Agriculture committee in the state house. Speaker Terrance Carroll appointed Curry as Speaker Pro-tempore, the second highest ranking position in the state house, in an attempt to keep her in the Democratic Party. During her tenure in the state house over 90% of her legislation was passed. She lost her position as chair of the Agriculture committee and as Speaker Pro-tempore after leaving the Democratic Party with Representative Randy Fischer replacing her as chair and Representative Buffie McFadyen replacing her as Speaker Pro-tempore.

== Later life ==
Curry endorsed former Speaker Andrew Romanoff for the Democratic nomination for United States Senate during the 2020 election.

== Electoral history ==
2004 Colorado House of Representatives 61st district election
Primary election
Party	Candidate	Votes	%
Democratic	Kathleen Curry	2,642	100.00%
Total votes		2,642	100.00%
General election
Democratic	Kathleen Curry	20,398	60.76%
Republican	Becky Rippy	12,320	36.70%
Libertarian	Dale F. Reed	851	2.54%
Total votes		27,942	100.00%

2006 Colorado House of Representatives 61st district election
Primary election
Party	Candidate	Votes	%
Democratic	Kathleen Curry (incumbent)	487	100.00%
Total votes		487	100.00%
General election
Democratic	Kathleen Curry (incumbent)	20,733	100.00%
Total votes		20,733	100.00%

2008 Colorado House of Representatives 61st district election
Primary election
Party	Candidate	Votes	%
Democratic	Kathleen Curry (incumbent)	1,031	100.00%
Total votes		1,031	100.00%
General election
Democratic	Kathleen Curry (incumbent)	28,012	100.00%
Total votes		28,012	100.00%

2010 Colorado House of Representatives 61st district election
Party	Candidate	Votes	%
Democratic	Roger Wilson	9,657	34.56%
Independent	Kathleen Curry (incumbent) (write-in)	9,298	33.28%
Republican	Luke Korkowski	8,987	32.16%
Total votes		27,942	100.00%

2012 Colorado House of Representatives 61st district election
Party	Candidate	Votes	%
Democratic	Millie Hamner (incumbent)	19,621	47.40%
Republican	Debra Irvine	14,124	34.12%
Independent	Kathleen Curry	5,732	13.85%
Libertarian	Ellen Temby	1,132	2.73%
American Constitution	Robert E. Petrowsky	783	1.89%
Total votes		41,392	100.00%
