= Lewis Entz =

American politician (1931–2025)

Lewis H. Entz
- Entz in 2006

Member of the Colorado Senate from the 5th district
- In office April 4, 2001 – January 10, 2007
- Preceded by: Gigi Dennis
- Succeeded by: Gail Schwartz

Member of the Colorado House of Representatives from the 60th district
- In office January 12, 1983 – January 6, 1999
- Preceded by: James R. Lillpop
- Succeeded by: Al Gagliardi

Personal details
- Born: September 7, 1931 Monte Vista, Colorado, U.S.
- Died: December 10, 2025 (aged 94)
- Party: Republican
- Spouses: Lora Jean Chambers (m. 1952; died 2014); Kathryn Bigley Entz (m. 2020)
- Children: One son and three daughters
- Profession: Farmer

Lewis H. Entz (September 7, 1931 – December 10, 2025) was an American politician and farmer from Colorado. A Republican, he served in the Colorado Senate for five years and nine months, from April 2001 until January 2007. Prior to serving in the Colorado Senate, he was a member of the Colorado House of Representatives for 16 years, from 1983 to 1999. He also served as an Alamosa County Commissioner.

== Elected offices ==
Entz's first elected office was to the Alamosa County Board of County Commissioners. He served 14 years as commissioner and served as board chair for part of that time. Entz was first elected to the Colorado House of Representatives in 1982. He was re-elected in 1984, 1986, 1988, 1990, 1992, 1994 and 1996. He represented House District 60. From 1983 to early 1993, his district included Alamosa, Conejos, Costilla, Gunnison, Hinsdale, Mineral, Rio Grande and Saguache counties. Following 1992 reapportionment, in the house session that began in 1993, his district included Alamosa, Conejos, Costilla, Huerfano, Las Animas, Mineral, Rio Grande and Saguache counties. His service in the State House ended in January 1999.

Following the resignation of Gigi Dennis from the Colorado Senate on March 30, 2001, a vacancy committee selected Entz as her replacement. He was sworn in on April 4, 2001 and began representing Colorado's 5th Senate district which included Alamosa, Costilla, Conejos, Custer, Mineral, Huerfano, Las Animas, Pueblo, Rio Grande and Saguache counties. He ran for election to the office in the 2002 general election and won, defeating two opponents. Following 2002 reapportionment the district included Alamosa, Chaffee, Conejos, Costilla, Delta, Gunnison, Hinsdale, Mineral, Pitkin, Rio Grande, and Saguache counties. Entz ran for re-election to the senate in 2006 but lost to Democrat Gail Schwartz. His service in the senate ended in January 2007.

== Farming ==
In 1954, Entz started a potato farm near Hooper, Colorado. The 160-acre (65-hectare) plot of land he started farming was wet and alkaline, and salt grass was the only plant that grew on it. Entz drained the land to remove the salt. By 1986, Entz Farms, as his operation came to be called, covered 1,000 acres (400 hectares) and used mechanical harvesters to extract the potatoes from the ground, remove the dirt, and load the produce into the farm's fleet of trucks.

== Personal life and death ==
Entz served in the United States Marine Corps during the Korean War. Entz was married twice. He married Lora Jean Chambers in 1952, and they had four children together. She died in 2004. In 2020, he married Kathryn Bigley, who survived him. He died on December 10, 2025, at the age of 94.
