= Perry Will =

American politician

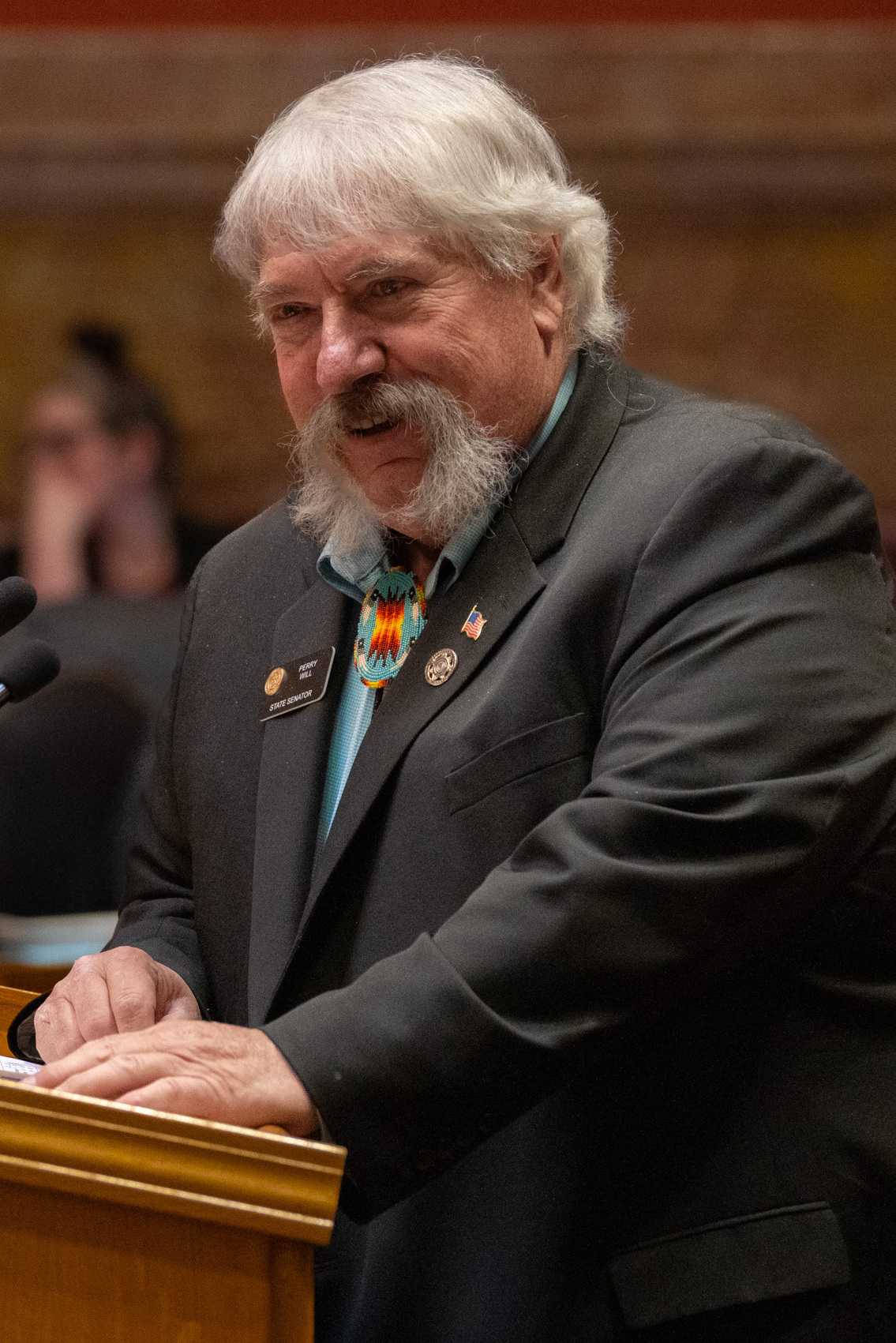
- Will in 2023

Board of County Commissioners of Garfield County from the 2nd district
- Incumbent
- Assumed office January 14, 2025
- Preceded by: John F. Martin

Member of the Colorado Senate from the 5th district
- In office January 12, 2023 – January 8, 2025
- Preceded by: Bob Rankin
- Succeeded by: Marc Catlin

Member of the Colorado House of Representatives from the 57th district
- In office February 5, 2019 – January 9, 2023
- Preceded by: Bob Rankin
- Succeeded by: Elizabeth Velasco

Personal details
- Party: Republican
- Website: Official website

Perry Will is an American politician and retired wildlife officer from the state of Colorado who currently serves on the Board of County Commissioners in Garfield County, Colorado, representing the Second District. Prior to this position, Will served as a member of the Colorado House of Representatives from 2019 to 2023. He later served in the Colorado State Senate, a position he was appointed to following the resignation of Bob Rankin.

Will was appointed to the State House following incumbent Bob Rankin's appointment to the State Senate. A vacancy committee met and chose Will from a field of four candidates, including Rankin's wife Joyce. Prior to his appointment to the legislature, Will had worked as a game warden with Colorado Parks and Wildlife for 43 years.

In the 2022 Colorado House of Representatives election, Will was defeated by Democrat Elizabeth Velasco. Following Bob Rankin's announced resignation from the State Senate on January 10, 2023, a vacancy committee selected Will to fill Rankin's seat. Will represented the newly-reapportioned Senate District 5.

In January 2024, Will announced that he would not seek another term in the Colorado Senate. Instead, he ran for a seat on the Board of County Commissioners of Garfield County. In the Republican primary election held June 25, 2024, he ran unopposed. In the general election held November 5, 2024, Will defeated Democratic candidate Caitlin Carey, winning 53.29% of the total votes cast.

== Electoral history ==
2020 Colorado House of Representatives election, 57th District
Party	Candidate	Votes	%
Republican	Perry Will (incumbent)	25,433	63.38%
Democratic	Colin Wilhelm	14,692	36.62%
Total votes		40,125	100%
Republican hold			

2022 Colorado House of Representatives election, 57th District
Party	Candidate	Votes	%
Democratic	Elizabeth Velasco	19,885	53.86%
Republican	Perry Will (incumbent)	17,033	46.14%
Total votes		36,918	100%
Democratic gain from Republican			
