= Marc Catlin =

American politician

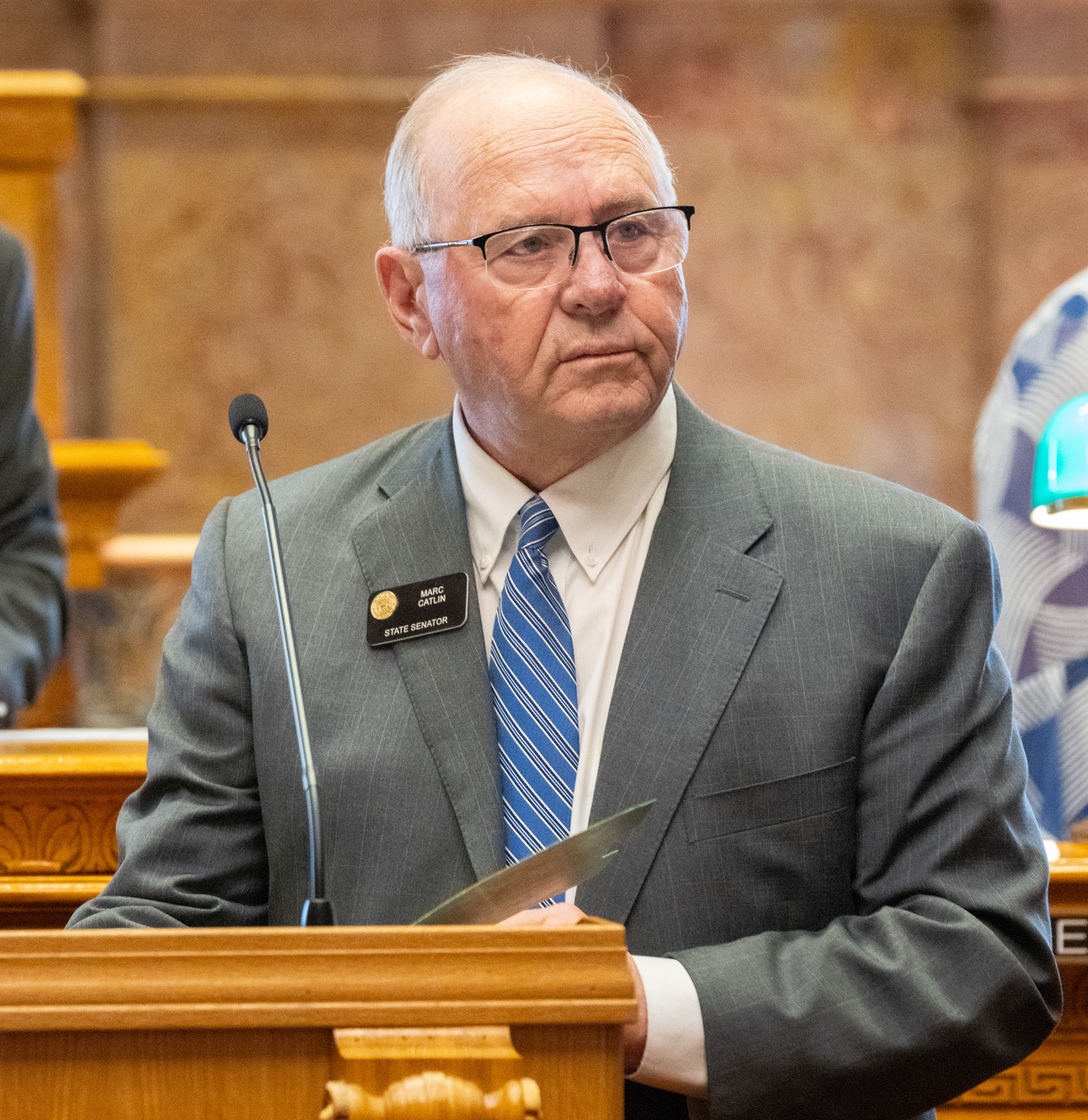

Member of the Colorado Senate from the 5th district
- Incumbent
- Assumed office January 8, 2025
- Preceded by: Perry Will

Member of the Colorado House of Representatives from the 58th district
- In office January 11, 2017 – January 8, 2025
- Preceded by: Don Coram
- Succeeded by: Larry Don Suckla

Personal details
- Party: Republican
- Education: Mesa State College
- Website: https://www.catlinforcolorado.com/

Marc Catlin is an American politician and a Republican member of the Colorado Senate from Montrose, Colorado. He represents Colorado's 5th Senate district which includes all or part of Delta, Eagle, Garfield, Gunnison, Hinsdale, Montrose, and Pitkin counties in western Colorado. Previously, Catlin represented Colorado House of Representatives District 58, which includes all or part of the western Colorado counties of Delta, Dolores, Gunnison, Hinsdale, Montezuma, Montrose, Ouray, and San Miguel.

== Career ==
In 1996, as the assistant manager, Catlin started his career at the Uncompahgre Valley Water Users Association (UVWUA). In 2002, the same year as the 2002 North American drought, Catlin accepted the position of manager of UVWUA. He won the Colorado Division of Water Resources - Division 4 "Water Manager of the year" for his actions during the drought season. Catlin served as President for the Four States Irrigation Council for three consecutive terms: 2001, 2002, and 2003.

In September 26, 2009, Catlin oversaw "The Century of Water Celebration," the one hundred year celebration of the Gunnison Tunnel opening.

On January 5, 2015, Catlin was appointed to represent Montrose County, Colorado on the Colorado River Water Conservation District Board of Directors, more commonly known as the Colorado River District.

On January 11, 2023, the Colorado River District Board of Directors elected Catlin to serve as the Board's Vice-President.

In July 2013, Catlin started a talk-radio program named Diversions Radio, hosted on KUBC 580 AM. Diversions discussed issues regarding agriculture, business, policy, and events happening around the state. The program ran through 2019.

Catlin was elected by the member of the Gunnison Basin Roundtable to serve on the InterBasin Compact Committee (IBCC). In 2005, the Interbasin Compact Committee was formed in same legislation that created the nine permanent basin roundtables, the Colorado Water for the 21st Century Act. Catlin remained on the IBCC for 7 years.

Catlin served as President in 2006 for the Colorado Water Congress.

== Political career ==
On January 8, 2017, the Republican 58th House District Vacancy Committee appointed Catlin to fill the Vacancy caused by the resignation of Don Coram. Coram left the Colorado House District 58 to fulfil the vacant seat of Colorado's 6th Senate district, which was created by the Ellen Roberts' retirement. Catlin was sworn into the Colorado House of Representatives on January 11, 2017, three days after being appointed. He was assigned committee membership to the House Public Health Care & Human Service Committee and the House Finance Committee.

In 2018, Catlin was reassigned from House Public Health Care & Human Service Committee to the House Agriculture, Livestock, & Natural Resources Committee. The same year, Catlin was assigned to the Water Resources Review Committee, an interim committee that studies the conservation, use, development, financing of the water resources of Colorado, and holding hearing on the Colorado State Water Plan.

Term limited in the state house, in 2024 Catlin ran to represent District 5 in the state senate. In the Republican primary election held June 25, 2024, he ran unopposed. In the general election held November 5, 2024, Catlin defeated Democratic candidate Cole Buerger, winning 52.23% of the total votes cast.

== Elections Results ==
2018 General State House District 58 Election
Party	Candidate	Votes	%
Republican	Marc Catlin	21,912	62.8%
Democratic	Seth Cagin	12,972	37.2%

2020 General State House District 58 Election
Party	Candidate	Votes	%
Republican	Marc Catlin	29,424	64.9%
Democratic	Seth Cagin	15,897	35.1%

2022 General State House District 58 Election
Party	Candidate	Votes	%
Republican	Marc Catlin	26,289	56.8%
Democratic	Kevin Kuns	19,996	43.2%

2024 General State Senate District 5 Election
Party	Candidate	Votes	%
Republican	Marc Catlin	46,310	52.2%
Democratic	Cole Buerger	42,357	47.8%
