= Bruce Whitehead =

American politician

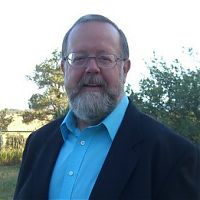

Member of the Colorado Senate from the 6th district
- In office August 17, 2009 – January 12, 2011
- Preceded by: Jim Isgar
- Succeeded by: Ellen Roberts

Personal details
- Born: Fort Collins, Colorado
- Party: Democratic
- Spouse: first name: Becca
- Profession: Engineer

Bruce Whitehead is a legislator in the U.S. state of Colorado. Appointed to the Colorado State Senate as a Democrat in 2009, Whitehead represented Senate District 6, which covers much of south-western Colorado, encompassing Archuleta, Dolores, La Plata, Montezuma, Montrose, Ouray, San Juan, and San Miguel counties, until 2011.

== Biography ==
Senator Bruce Whitehead is a fourth generation Coloradoan born in Fort Collins, Colorado. Senator Whitehead obtained a B.S. in Civil Engineering in 1981 from Colorado State University, and is a licensed Professional Engineer. After working in the Colorado Division of Water Resources office in Alamosa, Colorado he transferred to Durango, Colorado where he served as division engineer for Water District 7 administering water rights in that area of southwestern Colorado. While in Durango he served on the boards of the Animas-La Plata Water Conservancy District, the Colorado Water Conservation District, and as director of the Southwestern Water Conservation District. He was appointed to the Colorado State Senate by Governor Bill Ritter to fill the vacant position of Democrat Jim Isgar. He was sworn in as State Senator for District 6 on August 17, 2009, by Colorado Supreme Court Justice Greg Hobbs. Committee assignments include the Senate Agriculture, Livestock and Natural Resource Committee where he serves as vice-chair. He also serves on the Transportation committee. He also serves on the Interim Water Resources Review Committee, the UMTRA Oversight Committee where he serves as the chair, and was also appointed as the Senate Ag Committee representative on the Inter-Basin Compact Committee (IBCC). Whitehead has an extensive background in Colorado water issues. The latter part of his career with the State of Colorado was in the capacity of Division Engineer for the San Juan River and Dolores River. Prior to his appointment to the Senate, Bruce was a Director on the Colorado Water Conservation Board representing southwestern Colorado. He has retired from the Colorado Division of Water Resources but continues to work part-time for the Southwestern Water Conservation District and is continuing to serve as an Engineer Adviser for the Upper Colorado River Commission.

He and his wife Becca enjoy the arts and the outdoors, and live south of Hesperus near Breen. They are raising two daughters, Isabel and Risa.
