= Dylan Roberts =

American politician and attorney

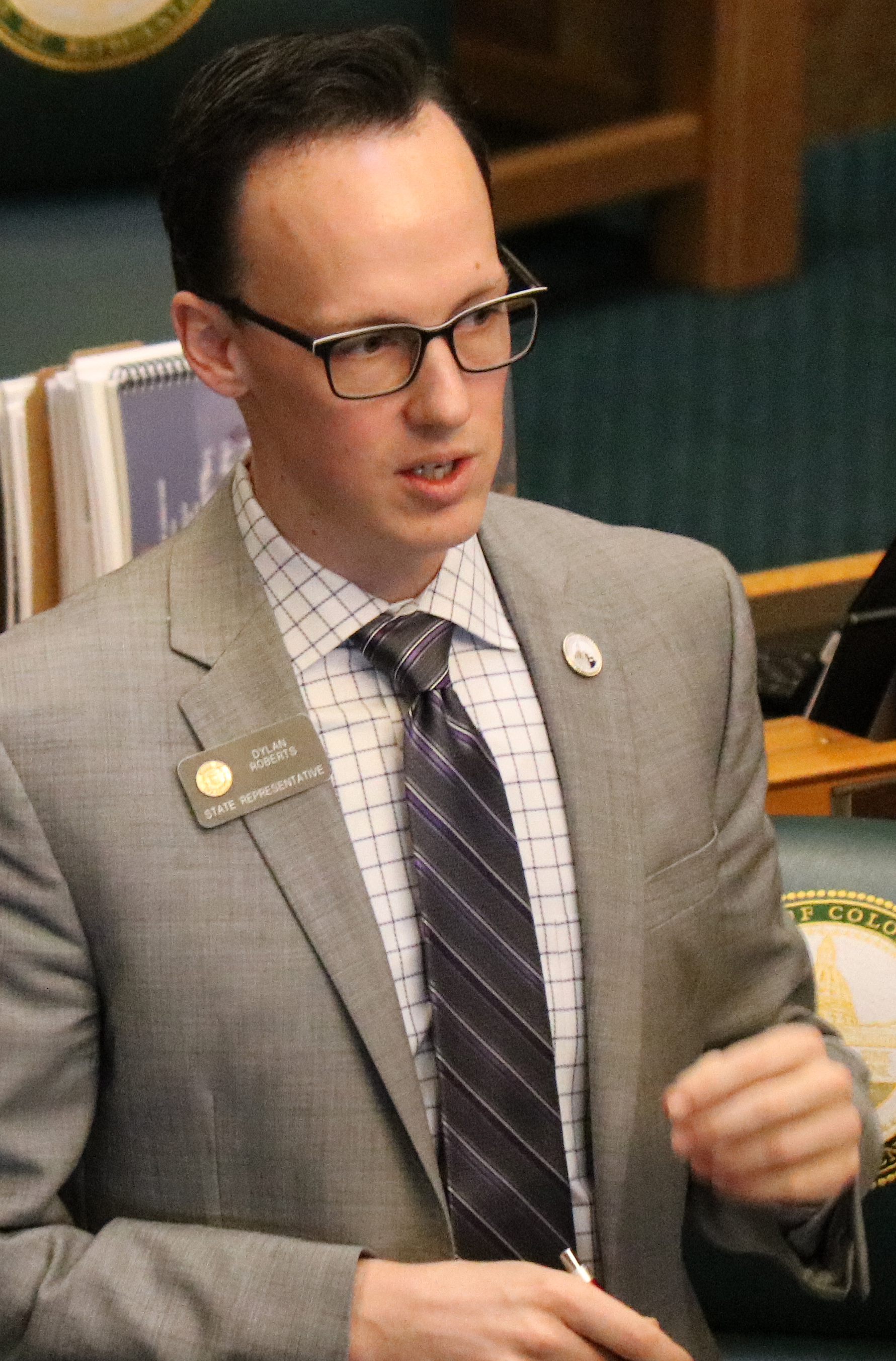

Member of the Colorado Senate from the 8th district
- Incumbent
- Assumed office January 9, 2023
- Preceded by: Bob Rankin

Member of the Colorado House of Representatives from the 26th district
- In office November 13, 2017 – January 9, 2023
- Preceded by: Diane Mitsch Bush
- Succeeded by: Meghan Lukens

Personal details
- Born: July 17, 1989 (age 37) Denver, Colorado, U.S.
- Party: Democratic
- Education: Boston College (BA); University of Colorado (JD)
- Website: Official

Dylan Outerbridge Roberts (born July 17, 1989) is an American politician and attorney who is a Democratic member of the Colorado Senate. He represents District 8, which includes all or part of Clear Creek, Eagle, Garfield, Gilpin, Grand, Jackson, Moffat, Rio Blanco, Routt, and Summit counties, including the communities of Steamboat Springs, Edwards, Craig, Gypsum and Eagle. Previously, from 2017 to 2023, Roberts served in the Colorado House of Representatives and represented the 26th District, which included Eagle and Routt counties. In 2022, Roberts ran for the State Senate and won the race.

== Early life and education ==
Roberts was born on July 17, 1989, in Denver, Colorado, to parents Stu and Lulu Roberts. When he was in the fourth grade, Roberts and his family moved to Steamboat Springs, Colorado.

In 2008, Roberts took a semester off of college to return to his to work for the Barack Obama 2008 presidential campaign. Roberts opened and ran the Steamboat Springs office, the first ever presidential field office in the region. Roberts later returned to Boston College, where he earned his bachelor's degree in political science and environmental studies in 2011. Roberts later graduated the University of Colorado Law School.

== Career ==
After receiving his degree, he returned to Colorado to serve as the deputy state field director for the Barack Obama 2012 presidential campaign. That year, Roberts led over thirty staff members in sixteen offices across twenty-two Colorado counties.

During his legal studies, Roberts worked for state representative Mike Foote as a legislative policy analyst, for the Colorado Attorney General, and as a student attorney representing indigent citizens who were charged with crimes and could not afford an attorney.

Following law school, Roberts moved to Eagle County and now works as Deputy District Attorney for Eagle County. His work includes prosecuting felony and misdemeanor cases on behalf of victims of crime, including domestic violence, theft, and other crimes.

=== Colorado House ===
Roberts was sworn in as a Colorado State Representative on November 13, 2017. During Roberts' first year in the legislature, he was the primary sponsor of twelve bills, six of which were successfully passed and sent to the Governor.

During his second year, Roberts was the primary sponsor of thirty-five bills, twenty-nine of which were passed and signed into law by the governor. During this session, Roberts wrote and passed a first-in-the-nation cap on insulin co-pays that has now passed in many other states.

During the 2020 legislative session, Roberts was the primary sponsor of seventeen bills, eleven of which became law, all with bipartisan support. He was the lead sponsor of a bill to expand the Rural Jump-Start Small Business Program which gives incentives for small businesses to open in rural Colorado.

From 2019-2020, Roberts was the Chair of the House Rural Affairs & Agriculture committee, Chair of the Capital Development Committee, and a member of the House Judiciary Committee.

In 2021, Roberts was appointed Chair of the House Business Affairs & Labor Committee and as a member of the House Agriculture, Livestock & Water Committee and the House Judiciary Committee.

=== Colorado Senate ===
In 2022, Roberts ran in a bid to represent Senate District 8. In the 2022 General elections, he won by a large margin.

== Electoral history ==
2018 Colorado House of Representatives election, 26th District
Party	Candidate	Votes	%
Democratic	Dylan Roberts (incumbent)	20,761	60.38%
Republican	Nicki Mills	12,584	36.60%
Independent	Luke Bray	1,039	3.02%
Total votes		34,384	100%
Democratic hold			

2020 Colorado House of Representatives election, 26th District
Party	Candidate	Votes	%
Democratic	Dylan Roberts (incumbent)	32,059	100.00%
Total votes		32,059	100%
Democratic hold			

2022 Colorado Senate election, 8th District
Party	Candidate	Votes	%
Democratic	Dylan Roberts	40,765	55.70%
Republican	Matt Solomon	32,427	44.30%
Total votes		73,192	100%
Democratic gain from Republican			
