= Al White (politician) =

American politician

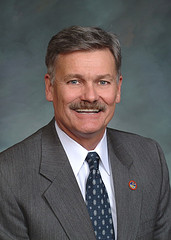
- White in 2008

Member of the Colorado Senate from the 8th district
- In office 2009–2011
- Succeeded by: Jean White

Member of the Colorado House of Representatives from the 57th district
- In office 2001–2009

Personal details
- Born: Albert C. White; June 22, 1950 (age 76) Hillsboro, Illinois, U.S.
- Party: Republican
- Spouse: Jean White
- Profession: Businessman

Albert C. "Al" White (born June 22, 1950) is a Republican former member of the Colorado Senate. He had previously served in the Colorado House of Representatives for eight years, before being elected to the Senate in 2008. He represented District 8 from 2009 through 2011, when he became director of the Colorado Tourism Office, after which the district was represented by his wife, Jean White.

== Biography ==
White was born in Hillsboro, Illinois. He is a businessman who began his time in Winter Park, Colorado, in the 1970s. He and his wife Jean, who now reside in Hayden, have been married for over 36 years, and have two adult children, son, Devin and daughter, Jenna.

After volunteering to serve in the military, White was honorably discharged from the Army and relocated to Colorado where he attended the University of Colorado. White then moved to the mountains of Winter Park and began his career as an entrepreneur in the ski business. White and his wife spent 25 years as owners and operators of several full service ski shops, a bike shop, and a mountain lodge. As an active member of the business community, he served on several bank boards, was the Chairman of the Fraser Valley Metropolitan Recreation District, Secretary of the Grand County Water and Sanitation board, and Vice Chair of the Winter Park Fraser Valley Chamber of Commerce.

== Legislative career ==
During his term in office, White served as Assistant Majority Leader, Vice Chair of the Business Affairs and Labor committee, member of the Agriculture and Natural Resources Committee, and the Education Committee. He also served on the Water Resources Review Committee, and the Legislative Audit committee. He was the House appointee to the Colorado Tourism Office board for the past six years. White served on the Joint Budget Committee. This committee has only three members from the House and three members from the Senate.

In 2011, he vacated his State Senate seat in favor of being appointed as Director of the Colorado Tourism office. White turned out some of the best numbers while in this position from 2011–2015 with a somewhat limited budget.
