= Carl Miller (basketball) =

English basketball player (born 1966)

Personal information
- Born: 25 October 1966 (age 60) Birmingham, England
- Listed height: 6 ft 9 in (2.06 m)
- Listed weight: 226 lb (103 kg)

Career information
- Playing career: 1984–2003
- Position: Power forward

Career history
- 1984–1986: Warrington / Manchester United
- 1990–1991: Manchester Giants
- 1991–1994: Kingston/Guildford Kings
- 1994–1995: Leopards
- 1995–1996: Thames Valley Tigers
- 1996: Estrelas Lisbon
- 1996–1999: Newcastle Eagles
- 1999–2001: Derby Storm
- 2001–2002: Leopards
- 2002–2003: Tees Valley Mohawks

Carl Miller (born 25 October 1966, in Birmingham), is an English former professional basketball player who played in the British Basketball League (BBL), and later the EBL (English Basketball League). He is founder of Esteem Through Sport.

== Basketball career ==
A journeyman for much of his career, Miller played for a number of BBL teams in the UK and had a very brief spell in Europe with the Estrelas Lisbon basketball team where he was released, before returning to the BBL to join the Newcastle Eagles.

The full list of teams Miller played for include:

Tees Valley Mohawks (2002–2003); London Leopards (2001–2002 ); Derby Storm (1999–2001 ); Newcastle Eagles (1996–99); Estrelas Lisbon (Portugal – ) (1996); Thames Valley (1995–96); Leopards (1994–95); Kingston/Guildford Kings (1991–94); Manchester Giants (1990–91); Warrington/Manchester Utd (1984–86)

== Basketball achievements ==
- League (Team): Winner 1991–92, 1985–86; Runner-up – 1984–85
- Championship (Team): Winner – 1991–92, 1984–85; Runner-up – 1993–94
- Cup (Team): Winner – 1992–93, 1991–92; Runner-up – 1993–94
- Trophy (Team): Winner – 1991–92; Runner-up – 1992–93, 1990–91
- International: Great Britain (7 Caps)
