= Colorado's 8th Senate district =

American legislative district

Colorado's 8th State Senate district
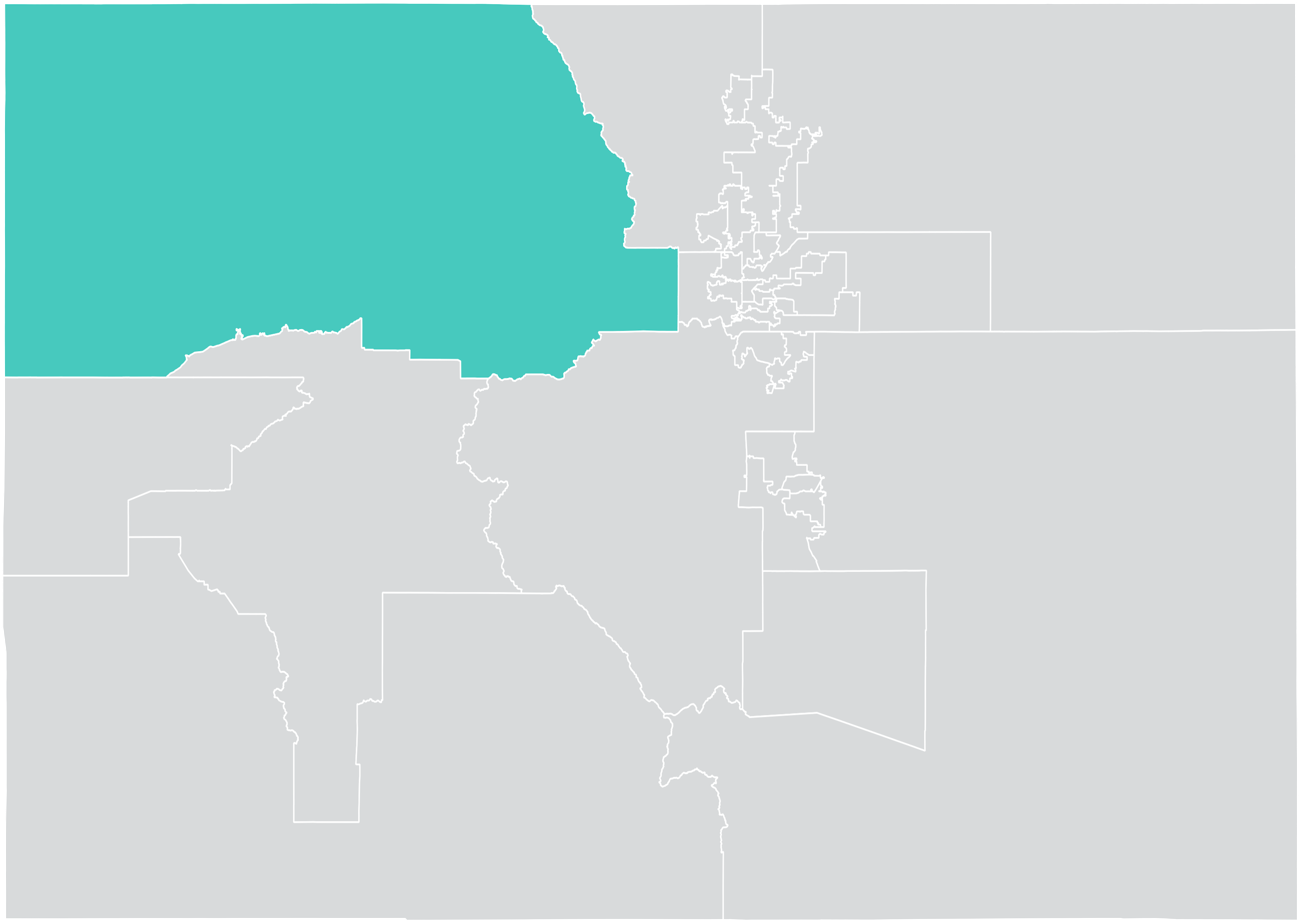
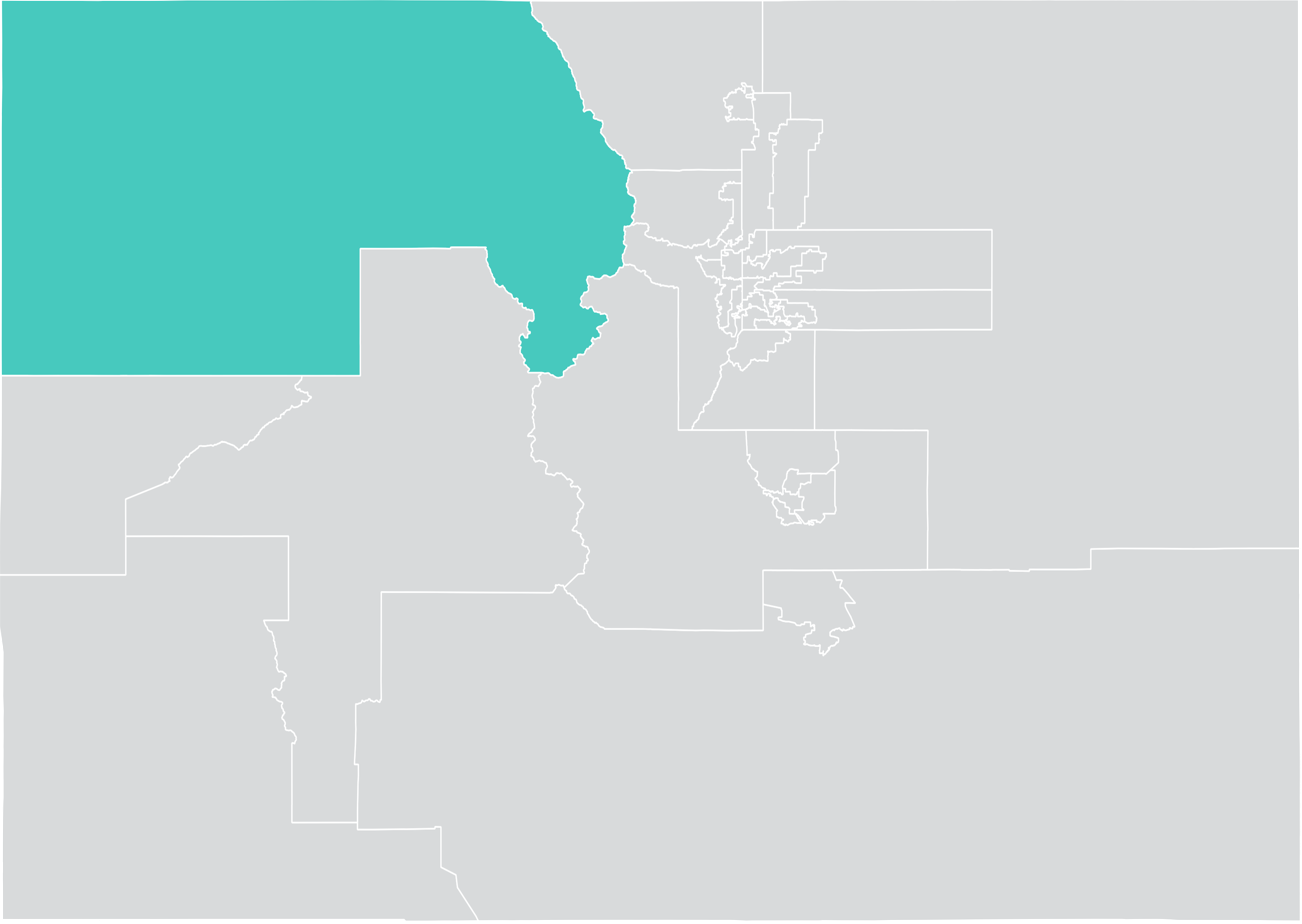
Senator
Dylan Roberts; D–Eagle
- Registration: 24.2% Republican; 21.9% Democratic; 51.6% No party preference
- Demographics: 79% White; 1% Black; 18% Hispanic; 1% Asian; 1% Other
- Population (2018): 149,728
- Registered voters: 111,732

Colorado's 8th Senate district is one of 35 districts in the Colorado Senate. It has been represented by Democrat Dylan Roberts since 2023. Prior to redistricting the district was represented by Republicans Bob Rankin and Randy Baumgardner.

== Geography ==
District 8 is based in the mountain and plains towns of the upper Western Slope, covering all of Garfield, Grand, Jackson, Moffatt, Rio Blanco, Routt, and Summit Counties. Communities in the district include Glenwood Springs, Rifle, Carbondale, New Castle, Silt, Parachute, Battlement Mesa, No Name, Meeker, Rangely, Craig, Steamboat Springs, Hayden, Walden, Fraser, Granby, Kremmling, Breckenridge, Frisco, Silverthorne, and Keystone.

The district overlaps with Colorado's 2nd and 3rd congressional districts, and with the 13th, 26th, 57th, and 61st districts of the Colorado House of Representatives.

== Recent election results ==
Colorado state senators are elected to staggered four-year terms. The old 8th district held elections in presidential years, but the new district drawn following the 2020 Census will hold elections in midterm years.

=== 2022 ===
The 2022 election will be the first one held under the state's new district lines. Incumbent Republican Senator Bob Rankin was redistricted to the 5th district, and State Rep. Dylan Roberts is running to succeed him in the 8th district, which was redrawn to be more friendly to Democrats.

2022 Colorado State Senate election, District 8
Party	Candidate	Votes	%
Democratic	Dylan Roberts	40,765	55.7
Republican	Matt Solomon	32,427	44.3
Total votes		73,192	100

== Historical election results ==
=== 2020 ===
In 2017 and 2018, a sexual harassment claim was made against Senator Randy Baumgardner, which he denied. Baumgardner survived an expulsion vote in April 2018, but ultimately resigned in January 2019 after further allegations came to light. Then-State Rep. Bob Rankin was chosen by a Republican vacancy committee to replace him, beating out former State Rep. Gregg Rippy and several other candidates. Rankin won his first full term in 2020.

2020 Colorado State Senate election, District 8
Primary election
Party	Candidate	Votes	%
Republican	Bob Rankin (incumbent)	11,805	63.2
Republican	Debra Irvine	6,873	36.8
Total votes		18,678	100
Democratic	Karl Hanlon	10,847	55.8
Democratic	Arn Menconi	8,584	44.2
Total votes		19,431	100
General election
Republican	Bob Rankin (incumbent)	42,701	50.6
Democratic	Karl Hanlon	41,717	49.4
Total votes		84,418	100
Republican hold			

=== 2016 ===
2016 Colorado State Senate election, District 8
Party	Candidate	Votes	%
Republican	Randy Baumgardner (incumbent)	39,526	54.9
Democratic	Emily Tracy	32,530	45.1
Total votes		72,056	100
Republican hold			

=== 2012 ===
2012 Colorado State Senate election, District 8
Primary election
Party	Candidate	Votes	%
Republican	Randy Baumgardner	6,809	58.2
Republican	Jean White (incumbent)	4,887	41.8
Total votes		11,696	100
General election
Republican	Randy Baumgardner	34,187	51.1
Democratic	Emily Tracy	29,688	44.3
Libertarian	Sacha Weis	3,079	4.6
Total votes		66,954	100
Republican hold			

=== Federal and statewide results ===
Year	Office	Results
2020	President	Biden 51.6 - 45.8%
2018	Governor	Polis 50.5 – 46.0%
2016	President	Trump 48.2 – 43.7%
2014	Senate	Gardner 50.2 – 44.5%
2014	Governor	Beauprez 48.4 – 47.2%
2012	President	Romney 50.1 – 47.5%
