= Colorado's 6th Senate district =

American legislative district

Colorado's 6th State Senate district
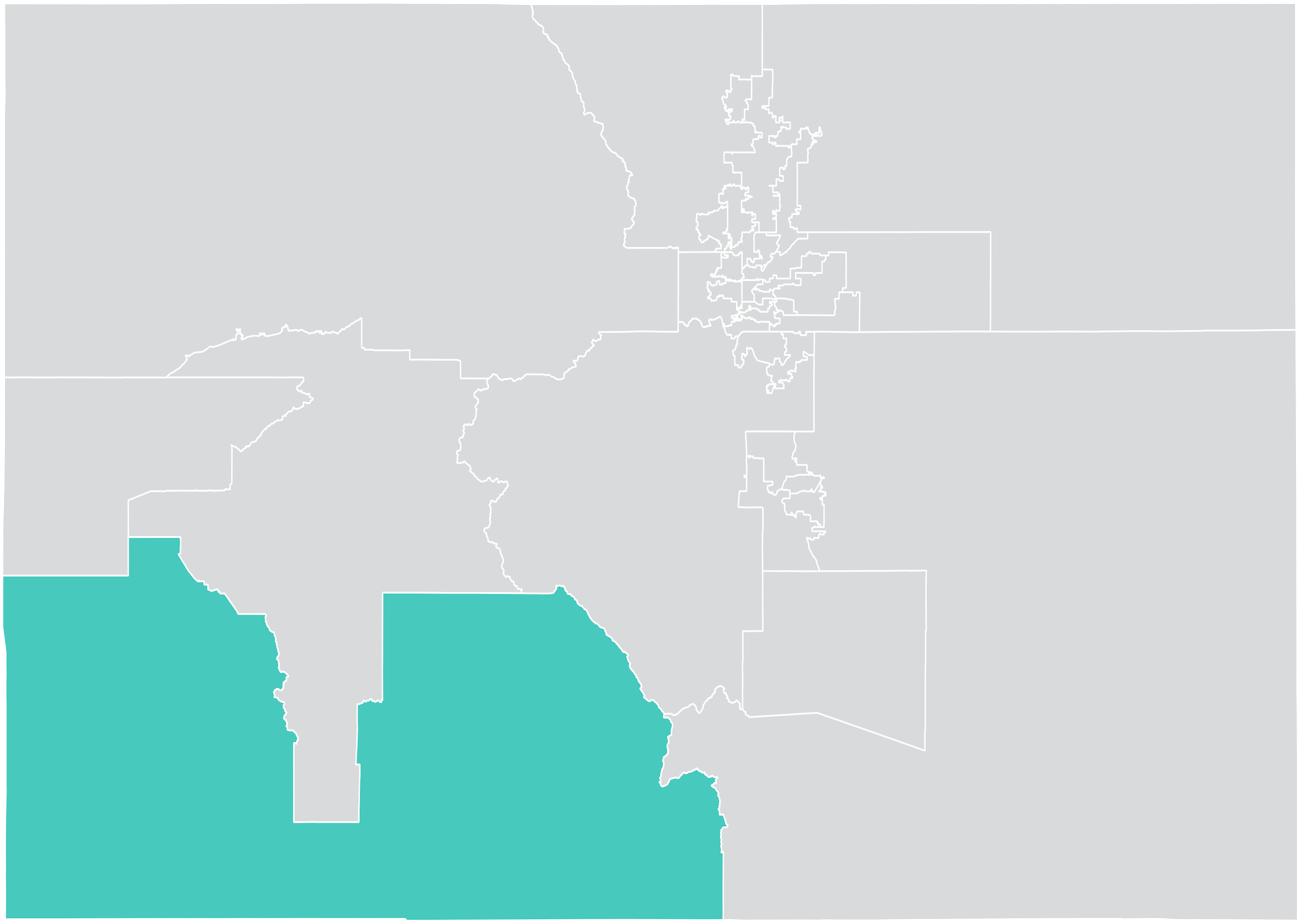
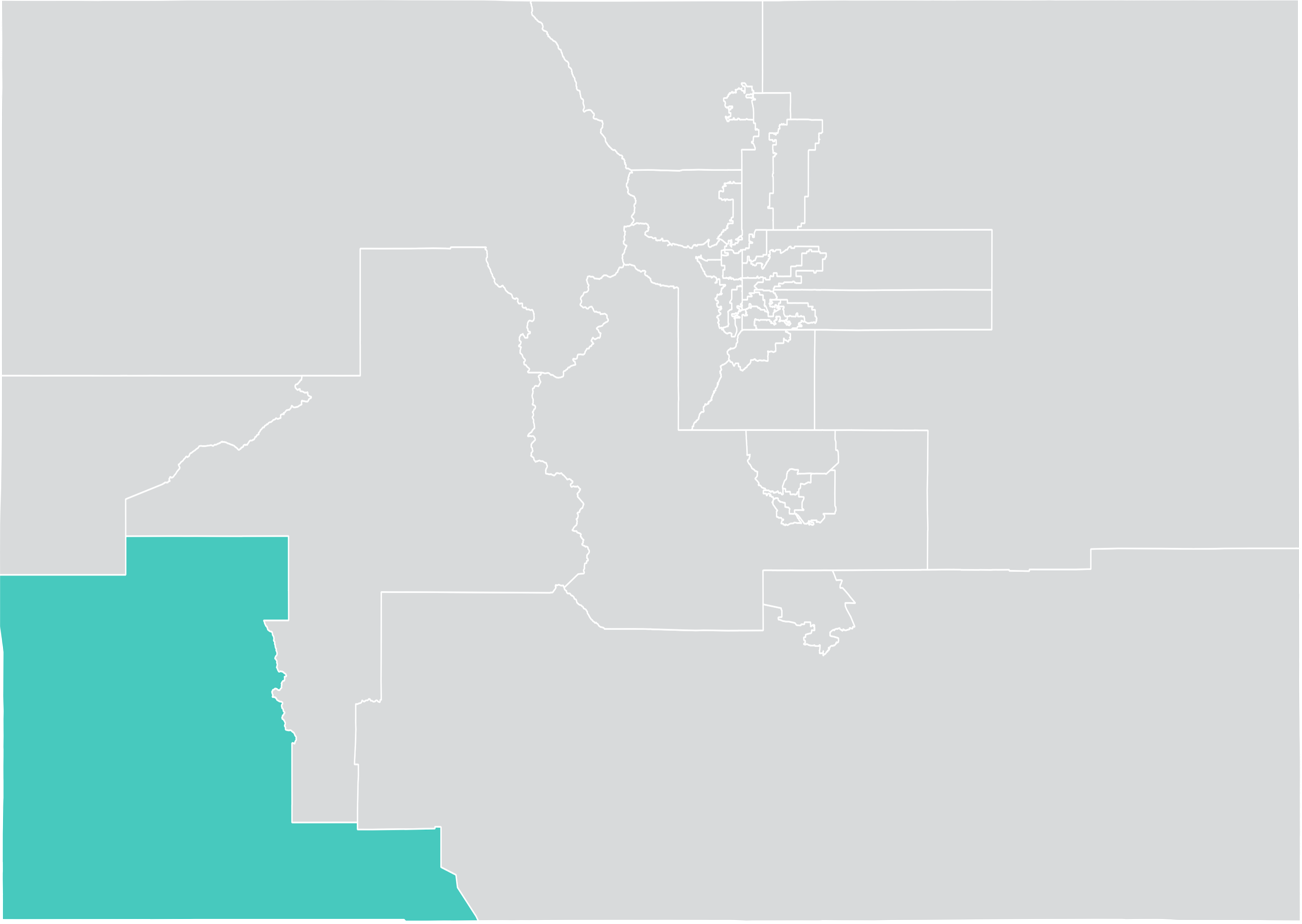
Senator
Cleave Simpson; R–Alamosa
- Registration: 27.5% Republican; 22.7% Democratic; 47.6% No party preference
- Demographics: 78% White; 0% Black; 15% Hispanic; 1% Asian; 4% Native American; 2% Other
- Population (2018): 150,261
- Registered voters: 119,874

Colorado's 6th Senate district is one of 35 districts in the Colorado Senate. It has been represented by Republican Cleave Simpson since 2023. Prior to redistricting the district was represented by Republicans Don Coram and Ellen Roberts.

== Geography ==
District 6 is based in Southwest Colorado, covering all of Alamosa, Archuleta, Conejos, Costilla, Dolores, La Plata, Mineral, Montezuma, Montrose, Ouray, Rio Grande, Saguache, San Juan, and San Miguel Counties. Communities in the district include Montrose, Olathe, Ouray, Mountain Village, Telluride, Silverton, Dove Creek, Cortez, Mancos, Towaoc, Durango, Bayfield, and Pagosa Springs. The district is also home to the Southern Ute Indian Reservation.

The district is located entirely within Colorado's 3rd congressional district, and overlaps with the 58th and 59th districts of the Colorado House of Representatives. It borders the states of Utah, New Mexico, and – via Four Corners – Arizona.

== Recent election results ==
Colorado state senators are elected to staggered four-year terms. The old 6th district held elections in midterm years, but the new district drawn following the 2020 Census will hold elections in presidential years.

Incumbent Senator Don Coram was redistricted into the 5th district, which also is not up for election this year, meaning Coram had no seat to run in; he ran unsuccessfully for Colorado's 3rd congressional district instead. 35th district Senator Cleave Simpson lives in the new boundaries of the 6th district, and will represent it beginning in 2023.

=== 2018 ===
2018 Colorado State Senate election, District 6
Party	Candidate	Votes	%
Republican	Don Coram (incumbent)	40,088	54.7
Democratic	Guinn Unger Jr.	33,208	45.3
Total votes		73,296	100
Republican hold			

=== 2014 ===
2014 Colorado State Senate election, District 6
Party	Candidate	Votes	%
Republican	Ellen Roberts (incumbent)	43,482	100
Total votes		43,482	100
Republican hold			

=== Federal and statewide results ===
Year	Office	Results
2020	President	Trump 51.3 – 46.4%
2018	Governor	Stapleton 50.9 – 46.0%
2016	President	Trump 52.0 – 39.8%
2014	Senate	Gardner 54.6 – 40.9%
2014	Governor	Beauprez 51.8 – 43.1%
2012	President	Romney 53.3 – 43.9%
