= Jim Isgar =

American politician

Member of the Colorado Senate from the 6th district
- In office 2001 – July 19, 2009
- Preceded by: Jim Dyer
- Succeeded by: Bruce Whitehead

Personal details
- Born: May 5, 1951 Durango, Colorado
- Died: March 4, 2016 (aged 64) Denver, Colorado
- Party: Democratic

Jim Isgar (May 5, 1951 – March 4, 2016) was an American politician who served in the Colorado Senate from the 6th district from 2001 to 2009.

He died of leukemia on March 4, 2016, in Denver, Colorado at age 64.
