= Leadville North, Colorado =

Unincorporated community in Colorado, US

- Census-designated place
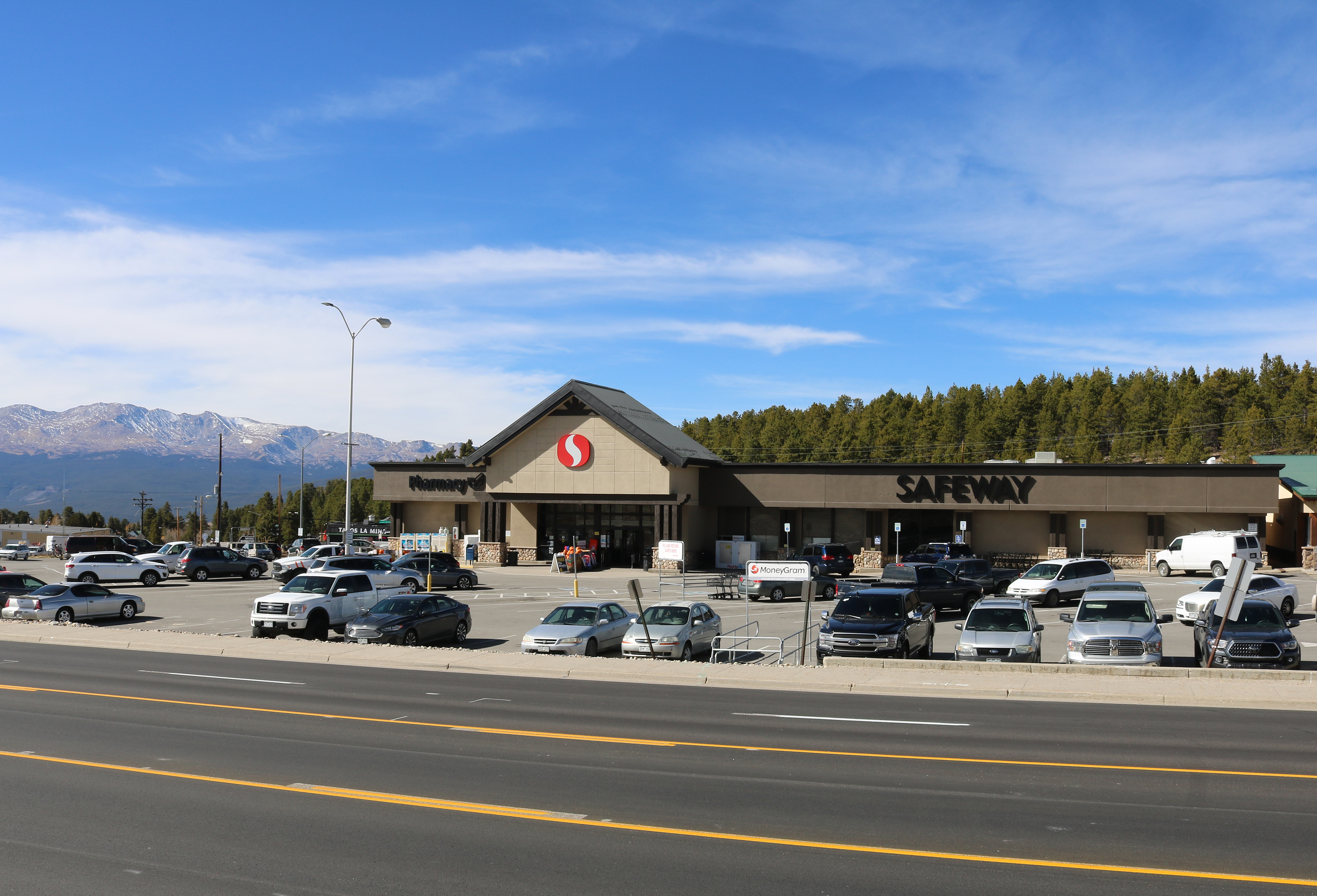
- A grocery store in Leadville North.

- Location of the Leadville North CDP in Lake County, Colorado
- Coordinates: 39°15′20″N 106°18′39″W
- Country: United States
- State: Colorado
- County: Lake

Government
  - Type: Unincorporated community

Area
  - Total: 2.449 sq mi (6.343 km^{2})
  - Land: 2.449 sq mi (6.343 km^{2})
  - Water: 0 sq mi (0.000 km^{2})
- Elevation: 9,991 ft (3,045 m)

Population (2020)
  - Total: 1,892
  - Density: 772.5/sq mi (298.3/km^{2})
- Time zone: UTC-7 (MST)
  - Summer (DST): UTC-6 (MDT)
- ZIP Code: Leadville 80461
- Area code: 719
- GNIS feature ID: 2408593

Leadville North is a census-designated place (CDP) in and governed by Lake County, Colorado, United States. The population of the Leadville North CDP was 1,892 at the 2020 United States census. The Leadville post office (Zip Code 80461) serves the area.

== Geography ==
Leadville North is bordered to the south by the City of Leadville, the county seat.

U.S. Route 24 forms the eastern edge of the community. The highway leads north 31 miles (50 km) over the Continental Divide to Interstate 70 (I-70) at Minturn, and it runs south through Leadville 35 miles (56 km) to Buena Vista. Colorado State Highway 91 has its southern terminus in Leadville North and leads north-northeast 22 miles (35 km) to I-70 at Copper Mountain.

The Leadville North CDP has an area of 1,567 acres (6.343 km^{2}), all land.

== Demographics ==
Leadville North CDP, Colorado
Year	Pop.	±%
1970	1,717	—
1980	1,851	+7.8%
1990	1,757	−5.1%
2000	1,942	+10.5%
2010	1,794	−7.6%
2020	1,892	+5.5%
Source: United States Census Bureau

The United States Census Bureau initially defined the Leadville North CDP for the 1970 United States census.

=== 2020 census ===
As of the 2020 census, Leadville North had a population of 1,892. The median age was 35.7 years. 19.7% of residents were under the age of 18 and 13.5% of residents were 65 years of age or older. For every 100 females, there were 121.8 males, and for every 100 females age 18 and over, there were 130.5 males age 18 and over.

84.9% of residents lived in urban areas, while 15.1% lived in rural areas.

There were 791 households in Leadville North, of which 26.2% had children under the age of 18 living in them. Of all households, 45.4% were married-couple households, 29.6% were households with a male householder and no spouse or partner present, and 14.9% were households with a female householder and no spouse or partner present. About 26.2% of all households were made up of individuals, and 7.2% had someone living alone who was 65 years of age or older.

There were 916 housing units, of which 13.6% were vacant. The homeowner vacancy rate was 0.8% and the rental vacancy rate was 1.3%.

Racial composition as of the 2020 census
Race	Number	Percent
White	1,325	70.0%
Black or African American	8	0.4%
American Indian and Alaska Native	31	1.6%
Asian	15	0.8%
Native Hawaiian and Other Pacific Islander	3	0.2%
Some other race	242	12.8%
Two or more races	268	14.2%
Hispanic or Latino (of any race)	589	31.1%

== See also ==
- List of census-designated places in Colorado
