= Carl Miller (politician) =

American politician (1938–2025)

Member of the Colorado House of Representatives
- In office 1996–2004

Personal details
- Born: October 28, 1938 Leadville, Colorado, U.S.
- Died: August 9, 2025 (aged 86)
- Party: Democratic

Carl Eugene Miller (October 28, 1938 – August 9, 2025) was an American politician. He served in the Colorado House of Representatives. He represented the counties of Summit, Lake and Eagle.

== Life and career ==
Miller was involved in establishing the National Mining Hall of Fame. He served 12 years as a commissioner in Lake County, Colorado. He served in the Colorado House of Representatives from 1996 to 2004.

Miller died on August 9, 2025, at the age of 86.
