= Don Coram =

American politician (born 1948)

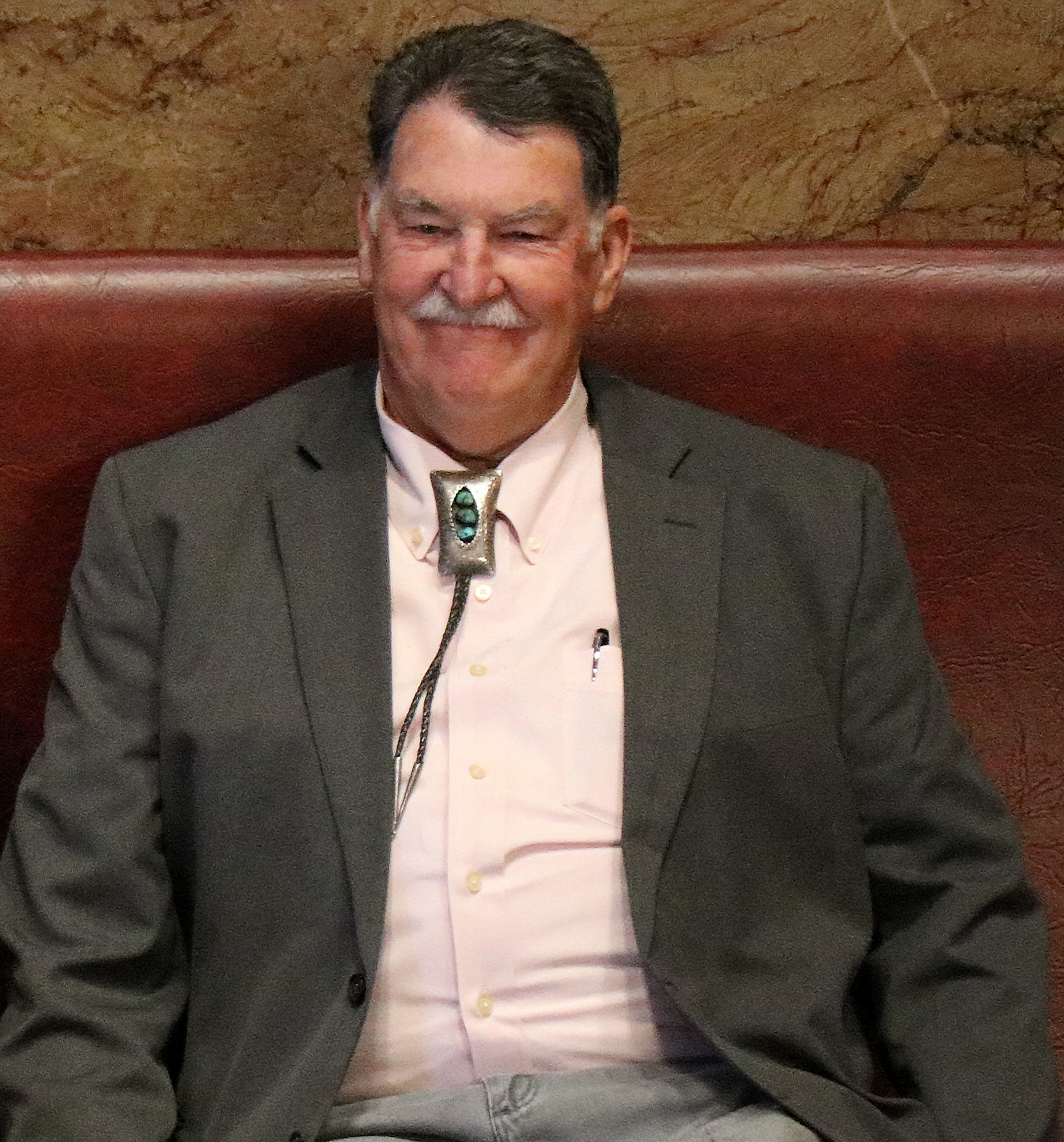

Member of the Colorado Senate from the 6th district
- In office January 11, 2017 – January 9, 2023
- Preceded by: Ellen Roberts
- Succeeded by: Cleave Simpson (Redistricted)

Member of the Colorado House of Representatives from the 58th district
- In office January 12, 2011 – January 11, 2017
- Preceded by: Scott Tipton
- Succeeded by: Marc Catlin

Personal details
- Born: 1948 or 1949 (age 77–78) Montrose, Colorado, U.S.
- Party: Republican
- Website: Official website

Don Coram (born 1948) is an American politician who served as a member of the Colorado Senate and the Colorado House of Representatives. In the state senate, he represented District 6, comprising the counties of Archuleta, Dolores, La Plata, Montezuma, Montrose, Ouray, San Juan, and San Miguel. In the Colorado House of Representatives he represented District 58 from January 2011 to January 2017. In 2022, Coram ran against Lauren Boebert in the Republican primary for Colorado's 3rd congressional district. On June 28, 2022, Boebert defeated Coram by 31 points.

== Career ==
Coram operates a hemp farm and coffee shop.

Prior to his time in the Legislature, Coram served on board of the Montrose County School District. In the Colorado House of Representatives, Coram succeeded Scott Tipton, who was elected to the United States House of Representatives.

After former State Senator Ellen Roberts resigned at the end of 2016, a vacancy committee elected Coram to serve for the remainder of her term. He resigned as state representative and was sworn in as a state senator on January 11, 2017.

A supporter of marijuana legalization and LGBT rights, Coram has been characterized as a moderate Republican.

Coram sponsored a bill during the 2021 session of the Colorado General Assembly that would require the Colorado Department of Education to modify existing academic standards to address civics education, including the "history, culture, and social contributions” of ethnic, racial, and religious minority groups, to assure that students acquire an understanding of "how laws are enacted at the federal, state, and local government levels,” and to inform students about “the methods by which citizens shape and influence government and governmental actions.” SB21-067 is a bipartisan measure, co-sponsored in the Colorado State Senate by Chris Hansen of Denver and in the Colorado House of Representatives by Barbara McLachlan and Terri Carver.

== Elections ==
- 2022: Coram announced his run for the Republican nomination in Colorado's 3rd congressional district. Other candidates include incumbent representative Lauren Boebert and crane operator Marina Zimmerman. On June 28, 2022, he lost the election 65.31% to 34.69% to Boebert.
- 2012: Coram ran unopposed for the June 26, 2012 Republican Primary, winning with 6,757 votes, and won the three-way November 6, 2012 General election with 22,071 votes (62.1%) against Democratic nominee Tammy Theis and Libertarian candidate Jeff Downs.
- 2010: When District 58 Republican Representative Scott Tipton ran for the United States House of Representatives and left the District 58 seat open, Coram was unopposed for the August 10, 2010 Republican Primary, winning with 8,701 votes, and won the November 2, 2010 General election with 20,275 votes (64.4%) against Democratic nominee James Perrin.
