= Bob Rankin =

American politician (born 1942)

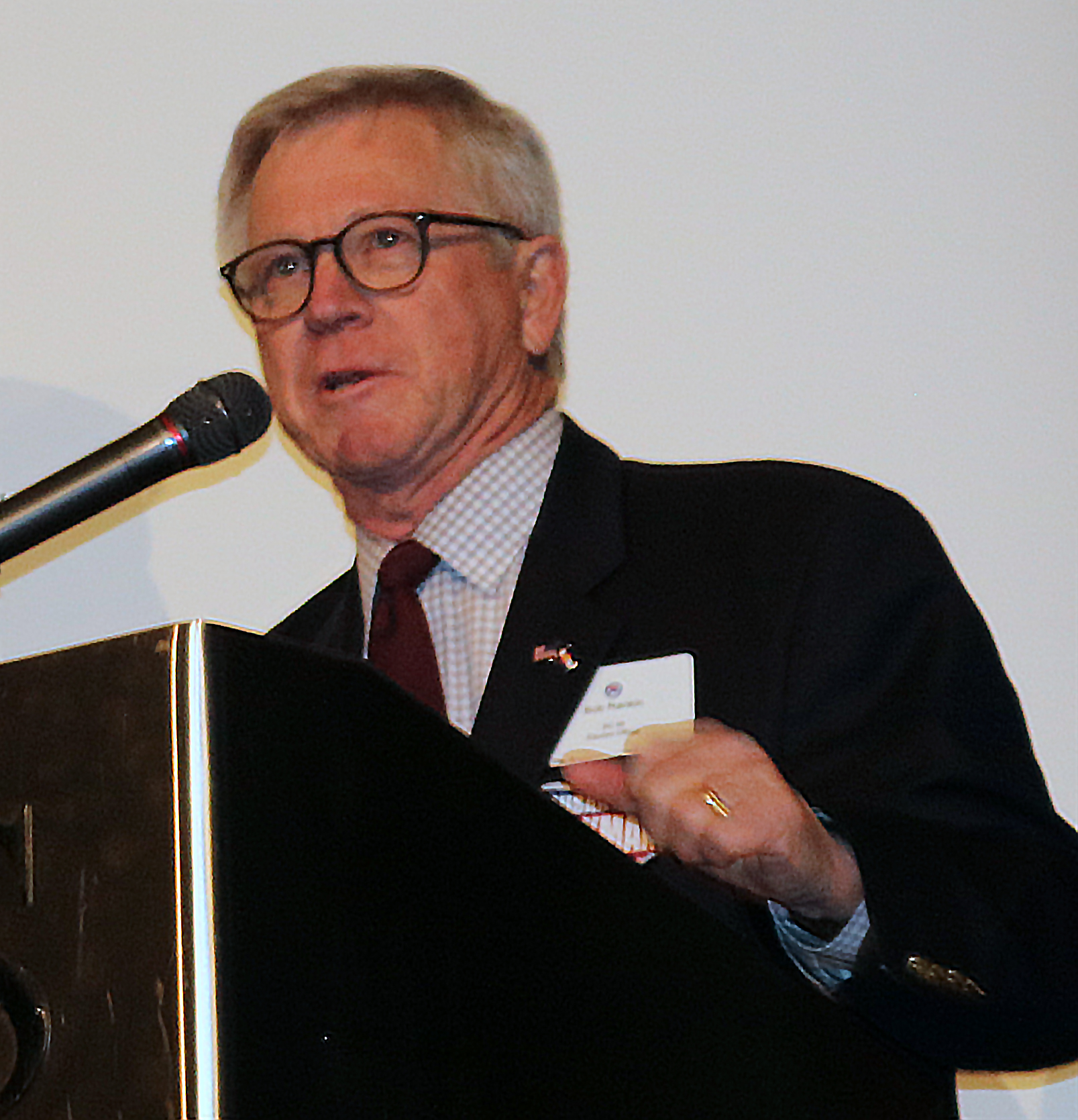
- Rankin in 2019

Member of the Colorado Senate from the 5th district
- In office January 9, 2023 – January 10, 2023
- Preceded by: Redistricted
- Succeeded by: Perry Will

Member of the Colorado Senate from the 8th district
- In office January 22, 2019 – January 9, 2023
- Preceded by: Randy Baumgardner
- Succeeded by: Redistricted

Member of the Colorado House of Representatives from the 57th district
- In office January 9, 2013 – January 21, 2019
- Preceded by: Randy Baumgardner
- Succeeded by: Perry Will

Personal details
- Born: 1942 (age 83–84)
- Party: Republican
- Website: votebobrankin.com

Robert E. Rankin (born 1942) is an American politician who served as a Republican member of the Colorado State Senate for the 8th district (and briefly the 5th) from 2019 until his resignation on January 10, 2023. He was initially appointed to the State Senate by a vacancy committee in January 2019 after the resignation of Randy Baumgardner.

Previously, Rankin served in the Colorado House of Representatives representing District 57 from January 9, 2013, to January 21, 2019.

On December 1, 2022, Rankin announced that he was resigning from the State Senate. The resignation took effect on the second day of the 2023 Colorado General Assembly session, January 10, 2023. A Republican vacancy committee selected former state representative Perry Will to complete Rankin's term.

== Personal life ==
Family

Wife: Joyce Rankin

Education

Graduated, Electrical Engineering, Mississippi State University

Professional Experience

- Vice President/General Manager, Ford Aerospace Corporation
- Served as Officer, United States Army
- Chief Executive Officer/Founder, Interactive Outdoors, Incorporated, 2000-2005

== Elections ==
Bob Rankin electoral history

2010 Colorado State Senate 5th District Election
Party	Candidate	Votes	%	±%
Democratic	Gail Schwartz (incumbent)	26,355	51.1%	
Republican	Bob Rankin	25,269	49.9%	
Total votes		51,624	100.00%	

2012 Colorado House of Representatives 57th district election
Party	Candidate	Votes	%	±%
Republican	Bob Rankin	18,223	56.9%	
Democratic	Jo Ann Baxter	12,434	38.8%	
Libertarian	Dan Enright	1,393	4.3%	
Total votes		32,050	100.00%	

2014 Colorado House of Representatives 57th district election
Party	Candidate	Votes	%	±%
Republican	Bob Rankin (incumbent)	18,218	77.0%	
Libertarian	Sacha Mero	5,431	23.0%	
Total votes		23,649	100.00%	

2016 Colorado House of Representatives 57th district election
Party	Candidate	Votes	%	±%
Republican	Bob Rankin (incumbent)	26,002	100%	
Total votes		26,002	100%	

2018 Colorado House of Representatives 57th district election
Party	Candidate	Votes	%	±%
Republican	Bob Rankin (incumbent)	19,691	62.1%	
Democratic	Colin Wilhelm	12,016	37.9%	
Total votes		31,707	100%	

2020 Colorado Senate District 8 Republican Primary
Party	Candidate	Votes	%	±%
Republican	Bob Rankin (incumbent)	11,805	63.2%	
Republican	Debra Irvine	6,873	36.8%	
Total votes		18,678	100%	

2020 Colorado Senate District 8 Election
Party	Candidate	Votes	%	±%
Republican	Bob Rankin (incumbent)	42,701	50.6%	
Democratic	Karl Hanlon	41,717	49.4%	
Total votes		84,418	100%	
