= Dan Gibbs =

American politician (born c.1976)

Executive Director of the Colorado Department of Natural Resources
- Incumbent
- Assumed office February 5, 2019
- Governor: Jared Polis
- Preceded by: Bob Randall

Board of County Commissioners of Summit County from the 1st district
- In office January 11, 2011 – January 16, 2019
- Preceded by: Bob French
- Succeeded by: Elisabeth Lawrence

Member of the Colorado Senate from the 16th district
- In office December 11, 2007 – January 12, 2011
- Preceded by: Joan Fitz-Gerald
- Succeeded by: Jeanne Nicholson

Member of the Colorado House of Representatives from the 56th district
- In office January 10, 2007 – December 11, 2007
- Preceded by: Gary Lindstrom
- Succeeded by: Christine Scanlan

Personal details
- Party: Democratic
- Profession: Outdoor guide, legislative assistant

Dan Gibbs (born c. 1976) is a politician in the U.S. state of Colorado. He currently serves as the executive director of the Colorado Department of Natural Resources.

Gibbs worked as an outdoor guide and as a staffer for U.S. Representative Mark Udall before being elected to the Colorado House of Representatives as a Democrat in 2006. In the legislature, Gibbs was noted for his focus on transportation and environment issues in the state legislature, particularly in response the fire dangers posted by Colorado's mountain pine beetle epidemic — Gibbs is a volunteer wildland firefighter and has served fighting fires in Colorado and California.

Gibbs was appointed to a vacancy in the Colorado State Senate in late 2007, won election to a Senate term of his own in 2008, and represented a multi-county region stretching from the Colorado Front Range near Boulder into Rocky Mountain ski country west of Denver. Gibbs rose quickly to chair the Colorado Senate's Transportation Committee, but announced that he would seek election to a Summit County Commissioner seat in 2010 rather than run for another term in the legislature. Gibbs was elected a Summit County Commissioner in 2010 and served in that office until he resigned in January 2019.

== Biography ==
Gibbs' parents were both public school teachers and later school principals; they divorced when Gibbs was young and he split his childhood between Gunnison, Colorado and East Lansing, Michigan. He was influenced at an early age toward public service after meeting former U.S. President Jimmy Carter. Gibbs earned a bachelor's degree in sociology from Western State College, and then attended the University of Colorado at Denver, where he worked towards a graduate degree in political science.

Gibbs has worked in the timber industry, as a manager with a whitewater rafting company in Lake Luzerne, New York, and as an outdoor adventure guide in Gunnison, Colorado. As a local businessperson, he was a member of and diplomat for the Summit Chamber of Commerce, and was elected to their board for a three-year term in 2006.

An athlete and outdoorsman, Gibbs has competed in marathon and ultramarathon running races (including the Leadville Trail 100) and helped coach the Battle Mountain High School cross-country skiing team. He has also volunteered with Habitat for Humanity, Eagle River Clean Up, and the I-70 Clean Up Team, and sat on the boards of Club 20, the High Country Conservation Center, the Vail-Eagle Valley Rotary Club, and Vail Valley Hospital Home Health/Hospice. He has cited being a volunteer youth mentor with the Buddy Mentors program as his most meaningful volunteer experience.

Gibbs worked in the Washington, DC office of U.S. Congressman Mark Udall before becoming the director for Udall's Western Slope office in Minturn in 2003. As a Congressional staffer, Gibbs sat on the Congressional Legislative Staff Association Board of Directors. He also helped launch the Summit County Young Democrats in 2004.

== Legislative career ==
=== 2006 election ===
Gibbs first ran for the state legislature in 2006 for a seat being vacated by Gary Lindstrom, who served as his campaign chair. Running for office at the age of 30, Gibbs faced criticism for his relative youth and inexperience, however, spending over $90,000 on his campaign — more than twice as much as Republican opponent Ken Chlouber, — Gibbs ultimately defeated Chlouber by a 2:1 margin. His constituency, House District 56, encompassed Eagle, Lake and Summit Counties, including the skiing communities of Vail and Breckenridge.

=== 2007 legislative session ===
In his first year in the legislature — the 2007 session of the Colorado General Assembly — Gibbs sat on the House Agriculture, Livestock and Natural Resources Committee and was Vice-Chair of the House Transportation and Energy Committee. That same year, Gibbs was also appointed to the Colorado Interbasin Water Compact Committee and the board of directors of the Colorado Tourism office.

Starting when he was a staffer for Congressman Udall and continuing into his legislative career, Gibbs promoted increased government assistance on forest management issues, particularly in response to the increased fire danger caused by mountain pine beetle infestations. In the legislature, Gibbs sponsored legislation which established the Colorado Community Forest Restoration grant program, setting aside $1 million for projects to reduce fire risks. The bill was signed into law by Gov. Bill Ritter and ultimately yielded $176,000 for forest restoration projects within Gibbs' district. Following the legislative session, in order to better understand issues surrounding forest wildfires, Gibbs trained for and received certification in wildland firefighting, becoming certified Type II Wildland Firefighter with Lake Dillon Fire-Rescue. Gibbs' first deployment as a volunteer firefighter was to assist fighting the Santiago Fire during the October 2007 California wildfire epidemic.

After successfully sponsoring a 2007 bill requiring collaboration between the Colorado Oil and Gas Commission and Colorado Division of Wildlife to minimize the impact on wildlife from oil and gas drilling, Gibbs testified before the U.S. House's Natural Resources committee on cooperative efforts between oil and environmental interests.

After initial resistance, Gibbs also successfully pushed legislation in 2007 to increase penalties for truck drivers who fail to comply with Colorado's law requiring snow chain on roads in winter, a move designed to improve accessibility and safety on I-70, which bisected Gibbs' house district. In later years, Gibbs and state officials attributed decreases in accidents and tickets issued for violating the chain law to the passage of the bill. Gibbs was named to the interim Transportation Legislation Review Committee at the end of the 2007 regular session.

=== 2007 senate appointment ===
Following the resignation of Colorado Senate President Joan Fitz-Gerald in November 2007, Gibbs was unanimously elected by a vacancy committee to take her seat in the Colorado State Senate. He resigned from the House of Representatives at 9 a.m. on Tuesday, December 11, 2007, and was sworn into the Colorado State Senate an hour later to represent Senate District 16, which covers Clear Creek Gilpin, Grand, Summit and portions of western Boulder and Jefferson counties. Because of his interim appointment, Gibbs faced an election in November 2008 to retain his new Senate seat. Christine Scanlan was appointed to fill Gibbs' vacant house seat on December 19, 2007.

=== 2008 legislative session ===
In his first year in the Colorado State Senate, Gibbs sat on the Senate Agriculture, Livestock, Natural Resources and Energy Committee and the Senate Transportation Committee — the counterparts of both of the House committees he served on — and was named vice-chair of the Senate Judiciary Committee. He also co-chaired the General Assembly's Sportsmen's Caucus.

During the 2008 session, Gibbs sponsored a total of 26 bills as either the lead sponsor or the Senate sponsor of a House bill. Twenty-two of his bills were passed — an average of more than one per week during the legislative session — including:

- the Colorado Forest Restoration Act, a reauthorization of Gibbs' 2007 house bill to provide funds for local forest restoration projects through 2012, cosponsored with Rep. Christine Scanlan;
- the Workplace Accommodations for Working Mothers Act, which requires employers to provide accommodations for breastfeeding mothers;
- the Firefighter Protection Act, which would grant additional legal protections for firefighters;
- a bill clarifying rules regarding sales of gaming machines;
- a bill to prohibit soft drinks from being sold at public schools,
- a bill lowering the blood alcohol limit for boat operators.
- a bill allowing water boards to issue bonds for fire-mitigation projects.

Several of Gibbs bills failed in committee, including legislation to provide $10 million in tax incentives for the film industry in Colorado. With Rep. Scanlan, Gibbs was a prominent opponent of several proposals to charge tolls along the I-70 mountain corridor within his district; he later cited this as his most significant accomplishment of the session.

In response to Gibbs' efforts to advance understanding of the ongoing bark beetle epidemic, Colorado Gov. Bill Ritter signed an executive order in February 2008 creating the Colorado Forest Health Advisory Council; Gibbs was named to the 24-member panel shortly after its creation. Following the legislative session, Gibbs was also named the chairman of an interim legislative committee to study wildfire issues, but was criticized by Republicans for delaying the start of the committee's work. The following day, Gibbs announced plans for the committee's first meeting.

In July 2008, Gibbs was a prominent critic of Denver Water's sudden closure of the Lake Dillon Dam Road for security reasons. Shortly after the road was reopened, Gibbs and Rep. Christine Scanlan announced plans for legislation to prevent future unilateral closures and to encourage cooperation between agencies to share vulnerability assessments and emergency plans

=== 2008 election ===
In the 2008 general election, Gibbs faced Republican Don Ytterberg, whom he had outraised roughly $80,000 to $50,000 by mid-October. Gibbs cited his track record of passing legislation and his connections and experience at the state capitol as part of his case for re-election, and named wildfire and business concerns as his major priorities for a continued term in the Colorado Senate. He also called for reducing business personal property taxes and growing local small businesses. Gibbs' re-election bid was endorsed by the Denver Post, the Summit Daily News, and the Boulder Daily Camera, the Arvada Press, and the Golden Transcript. Gibbs raised over $100,000 during his campaign to Ytterberg's $60,000, and ultimately won re-election with about 59 percent of the vote, taking three-quarters of votes cast in Summit County, but losing narrowly to Ytterberg in suburban Jefferson County.

=== 2009 legislative session ===
In the 2009 session of the Colorado General Assembly, Gibbs rose to chair the Senate Transportation Committee and sat on the Senate Agriculture and Natural Resources Committee.

Gibbs missed some of the opening ceremonies of the 2009 General Assembly after being called to help fight a wildfire near Boulder, Colorado; his absence was cited by Gov. Ritter during the governor's "State of the State" address. With Rep. Christine Scanlan, Gibbs travelled to Washington DC in February and in June to lobby for resources to deal with Colorado's mountain pine beetle epidemic.

Gibbs was the Senate sponsor of a major transportation proposal, introduced by Rep. Joe Rice and backed by Gov. Bill Ritter and other Democratic leaders, to increase transportation funding by $250 million per year, primarily for road and bridge repair, by increasing a range of vehicle registration fees. The proposal, labeled "FASTER," an acronym for Funding Advancement for Surface Transportation and Economic Recovery, stalled in the state senate, but advanced after a compromise was reached to drop a pilot program to charge drivers based on vehicle miles travelled and to allow locally authorized toll roads. and eventually passed out of the legislature, FASTER was passed without the support of Republicans, who objected to the level of fee increases and called for resources besides fees to be used to support transportation. The increased registration fees drew significant protest from the public when they took effect in July 2009.

Other legislation sponsored by Gibbs included bills to extend Colorado's habitat stamp program, to create a specialty license plate for skiing and snowboarding, to overhaul regulations on oil and gas drilling operations, and to facilitate local planning and fundraising for fighting wildfires.

Gibbs was also viewed as one of the crucial swing votes on a measure to repeal the death penalty in Colorado and use the resulting savings to fund a statewide cold case unit. Although he first voted to remove the death penalty repeal from the legislation, he later voted in support of a version of the bill containing the repeal, which came within one vote of passing the legislature on the final day of the session.

In January 2009, Gibbs was named one of the Western Colorado Conservation Corps' Legislators of the Year, and in May 2009, he was the keynote speaker at Summit High School's graduation.

=== 2010 election ===
In November 2009, Gibbs announced that, rather than running for re-election to the state senate in fall of 2010, he would run for the Summit County Commissioner seat being vacated by Bob French. Gibbs's retirement opened up a seat that Republicans viewed as a pickup opportunity.

In 2014, Gibbs discussed his preference for local politics: “At the state level, it’s much more about whether you are a Republican or a Democrat and winning and losing, rather than making decisions that are good for Colorado. The more dysfunctional things get at the federal and state levels, the more people seem to come together at the local level to accomplish goals that are important to communities.”

In November 2014, he defeated Republican Allen Bacher, winning re-election by over 66 percent of the vote.

== Department of Natural Resources ==
On January 9, 2019, Governor Jared Polis nominated Gibbs to serve as the executive director of Colorado's Department of Natural Resources. Following his service in the Colorado General Assembly, Gibbs served on the Board of County Commissioners of Summit County, Colorado. Gibbs was first elected as county commissioner in 2010 and was sworn in during 2011. He resigned as county commissioner in January 2019 and was confirmed by the state senate and sworn in as Department of Natural Resources executive director on February 5, 2019. During his tenure, Gibbs, a certified wildland firefighter, worked in his firefighter role on the 2020 Grizzly Creek Fire.
