= Chad Clifford =

American politician

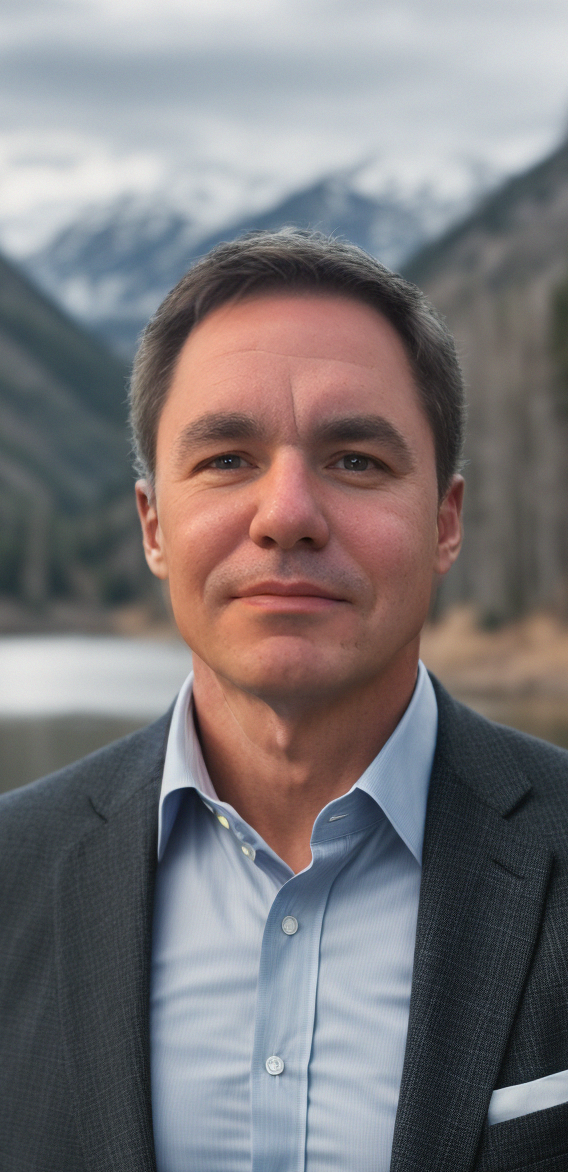
- Clifford in 2023

Member of the Colorado House of Representatives from the 37th district
- Incumbent
- Assumed office January 3, 2024
- Preceded by: Ruby Dickson

Personal details
- Party: Democratic
- Occupation: Business owner, police officer, emergency manager, lobbyist
- Website: chadforcolorado.com General Assembly page

Chad Clifford is an American politician. A member of the Democratic Party, he has served in the Colorado House of Representatives since January 2024, representing the 37th district. He was appointed by a vacancy committee to succeed Ruby Dickson, who resigned in late 2023, won a full term in the 2024 election, and was re-elected in 2026. He currently serves as Co-Chair of the House Democratic Caucus. The district, in Arapahoe County, includes Centennial, Foxfield, Greenwood Village, southern Aurora and unincorporated areas including Dove Valley. Dove Valley is home to Broncos Park, the headquarters and training facility of the Denver Broncos, and to Centennial Airport, which its operator describes as the busiest general aviation airport in the United States.

== Career ==
Clifford owns and operates businesses, including a security alarm company. He founded the Creating Leaders PAC, which supports Democratic candidates. Before entering the legislature, he worked in emergency management as a government operations lead for the American Red Cross and as a registered lobbyist, including for the Colorado Rangers, a statewide law enforcement agency. He is a police officer with the Colorado Rangers, where he serves as a lieutenant and the agency's State Emergency Operations Director.

== Colorado House of Representatives ==
=== Appointment ===
Ruby Dickson resigned the District 37 seat after the November 2023 special session, citing the "sensationalistic and vitriolic" nature of the chamber. On January 3, 2024, an Arapahoe County Democratic vacancy committee chose Clifford to fill the seat. Of the committee's 49 members, 41 attended; on the first ballot, educator Ashish Vaidya received 20 votes, Clifford 19 and Kevin Biehl 2, and Clifford won the second ballot 22–19. He was nominated by state senator Tom Sullivan of Centennial.

=== Elections ===
Clifford was unopposed in the June 2024 Democratic primary. The Republican nominee, Danny Moore, withdrew before the general election, and Clifford won the November 2024 election with 97.3 percent of the vote against unaffiliated write-in candidate Kevin Biehl. In 2026 he was unopposed in the Democratic primary and defeated Republican Jill Thompson in the November 3, 2026, general election with 25,410 votes (61.5 percent) to Thompson's 15,903 (38.5 percent), according to unofficial results as of November 13, 2026.

=== Committee assignments ===
As of the 2026 session, Clifford serves as vice chair of the House State, Civic, Military, and Veterans Affairs Committee and is a member of the House Judiciary Committee and the Capitol Building Advisory Committee. He also chairs the Legislative Oversight Committee Concerning Colorado Jail Standards, which maintains the state's jail standards, reviews reports from the Jail Standards Advisory Committee and recommends legislation on jail standards and operations.

=== Legislation ===
From 2024 through the 2026 session, Clifford sponsored 83 bills, 60 of which became law.

==== Law enforcement accountability ====
Clifford has sponsored several measures on police oversight. After a 2024 bill to protect officers who report misconduct by colleagues failed on its final House vote, he took part in an interim working group chaired by Representative Jennifer Bacon that met with law enforcement officials, whistleblowers and victims' advocates through the second half of 2024 to draft replacement legislation, including due-process rules for adding officers to the state's Peace Officer Standards and Training (POST) database. The group's work produced a package of bills negotiated with police chiefs, sheriffs and rank-and-file officers.

Two of those bills became law in 2025. HB25-1031, sponsored by Bacon and Clifford, created a civil cause of action for peace officers who suffer retaliation after reporting conduct they reasonably believe violates a law or policy, with remedies including reinstatement, back pay and damages, and a two-year statute of limitations; it expanded the definition of retaliation beyond firing and demotion to include suspension, reduced hours, a hostile work environment and damaging performance ratings. The bill was supported by the Colorado Fraternal Order of Police. Clifford argued that officers in large departments such as Denver's already had strong civil-service protections, while those at smaller agencies did not. HB25-1136, on which Clifford was the lead House sponsor, overhauled the POST Board's peace officer conduct database. It required agency heads to certify the accuracy of misconduct reports, fined agencies that failed to report, barred settlements that prevent reporting, gave the POST Board subpoena power over discipline records, and gave officers the right to a show-cause hearing and an appeal of their inclusion. Clifford said the database meant that an officer who was a "bad actor" in one department could no longer be hired elsewhere without the record following them. The bill passed the House 42–21 and the Senate 28–7 and was signed on May 31, 2025.

In 2026, Clifford and Senator Kyle Mullica sponsored HB26-1312, which restructured the POST Board to add line officers and representatives of training academies and reserve officers while reducing the number of agency heads; barred people whose certification has been revoked from serving on the board or teaching at academies; set a minimum age of 21 for certified peace officers; and directed the attorney general to propose updated academy training standards by 2030. It passed the House 54–9 and the Senate 29–6 and was signed on June 3, 2026.

Clifford initially opposed Proposition 130, a 2024 ballot measure directing the legislature to provide $350 million for local law enforcement recruitment, training and retention and a $1 million death benefit for families of officers killed on duty. He called it fiscally irresponsible to commit state general-fund money to a local function during a budget shortfall, while agreeing that the funding was needed because nearly every agency in the state faced staffing problems. After voters approved the measure, he worked on implementation proposals. In January 2025 he said the legislature would likely phase the money in over seven to ten years, and at a town hall that month he said the proposals he was working on spread it over seven years. The implementation bill, SB25-310, became law in 2025 and phases the funding in at about $35 million a year over ten years.

==== Criminal justice and corrections ====
Clifford has said he wants the Colorado Department of Corrections to better prepare people leaving prison so that they do not return. In 2024 he sponsored HB24-1432, which repealed the fee the Colorado Bureau of Investigation charged for sealing criminal justice records; it was signed into law on May 15, 2024. In 2025 he was the House sponsor of SB25-155, which created the Legislation Inside Advisory Council, through which legislators meet regularly with incarcerated people to hear their views on corrections policy; he described the program as a way for lawmakers to get feedback on reducing recidivism, and the bill became law.

In 2025 Clifford was the House prime sponsor, with Senator Julie Gonzales, of HB25-1214, "Appropriate Use of Prison Beds". As amended in committee, the bill would have required a court sending someone convicted of a class 5 or 6 felony, or a level 3 or 4 drug felony, to the Department of Corrections to find that incarceration was the most suitable option. It would also have required the department to notify the sentencing court when an offender arrived already past, or within 90 days of, their parole eligibility date, so that the court could hold a reconsideration hearing and impose an alternative sentence such as community corrections or treatment, and it created a presumption of parole for some low-risk offenders. Nonpartisan legislative staff estimated that about 449 people a year are sentenced to the department within their parole eligibility date, and that the bill would reduce the prison population by about 143 people and save the state about $16.6 million over five years. Presenting the bill to the House Judiciary Committee, Clifford said it was aimed at the lowest-risk offenders and would give judges and the parole board more options, including halfway houses and community programs; witnesses testified that people serving short sentences often move between county jails, the Denver Reception and Diagnostic Center and prison facilities without staying long enough to be connected with treatment. The Colorado Association of Chiefs of Police and victim advocates testified against the bill. It passed the Judiciary (7–4), Finance (7–6) and Appropriations (6–5) committees, but it was laid over daily on second reading in the House from April 21, 2025, and died without a floor vote when the session adjourned.

Clifford has pressed the Department of Corrections over errors in the risk assessments it uses to set supervision levels for parolees. After a 9News investigation in April 2025 found repeated errors in the assessments of parolees who went on to commit violent crimes, including a man rated low risk eight days before a homicide, Clifford and Republican Representative Matt Soper called for the state to examine how the scores were being set; Clifford called it "a really scary problem". In late 2025 the department acknowledged "unacceptable" inaccuracies and pledged to overhaul the process, and 9News reported that legislators were drafting legislation to hold it to that pledge. When an internal review found errors in 44 of 45 scores checked, Clifford told a February 2026 legislative hearing that lawmakers were angry and that the problem had to be fixed quickly; the department then announced it would re-examine more than 1,700 parolee risk assessments.

==== Disability rights ====
With Representative David Ortiz, Clifford was a House prime sponsor of HB24-1360, which created the Colorado Disability Opportunity Office within the Colorado Department of Labor and Employment as a permanent statewide coordinating office on disability policy, funded by historic license plate fees; the bill became law.

In 2025, Clifford was a lead sponsor of HB25-1017, which he called the most important bill he was carrying that session. The law wrote the 1999 Olmstead v. L.C. decision, which held that unjustified institutionalization of people with disabilities is discrimination under the Americans with Disabilities Act, into Colorado law, so that the protections would remain in effect regardless of future federal court rulings. It also directed the new Disability Opportunity Office to write an updated state community integration plan by 2028, replacing a plan that had not been updated in more than a decade. The bill followed a 2024 settlement between Colorado and the United States Department of Justice over the state's Olmstead obligations, and passed with bipartisan support.

In 2026 he was a prime sponsor of HB26-1045, which added definitions of service animals and emotional support animals as "assistance animals" to the Colorado Anti-Discrimination Act, keeping housing protections for emotional support animals in state law after the United States Department of Housing and Urban Development narrowed its enforcement.

==== Workers and consumers ====
Clifford and Republican Senator Larry Liston sponsored HB24-1324, aimed at "training repayment agreement provisions" (TRAPs), contracts under which employers bill workers for training if they leave. Clifford described a pet store employee who was promised free training and was later billed $5,000 and reported to a credit bureau, and said many non-professional jobs used such agreements to trap people in employment, while noting they were appropriate in fields such as law enforcement. The law treats recoverable training costs as consumer debt, gives the attorney general authority to write rules on them, and requires that the training be transferable to other employers before costs can be recovered. Attorney General Phil Weiser's office supported the bill, which was signed on May 31, 2024.

==== Housing and taxes ====
Clifford was a sponsor of the two main construction defect reform bills of his first two sessions, which aimed to make it easier for builders of condominiums and other for-sale multifamily housing to obtain insurance. SB24-106, carried by Senators Rachel Zenzinger and James Coleman and Representative Shannon Bird, did not pass in 2024; HB25-1272, carried by Bird and Representative Andrew Boesenecker, became law in 2025. Speaking in support of HB25-1272, he called it a critical fix that would let insurers cover contractors who want to build ownable housing, and said condominium projects approved in his city had been held up for years because builders could not get insurance.

During the August 2024 special session on property taxes, Clifford was the sole prime sponsor of HB24B-1004, which would have cut property taxes for homes valued under $550,000 while raising them on higher-valued homes; the bill did not pass. In 2026 he sponsored SB26-053, extending eligibility for Colorado Housing and Finance Authority mortgage programs to first responders.

==== Traffic safety ====
Clifford and Senator Dylan Roberts sponsored SB26-035, which grew out of conversations with emergency medical crews in Grand County after a series of fatal head-on crashes on mountain highways. The law raised the penalty for illegally passing in a no-passing zone from four to six license points, created escalating penalties for repeat speeding offenses and for "super speeders" caught driving more than 100 mph, and directed the Colorado Department of Transportation to prioritize signage in high-crash areas. It passed with bipartisan support and was signed on May 27, 2026.

Clifford also sponsored HB26-1329 with Republican Representative Chris Richardson, which would have created escalating penalties for stunt driving and made organizing or taking part in a coordinated street takeover a class 6 felony, with fines, license suspension and possible vehicle impoundment. The bill died in the House Judiciary Committee after opponents argued its definitions were broad enough to target cultural groups such as lowrider clubs; Clifford responded that nothing in the bill singled out any group. After a large street takeover in downtown Denver in late summer 2026, he said existing law did not adequately describe such events and that he expected to bring a version of the bill back in the next session.

==== Legislator and court security ====
In 2026, Clifford sponsored HB26-1422 with Senate President James Coleman and Senator Lisa Frizell after the 2025 killing of Minnesota legislator Melissa Hortman. The law created a legislative security administrator position to coordinate lawmakers' personal security with the Colorado State Patrol, added elected officials, legislative staff and judges to the state's definition of protected persons whose home addresses may not be published online, and raised a court fee to fund courthouse security grants.

==== Other legislation ====
In the 2026 session, twelve measures on which Clifford was a House prime sponsor were signed into law. Others included SB26-104, requiring key boxes at schools; and HB26-1038, on county commissioner redistricting. In 2025 he also sponsored HB25-1181, concerning the Colorado Rangers shared law enforcement reserve, and SB25-172, allowing uncontested special district elections to be cancelled; both became law.

=== Political positions ===
Clifford has named affordable housing as the top issue in his district. He has supported reforming Colorado's construction defect law to encourage condominium and other high-density for-sale housing, and has said that increasing supply is a higher priority than rent control. He has also cited public safety, community-oriented policing and reducing recidivism among his priorities. He has described himself as a strong supporter of home rule for municipalities. At a January 2025 town hall in Greenwood Village, he said he had voted against HB24-1313, a 2024 bill on housing in transit-oriented communities, after working to remove provisions he said would have harmed the city; he also said middle-income for-sale housing was the most important housing need in the area.

== Electoral history ==
2026 Colorado House of Representatives election, District 37 (unofficial results as of November 13, 2026)
Party	Candidate	Votes	%
Democratic	Chad Clifford (incumbent)	25,410	61.51
Republican	Jill Thompson	15,903	38.49
Total votes		41,313	100.0
Democratic hold			

2024 Colorado House of Representatives election, District 37
Party	Candidate	Votes	%
Democratic	Chad Clifford (incumbent)	31,463	97.3
Unaffiliated	Kevin Biehl	861	2.7
Total votes		32,324	100.0
Democratic hold			
