= John Andrews (Colorado politician) =

American politician

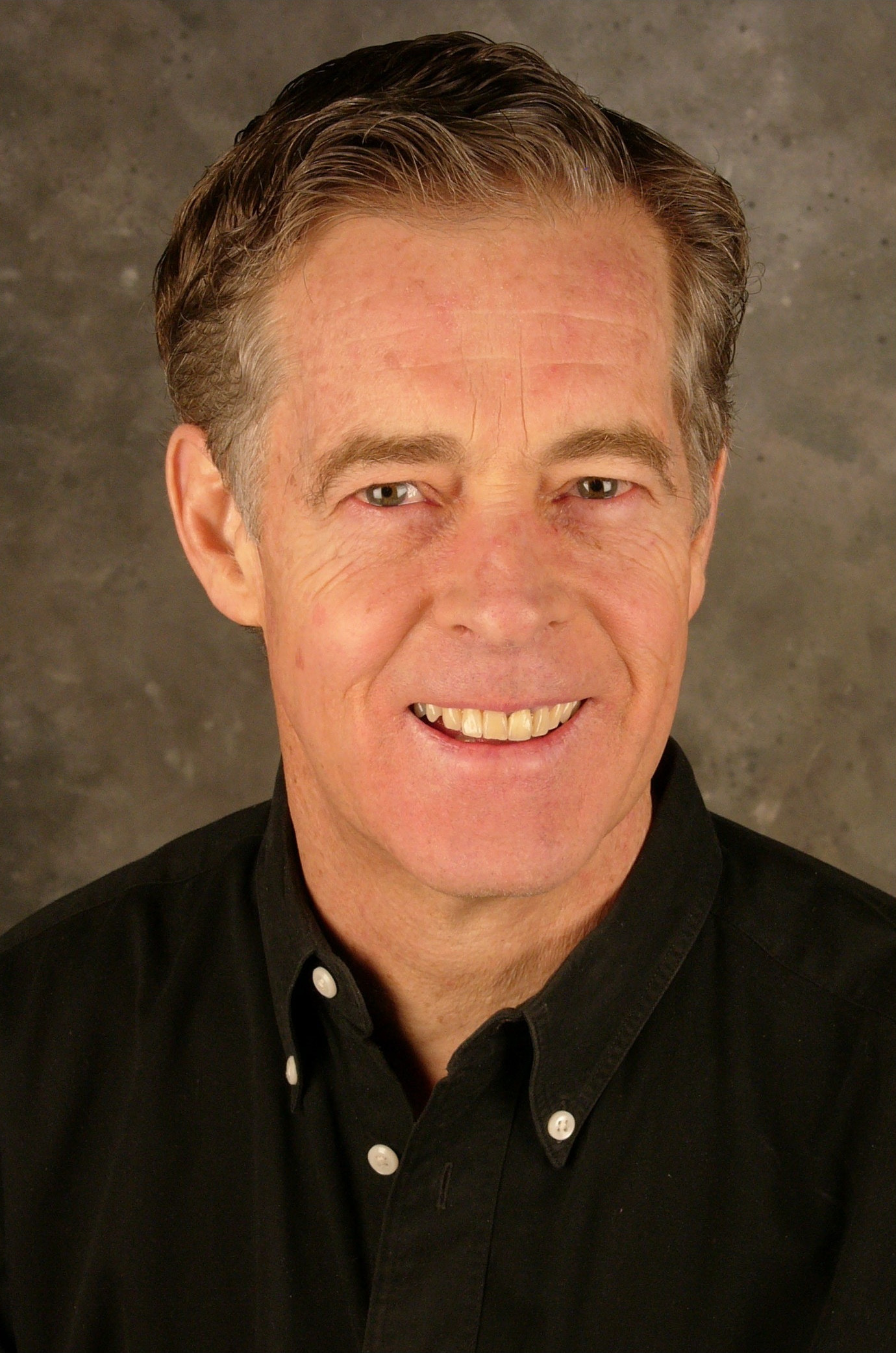
- Andrews in 2013

President of the Colorado Senate
- In office January 8, 2003 – January 12, 2005
- Preceded by: Stan Matsunaka
- Succeeded by: Joan Fitz-Gerald

Member of the Colorado Senate from the 27th district
- In office January 6, 1999 – January 12, 2005
- Preceded by: Mike Coffman
- Succeeded by: Nancy Spence

Personal details
- Born: May 1, 1944 (age 82) Allegan, Michigan, U.S.
- Party: Republican
- Spouse: Donna
- Children: 3
- Education: Principia College (BA)

John Andrews (born May 1, 1944) is an American former Republican politician and conservative activist who served as a Colorado state senator from 1998 to 2005, and Senate President from 2003 to 2005.

Andrews previously served at the national level as a presidential speechwriter for Richard Nixon, making the only public protest resignation from the White House staff during Watergate, and as an education appointee by Ronald Reagan and George W. Bush. He was the Republican nominee for Governor of Colorado in 1990, founder and president of the Independence Institute, chairman of the State Policy Network, the director of TCI Cable News, the original host of Backbone Radio, editor of Imprimis at Hillsdale College, and a senior executive with two Christian ministries.

A familiar voice in Colorado TV, radio, and newspaper commentary, he is also the author of Responsibility Reborn: A Citizen's Guide to the Next American Century (2011) and Backbone Colorado USA: Dispatches from the Divide (2015). From 2009 until his retirement in 2015, he was the director of the Centennial Institute, which hosts the Western Conservative Summit.

== Personal life ==
Andrews was born on May 1, 1944 in Allegan, Michigan, and grew up in Buena Vista, Colorado. He served as a US Navy submarine officer after graduating from Principia College in 1966. His wife is Donna, and they have three grown children and a grandson.

== Legislative achievements ==
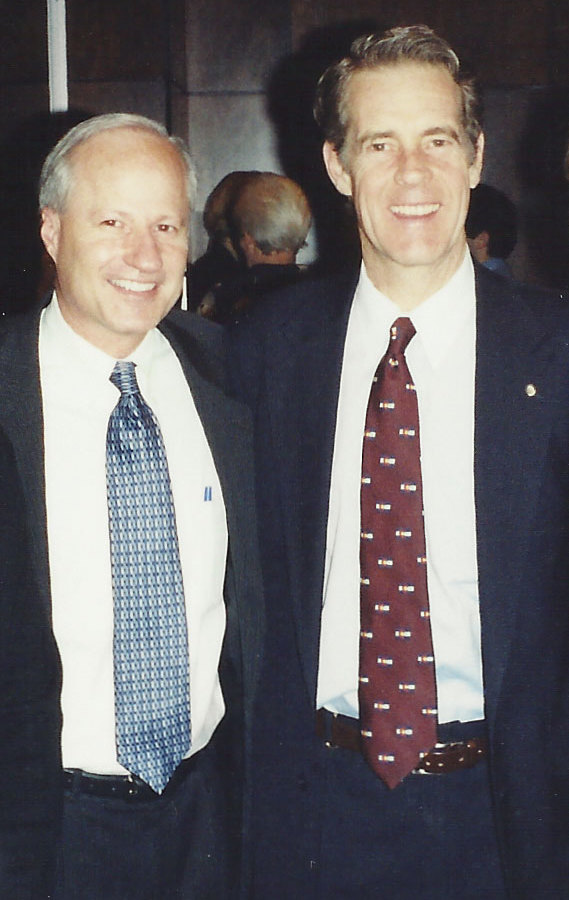
Andrews with Rep. Mike Coffman in 2002

Andrews represented Arapahoe County as a state senator from 1998 to 2005, serving until the term limit under the Colorado Constitution. He served as minority leader 2001-2003. After leading the GOP back to majority control, he was elected as Senate President for 2003-2005. During his tenure, he helped pass bills establishing education vouchers, expanding charter schools, extending tort reform, cutting the capital gains tax, reducing union control of state employees, requiring parental notification when a minor seeks an abortion. Andrews' legislative achievements also included bills providing toll lanes to reduce traffic congestion and outlining a statewide water policy, and he put into law the School Sunshine Act and Colorado's Defense of Marriage Act. He was honored as National Legislator of the Year by the American Legislative Exchange Council (ALEC) and received praise by the Rocky Mountain Family Council and the Colorado Union of Taxpayers.

== Centennial Institute ==
From 2009 until his retirement in 2015, Andrews was the director of the Centennial Institute, which sponsors events, publications, and research in public policy areas. In proclaiming "liberty throughout the land," its aim is to help Colorado Christian University (CCU) teach citizenship and to help Americans renew the spirit of 1776. The Institute was founded in 2009 by Andrews and former US Senator William Armstrong, late president of CCU. Through the Centennial Institute, Andrews helped establish the Western Conservative Summit, which has been held every year since 2010 in Denver.

== On Islam ==
Andrews has later served as national board chairman of former FBI agent John Guandolo's organization Understanding the Threat, designated as an anti-Muslim "hate group" by the Southern Poverty Law Center. The group has also been described as a part of the counter-jihad movement. In 2016, Andrews himself cited "counter-jihad" as one of the reasons why he switched to support Donald Trump for president.

During an address to the Western Conservative Summit on July 12, 2019, Andrews delivered a series of talking points that proved controversial. He claimed that organizations like the Muslim Brotherhood and the Council on American-Islamic Relations (CAIR) were engaging in "civilizational jihad" and trying to move the United States to a Sharia Law based system. He also made the claim that Muslim values are inherently antithetical to American values, saying "They will tell you that a good and faithful Muslim can also be a good and faithful American. Sorry, but I don’t see how", as well as stating that the United States was engaged in a "war to the death" with two intrinsic enemies, "The name of one is Marx. The name of the other is Mohammed". Krista Cole, vice-chair of the Colorado chapter of CAIR, denounced his speech as "Islamophobic". CAIR called for prominent political figures in attendance, including Colorado Senator Cory Gardner, Housing and Urban Development Secretary Ben Carson, and Donald Trump Jr., to condemn the speech.

Andrews went on to organize an "anti-Sharia" event later that year that featured noted European anti-Islam speakers Katie Hopkins and Elisabeth Sabaditsch-Wolff, which was seen to display Andrews' connections to the transatlantic counter-jihad movement. The Western Conservative Summit under Andrews had previously also brought in such speakers as Geert Wilders and Frank Gaffney.

Party political offices
Preceded by Ted L. Strickland	Republican nominee for Governor of Colorado; 1990	Succeeded by Bruce D. Benson
Colorado Senate
Preceded by Mike Coffman	Member of the Colorado Senate from the 27th district 1999–2005	Succeeded by Nancy Spence
Political offices
Preceded by Stan Matsunaka	President of the Colorado Senate; 2003–2005	Succeeded by Joan Fitz-Gerald
