= Tom Sullivan (Colorado politician) =

American politician from Colorado

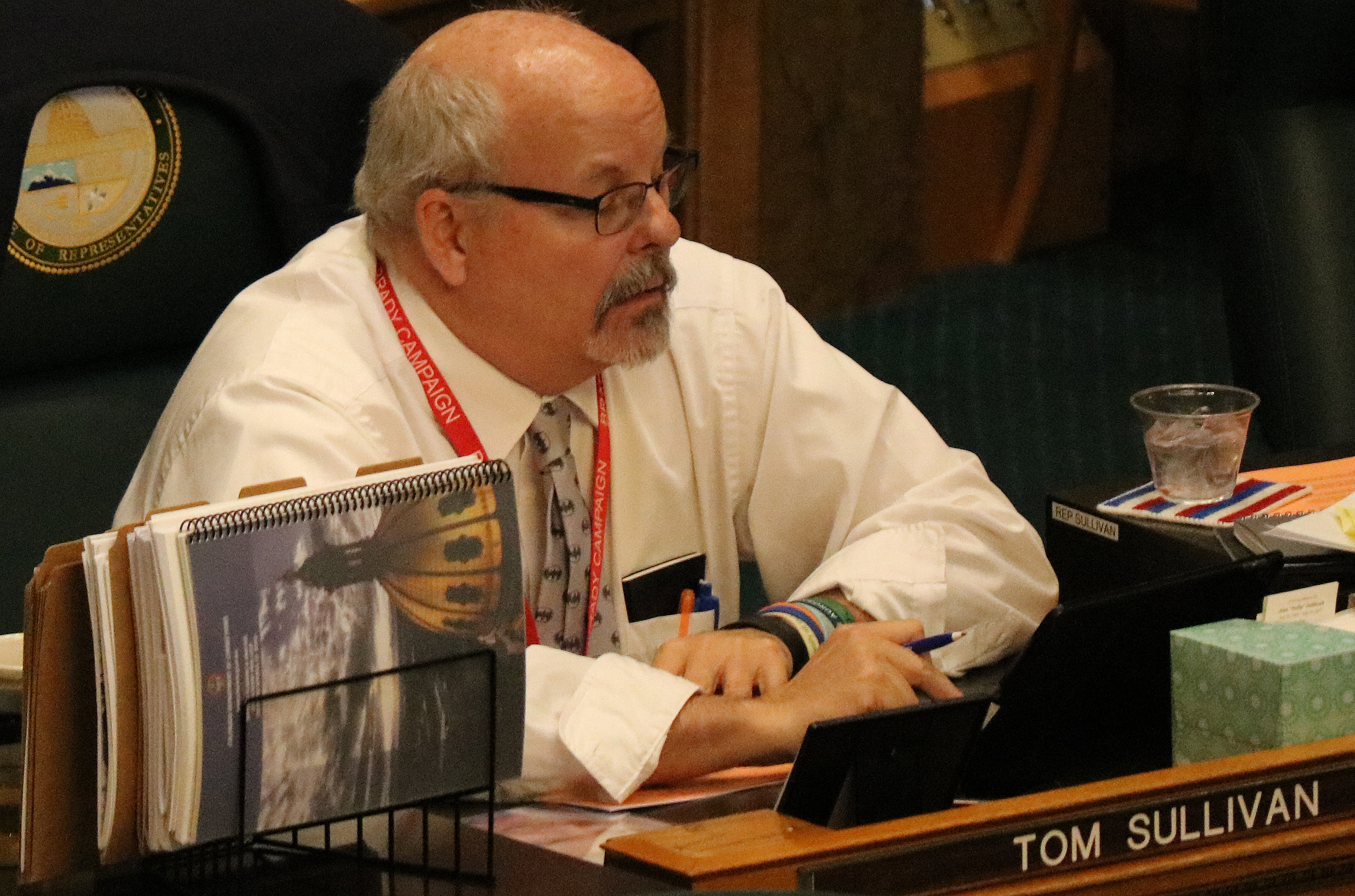

Member of the Colorado Senate from the 27th district
- Incumbent
- Assumed office January 9, 2023
- Preceded by: Chris Kolker

Member of the Colorado House of Representatives from the 37th district
- In office January 4, 2019 – January 9, 2023
- Preceded by: Cole Wist
- Succeeded by: Ruby Dickson

Personal details
- Born: May 17, 1956 (age 70)
- Party: Democratic

Leo Thomas Sullivan III (born May 17, 1956) is an American politician and a Democratic member of the Colorado Senate. He represents District 27, which includes all or parts of Aurora, Centennial, Dove Valley, Inverness, and Foxfield in Arapahoe and Douglas counties.

Prior to his tenure in the state senate, Sullivan served in the Colorado House of Representatives, representing the 37th district in Arapahoe County. In the state house, Representative Sullivan sat on the Transportation and Local Government Committee and was the Vice Chair of the Business Affairs and Labor Committee. He was elected as the first Democrat to represent House District 37 in 2018 after having run an unsuccessful bid for Senate District 26 in 2016. Sullivan is known for his advocacy and legislation surrounding gun control, which began following the death of his son in the 2012 Aurora, Colorado shooting.

== Personal life ==
Tom Sullivan married his wife, Terry, in 1978. They have had two children together: Megan and Alex. His son, Alex, was killed in the 2012 Aurora, Colorado shooting at the age of 27. After this event, Sullivan became active in advocating for gun control, gun safety and gun violence prevention before running for office. Representative Sullivan focuses on the issues of crime victims' rights, worker protections, veterans affairs, and expanding access to mental health treatment.

Prior to becoming a legislator, Sullivan served in the US Air Force from 1974 to 1977. With help from the GI Bill, he attended Metropolitan State University of Denver and studied accounting and journalism. Sullivan then began his 30-year career with the United States Postal Service (USPS). He has been a member of several labor unions throughout his life, starting as a Teamster when he was 16-years-old, working concessions at Red Wing Stadium. While working for USPS, Sullivan was a member of the American Postal Workers Union (APWU).

== Political career ==
=== Campaign ===
After his son's murder, Sullivan entered into politics to campaign for stricter gun regulations.

=== Election ===
In 2016, Sullivan ran against Jack Tate for State Senate District 26 and was defeated. Sullivan went on to run for Tate's old seat in House District 37 in 2018, and won against the incumbent, Cole Wist, with 54% of the vote. Sullivan is the first Democrat to represent House District 37. In his re-election campaign in 2020, Sullivan beat Caroline Cornell with 55.6% of the vote.

In the 2022 general election, Sullivan won the race for Senate District 27, defeating Republican nominee Tom Kim with roughly 55.5% of the vote.

=== Successful legislation ===
Whistleblower Protection Public Health Emergencies (HB20-1415) - Sullivan introduced the whistleblower protection law during the 2020 session as a response to retaliatory workplace actions during the COVID-19 pandemic. The law provides protections to employees who raise concerns about workplace health and safety during a public health emergency. Employers and contractors are prohibited from discriminating or retaliating against employees that have raised these concerns.

Administration Of Late Ballots (HB20-1313) - HB20-1313 set provisions and requirements for county clerk and recorder offices that helped to expedite the mailing of late ballots. These provisions include requirements for processing voter registration applications, providing replacements for lost ballots, and expedited USPS shipping of late ballots.

Sunset Motorcycle Operator Safety Training Program (HB20-1285) - Spurred by a regulatory sunset review and report, HB20-1285 extended the repeal date of Colorado's Motorcycle Operator Safety Training (MOST) program from 2020 to 2025. The MOST program within Colorado State Patrol provides motorcycle endorsement through instruction and training.

Extreme Risk Protection Orders (HB19-1177) - Sullivan acted as a prime sponsor for the Extreme Risk Protection Order (ERPO) law. ERPO, also referred to as the “Red Flag” law, is one of the most progressive pieces of gun legislation to come from the Colorado General Assembly. Effective since January 1, 2020, the red flag law has given family and household members the ability to file a petition for an extreme risk protection order against a gun owner under a reasonable basis. The petitioner must prove by a preponderance of the evidence that the gun owner poses a significant risk to themselves or others. If granted, ERPO requires the gun owner to surrender all firearms in possession and prevents the individual from obtaining firearms for 364 days and provides an option to appeal.

Mental Health Parity Insurance Medicaid (HB19-1269) - Sullivan's HB19-1269 altered health care requirements for private and Medicaid insurers to include behavioral, mental health, and substance abuse disorders as mandatory coverage. This requirement has enabled mental health patients to receive services that are on par with physical health services.

Minimum Two-person Crew On Freight Trains (HB19-1034) - Requires common carriers of property on railroads to have at least two people operating the train.

Workforce Diploma Pilot Program (HB19-1236) - HB19-1236 created the Workforce Diploma Pilot Program (WDPP) within the Department of Education. WDPP is designed to provide financial incentives to eligible providers who are engaging adults to finish their high school diplomas. The bill apportioned three years of operation for the program, and will be reviewed for renewal in the 2022 session.

Apprenticeships And Vocational Technical Training (SB19-171) - The law created the Colorado State Apprenticeship Resource Directory within the Department of Labor and Employment to promote apprenticeship programs in the State. The law then sets minimum requirements for the department to advertise the directory to the public.

Victim Notification Criminal Proceedings (HB19-1064) - This act changed a previous law in Colorado that requires victims of certain crimes to opt-in to receive notifications about the offender. HB19-1064 changes this to automatically enroll victims to receive notifications, and also appropriated $300,000 to Community Crime Victims Grant Program in the Colorado Department of Public Health and Environment.

Court Facility Dog During Witness Testimony (HB19-1220) - This law allows witnesses to be accompanied by a court facility dog during testimony if it is determined by a judge that the presence of a dog will reduce anxiety and improve the witness's testimony without impeding court proceedings.

=== Recall effort ===
In May 2019, a recall effort was launched against Sullivan. The organizers of the recall, led by Kristi Brown of the Colorado Republican Party, disagreed with his sponsorship of a successful bill (HB 19-1177) that permits judges to take citizens' guns away from them if the judges receive information that a citizen is dangerous. The recall did not make the ballot.
