= Christine Scanlan =

American politician

Member of the Colorado House of Representatives from the 56th district
- In office January 2, 2008 – December 31, 2010
- Preceded by: Dan Gibbs
- Succeeded by: Millie Hamner

Personal details
- Born: c. 1964 Littleton, Colorado
- Party: Democratic
- Spouse: Tim
- Profession: nonprofit executive

Christine Scanlan (born c. 1964) is a former legislator in the U.S. state of Colorado. A Democrat appointed to a vacancy in the Colorado House of Representatives in 2007, Scanlan represented House District 56, encompassing Eagle, Lake and Summit Counties, including the skiing communities of Vail and Breckenridge from 2007 to 2010.

== Early career ==
Scanlan was born in Littleton, Colorado, and graduated from Columbine High School. Currently a resident of Dillon, Colorado, and a resident of Summit County since 1995, she holds a bachelor's degree in history and a master's degree in nonprofit organization management from Regis University. While in school, Scanlan worked as a ski lift operator and children's ski instructor in Keystone, Colorado to help pay college expenses.

Since 1994, she has worked for the Keystone Center, a nonprofit focusing on science education and dispute resolution, by 2007 becoming their Senior Vice President and Chief Operating Officer. In that capacity, Scanlan oversaw both Keystone's administrative offices and Keystone Science School's campus-based programs.

Scanlan, who had served with the Summit School District Accountability Committee, was appointed from among ten applicants to fill a vacancy on the Summit School District Board of Education in April 2004 and was elected to a full term in November 2005, taking the highest vote total among the seven candidates for three school board seats. She was named the board's vice-president in November 2005 and then named its president in November 2007. During her tenure on the board of education, Scanlan was critical of standards set by the No Child Left Behind Act, and was a proponent of greater engagement with the local Spanish-speaking community. In 2007, Scanlan served on a state commission on education that provided recommendations to Gov. Bill Ritter on improving Colorado public schools. She also served (as of 2008) as president of the Mountain Boards of Cooperative Educational Services.

Scanlan is married; she and her husband, Tim, have three daughters, Catherine, Julia, and Elise, who attend Summit County public schools.

== Colorado House of Representatives ==
=== 2007 legislative appointment ===
In December 2007, Rep. Dan Gibbs was appointed by a vacancy committee to the Colorado State Senate seat vacated by Joan Fitz-Gerald, leaving his seat vacant. Scanlan was selected over five other applicants to fill the remainder of Gibbs' two-year term; a majority of the thirteen members of the vacancy committee present chose her on the first ballot. Her appointment made her the 21st woman in a 40-member Democratic House caucus that thus became majority-female. After being appointed to the legislature, Scanlan reduced her work load at the Keystone Center to a part-time position, but remained president of the Summit School Board through 2008.

=== 2008 legislative session ===
For the 2008 legislative session, Scanlan stated that her legislative priorities include "the bark beetle, Interstate 70, economic and education issues." She intends to run for a full term in the 2008 general elections, and to continue serving on the Summit School District board, although stepping down from her role as president. Scanlan was also appointed by House Speaker Andrew Romanoff to replace Dan Gibbs on the Colorado Tourism Office Board of Directors.

For her first legislative session, in 2008, Scanlan was appointed to the House Agriculture, Livestock and Natural Resources Committee and the House Transportation and Energy Committee. Scanlan has pressed for extension of the Colorado Forest Restoration Act, a program providing funding to local groups to mitigate forest damage and wildfire danger brought about by expanding bark beetle infestations in Colorado, and is sponsoring, with Sen. Gibbs, a measure to expand the program. In September 2008 Scanlan led a delegation of Summit County officials to Washington, D.C. to lobby for additional resources to combat bark beetle infestations.

Scanlan sponsored a total of 11 bills during the 2008 session, all of which were signed into law, including measures to create an income tax donation checkoff for the Colorado Healthy Rivers Fund, to extend the Colorado Passenger Tramway Board, to restrict motor vehicle travel on public lands, and to bring safety standards for school busses in line with federal requirements. She has also sponsored legislation to create incentives for businesses that harvest and make products from trees killed by bark beetles, and education reform legislation, and including proposals to replace Colorado's CSAP exams with national EXPLORE, PLAN and ACT tests in upper grades, and to align educational standards across grade levels. With Sen. Gibbs, Scanlan was a prominent opponent of several proposals to charge tolls along the I-70 mountain corridor within her district.

Following the legislative session, Scanlan was named the vice-chair of an interim legislative committee to study wildfire issues.

Later in the year, Scanlan was a prominent critic of Denver Water's decision to close the Lake Dillon Dam Road for security reasons, calling the sudden closure and lack of prior notification "inexcusable," and praising the dam's partial re-opening several weeks later. Shortly after the road was reopened, Scanlan and Sen. Dan Gibbs announced plans for legislation to prevent future unilateral closures and to encourage cooperation between agencies to share vulnerability assessments and emergency plans.

=== 2008 election ===
Early in 2008, Scanlan announced her intention to run for a full term in the state house in the November 2008 general election. She faced Republican Muhammad Ali Hasan, and, as of the end of the 2008 legislation session, trailed the largely self-financing Republican in campaign funds, running a lower-budget, "grassroots" campaign. In April 2008, House Speaker Andrew Romanoff accompanied Scanlan on a "midterm progress report" tour of her house district.

Scanlan criticized Hasan's spending as "shameful" after he loaned over $40,000 to his campaign. By September, Hasan had outspent Scanlan by roughly 20-to-1, after donating nearly $200,000 to his own campaign, a move Scanlan characterized as "buying name recognition." Ultimately, Scanlan raised nearly $80,000 for her re-election bid, as compared to Hasan's $350,000. Colorado 527 group Accountability for Colorado also distributed mailers in support of Scanlan, however, she expressed disapproval at their negative tone and over election laws that allow such groups to operate.

During a September debate on children's issues, Scanlan touted her legislative work on standards for educational assessment and her support for charter schools, but was criticized by Hasan for promoting "too many regulations" on education and for not supporting school vouchers. Scanlan was also critical of Hasan's plans to press for construction of a monorail along the I-70 corridor, instead supporting a thorough and coordinated study of the impacts and costs of mass transit. In contrast with Hasan's advocacy of reduced regulation of national forests, Scanlan called for increased federal funding for local projects to mitigate pine beetle damage.

Although Hasan was endorsed by the Vail Daily, for which he was a former columnist, Scanlan was endorsed by the Summit Daily News. and the Denver Post. Scanlan prevailed over Hasan in the general election, defeating the challenger with 53 percent of the popular vote.

=== 2009 legislative session ===
For the 2009 legislative session, Scanlan was named to seats on the House Business Affairs Committee and the House Education Committee. She plans to propose an omnibus forest health bill during the 2009 session.

Scanlan, with Sen. Gibbs, again led a delegation to Washington D.C. in February 2009 to lobby for funding to address fire dangers arising from the bark beetle epidemic.

=== 2011 legislative session ===
Representative Scanlan resigned her seat and was appointed Senior Education Policy Advisor for the administration of Colorado Governor John Hickenlooper. She was succeeded by Democrat Millie Hamner a retired educator.
