= Nancy Spence =

American politician (born 1936)

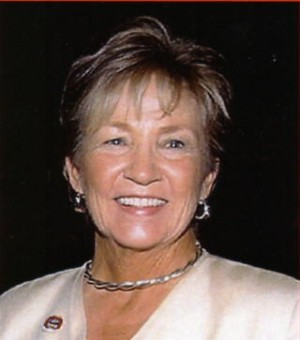

Member of the Colorado Senate from the 27th district
- In office January 12, 2005 – January 9, 2013
- Preceded by: John Andrews
- Succeeded by: David Balmer

Member of the Colorado House of Representatives from the 39th district
- In office January 6, 1999 – January 12, 2005
- Preceded by: Paul D. Schauer
- Succeeded by: David Balmer

Personal details
- Born: December 12, 1936 (age 89) Denver, Colorado, U.S.
- Party: Republican
- Spouse: Peter

Nancy Spence (born December 12, 1936) is a former Republican Colorado legislator. First elected to the Cherry Creek School District Board of Education in the 1980s, Spence was elected to three terms in the Colorado House of Representatives, serving from 1999 to 2005, and represented the 27th district of the Colorado Senate from 2005 until 2013.

== Biography ==
Born in Denver, Colorado, Spence graduated from South Denver High School, where she met her future husband, Peter. She attended Colorado State University from 1955 to 1956. Spence married in 1958; she and her husband, a dentist, have four children: Chris, Kathy, Greg and Meg, and six grandchildren.

Spence was first elected to the Cherry Creek School District Board of Education in 1980 and served there continuously until 1993. During her tenure on the school board, she served as board treasurer for two years and board president for five. She is also a founding member of the Cherry Creek Schools Foundation and of the Denver School of the Arts.

Spence was an alternate delegate to the 1992 Republican National Convention and a delegate to the 1996 convention.

First elected to the Colorado House of Representatives in 1998, representing the 39th district—portions of Arapahoe County, Colorado south of Aurora, near Cherry Creek State Park. During her three terms, she sat on the House Education Committee, serving as chairman during her last two terms. She also sat on the House Judiciary Committee and House Appropriations Committee during her first term, the House Criminal Justice Committee during her second term, and the House Transportation and Energy Committee during her third term.

Focusing particularly on education issues in the Republican-controlled state house, Spence, in 2003, sponsored a successful measure to create a statewide school voucher program. The measure was the first statewide voucher program to be enacted into law following the U.S. Supreme Court decision in Zelman v. Simmons-Harris that voucher programs did not necessarily violate the Establishment Clause of the First Amendment. Although the measure was signed into law by Governor Bill Owens, it was soon struck down by Colorado courts for violating the principle of local control.

Spence was elected to the Colorado State Senate in 2004; there, she serves on the Senate Education Committee and the Senate Transportation Committee. In 2007, she was elected Senate Assistant Minority Leader; as such, she is also a member of the Legislative Council.

Spence has been named a "Legislator of the Year" by several organizations, including the American Heart Association in 1999, the Colorado Association of Community Centered Boards in 2001, and the Colorado Alliance for Reform in Education in 2004.
