= Millie Hamner =

American politician

Member of the Colorado House of Representatives from the 61st district
- In office December 2010 – January 4, 2019
- Preceded by: Christine Scanlan
- Succeeded by: Julie McCluskie

Personal details
- Born: Millie Hamner
- Party: Democratic
- Education: University of Denver
- Occupation: Politician, educator
- Website: www.milliehamner.com

Millie Hamner is an American educator and politician who served as a member of the Colorado State House of Representatives and a former superintendent of schools for Summit County, Colorado.

== Career ==
In December 2010, Rep. Christine Scanlan resigned from the House District 56 seat to join the administration of Colorado Governor John Hickenlooper. A committee of HD-56 Democrats selected Hamner to fill the vacancy, and Hamner served the remainder of Scanlan's term.

After the 2012 redistricting of Colorado legislative boundaries, Hamner ran as a Democrat for the newly-redrawn District 61 seat in the 2012 General Election. Colorado's House District 61 includes Summit, Lake and Pitkin counties and parts of Delta and Gunnison counties. She was unopposed in the Democratic primary. In the November 6 General Election, Hamner defeated Debra Irvine (R), Ellen Temby (L), Kathleen Curry (I) and Robert Petrowsky (C).

Hamner served as the chair of the House Education Committee and sat on both the Business and Appropriations Committees.

In 2011, she sponsored successful legislation streamlining the license renewal process for teachers, speeding up the Colorado Department of Transportation’s timeline for recommending improvements on the traffic-plagued I-70 Mountain Corridor, creating a biomass fuel program, and making new uses for trees killed in the Western Slope's bark beetle infestation.

Hamner sponsored the Colorado READ Act, one of Colorado's major education initiatives in 2012. The law expanded early childhood literacy programs.

In 2013, Hamner sponsored successful legislation improving early childhood development programs, financing the state's school system, and numerous other education-related bills. Hamner carried the Future School Finance Act, redesigning Colorado's school funding formulas, which is subject to voter approval in the November 2013 election. Hamner also passed several natural resource-related bills in 2013.

== Electoral history ==
Colorado State House District 61 General Election, 2012
Primary election
| Party | Candidate | Votes | % |
|---|---|---|---|
| Democratic | Millie Hamner | 2,277 | 100.00% |
| Total votes | | 2,277 | 100.00% |
General election
| Democratic | Millie Hamner | 19,621 | 47.40% |
| Republican | Debra Irvine | 14,124 | 34.12% |
| Independent | Kathleen Curry | 5,732 | 13.85% |
| Libertarian | Ellen Temby | 1,132 | 2.73% |
| Constitution | Robert E. Petrowsky | 783 | 1.92% |
| Total votes | | 41,392 | 100.00% |

Colorado State House District 61 General Election, 2014
Primary election
| Party | Candidate | Votes | % |
|---|---|---|---|
| Democratic | Millie Hamner (incumbent) | 3,113 | 100.00% |
| Total votes | | 3,113 | 100.00% |
General election
| Democratic | Millie Hamner (incumbent) | 17,500 | 52.28% |
| Republican | Debra Irvine | 14,455 | 43.19% |
| Libertarian | Mac Trench | 1,516 | 4.53% |
| Total votes | | 33,471 | 100.00% |

Colorado State House District 61 General Election, 2016
Primary election
| Party | Candidate | Votes | % |
|---|---|---|---|
| Democratic | Millie Hamner (incumbent) | 4,082 | 100.00% |
| Total votes | | 4,082 | 100.00% |
General election
| Democratic | Millie Hamner (incumbent) | 24,562 | 56.12% |
| Republican | Bob Schutt | 19,208 | 43.88% |
| Total votes | | 43,770 | 100.00% |
