= 1990 Colorado gubernatorial election =

- November 6, 1990
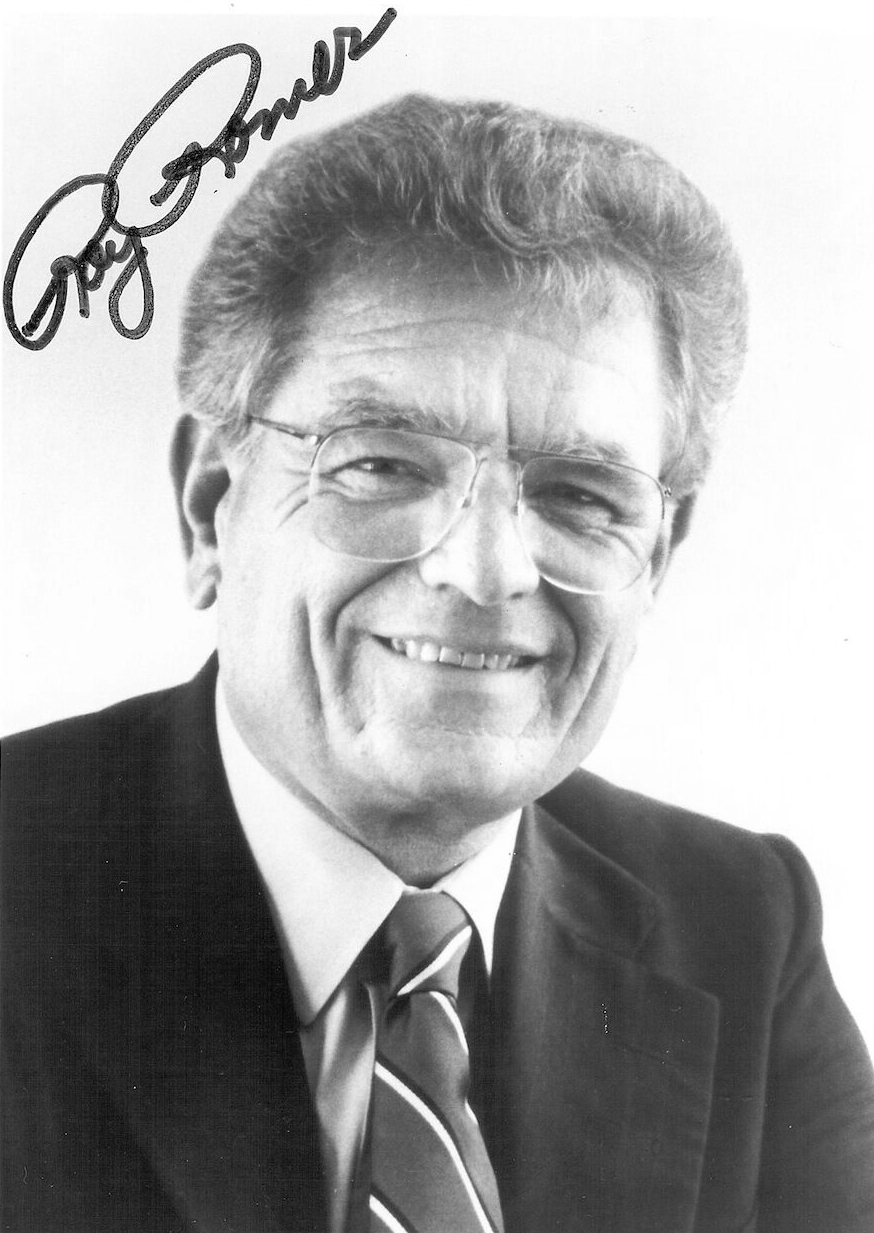

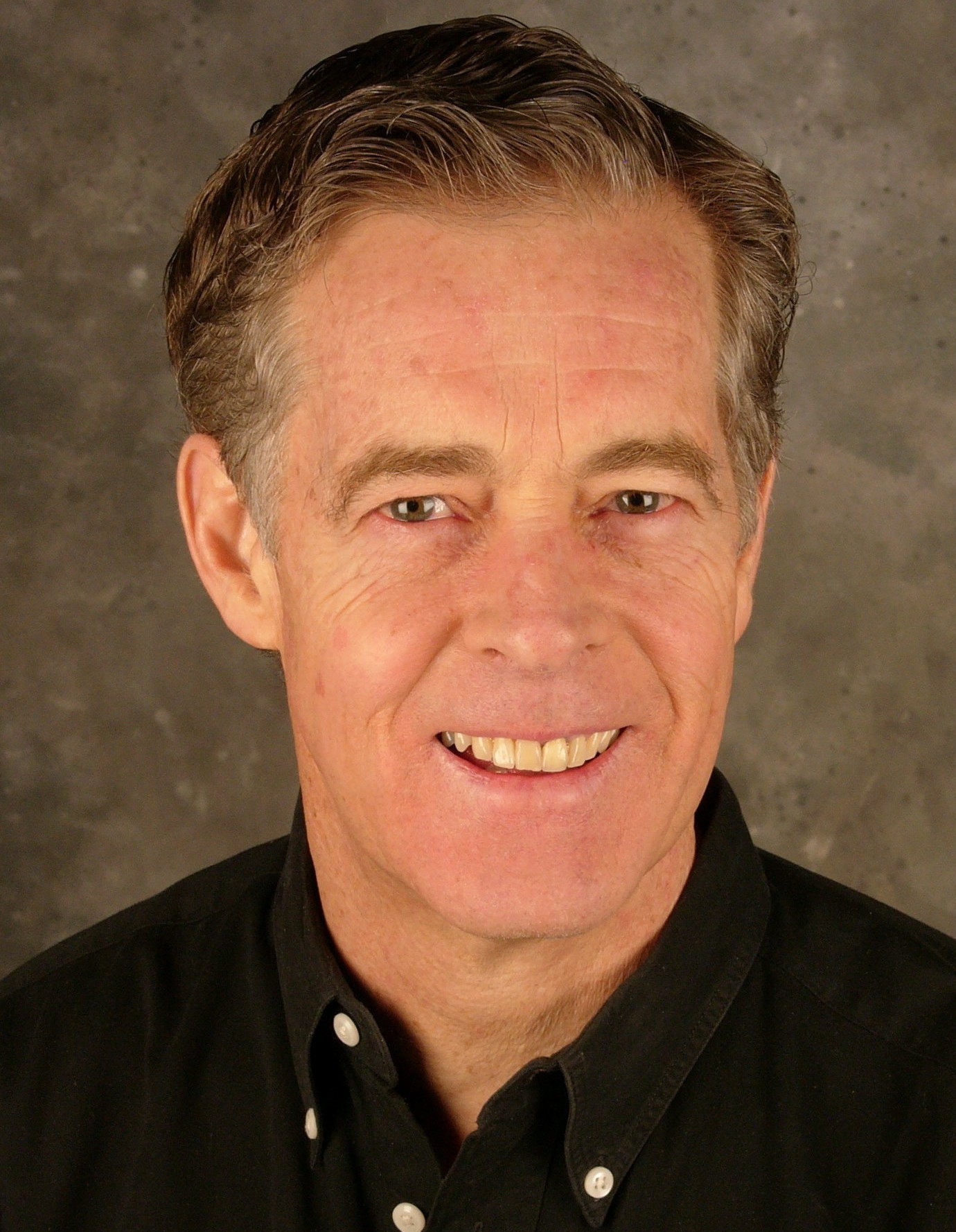
Nominee	Roy Romer	John Andrews
Party	Democratic	Republican
Running mate	Mike Callihan	Lillian Bickel
Popular vote	626,032	358,403
Percentage	61.89%	35.43%
- County results Romer: 40–50% 50–60% 60–70% 70–80% Andrews: 50–60% 60–70%
Governor before election
Roy Romer
Democratic
Elected Governor
Roy Romer
Democratic

The 1990 Colorado gubernatorial election was held on November 6, 1990. Incumbent Democrat Roy Romer defeated Republican nominee John Andrews with 61.89% of the vote.

== Primary elections ==
Primary elections were held on August 14, 1990.

=== Democratic primary ===
==== Candidates ====
- Roy Romer, incumbent Governor

==== Results ====
Democratic primary results
Party	Candidate	Votes	%
Democratic	Roy Romer (incumbent)	165,164	100.00

=== Republican primary ===
==== Candidates ====
- John Andrews, businessman

==== Results ====
Republican primary results
Party	Candidate	Votes	%
Republican	John Andrews	156,418	100.00

== General election ==
=== Candidates ===
Major party candidates

- Roy Romer, Democratic
- John Andrews, Republican

Other candidates

- David Aitken, Libertarian
- David Livingston, Prohibition

=== Results ===
1990 Colorado gubernatorial election
Party	Candidate	Votes	%	±%
Democratic	Roy Romer (incumbent)	626,032	61.89%	+3.69%
Republican	John Andrews	358,403	35.43%	−5.60%
Libertarian	David Aitken	18,930	1.87%	
Prohibition	David Livingston	7,907	0.78%	+0.01%
Majority		267,629	26.46%	+9.29%
Turnout		1,011,272		
Democratic hold		Swing		
