= Joan Fitz-Gerald =

American politician

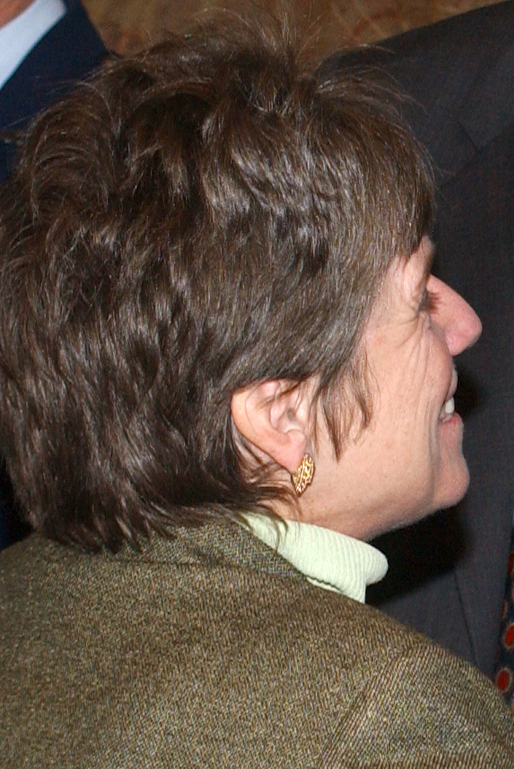

Member of the Colorado Senate from the 16th district
- In office 2001 – November 14, 2007
- Preceded by: John Andrews
- Succeeded by: Dan Gibbs

Personal details
- Born: June 2, 1948 (age 78) New York City, New York, U.S.
- Party: Democratic
- Education: Marymount Manhattan College (BA); Fordham University (JD)

Joan Fitz-Gerald is an American politician who served as a member of the Colorado Senate, representing the 16th district from 2001 until 2007. She also served as President of the Senate, the first woman to hold that office.

Fitz-Gerald is a former chair of the Democratic Legislative Campaign Committee (DLCC) with state-house Democrats picking up seats across the nation under her chairmanship.

== Early life and education ==
Born in New York City, Joan graduated from Marymount Manhattan College with a B.A. in History and later attended Fordham Law School, where she met her husband. The Fitz-Geralds moved to Colorado in 1977.

== Career ==
Before serving in the State Senate, Fitz-Gerald was a county clerk. She was the first woman ever elected as Jefferson County clerk and recorder, where she pioneered the use of mail ballots.

Until November 2007, Fitz-Gerald represented the 16th Legislative District in the Colorado State Senate. She represented 7 counties in the Legislature: Boulder, Clear Creek, Gilpin, Jefferson and Summit. She was the chair of, and served on, the executive committee of Legislative Council, Legislative Council, and Senate Services. She also served on the Senate State, Veterans & Military Affairs Committee.

She was elected as the President of the Colorado Senate in 2005, where several GOP state senators broke with the tradition of endorsing the majority party's pick after the Democrats fired a clerk.

Fitz-Gerald was considered to be one of several possible Democratic candidates for Governor of Colorado in 2006, but chose not to run. On April 18, 2007, she announced that she would run for U.S. Congress, representing the 2nd Congressional District seat being vacated by Mark Udall, who ran for, and eventually was elected to, the U.S. Senate. On August 2, 2007 Emily's List endorsed her.

In November 2007, Fitz-Gerald announced her retirement from the Colorado Senate to campaign full-time for the U.S. House. Peter Groff was elected to succeed her as Senate President, and Dan Gibbs was appointed to fill the senate vacancy left by her resignation. In August 2008, Fitz-Gerald lost the Democratic primary to Jared Polis.

In November 2008, Fitz-Gerald was mentioned as a possible successor to Mike Coffman in the Secretary of State of Colorado's office.

In December 2008, Fitz-Gerald was mentioned as a possible successor to Ken Salazar in the U.S. Senate after Salazar was chosen by President-Elect Barack Obama for Secretary of the Interior. After Salazar's confirmation, Michael Bennet was ultimately selected as the replacement for his Senate seat by Colorado Governor Bill Ritter.

== Personal life ==
She is married to John Fitz-Gerald. The couple has two adult sons.
