= Jeanne Nicholson =

American politician

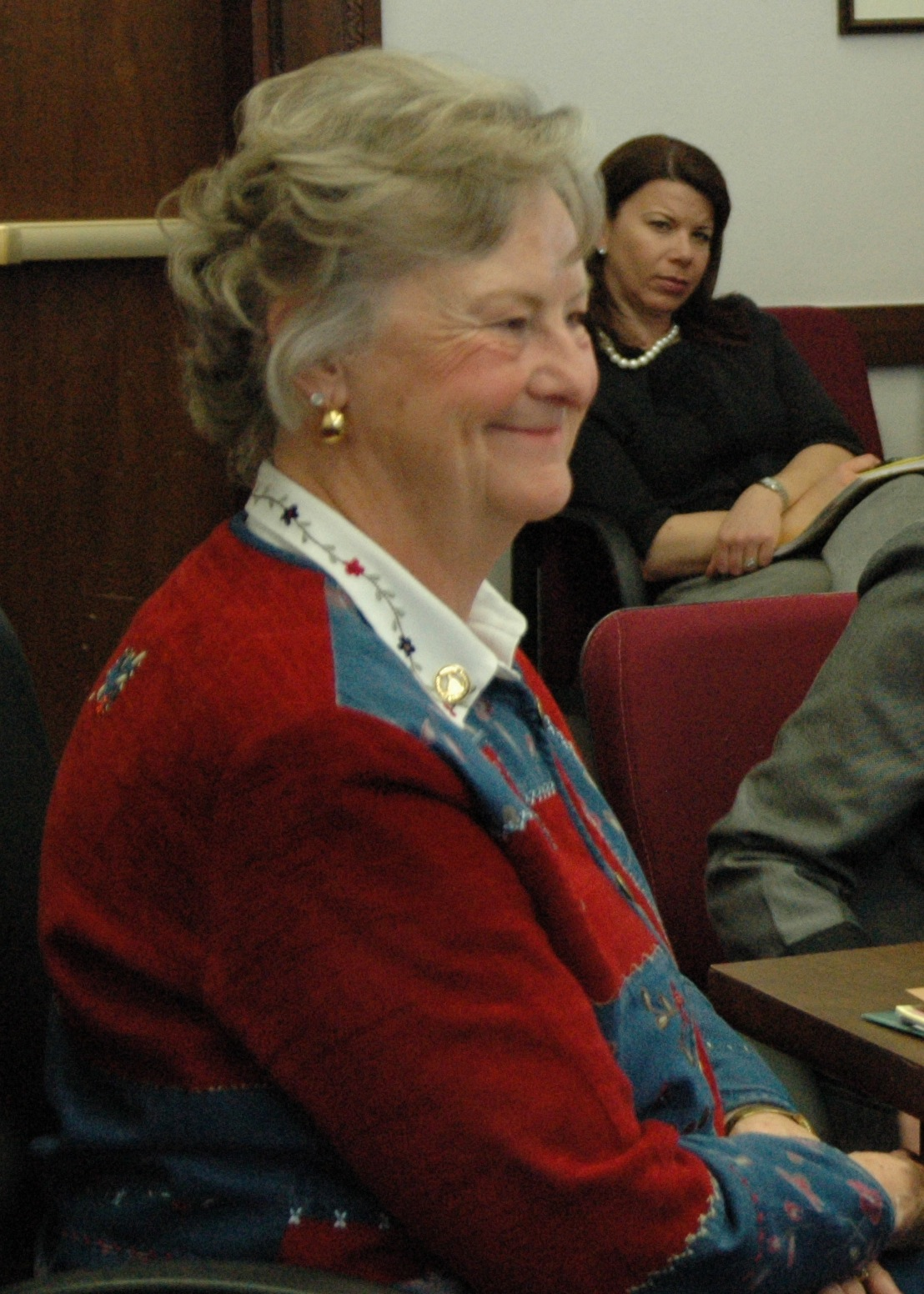
- Nicholson in 2011

Member of the Colorado Senate from the 16th district
- In office January 2011 – January 7, 2015
- Preceded by: Dan Gibbs
- Succeeded by: Tim Neville

Personal details
- Born: September 22, 1943 (age 82)
- Party: Democratic
- Profession: Public health nurse

Jeanne Nicholson (born September 22, 1943) is a former Democratic member of the Colorado Senate who represented the 16th district from 2011 to 2015, encompassing the city of Georgetown, Colorado.

== Political career ==
Nicholson ran for Colorado State Representative, District 62, in 2000, but was defeated by Republican Glenn Scott.

In 2010, she ran for Colorado State Senate, District 16, defeating Republican Tim Leonard.

In the 2011 session of the Colorado General Assembly, she vice-chaired the local government committee and was a member of its appropriations, education and judiciary committees.

In 2014, she ran for reelection but was defeated by in Republican Tim Neville.

== Personal life ==
Nicolson is a retired public health nurse, having worked nearly 40 years in nursing. She graduated from Denver East High School in 1961. She earned a Bachelor of Science degree in nursing in 1966, and a Master of Science degree in community health nursing from the University of Colorado College of Nursing in 1999. Her master's thesis was "Politicians' Perceptions of Public Health".
