= Western Conservative Summit =

The Western Conservative Summit is an annual conference of influential U.S. conservatives, held in Denver, Colorado, since 2010. It is organized by the Centennial Institute and Colorado Christian University. It has grown each year, and now includes a Young Conservatives Leadership Conference, which is led by radio host Hugh Hewitt.

== Past events ==
=== 2011 ===
In 2011, Herman Cain was the winner of the presidential nomination straw poll. Syndicated columnist and talk show host Dennis Prager was among the speakers.

=== 2012 ===
In 2012, speakers included Glenn Beck and Arizona Governor Jan Brewer. Over 1,500 people attended.

=== 2013 ===
The 2013 Western Conservative Summit was themed "Freedom's New Day", and took place July 26–28. Wisconsin Governor Scott Walker was the keynote speaker, calling for optimism within the Republican Party and increased activity in reaching voters.

Also among the speakers were Mia Love, mayor of Saratoga Springs, Utah; former U.S. Senator Bill Armstrong, president of Colorado Christian University; Texas Senator Ted Cruz; former Arkansas Governor Mike Huckabee; Jonah Goldberg, a conservative columnist and author; and former Florida Representative Allen West. About 2,000 people attended the four-day summit.

Cruz won a straw poll for the Republican presidential nominee, with 225 votes (45% of votes cast). Cruz' speech included a call to "abolish" the Internal Revenue Service, and urged attendees to explain the Republican Party's message more clearly in the future.

=== 2014 ===
The 2014 Western Conservative summit was themed "America at its Best" and took place in Denver Colorado July 18–20. The 666 voters at the conference favored Ben Carson (22%), Ted Cruz (13%) and Sarah Palin (12%) in a straw poll for the 2016 Republican presidential nomination.

=== 2015 ===
The theme of the 2015 Western Conservative Summit is "Your Story: Freedom Alive". The summit drew criticism when it barred the participation of the Colorado Log Cabin Republicans, a Republican organization that advocates for equal rights for gays and lesbians. Centennial Institute head John Andrews explained that their "worldview and policy agenda are fundamentally at odds with what Colorado Christian University stands for" and that the summit additionally has a policy of not allowing vendors who advocate for higher taxes or about climate change.

=== 2021 ===
In 2021, the summit began using the approval voting method for their polls. Ron DeSantis won with 74% approval, followed by Donald Trump with 71%, Ted Cruz with 43%, Mike Pompeo with 39%, and Tim Scott with 36%.

=== 2022 ===
Ron DeSantis won a second year in a row with 71.01%, followed by Trump with 67.68%, Cruz with 28.73%, and Ben Carson with 24.15%.

=== 2023 ===
DeSantis won the approval polling for a third year with 66.9%, followed by Trump with 63.4%, Larry Elder with 44.9%, Tim Scott with 35.3%, and Vivek Ramaswamy with 24.2%. Democratic presidential candidate Robert F. Kennedy Jr. also received 14.4% approval, while Joe Biden received less than 1%. Trump, however, won a first-past-the-post poll with 40.3%, followed by DeSantis with 35.8%, Elder with 7.7%, and Scott with 5.8%. 73% of those polled named election integrity and religious freedom as their top policy concerns, followed by education/parental rights at 72%, immigration/border security at 71%, and gun rights at 71%.
