= Colorado's 37th House of Representatives district =

American legislative district

Colorado's 37th State House of Representatives district
Representative
Chad Clifford; D–Centennial
- Demographics: 70% White; 3% Black; 11% Hispanic; 9% Asian; 0% Native American; 6% Multiracial
- Population (2024): 87,638

Colorado's 37th House of Representatives district is one of 65 districts in the Colorado House of Representatives. It has been represented by Chad Clifford since 2024.
