= Tim Neville =

American politician

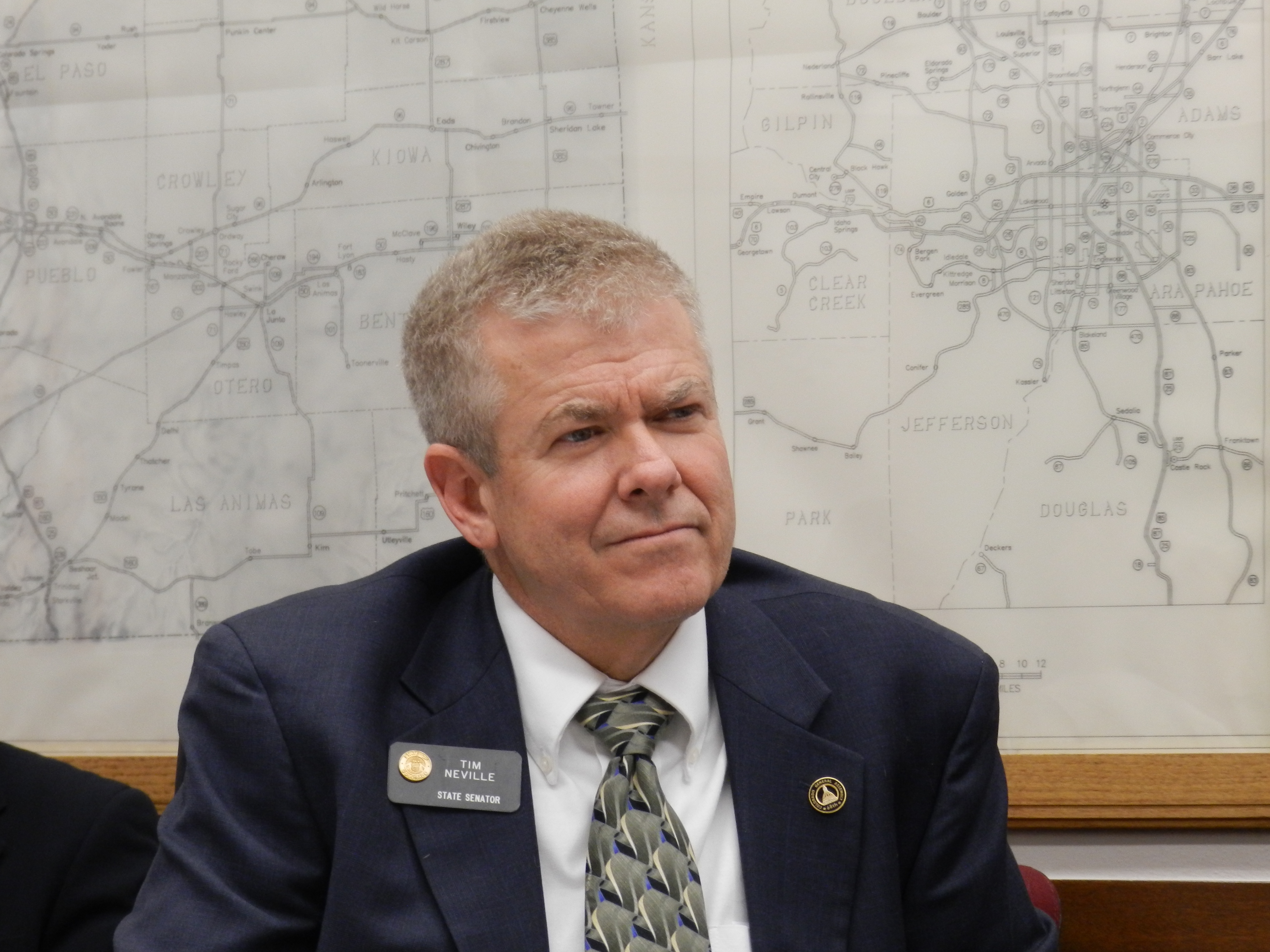

Member of the Colorado Senate from the 16th district
- In office January 7, 2015 – January 4, 2019
- Preceded by: Jeanne Nicholson
- Succeeded by: Tammy Story

Member of the Colorado Senate from the 22nd district
- In office 2011–2013
- Preceded by: Mike Kopp
- Succeeded by: Andy Kerr

Personal details
- Party: Republican
- Children: Patrick Neville
- Education: Regis University

Tim Neville is a former Republican member of the Colorado Senate from the 16th district. Neville was known for his hardline conservative stances on social issues, education and gun legislation.

== Biography ==
Neville was born and raised in Florida. He has a degree in business administration from Regis University and has lived in Jefferson County, Colorado since 1988. His professional experience includes managing Neville Insurance Associates, working in food distribution sales, and working in restaurant management.

Neville was appointed to the state senate in 2011 from District 22 and after redistricting he was elected from District 16 in November, 2014, when he defeated incumbent Democrat Sen. Jeanne Nicholson. Neville won 34,758 votes to 32,615 for Nicholson.

In the Senate, Neville served as vice-chair of the Business Labor and Technology Committee, chairman of the Finance Committee, member of the Education Committee, chair of the Legislative Audit Committee, and vice chair of the Sales & Use Tax Simplification Task Force during the interim of 2018.

== Colorado State Senate ==
Neville was the sponsor of Senate Bill 036 in 2016 that adjusted the requirements for the posting of a surety bond in conjunction with appealing a tax case. Prior to SB 036 being signed into law, a taxpayer who filed an appeal against the Colorado Department of Revenue was required to set aside twice the dollar amount which s/he was contesting regardless of which court hears the case. Upon the bill becoming law, however, that changed and the appellant is not required to set aside any money, unless s/he appeals to the Appellate or Supreme Court.

In 2017, Neville was the sponsor of House Bill 1313. This bill addressed some significant concerns within the protocol for executing civil asset forfeiture. HB 1313 strengthened citizens’ rights when their property is seized and puts safeguards in place to help eliminate possible fraud.

In Education policy, he sponsored Senate Bill 62 in 2017 which prohibited colleges from abridging free speech on campus, and in 2018, Senate Bill 269 which provided funding for schools to implement school safety measures to reduce school violence.

Among his health care and safety efforts are included House Bill 1381 concerning marijuana integration regulations and Senate Bill 270 which established a state-wide referral program to aide at-risk individuals in obtaining referrals for mental health treatment. Both of these bill passed and were signed into law in 2018.

=== 2018 election ===
In the 2018 Senate elections, Neville's district was considered one of the two most competitive seats held by a Republican and was targeted by Democrats in their aim to regain control of the state Senate. Neville narrowly won the seat in 2014 and Hillary Clinton won the district in the 2016 presidential election. Despite the highly competitive nature of the district, Neville continued to run as a hardline conservative in an area quickly trending Democratic. He previously pushed legislation aimed at restricting abortion and loosening gun laws. Neville's Democratic challenger was Tammy Story, an education reformer. He lost the race by around a 14% margin to Story.

== U.S. Senate candidacy ==
In 2016, Neville was a candidate in the Republican primary for nomination for the U.S. Senate seat currently held by Michael Bennet. He was eliminated at the state convention.

== Family ==
Neville's son, Patrick, used to serve as the Minority Leader of the Colorado House of Representatives.

== Sources ==
- Campaign bio of Tim Neville
