= Cole Wist =

American politician

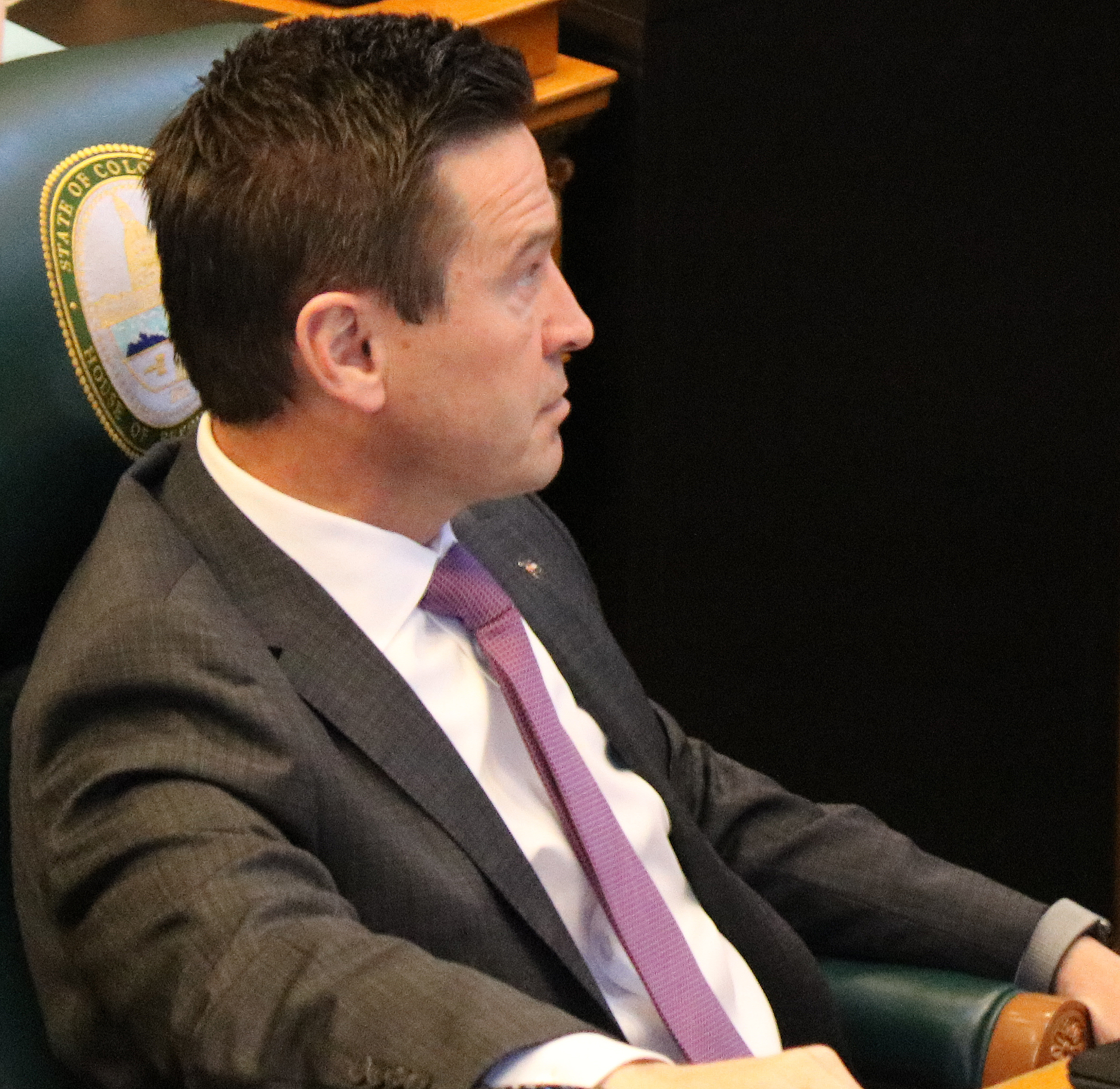
- Wist in 2018.

Member of the Colorado House of Representatives from the 37th district
- In office January 12, 2016 – January 4, 2019
- Preceded by: Jack Tate
- Succeeded by: Tom Sullivan

Personal details
- Born: 24 December 1962 (age 63) Fort Worth, Texas
- Party: Democratic (1996 – ?); Republican (? – 2022); Unaffiliated (2022 – present)
- Spouse: Susan
- Children: Connor; Abby; Halle
- Education: J.D., Georgetown University Law Center, 1988; B.A., University of Denver, 1985
- Profession: Attorney
- Website: colewist.com

Cole Wist is an attorney and former state representative from Arapahoe County, Colorado. A Republican, Wist represented Colorado House of Representatives District 37 and served as Assistant Minority Leader in the House.

== Early life and family ==
Wist was born in Fort Worth, Texas, but he was raised in Paonia, Colorado. He and his wife Susan have three daughters.

== Education ==
Wist earned his undergraduate degree from the University of Denver in 1985. He also holds a J.D. Degree from Georgetown University Law Center. He works as an attorney at Ogletree, Deakins.

== Political career ==
In 1996, Wist ran for the Colorado House of Representatives as a Democrat and lost to Kay Alexander.

Wist was appointed as a Republican to the State House in January 2016 after his predecessor, Jack Tate, resigned to fill a vacant State Senate seat. Wist then ran for the office in the November 2016 general election and won, beating his Democratic challenger with 54.65% of the vote. With Democratic assistant majority leader Alec Garnett, Wist sponsored a red flag bill in 2018. This bill failed, but a similar bill was signed into law during the following session. Wist ran for reelection in 2018 but lost to Democrat Tom Sullivan.

Since leaving the legislature, Wist has criticized Donald Trump and the Republican Party for their handling of the Charlottesville car attack, voting rights, the 2021 United States Capitol attack, and COVID-19 vaccine misinformation. He opposed the efforts of the Rocky Mountain Gun Owners to recall his former rival Tom Sullivan in 2019. During the 2020 presidential election Wist was a steering committee member of The Lincoln Project's Republicans and Independents for Biden group. In January 2022 Wist announced that he was leaving the Republican Party to become unaffiliated.
