= Ruby Dickson =

American politician and economist

Member of the Colorado House of Representatives from the 37th district
- In office January 9, 2023 – December 11, 2023
- Preceded by: Tom Sullivan
- Succeeded by: Chad Clifford

Personal details
- Party: Democratic
- Education: Lawrence University (BA); University of Oxford (MPhil)

Ruby Dickson is an American politician and economist who served as a member of the Colorado House of Representatives, representing the 37th district from January to December 2023.

== Education ==
Dickson earned a Bachelor of Arts degree in economics and Chinese from Lawrence University and a Master of Philosophy in economics from the University of Oxford.

== Career ==
In 2014, Dickson was a legislative assistant for Congressman Jared Polis. From 2016 to 2019, she was a senior consulting analyst at Optum. In 2020 and 2021, she worked as a research assistant at the Blavatnik School of Government. Since 2021, she has worked as a research economist at Rethink Priorities. Dickson was elected to the Colorado House of Representatives in November 2022. On December 1, 2023, she announced that she would resign from the legislature effective December 11, citing the "sensationalistic and vitriolic nature of the current political environment".
