= David Balmer =

American politician

Member of the Colorado Senate from the 27th district
- In office January 15, 2013 – December 31, 2015
- Preceded by: Nancy Spence
- Succeeded by: Jack Tate

Member of the Colorado House of Representatives from the 39th district
- In office January 2005 – January 2013
- Succeeded by: Polly Lawrence

Personal details
- Party: Republican
- Spouse: Karen
- Profession: Consultant

David Balmer is a former legislator in the U.S. of State of Colorado. Elected to the Colorado House of Representatives as a Republican in 2005, he won election to the Colorado Senate in 2012. In late 2015, he resigned his seat representing Senate District 27 which encompasses parts of Arapahoe County.

== Biography and early career ==
From 1994 to 2008, he served in various positions with Cherokee Investment Partners, the nation's largest private equity firm specializing in brownfield redevelopment. Cherokee has purchased over 300 contaminated sites across North America and Europe. Cherokee closed its Denver office in 2008. As a Lt. Colonel in the U.S. Army Reserve, David served in deployments to Afghanistan and Bosnia.

=== 2010 election ===
In 2010, Balmer ran for re-election to House District 39. He faced Carol Levine as his Democratic opponent, and defeated her with 61.1% of the votes.

=== 2011 legislative session ===
Balmer sponsored several measures during the 2011 legislative session, one of which looked to reinstate sales tax exemptions on soft drinks. HB 11-1162 would have given soft drink retailers exemption from the state sales and use tax. The bill passed through the House Finance Committee before the House Appropriations Committee, where the final action to vote failed.

Balmer also headed legislation that would have prohibited current elected officials from being featured in public ads paid for with state funds. The bill passed through the Colorado House of Representatives before being sent to the Senate, where it was assigned to the Senate State, Veterans, and Military Affairs Committee. The bill was put to a vote, but failed to pass on a 3–2 party-line vote.

== Colorado State Senate ==
=== 2012 election ===
After being term-limited in the Colorado House of Representatives, Balmer ran for the Senate seat left open by Senator Nancy Spence who was also term-limited. Balmer ran for election to the Colorado Senate for district 27. He faced no opposition during the primaries, but faced Democratic opponent David Paladino during the general election. Balmer won election to the State Senate with 55.3% of the vote and over 7,000 votes more than his opponent.

=== 2013 legislative session ===
For the 2013 legislative session, Senator Balmer was appointed to the Business, Labor, and Technology Committee, and the Local Government Committee.
