= Chris Kolker =

American politician

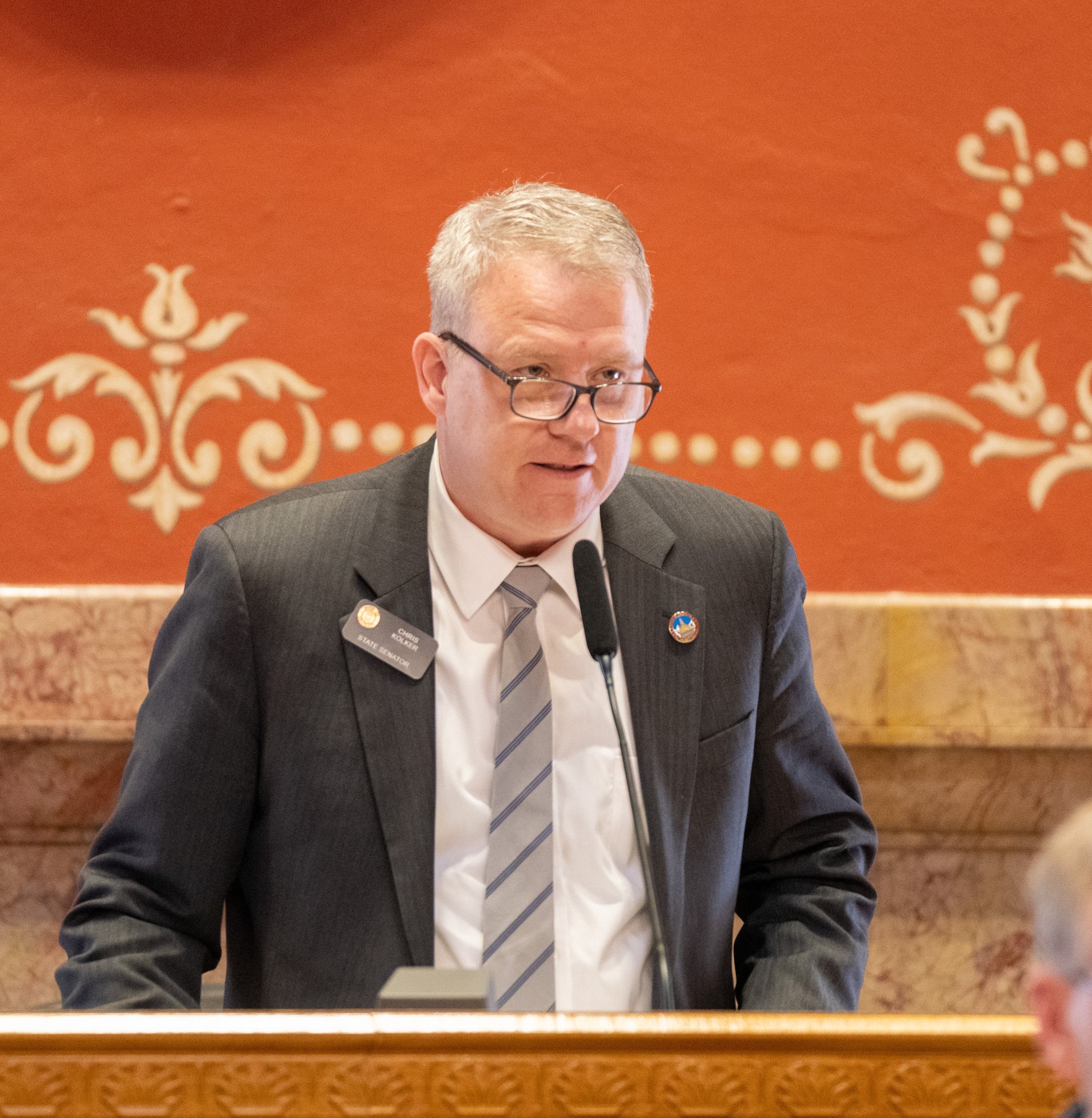

Member of the Colorado Senate from the 16th district
- Incumbent
- Assumed office January 9, 2023
- Preceded by: Redistricted

Member of the Colorado Senate from the 27th district
- In office January 13, 2021 – January 9, 2023
- Preceded by: Jack Tate
- Succeeded by: Redistricted

Personal details
- Party: Democratic

Christopher Edward Kolker (born March 15, 1972) is an American politician and a Democratic member of the Colorado Senate who represents District 16. In the 2022 reapportionment process, his residence moved from senate district 27 to senate district 16, so he began to represent the 16th district in 2023. The district includes all or parts of Centennial, Littleton, Ken Caryl, Columbine and Columbine Valley in Arapahoe and Jefferson counties.

He was first elected to the Colorado State Senate in 2020 to District 27. Kolker was re-elected in 2024. During his tenure, Kolker has focused on behavioral healthcare, economic and tax policies, and public education.

== Background ==
Kolker was born in Guttenberg, Iowa, and worked as a high school teacher before becoming a financial planner. He has run a financial planning business for over a decade. Kolker is married and has two children.
