= Jack Tate (politician) =

American politician

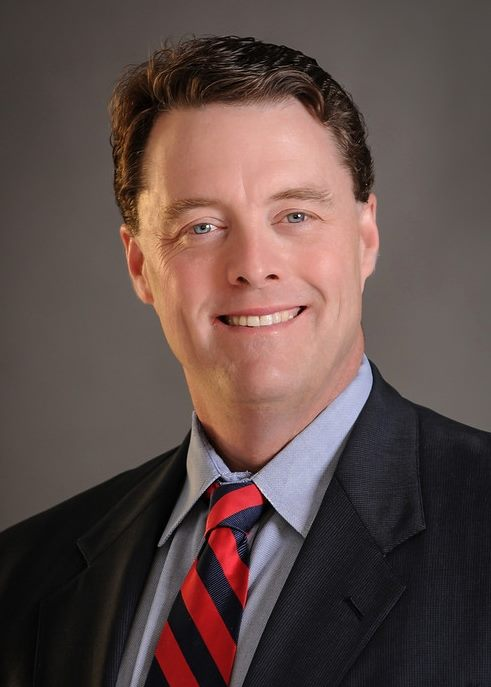

Member of the Colorado Senate from the 27th district
- In office January 5, 2016 – January 13, 2021
- Preceded by: David Balmer
- Succeeded by: Chris Kolker

Member of the Colorado House of Representatives from the 37th district
- In office January 2015 – January 2016
- Preceded by: Spencer Swalm
- Succeeded by: Cole Wist

Personal details
- Born: Nashville, Tennessee
- Party: Republican
- Profession: Politician
- Website: jacktate.org

Jack Tate is a businessman and former Republican legislator in the U.S. State of Colorado. He served both in the state house and state senate. He represented Senate District 27 in the Denver Metro Area, which encompasses parts of unincorporated Arapahoe County, the City of Centennial, and the town of Foxfield. While in the Colorado Senate, he served as Chair of the Senate Committee on Business, Labor, and Technology. He was also a member of the Senate Finance Committee and the Joint Technology Committee, the Pension Reform Commission, the Statutory Revision Committee, the Opioid and Other Substance Use Disorders Interim Study Committee, and the Alternatives to the Gallagher Amendment Interim Study Committee.

== Early life ==
Tate was born and raised in Nashville, Tennessee. He attended Duke University and graduated with a Bachelor of Science Degree in Engineering. He continued his education at Vanderbilt University, the University of Missouri, and the University of Colorado Denver, and obtained a Masters of Science in Finance, and an MBA in Marketing.

== Colorado House of Representatives ==
Tate was a Republican member of the Colorado House of Representatives, representing District 37 from 2014 until his appointment to the state Senate in 2016.

=== 2014 primary and election ===
Tate defeated fellow Republican Michael Fields in a primary election that took place on June 24, with 65.7% of the vote.

In the general election for the Colorado House of Representatives on November 4, 2014, he defeated Democrat Nancy Cronk with 58% of the vote to win District 37.

=== 2015 Legislative Session ===
For the 2015 legislative session, Tate was a member of the House State, Veterans, and Military Affairs Committee, the House Business Affairs and Labor Committee, and the General Assembly Joint Technology Committee. Tate was the prime sponsor of 12 Bills, of which 5 became law and one was vetoed.

- HB15-1197 modified limitations on liability obligations in public construction contracts. The new law provided that public entities may not ask design professionals to defend them in lawsuits unless the design professionals are found negligent.

== Colorado State Senate ==
=== 2015 Appointment ===
In October 2015, Colorado Senator David Balmer announced plans to resign. On December 12, 2015, Republican leaders in District 27 voted Tate as Balmer's replacement.

=== 2016 Legislative Session ===
For the 2016 Legislative session, Tate was appointed to the Business, Labor, & Technology Committee, the Local Government Committee, and the Joint Technology Committee.

Tate introduced 34 bills during the 2016 session and 25 of the bills became law.

=== 2017 Legislative Session ===
For the 2017 Legislative session, Tate was the Chair of the Business, Labor & Technology Committee. He also became a member of the Finance and Statutory Revision Committees. Senator Tate introduced 44 bills during the 2017 session and 33 of the bills became law.

=== 2018 Legislative Session ===
For the 2018 Legislative session, Tate introduced 40 bills during the 2018 session and 33 of the bills became law.

=== 2019 Legislative Session ===
Tate introduced 31 bills during the 2019 session and 22 of the bills became law.

=== 2020 Legislative Session ===
Tate introduced 40 bills during the 2020 session and 27 of the bills became law.

== Sexual harassment allegations ==
In 2017, a formal complaint was filed by a former intern at the Colorado legislature alleging sexual harassment by Tate. The complainant was 18-years-old at the time she said the harassment occurred, and said Tate had nudged her and made inappropriate comments towards her. After the allegations were made, seven women came forward and spoke to the media about Tate's professionalism. After an investigation in 2018, Senate President Kevin Grantham said in a letter that accusations against Tate did not amount to sexual harassment. However, an independent investigation by the Employer’s Council found the accuser to be credible, where Tate's response was not. Tate said he would not be seeking re-election to the Colorado legislature in 2020, citing financial obligations.
