= Colorado's 27th Senate district =

American legislative district

Colorado's 27th State Senate district
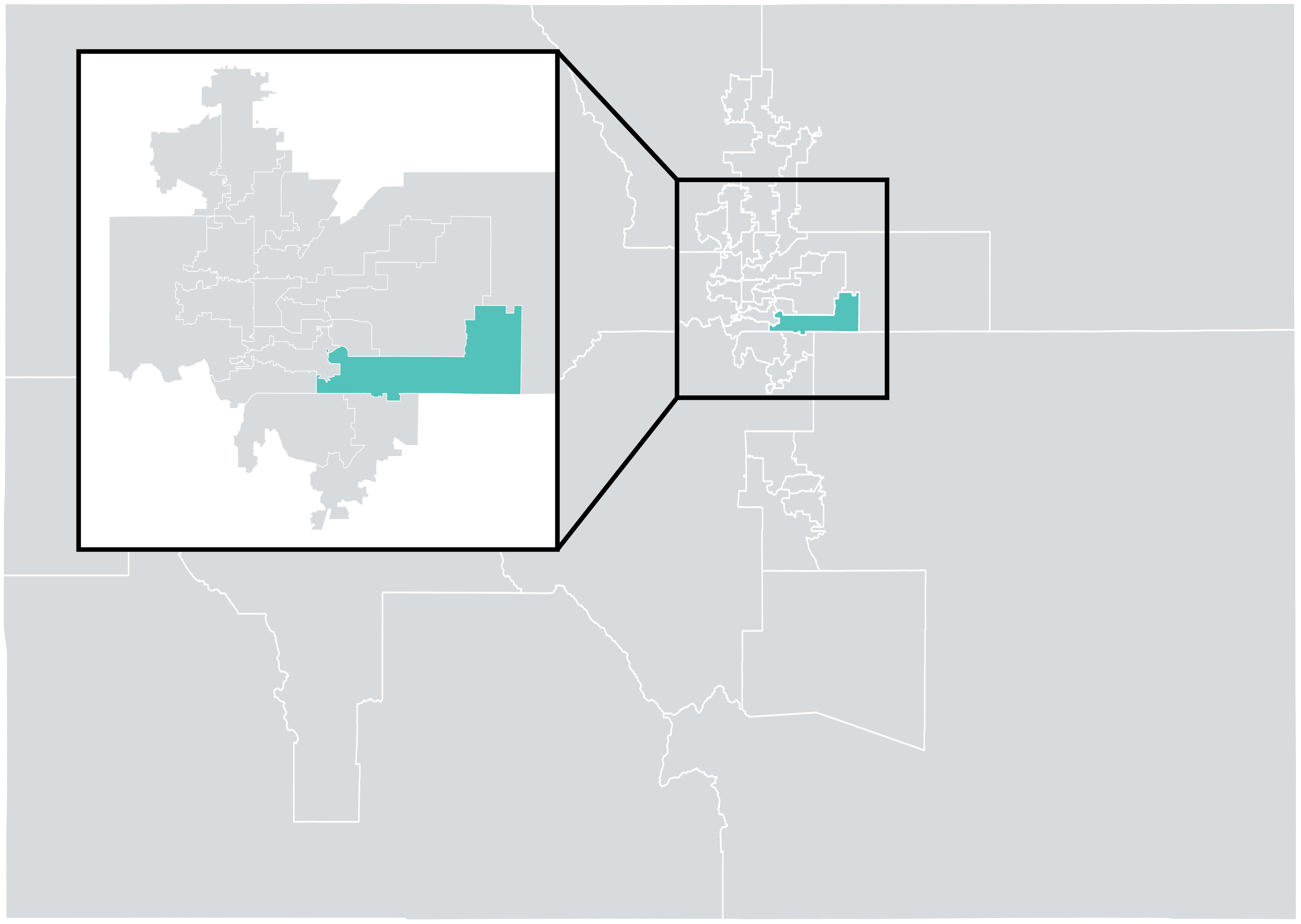
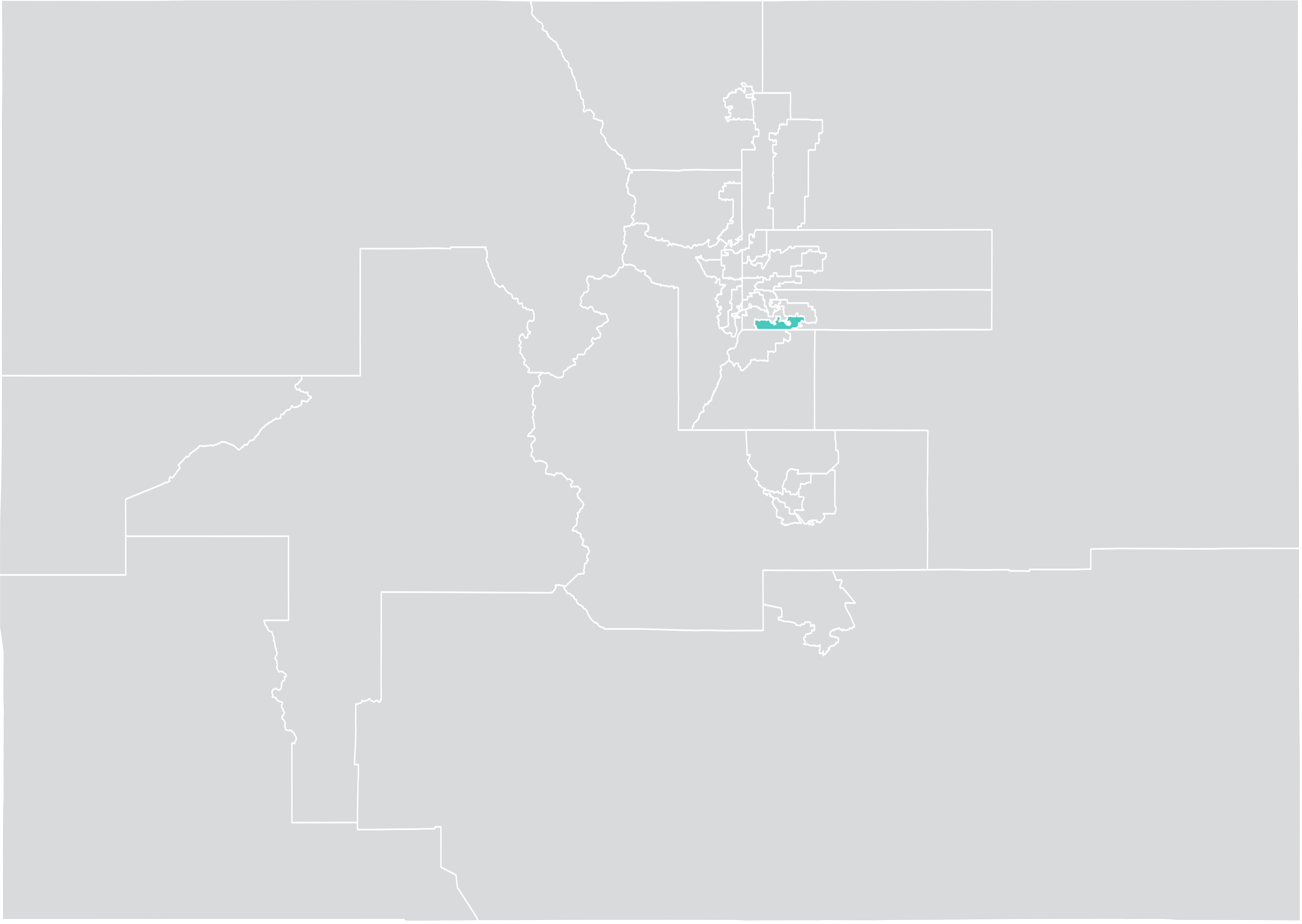
Senator
Tom Sullivan; D–Centennial
- Registration: 25.3% Democratic; 22.7% Republican; 49.9% No party preference
- Demographics: 76% White; 4% Black; 10% Hispanic; 7% Asian; 3% Other
- Population (2018): 153,560
- Registered voters: 113,724

Colorado's 27th Senate district is one of 35 districts in the Colorado Senate. It has been represented by Democrat Tom Sullivan since 2023. Prior to redistricting the district was represented by Democrat Chris Kolker and Republican Jack Tate.

== Geography ==
District 27 is based in Centennial, a suburb of Denver in southern Arapahoe County, and also covers nearby Dove Valley.

The district is located entirely within Colorado's 6th congressional district, and overlaps with the 3rd, 36th, 37th, and 38th districts of the Colorado House of Representatives.

== Recent election results ==
Colorado state senators are elected to staggered four-year terms. The old 27th district held elections in presidential years, but the new district drawn following the 2020 Census will hold elections in midterm years.

=== 2022 ===
The 2022 election will be the first one held under the state's new district lines. Incumbent Senator Chris Kolker was redistricted to the 16th district, which won't be up until 2024; State Rep. Tom Sullivan is running for the 27th district instead.

2022 Colorado State Senate election, District 27
Primary election
Party	Candidate	Votes	%
Republican	Tom Kim	11,215	70.2
Republican	JulieMarie Shepherd Macklin	4,772	29.8
Total votes		15,987	100
General election
Democratic	Tom Sullivan	39,861	54.9
Republican	Tom Kim	32,757	45.1
Write-in		21	0.0
Total votes		72,639	100

== Historical election results ==
=== 2020 ===
2020 Colorado State Senate election, District 27
Party	Candidate	Votes	%
Democratic	Chris Kolker	51,005	55.3
Republican	Suzanne Staiert	41,222	44.7
Total votes		92,227	100
Democratic gain from Republican			

=== 2016 ===
2016 Colorado State Senate election, District 27
Party	Candidate	Votes	%
Republican	Jack Tate	44,169	53.4
Democratic	Tom Sullivan	38,489	46.6
Total votes		82,658	100
Republican hold			

=== 2012 ===
2012 Colorado State Senate election, District 27
Party	Candidate	Votes	%
Republican	David Balmer	42,411	54.8
Democratic	David Paladino	34,957	45.2
Total votes		77,368	100
Republican hold			

=== Federal and statewide results ===
Year	Office	Results
2020	President	Biden 57.7 – 39.6%
2018	Governor	Polis 53.4 – 43.8%
2016	President	Clinton 48.9 – 42.3%
2014	Senate	Gardner 51.8 – 43.8%
2014	Governor	Hickenlooper 48.9 – 48.0%
2012	President	Romney 51.4 – 46.9%
