= Colorado's 16th Senate district =

American legislative district

Colorado's 16th State Senate district
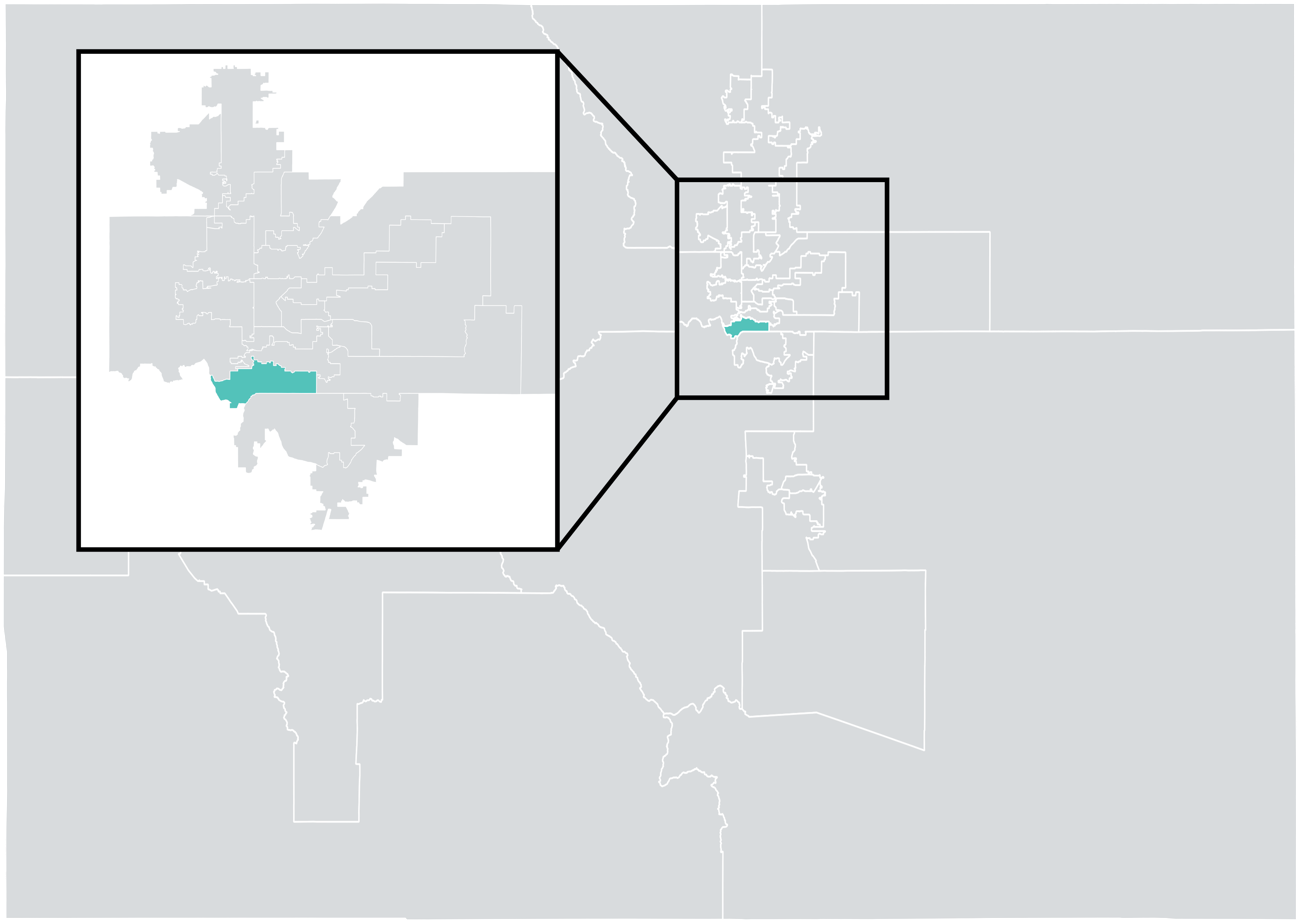
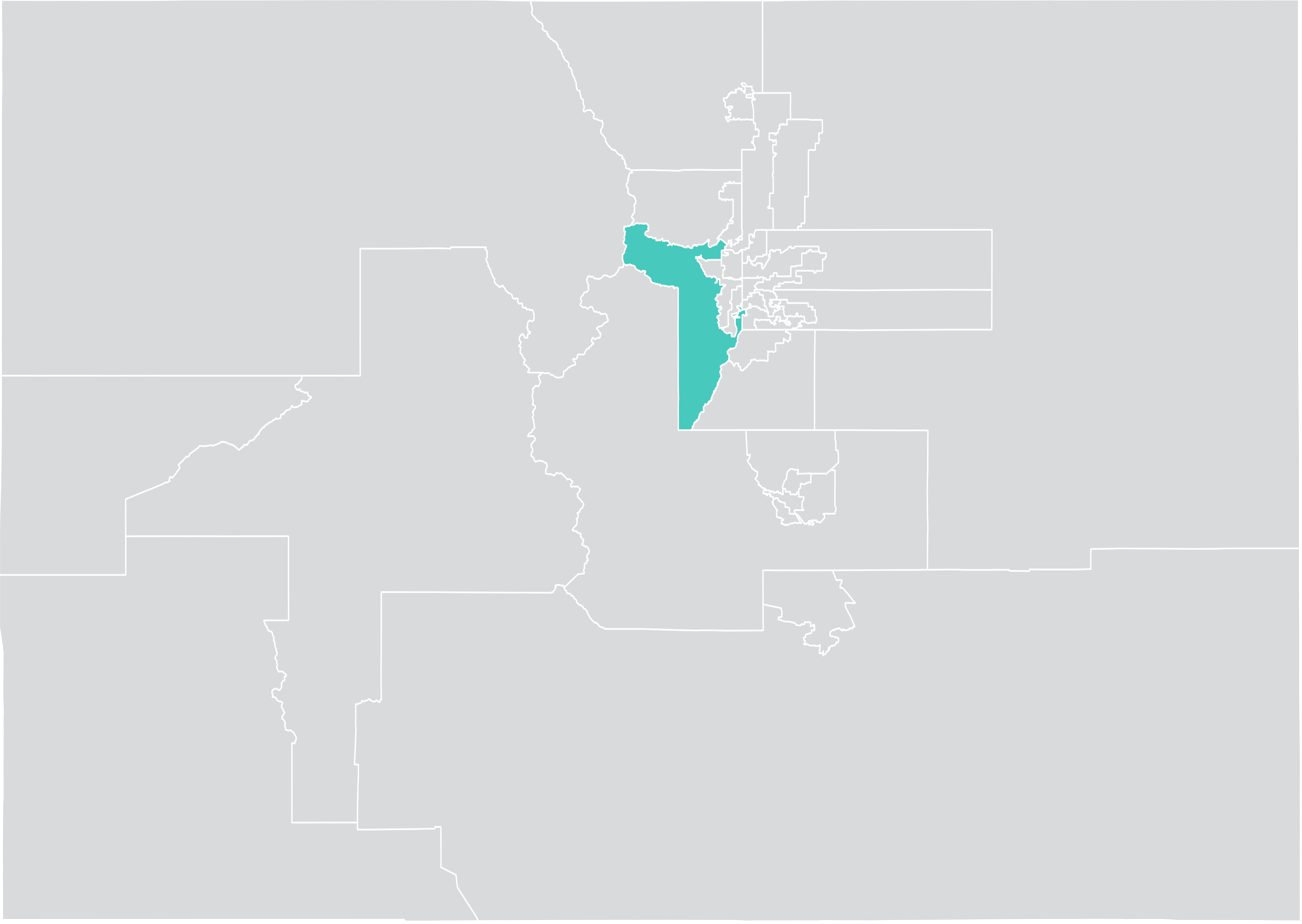
Senator
Chris Kolker; D–Centennial
- Registration: 25.9% Republican; 24.1% Democratic; 48.3% No party preference
- Demographics: 82% White; 1% Black; 11% Hispanic; 4% Asian; 1% Native American; 2% Other
- Population (2018): 153,375
- Registered voters: 121,608

Colorado's 16th Senate district is one of 35 districts in the Colorado Senate. It has been represented by Democrat Chris Kolker since 2023. Prior to redistricting the district was represented by Democrat Tammy Story and Republican Tim Neville.

== Geography ==
District 16 is based in the far western suburbs of Denver, covering all of Gilpin County and parts of Boulder County and Jefferson County, as well as the southwestern corner of Denver proper. Other communities in the district include Superior, Central City, Golden, Evergreen, Conifer, Genesee, Indian Hills, Kittredge, West Pleasant View, and portions of Columbine.

The district overlaps with Colorado's 1st, 2nd, and 7th congressional districts, and with the 1st, 13th, 22nd, 24th, 25th, and 33rd districts of the Colorado House of Representatives.

== Recent election results ==
Colorado state senators are elected to staggered four-year terms. The old 16th district held elections in midterm years, but the new district drawn following the 2020 Census will hold elections in presidential years.

Following redistricting, Senator Tammy Story's home was drawn into the solidly Republican 4th district, and she is seeking a seat in the Colorado House of Representatives in 2022 instead. 27th district Senator Chris Kolker will represent the 16th district from 2022 onwards.

=== 2018 ===
2018 Colorado State Senate election, District 16
Party	Candidate	Votes	%
Democratic	Tammy Story	47,403	55.7
Republican	Tim Neville (incumbent)	35,154	41.3
Libertarian	James Gilman	2,597	3.0
Total votes		85,154	100
Democratic gain from Republican			

=== 2014 ===
2014 Colorado State Senate election, District 16
Party	Candidate	Votes	%
Republican	Tim Neville	35,631	51.4
Democratic	Jeanne Nicholson (incumbent)	33,734	48.6
Total votes		69,365	100
Republican gain from Democratic			

=== Federal and statewide results ===
Year	Office	Results
2020	President	Biden 58.4 – 38.8%
2018	Governor	Polis 55.1 – 41.4%
2016	President	Clinton 49.9 – 41.3%
2014	Senate	Udall 47.6 – 47.3%
2014	Governor	Hickenlooper 51.4 – 44.2%
2012	President	Obama 50.2 – 47.5%
