= 2014 United States Senate election in Colorado =

- November 4, 2014
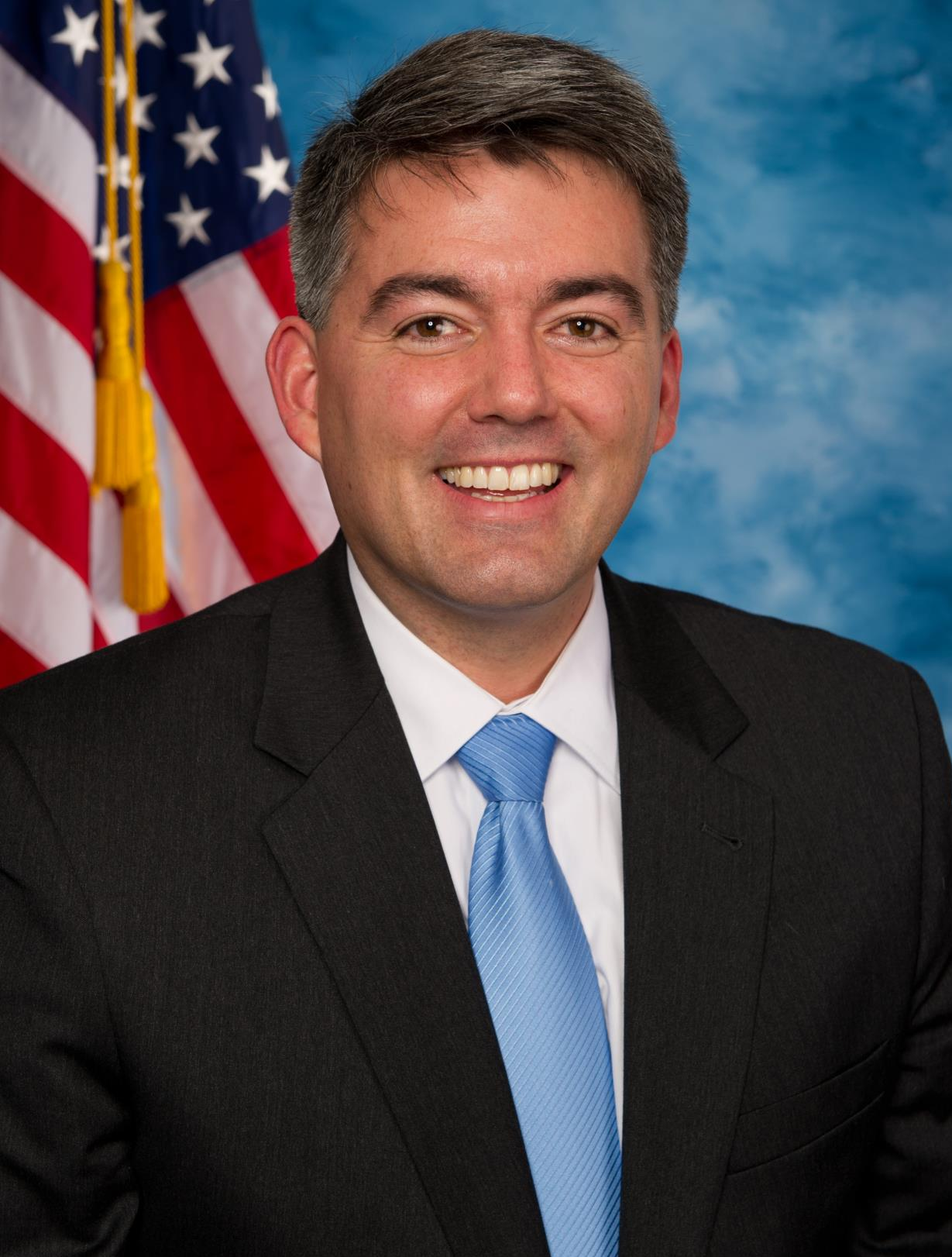

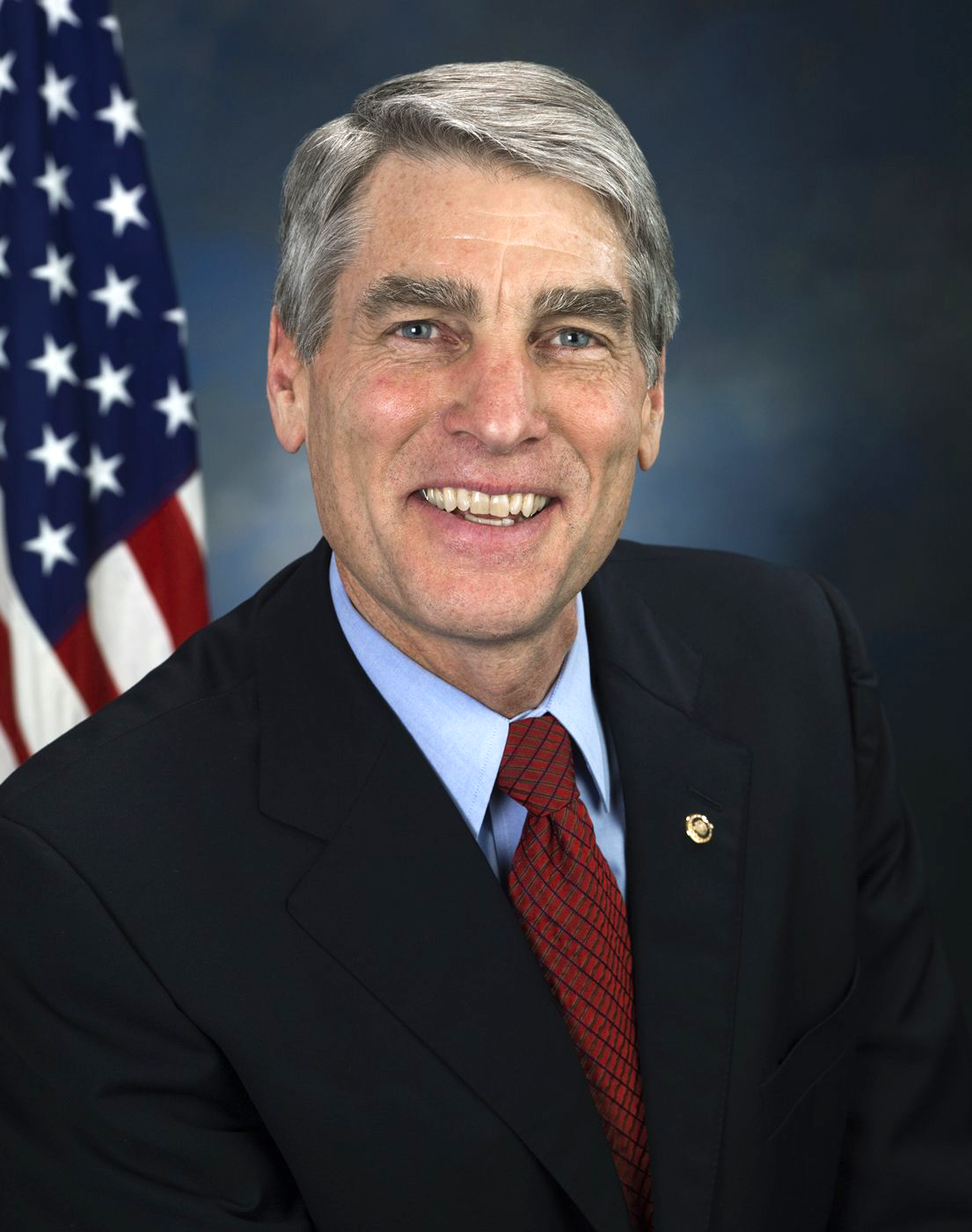
Nominee	Cory Gardner	Mark Udall
Party	Republican	Democratic
Popular vote	983,891	944,203
Percentage	48.21%	46.26%
- Gardner: 40–50% 50–60% 60–70% 70–80% 80–90% >90% Udall: 40–50% 50–60% 60–70% 70–80% 80–90% >90% Tie: 50% No votes
U.S. senator before election
Mark Udall
Democratic
Elected U.S. Senator
Cory Gardner
Republican

The 2014 United States Senate election in Colorado was held on November 4, 2014, to elect a member of the United States Senate to represent the State of Colorado, concurrently with the election of the Governor of Colorado, other elections to the United States Senate, elections to the United States House of Representatives, and various state and local elections. Incumbent Democratic Senator Mark Udall ran for re-election to a second term, but narrowly lost to Republican U.S. Representative Cory Gardner by a margin of 1.9 percent.

Despite Gardner's win however, with slightly over 48% of the vote, it is the lowest a winning Republican had received in the Class 2 Senate seat since 1918. As of 2026, this is the last time that a Republican has won a U.S. Senate race in Colorado.

== Democratic primary ==
Mark Udall was the only Democrat to file to run, and thus at the Democratic state assembly on April 12, 2014, he was renominated unopposed.

=== Candidates ===
==== Nominee ====
- Mark Udall, incumbent U.S. Senator

=== Results ===
Democratic primary results
Party	Candidate	Votes	%
Democratic	Mark Udall (incumbent)	213,746	100.00%
Total votes		213,746	100.00%

== Republican primary ==
At the Republican state assembly on April 12, 2014, Cory Gardner received 73% of the votes of over 3,900 delegates. Neither Randy Baumgardner nor Tom Janich received the required 30% to make the ballot and thus Gardner received the party's nomination.

=== Candidates ===
==== Nominee ====
- Cory Gardner, U.S. Representative

==== Rejected in convention ====
- Randy Baumgardner, state senator
- Tom Janich, perennial candidate

==== Withdrew ====
- Mark Aspiri, businessman
- Ken Buck, Weld County District Attorney and nominee for the U.S. Senate in 2010 (ran for CO-04)
- Owen Hill, state senator
- Jaime McMillan, businessman
- Amy Stephens, state representative
- Floyd Trujillo, businessman

==== Declined ====
- Bob Beauprez, former U.S. Representative and nominee for Governor in 2006 (running for Governor)
- Mike Coffman, U.S. Representative
- Dan Domenico, Solicitor General of Colorado
- Doug Lamborn, U.S. Representative
- Jane Norton, former lieutenant governor of Colorado and candidate for the U.S. Senate in 2010
- Scott Renfroe, state senator
- Victor E. Renuart Jr., former commander of United States Northern Command and the North American Aerospace Defense Command
- Ellen Roberts, state senator
- John Suthers, Attorney General of Colorado
- Scott Tipton, U.S. Representative

=== Endorsements ===
Cory Gardner

Individuals

- Ken Buck, Weld County District Attorney and former candidate for U.S. Senate
- Rick Santorum, former U.S. Senator from Pennsylvania and candidate for President of the United States in 2012
- Amy Stephens, State Representative and former candidate for U.S. Senate

Newspapers

- The Denver Post

=== Polling ===
Poll source	Date(s) administered	Sample size	Margin of error	Mark Aspiri	Randy Baumgardner	Cory Gardner	Owen Hill	Tom Janich	Floyd Trujillo	Other	Undecided
Public Policy Polling	March 13–16, 2014	255	± 6.1%	3%	15%	44%	6%	4%	0%	—	29%

Hypothetical polling

Poll source	Date(s) administered	Sample size	Margin of error	Mark Aspiri	Randy Baumgardner	Ken Buck	Owen Hill	Jaime McMillan	Amy Stephens	Other	Undecided
Public Policy Polling	December 3–4, 2013	335	± 5.2%	0%	8%	45%	2%	1%	7%	—	37%

=== Results ===
Republican primary results
Party	Candidate	Votes	%
Republican	Cory Gardner	338,324	100.00%
Total votes		338,324	100.00%

== Libertarian Party ==
=== Candidates ===
==== Nominated ====
- Gaylon Kent, candidate for Colorado's 3rd congressional district in 2012

== Unity Party of America ==
=== Candidates ===
==== Nominated ====
- Bill Hammons, founder and National Chairman of the Unity Party of America

== Independents ==
=== Candidates ===
==== Declared ====
- Raúl Acosta, IT professional
- Steve Shogan, neurosurgeon

== General election ==
=== Fundraising ===
Candidate	Raised	Spent	Cash on Hand
Mark Udall (D)	$14,088,510	$15,746,249	$536,332
Cory Gardner (R)	$9,680,263	$9,100,730	$1,875,029

=== Debates ===
- Complete video of debate, October 6, 2014
- Complete video of debate, October 15, 2014

=== Predictions ===
Source	Ranking	As of
The Cook Political Report	Tossup	November 3, 2014
Sabato's Crystal Ball	Lean R (flip)	November 3, 2014
Rothenberg Political Report	Tilt R (flip)	November 3, 2014
Real Clear Politics	Tossup	November 3, 2014

=== Polling ===
Poll source	Date(s) administered	Sample size	Margin of error	Mark Udall (D)	Cory Gardner (R)	Other	Undecided
Public Policy Polling	November 1–2, 2014	739	± 3.6%	45%	48%	5%	3%
Public Policy Polling	November 1–2, 2014	739	± 3.6%	47%	50%	—	3%
Quinnipiac University	October 28 – November 2, 2014	815	± 3.4%	43%	45%	7%	4%
Quinnipiac University	October 28 – November 2, 2014	815	± 3.4%	45%	46%	2%	6%
YouGov	October 25–31, 2014	1,417	± 3.3%	42%	43%	5%	11%
Public Policy Polling	October 28–29, 2014	573	± ?	48%	48%	—	4%
SurveyUSA	October 27–29, 2014	618	± 4%	44%	46%	5%	5%
Vox Populi Polling	October 26–27, 2014	642	± 3.9%	43%	46%	—	10%
Quinnipiac University	October 22–27, 2014	844	± 3.4%	39%	46%	8%	7%
Quinnipiac University	October 22–27, 2014	844	± 3.4%	41%	49%	2%	9%
Strategies 360	October 20–25, 2014	604	± 4%	45%	44%	4%	8%
Rasmussen Reports	October 21–23, 2014	966	± 3%	45%	51%	2%	2%
Harstad Strategic Research	October 19–23, 2014	1,004	± ?	44%	43%	6%	6%
CBS News/NYT/YouGov	October 16–23, 2014	1,611	± 4%	47%	46%	1%	6%
NBC News/Marist	October 18–22, 2014	755 LV	± 3.6%	45%	46%	3%	5%
NBC News/Marist	October 18–22, 2014	953 RV	± 3.2%	45%	44%	3%	8%
Suffolk University	October 18–21, 2014	500	± 4.4%	39%	46%	6%	9%
Quinnipiac University	October 15–21, 2014	974	± 3.1%	41%	46%	6%	6%
Quinnipiac University	October 15–21, 2014	974	± 3.1%	44%	48%	2%	7%
Monmouth University	October 17–20, 2014	431	± 4.7%	46%	47%	4%	3%
IPSOS	October 13–20, 2014	1,099	± 3.4%	45%	47%	—	8%
Public Policy Polling	October 16–19, 2014	778	± 3.5%	43%	46%	5%	7%
Public Policy Polling	October 16–19, 2014	778	± 3.5%	44%	47%	—	9%
Gravis Marketing	October 16, 2014	695	± 4%	43%	48%	4%	5%
Benenson Strategy Group	October 15–16, 2014	600	± ?	47%	44%	1%	8%
Mellman Group	October 13–15, 2014	800	± 3.5%	44%	41%	—	15%
CNN/ORC	October 9–13, 2014	665	± 4%	46%	50%	—	4%
Quinnipiac University	October 8–13, 2014	988	± 3.1%	41%	47%	8%	4%
Quinnipiac University	October 8–13, 2014	988	± 3.1%	44%	49%	1%	7%
SurveyUSA	October 9–12, 2014	591	± 4.1%	43%	45%	6%	7%
High Point University	October 4–8, 2014	800	± 3.5%	42%	46%	7%	5%
Fox News	October 4–7, 2014	739	± 3.5%	37%	43%	7%	12%
Greenberg Quinlan Rosner	September 25 – October 1, 2014	1,000	± 2.09%	45%	45%	10%	
CBS News/NYT/YouGov	September 20 – October 1, 2014	1,634	± 3%	48%	45%	1%	6%
Rasmussen Reports	September 29–30, 2014	950	± 3%	47%	48%	2%	3%
Public Policy Polling	September 19–21, 2014	652	± 3.8%	45%	47%	—	8%
ccAdvertising	September 19–21, 2014	2,094	± ?	32%	38%	—	30%
Gravis Marketing	September 16–17, 2014	657	± 4%	39%	46%	6%	9%
Suffolk University	September 9–16, 2014	500	± 4.4%	42%	43%	6%	10%
Quinnipiac	September 10–15, 2014	1,211	± 2.8%	40%	48%	8%	3%
Quinnipiac	September 10–15, 2014	1,211	± 2.8%	42%	52%	1%	5%
Myers	September 7–14, 2014	1,350	± 2.7%	48%	46%	2%	3%
SurveyUSA	September 8–10, 2014	664	± 3.9%	46%	42%	5%	7%
Rasmussen Reports	September 3–4, 2014	800	± 4%	44%	42%	4%	10%
NBC News/Marist	September 2–4, 2014	795 LV	± 3.5%	48%	42%	1%	9%
NBC News/Marist	September 2–4, 2014	976 RV	± 3.1%	48%	40%	1%	11%
CBS News/NYT/YouGov	August 18 – September 2, 2014	1,727	± 4%	46%	43%	2%	9%
CBS News/New York Times	July 5–24, 2014	2,020	± 3%	50%	46%	2%	2%
Public Policy Polling	July 17–20, 2014	653	± 3.8%	44%	43%	—	13%
Quinnipiac	July 10–14, 2014	1,147	± 2.9%	42%	44%	1%	13%
Gravis Marketing	July 7–10, 2014	1,106	± 3%	43%	47%	6%	4%
NBC News/Marist	July 7–10, 2014	914	± 3.2%	48%	41%	2%	10%
Rasmussen Reports	June 25–26, 2014	750	± 4%	43%	42%	6%	9%
Magellan Strategies	June 6–8, 2014	747	± 3.54%	45%	47%	—	8%
Public Policy Polling	May 7–8, 2014	526	± ?	47%	43%	—	10%
Quinnipiac	April 15–21, 2014	1,298	± 2.7%	45%	44%	1%	9%
Public Policy Polling	April 17–20, 2014	618	± ?	47%	45%	—	8%
Fabrizio, Lee & Associates	April 16–17, 2014	600	± 4%	42%	44%	7%	7%
Magellan Strategies	April 14–15, 2014	717	± 3.7%	45%	42%	5%	8%
Harper Polling	April 7–9, 2014	507	± 4.35%	45%	43%	—	12%
Public Policy Polling	March 13–16, 2014	568	± 4.1%	42%	40%	—	17%
Harper Polling	March 8–9, 2014	689	± ?	45%	44%	—	17%
Rasmussen Reports	March 5–6, 2014	500	± 4.5%	42%	41%	5%	13%
Public Policy Polling	April 11–14, 2013	500	± 4.4%	49%	39%	—	12%

Hypothetical polling

Poll source	Date(s) administered	Sample size	Margin of error	Mark Udall (D)	Mark Aspiri (R)	Other	Undecided
Quinnipiac	November 15–18, 2013	1,206	± 2.8%	45%	36%	1%	17%

Poll source	Date(s) administered	Sample size	Margin of error	Mark Udall (D)	Randy Baumgardner (R)	Other	Undecided
Public Policy Polling	March 13–16, 2014	568	± 4.1%	44%	37%	—	19%
Quinnipiac	January 29 – February 2, 2014	1,139	± 2.9%	43%	41%	1%	15%
Public Policy Polling	December 3–4, 2013	928	± 3.2%	47%	40%	—	13%
Quinnipiac	November 15–18, 2013	1,206	± 2.8%	44%	39%	1%	16%

Poll source	Date(s) administered	Sample size	Margin of error	Mark Udall (D)	Bob Beauprez (R)	Other	Undecided
Public Policy Polling	April 11–14, 2013	500	± 4.4%	48%	41%	—	11%

Poll source	Date(s) administered	Sample size	Margin of error	Mark Udall (D)	Ken Buck (R)	Other	Undecided
Hickman Analytics	February 17–20, 2014	400	± 4.9%	46%	42%	—	12%
Quinnipiac	January 29 – February 2, 2014	1,139	± 2.9%	45%	42%	1%	13%
Public Policy Polling	December 3–4, 2013	928	± 3.2%	46%	42%	—	12%
Quinnipiac	November 15–18, 2013	1,206	± 2.8%	45%	42%	1%	12%
Public Policy Polling	June 14–17, 2012	799	± 3.5%	50%	35%	—	15%

Poll source	Date(s) administered	Sample size	Margin of error	Mark Udall (D)	Mike Coffman (R)	Other	Undecided
Public Policy Polling	June 14–17, 2012	799	± 3.5%	48%	39%	—	13%
Public Policy Polling	December 1–4, 2011	793	± 3.5%	48%	34%	—	18%

Poll source	Date(s) administered	Sample size	Margin of error	Mark Udall (D)	Scott Gessler (R)	Other	Undecided
Public Policy Polling	April 11–14, 2013	500	± 4.4%	50%	37%	—	13%

Poll source	Date(s) administered	Sample size	Margin of error	Mark Udall (D)	Owen Hill (R)	Other	Undecided
Public Policy Polling	March 13–16, 2014	568	± 4.1%	43%	38%	—	19%
Quinnipiac	January 29 – February 2, 2014	1,139	± 2.9%	44%	39%	1%	16%
Public Policy Polling	December 3–4, 2013	928	± 3.2%	44%	37%	—	18%
Quinnipiac	November 15–18, 2013	1,206	± 2.8%	45%	39%	1%	16%

Poll source	Date(s) administered	Sample size	Margin of error	Mark Udall (D)	Doug Lamborn (R)	Other	Undecided
Public Policy Polling	June 14–17, 2012	799	± 3.5%	49%	36%	—	15%

Poll source	Date(s) administered	Sample size	Margin of error	Mark Udall (D)	Jaime McMillan (R)	Other	Undecided
Quinnipiac	January 29 – February 2, 2014	1,139	± 2.9%	45%	38%	1%	16%
Quinnipiac	November 15–18, 2013	1,206	± 2.8%	43%	40%	1%	17%

Poll source	Date(s) administered	Sample size	Margin of error	Mark Udall (D)	Jane Norton (R)	Other	Undecided
Public Policy Polling	April 11–14, 2013	500	± 4.4%	49%	38%	—	13%
Public Policy Polling	June 14–17, 2012	799	± 3.5%	48%	38%	—	14%
Public Policy Polling	December 1–4, 2011	793	± 3.5%	50%	33%	—	17%

Poll source	Date(s) administered	Sample size	Margin of error	Mark Udall (D)	Bill Owens (R)	Other	Undecided
Public Policy Polling	June 14–17, 2012	799	± 3.5%	47%	43%	—	10%

Poll source	Date(s) administered	Sample size	Margin of error	Mark Udall (D)	Walker Stapleton (R)	Other	Undecided
Public Policy Polling	April 11–14, 2013	500	± 4.4%	50%	37%	—	13%

Poll source	Date(s) administered	Sample size	Margin of error	Mark Udall (D)	Amy Stephens (R)	Other	Undecided
Quinnipiac	January 29 – February 2, 2014	1,139	± 2.9%	43%	41%	1%	15%
Public Policy Polling	December 3–4, 2013	928	± 3.2%	44%	37%	—	19%
Quinnipiac	November 15–18, 2013	1,206	± 2.8%	45%	38%	1%	16%

Poll source	Date(s) administered	Sample size	Margin of error	Mark Udall (D)	John Suthers (R)	Other	Undecided
Public Policy Polling	April 11–14, 2013	500	± 4.4%	50%	38%	—	12%
Public Policy Polling	June 14–17, 2012	799	± 3.5%	48%	38%	—	14%

Poll source	Date(s) administered	Sample size	Margin of error	Mark Udall (D)	Tom Tancredo (R)	Other	Undecided
Public Policy Polling	April 11–14, 2013	500	± 4.4%	51%	39%	—	11%
Public Policy Polling	June 14–17, 2012	799	± 3.5%	49%	39%	—	11%

Poll source	Date(s) administered	Sample size	Margin of error	Mark Udall (D)	Scott Tipton (R)	Other	Undecided
Public Policy Polling	April 11–14, 2013	500	± 4.4%	50%	37%	—	13%

=== Results ===
United States Senate election in Colorado, 2014
Party	Candidate	Votes	%	±%
Republican	Cory Gardner	983,891	48.21%	+5.72%
Democratic	Mark Udall (incumbent)	944,203	46.26%	−6.54%
Libertarian	Gaylon Kent	52,876	2.59%	N/A
Independent	Steve Shogan	29,472	1.44%	N/A
Independent	Raúl Acosta	24,151	1.18%	N/A
Unity	Bill Hammons	6,427	0.32%	N/A
Total votes		2,041,020	100.00%	N/A
Republican gain from Democratic				

==== By county ====
County	Udall%	Udall#	Gardner%	Gardner#	Others%	Others#	Total
Adams	47.70%	62,296	44.88%	58,614	7.42%	9,703	130,613
Alamosa	47.42%	2,440	45.67%	2,350	6.91%	356	5,146
Arapahoe	48.02%	107,347	46.48%	103,915	5.50%	12,284	223,546
Archuleta	37.23%	2,030	56.90%	3,103	5.87%	320	5,453
Baca	18.99%	353	73.91%	1,374	7.10%	132	1,859
Bent	32.14%	503	60.64%	949	7.22%	113	1,565
Boulder	68.59%	97,612	27.35%	38,931	4.06%	5,778	142,321
Broomfield	48.20%	13,309	46.48%	12,833	5.32%	1,469	27,611
Chaffee	45.21%	4,025	49.35%	4,393	5.44%	489	8,907
Cheyenne	11.75%	122	81.70%	848	6.55%	68	1,038
Clear Creek	50.41%	2,344	42.73%	1,987	6.86%	319	4,650
Conejos	46.78%	1,621	47.88%	1,659	5.34%	185	3,465
Costilla	65.10%	912	28.27%	396	6.63%	93	1,401
Crowley	25.67%	344	65.52%	878	8.81%	118	1,340
Custer	29.41%	740	65.94%	1,659	4.65%	117	2,516
Delta	26.07%	3,504	68.44%	9,199	5.49%	737	13,440
Denver	70.73%	163,783	24.53%	56,789	4.74%	10,981	231,553
Dolores	25.47%	246	67.60%	653	6.93%	67	966
Douglas	32.77%	45,163	62.86%	86,626	4.37%	6,020	137,809
Eagle	54.41%	9,438	40.94%	7,102	4.65%	807	17,347
El Paso	32.09%	73,208	62.01%	141,475	5.90%	13,471	228,154
Elbert	20.52%	2,556	73.34%	9,137	6.14%	766	12,459
Fremont	27.72%	4,773	64.37%	11,085	7.91%	1,363	17,221
Garfield	43.44%	8,387	51.24%	9,894	5.32%	1,028	19,309
Gilpin	50.43%	1,450	40.66%	1,169	8.91%	256	2,875
Grand	41.11%	2,795	53.51%	3,638	5.38%	366	6,799
Gunnison	55.39%	3,840	38.53%	2,671	6.08%	422	6,933
Hinsdale	36.52%	191	58.70%	307	4.78%	25	523
Huerfano	47.04%	1,504	45.32%	1,449	7.64%	244	3,197
Jackson	22.18%	163	72.24%	531	5.58%	41	735
Jefferson	47.28%	121,109	46.94%	120,240	5.78%	14,795	256,144
Kiowa	14.06%	107	80.95%	616	4.99%	38	761
Kit Carson	15.71%	487	78.97%	2,448	5.32%	165	3,100
La Plata	51.80%	11,852	44.47%	10,174	3.73%	853	22,852
Lake	53.69%	1,311	37.10%	906	9.21%	225	2,442
Larimer	47.13%	68,659	47.50%	69,198	5.37%	7,815	145,672
Las Animas	42.77%	2,380	50.38%	2,803	6.85%	381	5,564
Lincoln	16.07%	321	77.93%	1,557	6.00%	120	1,998
Logan	20.61%	1,591	73.34%	5,662	6.05%	467	7,720
Mesa	26.80%	15,410	68.38%	39,313	4.82%	2,768	57,491
Mineral	42.26%	254	50.58%	304	7.16%	43	601
Moffat	16.95%	826	76.47%	3,727	6.58%	321	4,874
Montezuma	34.58%	3,353	59.65%	5,784	5.77%	560	9,697
Montrose	24.45%	4,071	71.52%	11,907	4.03%	671	16,649
Morgan	24.56%	2,164	69.44%	6,119	6.00%	529	8,812
Otero	35.12%	2,332	57.43%	3,814	7.45%	495	6,641
Ouray	50.39%	1,355	45.89%	1,234	3.72%	100	2,689
Park	35.18%	2,827	58.16%	4,673	6.66%	535	8,035
Phillips	18.06%	357	76.68%	1,516	5.26%	104	1,977
Pitkin	69.80%	5,409	27.18%	2,106	3.02%	234	7,749
Prowers	22.28%	887	72.19%	2,874	5.53%	220	3,981
Pueblo	46.73%	27,877	46.22%	27,571	7.05%	4,209	59,657
Rio Blanco	13.27%	361	81.37%	2,214	5.36%	146	2,721
Rio Grande	35.25%	1,566	57.05%	2,534	7.70%	342	4,442
Routt	53.95%	5,639	40.93%	4,278	5.12%	535	10,452
Saguache	54.99%	1,307	36.22%	861	8.79%	209	2,377
San Juan	55.19%	255	39.39%	182	5.42%	25	462
San Miguel	68.35%	2,226	26.71%	870	4.94%	161	3,257
Sedgwick	21.72%	262	70.73%	853	7.55%	91	1,206
Summit	60.33%	6,957	35.08%	4,046	4.59%	529	11,532
Teller	28.03%	3,158	65.12%	7,337	6.85%	772	11,267
Washington	10.05%	237	87.15%	2,055	2.80%	66	2,358
Weld	32.80%	29,785	60.37%	54,823	6.83%	6,203	90,811
Yuma	11.92%	512	85.65%	3,678	2.43%	104	4,294

Counties that flipped from Democratic to Republican

- Chaffee (largest municipality: Salida)
- Conejos (largest municipality: Manassa)
- Garfield (largest municipality: Rifle)
- Grand (largest municipality: Granby)
- Larimer (largest municipality: Fort Collins)
- Las Animas (largest municipality: Trinidad)
- Mineral (largest municipality: Creede)

==== By congressional district ====
Gardner won four of seven congressional districts.

District	Udall	Gardner	Representative
1st	65.67%	29.39%	Diana DeGette
2nd	55.24%	40.07%	Jared Polis
3rd	40.58%	53.94%	Scott Tipton
4th	32.13%	61.95%	Ken Buck
5th	32.14%	61.8%	Doug Lamborn
6th	45.58%	49.16%	Mike Coffman
7th	49.9%	43.45%	Ed Perlmutter

== See also ==
- 2014 United States Senate elections
- 2014 United States elections
- 2014 United States House of Representatives elections in Colorado
- 2014 Colorado gubernatorial election
