= 2014 Colorado gubernatorial election =

- November 4, 2014
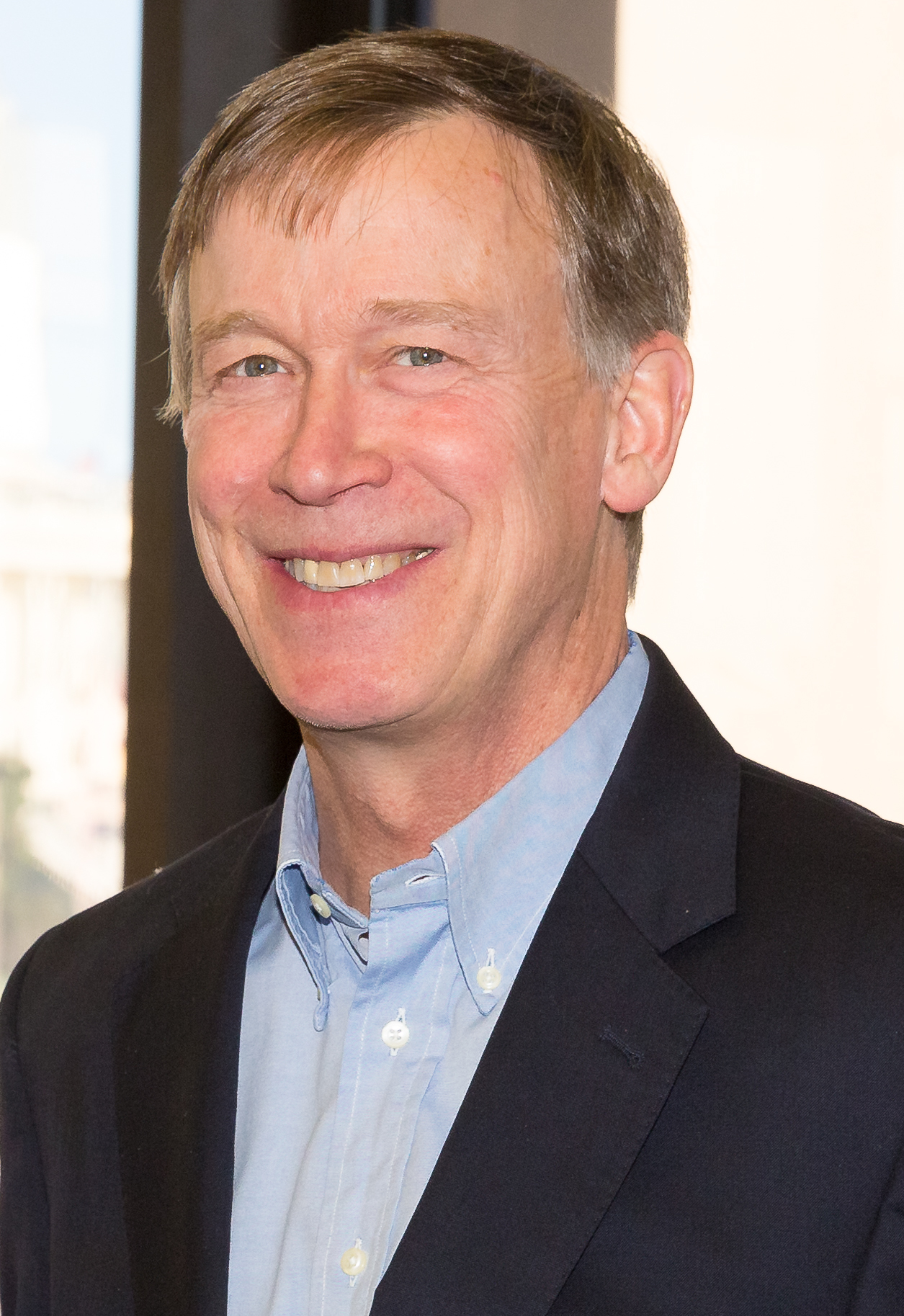

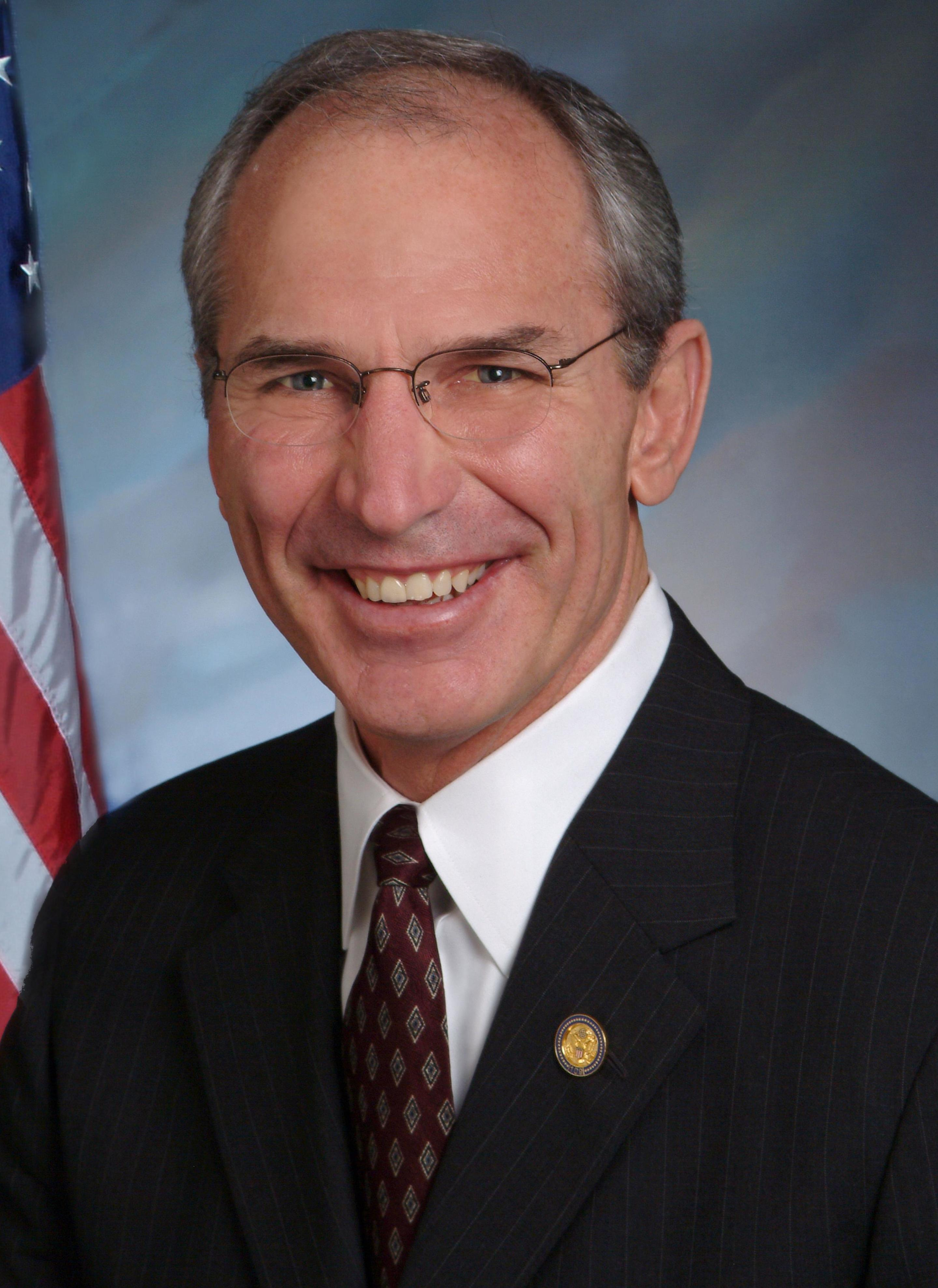
Nominee	John Hickenlooper	Bob Beauprez
Party	Democratic	Republican
Running mate	Joseph Garcia	Jill Repella
Popular vote	1,006,433	938,195
Percentage	49.30%	45.95%
- Hickenlooper: 40–50% 50–60% 60–70% 70–80% Beauprez: 40–50% 50–60% 60–70% 70–80% 80–90%
Governor before election
John Hickenlooper
Democratic
Elected Governor
John Hickenlooper
Democratic

The 2014 Colorado gubernatorial election was held on November 4, 2014, to elect the governor and lieutenant governor of Colorado, concurrently with the election to Colorado's Class II U.S. Senate seat, as well as other elections to the United States Senate in other states and elections to the United States House of Representatives and various state and local elections.

Incumbent Democratic Governor John Hickenlooper and Lieutenant Governor Joseph Garcia were elected to a second term in office, narrowly defeating Republican former U.S. representative Bob Beauprez and his running mate, Douglas County Commissioner Jill Repella, by 68,000 votes.

== Democratic primary ==
John Hickenlooper was the only Democrat to file to run, and thus at the Democratic state assembly on April 12, 2014, he was renominated unopposed.

=== Candidates ===
==== Nominee ====
- John Hickenlooper, incumbent governor

=== Results ===
Democratic primary results
Party	Candidate	Votes	%
Democratic	John Hickenlooper (incumbent)	214,403	100.00
Total votes		214,403	100.00

== Republican primary ==
At the Republican state assembly on April 12, 2014, Mike Kopp and Scott Gessler received 34% and 33% of the votes of over 3,900 delegates, respectively, thus winning a place on the ballot. Greg Brophy, Steve House and Roni Bell Sylvester received 19%, 13% and 2%, respectively, falling short of the 30% needed to qualify for the ballot. Bob Beauprez and Tom Tancredo did not contest the assembly vote, instead petitioning their way onto the ballot.

=== Candidates ===
==== Declared ====
- Bob Beauprez, former U.S. representative and nominee for governor in 2006
- Scott Gessler, Secretary of State of Colorado
- Mike Kopp, former Minority Leader of the Colorado Senate

- Running mate: Vera Ortegon, biologist and former Pueblo City Councillor

- Tom Tancredo, former U.S. representative and Constitution Party nominee for governor in 2010

==== Eliminated at convention ====
- Greg Brophy, state senator
- Steve House, healthcare consultant and Chairman of the Adams County Republican Party
- Roni Bell Sylvester, rancher

==== Withdrew ====
- Jason Clark, money manager and independent candidate for governor in 2010
- Steve Laffey, former mayor of Cranston, Rhode Island and candidate for the U.S. Senate from Rhode Island in 2006 (running for CO-04)

==== Declined ====
- George Brauchler, Arapahoe County District Attorney
- Dan Caplis, radio host
- Cory Gardner, U.S. representative (running for the U.S. Senate)
- Jennifer George, attorney
- Cheri Gerou, state representative
- Victor Mitchell, former state representative
- Ellen Roberts, state senator
- Bob Schaffer, former U.S. representative, candidate for the U.S. Senate in 2004 and nominee for the U.S. Senate in 2008
- Lang Sias, former Navy fighter pilot (running for the State Senate)
- Walker Stapleton, Colorado State Treasurer (running for re-election)
- John Suthers, Colorado Attorney General

=== Endorsements ===
Bob Beauprez
- Wayne Allard, former U.S. senator
- Greg Brophy, state senator
- Pete Coors, Chairman of the Molson Coors Brewing Company, Chairman of MillerCoors, and nominee for U.S. Senate in 2004
- Bob Greenlee, former mayor of Boulder
- Steve House, healthcare consultant and Chairman of the Adams County Republican Party
- Gale Norton, former Colorado Attorney General and former United States Secretary of the Interior
- Bill Owens, former governor of Colorado
- Rick Perry, Governor of Texas
- Mitt Romney, former governor of Massachusetts
- John Suthers, Colorado Attorney General
Greg Brophy

Individuals

- George Brauchler, Arapahoe County District Attorney
- Shayne Heap, Elbert County Sheriff
- Mike May, former Minority Leader of the Colorado House of Representatives
- Ellen Roberts, state senator

Organizations

- Gun Rights Across America
- Rocky Mountain Gun Owners
Scott Gessler
- Ken Bennett, Secretary of State of Arizona
- Eli Bremer, former chairman of the El Paso Republican Party
- Lois Landgraf, state representative
- Mark Martin, Secretary of State of Arkansas
- Ray Martinez, former mayor of Fort Collins
- Clarice Navarro, state representative
- Marcia Neal, member of the Colorado State Board of Education
- Brian Norton, Rio Grande County Sheriff
- George Rivera, state senator
- Bill Roy, former executive director of the El Paso Republican Party
- Bob Schaffer, former U.S. representative
- Lola Spradley, former speaker of the Colorado House of Representatives
- Sam Susuras, Mayor of Grand Junction
- Lou Vallario, Garfield County Sheriff
- Dave Williams, former chairman of the Chaffee County Republican Committee
- Kim Wyman, Secretary of State of Washington
Mike Kopp
- William L. Armstrong, former U.S. senator
- Hank Brown, former U.S. senator
- Jane Norton, former lieutenant governor of Colorado and candidate for U.S. Senate in 2010
- Janet Rowland, former Mesa County Commissioner and nominee for Lieutenant Governor of Colorado in 2006
Roni Bell Sylvester
- Mark Trostel, retired chief of the Colorado State Patrol
Tom Tancredo
- Joe Arpaio, Maricopa County Sheriff
- Michelle Malkin, conservative commentator
- Ted Nugent, musician and gun rights activist

=== Polling ===
Poll source	Date(s) administered	Sample size	Margin of error	Bob Beauprez	Greg Brophy	Scott Gessler	Steve House	Mike Kopp	Jim Rundberg	Roni Bell Sylvester	Tom Tancredo	Other	Undecided
Magellan*	May 28–29, 2014	>900	± 3%	25%	—	13%	—	10%	—	—	27%	—	25%
PPP	March 13–16, 2014	255	± 6.1%	20%	7%	18%	3%	8%	—	1%	24%	—	18%
PPP	December 3–4, 2013	335	± 5.2%	—	9%	15%	2%	3%	3%	—	34%	—	33%

- * Poll for the Bob Beauprez campaign

=== Results ===
Results by county: Beauprez: 20–30%; 30–40%; 40–50%; 50–60%; 60–70%; Tancredo: 20–30%; 30–40%; 40–50%; 50–60%; Gessler: 20–30%; 30–40%; 40–50%; Kopp: 20–30%; 30–40%; 40–50%

Republican primary results
Party	Candidate	Votes	%
Republican	Bob Beauprez	116,333	30.24
Republican	Tom Tancredo	102,830	26.73
Republican	Scott Gessler	89,213	23.19
Republican	Mike Kopp	76,373	19.85
Total votes		384,749	100.00

== Libertarian primary ==
=== Candidates ===
==== Nominee ====
- Matthew Hess, IT systems administrator

== Green primary ==
=== Candidates ===
- Harry Hempy, software engineer and progressive activist

==== Unsuccessful ====
- Bill Bartlett, co-chair of the Green Party of Colorado

== Independents ==
=== Candidates ===
==== Declared ====
- Mike Dunafon, Mayor of Glendale
- Paul N. Fiorino, performing arts teacher and perennial candidate

==== Withdrew ====
- Jim Rundberg, businessman

== General election ==
=== Candidates ===
- Bob Beauprez (R), former U.S. representative and nominee for governor in 2006

- Running mate: Jill Repella, Douglas County Commissioner

- Mike Dunafon (I), Mayor of Glendale

- Running mate: Robin Roberts, president of Pikes Peak National Bank

- Paul Fiorino (I), performing arts teacher, former director of the Pueblo Ballet and Independent candidate for governor in 2006 and 2010

- Running mate: Charles Whitley, retired military, arts advocate and publisher

- Marcus Giavanni (write-in), internet developer, entrepreneur, musician

- Running mate: Joshua Yballa

- Matthew Hess (L), IT systems administrator

- Running mate: Brandon Young, photographer, graphic designer and political activist

- Harry Hempy (G), software engineer and progressive activist

- Running mate: Scott Olson

- John Hickenlooper (D), incumbent governor

- Running mate: Joseph Garcia, incumbent lieutenant governor

=== Debates ===
- Complete video of debate, September 30, 2014 - C-SPAN
- Complete video of debate, October 6, 2014 - C-SPAN
- Complete video of debate, October 24, 2014 - C-SPAN

=== Predictions ===
Source	Ranking	As of
The Cook Political Report	Tossup	November 3, 2014
Sabato's Crystal Ball	Lean D	November 3, 2014
Rothenberg Political Report	Tilt D	November 3, 2014
Real Clear Politics	Tossup	November 3, 2014

=== Polling ===
Poll source	Date(s) administered	Sample size	Margin of error	John Hickenlooper (D)	Bob Beauprez (R)	Other	Undecided
Public Policy Polling	November 1–2, 2014	739	± 3.6%	46%	46%	5%	3%
Public Policy Polling	November 1–2, 2014	739	± 3.6%	48%	49%	—	3%
Quinnipiac University	October 28 – November 2, 2014	815	± 3.4%	43%	45%	7%	6%
Quinnipiac University	October 28 – November 2, 2014	815	± 3.4%	43%	45%	5%	7%
Quinnipiac University	October 28 – November 2, 2014	815	± 3.4%	44%	45%	5%	7%
YouGov	October 25–31, 2014	1,417	± 3.3%	44%	42%	4%	10%
Public Policy Polling	October 28–29, 2014	573	± ?	47%	47%	—	5%
SurveyUSA	October 27–29, 2014	618	± 4%	46%	46%	4%	4%
Vox Populi Polling	October 26–27, 2014	642	± 3.9%	49%	44%	—	7%
Quinnipiac University	October 22–27, 2014	844	± 3.4%	40%	45%	6%	9%
Quinnipiac University	October 22–27, 2014	844	± 3.4%	41%	46%	4%	9%
Quinnipiac University	October 22–27, 2014	844	± 3.4%	40%	45%	5%	9%
Strategies 360	October 20–25, 2014	604	± 4%	46%	43%	2%	8%
Rasmussen Reports	October 21–23, 2014	966	± 3%	47%	49%	1%	3%
CBS News/NYT/YouGov	October 16–23, 2014	1,611	± 4%	48%	44%	1%	7%
NBC News/Marist	October 18–22, 2014	755 LV	± 3.6%	46%	41%	7%	6%
NBC News/Marist	October 18–22, 2014	953 RV	± 3.2%	46%	38%	8%	9%
Suffolk University	October 18–21, 2014	500	± 4.4%	43%	45.4%	3%	7.6%
Quinnipiac University	October 15–21, 2014	974	± 3.1%	45%	44%	4%	7%
Quinnipiac University	October 15–21, 2014	974	± 3.1%	45%	45%	3%	7%
Quinnipiac University	October 15–21, 2014	974	± 3.1%	45%	44%	3%	8%
Monmouth University	October 17–20, 2014	431	± 4.7%	50%	43%	3%	4%
IPSOS	October 13–20, 2014	1,099	± 3.4%	46%	46%	—	8%
Public Policy Polling	October 16–19, 2014	778	± 3.5%	45%	44%	5%	7%
Public Policy Polling	October 16–19, 2014	778	± 3.5%	46%	46%	—	8%
Gravis Marketing	October 16, 2014	695	± 4%	44%	48%	6%	3%
Quinnipiac	October 9–13, 2014	988	± 3.1%	42%	46%	6%	6%
Quinnipiac	October 9–13, 2014	988	± 3.1%	43%	48%	2%	7%
Quinnipiac	October 9–13, 2014	988	± 3.1%	43%	46%	5%	6%
CNN/ORC	October 9–13, 2014	665	± 4%	49%	48%	—	3%
SurveyUSA	October 9–12, 2014	591	± 4.1%	45%	44%	4%	6%
High Point University	October 4–8, 2014	800	± 3.5%	44%	46%	6%	4%
Fox News	October 4–7, 2014	739	± 3.5%	42%	42%	6%	10%
CBS News/NYT/YouGov	September 20 – October 1, 2014	1,634	± 3%	49%	45%	1%	5%
Rasmussen Reports	September 29–30, 2014	950	± 3%	50%	46%	2%	3%
Gravis Marketing	September 16–17, 2014	657	± 4%	43%	48%	5%	4%
Suffolk University	September 13–16, 2014	500	± 4.4%	43%	40.8%	6%	10.2%
Quinnipiac	September 10–15, 2014	1,211	± 2.8%	40%	50%	7%	3%
Quinnipiac	September 10–15, 2014	1,211	± 2.8%	40%	52%	4%	4%
Quinnipiac	September 10–15, 2014	1,211	± 2.8%	41%	51%	5%	3%
Myers	September 7–14, 2014	1,350	± 2.7%	51%	44%	1%	4%
SurveyUSA	September 8–10, 2014	664	± 3.9%	45%	43%	7%	5%
Rasmussen Reports	September 3–4, 2014	800	± 3.5%	44%	45%	4%	7%
NBC News/Marist	September 2–4, 2014	795 LV	± 3.5%	43%	39%	9%	9%
NBC News/Marist	September 2–4, 2014	976 RV	± 3.1%	43%	36%	9%	10%
CBS News/NYT/YouGov	August 18 – September 2, 2014	1,727	± 4%	45%	45%	2%	8%
CBS News/NYT/YouGov	July 5–24, 2014	2,020	± 3%	47%	47%	2%	3%
Public Policy Polling	July 17–20, 2014	653	± 3.8%	44%	43%	—	12%
Quinnipiac	July 10–14, 2014	1,147	± 2.9%	43%	44%	3%	10%
Gravis Marketing	July 8–10, 2014	1,106	± 3%	49%	43%	6%	3%
NBC News/Marist	July 7–10, 2014	914	± 3.2%	49%	43%	1%	7%
Rasmussen Reports	June 25–26, 2014	750	± 4%	44%	44%	4%	8%
Public Policy Polling	April 17–20, 2014	618	± ?	48%	41%	—	11%
Quinnipiac	April 15–21, 2014	1,298	± 2.7%	48%	39%	1%	12%
Magellan Strategies	April 14–15, 2014	717	± 3.7%	50%	35%	10%	5%
Public Policy Polling	March 13–16, 2014	568	± 4.1%	48%	38%	—	14%
Public Policy Polling	April 11–14, 2013	500	± 4.4%	50%	43%	—	6%

Hypothetical polling

Poll source	Date(s) administered	Sample size	Margin of error	John Hickenlooper (D)	Greg Brophy (R)	Other	Undecided
Public Policy Polling	March 13–16, 2014	568	± 4.1%	48%	33%	—	18%
Rasmussen Reports	March 5–6, 2014	500	± 4.5%	42%	33%	8%	17%
Quinnipiac	January 29 – February 2, 2014	1,139	± 2.9%	47%	37%	1%	14%
Public Policy Polling	December 3–4, 2013	928	± 3.2%	44%	43%	—	12%
Quinnipiac	November 15–18, 2013	1,206	± 2.8%	44%	38%	2%	16%
Quinnipiac	August 15–21, 2013	1,184	± 2.9%	47%	42%	1%	11%
Quinnipiac	June 5–10, 2013	1,065	± 3%	43%	37%	2%	18%

Poll source	Date(s) administered	Sample size	Margin of error	John Hickenlooper (D)	Cory Gardner (R)	Other	Undecided
Public Policy Polling	April 11–14, 2013	500	± 4.4%	51%	40%	—	9%

Poll source	Date(s) administered	Sample size	Margin of error	John Hickenlooper (D)	Scott Gessler (R)	Other	Undecided
Public Policy Polling	April 17–20, 2014	618	± ?	48%	41%	—	12%
Quinnipiac	April 15–21, 2014	1,298	± 2.7%	48%	38%	1%	13%
Public Policy Polling	March 13–16, 2014	568	± 4.1%	48%	36%	—	16%
Rasmussen Reports	March 5–6, 2014	500	± 4.5%	44%	38%	8%	11%
Quinnipiac	January 29 – February 2, 2014	1,139	± 2.9%	46%	40%	1%	12%
Public Policy Polling	December 3–4, 2013	928	± 3.2%	47%	40%	—	12%
Quinnipiac	November 15–18, 2013	1,206	± 2.8%	45%	40%	1%	14%
Quinnipiac	August 15–21, 2013	1,184	± 2.9%	47%	42%	1%	11%
Quinnipiac	June 5–10, 2013	1,065	± 3%	42%	40%	2%	16%
Public Policy Polling	April 11–14, 2013	500	± 4.4%	50%	40%	—	11%

Poll source	Date(s) administered	Sample size	Margin of error	John Hickenlooper (D)	Mike Kopp (R)	Other	Undecided
Quinnipiac	April 15–21, 2014	1,298	± 2.7%	47%	38%	1%	14%
Public Policy Polling	March 13–16, 2014	568	± 4.1%	49%	32%	—	19%
Quinnipiac	January 29 – February 2, 2014	1,139	± 2.9%	47%	38%	2%	13%
Public Policy Polling	December 3–4, 2013	928	± 3.2%	45%	37%	—	17%
Quinnipiac	November 15–18, 2013	1,206	± 2.8%	44%	40%	2%	14%

Poll source	Date(s) administered	Sample size	Margin of error	John Hickenlooper (D)	Jane Norton (R)	Other	Undecided
Public Policy Polling	April 11–14, 2013	500	± 4.4%	50%	39%	—	12%

Poll source	Date(s) administered	Sample size	Margin of error	John Hickenlooper (D)	Walker Stapleton (R)	Other	Undecided
Public Policy Polling	April 11–14, 2013	500	± 4.4%	49%	38%	—	18%

Poll source	Date(s) administered	Sample size	Margin of error	John Hickenlooper (D)	John Suthers (R)	Other	Undecided
Public Policy Polling	April 11–14, 2013	500	± 4.4%	49%	39%	—	11%

Poll source	Date(s) administered	Sample size	Margin of error	John Hickenlooper (D)	Tom Tancredo (R)	Other	Undecided
Public Policy Polling	April 17–20, 2014	618	± ?	50%	41%	—	10%
Quinnipiac	April 15–21, 2014	1,298	± 2.7%	47%	40%	1%	11%
Public Policy Polling	March 13–16, 2014	568	± 4.1%	50%	36%	—	13%
Hickman Analytics	February 17–20, 2014	400	± 4.9%	51%	40%	—	9%
Rasmussen Reports	March 5–6, 2014	500	± 4.5%	46%	37%	8%	9%
Quinnipiac	January 29 – February 2, 2014	1,139	± 2.9%	48%	39%	1%	11%
Public Policy Polling	December 3–4, 2013	928	± 3.2%	48%	40%	—	12%
Quinnipiac	November 15–18, 2013	1,206	± 2.8%	46%	41%	1%	12%
Quinnipiac	August 15–21, 2013	1,184	± 2.9%	46%	45%	1%	9%
A.L.G. Research	June 27–30, 2013	400	± ?	51%	40%	0%	9%
Quinnipiac	June 5–10, 2013	1,065	± 3%	42%	41%	2%	14%
Public Policy Polling	April 11–14, 2013	500	± 4.4%	52%	41%	—	7%

Poll source	Date(s) administered	Sample size	Margin of error	John Hickenlooper (D)	Scott Tipton (R)	Other	Undecided
Public Policy Polling	April 11–14, 2013	500	± 4.4%	50%	40%	—	10%

=== Results ===
Throughout the night, the race was very close. With 90% of the vote in, Beauprez was about 3,000 votes ahead. The Democrats were holding out hope that Jefferson County would edge them out. When 96% of the vote had reported, Hickenlooper prevailed. Beauprez conceded defeat at 5:48 am on the morning of November 6.

County Flips: Democratic Hold / Republican Hold Flip

2014 Colorado gubernatorial election
Party	Candidate	Votes	%	±%
Democratic	John Hickenlooper (incumbent)	1,006,433	49.30%	−1.76%
Republican	Bob Beauprez	938,195	45.95%	+34.81%
Libertarian	Matthew Hess	39,590	1.94%	+1.19%
Green	Harry Hempy	27,391	1.34%	—
Independent	Mike Dunafon	24,042	1.18%	—
Independent	Paul Noel Fiorino	5,923	0.29%	—
Write-ins		31	0.00%	—
Majority		68,238	3.34%	−11.33%
Turnout		2,041,605		
Democratic hold				

==== Results by county ====
Despite losing the state, Beauprez won 39 of 64 counties.

County	John Hickenlooper Democratic		Bob Beauprez Republican		Various candidates Other parties		Margin		Total
County	#	%	#	%	#	%	#	%	Total
Adams	65,450	50.11%	58,011	44.41%	7,145	5.48%	7,439	5.70%	130,606
Alamosa	2,632	50.94%	2,238	43.31%	297	5.75%	394	7.63%	5,167
Arapahoe	116,445	52.01%	98,374	43.93%	9,080	4.06%	18,071	8.08%	223,899
Archuleta	2,153	39.42%	3,032	55.52%	276	5.06%	-879	-16.10%	5,461
Baca	406	21.76%	1,354	72.56%	106	5.68%	-948	-50.80%	1,866
Bent	548	34.68%	937	59.30%	95	6.02%	-389	-24.62%	1,580
Boulder	96,565	68.12%	36,868	26.01%	8,327	5.87%	59,697	42.11%	141,760
Broomfield	14,100	51.07%	12,240	44.33%	1,270	4.60%	1,860	6.74%	27,610
Chaffee	4,211	47.14%	4,306	48.20%	416	4.66%	-95	-1.06%	8,933
Cheyenne	165	15.91%	814	78.49%	58	5.60%	-649	-62.58%	1,037
Clear Creek	2,455	52.43%	1,967	42.01%	260	5.56%	488	10.42%	4,682
Conejos	1,727	49.41%	1,642	46.98%	126	3.61%	85	2.43%	3,495
Costilla	941	66.31%	401	28.26%	77	5.43%	540	38.05%	1,419
Crowley	336	25.13%	884	66.12%	117	8.75%	-548	-40.99%	1,337
Custer	765	30.33%	1,656	65.66%	101	4.01%	-891	-35.33%	2,522
Delta	3,944	29.30%	8,801	65.38%	716	5.32%	-4,857	-36.08%	13,461
Denver	172,290	74.27%	50,257	21.66%	9,438	4.07%	122,033	52.61%	231,985
Dolores	280	28.83%	635	65.39%	56	5.78%	-355	-36.56%	971
Douglas	52,187	37.76%	81,706	59.13%	4,293	3.11%	-29,519	-21.37%	138,186
Eagle	10,253	58.91%	6,449	37.05%	702	4.04%	3,804	21.86%	17,404
El Paso	76,678	33.65%	139,140	61.06%	12,060	5.29%	-62,462	-27.41%	227,878
Elbert	2,797	22.38%	9,099	72.82%	599	4.80%	-6,302	-50.44%	12,495
Fremont	4,927	28.62%	11,121	64.60%	1,166	6.78%	-6,194	-35.98%	17,214
Garfield	8,840	45.63%	9,583	49.47%	949	4.90%	-743	-3.84%	19,372
Gilpin	1,441	49.74%	1,198	41.35%	258	8.91%	243	8.39%	2,897
Grand	3,020	44.15%	3,525	51.53%	295	4.32%	-505	-7.38%	6,840
Gunnison	3,960	57.09%	2,562	36.93%	414	5.98%	1,398	20.16%	6,936
Hinsdale	203	39.19%	295	56.95%	20	3.86%	-92	-17.76%	518
Huerfano	1,548	48.48%	1,445	45.25%	200	6.27%	103	3.23%	3,193
Jackson	164	21.52%	575	75.46%	23	3.02%	-411	-53.94%	762
Jefferson	130,196	50.77%	114,398	44.61%	11,843	4.62%	15,798	6.16%	256,437
Kiowa	113	14.93%	604	79.79%	40	5.28%	-491	-64.86%	757
Kit Carson	647	20.89%	2,327	75.14%	123	3.97%	-1,680	-54.25%	3,097
La Plata	12,017	52.74%	9,658	42.39%	1,109	4.87%	2,359	10.35%	22,784
Lake	1,385	56.00%	903	36.51%	185	7.49%	482	19.49%	2,473
Larimer	72,550	50.08%	65,054	44.91%	7,247	5.01%	7,496	5.17%	144,851
Las Animas	2,562	45.86%	2,721	48.71%	303	5.43%	-159	-2.85%	5,586
Lincoln	406	20.09%	1,525	75.46%	90	4.45%	-1,119	-55.37%	2,021
Logan	2,027	26.08%	5,438	69.96%	308	3.96%	-3,411	-43.88%	7,773
Mesa	19,859	34.30%	35,236	60.86%	2,803	4.84%	-15,377	-26.56%	57,898
Mineral	277	45.86%	294	48.67%	33	5.47%	-17	-2.81%	604
Moffat	853	17.47%	3,794	77.71%	235	4.82%	-2,941	-60.24%	4,882
Montezuma	3,383	35.02%	5,672	58.71%	605	6.27%	-2,289	-23.69%	9,660
Montrose	4,971	29.93%	10,907	65.66%	732	4.41%	-5,936	-35.73%	16,610
Morgan	2,646	29.86%	5,861	66.15%	353	3.99%	-3,215	-36.29%	8,860
Otero	2,599	38.81%	3,714	55.46%	383	5.73%	-1,115	-16.65%	6,696
Ouray	1,434	53.55%	1,151	42.98%	93	3.47%	283	10.57%	2,678
Park	2,958	36.73%	4,624	57.41%	472	5.86%	-1,666	-20.68%	8,054
Phillips	477	22.42%	1,442	72.31%	75	5.27%	-965	-49.89%	1,994
Pitkin	5,505	71.59%	1,877	24.41%	307	4.00%	3,628	47.18%	7,689
Prowers	1,052	26.42%	2,728	68.52%	201	5.06%	-1,676	-42.10%	3,981
Pueblo	29,591	49.67%	26,696	44.81%	3,281	5.52%	2,895	4.86%	59,568
Rio Blanco	434	15.98%	2,166	79.78%	115	4.24%	-1,732	-63.80%	2,715
Rio Grande	1,800	40.18%	2,437	54.40%	243	5.42%	-637	-14.22%	4,480
Routt	6,092	58.13%	4,005	38.21%	383	3.66%	2,087	19.92%	10,480
Saguache	1,312	54.99%	860	36.04%	214	8.97%	452	18.95%	2,386
San Juan	243	54.12%	177	39.42%	29	6.46%	66	14.70%	449
San Miguel	2,190	67.53%	821	25.32%	232	7.15%	1,369	42.21%	3,243
Sedgwick	342	28.29%	806	66.66%	61	5.05%	-464	-38.37%	1,209
Summit	7,306	63.45%	3,705	32.18%	503	4.37%	3,601	31.27%	11,514
Teller	3,241	28.67%	7,364	65.15%	698	6.18%	-4,123	-36.48%	11,303
Washington	365	15.50%	1,915	81.31%	75	3.19%	-1,550	-65.81%	2,355
Weld	33,375	36.77%	52,844	58.21%	4,555	5.02%	-19,469	-21.44%	90,774
Yuma	794	18.65%	3,356	78.81%	108	2.54%	-2,562	-60.16%	4,258
Totals	1,006,433	49.30%	938,195	45.95%	96,977	4.75%	68,328	3.35%	2,041,605

==== Counties that flipped from Democratic to Republican ====
- Archuleta (largest city: Pagosa Springs)
- Bent (largest city: Las Animas)
- Chaffee (largest city: Salida)
- Crowley (largest city: Ordway)
- Garfield (largest municipality: Glenwood Springs)
- Grand (largest city: Granby)
- Hinsdale (largest city: Lake City)
- Jackson (largest city: Walden)
- Las Animas (largest city: Trinidad)
- Mineral (largest city: Creede)
- Otero (largest city: La Junta)
- Rio Grande (largest city: Monte Vista)
- Sedgwick (largest city: Julesburg)

==== Counties that flipped from Constitution to Republican ====
- Baca (largest city: Springfield)
- Cheyenne (largest city: Cheyenne Wells)
- Custer (largest city: Silver Cliff)
- Delta (largest city: Delta)
- Douglas (largest city: Highlands Ranch)
- Elbert (largest city: Elizabeth)
- El Paso (largest city: Colorado Springs)
- Fremont (largest city: Canon City)
- Kiowa (largest city: Eads)
- Kit Carson (largest city: Burlington)
- Lincoln (largest city: Limon)
- Logan (largest city: Sterling)
- Mesa (largest city: Grand Junction)
- Moffat (largest city: Craig)
- Montrose (largest city: Montrose)
- Morgan (largest city: Fort Morgan)
- Park (largest city: Fairplay)
- Phillips (largest city: Holyoke)
- Prowers (largest city: Lamar)
- Rio Blanco (largest city: Meeker)
- Teller (largest city: Woodland Park)
- Washington (largest city: Akron)
- Weld (largest city: Greeley)
- Yuma (largest city: Yuma)

==== By congressional district ====
Hickenlooper won four of seven congressional districts, including one held by a Republican.

District	Hickenlooper	Beauprez	Representative
1st	69.38%	26.49%	Diana DeGette
2nd	57.12%	37.83%	Jared Polis
3rd	44.2%	50.77%	Scott Tipton
4th	35.94%	59.48%	Ken Buck
5th	33.63%	60.96%	Doug Lamborn
6th	49.71%	46.49%	Mike Coffman
7th	52.73%	42.07%	Ed Perlmutter

== See also ==
- 2014 Colorado elections
