= Wesley Clark 2004 presidential campaign =

American political campaign

Wesley Clark for President
- Campaign: U.S. presidential election, 2004
- Candidate: Wesley Clark; U.S. Army General (1966–2000)
- Affiliation: Democratic Party
- Announced: September 17, 2003
- Suspended: February 11, 2004

Website
- clark04.com (archived - February 6, 2004)

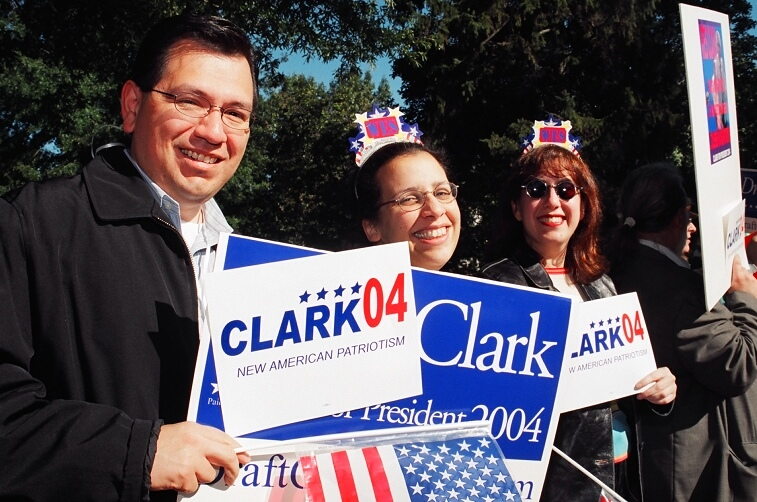
Clark supporters

The 2004 presidential campaign of Wesley Clark, a retired U.S. Army general who served as Supreme Allied Commander Europe (SACE) from 1997 to 2000, officially began on September 17, 2003. A movement to draft Clark for the Democratic nomination began in April 2003, and was led by activists who felt Clark's military service and criticism of the War in Iraq made him a strong candidate. Prior to announcing his campaign, Clark was not known to have publicly identified with either party.

Clark's candidacy was met with strong early support among Democrats, with polling taken in fall 2003 showing Clark as a leading candidate for the nomination. However, after losing several crucial early primary states, Clark ended up dropping out of the race on February 11, 2004. On February 13, 2004, Clark endorsed John Kerry at a rally in Madison, Wisconsin.

== Background ==
Wesley Clark stated that he began to truly define his politics only after his military retirement in 2000 around the 2000 presidential election that would give George W. Bush the presidency. Clark had a conversation with Condoleezza Rice, where she told him that the war in Kosovo would have never taken place under a Bush administration, as they adhered more to realpolitik.

Clark found such an administration unsettling, as he had been selected for the SACEUR position because he believed more in the interventionist policies of the Clinton administration. He said he would see it as a sign that things were "starting to go wrong" with American foreign policy if Bush was elected.

== Preparations ==
Clark met with a group of wealthy New York Democrats including Alan Patricof to tell them he was considering running for the presidency in the 2004 election. Patricof, a supporter of Al Gore in 2000, met with all the Democratic candidates and ultimately supported Clark in 2004. Clark has said that he voted for Al Gore in 2000, but has voted for Republicans such as Ronald Reagan, held equal esteem for Dwight D. Eisenhower and Harry S. Truman, and had been a registered independent voter throughout his military career. Ultimately as Clark himself put it, however, he decided he was a Democrat because "I was pro-affirmative action, I was pro-choice, I was pro-education... I'm pro-health care... I realized I was either going to be the loneliest Republican in America or I was going to be a happy Democrat." Clark said he liked the Democratic party, which he saw as standing for "internationalism", "ordinary men and women", and "fair play".

A "Draft Clark" campaign began to grow with the launch of DraftWesleyClark.com on April 10, 2003. DraftWesleyClark signed up tens of thousands of volunteers, made 150 media appearances discussing Clark, and raised $1.5 million in pledges for his campaign. DraftClark2004.com, another website in support of drafting Clark, was the first organization to register as a political action committee in June 2003 to persuade Clark to run. They had earlier presented him with 1000 emails in May 2003 from throughout the country asking Clark to run. One of DraftClark2004's founders, Brent Blackaby, said of the draft effort: "Just fifty-two years ago citizens from all over the country were successful in their efforts to draft General Eisenhower. We intend to do the same in 2004 by drafting General Clark. If he runs, he wins."

Clark spent time during these early stages of the draft movement deciding whether to run, a decision he said was based heavily on deciding whether to expose his family to a presidential campaign. His wife, Gert, said she was "initially ... not delighted about it", but later changed her mind after hearing their son Wesley Clark Jr. say that "things have to change, and we're willing to do it. And I want my son to grow up in a different world." Clark went on Meet the Press in June 2003 and said he was "seriously consider[ing]" running for president. Clark believes Bill Clinton encouraged him to run when he attended a party hosted by the Clintons, and Clinton toasted his wife Hillary and Clark as the two "stars" of the Democratic Party. Clark's repeated connections with Bill Clinton led pundits to speculate that Clark was being maneuvered by the Clintons to change the Democratic field and clear a path for Hillary to enter the race. This theory lasted only a few months, and Antonia Felix speculated in her biography of Clark that it came from the largely unexplained connection between Clark and Bill Clinton that led to speculation.

== Announcement ==
Clark announced his candidacy for the Democratic presidential primary elections from Little Rock on September 17, 2003, months after the other candidates. He acknowledged the influence of the Draft Clark movement, saying they "took an inconceivable idea and made it conceivable". Clark's early campaign staff took on many figures prominent in the 1992 and 1996 Clinton-Gore campaigns, including Mickey Kantor. He also hired one of the founders of DraftWesleyClark.com, John Hlinko, to be his director of Internet strategy. The campaign raised $3.5 million in the first two weeks. The internet campaign would also establish the Clark Community Network of blogs, which is still used today and made heavy use of Meetup.com, where DraftWesleyClark.com had established the second-largest community of Meetups at the time.

== Campaign platform ==
Clark, coming from a non-political background, had no position papers to define his agenda for the public. Once in the campaign, however, several volunteers established a network of connections with the media, and Clark began to explain his stances on a variety of issues.

Clark told The Washington Post in October that he was pro-choice and pro-affirmative action. He called for a repeal of recent Bush tax cuts for people earning more than $200,000 and suggested providing healthcare for the uninsured by altering the current system rather than transferring to a completely new universal health care system. He backed environmental causes such as promising to reverse "scaled down rules" the Bush administration had applied to the Clean Air and Clean Water Acts and dealing with global warming by reducing greenhouse gas emissions.

Clark also proposed a global effort to strengthen American relations with other nations, reviewing the PATRIOT Act, and investing $100 billion in homeland security. Finally, he put out a budget plan that claimed to save $2.35 trillion over ten years through a repeal of the Bush tax cuts, sharing the cost of the Iraq War with other nations, and cutting government waste.

Clark had testified before the House Committee on Armed Services on September 26, 2002 that while he supported the Iraq Resolution he believed the country should try other options before the more immediate war President Bush had been calling for at the time, and this testimony was later used during his presidential campaign to portray Clark as pro-war although FactCheck called this a "classic case of ripping quotes out of their full context in order to create a false picture."

Clark testified before this committee again in 2005, a hearing Dana Milbank of The Washington Post characterized as having a "different tune" as some of Clark's 2002 testimony that had been portrayed by some committee members as "fuzzy stuff" and "dumb clichés" had proven itself true in the ensuing two and a half years.

== Campaign developments ==
Clark's loyalty to the Democratic Party was questioned by some as soon as he entered the race. Senator Joe Lieberman called Clark's party choice a matter of "political convenience, not conviction". Republican governor Bill Owens of Colorado and University of Denver president Marc Holtzman have claimed Clark once said "I would have been a Republican if Karl Rove had returned my phone calls." Clark later claimed he was simply joking, but both Owens and Holtzman said the remark was delivered "very directly" and "wasn't a joke". Katharine Q. Seelye wrote that many believed Clark had only chosen to be a Democrat in 2004 because it was "the only party that did not have a nominee". On May 11, 2001, Clark also delivered a speech to the Pulaski County Republican Party in Arkansas saying he was "very glad we've got the great team in office, men like Colin Powell, Don Rumsfeld, Dick Cheney, Condoleezza Rice, Paul O'Neill – people I know very well – our president George W. Bush". U.S. News & World Report ran a story two weeks later claiming Clark might be considered some form of political run as a Republican.

Some, such as Clark's biography writer Antonia Felix, have speculated that Clark's inexperience at giving "soundbite" answers hurt him in the media during his primary campaign. The day after he launched his campaign, for example, he was asked if he would have voted for the Iraq War Resolution, which granted President Bush the power to wage the Iraq War, a large issue in the 2004 campaign. Clark said, "At the time, I probably would have voted for it, but I think that's too simple a question," then "I don't know if I would have or not. I've said it both ways because when you get into this, what happens is you have to put yourself in a position – on balance, I probably would have voted for it." Finally, Clark's press secretary clarified his position as "you said you would have voted for the resolution as leverage for a UN-based solution." After this series of responses, although Clark opposed the war, The New York Times ran a story with the headline "Clark Says He Would Have Voted for War". Clark was repeatedly portrayed as unsure on this critical issue by his opponents throughout the primary season, being forced to continue to clarify his position such as at the second primary debate when he said, "I think it's really embarrassing that a group of candidates up here are working on changing the leadership in this country and can't get their own story straight ... I would have never voted for war. The war was an unnecessary war, it was an elective war, and it's been a huge strategic mistake for this country."

Another media incident started during the New Hampshire primary September 27, 2003, when Clark was asked by Space Shuttle astronaut Jay C. Buckey what his vision for the space program was after the Space Shuttle Columbia disaster. Clark responded he was a great believer in the exploration of space but wanted a vision well beyond that of a new shuttle or space plane. "I would like to see mankind get off this planet. I'd like to know what's out there beyond the solar system." Clark thought such a vision could probably require a lifetime of research and development in various fields of science and technology. Then at the end of his remarks, Clark dropped a bombshell when he said "I still believe in E = mc². But I can't believe that in all of human history we'll never ever be able to go beyond the speed of light to reach where we want to go. I happen to believe that mankind can do it. I've argued with physicists about it. I've argued with best friends about it. I just have to believe it. It's my only faith-based initiative." This led to a series of headlines deriding the response, such as "Beam Us Up, General Clark" in The New York Times, "Clark is Light-Years Ahead of the Competition" in The Washington Post, "General Relativity (Retired)" on the U.S. News & World Report website, and "Clark Campaigns at Light Speed" in Wired magazine.

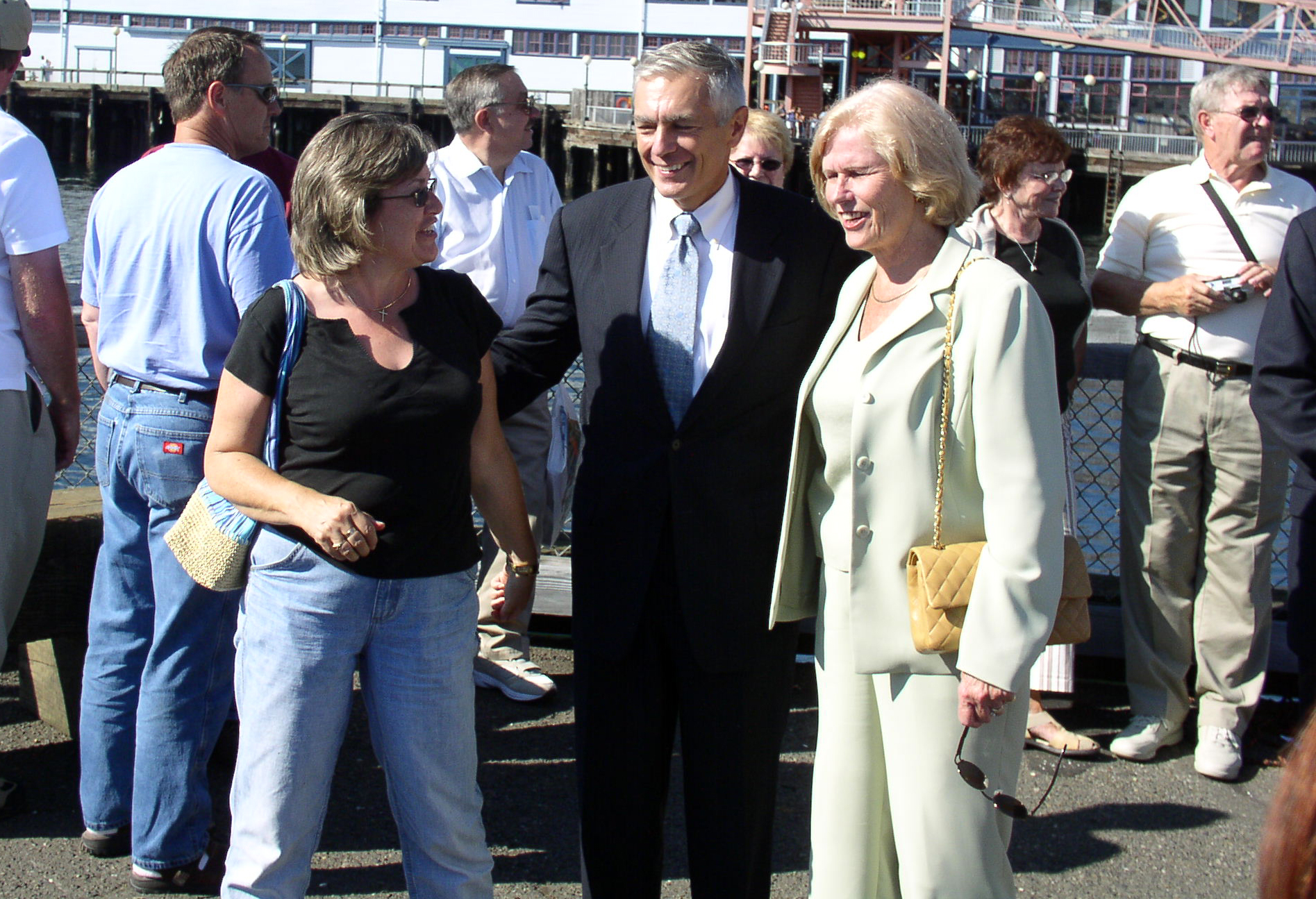
Clark (center) with his wife Gertrude (right) in Seattle, Washington on August 19, 2004

Several polls from September to November 2003 showed Clark leading the Democratic field of candidates or as a close second to Howard Dean. The John Edwards campaign brought on Hugh Shelton – the general who had said Clark was made to leave the SACEUR post early due to "integrity and character issues" – as an advisor, a move that drew criticism from the Clark campaign. Since Dean consistently polled in the lead in the Iowa caucuses, Clark opted out of participating in the caucuses entirely to focus on later primaries instead. The 2004 Iowa caucuses marked a turning point in the campaign for the Democratic nomination, however, as front-runners Dean and Dick Gephardt garnered results far lower than expected, and John Kerry and John Edwards campaigns' benefited in Clark's absence.

== Withdrawal ==
Although Clark performed reasonably well in later primaries, such as a tie for third place with Edwards in the New Hampshire primary and narrowly winning the Oklahoma primary over Edwards, he saw his third-place finish in Tennessee and distant third in Virginia as signs that he had lost the South, which his campaign had been centered on. He withdrew from the race on February 11, 2004, and announced his endorsement of John Kerry at a rally in Madison, Wisconsin on February 13. Clark believed his opting out of the Iowa caucus was one of his campaign's biggest mistakes, saying to one supporter the day before he withdrew from the race that "everything would have been different if we had [been in Iowa]."

== Key results ==
Primary Contest	Place	Percentage
Iowa	7th	0%
New Hampshire	3rd	13%
Arizona	2nd	27%
Delaware	5th	10%
Missouri	4th	4%
New Mexico	2nd	21%
North Dakota	2nd	24%
Oklahoma	1st	30%
South Carolina	4th	7%
Michigan	5th	7%
Washington	5th	3%
Maine	5th	4%
Tennessee	3rd	23%
Virginia	3rd	9%

Clark won the contest (Oklahoma)
Clark placed 2nd or 3rd in the contest (Virginia, Tennessee, North Dakota, New Mexico, Arizona, New Hampshire)
Clark placed below third in the contest (Maine, Washington, Michigan, South Carolina, Missouri, Delaware, Iowa)

== Notable endorsements ==
=== U.S. senators ===
- Senator Max Baucus of Montana
- Senator Ernest Hollings of South Carolina
- Senator Blanche Lincoln of Arkansas
- Senator Mark Pryor of Arkansas
- Former senator and 1972 presidential nominee George McGovern of South Dakota
- Former senator Gaylord Nelson of Wisconsin
- Former senator David Pryor of Arkansas
- Former senator Dale Bumpers of Arkansas

=== U.S. representatives ===
- Representative Artur Davis of Alabama
- Representative Marion Berry of Arkansas
- Representative Vic Snyder of Arkansas
- Representative Mike Ross of Arkansas
- Representative Mike Thompson of California
- Representative Sanford Bishop of Georgia
- Representative Rahm Emanuel of Illinois
- Representative Bill Jefferson of Louisiana
- Representative Betty McCollum of Minnesota
- Representative Gene Taylor of Mississippi
- Representative Steve Israel of New York
- Representative Charles Rangel of New York
- Representative Anthony Weiner of New York
- Representative Lincoln Davis of Tennessee
- Representative Martin Frost of Texas
- Representative Solomon Ortiz of Texas
- Representative Charlie Stenholm of Texas
- Representative Jim Matheson of Utah

=== Governors ===
- Former governor Joe Frank Harris of Georgia
- Former governor Jim Hodges of South Carolina
- Former governor Don Siegelman of Alabama
- Former governor Jim Florio of New Jersey

=== Former Executive Branch officials ===
- Former U.S. secretary of the treasury Robert Rubin
- Former U.S. secretary of commerce Mickey Kantor
- Former U.S. ambassador to the United Nations Andrew Young
- Former U.S. secretary of the navy John Dalton

=== Other officeholders ===
- Former New York City mayor David Dinkins
- Former New York City mayor Ed Koch
- Wisconsin lieutenant governor Barbara Lawton
- Former Arizona superintendent of public instruction Carolyn Warner
- Virginia state senator Creigh Deeds

=== Celebrities ===
- Filmmaker Michael Moore
- Singer Madonna
