= Jon Keyser =

American politician

Member of the Colorado House of Representatives from the 25th district
- In office January 7, 2014 – January 25, 2016
- Preceded by: Cheri Gerou
- Succeeded by: Timothy Leonard

Personal details
- Born: September 7, 1981 (age 45) Salida, Colorado
- Party: Republican
- Spouse: Emma Keyser
- Education: United States Air Force Academy (B.S.); University of Denver (J.D.)

Military service
- Allegiance: United States
- Branch/service: United States Air Force
- Years of service: 2004–present
- Rank: Major
- Unit: 566th Intelligence Squadron
- Battles/wars: Iraq War; Afghanistan War
- Awards: Bronze Star Medal

Jonathan Michael Keyser is an attorney and former state representative who served in the Colorado House of Representatives. He represented House District 25, which encompasses western Jefferson County, Colorado including Morrison, Conifer, Evergreen, Pine, and parts of Littleton, Golden, and Ken Caryl. He was elected in November, 2014 as a Republican.

== Military service ==
Born at Heart of the Rockies Regional Medical Center, Keyser, a graduate of the United States Air Force Academy and recipient of the Bronze Star Medal, served on active duty in the United States Air Force as an intelligence officer. He served tours in both Iraq and Afghanistan. Keyser was also a member of the U.S. Air Force Academy's parachuting demonstration team, the Wings of Blue. During his deployment to Iraq, he served as National Security Agency and Central Security Service Foreign Affairs Directorate liaison officer at the U.S. Embassy in support of Operation Iraqi Freedom and participated in 31 direct action and counter-terrorism missions, resulting in the capture or elimination of 107 high-value enemy individuals. Keyser currently serves in the U.S. Air Force Reserve.

== Legislative career ==
Keyser's 2014 nomination as Republican candidate for House District 25 of the Colorado House of Representatives was uncontested at the district caucus. He ran against Democratic nominee Janet Doyle and Libertarian candidate Jack Woehr. The election was the first in Colorado to be completely done with mail-in ballots. Keyser won with 52.2% of the vote compared to 43% for Doyle and 4% for Woehr.

== 2016 U.S. Senate election ==
In December 2015, it was reported that he was considering running for the United States Senate seat currently held by Michael Bennet. On January 11, 2016, Keyser announced his candidacy for the Republican nomination in the 2016 Senate race. On April 25, 2016, Colorado Secretary of State Wayne W. Williams announced that Keyser failed to qualify for the Republican Senate primary following a review of ballot petition signatures. Keyser successfully appealed Williams' decision and was added to the ballot on April 29, 2016.
