= Tony Grampsas =

American politician

Member of the Colorado Senate from the 13th district
- In office January 13, 1999 – February 8, 1999
- Preceded by: Sally Hopper
- Succeeded by: Bryan Sullivant

Member of the Colorado House of Representatives from the 25th district
- In office January 9, 1985 – January 13, 1999
- Preceded by: Frank Defilippo
- Succeeded by: John Witwer

Personal details
- Born: October 4, 1936 Kansas City, Missouri
- Died: February 8, 1999 (aged 62) Evergreen, Colorado
- Party: Republican

Tony Grampsas (October 4, 1936 – February 8, 1999) was an American politician who served in the Colorado House of Representatives from the 25th district from 1985 to 1999 and in the Colorado Senate from the 13th district from January 1999 until his death in February 1999.

He died of cancer on February 8, 1999, in Evergreen, Colorado at age 62.
