= Cheri Gerou =

American architect and politician

Member of the Colorado House of Representatives from the 25th district
- In office 2009–2014
- Preceded by: Rob Witwer
- Succeeded by: Jon Keyser

Personal details
- Born: February 3, 1956 (age 70) Casper, Wyoming, U.S.
- Party: Republican
- Spouse: Phil Gerou
- Education: University of Colorado, Boulder

Cheri Rodgers Gerou (born February 3, 1956, in Casper, Wyoming) is an American architect and former politician, who served as a Republican in the General Assembly of the U.S. state of Colorado. First elected to the Colorado House of Representatives as a Republican in 2008, Gerou represented House District 25, which encompasses western Jefferson County, Colorado. She currently serves as the Director of Capital Assets at the University of Colorado.

== Biography ==
Born and raised in Wyoming, Gerou moved to Colorado in 1975. She earned a bachelor's degree in fine arts from the University of Colorado at Boulder and settled in Evergreen, Colorado, in the late 1980s.

Gerou and her husband, Phillip H. Gerou, who, like her, is a Fellow of the American Institute of Architects, have two children, Greg and Sara, and are the co-founders of Gerou & Associates, an Evergreen architectural firm specializing in residential, small commercial, and historic preservation work.

An active member of the American Institute of Architects (AIA), Gerou has served as co-chair of the 1998 Denver Design Awards, president of the Denver AIA chapter in 2002, and president of the Colorado AIA chapter in 2006, and chair of the Constructors and Designers Alliance in 2008. She was named to the State Licensing Board of Architects, Professional Engineers and Professional Land Surveyors by Gov. Bill Owens in 2006, and has served as the board's secretary as vice chair of the Survey Quorum of Professional Land Surveyors. She is also a member of the National Council of Architectural Registration Boards, the American Society of Interior Designers, The National Trust for Historic Preservation, and the Colorado Historical Society.

In the local community, she has served as chair of the Board of Deacons for Rockland Community Church, as a board member of The Kempe Center, and as a chair of the Community Caring Project.

== Legislative career ==
=== 2008 election ===
Gerou faced no opposition in the Republican primary in August, but faced Democrat Andrew Scripter and Libertarian Jack Woehr in the November 2008 general election. Gerou's candidacy was endorsed by the Golden Transcript and the Denver Post. Gerou won the traditionally Republican seat previously held by Rep. Rob Witwer, who had opted not to run for another term, taking 53 percent of the votes cast, winning by ten percentage points.

=== 2009 legislative session ===
For the 2009 legislative session, Gerou was named to seats on the House Finance Committee and the House Health and Human Services Committee.

=== 2010 election ===
In 2010, Gerou was re-elected to the Colorado Assembly with no opponent on the ballot.

=== 2012 election ===
In the 2012 General Election, Representative Gerou faced Democratic challenger Lorna Idol and Libertarian Jack Woehr. Gerou was reelected by a margin of 55% to 40% to 5%.

=== 2014 election ===
In 2014, Gerou did not run for reelection. She was succeeded by Republican attorney and veteran Jon Keyser.
