= Timothy Leonard (Colorado politician) =

American politician

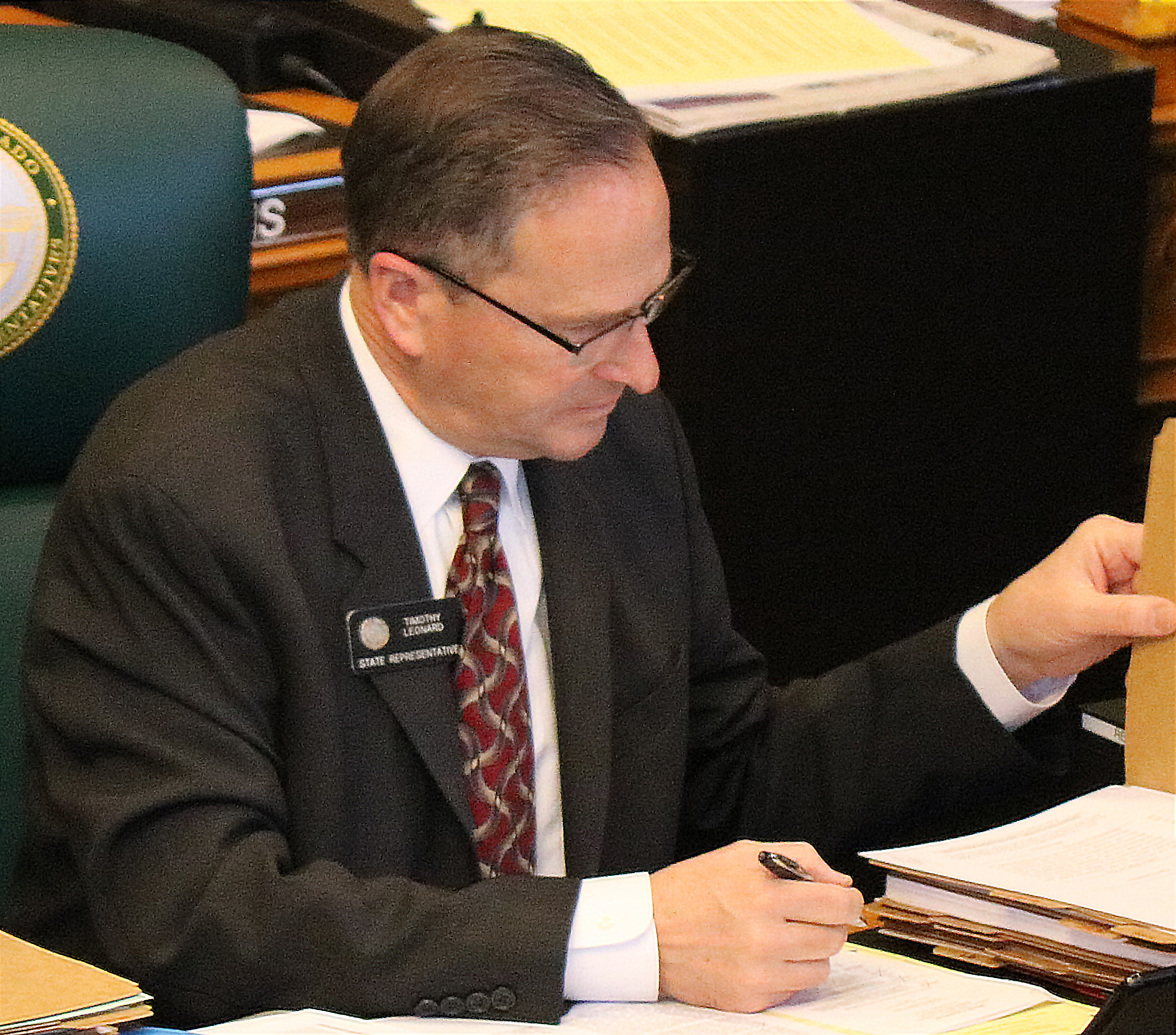
- Leonard in 2018.

Member of the Colorado House of Representatives from the 25th district
- In office January 26, 2016 – January 4, 2019
- Preceded by: Jon Keyser
- Succeeded by: Lisa Cutter

Personal details
- Party: Republican
- Education: Hillsdale College; University of Denver
- Profession: Commercial real estate business owner
- Website: timleonardforcolorado.com

Timothy Leonard is a former state representative from Evergreen, Colorado. A Republican, Leonard represented Colorado House of Representatives District 25, which encompasses much of western Jefferson County, including the communities of Aspen Park, Dakota Ridge, Evergreen, Fairmount, Genesee, Idledale, Indian Hills, Kittredge, and Morrison.

== Elections ==
On January 23, 2016, a vacancy committee appointed Leonard to the office to fill the open seat created after his predecessor resigned. He was sworn in on January 26, 2016. Running for office that same year, Leonard beat his Democratic opponent, winning 51.83% of the vote in the general election.

== Legal troubles ==
In December 2016, Leonard served two weeks in jail for contempt of court. A judge handed down the sentence after finding he violated the terms of his 2013 divorce. The case centered on a dispute between Leonard and his ex-wife regarding who could make certain decisions regarding the education of several of the couple's six children.
