= Rob Witwer =

American politician

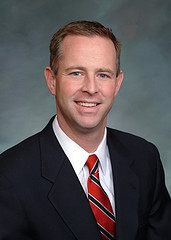
- Witwer in 2008

Member of the Colorado House of Representatives from the 25th district
- In office January 2005 – January 2009
- Preceded by: John Witwer
- Succeeded by: Cheri Gerou

Personal details
- Born: February 2, 1971 (age 55)
- Party: Republican
- Spouse: Heather Witwer
- Education: Amherst College; University of Chicago

Rob Witwer (born February 2, 1971) is a Colorado politician, lawyer, and former Republican member of the Colorado House of Representatives. In the State House, Witwer represented House District 25, which encompasses most of western Jefferson County, Colorado including Evergreen, Colorado and Conifer, Colorado.

Witwer was appointed to the Colorado General Assembly in 2005 by vacancy committee and won the general election in 2006 by defeating Democrat Mike Daniels with 56.6% of the popular vote.

Witwer sponsored legislation to improve public access to hiking trails by extending legal liability protection to landowners who allow public access to their land. Along with State Senator Josh Penry, he has pushed for legislation to raise graduation standards for Colorado high school students, especially in the areas of math and science. He has also been outspoken against legislative efforts to freeze mill levies on Colorado property owners, arguing that this policy amounts to a property tax increase.

The Rocky Mountain News has called Witwer, Josh Penry, Cory Gardner and Matt Knoedler the "Rock Stars" of the Colorado GOP, and National Journal named him one of its "stars to watch in the future".

Witwer announced that he would not seek re-election in 2008. Witwer served as Campaign Manager for his successor, Representative Cheri Gerou. Witwer says he is likely to return to public service after he has more time to spare from raising his four young sons.

Witwer is a graduate of Amherst College (1993) and the University of Chicago Law School (1996).
