= Bob Beauprez =

American politician (born 1948)

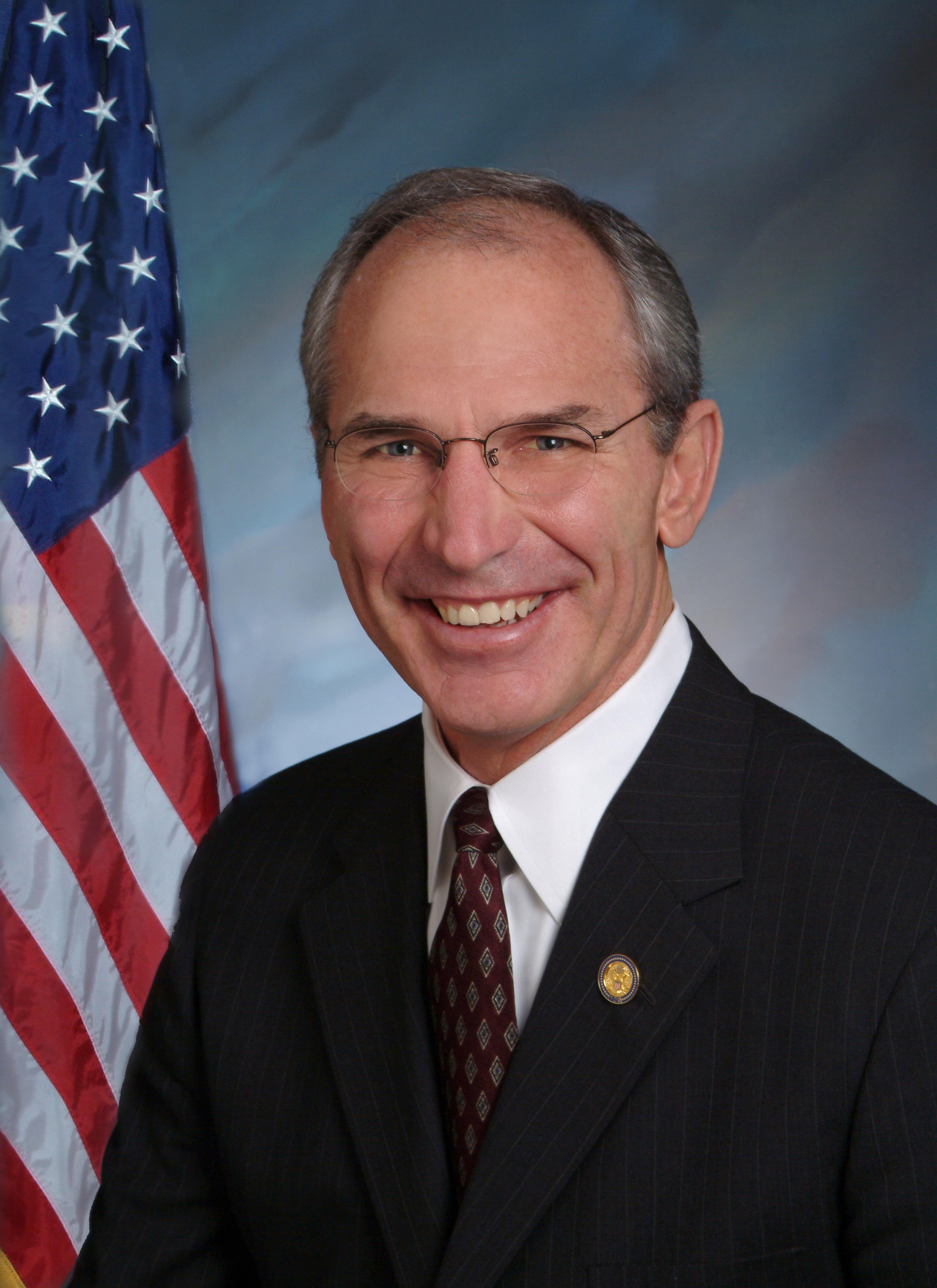

Member of the U.S. House of Representatives from Colorado's 7th district
- In office January 3, 2003 – January 3, 2007
- Preceded by: Constituency established
- Succeeded by: Ed Perlmutter

Personal details
- Born: Robert Louis Beauprez; September 22, 1948 (age 77) Lafayette, Colorado, U.S.
- Party: Republican (1970s–present)
- Other political affiliations: Democratic (before 1970s)
- Spouse: Claudia Paul
- Children: 4
- Education: University of Colorado, Boulder (BS)

Robert Louis Beauprez (/boʊpreɪ/; born September 22, 1948) is an American politician and member of the Republican Party from the state of Colorado.

Beauprez is a Colorado native and graduate of the University of Colorado Boulder. He worked as a dairy farmer and community banker before serving as chair of the Colorado Republican Party from 1999 to 2002. He was then elected to represent Colorado's 7th congressional district in the United States House of Representatives, where he served from 2003 to 2007. He gave up his seat to run for governor of Colorado in 2006 but lost to Democratic nominee Bill Ritter. He was the Republican nominee for governor again in the 2014 election, losing to incumbent Democratic Governor John Hickenlooper. Beauprez is a member of the ReFormers Caucus of Issue One.

== Early life ==
Beauprez was born in Lafayette, Colorado. He grew up on his family's dairy farm, which had been purchased by his grandparents, outside of Boulder, Colorado. He is the son of Marie (née Stengel) and Joseph C. Beauprez. His paternal grandparents had emigrated from Belgium to Colorado and raised draft horses on the family's land. His mother's family was of German descent. His parents raised both Hereford and dairy cattle on the farm. Beauprez often cites his father's example as a major influence on his life. Like his father and the majority of blue collar Catholics in the area he originally registered as a Democrat before switching parties in the 1970s. He attributes this to his frustration with prominent Colorado Democrats at that time.

Beauprez attended Fairview High School where he played football and was named all-conference offensive tackle. He went on to study physical education at the University of Colorado, and received his B.S. in 1970.

== Republican Party chairmanship ==
While Beauprez had been involved in the Republican Party for some time, his first leadership role came in 1997 as the chairman of the Boulder County Republican Party.

In 1999, with the backing of Senator Wayne Allard, Beauprez became chairman of the Colorado Republican Party. His tenure as state party chairman was marked by an aggressive attempts to use redistricting to get more Republican candidates elected in Colorado. The Republican Party lost control of the Colorado State Senate for the first time in four decades while Beauprez was chairman.

== U.S. House of Representatives ==
In 2002, Beauprez ran to represent Colorado's 7th congressional district in the U.S. House of Representatives, regarded as a "swing" district. In beating Democrat Mike Feeley by only 121 votes he won the closest race in the nation. As a freshman, Beauprez served on the House Transportation and Infrastructure Committee, the Veterans Affairs Committee, and the Small Business Committee. He was re-elected in 2004 and subsequently obtained a position on the powerful House Ways and Means Committee.

== 2006 Colorado gubernatorial election ==
Beauprez won the Republican Party nomination for governor in August 2006, running to succeed two-term governor Bill Owens, who was ineligible for a third consecutive term. Beauprez ended up winning the nomination uncontested; he was briefly opposed by Marc Holtzman, who dropped out of the race and endorsed Beauprez several months before the primary.

=== Military service controversy ===
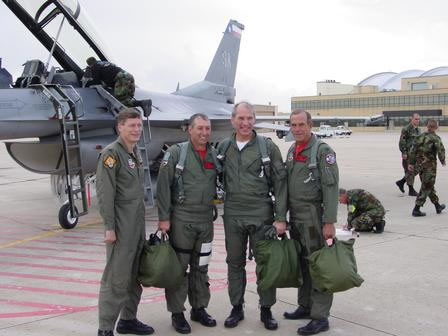
Bob Beauprez, third from left, following a flight in an F-16 over Colorado.

On February 2, 2006, veterans called on Beauprez to apologize for appearing at a photo-op in a military-issued uniform, even though he had never served in the military. He had requested and received three draft deferments and then a medical release during the Vietnam War. In May 2006, ProgressNow, a liberal advocacy group, produced an Internet-based ad that again focused on Beauprez's draft status during Vietnam. The Beauprez campaign dismissed the ad as done by a "well-financed attack machine."

=== NCIC database ===
In October, Beauprez started running ads that attacked Ritter's performance as Denver district attorney, citing a plea-bargained case against illegal immigrant and alleged heroin dealer Carlos Estrada Medina. Under the plea bargain, the dealer was given probation. Later, he was arrested in California, under an alias, on suspicion of sexual abuse on a child. But the fact that that information couldn't be verified in public court records prompted inquiries to Beauprez's campaign as to where it got its facts. Beauprez's campaign manager, John Marshall told a local news station, "In federal criminal databases, the guy's information matches up." That comment set off alarms in Ritter's campaign because federal criminal databases are off-limits to anyone but law enforcement and can be used only for law enforcement purposes.

As the subsequent arrest was under an alias, Ritter's supporters argued that the information could only have been obtained by accessing the National Crime Information Center (NCIC) database, which access is restricted by federal law. The Colorado Bureau of Investigation initiated an investigation, and found enough evidence to then ask FBI to join its probe.

Beauprez denied anything improper had occurred, and that he had never heard of the NCIC database. The Denver Post noted that, as a Congressman, Beauprez had cosponsored a bill relating to the database. When charges were brought against the ICE agent who provided the information to John Marshall, he was acquitted in a jury trial.

=== Criticism and praise regarding Cory Voorhis ===
Bureau of Immigration and Customs Enforcement Senior Special Agent Cory Voorhis was prosecuted for retrieving Medina's rap sheet from the NCIC database and sharing it with Beauprez' staff. Beauprez defended the action as "whistleblowing," citing a pattern of lenient plea bargains during Ritter's term as district attorney. Many questioned why a Denver District Attorney employee, who accessed the same information and shared it with the Ritter campaign, was not also prosecuted. Voorhis was found not guilty on April 9, 2008. One of the jurors in the case said the jury didn't think Voorhis had "done anything intentionally wrong" and there were "some feelings" that Voorhis had been unfairly "singled out" for prosecution.

During the investigation, Beauprez received criticism for appearing to be unsupportive of Voorhis. But following Voorhis' acquittal, it became public that Beauprez did offer assistance to Voorhis, which was turned down by Voorhis' attorneys in order to avoid the appearance of a partisan political relationship. In an open letter to Beauprez, Voorhis wrote "You are indeed an honorable gentleman, and a great American." At least one media figure, Peter Boyles, apologized to Beauprez and retracted his criticism.

=== Results ===
On November 7, Beauprez lost the gubernatorial election to Democratic former Denver District Attorney Bill Ritter by 262,100 votes.

== 2014 Colorado gubernatorial election ==
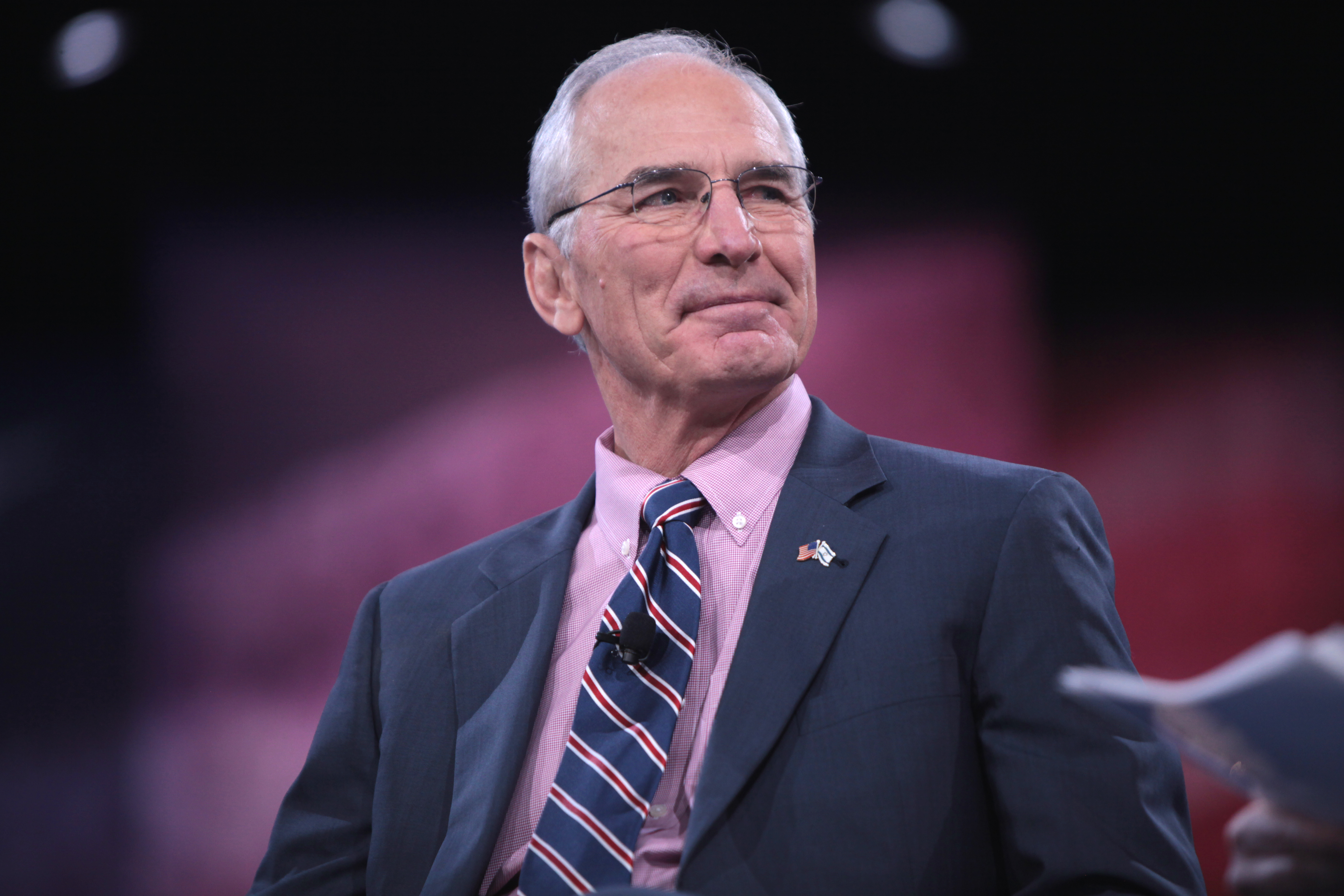
Beauprez speaking at the Conservative Political Action Conference in Washington, D.C.

In March 2014, Beauprez announced that he would seek the Republican nomination for governor to challenge incumbent Democratic Governor John Hickenlooper. Beauprez did not contest the Republican state assembly on April 12, instead petitioning his way onto the ballot.

The primary election was held on June 24 and Beauprez triumphed with a plurality, taking 116,333 votes (30.24%) to Tom Tancredo's 102,830 (26.73%), Scott Gessler's 89,213 (23.19%) and Mike Kopp's 76,373 (19.85%).

On 1 July, Beauprez announced Douglas County Commissioner Jill Repella as his running mate.

On July 3, video footage surfaced of Beauprez speaking in 2010, where he made remarks similar to those made by Mitt Romney in 2012. Speaking to the Denver Rotary Club, said Beauprez:

47% of all Americans pay no federal income tax. I'm guessing that most of you in this room are not in that 47% -- God bless you -- but what that tells me is that we've got almost half the population perfectly happy that somebody else is paying the bill, and most of that half is you all. I submit to you that there is a political strategy [by Democrats] to get slightly over half [of the vote] and have a permanent ruling political majority by keeping over half of the population dependent on the largesse of government that somebody else is paying for.

Democrats responded that Beauprez, who was in the middle of a "Unity Tour" with his running mate and former primary opponents, had a "funny way" of showing unity with Coloradans and called him "out of touch" and "elitist" for "[accusing] half of the population of being freeloaders." Beauprez's campaign stood behind the comments and said that "in full context, [he's] saying that it's sad more people are not doing well enough to pay federal income tax."

In August, Beauprez said that he would send Colorado Army National Guard troops to the Mexico border: "If Rick Perry or another governor requested it, I would certainly step up and do my part." Beauprez was criticised as doing so would be against the law. He later clarified his comments, saying that he meant he would send them on a humanitarian effort, not a military one.

On November 4, 2014, Hickenlooper defeated Beauprez by 68,238 votes; on November 5, Beauprez officially conceded to Hickenlooper.

== 2016 election activity ==
In the 2015-2016 election cycle, Beauprez founded Colorado Pioneer Action, which sponsored a number of communications (including websites and mailers) promoting and supporting certain candidates for (primarily state legislative) office and opposing others. In late June 2016, a watchdog organization (Campaign Integrity Watchdog) filed a campaign finance complaint alleging that Beauprez's Colorado Pioneer Action organization was in reality an unregistered political committee operating in violation of Colorado campaign finance disclosure laws. After nearly a year of pre-trial motions, including multiple attempts by Beauprez to have the complaint dismissed, the case went to trial at the end of March 2017.

Colorado Pioneer Action was found to have committed multiple violations of Colorado campaign finance law, fined $17,735 and ordered to register and disclose its contributors. Beauprez and Colorado Pioneer Action appealed the ruling to the Colorado Court of Appeals, where a decision is pending.

== Treasurer for the American Conservative Union ==
Beauprez served as the treasurer for the American Conservative Union, the organization that hosts the annual Conservative Political Action Conference. He abruptly resigned his position on May 25, 2023, citing lack of transparency in the compensation given to the organization's president Matt Schlapp.

== Personal life ==
Beauprez is married and has four children and six grandchildren.

U.S. House of Representatives
New constituency	Member of the U.S. House of Representatives from Colorado's 7th congressional district 2003–2007	Succeeded by Ed Perlmutter
Party political offices
Preceded by Bill Owens	Republican nominee for Governor of Colorado; 2006	Succeeded by Dan Maes
Preceded by Dan Maes	Republican nominee for Governor of Colorado; 2014	Succeeded by Walker Stapleton
U.S. order of precedence (ceremonial)
Preceded by Jon L. Christensen as Former U.S. Representative	Order of precedence of the United States as Former U.S. Representative	Succeeded by Rick Hill as Former U.S. Representative
