= John Witwer =

American politician

Member of the Colorado House of Representatives from the 25th district
- In office January 13, 1999 – June 1, 2005
- Preceded by: Tony Grampsas
- Succeeded by: Rob Witwer

Personal details
- Born: December 3, 1940 (age 85) Pittsburgh, Pennsylvania
- Party: Republican

John Witwer (born December 3, 1940) is an American politician who served in the Colorado House of Representatives from the 25th district from 1999 to 2005.
