= Bryan Sullivant =

American politician

Member of the Colorado Senate from the 13th district
- In office February 1999 – January 10, 2001
- Preceded by: Tony Grampsas
- Succeeded by: Joan Fitz-Gerald

Member of the Colorado House of Representatives from the 62nd district
- In office January 11, 1995 – February 1999
- Preceded by: Sam Williams
- Succeeded by: Glenn Scott

Personal details
- Born: June 13, 1955 Rochester, Minnesota
- Died: September 9, 2006 (aged 51) Dillon Reservoir, Colorado
- Party: Republican

Bryan Sullivant (June 13, 1955 – September 9, 2006) was an American politician who served in the Colorado House of Representatives from the 62nd district from 1995 to 1999 and in the Colorado Senate from the 13th district from 1999 to 2001.

He died of an apparent drowning on September 9, 2006, in Dillon Reservoir at age 51.
