= 1918 United States Senate election in Colorado =

- November 5, 1918
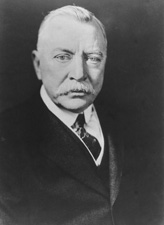

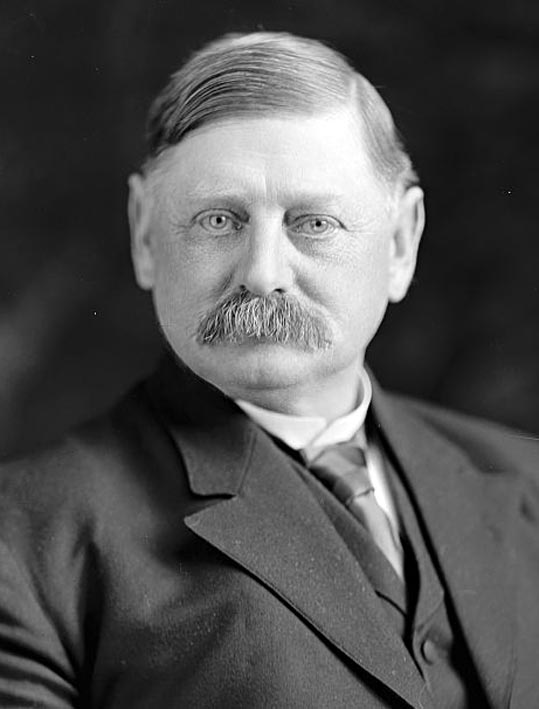
Nominee	Lawrence C. Phipps	John F. Shafroth
Party	Republican	Democratic
Popular vote	107,726	104,347
Percentage	49.49%	47.94%
- County results Phipps: 40–50% 50–60% Shafroth: 40–50% 50–60% 60–70% 70–80%
U.S. senator before election
John F. Shafroth
Democratic
Elected U.S. Senator
Lawrence C. Phipps
Republican

The 1918 United States Senate election in Colorado took place on November 5, 1918. It was the second direct U.S. Senate election in Colorado following the ratification of the Seventeenth Amendment, and the first for the Class 2 Senate seat. Democratic senator John F. Shafroth ran for re-election to a second term, and was opposed by Denver businessman Lawrence C. Phipps, the Republican nominee, in the general election. As Republicans made gains nationwide, they performed well in Colorado, too, and Phipps unseated Shafroth by a thin margin.

== Democratic primary ==
=== Candidates ===
==== Declared ====
- John F. Shafroth, incumbent U.S. senator

=== Results ===
Democratic primary results
Party	Candidate	Votes	%
Democratic	John F. Shafroth (inc.)	42,664	100.00
Total votes		42,664	100.00

== Republican primary ==
=== Candidates ===
- Lawrence C. Phipps, Denver businessman, President of the Colorado Taxpayers Protective League
- Charles W. Waterman, Denver attorney

=== Results ===
Republican primary results
Party	Candidate	Votes	%
Republican	Lawrence C. Phipps	31,537	67.43
Republican	Charles W. Waterman	15,235	32.57
Total votes		46,772	100.00

== General election ==
=== Results ===
1918 United States Senate election in Colorado
Party	Candidate	Votes	%
Republican	Lawrence C. Phipps	107,726	49.49%
Democratic	John F. Shafroth (inc.)	104,347	47.94%
Prohibition	P. A. Richardson	5,606	2.58%
Total votes		217,679	100.00%
Republican gain from Democratic			
