= Rockland Community Church and Cemetery =

Historic site in Jefferson County, Colorado, US

- U.S. National Register of Historic Places
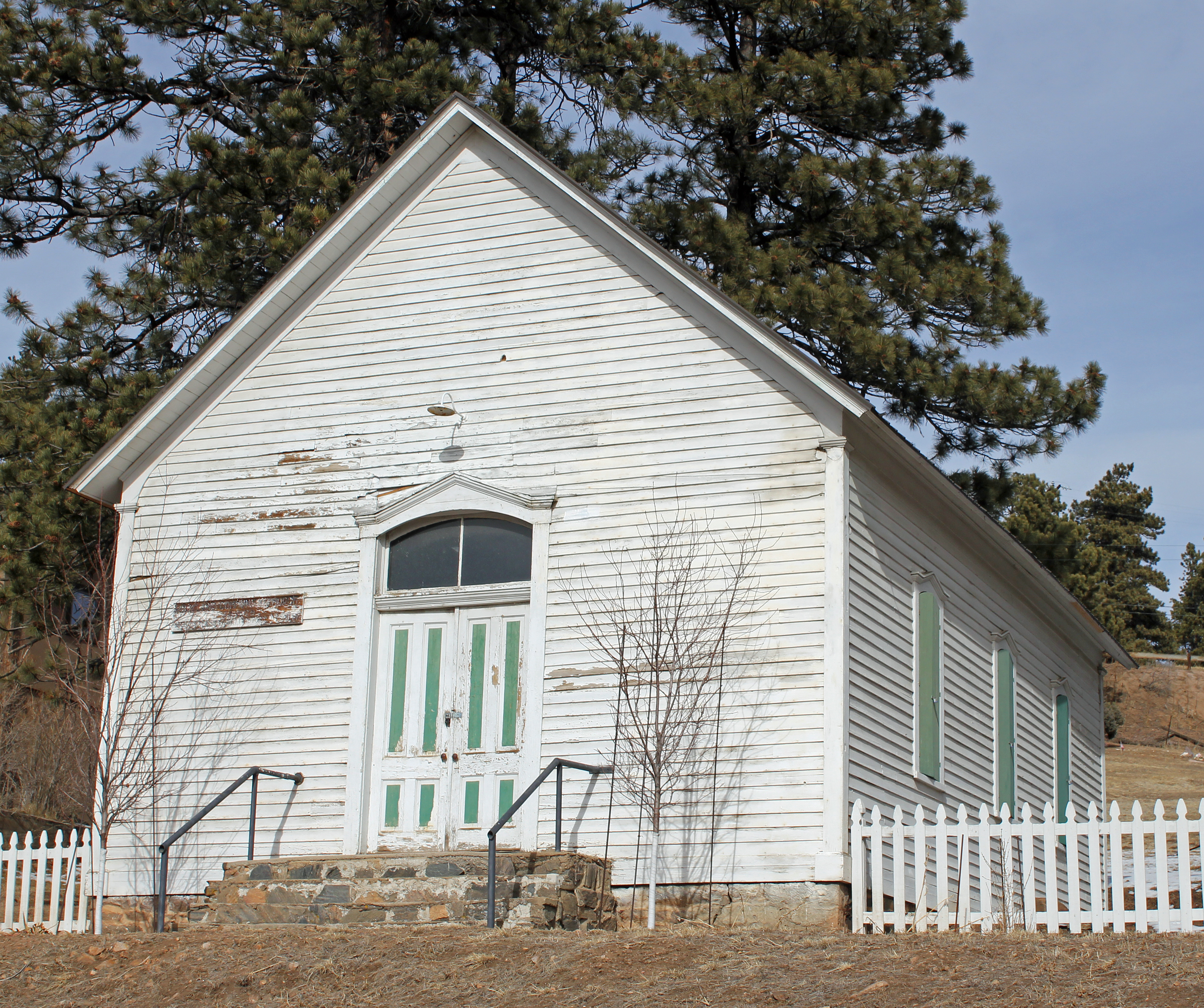
- The church in early 2013.

- Location within Colorado Location within the United States
- Location: 24225 Rockland Rd., Golden, Colorado
- Coordinates: 39°42′35″N 105°16′20″W
- Area: 1 acre (0.40 ha)
- Built: 1880
- Built by: D.M. Turner
- Architectural style: Late Victorian
- NRHP reference No.: 09000584
- Added to NRHP: August 5, 2009

Rockland Community Church and Cemetery (also known as Old Rockland Church; Rockland Memorial Community Church; United Brethren Church; Mt. Zion Church) is a historic church building at 24225 Rockland Road in Golden, Colorado.

It was built in 1879, dedicated on January 10, 1880, and was added to the National Register of Historic Places in 2009.

It was built by a Mr. Turner of Golden, Colorado.
