= Marc Holtzman =

American businessman

Marc Holtzman is an American banker and former politician who is the chairman of the Bank of Kigali, Rwanda's largest financial institution. Additionally, is chairman of CBZ Holdings, the largest financial institution in Zimbabwe.

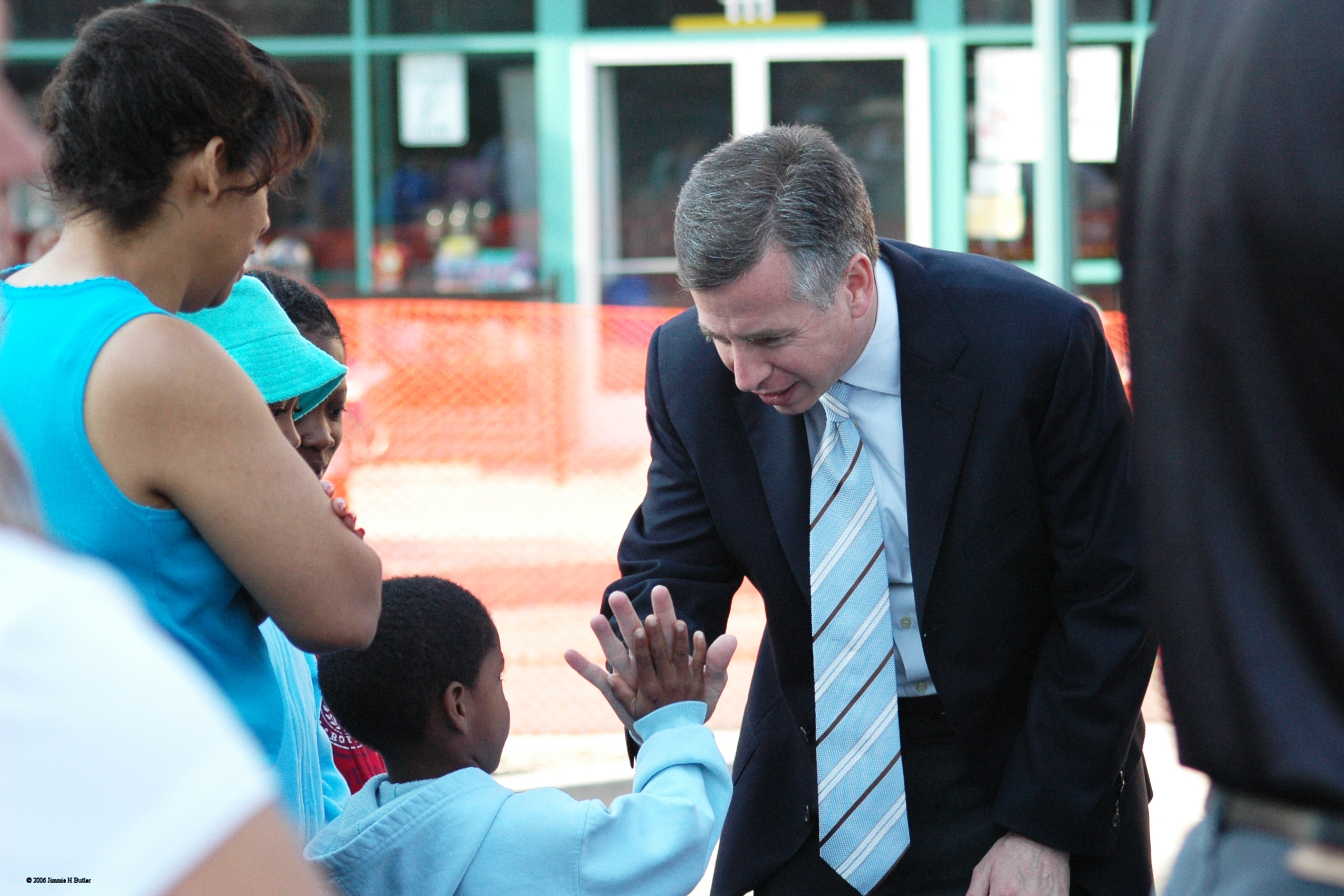

Prior to this, Holtzman was chairman of Kazkommertsbank in Kazakhstan and chairman of Meridian Capital HK, a private equity firm with investments in natural resources, real estate, food, agriculture and transportation. From 2003 through 2005, Holtzman was president of the University of Denver.

== Early career and education ==
Holtzman holds a Bachelor of Arts degree in economics from Lehigh University. Holtzman was executive director of Citizens for America, former President Ronald Reagan’s national issues advocacy group.

== Political involvement ==
In the 1980 presidential campaign, Reagan appointed Holtzman executive director of his Pennsylvania campaign, the youngest person to ever run a statewide campaign in a US presidential election.

In 1989, Holtzman was nominated by President Reagan to the Peace Corps National Advisory Council. Holtzman served in the Cabinet of former Governor Bill Owens as Colorado's first Secretary of Technology.

Holtzman unsuccessfully ran for Governor of Colorado in the 2006 Colorado gubernatorial election.

== Career ==
Holtzman was Vice Chairman of Barclays Capital and Vice Chairman ABN Amro Bank. Holtzman was co-founder and President of MeesPierson EurAmerica (a firm which was acquired by ABN Amro) and was a senior adviser to Salomon Brothers, where he lived and worked in Eastern Europe and Russia from September 1989 until October 1998. From 2003 through 2005, Holtzman was President of the University of Denver.

Holtzman was appointed by Kazakhstan's then Prime Minister Karim Massimov to the board of directors of Kazyna, the nation's sovereign wealth fund from 2006 to 2008. Holtzman was a member of the board of trustees of the United States Space Foundation from 2004 to 2010. Holtzman was a member of the board of directors of FTI Consulting from 2012 to 2015.

Since 2012, Holtzman has been chairman of Bank of Kigali in Rwanda, and became a member of the board of directors of TTEC in 2014. From 2015 to 2017, Holtzman was Chairman of the Board of Directors and later Chief Executive Officer of Kazkommertsbank, Kazakhstan’s largest bank.

Holtzman is a member of the Board of Directors of FAT Brands, a global franchisor of restaurant brands. In 2019, Holtzman was appointed Chairman of CBZ Holdings, Zimbabwe’s largest financial institution.

== Lecturer ==
Holtzman has given lectures on economic and political developments in Eastern Europe and Russia. He has advocated the process of continued market reforms and democratization.

== Philanthropy and recognition ==
Holtzman was co-founder of the Denver School for Science and Technology, a charter high school in Colorado.

The Holtzman family supports the Point Foundation, a non-profit organization creating opportunities for children and youth living in social poverty in South Africa and Rwanda.

Holtzman is a National Trustee of National Jewish Health – a leading respiratory hospital in America.

On January 24, 1999, Polish President Aleksander Kwaśniewski presented Holtzman with The Commander's Cross of the Order of Merit.
