= 2006 Colorado gubernatorial election =

- November 7, 2006
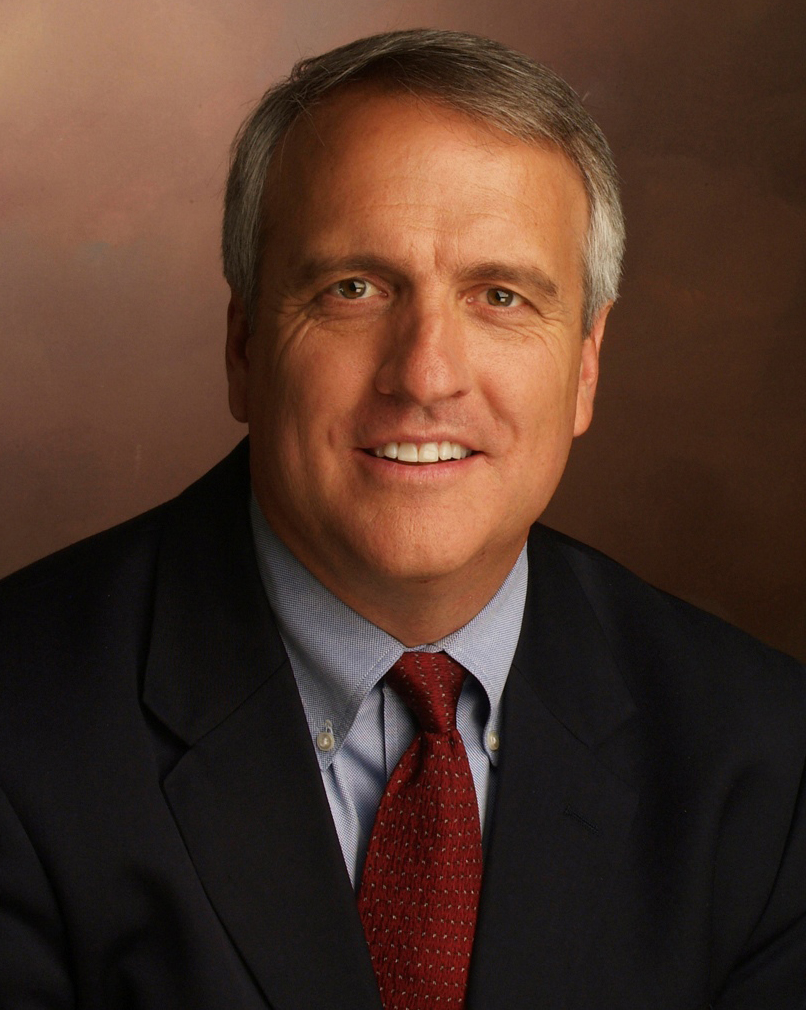

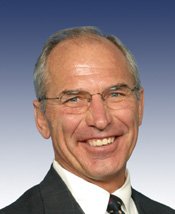
| Nominee | Bill Ritter | Bob Beauprez |
| Party | Democratic | Republican |
| Running mate | Barbara O'Brien | Janet Rowland |
| Popular vote | 887,986 | 625,886 |
| Percentage | 56.99% | 40.17% |
- County results Ritter: 40–50% 50–60% 60–70% 70–80% Beauprez: 40–50% 50–60% 60–70%
Governor before election
Bill Owens
Republican
Elected Governor
Bill Ritter
Democratic

The 2006 Colorado gubernatorial election was held on November 7, 2006. Incumbent Republican governor Bill Owens was unable to run due to term limits, and the election was won by Democratic nominee Bill Ritter.

With his win, Democrats obtained a trifecta in the state for the first time since 1963. As of 2026, this is the last time the Governor's office in Colorado changed partisan control.

== Democratic primary ==
=== Candidates ===
- Bill Ritter, former District Attorney of Denver

=== Campaign ===
In the leadup to the Democratic primary, Bill Ritter, the former District Attorney of Denver, emerged as the leading Democratic candidate. Though several other prominent state Democrats, including Denver Mayor John Hickenlooper and State House Speaker Andrew Romanoff, considered running for Governor, both ultimately declined to do so. State Representative Gary Lindstrom, the only other candidate besides Ritter in the race, ended his campaign on February 28, 2006. Ritter's personal opposition to abortion motivated pro-choice leaders in the state party to seek alternatives to him, but none ultimately materialized, and opposition to Ritter softened with his pledge to not alter the state's liberal abortion laws.

=== Results ===
Democratic primary results
| Party | Candidate | Votes | % |
|---|---|---|---|
| Democratic | Bill Ritter | 142,586 | 100.00 |
| Total votes | | 142,586 | 100.00 |

== Republican primary ==
=== Candidates ===
- Bob Beauprez, U.S. Congressman from Colorado's 7th congressional district

=== Campaign ===
With popular two-term Governor Bill Owens barred from seeking re-election, an open race developed for the Republican nomination to succeed him. The race looked like it would be between Congressman Bob Beauprez, who represented the swingy Denver suburbs in Congress, and former University of Denver President Marc Holtzman. The race between Beauprez and Holtzman was contentious. Beauprez accused Holtzman of ethics violations, including making false allegations that the campaign's email list was stolen, providing falsified poll results to the Denver Post, and using a separate state campaign committee as a "shadow gubernatorial campaign." Holtzman, meanwhile, accused Beauprez of being part of the "politics of power" that he argued had taken the party away from its conservative values, pointing to Beauprez's support of Referendum C in 2005, which allowed the state to hold onto excess tax revenues rather than refund surpluses.

In the end, the campaign between the two frontrunners fizzled. Beauprez won a landslide victory at the state Republican convention, denying Holtzman a spot on the ballot. Holtzman's efforts to collect signatures to win a spot on the ballot were ultimately in vain, with the Colorado Supreme Court ruling in June that he had failed to submit enough signatures. In response, Holtzman suspended his campaign and endorsed Beauprez, who won the Republican primary unopposed.

=== Results ===
Republican primary results
| Party | Candidate | Votes | % |
|---|---|---|---|
| Republican | Bob Beauprez | 193,804 | 100.00 |
| Total votes | | 193,804 | 100.00 |

== Campaign ==
=== Predictions ===
| Source | Ranking | As of |
|---|---|---|
| The Cook Political Report | Likely D (flip) | November 6, 2006 |
| Sabato's Crystal Ball | Likely D (flip) | November 6, 2006 |
| Rothenberg Political Report | Likely D (flip) | November 2, 2006 |
| Real Clear Politics | Likely D (flip) | November 6, 2006 |

=== Polling ===
| Poll source | Date(s) administered | Bill Ritter (D) | Bob Beauprez (R) |
|---|---|---|---|
| Survey USA | November 2, 2006 | 57% | 35% |
| Zogby/WSJ | October 31, 2006 | 46.4% | 46.6% |
| Rasmussen | October 29, 2006 | 51% | 39% |
| Survey USA | October 23, 2006 | 56% | 38% |
| Zogby/WSJ | October 19, 2006 | 46.7% | 44.7% |
| Mason Dixon | October 7, 2006 | 50% | 35% |
| Survey USA | September 28, 2006 | 55% | 38% |
| Rasmussen | September 26, 2006 | 50% | 34% |
| Rocky Mountain News | September 18, 2006 | 50% | 33% |
| Zogby/WSJ | September 11, 2006 | 47.5% | 38.9% |
| Zogby/WSJ | August 28, 2006 | 46.0% | 38.7% |
| Survey USA | August 17, 2006 | 50% | 40% |
| Rasmussen | August 11, 2006 | 48% | 39% |
| Zogby/WSJ | July 24, 2006 | 42.8% | 40.9% |
| Mason Dixon | July 17, 2006 | 42% | 35% |
| Rasmussen | July 10, 2006** | 42% | 37% |
| Zogby/WSJ | June 21, 2006 | 44.2% | 36.1% |
| Rasmussen | June 8, 2006 | 43% | 38% |
| Rasmussen | May 5, 2006 | 37% | 39% |
| Rasmussen | April 5, 2006 | 41% | 40% |
| Rasmussen | February 25, 2006 | 40% | 33% |
| Rasmussen | January 26, 2006 | 38% | 39% |

== Results ==
2006 Colorado gubernatorial election
| Party | Candidate | Votes | % | ±% |
|---|---|---|---|---|
| Democratic | Bill Ritter | 887,986 | 56.99% | +23.33% |
| Republican | Bob Beauprez | 625,886 | 40.17% | −22.46% |
| Libertarian | Dawn Winkler-Kinateder | 23,323 | 1.50% | +0.04% |
| Independent | Paul Noel Fiorino | 10,996 | 0.71% | — |
| Constitution | Clyde J. Harkins | 9,716 | 0.62% | +0.62% |
| Write-ins | | 370 | 0.02% | — |
| Majority | | 262,100 | 16.82% | −12.15% |
| Turnout | | 1,558,277 | | |
| Democratic gain from Republican | | | | |

=== By county ===
| County | Bill Ritter Democratic | | Bob Beauprez Republican | | Various candidates Other parties | | Margin | | Total |
| County | # | % | # | % | # | % | # | % | Total |
|---|---|---|---|---|---|---|---|---|---|
| Adams | 55,930 | 60.04% | 34,607 | 37.15% | 2,611 | 2.81% | 21,323 | 22.89% | 93,148 |
| Alamosa | 3,098 | 64.84% | 1,589 | 33.26% | 91 | 1.90% | 1,509 | 31.58% | 4,778 |
| Arapahoe | 98,203 | 58.00% | 66,907 | 39.51% | 4,212 | 2.49% | 31,296 | 18.49% | 169,322 |
| Archuleta | 2,274 | 49.19% | 2,227 | 48.17% | 122 | 2.64% | 47 | 1.02% | 4,623 |
| Baca | 783 | 41.89% | 1,022 | 54.68% | 64 | 3.43% | -239 | -12.79% | 1,869 |
| Bent | 910 | 56.63% | 657 | 40.88% | 40 | 2.49% | 253 | 15.75% | 1,607 |
| Boulder | 84,235 | 71.19% | 30,974 | 26.18% | 3,122 | 2.63% | 53,261 | 45.01% | 118,331 |
| Broomfield | 10,517 | 56.75% | 7,544 | 40.71% | 470 | 2.54% | 2,973 | 16.04% | 18,531 |
| Chaffee | 4,298 | 57.77% | 2,940 | 39.52% | 202 | 2.71% | 1,358 | 18.25% | 7,440 |
| Cheyenne | 339 | 35.46% | 598 | 62.55% | 19 | 1.99% | -259 | -27.09% | 956 |
| Clear Creek | 2,708 | 61.32% | 1,516 | 34.33% | 192 | 4.35% | 1,192 | 26.99% | 4,416 |
| Conejos | 2,063 | 64.61% | 1,055 | 33.04% | 75 | 2.35% | 1,008 | 31.57% | 3,193 |
| Costilla | 1,146 | 77.85% | 293 | 19.90% | 33 | 2.25% | 853 | 57.95% | 1,472 |
| Crowley | 594 | 47.07% | 625 | 49.52% | 43 | 3.41% | -31 | -2.45% | 1,262 |
| Custer | 788 | 42.12% | 1,042 | 55.69% | 41 | 2.19% | -254 | -13.57% | 1,871 |
| Delta | 5,078 | 44.84% | 5,748 | 50.76% | 498 | 4.40% | -674 | -5.92% | 11,324 |
| Denver | 121,494 | 77.16% | 31,851 | 20.23% | 4,109 | 2.61% | 90,643 | 56.93% | 157,454 |
| Dolores | 527 | 53.23% | 432 | 43.64% | 31 | 3.13% | 95 | 9.59% | 990 |
| Douglas | 36,364 | 45.25% | 42,493 | 52.87% | 1,509 | 1.88% | -6,129 | -7.62% | 80,366 |
| Eagle | 8,158 | 62.68% | 4,492 | 34.51% | 363 | 2.81% | 3,666 | 28.17% | 13,015 |
| El Paso | 69,237 | 39.77% | 99,613 | 57.22% | 5,248 | 3.01% | -30,376 | -17.45% | 174,098 |
| Elbert | 3,134 | 35.53% | 5,463 | 61.94% | 223 | 2.54% | -2,329 | -26.41% | 8,820 |
| Fremont | 6,768 | 48.13% | 6,872 | 48.87% | 423 | 3.00% | -104 | -0.74% | 14,063 |
| Garfield | 8,602 | 56.70% | 6,043 | 39.83% | 526 | 3.47% | 2,559 | 16.87% | 15,171 |
| Gilpin | 1,551 | 63.18% | 769 | 31.32% | 135 | 5.50% | 782 | 31.86% | 2,455 |
| Grand | 3,149 | 53.02% | 2,620 | 44.12% | 170 | 2.86% | 529 | 8.90% | 5,939 |
| Gunnison | 4,154 | 65.88% | 1,793 | 28.44% | 358 | 5.68% | 2,361 | 37.44% | 6,305 |
| Hinsdale | 252 | 50.40% | 220 | 44.00% | 28 | 5.60% | 32 | 6.40% | 500 |
| Huerfano | 1,910 | 65.73% | 921 | 31.69% | 75 | 2.58% | 989 | 34.04% | 2,906 |
| Jackson | 302 | 40.05% | 406 | 53.85% | 46 | 6.10% | -104 | -13.80% | 754 |
| Jefferson | 119,420 | 57.54% | 82,314 | 39.66% | 5,825 | 2.80% | 37,106 | 17.88% | 207,559 |
| Kiowa | 313 | 38.88% | 478 | 59.38% | 14 | 1.74% | -165 | -20.50% | 805 |
| Kit Carson | 1,131 | 40.58% | 1,582 | 56.76% | 74 | 2.66% | -451 | -16.18% | 2,787 |
| La Plata | 11,962 | 62.48% | 6,666 | 34.82% | 518 | 2.70% | 5,296 | 27.66% | 19,146 |
| Lake | 1,517 | 64.91% | 709 | 30.34% | 111 | 4.75% | 808 | 34.57% | 2,337 |
| Larimer | 63,297 | 56.05% | 45,700 | 40.47% | 3,932 | 3.48% | 17,597 | 15.58% | 112,929 |
| Las Animas | 3,243 | 66.62% | 1,501 | 30.83% | 124 | 2.55% | 1,742 | 35.79% | 4,868 |
| Lincoln | 737 | 40.25% | 1,030 | 56.25% | 64 | 3.50% | -293 | -16.00% | 1,831 |
| Logan | 3,559 | 47.03% | 3,821 | 50.50% | 187 | 2.47% | -262 | -3.47% | 7,567 |
| Mesa | 21,475 | 45.99% | 23,444 | 50.20% | 1,780 | 3.81% | -1,969 | -4.21% | 46,699 |
| Mineral | 338 | 57.98% | 235 | 40.31% | 10 | 1.71% | 103 | 17.67% | 583 |
| Moffat | 1,750 | 42.07% | 2,216 | 53.27% | 194 | 4.66% | -466 | -11.20% | 4,160 |
| Montezuma | 4,146 | 48.18% | 4,263 | 49.54% | 197 | 2.28% | -117 | -1.36% | 8,606 |
| Montrose | 5,639 | 46.07% | 6,067 | 49.56% | 535 | 4.37% | -428 | -3.49% | 12,241 |
| Morgan | 3,419 | 44.92% | 3,997 | 52.51% | 174 | 2.57% | -578 | -7.60% | 7,612 |
| Otero | 3,432 | 55.52% | 2,603 | 42.11% | 146 | 2.37% | 829 | 13.41% | 6,181 |
| Ouray | 1,289 | 56.56% | 916 | 40.19% | 74 | 3.25% | 373 | 16.37% | 2,279 |
| Park | 3,208 | 47.23% | 3,293 | 48.48% | 291 | 4.29% | -85 | -1.25% | 6,792 |
| Phillips | 773 | 42.92% | 998 | 55.41% | 30 | 1.67% | -225 | -12.49% | 1,801 |
| Pitkin | 5,095 | 76.14% | 1,428 | 21.34% | 172 | 2.52% | 3,667 | 54.80% | 6,692 |
| Prowers | 1,549 | 46.85% | 1,688 | 51.06% | 69 | 2.09% | -139 | -4.21% | 3,306 |
| Pueblo | 34,968 | 67.19% | 16,094 | 30.93% | 979 | 1.88% | 18,874 | 36.26% | 52,041 |
| Rio Blanco | 773 | 35.92% | 1,305 | 60.64% | 74 | 3.44% | -532 | -24.72% | 2,152 |
| Rio Grande | 2,284 | 53.59% | 1,884 | 44.20% | 94 | 2.21% | 400 | 9.39% | 4,262 |
| Routt | 5,172 | 66.19% | 2,452 | 31.38% | 190 | 2.43% | 2,720 | 34.81% | 7,814 |
| Saguache | 1,466 | 67.00% | 632 | 28.88% | 90 | 4.12% | 834 | 38.12% | 2,188 |
| San Juan | 255 | 65.72% | 114 | 29.38% | 19 | 4.90% | 141 | 36.34% | 388 |
| San Miguel | 1,991 | 73.63% | 594 | 21.97% | 119 | 4.40% | 1,397 | 51.66% | 2,704 |
| Sedgwick | 575 | 49.27% | 568 | 48.67% | 24 | 2.06% | 7 | 0.60% | 1,167 |
| Summit | 6,683 | 67.36% | 2,939 | 29.62% | 300 | 3.02% | 3,744 | 37.74% | 9,922 |
| Teller | 3,383 | 39.09% | 4,981 | 57.55% | 291 | 3.36% | -1,598 | -18.46% | 8,655 |
| Washington | 672 | 32.26% | 1,359 | 65.24% | 52 | 2.50% | -687 | -32.97% | 2,083 |
| Weld | 32,677 | 48.37% | 32,398 | 47.96% | 2,502 | 3.67% | 279 | 0.41% | 67,577 |
| Yuma | 1,339 | 36.25% | 2,285 | 61.86% | 70 | 1.89% | -946 | -25.61% | 3,694 |
| Totals | 888,096 | 56.99% | 625,886 | 40.16% | 44,405 | 2.85% | 262,210 | 16.83% | 1,558,387 |

Counties that flipped from Republican to Democratic

- Adams (largest city: Thornton)
- Arapahoe (largest city: Aurora)
- Bent (Largest city: Las Animas)
- Broomfield
- Weld (largest city: Greeley)
- Sedgwick (Largest city: Julesburg)
- Larimer (largest city: Fort Collins)
- Grand (Largest city: Granby)
- Routt (Largest city: Steamboat Springs)
- Garfield (largest municipality: Glenwood Springs)
- Eagle (largest municipality: Edwards)
- Summit (largest municipality: Breckenridge)
- Jefferson (largest city: Lakewood)
- Clear Creek (largest city: Idaho Springs)
- Gilpin (largest city: Central City)
- Chaffee (largest city: Salida)
- Gunnison (Largest city: Gunnison)
- Lake (Largest city: Leadville)
- Pitkin (Largest city: Aspen)
- Dolores (largest city: Dove Creek)
- Ouray (largest city: Ouray)
- La Plata (largest municipality: Durango)
- San Juan (largest municipality: Silverton)
- Hinsdale (Largest city: Lake City)
- Rio Grande (Largest city: Monte Vista)
- Archuleta (Largest city: Pagosa Springs)
- Mineral (Largest city: Creede)
- Conejos (largest municipality: Manassa)
- Huerfano (largest city: Walsenburg)
- Alamosa (largest municipality: Alamosa)
- Costilla (largest municipality: San Luis)
- Las Animas (largest city: Trinidad)
- Saguache (largest city: Center)
- Otero (Largest city: La Junta)

== See also ==
- 2006 United States gubernatorial elections
- State of Colorado
- Governors of Colorado
- List of Colorado ballot measures
