= 2023 Denver mayoral election =

- April 4, 2023 (first round); June 6, 2023 (runoff)
- Turnout: 33.49% (first round); 31.13% (runoff)
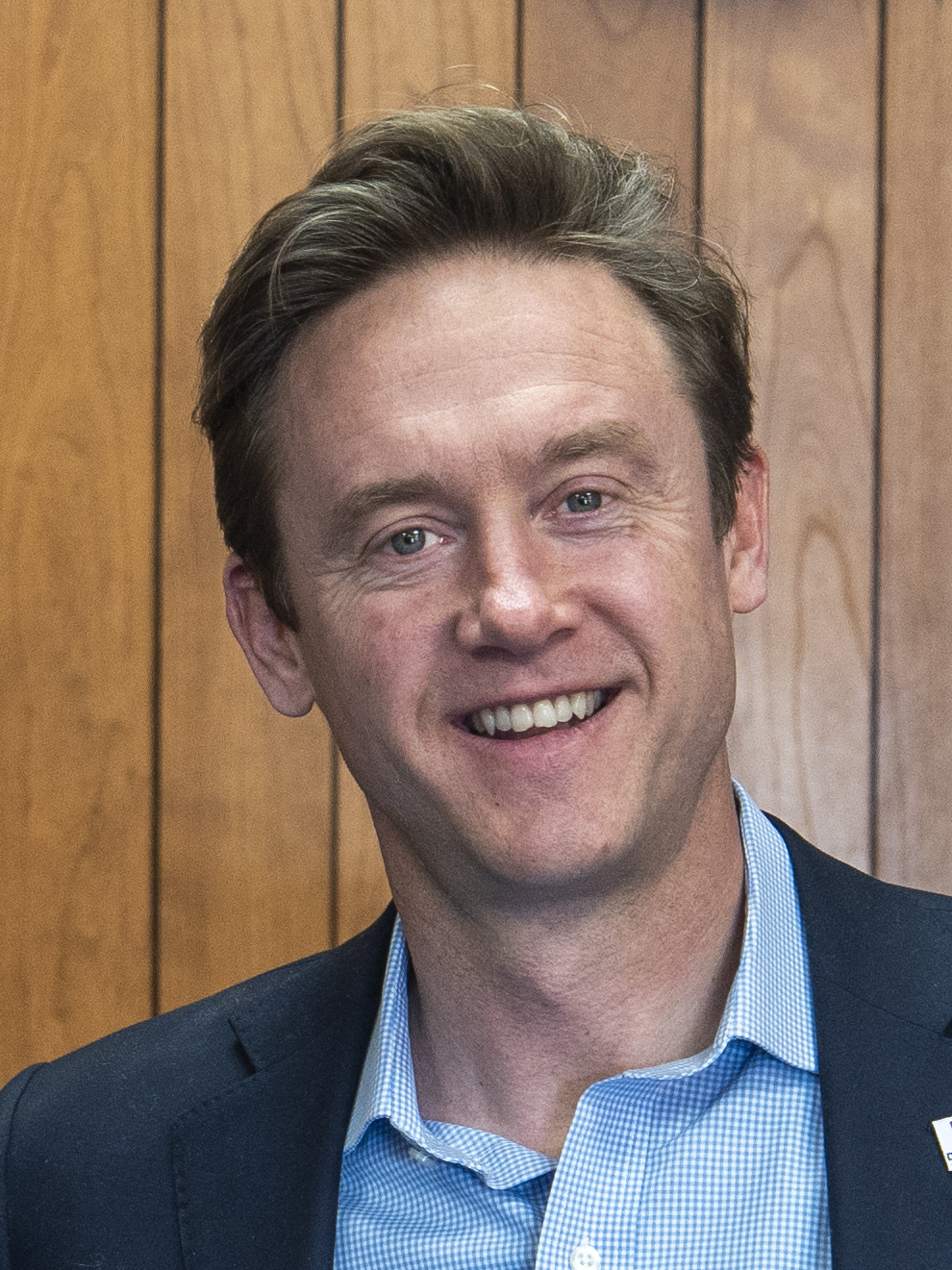

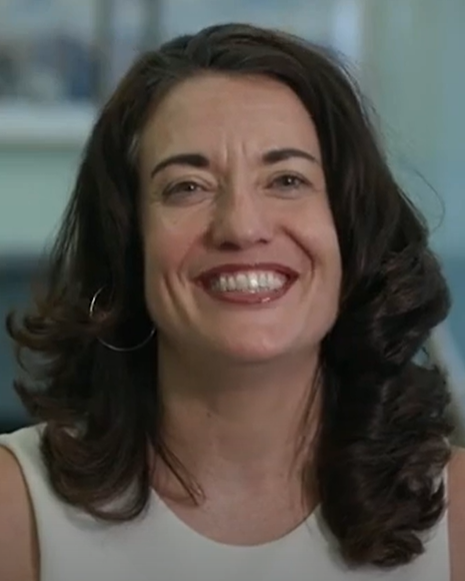

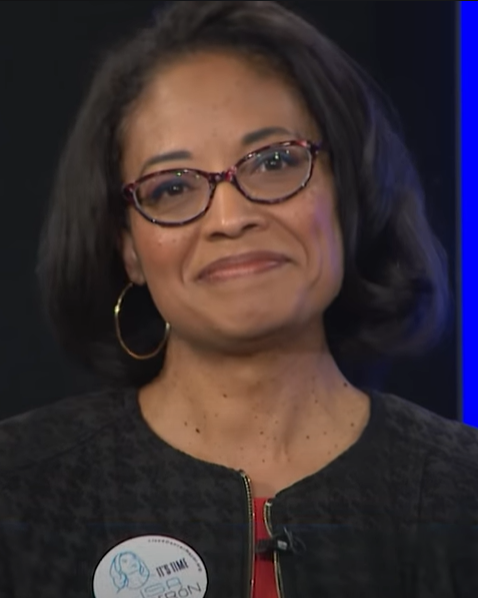

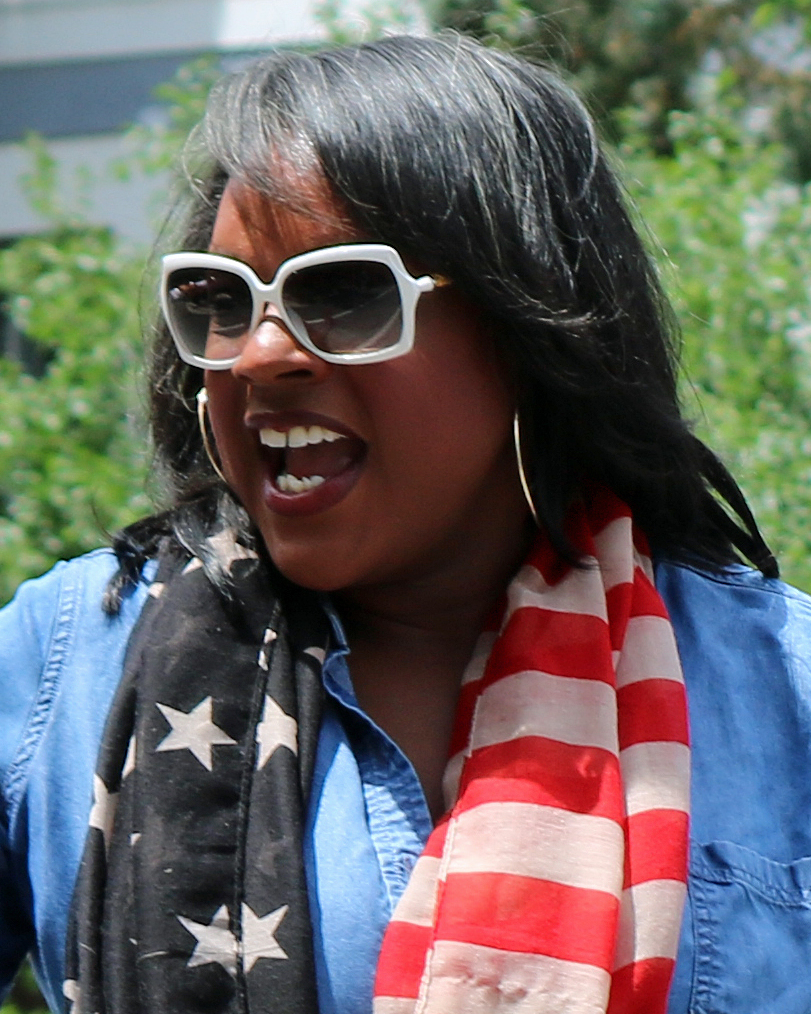
Candidate	Mike Johnston	Kelly Brough	Lisa Calderón
First round	42,273; 24.45%	34,627; 20.03%	31,493; 18.21%
Runoff	89,889; 55.15%	73,097; 44.85%	Eliminated
Candidate	Andy Rougeot	Leslie Herod
First round	19,927; 11.52%	18,506; 10.70%
Runoff	Eliminated	Eliminated
Mayor before election
Michael Hancock
Democratic
Elected mayor
Mike Johnston
Democratic

The 2023 Denver mayoral election was held on April 4, 2023, to elect the mayor of Denver, Colorado, with a runoff held on June 6. The election was officially nonpartisan and was held concurrently with elections for the Denver City Council, as well as city auditor and city clerk and recorder. Incumbent mayor Michael Hancock was term-limited and could not seek a fourth term in office. A historic field of seventeen candidates filed to run in the race to succeed Hancock.

Since no candidate won a majority in the first round, former state senator Mike Johnston and former Denver Metro Chamber of Commerce CEO Kelly Brough advanced to a runoff. Candidates eliminated in the first round included Emerge Colorado executive director Lisa Calderón, maintenance executive Andy Rougeot, and state representative Leslie Herod. Brough and Johnston were considered to be two of the more moderate candidates in the field, with the more progressive candidates like Calderón and Herod losing in the initial primary.

Although Brough and Johnston shared similar ideological positions, Johnston was supported by leading progressive figures in the runoff, including Calderón and Herod, while Brough was supported by more conservative groups, including the local police union and the Denver Republican Party. Johnston won the runoff by a comfortable margin, with Brough conceding the race on the night of the election.

== Candidates ==
=== Advanced to the runoff ===
These candidates advanced to the runoff election to be held on June 6.

- Kelly Brough, former Denver Metro Chamber of Commerce CEO and former chief of staff to then-mayor John Hickenlooper (Party affiliation: Democratic)
- Mike Johnston, former state senator, candidate for governor in 2018, and candidate for U.S. Senate in 2020 (Party affiliation: Democratic)

=== Eliminated in the first round ===
These candidates qualified to appear on the ballot, but were eliminated in the first round.

- Renate Behrens, retired caretaker (endorsed Brough in runoff)
- Lisa Calderón, executive director of Emerge Colorado, former chief of staff to city councilor Candi CdeBaca, and candidate for mayor in 2019 (Party affiliation: Democratic) (endorsed Johnston in runoff)
- Al Gardner, information technology professional and Denver Civil Service Commission member (Party affiliation: Democratic) (endorsed Johnston in runoff)
- Chris Hansen, state senator (Party affiliation: Democratic) (endorsed Brough in runoff)
- Leslie Herod, state representative (Party affiliation: Democratic) (endorsed Johnston in runoff)
- Paul Noel Fiorino, dance teacher and perennial candidate (Party affiliation: Independent) (ran a write-in campaign)
- Marcus Giavanni, perennial candidate (ran a write-in campaign)
- Aurelio Martinez, tech worker and former boxer
- Debbie Ortega, at-large city councilor (Party affiliation: Democratic)
- Terrance Roberts, community organizer (Party affiliation: Democratic) (endorsed Johnston in runoff)
- Trinidad Rodriguez, financing executive and former Denver Housing Authority commissioner
- Andy Rougeot, maintenance executive (Party affiliation: Republican)
- Ean Tafoya, community organizer and former Colorado Environmental Justice Action Task Force co-chair (Party affiliation: Democratic) (endorsed Johnston in runoff)
- Robert Treta, property builder (Party affiliation: Independent) (endorsed Brough in runoff)
- James Walsh, University of Colorado Denver professor (endorsed Johnston in runoff)
- Thomas Wolf, investment banker and candidate for mayor in 2011 (endorsed Brough in runoff)

=== Disqualified ===
- Abass Bamba, data consulting firm president (ran a write-in campaign)
- Matt Brady (ran a write-in campaign)
- Alex Cowans
- Sean Gallegos
- Sylvia Herring
- Jesse Parris, community organizer (ran a write-in campaign)
- Ken Simpson, tech consultant and perennial candidate

=== Withdrew ===
- Anna Burrell, sustainability consulting executive (endorsed Calderón)
- Kwame Spearman, CEO of Tattered Cover (remained on ballot; endorsed Brough)
- David Stevens, language tutoring school founder
- Alex Valdez, state representative (Party affiliation: Democratic) (endorsed Brough in runoff)

=== Declined ===
- Auon'tai Anderson, Denver Board of Education vice president (ran for re-election, endorsed Herod)
- Albus Brooks, construction executive and former Denver City Council president from the 9th district (endorsed Johnston)
- Candi CdeBaca, city councilor for district 9 (Party affiliation: Democratic) (ran for re-election, endorsed Calderón)
- Stephan Evans, activist and candidate for mayor in 2015 and 2019
- Kevin Flynn, city councilor for district 2 (Party affiliation: Democratic) (ran for re-election)
- Alec Garnett, former Colorado House of Representatives speaker (Party affiliation: Democratic)
- Stacie Gilmore, city councilor and former council president (Party affiliation: Democratic) (ran for re-election)
- Cary Kennedy, senior advisor to governor Jared Polis, former Colorado State Treasurer, former deputy mayor of Denver, and candidate for governor in 2018 (Party affiliation: Democratic)
- Robin Kniech, at-large city councilor (Party affiliation: Democratic)
- James Mejia, president of Denver Film and candidate for mayor in 2011
- Tim O'Brien, Denver City Auditor (ran for re-election)
- Paul Pazen, former Denver Police Department chief
- Penfield Tate III, former state senator and candidate for mayor in 2003 and 2019 (Party affiliation: Democratic) (ran for city council)

== First round ==
=== Fundraising ===
Campaign finance reports as of March 14, 2023
Candidate	Contributions	Fair Elections Fund payouts	Expenditures	Cash on hand
Renate Behrens	$429	$0	$408	$21
Kelly Brough	$644,299	$750,000	$790,625 (Note: Brough also benefitted from $904,950 in independent expenditures by the group A Better Denver.)	$382,544
Lisa Calderón	$69,013	$195,351	$127,457 (Note: Calderón also had $731 spent against her by the group Save Denver Now.)	$58,161
Al Gardner	$13,770	$0	$8,682	$5,088
Chris Hansen	$200,675	$375,187	$440,197 (Note: Hansen also benefitted from $26,000 in independent expenditures by the group A Better Denver.)	$18,532
Leslie Herod	$332,646	$587,057	$608,704 (Note: Herod also benefitted from $167,600 in independent expenditures by the group Ready Denver. She also had $4,651 spent against her by the group Save Denver Now.)	$162,726
Mike Johnston	$547,004	$613,539	$580,999 (Note: Johnston also benefitted from $1,411,803 in independent expenditures by the group Advancing Denver.)	$220,684
Aurelio Martinez	$12,124	$37,259	$15,645	$33,744
Debbie Ortega	$144,186	$249,705	$254,685 (Note: Ortega also benefitted from $120,397 in independent expenditures by Denver Firefighters (International Association of Fire Fighters Local 858) and $10,000 by the group Protecting Denver's Future.)	$81,326
Terrance Roberts	$26,482	$73,908	$78,870	$11,043
Trinidad Rodriguez	$58,166	$120,243	$80,735	$72,696
Andy Rougeot	$806,000 (Note: $750,000 of this total was self-funded by Rougeot.)	$0	$752,359	$46,951
Kwame Spearman	$100,266	$188,406	$206,524	$17,182
Ean Tafoya	$47,556	$153,713	$144,029 (Note: Tafoya also had $678 spent against him by the group Save Denver Now.)	$11,796
Robert Treta	$125	$0	$0	$125
James Walsh	$15,521	$51,219	$26,034	$33,991
Thomas Wolf	$21,485	$105,329	$111,805	$7,324

=== Endorsements ===
Kelly Brough (D)

Statewide officials

- Bill Ritter, former governor of Colorado (2007–2011)

Local officials

- Chris Herndon, city councilor from the 8th district (2015–present)
- Bill Vidal, former acting mayor of Denver (2011)

Individuals

- Kwame Spearman, CEO of Tattered Cover and former 2023 mayoral candidate

Organizations

- Denver Metro Association of Realtors

Newspapers

- The Denver Gazette
Lisa Calderón (D)

State officials

- Lisa Escarcega, Colorado State Board of Education member from the 1st district (2021–present)

State legislators

- Elisabeth Epps, state representative from the 6th district (2023–present)

Local officials

- Candi CdeBaca, city councilor from the 9th district (2019–present)
- Xochitl Gaytan, Denver Board of Education president (2022–present) from the 2nd district (2021–present)

Organizations

- Colorado Working Families Party
- Denver Democratic Socialists of America
Chris Hansen (D)

Statewide officials

- Roy Romer, former governor of Colorado (1987–1999), former National Governors Association chair (1992–1993), and former Los Angeles Unified School District superintendent (2000–2006)

State senators;

- Lois Court, former Colorado Senate president pro tempore (2019–2020) from the 31st district (2017–2020)
- Kevin Priola, state senator from the 13th district (2017–present)

State representatives

- Judith Amabile, state representative from the 49th district (2021–present)

Organizations

- 314 Action
- International Brotherhood of Teamsters Locals 17 and 455
Leslie Herod (D)

Statewide officials

- Wanda James, University of Colorado regent from the 1st district (2023–present)
- Dean Williams, former Colorado Department of Corrections executive director (2019–2022) and former Alaska Department of Corrections commissioner (2016–2018)

State legislators

- Faith Winter, state senator from the 25th district (2019–2025)

Local officials

- Auon'tai Anderson, Denver Board of Education vice president (2022–present)
- Wellington Webb, former mayor of Denver (1991–2003) and former United States Conference of Mayors president (1999–2000)

Individuals

- Dottie Lamm, former first lady of Colorado (1975–1987) (also served as campaign treasurer)
- Bobby LeFebre, Colorado poet laureate

Organizations

- LGBTQ Victory Fund
Mike Johnston (D)

Local officials

- Albus Brooks, former Denver City Council president (2015–2019) from the 9th district (2011–2019)

Individuals

- Reid Hoffman, co-founder and executive chairman of LinkedIn

Newspapers

- The Denver Post
Debbie Ortega (D)

State senators

- Irene Aguilar, former state senator from the 32nd district (2011–2019)
- Polly Baca, former state senator from the 25th district (1979–1987)
- Jessie Danielson, state senator from the 22nd district (2019–present)
- Joan Fitz-Gerald, former Colorado Senate president (2005–2007) from the 16th district (2001–2007)
- Lucía Guzmán, former Colorado Senate minority leader (2015–2018) from the 34th district (2010–2019)

State representatives

- Susan Lontine, former state representative from the 1st district (2015–2023)

Newspapers

- El Semanario

Labor unions

- American Federation of State, County and Municipal Employees Council 76
- International Association of Fire Fighters Local 858
- UNITE HERE Local 23
- Fraternal Order of Police Lodge 27
- United Brotherhood of Carpenters and Joiners of America Southwest Mountain States Regional Council
- United Food and Commercial Workers Local 7
Andy Rougeot (R)

Organizations

- Colorado Republican Party

=== Polling ===
Poll source	Date(s) administered	Sample size (Note: Key: A – all adults RV – registered voters LV – likely voters V – unclear)	Margin of error	Kelly Brough	Lisa Calderón	Chris Hansen	Leslie Herod	Mike Johnston	Debbie Ortega	Andy Rougeot	Ean Tafoya	Other	Undecided
SurveyUSA/9News	February 21–28, 2023	594 (LV)	± 4.9%	5%	5%	4%	3%	5%	4%	2%	1%	13% (Note: Al Gardner and Thomas Wolf with 3%; Trinidad Rodriguez and Terrance Roberts with 2%; Renate Behrens, Kwame Spearman, and Aurelio Martinez with 1%; James Walsh and Robert Treta with 0%)	58%
Chism Strategies (D)/Cygnal (R) (Note: This poll was conducted for A Denver for Us All, a business coalition.)	February 9–10, 2023	405 (LV)	± 4.9%	8%	3%	4%	6%	5%	4%	3%	–	9%	59%
Searchlight Research (D) (Note: This poll was conducted for Debbie Ortega)	January 11–14, 2023	500 (LV)	± 4%	4%	8%	6%	8%	6%	16%	–	1%	3% (Note: Alex Valdez with 2%; every other candidate combined for 1%)	47%

=== Results ===
First-round turnout map by precinct

2023 Denver mayoral election
Candidate	Votes	%
Mike Johnston	42,273	24.45
Kelly Brough	34,627	20.03
Lisa Calderón	31,493	18.21
Andy Rougeot	19,927	11.52
Leslie Herod	18,506	10.70
Chris Hansen	8,309	4.81
Debbie Ortega	7,739	4.48
Ean Tafoya	2,700	1.56
Terrance Roberts	1,757	1.02
Thomas Wolf	1,747	1.01
Trinidad Rodriguez	1,240	0.72
Aurelio Martinez	755	0.44
Al Gardner	725	0.42
James Walsh	722	0.42
Renate Behrens	184	0.11
Robert Treta	169	0.10
Write-in	45	0.03
Valid votes	172,918	98.48%
Invalid or blank votes	2,670	1.52
Total votes	175,588	100.00
Turnout		33.49%

== Runoff ==
=== Endorsements ===
Endorsements in bold were made after the first round.

Kelly Brough (D)

Federal officials

- **Katherine Archuleta**, former U.S. Office of Personnel Management director (2013–2015)
- **Susan Barnes-Gelt**, former President's Committee on the Arts and Humanities member (1993–1995) and former at-large city councilor (1995–2003)
- **Denise Maes**, former Executive Office of the President general counsel (2009–2010) and former Colorado American Civil Liberties Union public policy director (2012–2021)
- **Amber McReynolds**, U.S. Postal Service governor (2021–present)
- **Rosemary Rodriguez**, former Election Assistance Commissioner (2007–2009)
- **John Walsh**, former U.S. attorney for the District of Colorado (2010–2016)

Statewide officials

- **Vicki Cowart**, former Colorado Geological Survey director (1993–2003) and former Planned Parenthood of the Rocky Mountains president (2003–2022)
- **Lisa Escarcega**, Colorado State Board of Education member from the 1st district (2021–present) (endorsed Calderón in first round)
- **Wanda James**, University of Colorado regent from the 1st district (2023–present) (endorsed Herod in first round)
- Bill Ritter, former governor of Colorado (2007–2011)
- **Gail Schoettler**, former lieutenant governor of Colorado (1995–1999)
- **Larry Trujillo**, former Colorado Division of Homeland Security and Emergency Management director (2010–2011) and former Denver Fire Department chief (2003–2007)

State senators

- **Joan Fitz-Gerald**, former Colorado Senate president (2005–2007), SD-16 (2001–2007) (endorsed Ortega in first round)
- **Joyce Foster**, SD-35 (2009–2013)
- **Lucía Guzmán**, former Colorado Senate minority leader (2015–2018), SD-34 (2010–2019) (endorsed Ortega in first round)
- **Chris Hansen**, SD-31 (2020–present) and former 2023 mayoral candidate
- **Patricia Pascoe**, SD-34 (1989–2003) and biographer

State representatives

- **Rosemary Marshall**, HD-8 (2001–2008)
- **Alex Valdez**, HD-5 (2019–present) and former 2023 mayoral candidate
- **Wilma Webb**, HD-8 (1980–1993) and former first lady of Denver (1991–2003)
- **Steven Woodrow**, HD-2 (2020–present)

Municipal officials

- **Leslie Summey**, Arapahoe County commissioner from the 4th district (2023–present)

Local officials

- **Herb Atchison**, former mayor of Westminster (2013–2021)
- **Kendra Black**, city councilor from the 4th district (2015–present)
- **Carol Boigon**, former at-large city councilor (2003–2011) and 2011 mayoral candidate
- **Susan Casey**, former city councilor from the 6th district (1995–2001) and 2003 mayoral candidate
- **Kevin Flynn**, city councilor from the 2nd district (2015–present)
- **Perla Gheiler**, Denver Office of Aging director (2017–present)
- Chris Herndon, city councilor from the 8th district (2015–present)
- **Marcia Johnson**, former city councilor from the 5th district (2003–2011)
- **Al Lacabe**, former Denver Department of Public Safety chief (2003–2010)
- **Michelle Lucero**, former Denver city attorney (2005–2006)
- **Jackie Millet**, mayor of Lone Tree (2016–present)
- **Wayne New**, former city councilor from the 10th district (2015–2019)
- **Nick Nuanes**, former Denver Fire Department chief (2007–2009)
- **Adam Paul**, mayor of Lakewood (2015–present)
- **Jeanne Robb**, former city councilor from the 10th district (2003–2015)
- **Tim Sandos**, former at-large city councilor (1989–1993)
- **Amanda Sawyer**, city councilor from the 5th district (2019–present)
- **Bud Starker**, mayor of Wheat Ridge (2017–present)
- **Wade Troxell**, former mayor of Fort Collins (2015–2021) and former Northern Colorado Regional Airport Board of Commissioners chair (2015–2021)
- Bill Vidal, former acting mayor of Denver (2011)
- **Wellington Webb**, former mayor of Denver (1991–2003) and former U.S. Conference of Mayors president (1999–2000) (endorsed Herod in first round)
- **Laura Weinberg**, mayor of Golden (2019–present)
- **Marc Williams**, mayor of Arvada (2011–present)

Party officials

- **Beverly Benavidez-Ryken**, former Colorado Democratic Party 1st vice chair (2011–2017)
- **Howard Chou**, former Colorado Democratic Party 1st vice chair (2018–2023)
- **Marc Kamin**, former Denver Democratic Party chair (2019–2023)
- **Lisa Neal Graves**, former Colorado Democratic Party 2nd vice chair (2022–2023)
- **Rick Palacio**, former Colorado Democratic Party chair (2011–2017)
- **Susan Rogers**, former Denver Democratic Party secretary (1999–2003)
- **Patricia Shaver**, former Colorado Democratic Party 2nd vice chair (2017–2019)

Individuals

- Kwame Spearman, CEO of Tattered Cover and former 2023 mayoral candidate
- **Renate Behrens**, retired caretaker and former 2023 mayoral candidate
- **Robert Treta**, property builder and former 2023 mayoral candidate
- **Thomas Wolf**, investment banker and former 2011 and 2023 mayoral candidate

Labor unions

- **Denver United Association Locals 3 and 208**
- **Denver Plumbers Local 3**
- **Denver Police Protective Association**
- **Fraternal Order of Police Sheriff Lodge 27** (endorsed Ortega in first round)
- **International Association of Fire Fighters Local 858** (endorsed Ortega in first round)

Newspapers

- **Glendale Cherry Creek Chronicle**
- **La Voz Bilingüe Colorado**
- The Denver Gazette

Organizations

- Denver Metro Association of Realtors
- **Hispanic Contractors of Colorado**
- Home Builders Association of Metro Denver

Political parties

- **Denver Republican Party**
Mike Johnston (D)

Federal officials

- **Rick Garcia**, former U.S. Department of Housing and Urban Development regional administrator (2010–2017) and former city councilor from the 1st district (2003–2010)
- **Federico Peña**, former U.S. Secretary of Energy (1997–1998), former U.S. Secretary of Transportation (1993–1997), and former mayor of Denver (1983–1991)

U.S. representatives

- **Brittany Pettersen**, U.S. representative for Colorado's 7th district (2023–present)

Statewide officials

- **Celina Benavidez**, former Colorado Department of Transportation director (1994–2009) and former state representative from the 5th district (1991–1994)
- **Cole Chandler**, Colorado Department of Human Services director of homelessness initiatives (2022–present)
- **Ean Tafoya**, Colorado Environmental Justice Action Task Force member (2021–present) and former 2023 mayoral candidate

State senators

- **Irene Aguilar**, SD-32 (2011–2019)
- **Polly Baca**, SD-25 (1979–1987)
- **Jeff Bridges**, SD-26 (2019–present)
- **Janet Buckner**, SD-29 (2021–present)
- **Morgan Carroll**, former Colorado Senate president (2013–2015), SD-39 (2009–2017), former Colorado Democratic Party chair (2017–2023)
- **James Coleman**, Colorado Senate president pro tempore (2023–present), SD-33 (2021–present)
- **Julie Gonzales**, SD-34 (2019–present)
- **Peter Groff**, former Colorado Senate president (2008–2009), SD-33 (2003–2009)
- **Doug Linkhart**, SD-31 (2001–2003), former at-large city councilor (2003–2011), 2011 mayoral candidate
- **John Morse**, former Colorado Senate president (2013), SD-11 (2007–2013)
- **Kevin Priola**, SD-13 (2017–present)
- **Paula Sandoval**, SD-34 (2003–2010) and former city councilor from the 1st district (2010–2011)
- **Tom Sullivan**, SD-27 (2023–present)
- **Faith Winter**, SD-25 (2019–present)

State representatives

- **Jennifer Bacon**, HD-7 (2021–present)
- **Adrienne Benavidez**, former Colorado House of Representatives speaker pro tempore (2021–2023), HD-32 (2017–2023)
- **Terrance Carroll**, former Colorado House of Representatives speaker (2009–2011), HD-7 (2003–2011)
- **Leslie Herod**, HD-8 (2017–present) and former 2023 mayoral candidate
- **Dickey Lee Hullinghorst**, former Colorado House of Representatives speaker (2015–2017), HD-10 (2009–2017)
- **Junie Joseph**, HD-10 (2023–present)
- **Susan Lontine**, HD-1 (2015–2023)
- **Javier Mabrey**, HD-1 (2023–present)
- **Karen Middleton**, HD-42 (2008–2011) and executive director of Cobalt Advocates/NARAL Pro-Choice Colorado (2013–present)
- **David Ortiz**, HD-38 (2021–present)
- **Mike Weissman**, HD-36 (2017–present)

Local officials

- **Aaron Brockett**, mayor of Boulder (2021–present)
- Albus Brooks, former Denver City Council president (2015–2019) from the 9th district (2011–2019)
- **Erin Brown**, Denver Office of Children's Affairs executive director (2014–present)
- **Lisa Flores**, Denver Board of Education member from the 5th district (2015–2019)
- **Al Gardner**, Denver Civil Service Commission member (2022–present) and former 2023 mayoral candidate
- **Gloria Prioleau Neal**, former Denver Department of Public Affairs director (2018–2022)
- **David Olguín**, Denver Latino Board of Commissioners vice chair (2020–present)
- **Theresa Peña**, former at-large Denver Board of Education member (2003–2011)
- **Mary Beth Susman**, former Denver City Council president (2012–2014) from the 5th district (2011–2019)
- **Jordan Sauers**, former Northglenn city councilor from Ward 1 (2015–2019)
- **Mary Seawell**, former at-large (2009–2013) Denver Board of Education president (2011–2013)
- **TommyRay Sena**, Denver Latino Commissioner (2023–present)

Individuals

- **Chauncey Billups**, Portland Trail Blazers head coach (2021–present) and former professional basketball player
- **Lisa Calderón**, executive director of Emerge Colorado and former 2019 and 2023 mayoral candidate
- Reid Hoffman, co-founder and executive chairman of LinkedIn
- **Dottie Lamm**, former first lady of Colorado (1975–1987) (endorsed Herod in first round)
- **Terrance Roberts**, community organizer and former 2023 mayoral candidate
- **James Walsh**, University of Colorado Denver professor and former 2023 mayoral candidate

Organizations

- **Colorado Black Women for Political Action**
- **COLOR Latina**
- **Colorado Sierra Club**
- **Moms Demand Action**

Labor unions

- **AFSCME Council 18** (endorsed Ortega in first round) (Note: AFSCME Council 76 was absorbed by AFSCME Council 18 between endorsements.)
- **Communications Workers of America Local 7750**
- **Denver Area AFL-CIO**
- **SMART Local 9**
- **IATSE Local 7**
- **IBEW Local 68 and 111**
- **International Brotherhood of Teamsters Locals 17 and 455** (endorsed Hansen in first round)
- **LIUNA Local 720**
- **SEIU Local 105**
- **UNITE HERE Local 23** (endorsed Ortega in first round)
- **United Food and Commercial Workers Local 7**

Newspapers

- The Denver Post
Declined to endorse

U.S. representatives

- Diana DeGette, U.S. representative for Colorado's 1st district (1997–present) (Democratic)

State legislators

- Steve Fenberg, Colorado Senate president (2022–present), SD-18 (2017–present) (Democratic)
- Dominick Moreno, Colorado Senate majority leader (2022–present), SD-21 (2017–present) (Democratic)

Local officials

- Michael Hancock, outgoing mayor of Denver (2011–2023) (Democratic)

Individuals

- Andy Rougeot, maintenance executive and former 2023 mayoral candidate (Republican)

=== Polling ===
Poll source	Date(s) administered	Sample size (Note: Key: A – all adults RV – registered voters LV – likely voters V – unclear)	Margin of error	Kelly Brough	Mike Johnston	Undecided
Cygnal (R)	April 11–12, 2023	410 (LV)	± 4.8%	34%	**39%**	27%

=== Results ===
Runoff turnout map by precinct

2023 Denver mayoral election
Candidate	Votes	%
Mike Johnston	**89,889**	**55.15**
Kelly Brough	73,097	44.85
Valid votes	162,986	99.36%
Invalid or blank votes	1,054	0.64
Total votes	**164,040**	**100.00**
Turnout		31.13%
