= 2019 Denver mayoral election =

Mayoral election in Denver, Colorado

- May 7, 2019 (first round); June 4, 2019 (runoff)
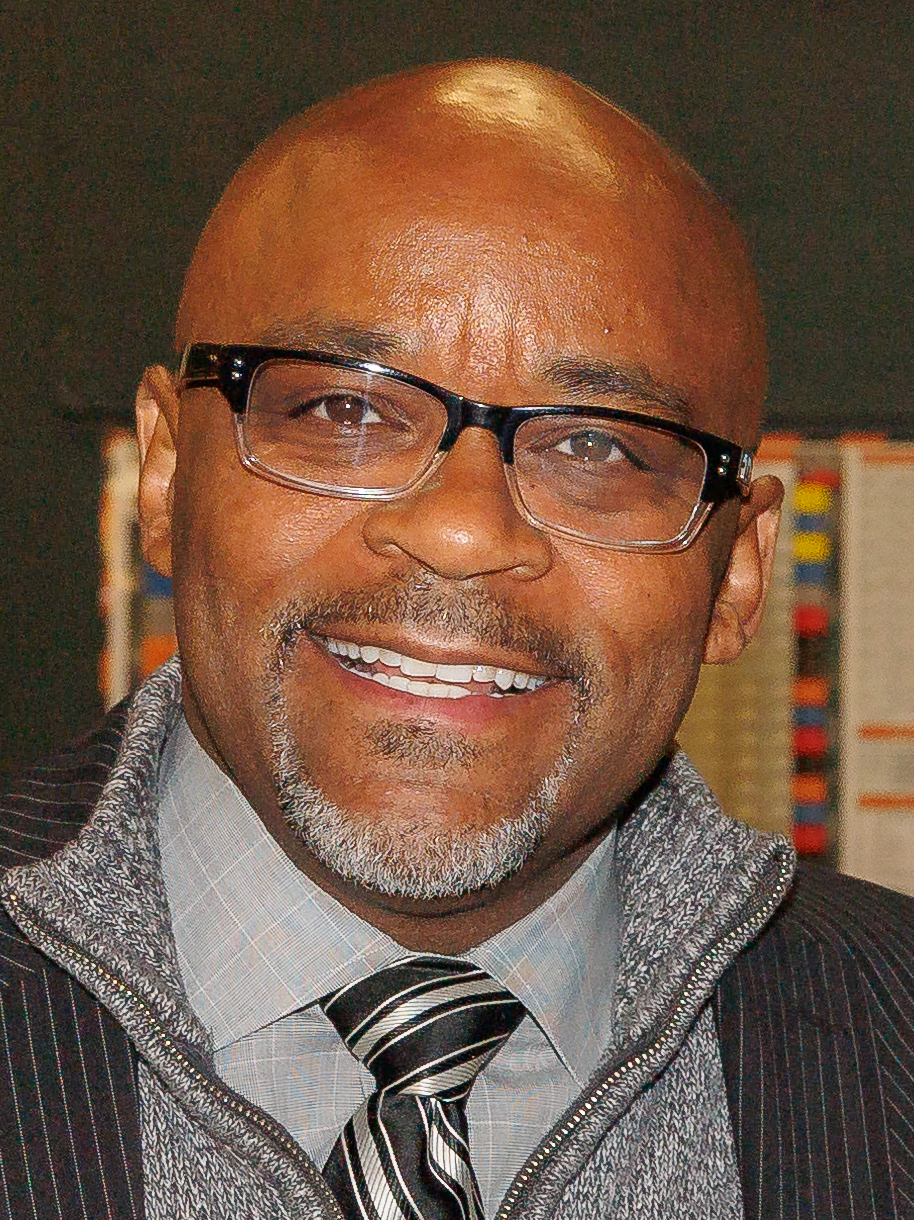

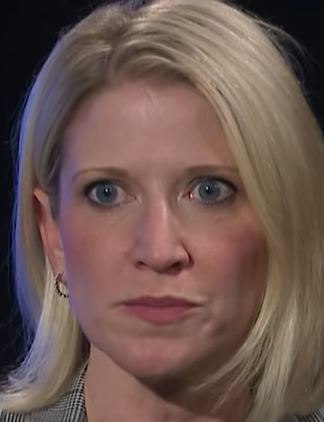

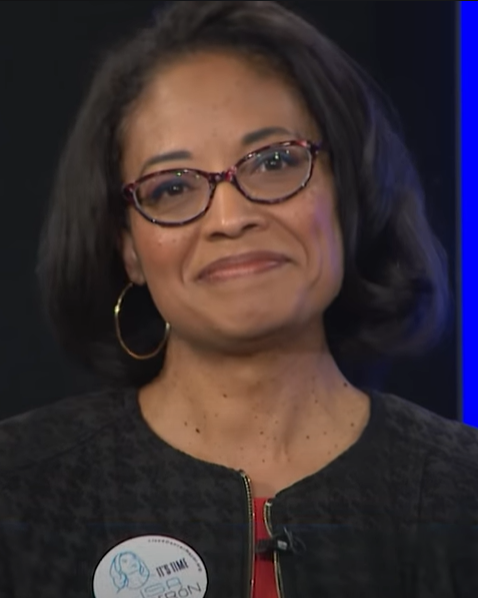

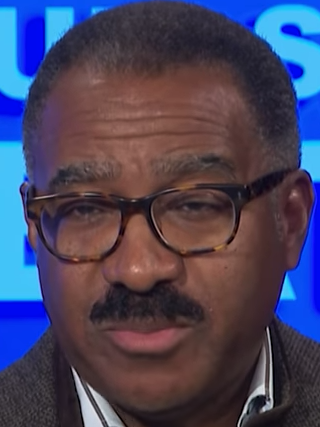
Candidate	Michael Hancock	Jamie Giellis
Party	Nonpartisan	Nonpartisan
First round	68,787 (38.65%)	44,279 (24.88%)
Second round	91,464 (56.32%)	70,945 (43.68%)
Candidate	Lisa Calderón	Penfield Tate III
Party	Nonpartisan	Nonpartisan
First round	32,839 (18.45%)	26,213 (14.73%)
Second round	Eliminated	Eliminated
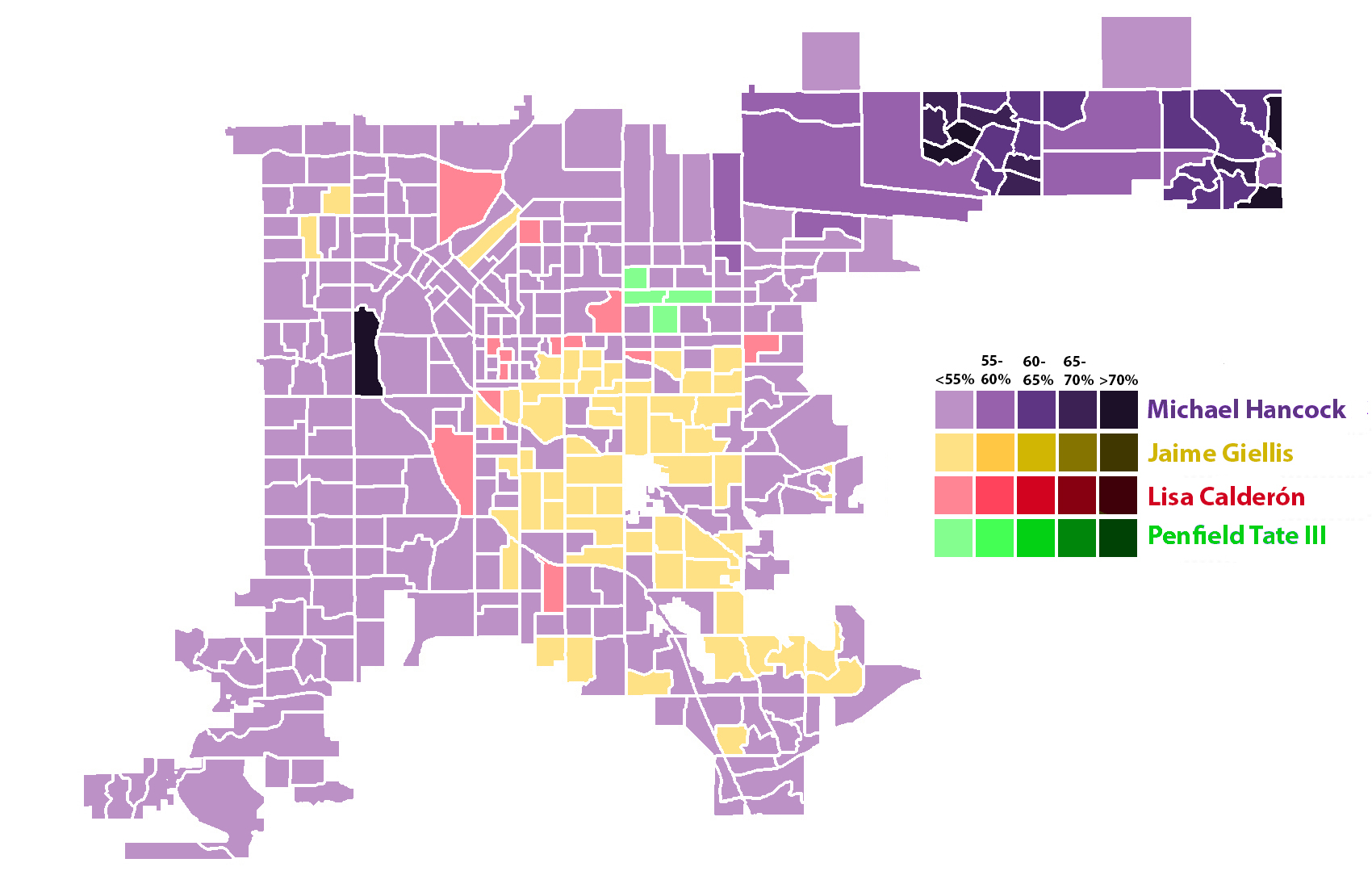
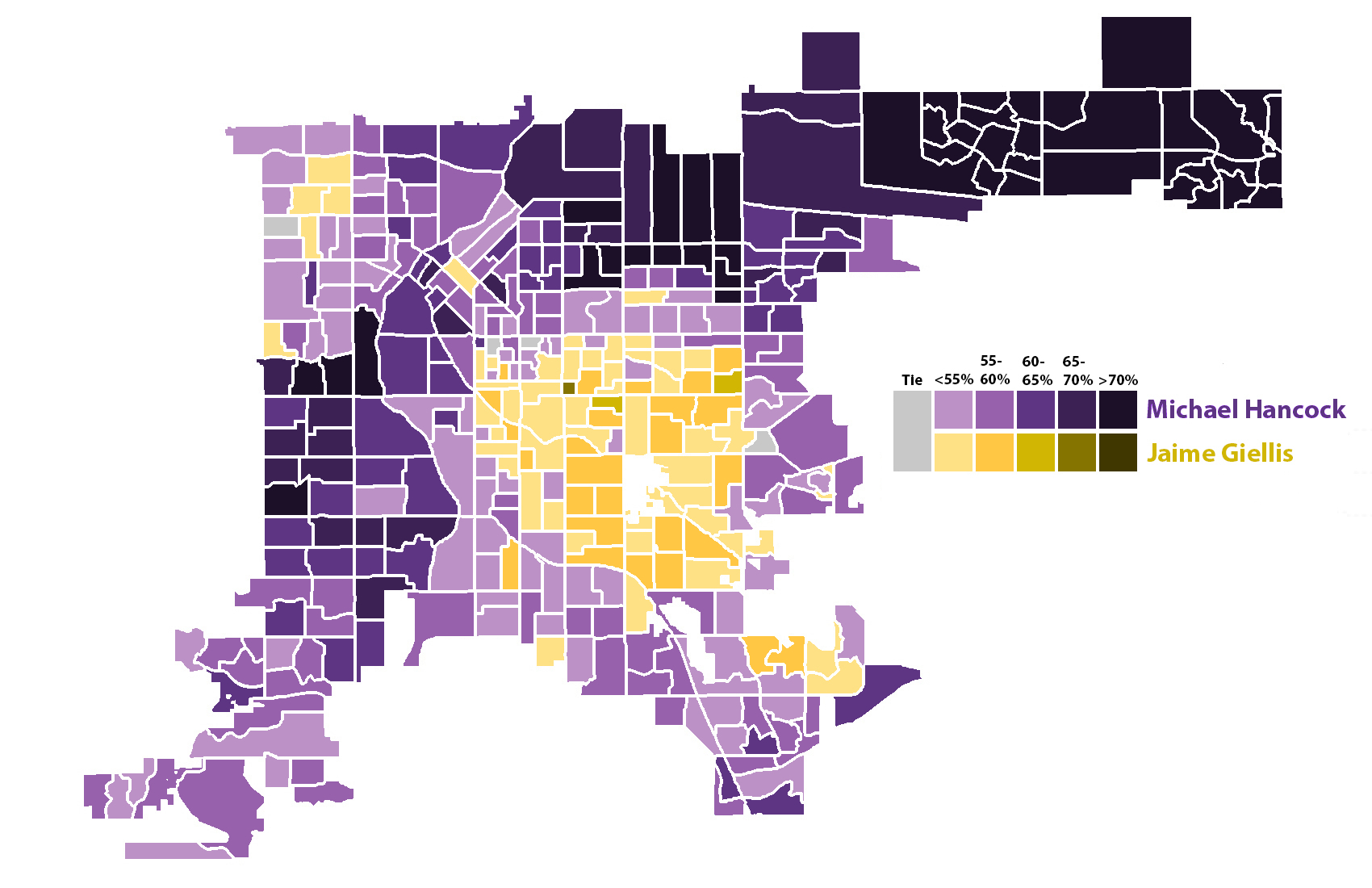
Mayor before election
Michael Hancock
Democratic
Elected mayor
Michael Hancock
Democratic

The 2019 Denver mayoral election was the 2019 edition of the quadrennial elections held to determine the Mayor of the City of Denver, Colorado. The election was held on May 7, 2019. Since no candidate received a majority of votes, a runoff election was held on June 4, 2019, between the two candidates with the most votes, incumbent Mayor Michael Hancock and Jamie Giellis. Hancock defeated Giellis in the runoff election, winning a third term as mayor, and becoming the first mayor to be reelected to a third term since Wellington Webb in 1999. Hancock's third inauguration was held on July 15, 2019.

The election was officially nonpartisan, with its winner being elected to a four-year term. The elections were part of the 2019 Denver elections, which included elections for City Council and city Clerk and Recorder.

== Candidates ==
The filing deadline for the election was April 22, 2019.

=== Declared ===
- Lisa Calderón, professor of criminal justice and sociology at Regis University
- Stephan Evans
- Paul Fiorino, (Write-In)
- Marcus Giavanni, (Write-In) social media consultant, blockchain developer and musician; finished second in the 2015 mayoral election
- Jamie Giellis, consultant and former president of Denver's River North Art District
- Michael Hancock, incumbent mayor of Denver
- Kalyn Heffernan, disability rights activist
- Leatha Scott, (Write-In) maintenance support clerk for United States Postal Service
- Ken Simpson, (Write-In) technology consultant
- Penfield Tate III, former state legislator and candidate for Mayor of Denver in 2003

=== Withdrew ===
- Kayvan Khalatbari, entrepreneur and Indian activist

=== Endorsements ===
Jamie Giellis

State Officials

- Rob Hernandez, former State Senator
- Dafna Michaelson Jenet, State Representative

Local Officials

- Rafael Espinoza, member of the Denver City Council
- Cathy Donohue, former member of the Denver City Council
- Marcia Johnson, former member of Denver City Council
- Dennis Gallagher, former City of Denver Auditor
- Kendra Sandoval, former Director of Community Affairs for the City and County of Denver
Michael Hancock

Federal Officials

- Michael Bennet, U.S. Senator
- Joe Neguse, Member of Congress for Colorado's 2nd congressional district
- Ed Perlmutter, Member of Congress for Colorado's 7th congressional district
- Ken Salazar, former U.S. Senator and Secretary of Interior

State Officials

- John Hickenlooper, former Governor of Colorado
- Bill Ritter, former Governor of Colorado
- Donna Lynne, former Lieutenant Governor of Colorado
- Barbara O'Brien, former Lieutenant Governor of Colorado and current member of Denver Board of Education
- Michael Johnston, former State Senator and 2018 candidate for Governor, candidate for U.S. Senate
- Irene Aguilar, State Senator
- Mike Feeley, former State Senator
- Gloria Travis Tanner, former State Senator
- Terrance Carroll, former Speaker of the Colorado House of Representatives
- Celina Benavidez, former State Representative
- Nolbert Chavez, former State Representative
- Doug Friednash, former State Representative
- Rosemary Marshall, former State Representative
- Jeff Shoemaker, former State Representative

Local Officials

- Bill Vidal, former Mayor of Denver
- Wellington Webb, former Mayor of Denver and former State Representative
- Charlie Brown, former member of Denver City Council
- Elbra Wedgeworth, former member of Denver City Council
- Jennifer Bacon, member of Denver Board of Education
- Bruce Hoyt, former member of Denver Board of Education
- Mike Johnson, former member of Denver Board of Education
- Rosemary Rodriguez, former member of Denver Board of Education

Organizations

- Colorado Black Leadership Coalition
- Colorado Building Construction Trades Council
- Denver Firefighters Local 858
- Greater Metro Denver Ministerial Alliance
- Healthier Colorado
- IATSE Local 7
- Metro Housing Coalition
- Plumbers Local Union 3
- Teamsters Local 17
- UNITE HERE Local 23
- United Association of Denver Pipefitters Local 208
- Vietnamese Community of Colorado
- YIMBY Denver

== Fundraising ==
Campaign finance reports as of May 30, 2019
Candidate	Total money raised
Michael Hancock	$2,747,038.52
Jamie Giellis	$714,367.96
Penfield Tate III	$313,000.11
Marcus Giavanni	$5,533.00
Stephen Evans	$2,345.00
Kalyn Heffernan	$11,628.08
Ken Simpson	N/A
Lisa Calderón	$142,254.84
Danny Lopez	N/A

== Results ==
Denver mayoral election results, 2019
Party	Candidate	Votes	%
Nonpartisan	Michael Hancock (incumbent)	68,787	38.65
Nonpartisan	Jamie Giellis	44,279	24.88
Nonpartisan	Lisa Calderón	32,839	18.45
Nonpartisan	Penfield Tate	26,213	14.73
Nonpartisan	Kalyn Rose Heffernan	4,431	2.49
Nonpartisan	Stephan "Seku" Evans	1,311	0.74
Nonpartisan	Write-ins	115	0.06
Total votes		177,975	100

Denver mayoral runoff election results, 2019
Party	Candidate	Votes	%
Nonpartisan	Michael Hancock (incumbent)	91,464	56.32
Nonpartisan	Jamie Giellis	70,945	43.68
Total votes		162,409	100
