= Candi CdeBaca =

American politician (born 1986)

Member of the Denver City Council from the 9th District
- In office July 15, 2019 – July 17, 2023
- Preceded by: Albus Brooks
- Succeeded by: Darrell Watson

Personal details
- Born: April 10, 1986 (age 40) Elyria-Swansea, Denver
- Party: Democratic
- Other political affiliations: Democratic Socialists of America
- Education: University of Denver
- Website: City Council website Campaign website

Candi Lee CdeBaca (/sideɪˈbɑːkə/ see-day-BA-ka; born April 10, 1986) is a former member of the Denver City Council. She represented District 9 on the council for a single term, serving from July 2019 to July 2023. She is a member of the Democratic Party and the Democratic Socialists of America.

== Life and career ==
CdeBaca was born in Swansea, a neighborhood of Denver between rail lines and Interstate 70. As a teenager, she claims to have returned home one day to find her mother stuck in the street, unable to maneuver her wheelchair over a ramp-less curb. This experience led her to become an activist. In 2006, she co-founded Project VOYCE (Voices of Youth Changing Education), in response to the closure of her school, and helped to organize a class-action lawsuit against Denver Public Schools. CdeBaca was valedictorian and class president at Manual High School, and a first-generation high school graduate. Eventually, she earned bachelor's in Sociology and master's degrees in Social Work simultaneously from the University of Denver, then left for Washington, D.C., to work in education advocacy. She returned to Denver in 2014, and once again became involved in local politics.

== Denver City Council (2019-2023) ==
CdeBaca was branded a communist, for the anti-capitalist remarks she made during a candidate forum on April 7, 2019, advocating for "community ownership of land, labor, resources, and distribution of those resources". In the days afterwards, the video was shared widely on various news sites, and CdeBaca allegedly received death and rape threats. Albus Brooks, the incumbent councilor for the 9th district, was defeated by CdeBaca in a runoff election on June 4, 2019. Ahead of her swearing-in, CdeBaca clarified in an interview that she did not identify as a communist, would have preferred to run unaffiliated, and instead labeled herself an anarchist.

She has faced pushback against a controversial tweet (February 28, 2020), in which she appeared to express support for the idea of spreading coronavirus at a Trump rally. A spokesperson claimed it was a "sarcastic tweet, to call attention to the Trump administration's downplaying of the coronavirus pandemic as a 'hoax' no more dangerous than the common flu".

In 2022, CdeBaca was one of two Denver City Council members who opposed the conversion of an abandoned Denver golf course into a mixed-use development of 2,500 homes (including affordable housing) and commercial space. She said there had been a lack of public consultation over the issue.

In 2022, CdeBaca promoted the idea that a business improvement district, or BID, could be used to enact a race-based tax on White-owned businesses. CdeBaca remarked “Capitalism was built on stolen land, stolen labors, and stolen resources,” and “You could be collecting those extra taxes from White-led business all over the city and redistributing them to black and brown-owned businesses,” CdeBaca said. Tax on White-owned businesses would fund racial reparations to minority-owned businesses.

In the 2023 mayoral and city council elections, CdeBaca ran for re-election but was defeated by opponent Darrell Watson in the runoff election held on June 6.

== Involvement in Colorado Politics ==
CdeBaca's top staffer, Lisa Calderón, ran for Denver mayor in 2019, 2023, and is running in 2027.

== See also ==
- List of Democratic Socialists of America who have held office in the United States
