= Manual High School (Colorado) =

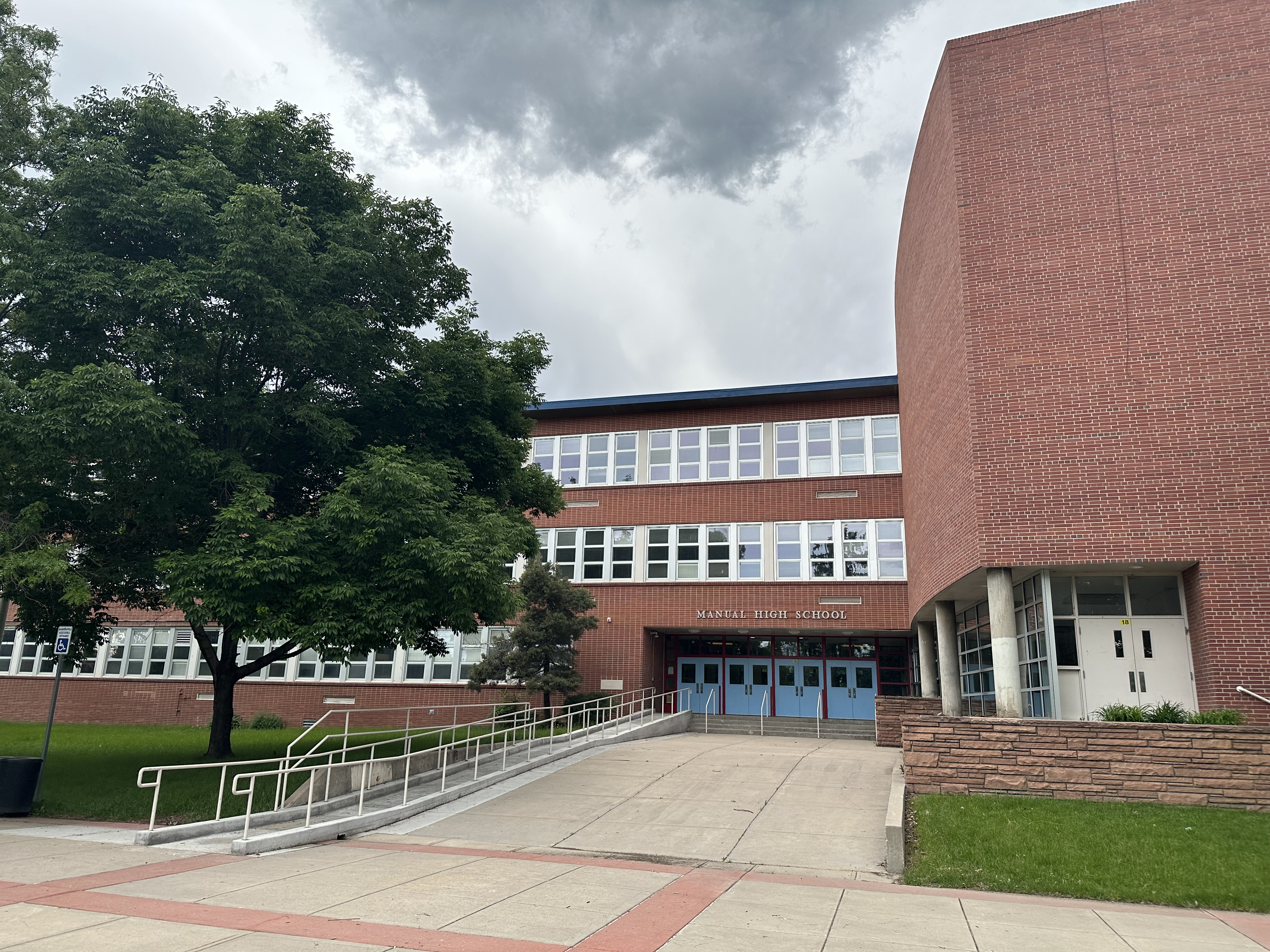
- Manual High School main entrance

Location
- 1700 East 28th Avenue; Denver, Colorado 80205; United States; 39°45′24″N 104°58′3″W

Information
- School type: Public high school
- Motto: Community. Culture. Innovation.
- Established: 1892 (134 years ago)
- School district: Denver 1
- CEEB code: 060420
- NCES School ID: 080336006328
- Principal: Chris DeRemer
- Teaching staff: 22.38 FTE
- Grades: 9–12
- Enrollment: 362 (2023–2024)
- Student to teacher ratio: 16.18
- Colors: Columbia blue and red
- Athletics conference: Colorado High School Activities Association (CHSAA)
- Mascot: Thunderbolts
- Website: manual.dpsk12.org

Manual High School is located in the Whittier neighborhood on the east side of Denver, Colorado, United States.

== History ==
Old East High School was completed in 1889, making it the oldest high school in Denver. It was located on Stout Street between 19th and 20th and was demolished in 1925. Manual High School was also one of the oldest high schools in Denver, opening in 1892. The original building was located near the current one. Manual was also one of the first schools in Denver to educate African Americans. During the 1970s and 1980s, the school had a diverse student body, a result of desegregation busing which began in 1970.

Once a model of educational excellence and community, Manual High School fell on hard times after the school district ended bussing for integration in 1995. Test scores dropped and gang-related violence troubled the school and community. Only 20% of freshman were graduating. For these reasons, the Denver Public Schools (DPS) administrators made drastic changes to Manual. In 2006, after several failed attempts to fix the problems, Manual High School was closed. When the decision was made public, several hundred students from Manual High School rallied outside the headquarters of Denver Public Schools to protest. Students were disappointed and angry because they couldn't finish the school year.

Students shouted, "Hell, no. We won't go" and "Go T-Bolts" (the school's sports moniker) as they marched for about an hour in sub-freezing temperatures outside DPS headquarters at 9th and Grant. Some students suggested that the decision to close Manual was motivated by race. In the end, the displaced students were given the option of attending other higher-performing schools. About 550 students transferred as a result to other Denver schools. The school reopened in the fall of 2007, starting with a freshman class of 150 students for the 2007–08 school year, then adding a class of students every year thereafter. A 2007 article by Katherine Boo in The New Yorker described efforts by then-superintendent of school Michael Bennet to turn Manual back into a high-performance school. By the 2010–11 school year, Manual was once again a 9–12 grade high school. Robert Stein, a Manual graduate (Class of 1977) and top school leader in Colorado, was tapped to lead the new Manual High School in 2007. Leaving his job at the private Graland Country Day School, Stein created a new program for Manual, modeled after high-performing charter schools where students' performance data is scrutinized and students must follow clear guidelines for behavior. This program was a success for the first three years, and helped Manual to post the third-highest growth in test scores in the city and top the district as its highest performed Title I high school. However, after three years, Stein left the school in 2010 due to frustrations with a disagreeing supervisor and bureaucracy issues, especially regarding autonomy and funding.

Joe Sandoval led the school for the 2010–11 school year, until administrators of DPS could find a principal for the school. For the 2011–12 school year, the principal selection committee chose Brian Dale, former principal of Bruce Randolph, to lead the school. Dale was asked to leave Manual High School in 2014, after a dramatic drop in test scores and overspending on the experiential learning program model that was implemented. Don Roy took his place as the interim principal while a new one was selected through an intensive process informed, in part, by the Thought Partner Group, a committee of Manual alumni, community members, parents, and stakeholders. The result of this process was the selection of Nick Dawkins to lead the school starting in the fall of 2015. Dawkins is a native of the community, a DPS graduate, and a high achieving career-DPS educator.

Manual High School graduated its first senior class in 2011 since re-opening. With Manual's graduating class of 2011 the school showed renewed preparation for making students college-bound. Manual High School has made a commitment to leave no T-Bolt behind and to do "whatever it takes to ensure that students stay in school and are prepared for success in college, career and in life." However, by 2014, problems were apparent.

In 2023, Denver's school board gave honorary diplomas to ten former Manual High School students who were unable to graduate after the school closed in 2006.

== Student body ==
- 53.1% Latino
- 40.6% African American
- 5.6% Caucasian
- 0.3% Native American
- 0.3%

In 2014, Manual High School had about 500 students, 60 percent of whom were Latino and 30 percent of whom were African-American.

== Academics ==
Manual High School operates as an Innovation School within Denver Public Schools (DPS), a designation granted under the Colorado Innovation Schools Act of 2008. This status provides the school with increased autonomy regarding its curriculum, budget, and school calendar to better meet the needs of its diverse student body. The school is a member of the Northeast Denver Innovation Zone (NDIZ).

=== Medical Career Pathway ===
A central feature of Manual's academic program is the Medical Career Pathway (often branded as "The Med School at Manual"). This program provides a specialized biomedical science curriculum and clinical experiences for students interested in healthcare professions. Through partnerships with Saint Joseph Hospital and the FACES for the Future program, students engage in "Career Launch" internships and job shadowing. The pathway offers students the opportunity to earn professional industry certifications prior to graduation, including:

- Certified Nursing Assistant (CNA)
- Emergency Medical Technician (EMT)
- Pharmacy Technician
- Certified Patient Care Technician (CPCT)

=== College Readiness and Accelerated Learning ===
Manual emphasizes post-secondary readiness through its Early College model, which utilizes Dual enrollment partnerships with Metropolitan State University of Denver (MSU Denver) and the Community College of Denver. This allows students to take college-level courses for both high school and transferable college credit at no cost to the student.

The school also offers Advanced Placement (AP) courses and incorporates the AVID (Advancement Via Individual Determination) program school-wide. AVID focuses on developing study skills and organizational habits to support students who are frequently the first in their families to attend college.

=== School Performance ===
In the 2024–2025 school year, Manual recorded significant growth in student achievement, earning its highest academic rating in over a decade—a "Yellow" (Improvement Plan) rating on the Colorado School Performance Framework. The school also reported a major increase in student attendance, reaching 84%, and a 95% staff retention rate.

Many academic offerings are available at Manual High School, and concurrent college coursework is also available to some students.

== Athletics ==
Manual High School's athletic teams are known as the Thunderbolts (or T-bolts). The school's crest has two thunderbolts in it.

== Other extracurricular activities ==
A magazine, BOOM!, has been produced at the high school, beginning in 2008, and distributed in the school and in other select locations in the community.

== Notable alumni ==
Listed alphabetically by surname

- Tay Anderson, politician
- Helen Marie Black, first female manager of an American symphony orchestra
- Candi CdeBaca, former member of the Denver City Council
- Walt Conley, folk singer, musician and actor
- Ted Conover, writer
- Rodolfo "Corky" Gonzales, boxer, poet, and activist
- Michael B. Hancock, Mayor of Denver
- Scott Horsley, journalist, National Public Radio correspondent
- Ron Kellum, producer/director, artist and Broadway veteran. Kellum was a contestant on Season 17 of the award-winning television series The Amazing Race.
- Paul Quinichette, jazz musician who played with Count Basie, John Coltrane, and Sarah Vaughan.
- Norman Rice, the first black mayor of Seattle
- Micheal Ray Richardson, basketball player and coach
- Roger Wolcott Toll, mountaineer and former superintendent of Mount Rainier, Rocky Mountains, and Yellowstone National Park
- Wellington Webb, first black Mayor of Denver
