= Seal of Denver =

Seal of the City and County of Denver
- Armiger: Mike Johnston, Mayor of Denver
- Adopted: 1901
- Supporter: None
- Use: Official correspondence, insignia of city agencies and institutions

The Seal of the City and County of Denver, also known as The Seal of Denver or The Denver Corporate Seal, is the official seal of the government of Denver, Colorado, USA.

== Current seal ==
The corporate seal of the City and County of Denver (shown right) was designed by Denver artist Henry Read in 1901. The circular design features an American eagle, reminding us that Denver is a free, American city. The key symbolizes Denver as the key to the Rocky Mountains, and represents the warmth and hospitality extended by Denver citizens to visitors. The capitol dome is included in the seal, as Denver is the capital of the state of Colorado.

== Historic seal ==
The Omaha and Grant Smelter smokestack that were depicted in the seal design was built in 1883, on the east bank of the Platte River. The tall smokestack, built in 1892, was for years the region's tallest structure. It was demolished on February 26, 1950, to clear land for today's Denver Coliseum. Denver's view of the front range of the Rocky Mountains was shown as a background, with the rays of the setting sun lighting the sky.

== See also ==
- Denver, Colorado
- State of Colorado
