= Michael Hancock (American politician) =

45th mayor of Denver

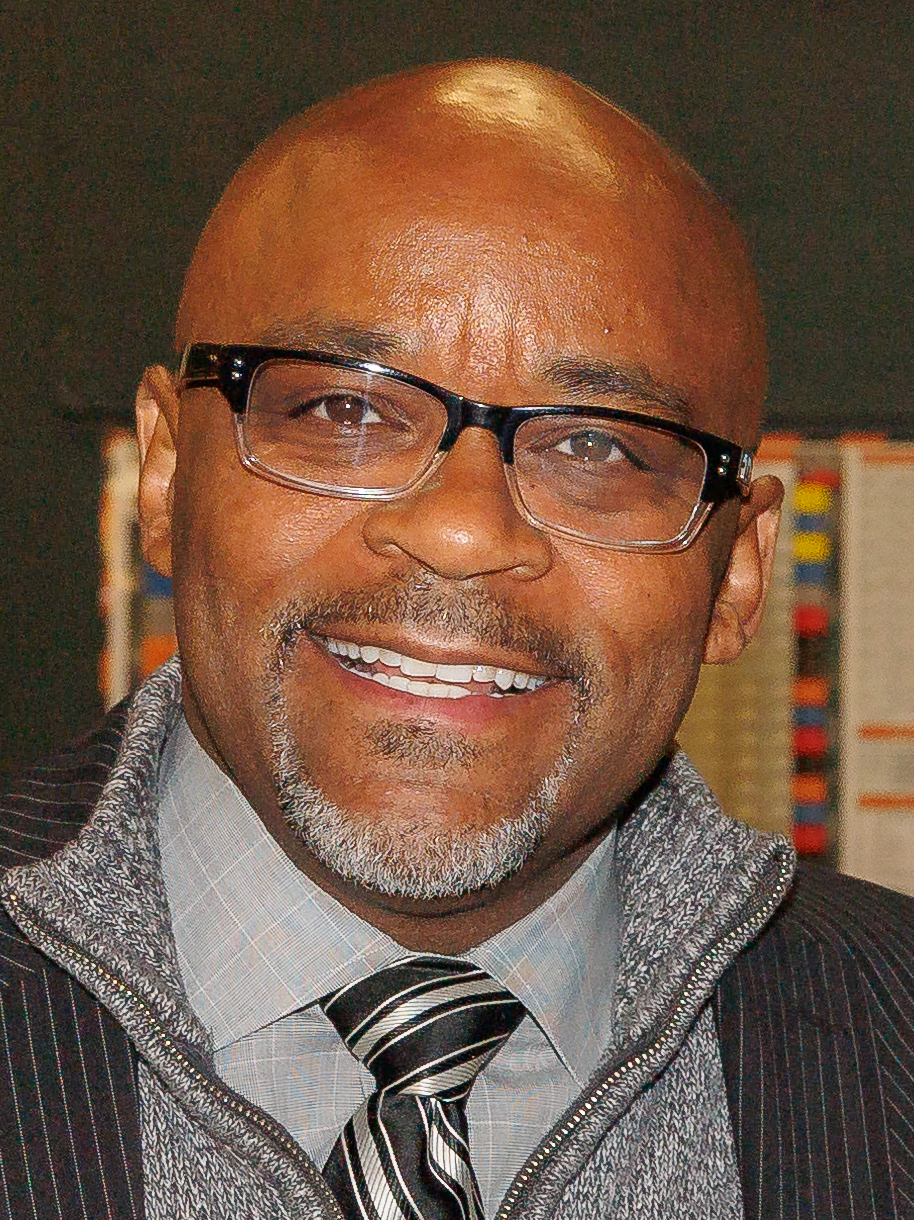
- Hancock in 2022

45th Mayor of Denver
- In office July 18, 2011 – July 17, 2023
- Preceded by: Bill Vidal
- Succeeded by: Mike Johnston

Member of the Denver City Council from the 11th district
- In office July 21, 2003 – July 18, 2011
- Preceded by: Jon Bowman
- Succeeded by: Unknown

Personal details
- Born: July 29, 1969 (age 57) Killeen, Texas, U.S.
- Party: Democratic
- Children: 3
- Education: Hastings College (BA); University of Colorado, Denver (MPA)
- Website: Campaign website

Michael B. Hancock (born July 29, 1969) is an American author and politician who served as the 45th mayor of Denver, Colorado from 2011 to 2023. A member of the Democratic Party, he was in his second term as the Denver City Councilor from the 11th district at the time he was elected to the mayorship.

During his tenure on the Denver City Council from July 20, 2003, to July 18, 2011, Hancock served two terms as the body's president, the last ending in 2008. He was sworn in as Mayor of Denver on July 18, 2011, after defeating Chris Romer in a runoff election on June 7, 2011. Easily reelected with no significant opposition in 2015, Hancock was reelected to a third and final term in 2019. He was Denver's second African American mayor after Wellington Webb.

== Biography ==
Born at Fort Hood in Killeen, Texas, Hancock moved with his family to Denver as an infant. He and his twin sister are the youngest of ten children. According to a DNA analysis performed on his behalf, he descends mainly from enslaved Cameroonians.

During the 1986 Denver Broncos Super Bowl season, while in high school, Hancock performed as the Broncos's mascot "Huddles", making $25 an hour. Hancock graduated from Denver's Manual High School (1987) and earned a bachelor's degree in political science from Hastings College in Nebraska (1991). He also earned a Masters of Arts degree in public administration management from the University of Colorado Denver.

Hancock and former Colorado State Senator Peter Groff co-wrote the book Standing in the Gap: Leadership for the 21st Century, published in 2004. On May 8, 2012, Hancock visited the city of Reykjavík and met the Mayor of Reykjavík, Jón Gnarr, in Höfði. Hancock was named a 2014 Aspen Institute Rodel Fellow.

Hancock is married to actress and vocalist Mary Louise Lee. They have three children. In April 2021 the couple announced their separation and that they will file for divorce. Hancock serves as a deacon at the New Hope Baptist Church.

== Professional life ==
Hancock started his career in the early 1990s, holding down two jobs at the Denver Housing Authority and the National Civic League — while also pursuing a master's degree.

At the Housing Authority, he designed, implemented, and oversaw the first-ever athletic, cultural and leadership-training programs for 11,000 inner-city kids living in public housing. Hancock also helped write a state law outlawing drug possession within 100 feet of public housing.

With the National Civic League, Hancock helped communities, nonprofits, and other clients all over the country craft and enact strategic plans to solve economic and budget challenges, increase civic participation and improve governance.

He joined the Metro Denver's Urban League affiliate in 1995 as program director at a time when the economic-empowerment and civil rights organization was struggling — struggling so much that his first paycheck bounced. Undaunted, Hancock rose through the ranks, developing a strategic plan, overseeing day-to-day operations and leading fundraising efforts. He became Executive Vice President, interim President, and then President in 1999.

At 29 years old, Hancock was the youngest leader of an Urban League chapter anywhere in the United States. He developed a talented staff, created a nationally recognized and award-winning job training program, and built private sector partnerships with companies like Qwest, Comcast, and AT&T.

== Denver City Council ==
After almost five years as President of Metro Denver Urban League, Hancock stepped down in 2003 when voters in northeast Denver's 11th district elected him to the Denver City Council. He was reelected in 2007. His council peers unanimously chose him to serve two terms as President of the Denver City Council from 2006 to 2008. He presided over the creation of the Denver Pre-School Initiative, strategies to fight foreclosures, as well as the implementation of the largest infrastructure improvement in Denver history.

While on the Denver City Council, Hancock was a leader on neighborhood issues, citywide finances, economic development and children's issues.

== Mayor of Denver ==
Mayor John Hickenlooper was elected governor of Colorado in the 2010 election. In the May 3, 2011, first primary for Denver mayor, Hancock was among the final two finishers against State Senator Chris Romer. Romer led the first round with 31,901 votes (28.49%) to Hancock's 30,314 votes (27.04%). Hancock went on to defeat Romer in the June 7, 2011 Runoff election in a landslide with 70,780 votes (58.08%) to Romer's 51,082 votes (41.92%). Hancock was inaugurated as the 45th Mayor of Denver on July 18, 2011.

Hancock was reelected on May 5, 2015, in a landslide victory with 75,774 votes (80.16%) against Marcus Giavanni, who pulled a second place win with 8,033 votes (8.50%). There were no mayoral debates in 2015. Hancock was inaugurated on July 20, 2015, at the Ellie Caulkins Opera House. In May 2018, it was reported Hancock was outraised by entrepreneur Kayvan Khalatbari for his upcoming reelection bid in the first reporting quarter of the year.

In June 2019, Hancock was nevertheless reelected with 56.3% of the vote in a runoff from the May 2019 general election in which Hancock and Jamie Giellis were the top two finishers. Giellis received 43.7% of the votes in the June 4 runoff.

In 2020, Hancock came out in favor of reparations for slavery in the United States. He created a Black Reparations Fund at the Denver Foundation, which collects donations to be eventually distributed to the city's Black residents. In June 2021, Hancock was one of 11 U.S. mayors who formed Mayors Organized for Reparations and Equity (MORE), a coalition of municipal leaders dedicated to starting pilot reparations programs in their cities. Hancock is co-chair of MORE, along with Los Angeles mayor Eric Garcetti.

In April 2022, on behalf of the city of Denver, Hancock formally apologized for the anti-Chinese race riots that occurred in 1880. He gifted the descendants of the victims a commemorative token and a signed apology letter. The apology letter stated that the city of Denver would build an Asian Pacific District, partner with the education system to have a program on Asian Pacific Coloradans, and an Asian Pacific American Community Museum.

== Controversies ==
In 2012, political activists Occupy Denver opposed legislation Mayor Hancock signed banning unauthorized camping; critics said it criminalized homelessness. Hancock has also drawn international attention for his oppositional positions towards the city's homeless residents, including threats from Anonymous in 2016 to expose alleged ties to an escort service.

In 2016, following a speech on poverty and hope through low-income housing, his police force cracked down on the residents, which Denver Homeless Out Loud livestreamed officials partaking in sweeps.

The ACLU of Colorado issued oppositional statements toward the mayor's office for the misuse of appropriations designed to help the homeless, instead used to evict them. As winter approached, the police force was condemned by the organization for confiscating the bedding materials of the residents.

=== Housing controversy ===
In 2018, it was reported the city's affordable housing program permitted overqualified purchasers, resulting in the loss of compliance for the program from the Land Title Association of Colorado.

=== Sexual harassment case ===
Hancock admitted to sending suggestive text messages to his female subordinate, Leslie Branch-Wise, during his first year as mayor. He acknowledged his behavior as "inappropriate" when the victim, a Denver Police Department Detective, gave an interview in 2018 to disclose the sexual harassment she experienced. By providing several suggestive text messages from Hancock, the detective provided a glimpse into the suffering she encountered during the time she worked for Hancock's security detail in 2012. Following the Detective's interview, Hancock issued a blanket public apology to the victim, his family and the people of Denver. Hancock explained, "I made a mistake. I'm human. I never purport to be perfect." He called the circumstances "wrought with politics" and concluded: "It was just one of those things where I got too casual and too familiar, and I learned a lesson from that." The city paid the officer $75,000 as part of a settlement.

=== Son's body camera video with police ===
On March 23, 2018, Mayor Hancock's 22-year-old son, Jordan Hancock, was pulled over by Aurora Police for going 65 mph in a 40 mph zone. In August, body camera footage was released of the incident; in the video, he can be seen and heard berating the Aurora Police officer who pulled him over. He uttered homophobic slurs, cursed at the officer, insulted the officer and threatened his job. The officer remained calm and courteous and issued him the citation. It was revealed that Jordan Hancock was ordered to pay a $275 fine for his speeding that day and Mayor Hancock has claimed that his son would apologize to the officer in person one day if given the opportunity.

=== Other decisions ===
In February 2020, Mayor Hancock's first veto in his three terms of office was to strike down the repeal of the three-decades old pit bull breed ban in Denver.

In November 2020, Hancock told his constituents to stay home and stay safe from COVID-19 during Thanksgiving in 2020; however, he ignored his own advice and was caught flying on a commercial flight to Mississippi to visit family.

== Honours ==
- Order of the Rising Sun, 3rd Class, Gold Rays with Neck Ribbon (2026)

== See also ==
- List of mayors of the 50 largest cities in the United States

Political offices
Preceded by Bill Vidal	Mayor of Denver; 2011–2023	Succeeded by Mike Johnston
