= Scott Horsley =

American radio journalist

Scott Horsley is an American radio journalist. He is the Chief Economics Correspondent for National Public Radio.

== Early life, family and education ==
Horsley was raised in Denver, Colorado, graduating from its Manual High School. He earned a bachelor's degree at Harvard University, then an MBA at San Diego State University.

== Career ==
Horsley began his career in 1987 as a production assistant, cutting tape overnight for NPR's Morning Edition news radio program. He worked at public radio stations KPBS-FM in San Diego, California, covering business and economic issues; and at WUSF in Tampa, Florida, WKXL in Concord, New Hampshire as well as another commercial radio station in Boston, Massachusetts, and Concord, New Hampshire.

Horsley joined National Public Radio in 2001. He covered presidential campaigns of John Kerry, John McCain and Mitt Romney. Moving back to Washington, DC, he covered the White House for NPR during the US Presidencies of Barack Obama and Donald Trump.

== Honors and awards ==
- Public Radio News Directors' Award

== Personal life ==
Horsley resides in Washington, D.C. As of 2019, he had a dog, Rosie.
