= Tay Anderson =

American politician

Auon’tai Anderson

Director of the Denver Public Schools Board of Education
- In office December 4, 2019 – November 28, 2023

Personal details
- Born: July 5, 1998 (age 26); Kansas City, Kansas, U.S.
- Political party: Democratic

Auon'tai M. Anderson (born July 5, 1998) is an American politician and community organizer from Denver, Colorado. A member of the Democratic Party, he served as a director of the Denver Public Schools Board of Education from 2019 to 2023. In September 2021, he was censured by the board for "behavior unbecoming of a board member" following an investigation of allegations against him. Anderson was not charged as the original claims made against him were found to be unsubstantiated and the individual that was responsible for these allegations was deemed not be credible per investigators. Anderson was subsequently elected the Vice President of the Board of Education and elected the statewide President of the Colorado Black Caucus of School Board Members. After Anderson's term he became an educator in Denver Public Schools.

== Early life and education ==
Anderson was born to Mia Anderson, a single mother who was a teenager when he was born. He grew up in Kansas City, Kansas, and moved to Denver to attend high school. He attended two other schools before settling on Manual High School, where he later became student body president. While at Manual, he decided to run to become a director of the Denver Public Schools Board of Education. At the time he was 19 years old, thus becoming the second youngest person to date to run for a Denver school board. (In 1977, Meyer Persow, ne Kadovitz, was 18 years old when he ran for the Denver School Board, finishing 11th out of 18 candidates).

Anderson lost that election, and instead enrolled at Metropolitan State University of Denver to study education and also began working in restorative justice within Denver Public Schools. He decided to run for the Board of Education again in 2019, campaigning on supporting low-performance schools, putting a pause on approving new charter schools, and reforming how punishment was conducted at schools. Anderson decisively won this election, and doing so ushered in Denver's first anti-reform, pro-union school board in over a decade. In a three-way race, he won about 51% of the total vote. He is one of the youngest elected officials in Colorado history, being just 21 at the time of his inauguration.

== Early career ==
Anderson graduated from Manual High School in 2017. His professional experience includes working as a restorative practice coordinator at Denver North High School. He is affiliated with March for Our Lives - Colorado.

== Political career ==
Anderson was inaugurated into the Denver School Board on December 4, 2019. The following January, Anderson helped pass a mandate requiring all Denver Public Schools to designate a gender-neutral bathroom, saying it would support the LGBT community. Additionally, Anderson has led an effort to remove the Denver Police Department from public schools within the city. Anderson was a de facto leader of Denver's George Floyd protests.

=== State House candidacy ===
On June 12, 2023, Anderson announced he was abandoning his Denver school board re-election campaign and would instead seek the 8th district seat in the 2024 Colorado House of Representatives election. The seat is currently held by Leslie Herod, who is term limited. Later, on January 9, 2024, Anderson announced he was withdrawing from the race, fearing that the number of black candidates in the race would divide the black vote and allow a non-black candidate to win.

== Allegations of sexual assault ==
On March 26, 2021, Denver's Black Lives Matter affiliate, Black Lives Matter 5280, issued a statement saying a woman approached the organization in the previous month and reported that Anderson sexually assaulted her. The woman's name was not revealed in the statement, but she requested a public apology from Anderson and asked that he "seek help from a licensed professional with relevant expertise." Anderson issued a statement a day later denying the allegations. BLM5280 said Anderson "will not be welcome to share space with BLM5280 physically or on any of our platforms." After it released its initial statement, BLM5280 said "multiple" additional alleged victims had approached the organization to report that Anderson sexually assaulted them too. Anderson again denied wrongdoing, but told Westword magazine that "although I would have never intended for anyone to feel unsafe or uncomfortable around myself or others, I deeply apologize to the women-identifying members of NAC for the impact of my actions."

On May 28, 2021, Denver Public Schools acknowledged that their board and the Denver Police Department were aware of new allegations of sexual assault against Anderson. Testimony before the Colorado State House Judiciary Committee on May 25 alleged the existence of a serial sexual predator within the school district, without naming Anderson specifically. Shortly thereafter police and the school district indicated they had been informed that the accusations were against Anderson specifically.

After a third-party investigation was conducted, it was found that Fleming "had inconsistencies in her story, used inappropriate humor, and timed her report for Sexual Assault Awareness Month", leading the investigation to state the sexual assault allegations were unsubstantiated and "objectively implausible." Fleming refused to talk with the investigators, and nobody came forward to corroborate her allegations. The investigation also found "behavior unbecoming of a board member" which included "online flirtations with a 16-year-old student and coercive social media posts." Over 1000 students walked out of classrooms in protest of Anderson remaining on the board. The Denver school board voted 6–1 to censure Anderson for his behavior. Anderson was the sole vote in opposition to the measure, which was the first time the board had censured one of its own members.

Anderson later pursued a defamation lawsuit (2021CV33673) against BLM5280, Fleming, and another political activist related to their public statements. In 2022, a Denver District Court judge dismissed the lawsuit, ruling that BLM 5280 "did not act with malice or reckless disregard for the truth." Following the dismissal of the case, the defendants filed for reimbursement of their legal fees under Colorado's Anti-SLAPP law. The judge agreed, and Anderson was ordered to pay $61,060 to BLM 5280 and Amy Brown.
