= Bruce Randolph School =

Public high school in Colorado, US

Location
- 3955 Steele Street; Commerce City, Colorado 80205; United States
- Coordinates: 39°46′19″N 104°57′3″W

Information
- School type: Public high school
- Motto: Redefining What's Possible
- Established: 2002; 24 years ago
- School district: Denver 1
- CEEB code: 060374
- NCES School ID: 080336001869
- Principal: Erin Olson
- Teaching staff: 47.56 (on an FTE basis)
- Grades: 6–12
- Gender: Coeducational
- Enrollment: 653 (2023–24)
- Student to teacher ratio: 13.73
- Campus type: City, Large
- Colors: Red, silver, and white
- Athletics conference: City League
- Mascot: Grizzly
- Website: brucerandolph.dpsk12.org

Bruce Randolph School is a public school in Denver, Colorado, United States. It serves grades six through twelve.

Part of Denver Public Schools, Bruce Randolph began to operate autonomously in 2007 in a bid to turn around its dismal graduation rates, which was successful. As part as the changes, each teacher had to reapply for their job, after which only six of forty remained. Its turnaround in student graduation rates between 2006 and 2010 was praised by US President Barack Obama during his 2011 State of the Union Address.
