= Mike Johnston (Colorado politician) =

Mayor of Denver since 2023

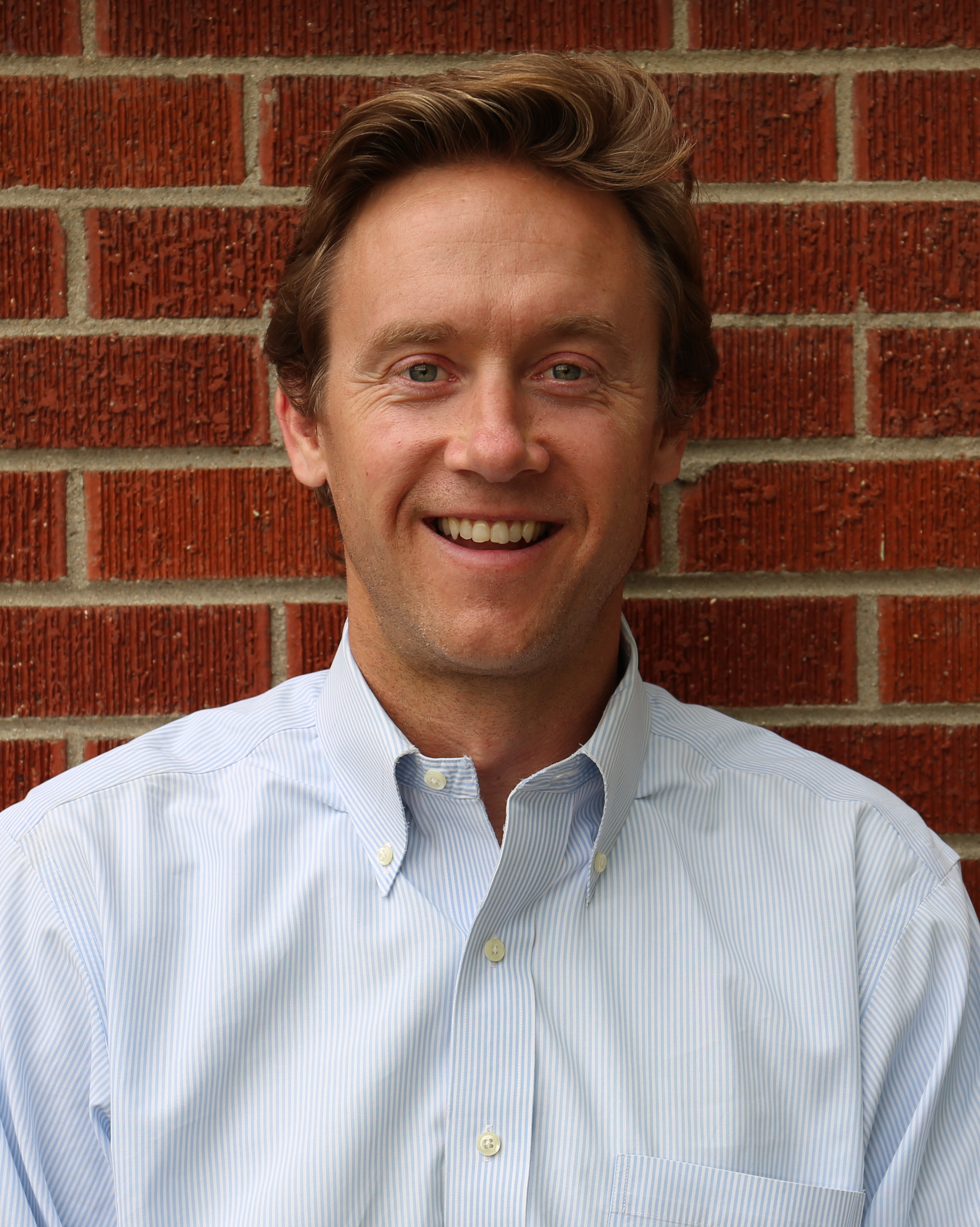
- Johnston in 2017

46th Mayor of Denver
- Incumbent
- Assumed office July 17, 2023
- Preceded by: Michael Hancock

Member of the Colorado Senate from the 33rd district
- In office May 29, 2009 – January 11, 2017
- Preceded by: Peter Groff
- Succeeded by: Angela Williams

Personal details
- Born: Michael Christopher Johnston; November 17, 1974 (age 51) Oklahoma City, Oklahoma, U.S.
- Party: Democratic
- Spouse: Courtney Johnston (m. 2004)
- Children: 3
- Education: Yale University (BA, JD); Harvard University (MEd)

Michael Christopher Johnston (born November 17, 1974) is an American educator and politician serving as the 46th and current mayor of Denver, Colorado. A member of the Democratic Party, he won the 2023 Denver mayoral election by defeating Kelly Brough in the June 6 runoff election.

Johnston first entered politics when he served in the Colorado Senate, representing the 33rd district from 2009 to 2017. He was a candidate for governor of Colorado in 2018, losing in the primary to Jared Polis, who went on to win the general election. He was also a candidate for the U.S. Senate in 2020, before withdrawing from the race in September 2019.

== Early life and education ==
One of four children, Johnston was born in Oklahoma City on November 17, 1974, and raised in Vail, Colorado, the son of Sarah "Sally" (née Cox) and Paul Ross Johnston. His father was a U.S. Army veteran and businessman who served on the town council for more than a decade and then as mayor from 1983 to 1987.

After graduating from Vail Mountain School in 1993, Johnston attended Yale College, earning his bachelor's degree in English in 1997. During high school and college, he was involved in community service activities, including volunteering at a Denver homeless shelter and mentoring youth in a New Haven housing project. After graduating from college, he taught English at Greenville High School in rural Mississippi for two years as part of the Teach For America program. Based on this experience, he wrote the book In the Deep Heart's Core.

After his program ended, Johnston enrolled in the Harvard Graduate School of Education, earning a master's degree in education policy. While at Harvard, he worked with Al Gore's education advisor, Jon Schnur. With Schnur and others, he helped to found New Leaders for New Schools, an organization dedicated to training and recruiting leaders for urban schools. Upon earning his master's degree, he enrolled in Yale Law School, and became an education policy advisor to political candidates, including U.S. Senate candidate Tom Strickland in 2002.

== Professional career ==
After returning to Colorado in 2003, he was hired as principal at Joan Farley Academy. In 2004, he served as principal of the Marvin Foote Detention Center, which houses students in detention centers held in state custody, and organized the first high school graduation in the center's history. In 2005, Johnston taught education law at the University of Denver Law School and became the founding principal of Mapleton Expeditionary School of the Arts (MESA), a public school in Thornton, Colorado. As the school's principal, he helped to develop the school's curriculum and program as the school district shifted to developing smaller schools.

In the aftermath of Hurricane Katrina, Johnston helped lead an education summit in New Orleans and worked with U.S. Congressman George Miller on legislation to recruit and retain teachers. He joined Senator Barack Obama's presidential campaign as an informal advisor early in 2007; by May 2008, he was regarded as one of the campaign's key advisors on education issues. Obama delivered a major address on education from MESA in May 2008. The school's achievements were highlighted in an October 2008 campaign advertisement.

Johnston has served on the boards of local and national education and service organizations, including the I Have A Dream Foundation, the Urban League, City Year, New Leaders, America Achieves, and America Succeeds. In 2010, he was featured in Forbes magazine's "7 Most Powerful Educators" and Time magazine's "40 Under 40".

Johnston served as the chief executive officer of Gary Community Ventures during the COVID-19 pandemic. Under his leadership, the nonprofit organization delivered almost two million test kits and helped coordinate thousands of vaccinations across Colorado.

== Early political career ==
=== Colorado Senate ===
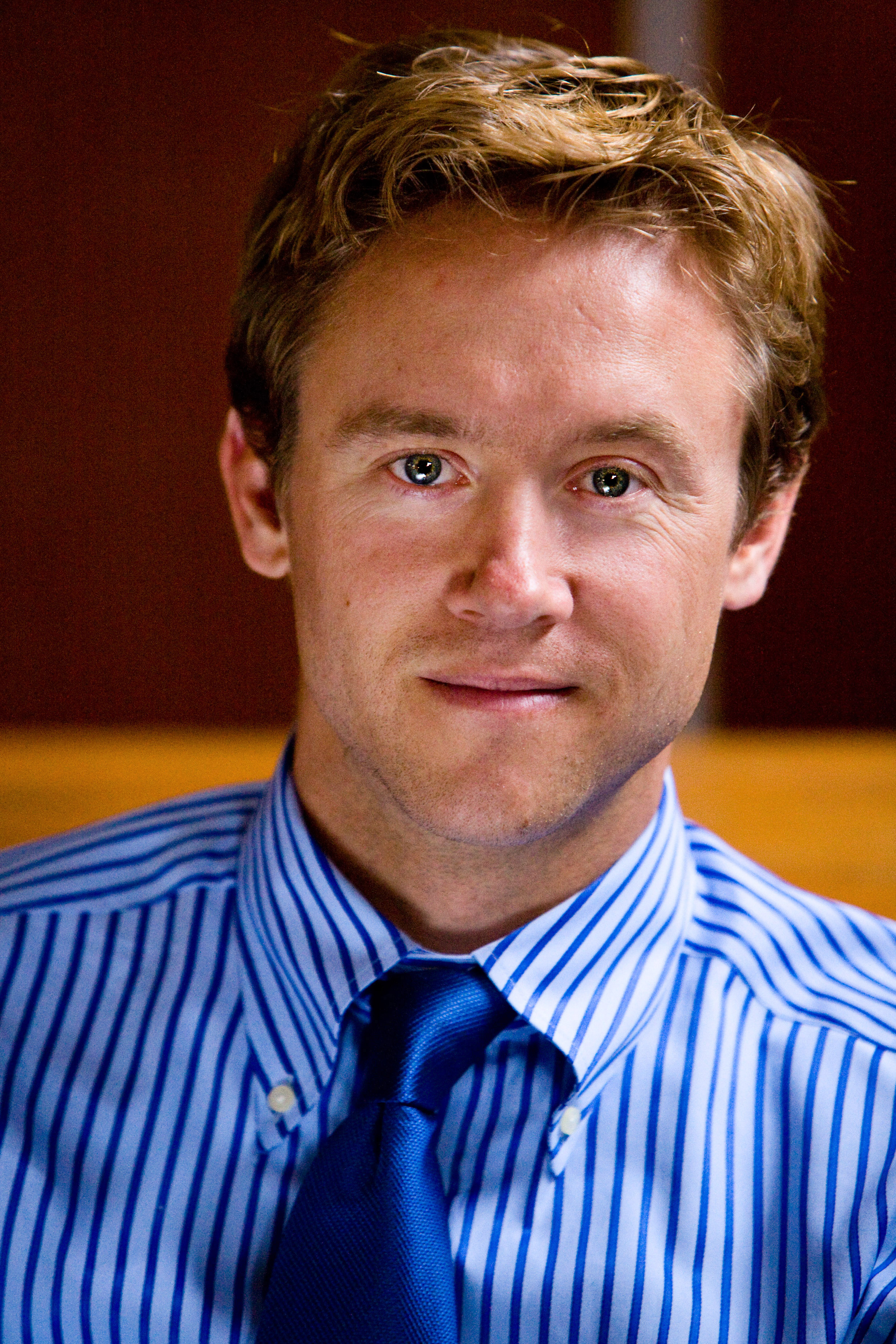
Johnston in 2009

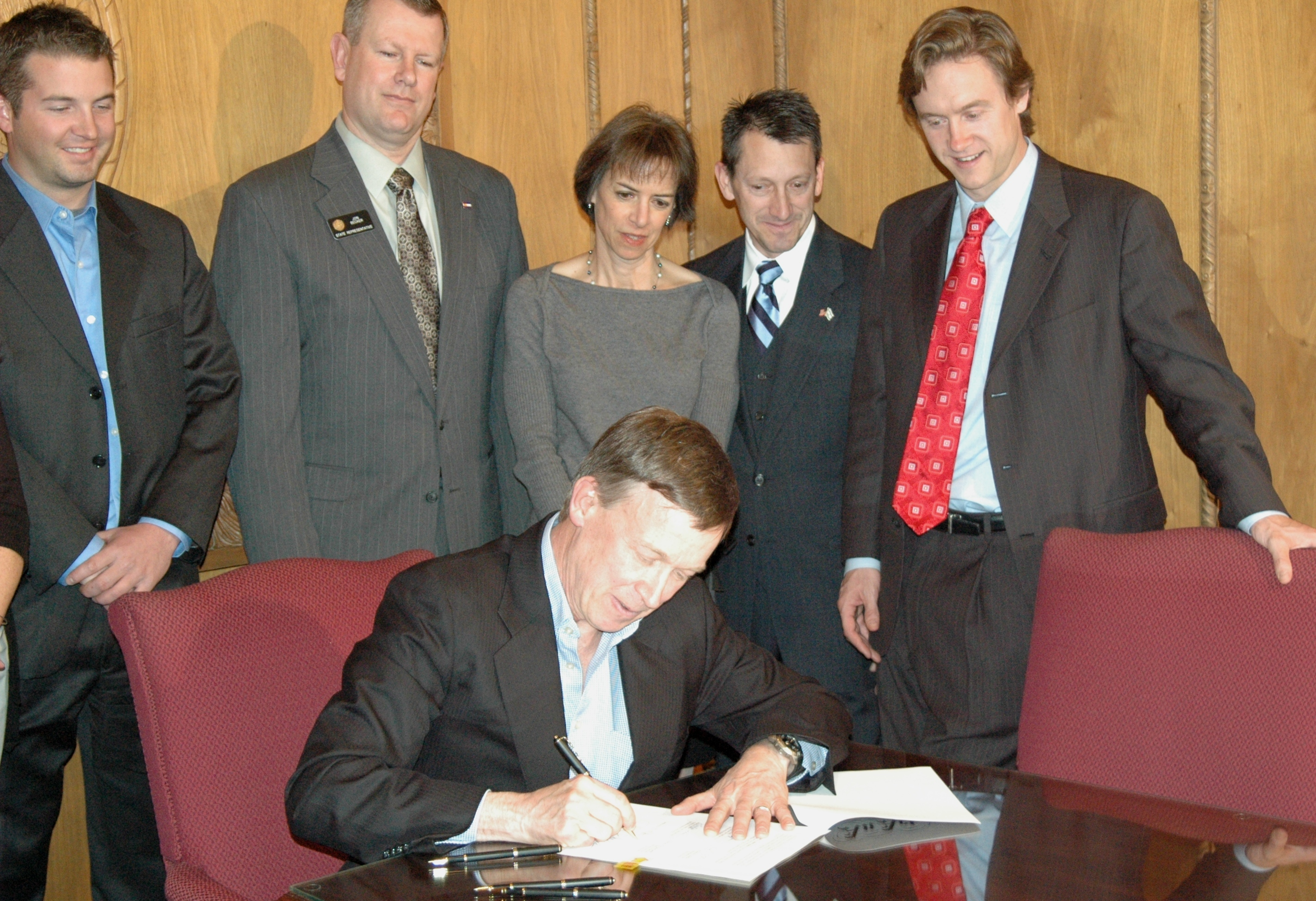
Johnston (right) watches as Governor John Hickenlooper signs HB-1262 in 2011

==== Elections ====
In April 2009, Johnston declared his candidacy for Colorado's 33rd Senate district, a historically African-American legislative seat based in northeastern Denver, after incumbent Peter Groff announced his resignation upon accepting an appointment in the Obama administration's Department of Education. Johnston cited education as the central motivation for his run, including the failure of a bill during the 2008 session granting in-state tuition to undocumented immigrants. During his campaign for the legislative appointment, he met personally with almost all members of the vacancy committee.

At the May 11 vacancy committee meeting, Johnston received 64 out of 126 votes in the first round of balloting to win the appointment, defeating former state representative Rosemary Marshall, Democratic National Committee member Anthony Graves, and activist Renee Blanchard. He was sworn into office on May 29, 2009. He was later elected in 2010 to complete the rest of Groff's term and was then re-elected in 2012, each time winning more than 82% of the vote. Due to the term limit, this was his last term in the state Senate.

==== Service ====
While serving in the Senate, Johnston was assigned to the education and finance committees. He supported SB 10–191, legislation that modified teacher and principal accountability by measuring performance in part by student academic growth. The bill was signed into law by Governor Bill Ritter in May 2010. Senate bill 191 was poorly received among teachers. Denver Post guest columnist and teacher Brian Kurz espoused the need to repeal the law as it was an unfunded burden on school districts. Efforts to repeal the law were unsuccessful and it remains in effect to this day.

Johnston worked on passing the READ Act, which was signed into law in May 2012. The law provides districts resources to help K-3 students struggling to read by establishing a process for districts to identify K-3 students who read below grade level and work with their parents to provide extra reading support before students reach the fourth grade. The bill also created the Early Literacy Grant Program to provide funding to districts for literacy assessments, professional development, instructional support, and appropriate interventions, and would distribute approximately $16 million to districts for use in one of three literacy support programs: full day kindergarten, tutoring services, or summer school.

Johnston was a co-sponsor of the ASSET bill, which allows students not legally entitled to be in the United States to pay in-state tuition at Colorado colleges and universities if they attend a Colorado high school for three years and graduate or earn a GED. Under previous law, students not legally entitled to be in the United States, who had graduated from Colorado high schools and had benefited from the state's investment in K-12 education were forced to pay out-of-state tuition. After languishing in the legislature for almost a decade, the bill passed and was signed into law by Governor John Hickenlooper in April 2013. "We come here today to close a chapter in American history, and to open a new one," Johnston remarked. "For me personally, there's no more significant bill that I've worked on that's going to make an actual impact on human beings."

=== Statewide campaigns ===
Shortly after leaving the state senate, Johnston ran for governor of Colorado in 2018 to succeed John Hickenlooper, who was term-limited. Congressman Jared Polis won the Democratic primary election with former state treasurer Cary Kennedy finishing in second place and Johnston in a close third place. After the primary, he endorsed Polis as the Democratic nominee. Polis defeated Republican Walker Stapleton in the general election.

In January 2019, Johnston entered the 2020 U.S. Senate election for the seat held by Republican Cory Gardner. Johnston withdrew his candidacy in September 2019, a few weeks after former governor John Hickenlooper entered the race. Despite good fundraising numbers early in his campaign, Johnston cited the need for Democrats to avoid negative campaigning in the primary election as more important. Hickenlooper later won the Democratic nomination and defeated Gardner in the general election.

== Mayor of Denver ==
=== 2023 election ===
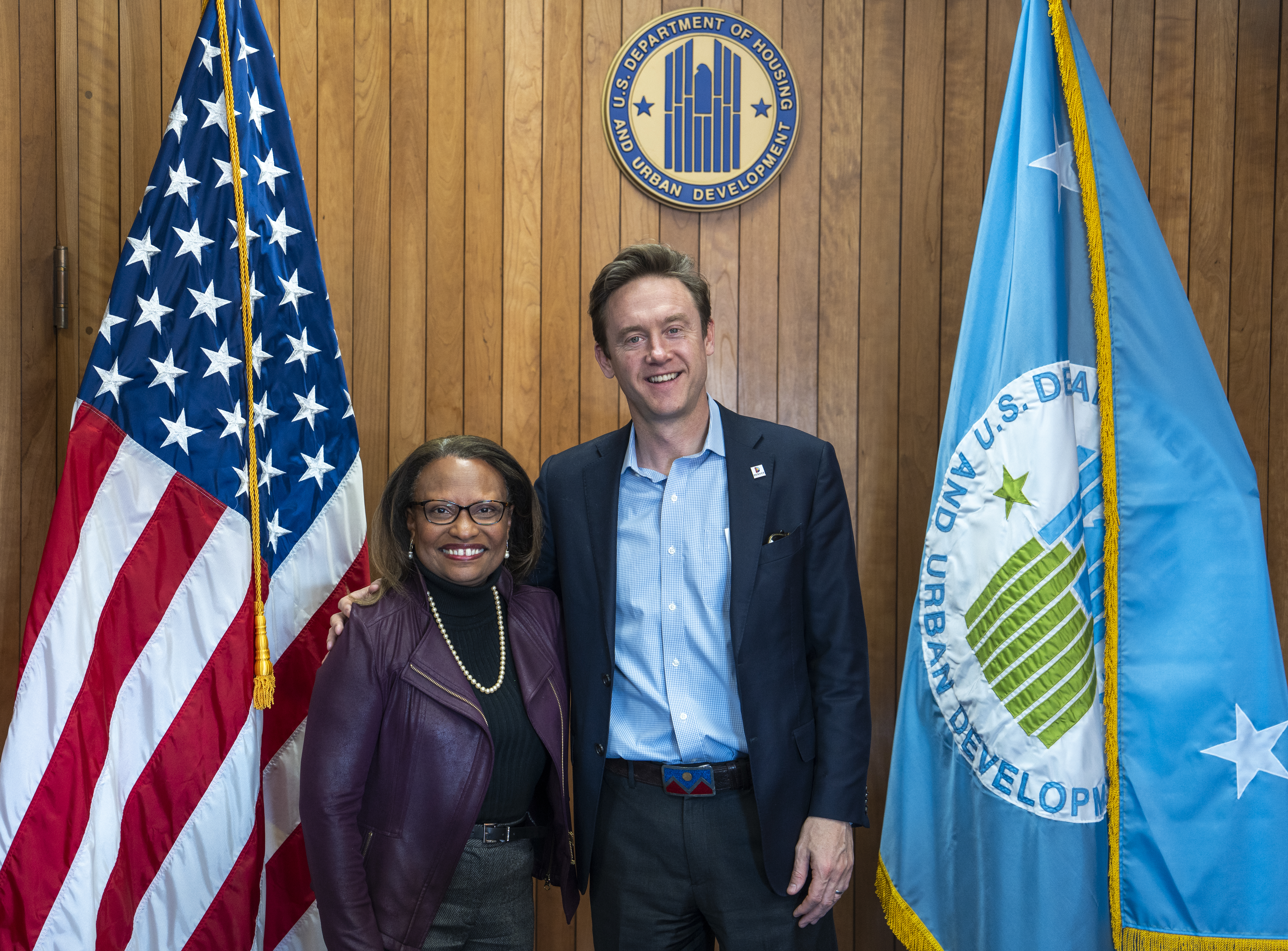
Johnston meets with Deputy Secretary of Housing and Urban Development

Johnston successfully ran for mayor of Denver in 2023, succeeding Michael Hancock, who was term-limited. A nonpartisan blanket primary was held on April 4, where he finished in first place and former Denver Metro Chamber of Commerce CEO Kelly Brough finished in second place. Since no candidate received a majority of the vote, they faced each other in a June 6 runoff election, where Johnston won by a comfortable margin. Brough conceded the race later that night. His campaign was endorsed by The Denver Post and many progressive figures in the runoff, while Brough's support came from more conservative groups.

=== Tenure ===
Johnston was sworn into office on July 17, 2023, along with new members of the city council and other municipal leaders. The next day, Johnston declared a state of emergency relating to homelessness in Denver. He said that his administration will seek to find housing for 1,000 unsheltered individuals by the end of 2023 and that he will tour 78 local neighborhoods and explore options for the placement of tiny houses.

The city of Denver has a strong mayor system of government. The mayor of Denver can veto things City Council passes with control over the management of the city. The Denver mayor appoints over 700 positions on more than 130 boards and commissions.

Johnston announced Give 5 Mile High during the 2024 State of the City Address. It is a volunteer initiative led by his wife Courtney Johnston. They urge volunteers in the city of Denver to commit to at least five hours of community service a month. They also hold a community service event on the third Saturday of every month. Courtney Johnston was inspired by a trip to Rwanda in 2022, where they learned about mandated once-a-month community service. This program aims to connect the people of Denver to their communities and networks of service.

In July 2024, the Denver police department began the Trust Patrol program. Johnston established this plan to reduce crime in the city of Denver. The Trust Patrol program functions by bringing police officers to areas where the public gathers so they can interact without a law enforcement function. This was established to connect the police force with the community.

Johnston created the Denver Asylum Seekers Program in response to Denver's influx of over 43,000 undocumented immigrants in 2024. The program offering legal support, English classes, and job training to help integrate and contribute to the local economy.

The launch of Johnston's Vibrant Denver plan, aimed to transform downtown into a "Central Neighborhood District" with mixed-use housing, vibrant public spaces, and thriving businesses. The redevelopment of the 16th Street Mall was a key part of this effort to reinvigorate the city's urban core.

In October 2025, after the city council voted to end the Denver's relationship with Flock Safety over privacy concerns, Johnston extended the contract without council approval.

Johnston began 2026 with an open letter to Jared Polis. He used a recent stabbing spree on 16th street as an example for why Colorado needs to make it easier to hold mentally incompetent people in custody, and said the state should jail more shoplifters to protect business owners. He also encouraged Polis to prevent the implementation of Colorado's AI consumer protection laws because he says they will slow innovation.

== Political positions ==
Johnston has been described as both a moderate liberal and a progressive. In his 2024 agenda, Johnston discussed homelessness and affordable housing, violent gun crime, addiction and mental health and revitalizing neighborhoods throughout Denver. While a member of the Colorado Senate, Johnston sponsored bills regarding education, the environment, and housing, among other topics.

=== Affordable housing ===
In 2024, Johnston proposed Ballot Issue 2R, a measure that would have raised the city's sales tax by 0.5% in order to allocate the money to support affordable housing. It was rejected by a 50.99% majority that voted against it.

=== Climate action ===
Johnston supports Denver's climate action plan, which aims to eliminate the city's greenhouse gas emissions by 2040. In 2023, he appointed Elizabeth Babcock to be the executive director of Denver's Office of Climate Action, Sustainability & Resiliency. In his 2025 budget proposal, Johnston allotted more money for climate initiatives. In July 2025, Johnston's administration launched a $3 million marketing campaign encouraging Denverites to engage in more climate-friendly actions, including walking and biking instead of driving, and eating more plant-based foods in place of meat.

Johnston reviewed the city's annual progress near the end of 2025. The city had planted about 4500 trees about 2,000 more than a typical year. However, the city had planned to reduce emissions to 40% below 2019 levels, and did not make significant progress toward the goal. Instead, Johnston gathered a commission to lower the goals. The former goal was in line with the Paris Climate Accords and was passed in a "landslide" election. Instead of converting the police vehicle fleet to all electric as the former plan called for, Johnston wants to keep internal combustion vehicles so they can do PIT maneuvers. Ean Thomas Tafoya, who ran for mayor but endorsed Johnston after dropping out, stated that Johnston frequently puts private business above climate action.

== Personal life ==
Johnston lives in Denver's Central Park neighborhood with his wife Courtney and their three children: Seamus, Emmet, and Ava. Courtney is a deputy district attorney who heads the juvenile unit of the Denver District Attorney's Office.

He speaks fluent Spanish.

== Electoral history ==
2012 Colorado Senate election, District 33
Party	Candidate	Votes	%
Democratic	Mike Johnston (incumbent)	51,357	82.3
Republican	Jason DeBerry	8,456	13.6
Libertarian	Courtney Kolva	2,579	4.1
Total votes		62,392	100
Democratic hold			

2018 Colorado gubernatorial Democratic primary
Party	Candidate	Votes	%
Democratic	Jared Polis	282,725	44.46
Democratic	Cary Kennedy	157,098	24.71
Democratic	Mike Johnston	149,717	23.55
Democratic	Donna Lynne	46,316	7.28
Total votes		635,856	100.0

2023 Denver mayoral election
Candidate	Votes	%
Nonpartisan blanket primary
Mike Johnston	42,273	24.45
Kelly Brough	34,627	20.03
Lisa Calderón	31,493	18.21
Andy Rougeot	19,927	11.52
Leslie Herod	18,506	10.70
Chris Hansen	8,309	4.81
Debbie Ortega	7,739	4.48
Ean Tafoya	2,700	1.56
Terrance Roberts	1,757	1.02
Thomas Wolf	1,747	1.01
Trinidad Rodriguez	1,240	0.72
Aurelio Martinez	755	0.44
Al Gardner	725	0.42
James Walsh	722	0.42
Renate Behrens	184	0.11
Robert Treta	169	0.10
Write-in	45	0.03
Total votes	172,918	100.00
Runoff election
Mike Johnston	89,644	55.15
Kelly Brough	72,906	44.85
Total votes	162,550	100.00

== Publications ==
- Johnston, Michael (2002). In the Deep Heart's Core. Foreword by Robert Coles. New York, NY: Grove Press. ISBN 978-0802117212.

== See also ==
- List of mayors of the 50 largest cities in the United States

Political offices
Preceded by Michael Hancock	Mayor of Denver; 2023–present	Incumbent
