= Celina Benavidez =

American politician and businesswoman

Member of the Colorado House of Representatives
- Constituency: Denver, Colorado

Personal details
- Party: Democratic
- Education: University of Albuquerque; Harvard Kennedy School
- Occupation: Politician, businesswoman

Celina Benavidez is a former state legislator in Colorado. She served in the Colorado House of Representatives. She represented Denver in the Colorado House of Representatives. She was a Democrat.

She was interviewed in 1995 by historian Richard Gould.

According to her business website she is a "native of Denver" and received a Degree in Business from the University of Albuquerque, was a Gates fellow, and graduated from the John F. Kennedy School of Government's Senior Executive Fellows Program at Harvard University.
