= Denver Public Schools =

Public school system in Colorado, U.S.

- Denver, Colorado

District information
- Type: Public
- Grades: Pre-K through 12
- Established: December 23, 1859; 166 years ago
- Superintendent: Dr. Alex Marrero
- Budget: $1,271,873,000
- NCES District ID: 0803360

Students and staff
- Students: 93,356
- Teachers: 6,081.42
- Staff: 14,445.08

Other information
- Website: www.dpsk12.org

The School District No. 1 in the City and County of Denver and State of Colorado, more commonly known as Denver Public Schools (DPS), is the public school system in the City and County of Denver, Colorado, United States.

== History ==
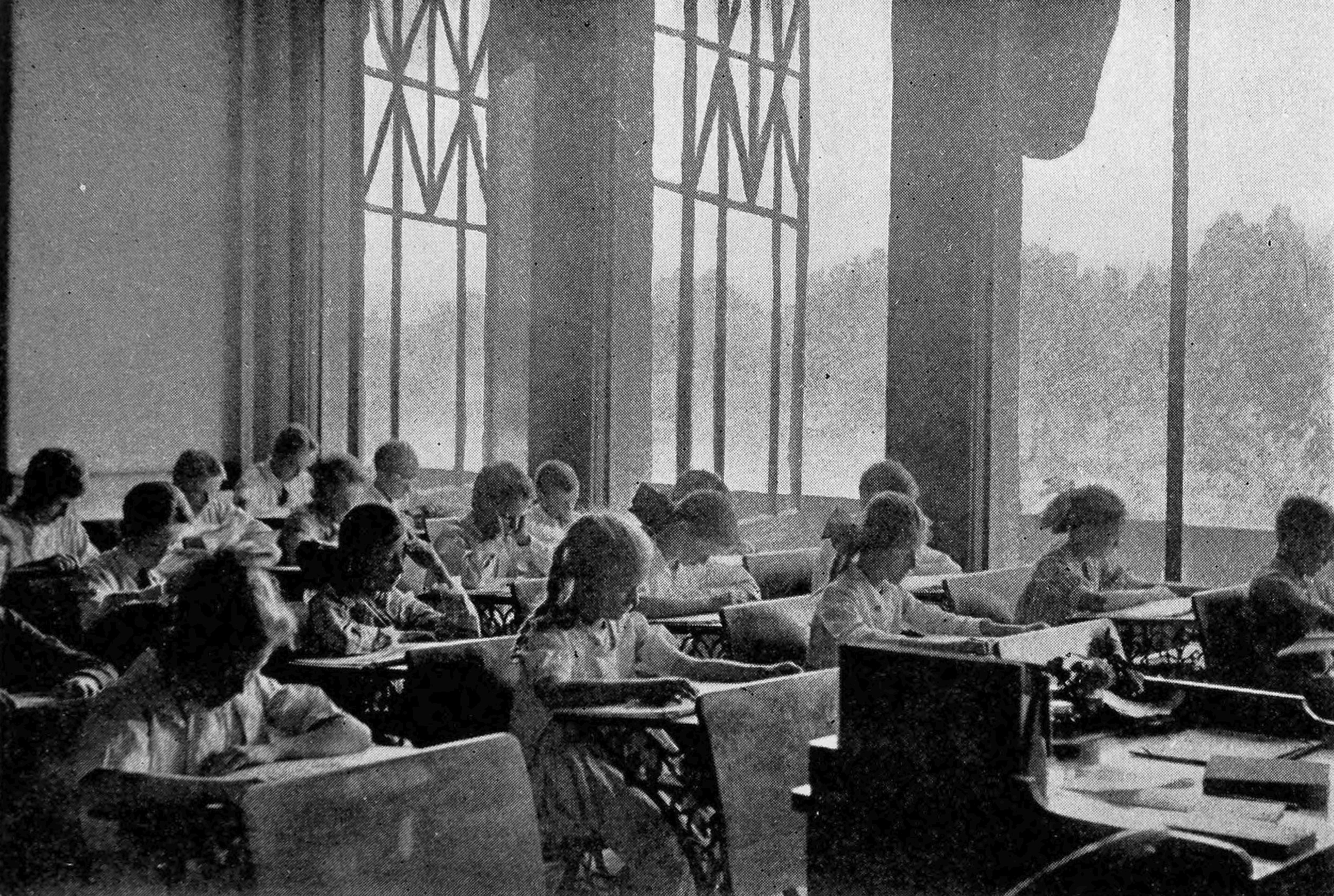
Robert W. Steele Elementary School in Denver, 1918

In 1859, Owen J. Goldrick established the Union School, Denver's first school, a private school that served thirteen students. Other private schools opened shortly thereafter to accommodate Denver's rapidly growing population during the Pike's Peak Gold Rush. In 1861, the new territorial government established Goldrick as the superintendent in Arapahoe County (which then encompassed Denver). Soon after the first two public school districts in Denver were formed: District One on the east side of the city and District Two on the west side. District Two opened the first public school in Denver on December 1, 1862 in a rented log cabin and District One followed suit soon after. On April 2, 1873 the first purpose built school building, the "Arapahoe School", opened.

In 1902, the 20th Amendment to the Constitution of the State of Colorado, known as the Rush Amendment, created the City and County of Denver, separating it from Arapahoe County. In 1903, Denver Public Schools was established. All school districts in Denver County were consolidated into Denver Public Schools, and Aaron Gove became the first-ever DPS Superintendent. Margaret Tupper True was president of the Denver School Board from 1906 to 1908, one of the first women to serve in such a role in a major city.

In 1994, Denver Public School teacher went on strike over classroom size, working conditions, and pay.

In 2015, the Brookings Institution ranked Denver Public Schools first in school choice among large school districts in the United States.

In 2018, Denver Public Schools joined other regional districts in banning its students from attending school-sanctioned trips to the Rocky Flats National Wildlife Refuge citing the history of the area's plutonium contamination and previous designation as a Superfund site.

In February 2019, teachers in the Denver Public Schools went on strike for three days as part of the larger wave of teachers' strikes across the United States that began in 2018. The teachers union, Denver Classroom Teachers Association (DCTA), demanded higher pay and school funding as well as a change to the teachers' compensation structure, which they said was overly reliant on bonuses instead of salary increases. It was the first strike in the district in 25 years. The deal that the union ultimately reached with the district kept some bonuses in place but also increased base salaries by 7 to 11 percent and created a new pay scale that puts more emphasis on teacher training and experience.

In 2020, all members of the board voted to remove police officers from schools in the wake of the murder of George Floyd.

== Organization ==
DPS is the sole public school district in Denver.

According to the Colorado Department of Education, DPS operates 198 schools with a total enrollment of 90,450 students as of October 2024. Of those, 52.6% of the school district's enrollment were Hispanic or Latino, 24.6% were White, 12.9% were Black or African American, 5% were two or more races, 3.2% were Asian, 1% were Native Hawaiian/Pacific Islander, and 0.5% were American Indian or Alaskan Native. 31.3% were English language learners, 9.1% were classified as Gifted and Talented, and 18.6% were Students with Disabilities (14% under the Individuals with Disabilities in Education Act and 4.6% under Section 504 of the Rehabilitation Act of 1973).

The official Denver Public Schools website listed somewhat different statistics, also as of October 2024. The number of schools was listed as 207, with a total enrollment of 90,452 students. The DPS website stated that 36.3% of students were classified as English language learners, 10.11% as Gifted and Talented, and 14% as Students with Disabilities. In addition, 62.63% of students were Free/Reduced-Price Lunch Eligible. However, the district provided all students regardless of family income a complete breakfast and lunch at no charge as of the 2024-2025 school year.

Under the leadership of Superintendent Tom Boasberg and guided by the tenets of the Denver Plan, DPS had the second-highest academic growth in the nation. The total of DPS graduates grew from 2,655 in 2006 to 3,608 in 2014. Drop-out rates dropped from 11.1% in 2006 to 4.5% in 2014.

=== School board ===
The Denver Board of Education is the policymaking body for DPS. The school board is made up of one representative from five districts and two at-large representatives, for a total of seven members. Dr. Carrie Olson was elected the school board president in 2019.

== Schools ==
As of August 2025, there are 198 active schools operated by Denver Public Schools, as identified by the Colorado Department of Education.

=== ECE Schools ===
- Escalante-Biggs Academy
- Pascual LeDoux Academy
- Sandra Todd-Williams Academy
- Stephen Knight Center for Early Ed.

=== Elementary schools ===
- Academia Ana Marie Sandoval
- Asbury Elementary School
- Ashley Elementary School
- Barney Ford Elementary School
- Barnum Elementary School
- Beach Court Elementary School
- Bradley Elementary School
- Bromwell Elementary School
- Brown International Academy
- Carson Elementary School
- Centennial School
- Center for Talent Development - Greenlee
- Charles M. Schenck Community School
- Cheltenham Elementary School
- Cole Arts and Sciences Academy
- Colfax Elementary School
- College View Elementary School
- Columbine Elementary School
- Cory Elementary School
- Cowell Elementary School
- Denver Center For International Studies at Fairmont
- Denison Montessori School
- Dora Moore Elementary
- Doull Elementary School
- Eagleton Elementary School
- Edison Elementary School
- Ellis Elementary School
- Force Elementary School
- Garden Place Academy
- Godsman Elementary School
- Goldrick Elementary School
- Green Valley Elementary School
- Gust Elementary School
- Hallett Academy
- Holm Elementary School
- Inspire Elementary School
- Isabella Bird Community School
- Joe Shoemaker School
- John H. Amesse Elementary School
- Johnson Elementary School
- Kaiser Elementary School
- Knapp Elementary School
- Lena Archuleta Elementary School
- Lincoln Elementary School
- Lowry Elementary School
- Maxwell Elementary School
- Marrama Elementary School
- McKinley-Thatcher Elementary School
- McMeen Elementary School
- Montclair School
- Munroe Elementary School
- Newlon Elementary School
- Oakland Elementary School
- Palmer Elementary School
- Park Hill Elementary School
- Polaris Elementary School
- Responsive Arts & STEAM Academy FNE
- Rocky Mountain School of Expeditionary Learning (K-12 and not a district school)
- Sabin World School
- Samuels Elementary School
- Smith Elementary School
- Southmoor Elementary School
- Steck Elementary School
- Stedman Elementary School
- Steele Elementary School
- Swansea Elementary School
- Swigert International School
- Teller Elementary School
- Traylor Academy
- Trevista at Horace Mann
- University Park Elementary School
- Valverde Elementary School
- Westerly Creek Elementary School
- Escuela Valdez
- Willow Elementary School

=== K-8 ===
- Bryant Webster Dual Language ECE-8
- Denver Green School Southeast
- Farrell B. Howell ECE-8
- Florida Pitt Waller ECE-8
- Grant Ranch ECE-8
- Marie L. Greenwood Academy
- McGlone Academy
- Place Bridge Academy
- Slavens K-8
- Whittier ECE-8 School
- William (Bill) Roberts K-8

=== Middle/Junior high schools ===
- Bear Valley International School
- Denver Center for International Studies
- Denver Green School Northfield
- Grant Beacon Middle School
- Hamilton Middle School
- Hill Campus of Arts and Sciences
- Manual Middle School
- Morey Middle School
- Kepner Beacon Middle School
- Kunsmiller Creative Arts Academy
- Lake Middle School
- McAuliffe International School
- Merrill Middle School
- Montbello Middle School
- Skinner Middle School

=== Senior high schools ===
- Abraham Lincoln High School
- Bruce Randolph School
- Career Education Center Early College
- Compassion Road Academy
- Contemporary Learning Academy
- DELTA High School
- Denver Center for 21st Century Learning
- Denver Montessori Junior/Senior High
- Denver Online
- Denver School of the Arts
- Dr. Martin Luther King Jr. Early College
- East High School
- Emily Griffith High School
- Excel Academy
- Florence Crittenton High School
- George Washington High School
- John F. Kennedy High School
- Kunsmiller Creative Arts Academy
- Legacy Options High School
- Manual High School
- Montbello Career and Technical
- Montbello High School
- North High School
- Northeast Early College
- Northfield High School
- PREP Academy (6-12)
- Respect Academy
- Robert F. Smith STEAM Academy
- South High School
- Summit Academy
- Thomas Jefferson High School
- Vista Academy
- West High School

=== Charter schools ===
- 5280 High School
- Academy 360
- American Indian Academy of Denver
- AUL Denver
- Colorado High School Charter
- Compass Academy
- Denver Justice High School
- Denver Language School
- Downtown Denver Expeditionary School
- DSST: Cedar High School
- DSST: Cedar Middle School
- DSST: Cole High School
- DSST: Cole Middle School
- DSST: College View High School
- DSST: College View Middle School
- DSST: Conservatory Green High School
- DSST: Conservatory Green Middle School
- DSST: Elevate Northeast High School
- DSST: Elevate Northeast Middle School
- DSST: Green Valley Ranch High School
- DSST: Green Valley Ranch Middle School
- DSST: Montview High School
- DSST: Montview Middle School
- French American School of Denver
- Girls Athletic Leadership School
- Highline Academy - Northeast Campus
- Highline Academy - Southeast Campus
- KIPP Denver Collegiate High School
- KIPP Northeast Denver Leadership Academy
- KIPP Northeast Denver Middle School
- KIPP Northeast Elementary
- KIPP Sunshine Peak Academy
- KIPP Sunshine Peak Elementary
- Monarch Montessori
- Odyssey School of Denver
- Omar D. Blair Charter School
- RiseUp Community School
- Rocky Mountain Prep Berkeley
- Rocky Mountain Prep Creekside
- Rocky Mountain Prep Federal
- Rocky Mountain Prep Green Valley Ranch
- Rocky Mountain Prep Noel
- Rocky Mountain Prep RISE
- Rocky Mountain Prep Ruby Hill
- Rocky Mountain Prep SMART Academy
- Rocky Mountain Prep Southwest
- Rocky Mountain Prep Sunnyside
- Rocky Mountain Prep Westwood
- SOAR at Green Valley Ranch
- University Prep – Arapahoe Street
- University Prep – Steele Street
- Wyatt Academy

== Student demographics ==
1. Hispanic (56.1%)
2. White (22.6%)
3. Black (13.8%)
4. Asian or Pacific Islander (3.50%)
5. American Indian or Alaskan Native (0.60%)
6. Two or more races (3.50%)

Historical student population
Year	Pop.	±%
2005	73,018	—
2006	73,399	+0.5%
2007	78,873	+7.5%
2008	75,269	−4.6%
2009	78,352	+4.1%
2010	79,423	+1.4%
2011	81,870	+3.1%
2012	84,424	+3.1%
2013	87,398	+3.5%
2014	90,150	+3.1%
2015	91,429	+1.4%
2016	92,331	+1.0%
2017	92,984	+0.7%

In the 2016–2017 school year, 92,331 students were enrolled in 207 Denver Public Schools consisting of 8 Early Childhood Education or K-12 schools, 92 elementary, 18 ECE-8 or K-8, 34 middle, 12 schools with grades 6-12, and 44 traditional high schools.

71.7 percent (62,977) of public school students qualified for free or reduced price lunch in the 2013–2014 school year.

There were 11,932 employees of DPS; 4,329 of them were teachers.

=== Race ===
Although Denver is more than 52 percent non-Hispanic white, minority groups represent double the regular Denver population. The reason for this has been white flight over the past few decades and extremely strong Hispanic school-age growth due to relatively high birth rates. The predominant heritage in the Denver Public School system is Mexican American. Denver has a high Hispanic percentage of roughly 32%, and they are a majority in the public school system.
