= Wellington Webb =

American politician (born 1941)

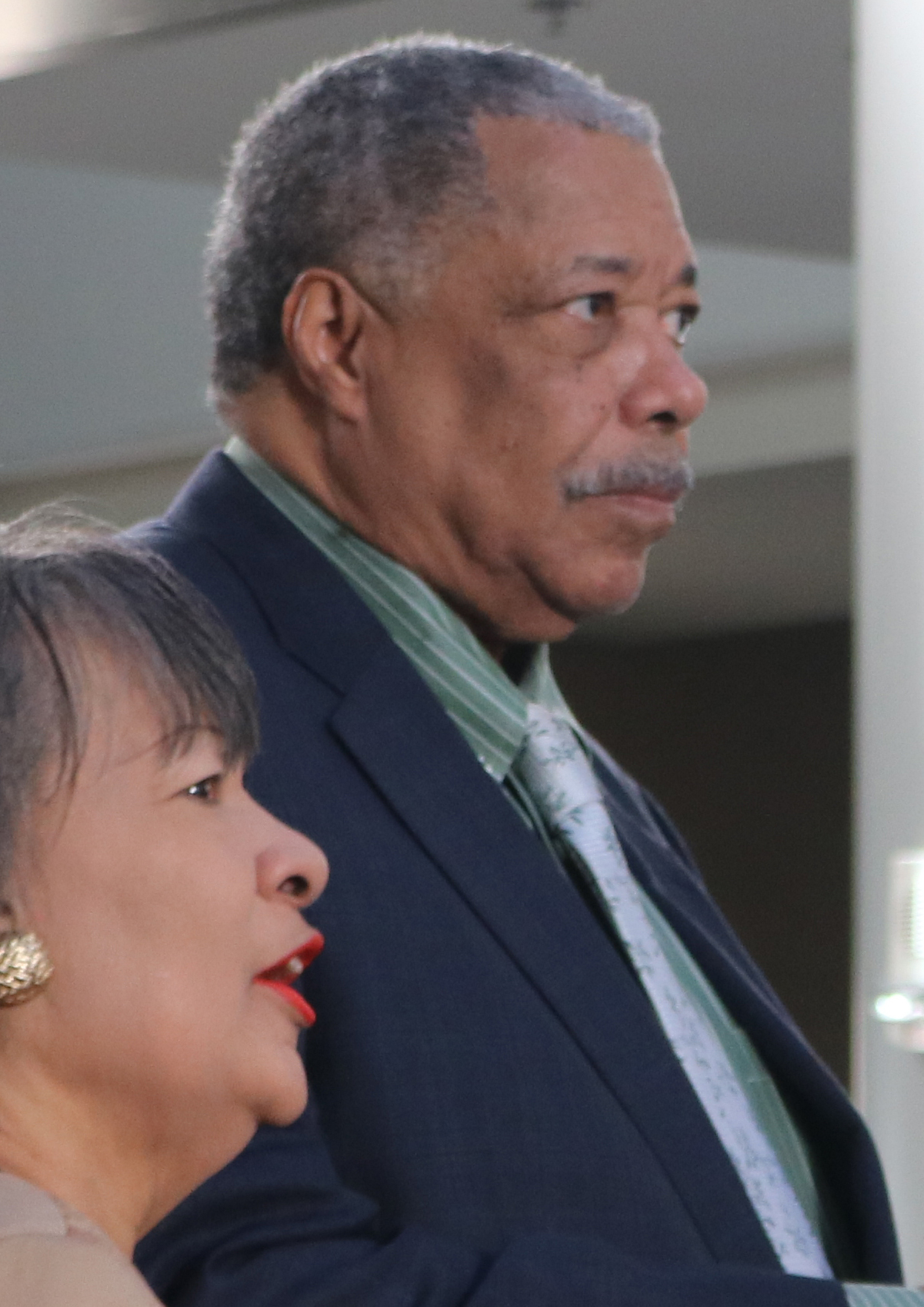
- Webb in 2017

42nd Mayor of Denver
- In office July 15, 1991 – July 21, 2003
- Preceded by: Federico Peña
- Succeeded by: John Hickenlooper

57th President of the United States Conference of Mayors
- In office 1999–2000
- Preceded by: Deedee Corradini
- Succeeded by: Brent Coles

Member of the Colorado House of Representatives
- In office 1973–1977

Personal details
- Born: February 17, 1941 (age 85) Chicago, Illinois, U.S.
- Party: Democratic
- Spouse: Wilma Webb (m. 1969)
- Children: 4
- Education: Colorado State College (BA, MA)

Wellington E. Webb (born February 17, 1941) is an American politician. He served as a Democratic member of the Colorado House of Representatives and was the first African American mayor of Denver, Colorado, serving from 1991 to 2003.

== Early life and career ==
The Webb family relocated from Chicago to the Northeast section of Denver in August 1954, where Webb became active in sports. He is a graduate of Denver's Manual High School. Webb was an all-conference basketball player at Northeastern Junior College in Sterling, Colorado, in 1960. He obtained his B.A. in sociology from Colorado State College in 1964 and his M.A. in sociology from the same school, now known as the University of Northern Colorado, in 1971.

== Career ==
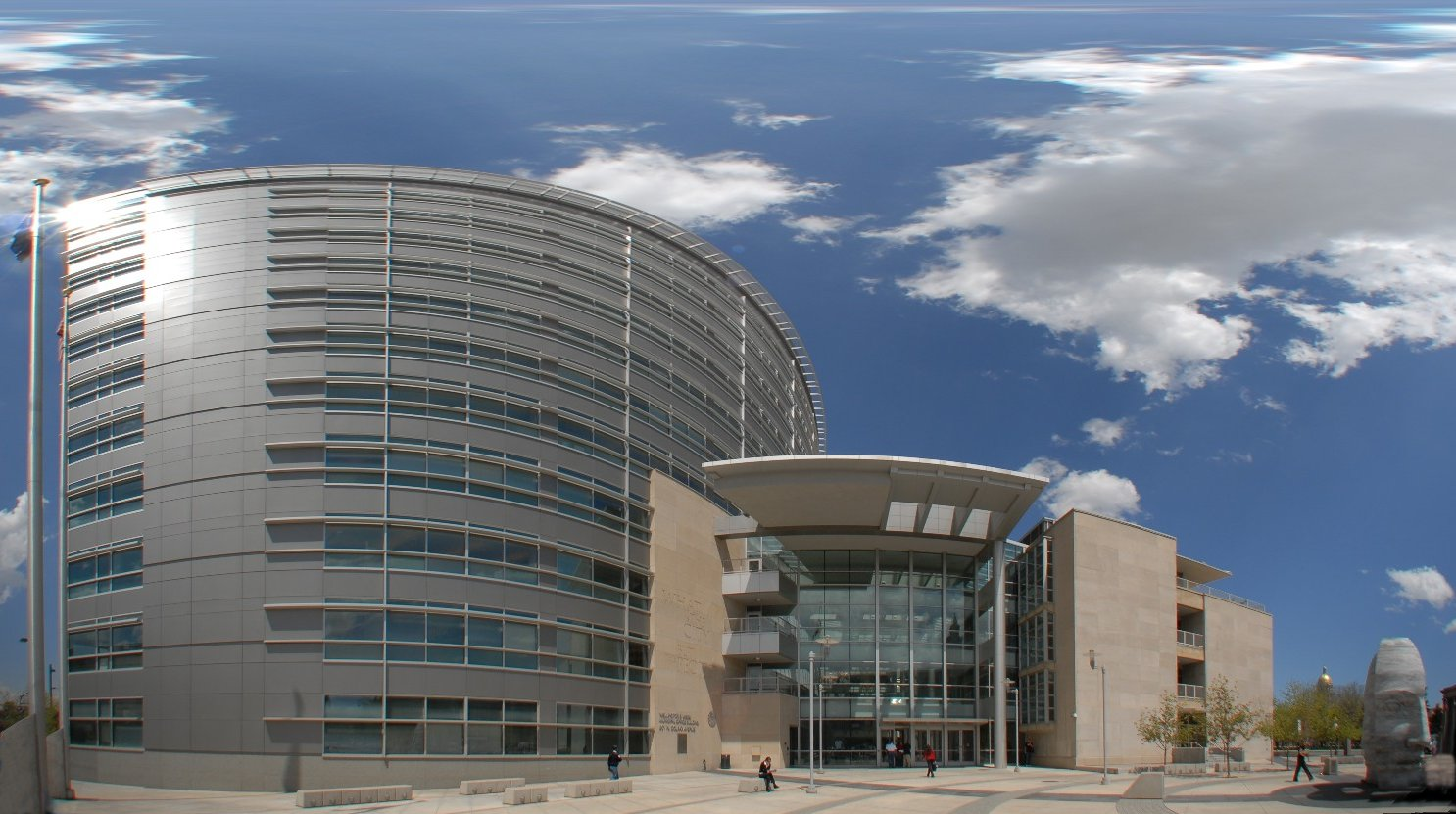
Wellington E. Webb Municipal Office Building

In 1972, Webb was elected to the Colorado House of Representatives, representing northeast Denver. In 1977, Webb was selected by President Jimmy Carter to serve as regional director of the U.S. Department of Health, Education, and Welfare. In 1981, Colorado Governor Richard Lamm appointed Webb to his cabinet as executive director of the Colorado Department of Regulatory Agencies (DORA). Webb was elected Denver city auditor in 1987 and served until 1991.

=== Mayor of Denver ===
Wellington Webb's 1991 bid for mayor included his "Sneaker Campaign", in which he walked door to door through a large portion of Denver, introducing himself as a relatively unknown candidate.

Webb served as mayor of Denver for 12 years, from 1991 to 2003. One highlight of his years in office was the South Platte River Corridor Project, involving commercial and residential redevelopment, as well as reclamation of park land, along the South Platte River in central Denver. He was also mayor at the time of the completion of Denver International Airport, started by his predecessor, Federico Peña.

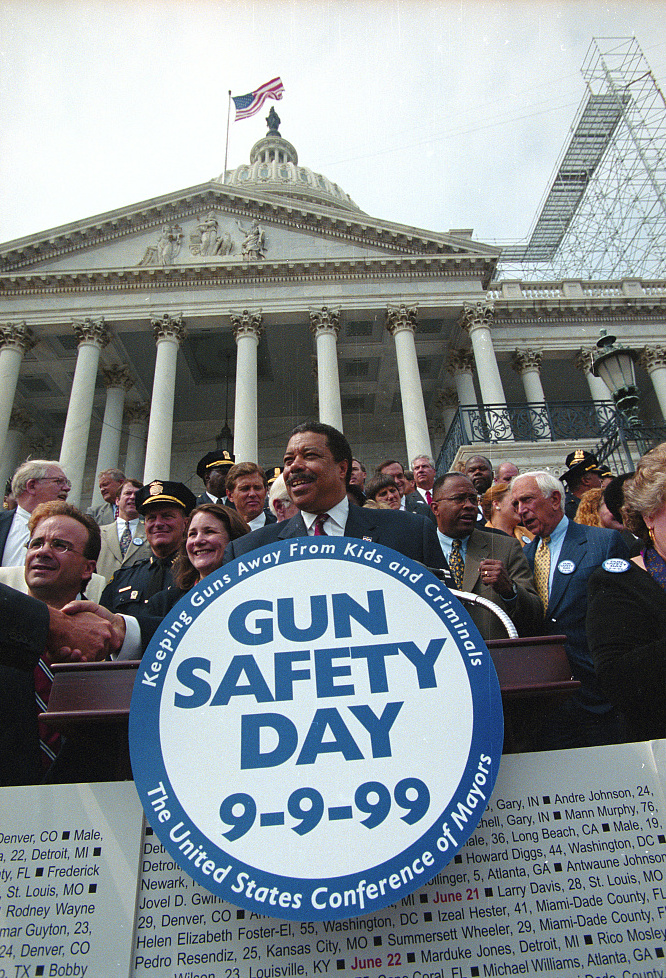
Mayor Webb (center), with others at a rally on the steps of the U.S. Capitol on "Gun Safety Day" organized by the U.S. Conference of Mayors

In his three terms as mayor of Denver, Webb focused on four major areas: parks and open space, public safety, economic development and children. Accomplishments during his administration include a record 40 percent decrease in crime since 1991 as unemployment dipped below 2 percent. Webb's development projects include the new Denver International Airport, a new sports stadium, expansion of the Denver Art Museum and a new African American Research Library.

Webb is the former president of the National Conference Democratic Mayors, the past president of the U.S. Conference of Mayors and National Conference of Black Mayors.

=== Later career ===
He lectures frequently on civic issues and was a guest lecturer at the Harvard Kennedy School. Webb collaborates closely with his wife, former Colorado State Representative Wilma Webb.

In 2001, Webb served on the selection committee for the Rudy Bruner Award for Urban Excellence.

Webb was mentioned in the documentary Bowling for Columbine during a speech by National Rifle Association president Charlton Heston. In April 1999, shortly after the high school shootings at Columbine High School near Denver, Heston claimed that Webb had asked him not to come to Denver.

Although he briefly sought the office of chairman of the Democratic National Committee in late 2004, Webb dropped out of the race in late January 2005 and endorsed fellow candidate Howard Dean, who went on to win the chairmanship. Webb was well known as the only African-American candidate for the DNC chairmanship.

The Wellington E. Webb Municipal Office Building, completed in Fall 2002, was named in honor of Webb. It houses some forty municipal agencies and divisions from the City and County of Denver, as well as the office of the District Attorney.

In November 2006 The Wellington E. Webb Center for Primary Care opens at Denver Health Medical Center, becoming the first in the country community health center adjacent to an acute care hospital.

In February 2007, Webb published his autobiography, The Man, the Mayor and the Making of Modern Denver (Fulcrum Publishing), co-written by former Colorado journalist Cindy Brovsky.

In 2008, Webb supported Barack Obama and Joe Biden as one of Colorado's presidential electors.

== Personal life ==
He has been married to Wilma Webb since 1969. They have four children.

== See also ==
- List of first African-American mayors

== Notes ==
Political offices
Preceded by Federico Peña	Mayor of Denver; 1991–2003	Succeeded by John Hickenlooper
Preceded by Deedee Corradini; Salt Lake City, UT	President of the United States Conference of Mayors; 1999–2000	Succeeded by H. Brent Coles; Boise, ID
