= Denver City Council =

Mayor–council government of Denver, Colorado, USA

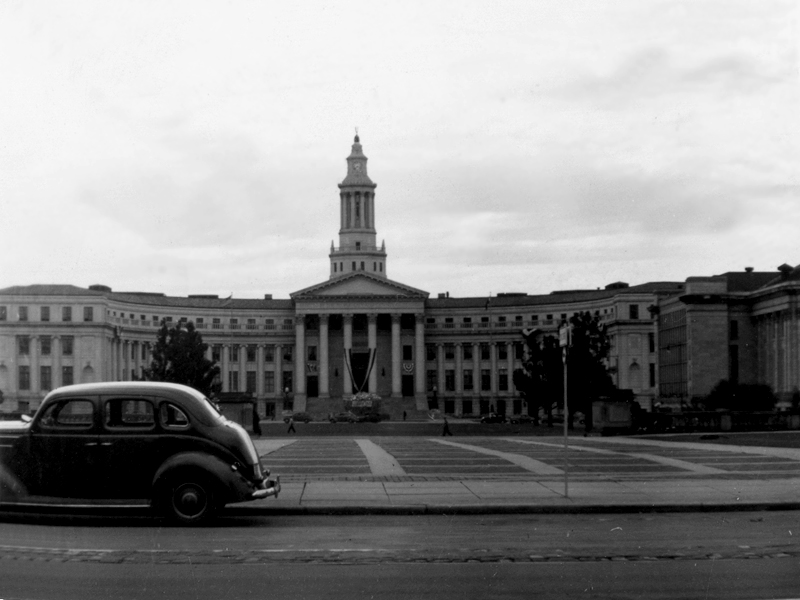
The City and County Building (seen here in 1941) is the home of the city council.

The Denver City Council is the legislative branch of government for the City and County of Denver, Colorado. The council is made up of thirteen elected officials from eleven City and county designated districts and two at-large elected members. Although the offices are officially non-partisan, the members are allowed to be affiliated with a political party. Most commonly in Denver history, members are almost always members of the Democratic Party. Elections for all members are held every four years; the most recent were in 2023. The council elects a president to serve as a leader annually.

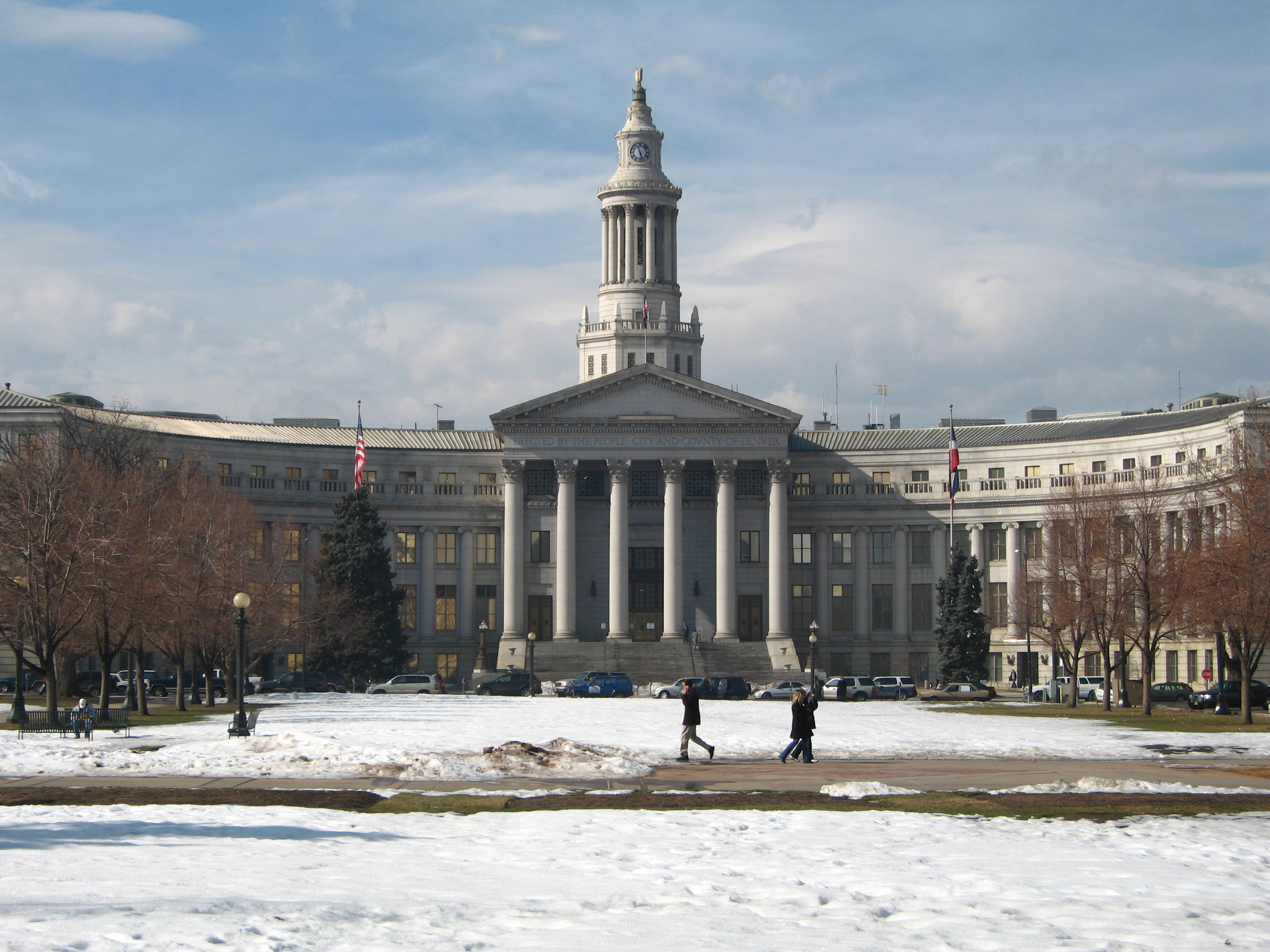
City and County Building, Winter 2007

== Members ==
The current city council members are:

- District 1: Amanda Sandoval
- District 2: Kevin Flynn
- District 3: Jamie Torres
- District 4: Diana Romero Campbell
- District 5: Amanda Sawyer
- District 6: Paul Kashmann
- District 7: Flor Alvidrez
- District 8: Shontel Lewis
- District 9: Darrell Watson
- District 10: Christopher Hinds
- District 11: Stacie Gilmore
- At-Large: Serena Gonzales-Gutierrez
- At-Large: Vacant

== See also ==
- Gay Coalition of Denver
- Government of Colorado
