= 2018 Colorado gubernatorial election =

- November 6, 2018
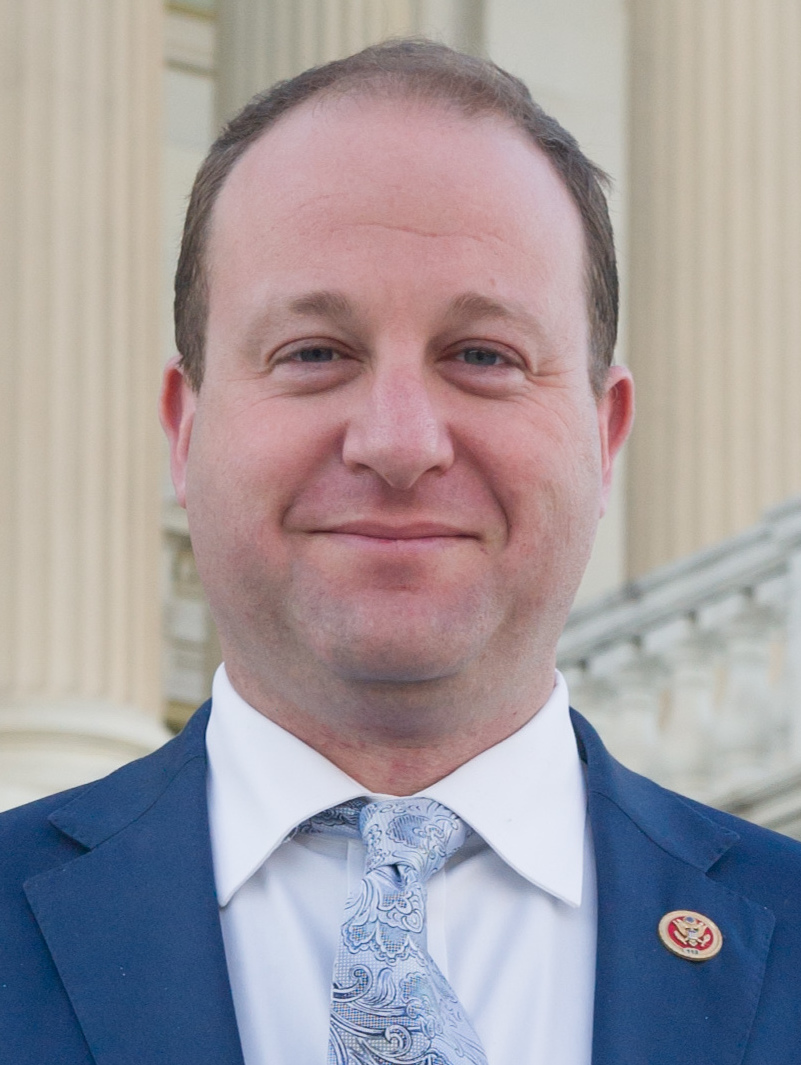

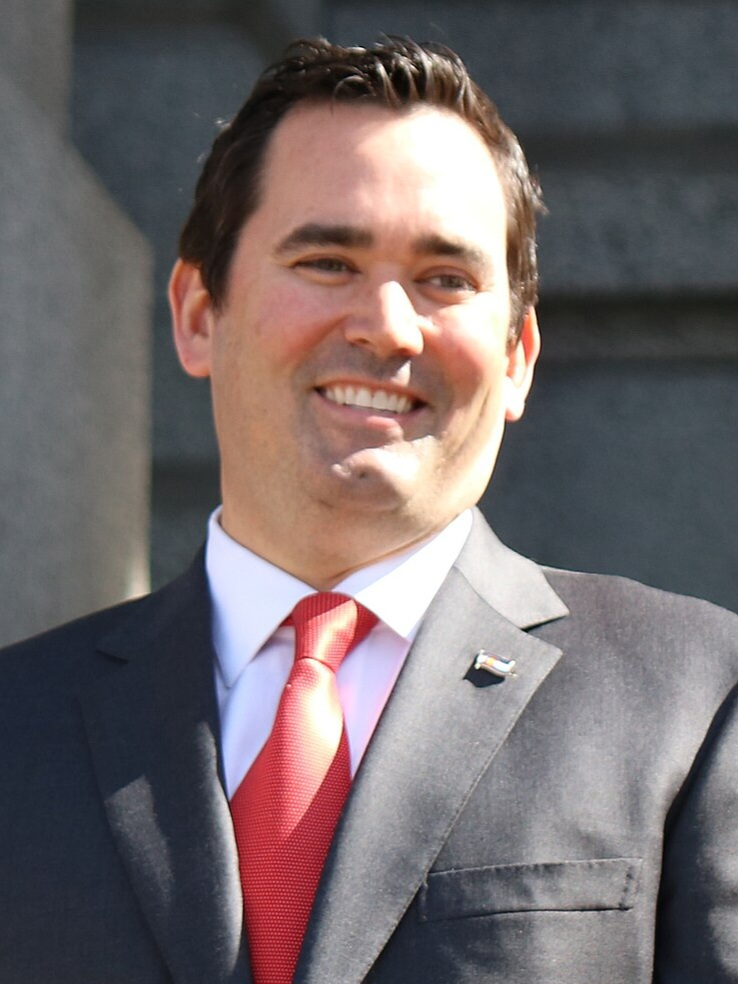
Nominee	Jared Polis	Walker Stapleton
Party	Democratic	Republican
Running mate	Dianne Primavera	Lang Sias
Popular vote	1,348,888	1,080,801
Percentage	53.42%	42.80%
- Polis: 40–50% 50–60% 60–70% 70–80% 80–90% >90% Stapleton: 40–50% 50–60% 60–70% 70–80% 80–90% >90% Tie: 40–50% No votes
Governor before election
John Hickenlooper
Democratic
Elected Governor
Jared Polis
Democratic

The 2018 Colorado gubernatorial election took place on November 6, 2018, to elect the next governor of Colorado. Incumbent Democratic Governor John Hickenlooper was term-limited and could not seek a third consecutive term. The primary election was held on June 26.

The major party nominees were Democratic U.S. Representative Jared Polis and Republican State Treasurer Walker Stapleton. The general election took place on November 6, 2018, with Polis winning by 268,000 votes. This was the first Colorado gubernatorial election in which both major party candidates received over one million votes.

Polis's victory marked the fourth straight election in which Colorado elected a Democratic governor, the state's first Jewish governor and the first time in American electoral history that an openly gay politician was elected governor of a state.

== Democratic primary ==
With Hickenlooper ineligible to run for a third term in office, multiple Democratic politicians vied for the party's nomination for governor. Prior to his resignation in 2015, former lieutenant governor Joseph Garcia was seen as a probable candidate for governor in 2018.

=== Candidates ===
==== Nominated ====
- Jared Polis, U.S. Representative

==== Eliminated in the primary ====
- Mike Johnston, former state senator
- Cary Kennedy, former Colorado State Treasurer and former CFO and Deputy Mayor of Denver
- Donna Lynne, Lieutenant Governor of Colorado

==== Eliminated at the convention ====
- Erik Underwood, former congressional aide, Republican candidate for GA-10 in 2007 and Republican candidate for the U.S. Senate in 2016

==== Withdrawn ====
- Noel Ginsburg, businessman
- Ed Perlmutter, U.S. Representative (ran for reelection)

==== Declined ====
- Joseph Garcia, former lieutenant governor
- Steve Lebsock, State Representative (was running for State Treasurer before switching to the Republican Party, thus disqualifying him from the Democratic Primary)
- Michael Merrifield, State Senator
- Joe Neguse, former executive director of the Colorado Department of Regulatory Agencies and nominee for secretary of state in 2014 (ran for CO-02)
- Joe Salazar, State Representative (ran for Attorney General)
- Ken Salazar, former U.S. senator and former United States Secretary of the Interior

==== Caucus results ====
On March 6, 2018, Democrats of precincts across Colorado met and voted how many delegates each candidate who was caucusing on the ballot would get. As of March 11, 2018 at 7:30 p.m., 96.83% of precincts had reported and added up to the below results.

- Cary Kennedy (11,700; 49.2%)
- Jared Polis (7,784; 32.7%)
- Mike Johnston (2,086; 8.8%)
- Noel Ginsburg (433; 1.8%), dropped out of race
- Erik Underwood (100; 0.4%)
- Uncommitted (1,668; 7%)

=== Endorsements ===
Jared Polis

Federal officials

- Luis Gutiérrez, United States Representative
- John Lewis, United States Representative
- Betsy Markey, former United States Representative
- Barack Obama, former United States President
- Pat Schroeder, former United States Representative

State Senators

- Polly Baca, former
- Steve Fenberg
- Tom Glass, former, former Mayor of Crested Butte
- Rob Hernandez, former
- John Kefalas
- Claire Levy, former
- Chris Romer, former
- Sue Windels, former

State Representatives

- Jeni Arndt
- Adrienne Benavidez
- Jeff Bridges
- Ed Casso
- Mike Foote
- Matt Gray
- Leslie Herod
- Edie Hooton
- Dickey Lee Hullinghorst, former Speaker
- Joe Miklosi
- Angie Paccione
- Cherylin Peniston
- Dianne Primavera
- Debbie Stafford
- Val Vigil, former, also member of Thornton City Council
- Roger Wilson

County Commissioners

- Jorge Amaya, former, Alamosa County
- Hillary Cooper, San Miguel County Commissioner
- Thomas Davidson, Summit County
- Cindy Domenico, Boulder County
- Deb Gardner, Boulder County
- Dan Gibbs, Summit County
- Eva Henry, Adams County
- Elise Jones, Boulder County
- Tim Mauck, Clear Creek
- Buffie McFadyen, former, Pueblo County
- Garrison Ortiz, Pueblo County
- Sal Pace, Pueblo County
- Karn Stiegelmeier, Summit County
- Will Toor, former, Boulder County

Mayors

- Christine Berg, Lafayette
- Dennis Coombs, former, Longmont
- Cecil Gutierrez, Loveland
- Suzanne Jones, Boulder
- Bob Muckle, Louisville
- Sean Murphy, Telluride
- Susan Osborne, former, Boulder
- Gustavo Reynar, pro tem, Lafayette
- Tiffany A. Snyder, former, Ward
- Dr. John Warner, former, Breckenridge
- Jacque Whitsitt, Basalt

City Councilors

- Yolanda Avila, Colorado Springs
- Rich Ball, Loveland
- Aaron Brockett, Boulder
- Dean Brookie, Durango
- Ed Brown, Pueblo
- Maria De Cambra, Westminster
- Mack Goodman, Thornton
- Leah Johnson, Loveland
- Kevin Kreeger, Broomfield
- Paul Lopez, Denver
- Ramona Martinez, former, Denver
- Lisa Morzel, Boulder
- Francoise Poinsatte, former, Boulder
- Andy Schultheiss, former, Boulder
- Andrew Shoemaker, Boulder
- Richard Skorman, Colorado Springs
- Kristin Stephen, Fort Collins
- Sam Weaver, Boulder

Others

- Anthony Aragon, LGBTQ leader
- Beverly Breakstone, Summit County Assessor
- Jeff Chostner, Pueblo County District Attorney, former County Commissioner, former State Representative
- Nancy Cronk, Director of the Cunningham Fire Protection District's Board of Directors
- Stan Garnnet, Boulder County District Attorney
- Bob Hullinghorst, former Boulder County Treasurer
- Dave Levy, Thompson School Board member
- Denise Montague, Thompson School Board member
- Rick Palacio, former Colorado Democratic Party Chairman
- Beverly Benavidez Ryken, former Vice Chair of the Colorado Democratic Party
- Angelika Schroeder, Chairwoman of the State Board of Education
- Jeri Shepherd, DNC member
- John Tayer, former RTD Board member
- Nancy Tellez, former Poudre School Board member

Organizations

- Colorado Professional Firefighters (CPFF)
- Humane Society
- IBEW Colorado – International Brotherhood of Electrical Workers
- National Cannabis Industry Association
- National Organization for the Reform of Marijuana Laws (NORML)
- Pipefitters Local 208
- Sierra Club
- Southwest Regional Council of Carpenters
- Victory Fund
Mike Johnston

Federal officials

- Gary Hart, former U.S. Senator for Colorado

State officials

- Irene Aguilar, State Senator
- Terrance Carroll, former Speaker of the House of Representatives
- James Coleman, State Representative
- Kerry Donovan, State Senator
- Rhonda Fields, State Senator
- Joyce Foster, former State Senator
- Angela Giron, former State Senator
- Millie Hamner, State Representative
- Richard Lamm, former Governor
- John Morse, former State Senate President
- Christine Scanlan, former State Representative
- Wilma Webb, former State Representative

Local officials

- Gabrielle Aragon, former San Luis Council member
- Albus Brooks, Denver City Council President
- Lisa Flores, Denver Public School Board of Education member
- Tracy Johnson, Academy District 20 Board of Education member
- Jeanne McQueeney, Eagle County Commissioner
- Theresa Peña, formerDenver Public Schools Board of Education member
- Christina Rinderle, former Durango Mayor
- Wellington Webb, former Mayor of Denver

Organizations

- Students for Education Reform

Newspapers

- The Daily Sentinel

Individuals

- Reid Hoffman, co-founder of LinkedIn
- Sheryl Sandberg, COO of Facebook
Cary Kennedy

Federal officials

- Ken Salazar, former U.S. Senator and United States Secretary of the Interior

State officials

- Bernie Buescher, former Secretary of State of Colorado
- Mike Callihan, former Lieutenant Governor
- Gail Schoettler, former Lieutenant Governor and former State Treasurer

State legislators

- Betty Boyd, former state senator
- Joan Fitz-Gerald, former President of the Colorado Senate
- Evie Hudak, former state senator
- Daniel Kagan, State Senator
- Chris Kennedy, State Representative
- Pete Lee, State Representative
- Susan Lontine, State Representative
- Alice Madden, former Majority Leader of the Colorado House of Representatives
- Rosemary Marshall, former State Representative
- Michael Merrifield, State Senator
- Jeanne Nicholson, former State Senator
- Pat Pascoe, former State Senator
- Tom Plant, former State Representative and former Director of the Governor’s Energy Office
- Peggy Reeves, former State Senator
- Joe Rice, former State Representative and former Mayor of Glendale
- Chris Romer, former State Senator
- Dorothy Rupert, former State Senator
- Brandon Shaffer, former President of the Colorado Senate
- Gloria Tanner, former State Senator
- Suzanne Williams, former State Senator
- Dave Young, State Representative

Local officials

- Doug Linkhart, Denver City Councilman and former State Senator
- Beth McCann, Denver District Attorney and former State Representative

Labor unions

- American Federation of Teachers-Colorado
- Colorado Education Association
- International Brotherhood of Teamsters Local 455
- United Association Local 58, Plumbers & Pipefitters
- United Steelworkers District 12

Organizations

- EMILY's List
Donna Lynne

State legislators

- Janet Buckner, State Representative
- Jean Dubofsky, former state Supreme Court Justice
- Joann Ginal, State Representative
- Lucía Guzmán, State Senator

Local officials

- Leanna Clark, vice chancellor for the University of Colorado Denver
- Kathy Maloney Green, Gov. John Hickenlooper’s former spokeswoman
- Jacque Montgomery, Gov. John Hickenlooper’s spokeswoman
- Marguerite Salazar, Colorado Department of Regulatory Agencies executive director
- Tamra Ward, Denver Zoo chief external relations officer
Ed Perlmutter (withdrawn)
- Pipefitters Local 208

=== Polling ===
Poll source	Date(s) administered	Sample size	Margin of error	Mike Johnston	Cary Kennedy	Donna Lynne	Jared Polis	Other	Undecided
Strategies 360	May 29 – June 6, 2018	387	± 5.0%	12%	23%	2%	34%	–	29%
Magellan Strategies (R)	May 30–31, 2018	503	± 4.4%	9%	18%	3%	31%	–	39%
TargetPoint/GQR	March 2018	–	–	–	18%	–	18%	12%	52%
Magellan Strategies (R)	March 20–23, 2018	410	± 4.8%	8%	23%	5%	27%	1%	36%
University of Colorado Boulder	November 9–15, 2017	357	± 3.5%	4%	6%	4%	24%	2%	58%

=== Results ===
Results by county: Polis: 30–40%; 40–50%; 50–60%; 60–70%; Kennedy: 30–40%; 40–50%; Johnston: 30–40%; 40–50%

Democratic primary results
Party	Candidate	Votes	%
Democratic	Jared Polis	282,725	44.46
Democratic	Cary Kennedy	157,098	24.71
Democratic	Mike Johnston	149,717	23.55
Democratic	Donna Lynne	46,316	7.28
Total votes		635,856	100.0

== Republican primary ==
=== Candidates ===
==== Nominated ====
- Walker Stapleton, Colorado State Treasurer

==== Eliminated in the primary ====
- Greg Lopez, former mayor of Parker
- Victor Mitchell, former state representative
- Doug Robinson, businessman

==== Eliminated at the convention ====
- Steve Barlock, former Trump campaigner, Colorado Republican National Alternate Delegate and Elector
- Cynthia Coffman, Colorado Attorney General
- Barry Farah, businessman
- Lew Gaiter, Larimer County Commissioner

==== Withdrawn ====
- George Brauchler, District Attorney for Colorado's 18th Judicial District (ran for attorney general)
- Jim Rundberg, businessman
- JoAnne Silva, retired banker
- Tom Tancredo, former U.S. Representative, candidate for governor in 2014, Constitution Party nominee for governor in 2010, and candidate for President of the United States in 2008

==== Declined ====
- John Elway, general manager of the Denver Broncos and retired NFL player
- Owen Hill, state senator and candidate for the U.S. Senate in 2014 (ran for CO-05)
- Steve House, Chairman of the Colorado Republican Party and candidate for governor in 2014
- Kent Thiry, chairman and CEO of DaVita Inc.
- Brian Watson, businessman and candidate for the State House in 2012 (ran for State Treasurer)

==== Caucus results ====
Based on information shared by some key counties, as well as a recent survey, the following are believed to be results of the Republican Caucus from key counties.

Pueblo County

- Steve Barlock – 3.14%
- Cynthia Coffman – 7.55%
- Greg Lopez – 16.35%
- Victor Mitchell – 23.90%
- Doug Robinson – 3.15%
- Walker Stapleton – 45.91%

Douglas County

- Steve Barlock – 32.5%
- Cynthia Coffman – 4.6%
- Lew Gaiter III – 2.2%
- Greg Lopez – 18.8%
- Victor Mitchell – 7.7%
- Doug Robinson – 2.2%
- Walker Stapleton – 23.2%
- Tom Tancredo (dropped out of the race) – 1.6%
- Uncommitted – 7.2%

=== Endorsements ===
George Brauchler (withdrawn)

Individuals

- Ted Nugent, musician and gun rights activist
Tom Tancredo (withdrawn)

Political Commentators

- Michelle Malkin, conservative commentator

=== Polling ===
Poll source	Date(s) administered	Sample size	Margin of error	Cynthia Coffman	Greg Lopez	Victor Mitchell	Doug Robinson	Walker Stapleton	Other	Undecided
Magellan Strategies (R)	June 6–7, 2018	593	± 4.0%	–	10%	23%	4%	36%	–	27%
TargetPoint/GQR	March 2018	–	–	7%	–	–	–	15%	16%	62%
Magellan Strategies (R)	February 26–27, 2018	647	± 3.9%	13%	–	5%	8%	26%	9%	39%

Hypothetical polling

Poll source	Date(s) administered	Sample size	Margin of error	George Brauchler	Cynthia Coffman	Victor Mitchell	Doug Robinson	Walker Stapleton	Tom Tancredo	Undecided
University of Colorado Boulder	November 9–15, 2017	250	± 3.5%	4%	6%	1%	1%	8%	25%	54%
Braynard Group (R)	September 26–28, 2017	400	± 3.2%	7%	6%	1%	0.3%	8.5%	22%	54%

=== Results ===
Results by county: Stapleton: 30–40%; 40–50%; 50–60%; 60–70%; Mitchell: 40–50%

Republican primary results
Party	Candidate	Votes	%
Republican	Walker Stapleton	239,415	47.66
Republican	Victor Mitchell	151,365	30.13
Republican	Greg Lopez	66,330	13.20
Republican	Doug Robinson	45,245	9.01
Total votes		502,355	100.0

== Third party and independent candidates ==
=== Candidates ===
==== Declared ====
- Paul Noel Fiorino (Independent), perennial candidate
- Marcus Giavanni (Independent), radio host
- Bill Hammons (Unity Party of America), insurance agent, chairman and founder of the Unity Party of America, and candidate for the U.S. Senate in 2014 and 2016
- Scott Helker (Libertarian)

== General election ==
=== Debates ===
Dates	Location	Polis	Stapleton	Link
October 6, 2018	Grand Junction, Colorado	Participant	Participant	Full debate - C-SPAN

=== Predictions ===
Source	Ranking	As of
The Cook Political Report	Lean D	October 26, 2018
The Washington Post	Lean D	November 5, 2018
FiveThirtyEight	Likely D	November 5, 2018
Rothenberg Political Report	Lean D	November 1, 2018
Sabato's Crystal Ball	Lean D	November 5, 2018
RealClearPolitics	Lean D	November 4, 2018
Daily Kos	Lean D	November 5, 2018
Fox News (Note: The Fox News Midterm Power Rankings uniquely does not contain a category for Safe/Solid races.)	Lean D	November 5, 2018
Politico	Lean D	November 5, 2018
Governing	Lean D	November 5, 2018

=== Endorsements ===
Jared Polis (D)

Organizations

- Colorado Professional Firefighters (CPFF)
- Humane Society
- IBEW Colorado, International Brotherhood of Electrical Workers
- National Cannabis Industry Association
- National Organization for the Reform of Marijuana Laws (NORML)
- Pipefitters Local 208
- Sierra Club
- Southwest Regional Council of Carpenters
- Victory Fund

Federal officials

- Michael Bennet, U.S. Senator (D-CO)
- Diana DeGette, U.S. Representative (CO-1)
- John Lewis, U.S. Representative (GA-5)
- Barack Obama, 44th President of the United States
- Ed Perlmutter, U.S. Representative (CO-7)
- Ken Salazar, former United States Secretary of the Interior and U.S. Senator (D-CO)
- Bernie Sanders, U.S. Senator (I-VT)
- Pat Schroeder, former U.S. Representative (CO-1)

State officials

- John Hickenlooper, Governor of Colorado
- Donna Lynne, Lieutenant Governor of Colorado and former candidate

State Senators

- Polly Baca, former
- Steve Fenberg
- Tom Glass, former, former Mayor of Crested Butte
- Rob Hernandez, former
- Mike Johnston, former
- John Kefalas
- Claire Levy, former
- Chris Romer, former
- Sue Windels, former

State Representatives

- Jeni Ardnt
- Adrienne Benavidez
- Jeff Bridges
- Ed Casso
- Crisanta Duran, speaker
- Mike Foote
- Alec Garnett
- Matt Gray
- Leslie Herod
- Edie Hooton
- Dickey Lee Hullinghorst, former Speaker
- Joe Miklosi
- Angie Paccione
- Cherylin Peniston
- Dianne Primavera
- Jonathan Singer
- Debbie Stafford
- Val Vigil, former, also member of Thornton City Council
- Roger Wilson

County Commissioners

- Jorge Amaya, former, Alamosa County
- Hillary Cooper, San Miguel County Commissioner
- Thomas Davidson, Summit County
- Cindy Domenico, Boulder County
- Deb Gardner, Boulder County
- Dan Gibbs, Summit County
- Eva Henry, Adams County
- Elise Jones, Boulder County
- Tim Mauck, Clear Creek
- Buffie McFadyen, former, Pueblo County
- Garrison Ortiz, Pueblo County
- Sal Pace, Pueblo County
- Karn Stiegelmeier, Summit County
- Will Toor, former, Boulder County

Mayors

- Michael Hancock, Denver
- Suzanne Jones, Boulder
- Jacque Whitsitt, Basalt
- Christine Berg, Lafayette
- Gustavo Reynar, pro tem, Lafayette
- Cecil Gutierrez, Loveland
- Dennis Coombs, former, Longmont
- Bob Muckle, Louisville
- Sean Murphy, Telluride
- Susan Osborne, former, Boulder
- Dr. John Warner, former, Breckenridge
- Tiffany A. Snyder, former, Ward

City Councilors

- Yolanda Avila, Colorado Springs
- Rich Ball, Loveland
- Aaron Brockett, Boulder
- Dean Brookie, Durango
- Ed Brown, Pueblo
- Maria De Cambra, Westminster
- Mack Goodman, Thornton
- Leah Johnson, Loveland
- Kevin Kreeger, Broomfield
- Paul Lopez, Denver
- Ramona Martinez, former, Denver
- Lisa Morzel, Boulder
- Francoise Poinsatte, former, Boulder
- Andy Schultheiss, former, Boulder
- Andrew Shoemaker, Boulder
- Richard Skorman, Colorado Springs
- Kristin Stephen, Fort Collins
- Sam Weaver, Boulder

Others

- Anthony Aragon, LGBTQ leader
- Beverly Breakstone, Summit County Assessor
- Jeff Chostner, Pueblo County District Attorney, former County Commissioner, former State Representative
- Nancy Cronk, Director on the Cunningham Fire Protection District's Board of Directors
- Stan Garnnet, Boulder County District Attorney
- Bob Hullinghorst, former Boulder County Treasurer
- Cary Kennedy, former Colorado state treasurer and candidate
- Dave Levy, Thompson School Board member
- Denise Montague, Thompson School Board member
- Willie Nelson, singer and activist
- Rick Palacio, former Colorado Democratic Party Chairman
- Beverly Benavidez Ryken, former Vice Chair of the Colorado Democratic Party
- Angelika Schroeder, Chairwoman of the State Board of Education
- Jeri Shepherd, DNC member
- John Tayer, former RTD Board member
- Nancy Tellez, former Poudre School Board member
- Phil Weiser, Dean of the University of Colorado Law School and candidate for Attorney General
Walker Stapleton (R)

Presidents of the United States

- George H. W. Bush, 41st President of The United States
- George W. Bush, 43rd President of the United States
- Donald Trump, 45th President of the United States

Vice Presidents of the United States

- Mike Pence, 48th Vice President of the United States

Federal officials

- Ken Buck, U.S. Representative (CO-4)
- Mike Coffman, U.S. Representative (CO-6)
- Cory Gardner, U.S. Senator (R-CO)
- Doug Lamborn, U.S. Representative (CO-5)
- Tom Tancredo, former U.S. Representative (CO-6)
- Scott Tipton, U.S. Representative (CO-3)

State officials

- Jeb Bush, former Governor of Florida

State Senators

- Kevin Grantham, Senate President

State Representatives

- Victor Mitchell, former State Representative (CO-45)
- Patrick Neville, House Minority Leader
- Lang Sias, State Representative (CO-27) and Republican nominee for Lieutenant Governor of Colorado

Local officials

- Darius Allen, Alamosa County Commissioner
- Mark Arndt, Morgan County Commissioner
- Spike Ausmus, Baca County Commissioner
- Jeff Baker, Arapahoe County Commissioner
- Jim Baldwin, Otero County Commissioner
- Ray Beck, Moffat County Commissioner
- Jeff Benson, Jackson County Commissioner
- Brad Blake, La Plata County Commissioner
- Shawn Bolton, Rio Blanco County Commissioner
- Rick Butler, Baca County Commissioner
- Wendy Buxton-Andrade, Prowers County Commissioner
- Phil Chamberland, Gunnison County Commissioner
- Rich Cimino, Grand County Commissioner
- Don Cook, Moffat County Commissioner
- Juie Cozad, Weld County Commissioner
- Glenn Davis, Montrose County Commissioner
- Pete Dawson, Baca County Commissioner
- Marc Dettenrieder, Teller County Commissioner
- Cindy Dozier, Hinsdale County Commissioner
- Keenan Ertel, Montezuma County Commissioner
- Tina Francone, Jefferson County Commissioner
- Mike Freeman, Weld County Commissioner
- Gene Glover, Rio Grande County Commissioner
- Frank Grant, Crowley County Commissioner
- Tom Grasmick, Prowers County Commissioner
- Cari Hermacinski, Routt County Commissioner
- Tom Jankovsky, Garfield County Commissioner
- Barbara Kirkmeyer, Weld County Commissioner
- Lea Ann Laybourn, Washington County Commissioner
- Merit Linke, Grand County Commissioner
- John Martin, Garfield County Commissioner
- Dwayne McFall, Fremont County Commissioner
- Cindy McLoud, Kiowa County Commissioner
- Frank Moe, Moffat County Commissioner
- Steve Moreno, Weld County Commissioner
- Roger Partridge, Douglas County Commissioner
- Tim Payne, Fremont County Commissioner
- Byron Pelton, Logan County Commissioner
- Rod Pelton, Cheyenne County Commissioner
- Dave Potts, Chaffee County Commissioner
- Rose Pugliese, Mesa County Commissioner
- Roger Rash, Montrose County Commissioner
- Jeff Rector, Rio Blanco County Commissioner
- Mike Samson, Garfield County Commissioner
- Nancy Sharpe, Arapahoe County Commissioner
- Karla Shriver, Rio Grande County Commissioner
- Norm Steen, Teller County Commissioner
- Larry Don Suckla, Montezuma County Commissioner
- Don Suppes, Delta County Commissioner
- Libby Szabo, Jefferson County Commissioner
- Lora Thomas, Douglas County Commissioner
- Stan VanderWerf, El Paso County Commissioner
- Mark Waller, El Paso County Commissioner
- Patrick Ward, Cheyenne County Commissioner
- Ramona Weber, Mineral County Commissioner
- Stan Whinnery, Hinsdale County Commissioner
- Si Woodruff, Rio Blanco County Commissioner

Mayors

- Greg Lopez, former Mayor of Parker
- John Suthers, Mayor of Colorado Springs

District attorneys

- Brett Barkey (14th Judicial District)
- Jim Bullock (16th Judicial District)
- Jeff Cheney (9th Judicial District)
- Molly Chilson (11th Judicial District)
- Brittny Lewton (13th Judicial District)
- Dan May (4th Judicial District)
- Cliff Riedel (8th Judicial District)
- Michael J. Rourke (19th Judicial District)
- Dan Rubinstein (21st Judicial District)
- Josh Vogel (15th Judicial District)
- Pete Weir (1st Judicial District)

Sheriffs

- Ronald Bruce, Hinsdale County
- Chad Day, Yuma County
- Bill Elder, El Paso County
- Dave Encinas, Bent County
- Shayne Heap, Elbert County
- KC Hume, Moffat County
- John "Smokey" Kurtz, Crowley County
- Matt Lewis, Mesa County
- Fred McKee, Delta County
- Steve Reams, Weld County
- Brett Schroetlin, Grand County
- Jeff Shrader, Jefferson County
- Justin Smith, Larimer County
- Jon Stivers, Washington County
- David Walcher, Arapahoe County
- Dan Warwick, Sagauche County
- Garrett Wiggins, Routt County
- Sam Zordel, Prowers County

Others

- Doug Robinson, businessman
- Nick Rogers, president of the Denver Police Protective Association

Organizations

- Associated Builders and Contractors
- Americans for Prosperity-Colorado
- Colorado Auto Dealers Association
- Colorado Farm Bureau
- National Federation of Independent Business

Newspapers

- Colorado Springs Gazette
- Durango Herald
- Grand Junction Daily Sentinel
- The Greeley Tribune
- Pueblo Chieftain

=== Polling ===
Poll source	Date(s) administered	Sample size	Margin of error	Jared Polis (D)	Walker Stapleton (R)	Scott Helker (L)	Other	Undecided
Magellan Strategies	October 29–30, 2018	500	± 4.4%	45%	40%	3%	1%	11%
Keating Research/OnSight Public Affairs/Martin Campaigns	October 25–30, 2018	517	± 4.3%	50%	42%	4%	1%	4%
University of Colorado/YouGov	October 12–17, 2018	800	± 3.5%	54%	42%	3%	–	2%
Magellan Strategies	October 8–10, 2018	500	± 4.4%	47%	40%	4%	0%	9%
Keating Research/Magellan Strategies	September 18–20, 2018	600	± 4.0%	47%	40%	1%	0%	11%
Kaiser Family Foundation/CO Health Foundation/SSRS	August 15 – September 19, 2018	1,585	–	44%	33%	–	–	21%
Public Policy Polling (D-CO Democratic Party)	June 27–28, 2018	608	–	47%	40%	–	–	13%
Strategies 360	May 29 – June 6, 2018	500	± 4.4%	42%	37%	–	3%	18%

Hypothetical polling

with Cary Kennedy

Poll source	Date(s) administered	Sample size	Margin of error	Cary Kennedy (D)	Walker Stapleton (R)	Other	Undecided
Strategies 360	May 23 – June 6, 2018	500	± 4.4%	43%	38%	4%	15%

Poll source	Date(s) administered	Sample size	Margin of error	Generic Democrat	Generic Republican	Undecided
Clarity Campaign Labs (D-DAGA)	May 8–10, 2018	883	± 3.3%	52%	37%	11%

with Tom Tancredo

Poll source	Date(s) administered	Sample size	Margin of error	Jared Polis (D)	Tom Tancredo (R)	Other	Undecided
Public Policy Polling (D-RBI/Polis	December 4–5, 2017	770	± 3.5%	46%	38%	–	16%
Braynard Group (R)	September 26–28, 2017	1,000	± 3.2%	25%	25%	3%	47%

Poll source	Date(s) administered	Sample size	Margin of error	Cary Kennedy (D)	Tom Tancredo (R)	Other	Undecided
Public Policy Polling (D-RBI/Polis)	December 4–5, 2017	770	± 3.5%	45%	38%	–	17%
Keating Research (D)	November 9–13, 2017	500	± 4.4%	50%	34%	3%	13%

Poll source	Date(s) administered	Sample size	Margin of error	Mike Johnston (D)	Tom Tancredo (R)	Undecided
Public Policy Polling (D-RBI/Polis)	December 4–5, 2017	770	± 3.5%	43%	39%	18%

Poll source	Date(s) administered	Sample size	Margin of error	Donna Lynne (D)	Tom Tancredo (R)	Undecided
Public Policy Polling (D-RBI/Polis)	December 4–5, 2017	770	± 3.5%	43%	38%	19%

=== Results ===
2018 Colorado gubernatorial election
Party	Candidate	Votes	%	±%
Democratic	Jared Polis	1,348,888	53.42%	+4.12%
Republican	Walker Stapleton	1,080,801	42.80%	−3.15%
Libertarian	Scott Helker	69,519	2.75%	+0.81%
Unity	Bill Hammons	25,854	1.02%	—
Majority		268,087	10.62%	+7.27%
Turnout		2,525,062		
Democratic hold				

==== By county ====
Despite losing the state, Stapleton won 38 of 64 counties.

County	Jared Polis Democratic		Walker Stapleton Republican		Various candidates Other parties		Margin		Total
County	#	%	#	%	#	%	#	%	Total
Adams	93,449	54.57%	69,465	40.57%	8,321	4.86%	23,984	14.00%	171,235
Alamosa	3,039	50.31%	2,696	44.63%	305	5.06%	343	5.68%	6,040
Arapahoe	155,056	57.18%	106,833	39.40%	9,251	3.42%	48,223	17.78%	271,140
Archuleta	2,800	41.32%	3,736	55.13%	240	3.55%	-936	-13.81%	6,776
Baca	331	17.67%	1,454	77.63%	88	4.70%	-1,123	-59.96%	1,873
Bent	638	34.10%	1,094	58.47%	139	7.43%	-456	-24.37%	1,871
Boulder	133,116	75.52%	38,423	21.80%	4,723	2.68%	94,693	53.72%	176,262
Broomfield	21,405	59.21%	13,582	37.57%	1,161	3.22%	7,823	21.64%	36,148
Chaffee	5,461	49.95%	5,018	45.90%	454	4.15%	443	4.05%	10,933
Cheyenne	138	14.08%	809	82.55%	33	3.37%	-671	-68.47%	980
Clear Creek	2,932	54.54%	2,215	41.20%	229	4.26%	717	13.34%	5,376
Conejos	1,652	46.65%	1,756	49.59%	133	3.76%	-104	-2.94%	3,541
Costilla	1,012	62.90%	510	31.70%	87	5.40%	502	31.20%	1,609
Crowley	400	28.82%	888	63.98%	100	7.20%	-488	-35.16%	1,388
Custer	895	31.26%	1,869	65.28%	99	3.46%	-974	-34.02%	2,863
Delta	4,817	31.84%	9,699	64.12%	610	4.04%	-4,882	-32.28%	15,126
Denver	238,762	77.48%	60,151	19.52%	9,245	3.00%	178,611	57.96%	308,158
Dolores	270	22.80%	868	73.31%	46	3.89%	-598	-50.51%	1,184
Douglas	71,573	40.52%	99,123	56.11%	5,945	3.37%	-27,750	-15.59%	176,641
Eagle	13,802	61.82%	7,804	34.95%	720	3.23%	5,998	26.87%	22,326
El Paso	109,154	39.50%	155,006	56.10%	12,132	4.40%	-45,852	-16.60%	276,292
Elbert	3,242	22.18%	10,859	74.28%	517	3.54%	-7,617	-52.10%	14,618
Fremont	6,022	30.75%	12,574	64.21%	985	5.04%	-6,552	-33.46%	19,581
Garfield	11,791	49.01%	11,436	47.53%	831	3.46%	355	1.48%	24,058
Gilpin	1,809	53.71%	1,407	41.77%	152	4.52%	402	11.94%	3,368
Grand	3,596	46.43%	3,837	49.54%	312	4.03%	-241	-3.11%	7,745
Gunnison	5,526	62.90%	2,927	33.32%	332	3.78%	2,599	29.58%	8,785
Hinsdale	218	39.21%	318	57.19%	20	3.60%	-100	-17.98%	556
Huerfano	1,798	49.79%	1,647	45.61%	166	4.60%	151	4.18%	3,611
Jackson	176	22.62%	564	72.49%	38	4.89%	-388	-49.87%	778
Jefferson	166,455	54.40%	127,038	41.51%	12,504	4.09%	39,417	12.89%	305,997
Kiowa	94	12.25%	638	83.18%	35	4.57%	-544	-70.93%	767
Kit Carson	547	17.71%	2,417	78.24%	125	4.05%	-1,870	-60.53%	3,089
La Plata	15,859	55.77%	11,727	41.31%	798	2.92%	4,132	14.46%	28,384
Lake	1,678	58.47%	998	34.77%	194	6.76%	680	23.70%	2,870
Larimer	98,361	54.75%	75,002	41.75%	6,273	3.50%	21,359	13.00%	179,636
Las Animas	2,949	47.26%	3,008	48.21%	282	4.53%	-59	-0.95%	6,239
Lincoln	358	17.26%	1,619	78.06%	97	4.68%	-1,261	-60.80%	2,074
Logan	1,867	21.74%	6,349	73.93%	372	4.33%	-4,482	-52.19%	8,588
Mesa	23,873	35.33%	41,193	60.96%	2,500	3.71%	-17,320	-25.63%	67,566
Mineral	259	43.02%	319	52.99%	24	3.99%	-60	-9.97%	602
Moffat	946	17.59%	4,228	78.63%	203	3.78%	-3,282	-61.04%	5,377
Montezuma	4,403	37.59%	6,933	59.18%	288	3.23%	-2,530	-21.59%	11,714
Montrose	5,855	30.92%	12,466	65.83%	636	3.25%	-6,611	-34.91%	18,937
Morgan	2,844	26.74%	7,329	68.92%	460	4.34%	-4,485	-42.18%	10,633
Otero	2,913	39.16%	4,076	54.80%	449	6.04%	-1,163	-15.64%	7,438
Ouray	1,868	58.52%	1,237	38.75%	87	2.73%	632	19.77%	3,192
Park	3,645	38.28%	5,452	57.25%	425	4.47%	-1,807	-18.97%	9,522
Phillips	397	19.31%	1,583	76.99%	76	3.70%	-1,186	-57.68%	2,056
Pitkin	7,244	73.69%	2,354	23.95%	232	2.36%	4,890	49.74%	9,830
Prowers	1,080	26.02%	2,898	69.83%	172	4.15%	-1,818	-43.81%	4,150
Pueblo	33,674	50.67%	29,545	44.46%	3,237	4.87%	4,129	6.21%	66,456
Rio Blanco	488	15.98%	2,473	81.00%	92	3.02%	-1,985	-65.02%	3,053
Rio Grande	1,912	38.77%	2,795	56.68%	224	4.55%	-883	-17.91%	4,931
Routt	8,163	61.11%	4,787	35.84%	407	3.05%	3,376	25.27%	13,357
Saguache	1,529	56.89%	1,014	37.98%	127	5.13%	515	18.91%	2,670
San Juan	271	60.22%	167	37.11%	12	2.67%	104	23.11%	450
San Miguel	3,047	74.59%	923	22.59%	115	2.82%	2,124	52.00%	4,085
Sedgwick	290	23.98%	859	71.05%	60	4.97%	-569	-47.07%	1,209
Summit	9,499	66.76%	4,243	29.82%	487	3.42%	5,256	36.94%	14,229
Teller	3,986	30.95%	8,409	65.31%	481	3.74%	-4,423	-34.36%	12,876
Washington	294	12.30%	2,004	83.88%	91	3.82%	-1,710	-71.58%	2,389
Weld	46,653	37.21%	72,886	58.13%	5,833	4.66%	-26,233	-20.92%	125,372
Yuma	697	16.99%	3,264	79.57%	141	3.44%	-2,567	-62.58%	4,102
Totals	1,348,888	53.42%	1,080,801	42.80%	95,373	3.78%	268,087	10.62%	2,525,062

==== Counties that flipped from Democratic to Republican ====
- Conejos (largest town: Manassa)

==== Counties that flipped from Republican to Democratic ====
- Chaffee (largest city: Salida)
- Garfield (largest municipality: Glenwood Springs)

==== By congressional district ====
Polis won four of seven congressional districts.

District	Stapleton	Polis	Representative
1st	24%	73%	Diana DeGette
2nd	34%	62%	Joe Neguse
3rd	50%	46%	Scott Tipton
4th	58%	38%	Ken Buck
5th	57%	39%	Doug Lamborn
6th	42%	54%	Jason Crow
7th	38%	57%	Ed Perlmutter
