= Victor Mitchell =

American politician

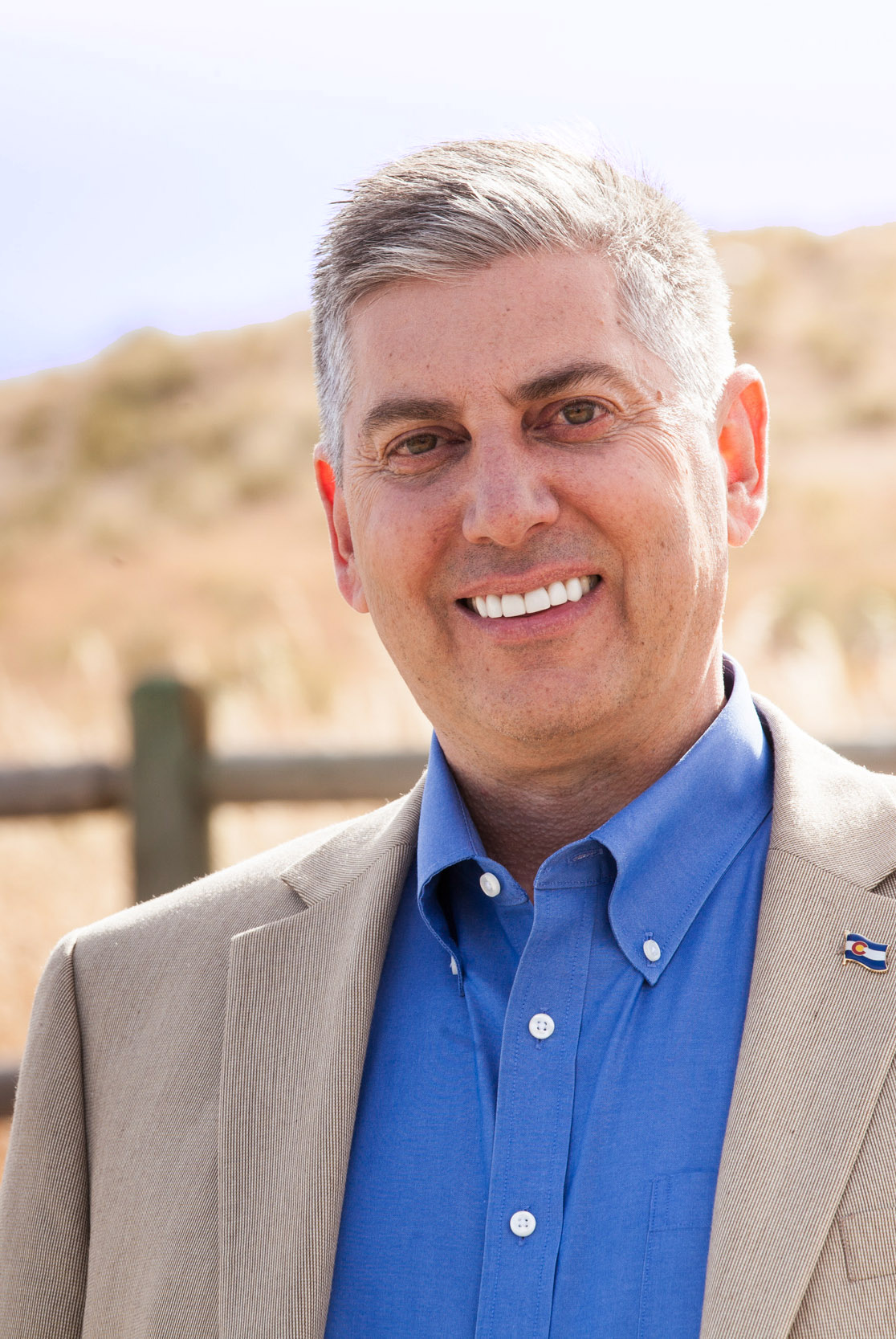
- Mitchell in March 2017

Member of the Colorado House of Representatives from the 45th district
- In office January 10, 2007 – January 7, 2009
- Preceded by: James Sullivan
- Succeeded by: Carole Murray

Personal details
- Born: December 12, 1965 (age 60) Edison, New Jersey, U.S.
- Party: Republican
- Education: San Diego State University (BS); Harvard University (MPA)

Victor Mitchell (born December 12, 1965) is an American businessman and former legislator in Colorado. Since 2008, he has been CEO of Lead Funding, a national real estate lender. Elected to the Colorado House of Representatives as a Republican in 2006, Mitchell represented House District 45, including Teller County and southern Douglas County, Colorado. Mitchell served one term in office and did not stand for re-election in 2008.

In February 2017, Mitchell filed papers to be a candidate for Colorado Governor in 2018. However, he lost in the primary election to fellow Republican Walker Stapleton.

== Early life ==
Born in Edison, New Jersey, Mitchell attended San Diego State University, earning a bachelor's degree in finance in 1988.

== Business career ==
Mitchell's career centered primarily in business starting from the age of 21.

In 1987, while in college, he started a transportation business, and, over the course of his career, founded and was CEO and chairman of five companies: Advantage Advisory Service (1989–2004), Advantage Cellular (1991–1995), Advantage Wireless (1996–2004), Motion Telecom, (2002–2004), and Ricochet Networks (2003–2004). After selling Advantage Cellular to AirTouch (later part of Verizon) in 1995, Mitchell moved to Denver, Colorado, in 1996 and founded Advantage Wireless, a wireless distributor. After expanding to 114 branded locations and thousands of independent retailers across the US, Advantage Wireless was sold to a private equity consortium in 2004. Advantage Wireless, Inc. was named "Colorado Business of the Year" by the Denver Metro Chamber of Commerce in 2000. Mitchell has also been on advisory boards of the Denver Metro Chamber and the Denver Better Business Bureau.

In 2003, Mitchell acquired control of Ricochet Networks, a data service provider that had suffered multiple bankruptcies. The following year, after turning its first annual profit under Mitchell's leadership, Ricochet was acquired by Young Design, Inc. Mitchell was named by the Denver Business Journal as one of their "top 40 under 40" for business executives of Colorado, and was a finalist for Ernst and Young's "Entrepreneur of the Year" recognition. Mitchell also returned to school to earn a Master of Public Administration degree in 2005 from Harvard Kennedy School at Harvard University.

In June 2008, Mitchell founded Lead Funding, a private lender to real estate investors, homebuilders, and developers across the United States. He still is CEO of that firm.

== Political career ==
Politically, Mitchell chaired the Douglas County arm of the political committee opposing Colorado's 2005 Referendum C, and was a director of the Colorado Leadership Program of the Rockies. In 2000, he attended the Capitol Conference in Washington, D.C., on behalf of U.S. Senator Wayne Allard.

=== 2006 election ===
In 2006, Mitchell faced Democrat Linda Constantine in the overwhelmingly Republican district. Mitchell campaigned on his opposition to Referendum C, and on his support for education reform, including support for charter schools.

=== 2007 legislative session ===
During the 2007 legislative session, Mitchell served on the House Education Committee, the House Finance Committee, and the Legislative Audit Committee. Mitchell expressed his frustration with the pace of educational reform as a minority member of the Education Committee, blaming the lack of substantial reform on teachers' unions.

Building upon his work with Project Lifesaver, Mitchell sponsored successful legislation to encourage the project's expansion, including $380,000 in grants to counties to provide tracking bracelets for cognitively impaired people and coordination with law enforcement agencies.

=== 2008 presidential election ===
In 2007, as a state legislator, Mitchell was named a member of the Colorado Legislative Leadership Team for former Massachusetts governor Mitt Romney's presidential campaign. Shortly before Super Tuesday in February, he was announced as a Douglas County chair for Romney's campaign. After Romney dropped out of the presidential race a few days later, Mitchell offered support for Arizona Sen. John McCain.

=== 2008 legislative session ===
In the 2008 session of the Colorado General Assembly, Mitchell sat on the House Business Affairs and Labor Committee and the Legislative Audit Committee.

After joining with moderate Republicans to criticize an executive order issued by Colorado Governor Bill Ritter allowing collective bargaining for state workers, Mitchell unsuccessfully attempted to amend a Republican proposal for punishing striking public employees to moderate fines; both his amendment and the Republican version of the proposal failed in committee. Mitchell criticized the Democratic version of the bill for not having sufficiently high penalties for striking state employees.

Mitchell has also proposed legislation to require students to pass a high school proficiency exam before graduating, and to enhance the ability of the state to inspect public school buildings by giving the Division of Oil and Public Safety the power to delegate building inspections to other parties, a measure which passed the state house.

=== Retiring from legislature ===
Citing business responsibilities and frustration with advancing legislation while a member of the minority party in the legislature, Mitchell announced in January 2008 that he did not intend to seek re-election to a second term. Carole Murray succeeded him in the District 45 House seat.

=== 2011 Election ===
Mitchell formed and self-funded a campaign committee–Save Colorado Jobs–to oppose Democratic State Senator Rollie Heath's Prop 103 that would have raised both the state sales and income taxes to help fund education. It would have been the largest tax increase in Colorado history at that time. Prop 103 was defeated by a wide margin, 64% NO to 36% YES.

=== 2018 Election ===
Mitchell unsuccessful ran for Governor of Colorado in the 2018 Colorado gubernatorial election. During the primaries, he attempted to sell himself as a "serial entrepreneur". He was defeated by a large margin in the Republican primaries by Walker Stapleton, with 151,585 votes to 239,861.

== Personal life ==
Currently a resident of Longboat Key, Florida, Mitchell has three children, Lauren a New York City educator, David a United States Army Lieutenant, and Emily, a college student.
