= 2014 Colorado elections =

A general election was held in the U.S. state of Colorado on November 4, 2014. All of Colorado's executive officers were up for election as well as a United States Senate seat and all of Colorado's seven seats in the United States House of Representatives. Primary elections were held on June 24, 2014.

== Governor and lieutenant governor ==
Incumbent Democratic Governor John Hickenlooper and his Lieutenant Governor Joseph Garcia ran for re-election to a second term in office. They were unopposed for the Democratic nomination In Colorado, gubernatorial candidates pick their running mates and they are elected on the same ticket.

The Republicans nominee was former U.S. Representative and nominee for governor in 2006 Bob Beauprez, whose running mate was Douglas County Commissioner Jill Repella. He defeated Secretary of State of Colorado Scott Gessler, former Minority Leader of the Colorado Senate Mike Kopp and former U.S. Representative and Constitution Party nominee for governor in 2010 Tom Tancredo in the primary election.

Libertarian Matthew Hess and his running mate Brandon Young, Greens Bill Bartlett and Harry Hempy and Independents Mike Dunafon, Mayor of Glendale, and Jim Rundberg also ran.

2014 Colorado gubernatorial election
Party	Candidate	Votes	%
Democratic	John Hickenlooper/Joseph Garcia	1,006,433	49.30
Republican	Bob Beauprez/Jill Repella	938,195	45.95
Libertarian	Matthew Hess/Brandon Young	39,590	1.94
Green	Harry Hempy/Scott Olson	27,391	1.34
Independent	Mike Dunafon/Robin Roberts	24,042	1.18
Independent	Paul Fiorino/Charles Whitley	5,923	0.29
Total votes		2,041,574	100.0
Democratic hold			

== Attorney General ==
Incumbent Republican Attorney General John Suthers was term-limited form seeking a third consecutive term. Republican nominee Chief Deputy Attorney General Cynthia Coffman defeated Democratic nominee former deputy attorney general Don Quick with 51.4% of the vote.

=== Results ===
2014 Colorado Attorney General election
Party	Candidate	Votes	%
Republican	Cynthia Coffman	1,002,626	51.43
Democratic	Don Quick	826,182	42.38
Libertarian	David Williams	120,745	6.19
Total votes		1,949,553	100.0
Republican hold			

== Secretary of State ==
2014 Colorado Secretary of State election
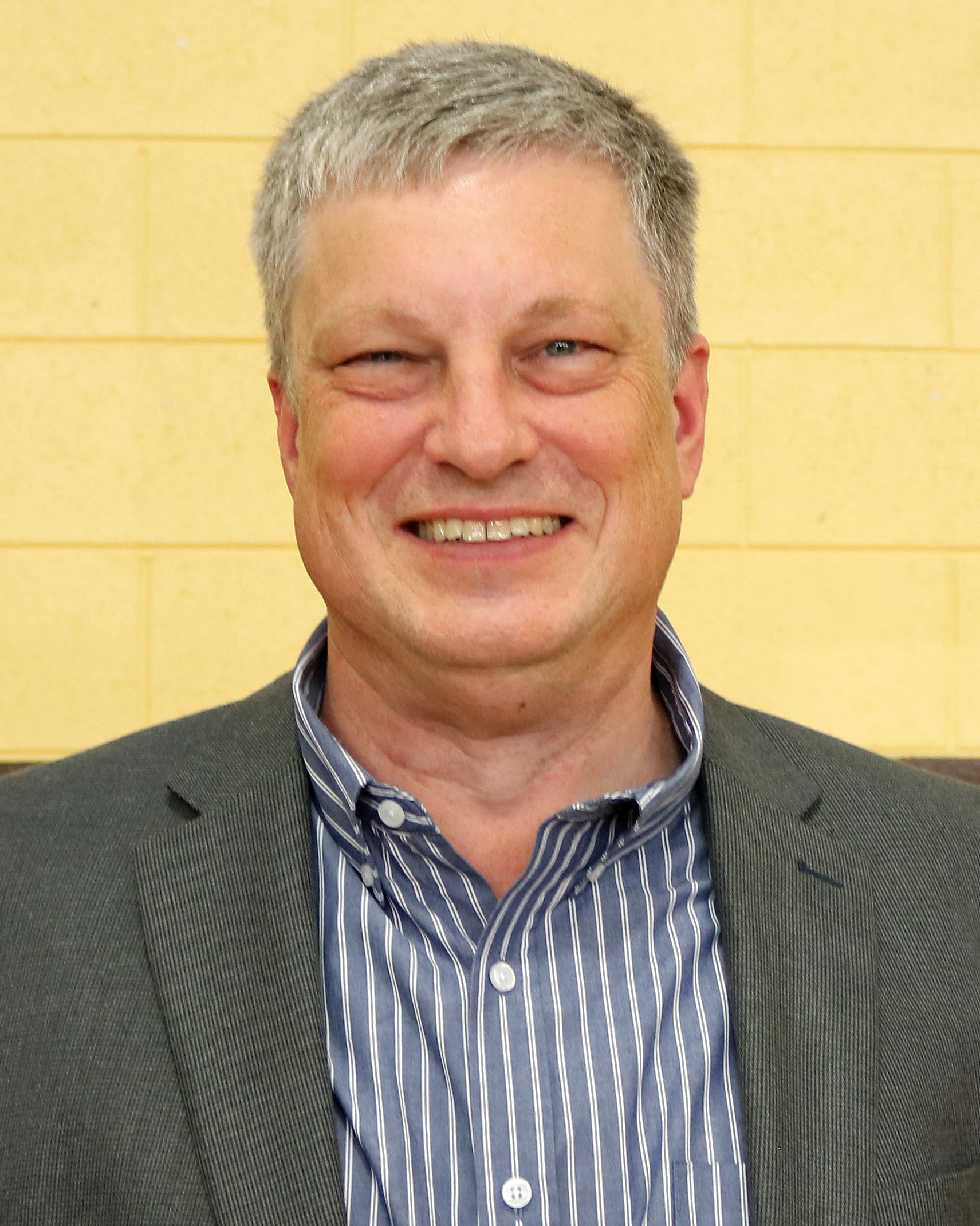

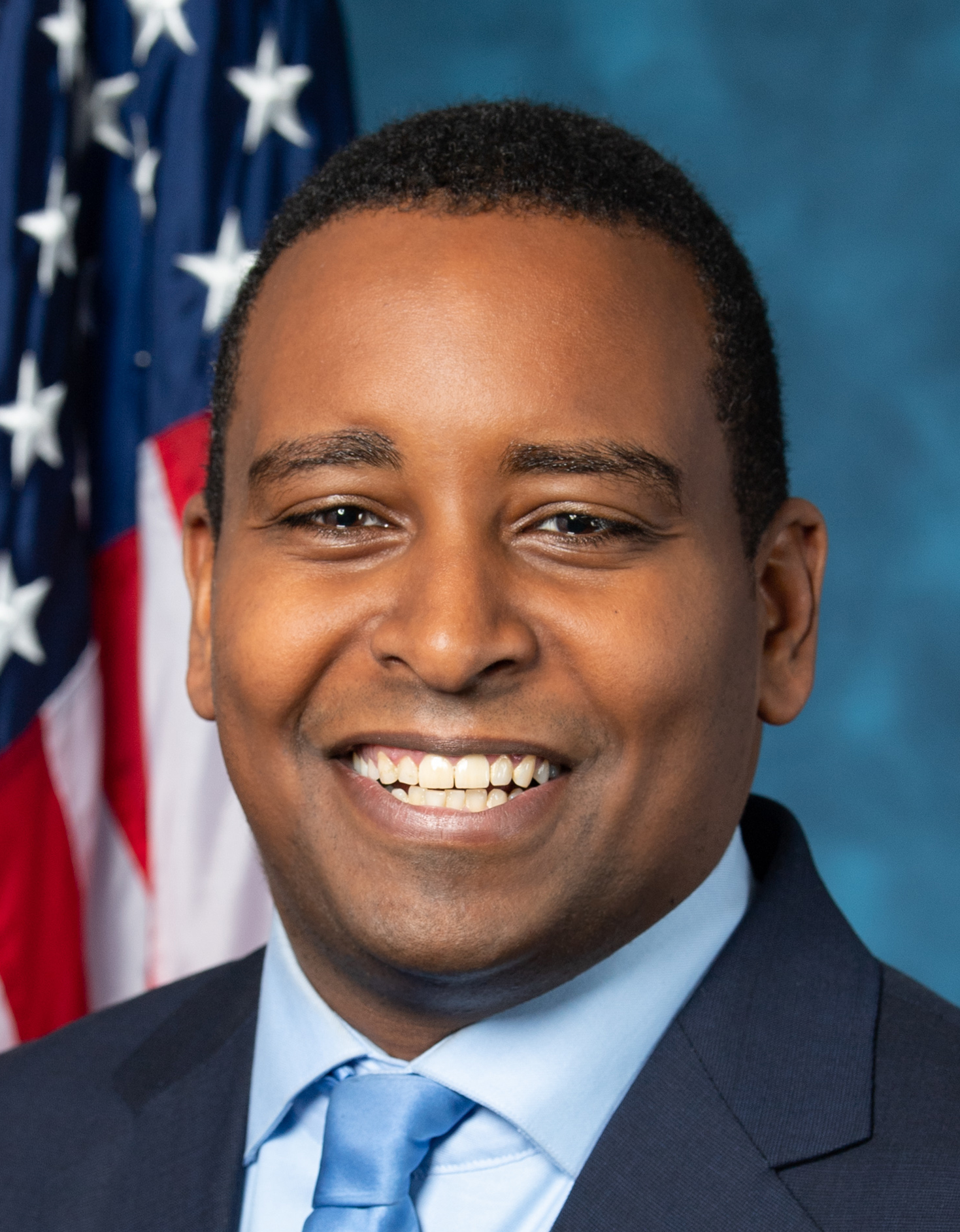
Nominee	Wayne W. Williams	Joe Neguse
Party	Republican	Democratic
Popular vote	932,588	886,043
Percentage	47.34%	44.98%
- Williams: 40–50% 50–60% 60–70% 70–80% 80–90% Neguse: 40–50% 50–60% 60–70%
Secretary of State before election
Scott Gessler
Republican
Elected Secretary of State
Wayne W. Williams
Republican

Incumbent Republican Secretary of State Scott Gessler did not run for re-election to a second term in office. He instead ran unsuccessfully for governor. As of 2026, this was the last time a Republican was elected Secretary of State of Colorado.

=== Republican primary ===
El Paso County Clerk & Recorder Wayne W. Williams was the Republican nominee. Arapahoe County Commissioner Nancy Doty considered running, but decided against it.

Republican primary results
Party	Candidate	Votes	%
Republican	Wayne W. Williams	321,509	100

=== Democratic primary ===
Regent of the University of Colorado Joe Neguse was the Democratic nominee. Former Majority Leader of the Colorado Senate and nominee for secretary of state in 2006 Ken Gordon had also declared his candidacy in December 2012, though it was unclear if he was continuing in the race after Neguse entered in June 2013. Gordon died of a heart attack in December 2013. Former state senator Angela Giron also considered running for the Democratic nomination, but she decided against it.

Democratic primary results
Party	Candidate	Votes	%
Democratic	Joe Neguse	195,951	100

=== American Constitution primary ===
Amanda Campbell, the American Constitution Party nominee for the State House in 2008 and for secretary of state in 2010 ran again.

American Constitution primary results
Party	Candidate	Votes	%
Constitution	Amanda Campbell	925	100

=== General election ===
==== Polling ====
Poll source	Date(s) administered	Sample size	Margin of error	Wayne W. Williams (R)	Joe Neguse (D)	Amanda Campbell (ACP)	David Schambach (L)	Undecided
Public Policy Polling	November 1–2, 2014	739	± 3.6%	43%	37%	5%	3%	11%
SurveyUSA	October 27–29, 2014	618	± 4%	43%	39%	—	7%	11%
Suffolk University	October 18–21, 2014	500	± 4.4%	35%	28%	2%	4%	31%
Public Policy Polling	October 16–19, 2014	778	± 3.5%	36%	31%	10%	3%	20%
Gravis Marketing	October 16, 2014	695	± 4%	39%	37%	—	8%	15%
Suffolk University	September 9–16, 2014	500	± 4.4%	35%	29%	5%	3%	27%
Public Policy Polling	July 17–20, 2014	653	± 3.8%	35%	27%	—	—	38%
Gravis Marketing	July 8–10, 2014	1,106	± 3%	42%	39%	—	7%	13%

==== Results ====
2014 Colorado Secretary of State election
Party	Candidate	Votes	%
Republican	Wayne W. Williams	932,588	47.34
Democratic	Joe Neguse	886,043	44.98
Constitution	Amanda Campbell	77,790	3.95
Libertarian	David Schambach	73,413	3.73
Total votes		1,969,834	100
Republican hold			

== State Treasurer ==
2014 Colorado State Treasurer election
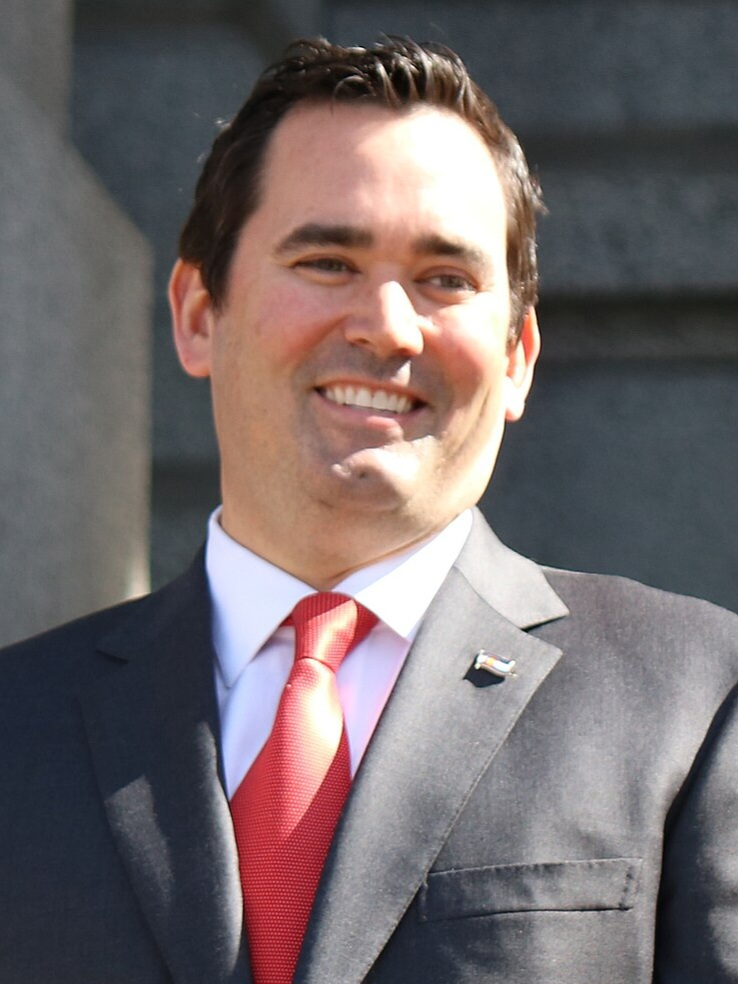

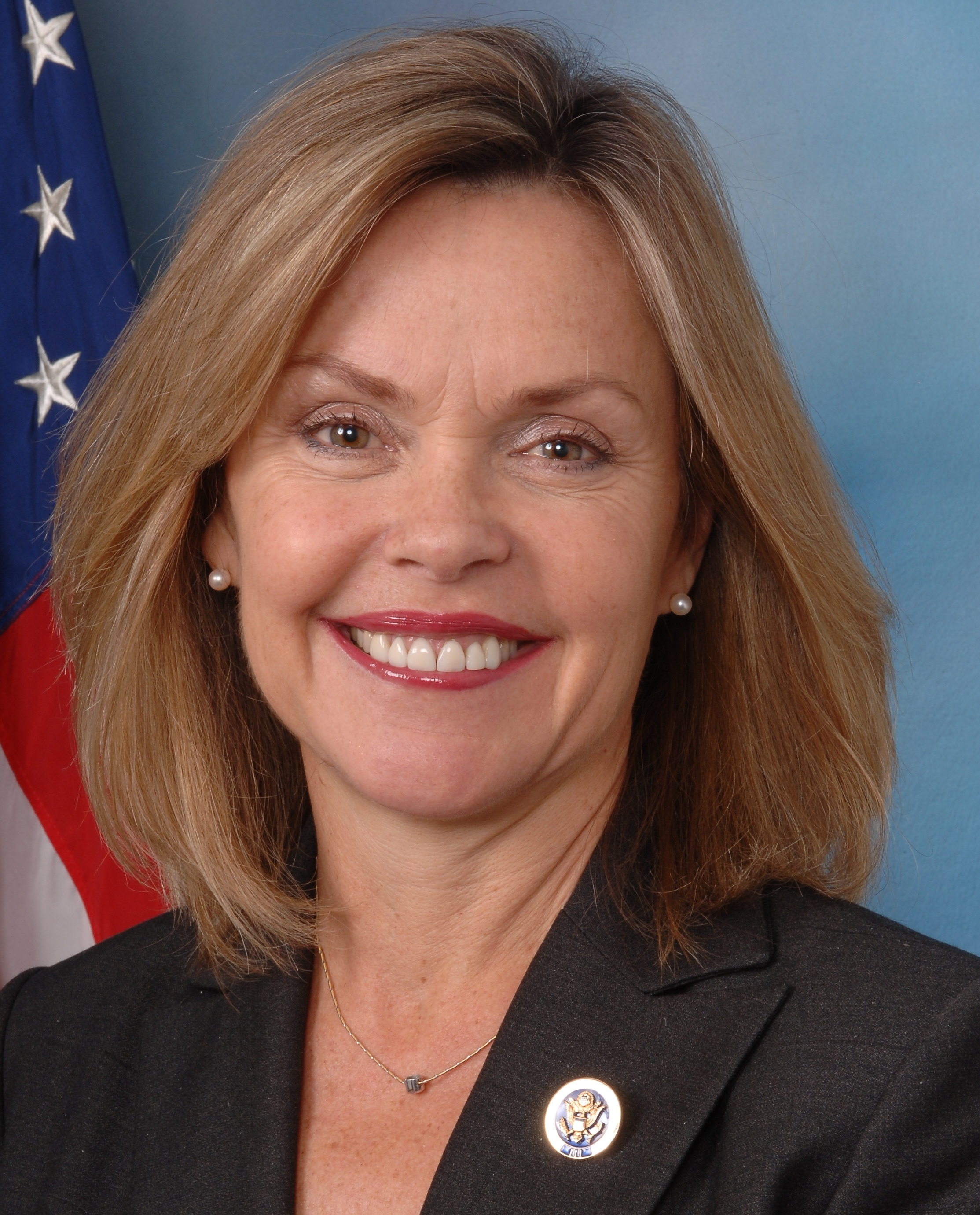

Nominee	Walker Stapleton	Betsy Markey	David Jurist
Party	Republican	Democratic	Libertarian
Popular vote	979,281	882,437	101,826
Percentage	49.87%	44.94%	5.19%
- Stapleton: 40–50% 50–60% 60–70% 70–80% Markey: 40–50% 50–60% 60–70%
Treasurer before election
Walker Stapleton
Republican
Elected Treasurer
Walker Stapleton
Republican

Incumbent Republican state Treasurer Walker Stapleton ran for re-election to a second term in office. As of 2026, this was the last time a Republican was elected Colorado state treasurer.

=== Republican primary ===
Stapleton was unopposed for the Republican nomination.

Republican primary results
Party	Candidate	Votes	%
Republican	Walker Stapleton	323,862	100

=== Democratic primary ===
Former U.S. Representative and former Assistant Secretary for Intergovernmental Affairs in the United States Department of Homeland Security Betsy Markey was the Democratic nominee. Pat Quinn, the outgoing mayor of Broomfield, had also declared his candidacy in June 2013, but he withdrew from the race in November 2013.

Democratic primary results
Party	Candidate	Votes	%
Democratic	Betsy Markey	203,537	100

=== General election ===
==== Polling ====
Poll source	Date(s) administered	Sample size	Margin of error	Walker Stapleton (R)	Betsy Markey (D)	David Jurist (L)	Undecided
Public Policy Polling	November 1–2, 2014	739	± 3.6%	47%	41%	4%	8%
SurveyUSA	October 27–29, 2014	618	± 4%	46%	41%	5%	8%
Public Policy Polling	October 16–19, 2014	778	± 3.5%	42%	40%	6%	12%
Gravis Marketing	October 16, 2014	695	± 4%	43%	41%	8%	8%
Public Policy Polling	July 17–20, 2014	653	± 3.8%	43%	33%	—	24%
Gravis Marketing	July 8–10, 2014	1,106	± 3%	44%	41%	6%	9%
A.L.G. Research (Note: Internal poll for the Pat Quinn campaign.)	June 27–30, 2013	400	± ?	41%	40%	—	19%

Hypothetical polling

Poll source	Date(s) administered	Sample size	Margin of error	Walker Stapleton (R)	Pat Quinn (D)	Other	Undecided
A.L.G. Research	June 27–30, 2013	400	± ?	41%	38%	—	21%

==== Results ====
2014 Colorado State Treasurer election
Party	Candidate	Votes	%
Republican	Walker Stapleton (incumbent)	979,281	49.87
Democratic	Betsy Markey	882,437	44.94
Libertarian	David Jurist	101,826	5.19
Total votes		1,963,544	100.0
Republican hold			

== United States Senate ==
Incumbent Democratic senator Mark Udall unsuccessfully ran for re-election to a second term in office.

U.S. Representative Cory Gardner was the Republican nominee, businessman Gaylon Kent was the Libertarian nominee, Unity Party of America founder and National Chairman Bill Hammons is the Unity Party nominee, and neurosurgeon and conservative activist Steve Shogan ran as an independent.

United States Senate election in Colorado, 2014
Party	Candidate	Votes	%
Republican	Cory Gardner	983,891	48.21
Democratic	Mark Udall (incumbent)	944,203	46.26
Libertarian	Gaylon Kent	52,876	2.59
Independent	Steve Shogan	29,472	1.44
Independent	Raúl Acosta	24,151	1.18
Unity	Bill Hammons	6,427	0.32
Total votes		2,041,020	100.0
Republican gain from Democratic			

== United States House of Representatives ==
All of Colorado's seven seats in the United States House of Representatives were up for election in 2014.

== State Board of Education ==
Three seats on the Colorado State Board of Education were up for election.

District	Party	Incumbent	Status	Party	Candidate	Votes	%
1	Democratic	Elaine Gantz Berman	not running	Democratic	Valentina Flores	190,658	100%
3	Republican	Marcia Neal	running	Republican	Marcia Neal	150,292	56.14%
3	Republican	Marcia Neal	running	Democratic	Henry Roman	117,407	43.86%
7	Democratic	Jane Goff	running	Democratic	Jane Goff	137,091	53.46%
7	Democratic	Jane Goff	running	Republican	Laura Boggs	119,353	46.54%

Source: Colorado Secretary of State

== CU Board of Regents ==
Three seats on the University of Colorado Board of Regents were up for election.

District	Party	Incumbent	Status	Party	Candidate	Votes	%
2	Democratic	Joe Neguse	not running	Democratic	Linda Shoemaker	166,449	51.45%
2	Democratic	Joe Neguse	not running	Republican	Kim McGahey	133,631	41.31%
2	Democratic	Joe Neguse	not running	Libertarian	Daniel Ong	23,436	7.24%
6	Republican	Jim Geddes	not running	Republican	John Carson	142,886	55.52%
6	Republican	Jim Geddes	not running	Democratic	Naquetta Ricks	114,473	44.48%
7	Democratic	Irene Griego	running	Democratic	Irene Griego	140,202	59.47%
7	Democratic	Irene Griego	running	Libertarian	Steve Golter	95,558	40.53%

Source: Colorado Secretary of State

== State legislature ==
=== State Senate ===
18 of the 35 seats in the Colorado State Senate were on the ballot. Republicans flipped two seats while Democrats flipped one, resulting in a Republican control of the chamber.

=== State House of Representatives ===
All 65 seats in the Colorado House of Representatives were up for election. Democrats maintained a narrow majority despite losing three seats to the Republicans.

2014 Colorado House of Representatives election
Party	Before	After	Change
Democratic	37	34	▼3
Republican	28	31	▲3
Total	65		

== State judiciary ==
=== State Supreme Court ===
Two justices on the Colorado Supreme Court faced retention.

==== Justice Boatright retention ====
Results by county For: 50–60%; 60–70%; 70–80%; Against: 50–60%

Brian Boatright was appointed by Governor Hickenlooper in 2011 to succeed Alex Martinez.

Colorado Supreme Court Justice Boatright retention election
Choice	Votes	%
For	1,072,580	68.58
Against	491,362	31.42
Total	1,563,942	100.00
Source: Colorado Secretary of State

==== Justice Márquez retention ====
Results by county For: 50–60%; 60–70%; 70–80%; 80–90%; Against: 50–60%

Monica Márquez was appointed by governor Bill Ritter in 2010 as an associate justice to succeed Mary Mullarkey.

Colorado Supreme Court Justice Márquez retention election
Choice	Votes	%
For	1,061,694	67.81
Against	504,044	32.19
Total	1,565,738	100.00
Source: Colorado Secretary of State

=== Court of Appeals ===
Two judges on the Colorado Court of Appeals faced retention.

==== Judge Loeb retention ====
Results by county For: 50–60%; 60–70%; 70–80%; 80–90%

Alan Loeb was appointed by governor Bill Owens in 2003 to succeed Claus Hume.

Colorado Court of Appeals Judge Loeb retention election
Choice	Votes	%
For	1,054,428	68.91
Against	475,687	31.09
Total	1,530,115	100.00
Source: Colorado Secretary of State

==== Judge Fox retention ====
Results by county For: 50–60%; 60–70%; 70–80%

Terry Fox was appointed by governor Ritter in 2011 to succeed Sean Connelly.

Colorado Court of Appeals Judge Fox retention election
Choice	Votes	%
For	1,022,315	66.38
Against	517,691	33.62
Total	1,540,006	100.00
Source: Colorado Secretary of State

== Ballot measures ==
Four statewide measures appeared on the ballot in 2014.

2014 Colorado ballot measures
Name	Description	Votes				Type
Name	Description	Yes	%	No	%	Type
Amendment 67	Redefines human fetuses as "persons" in the Colorado Criminal Code and Colorado Wrongful Death Act.	702,544	35.13	1,297,299	64.87	Citizen-initiated constitutional amendment
Amendment 68	Establishes a K–12 education fund to be funded by expanded limited gaming at horse racetracks.	597,239	29.62	1,419,095	70.38	Citizen-initiated constitutional amendment
Proposition 104	Requires open school board meetings for collective bargaining negotiations.	1,364,747	70.09	582,473	29.91	Citizen-initiated state statute
Proposition 105	Mandates labeling of certain foodstuffs that contain GMOs.	694,738	34.53	1,317,288	65.47	Citizen-initiated state statute
Source: Colorado Secretary of State

Results by county

Amendment 67 results by county
No:
- 80–90%
- 70–80%
- 60–70%
- 50–60%
Yes:
- 50–60%

Amendment 68 results by county
No:
- 80–90%
- 70–80%
- 60–70%
- 50–60%

Proposition 104 results by county
Yes:
- 70–80%
- 60–70%
- 50–60%
No:
- 50–60%

Proposition 105 results by county
No:
- >90%
- 80–90%
- 70–80%
- 60–70%
- 50–60%
Yes:
- 60–70%
- 50–60%
