= Marguerite Salazar =

American government official

Superintendent of the New Mexico Regulation and Licensing Department
- In office January 2019 – November 2022
- Governor: Michelle Lujan Grisham

Insurance Commissioner of Colorado
- In office August 19, 2013 – 2017
- Governor: John Hickenlooper
- Succeeded by: Michael Conway

Personal details
- Education: Adams State University (BA, MA)

Marguerite Salazar was an American government official serving as the superintendent of the New Mexico Regulation and Licensing Department from January 2019 until her death in November 2022. Salazar was previously the insurance commissioner of Colorado from July 2013 to 2017 and the chief regulator of Colorado from July 2017 to January 2019.

== Education ==
Salazar earned a Bachelor of Arts and Master of Arts in counseling psychology from Adams State University.

== Career ==
For twenty years, Salazar served as the president and CEO of health clinic provider Valley-Wide Health Systems. She was appointed by Barack Obama as the Region VIII director of the United States Department of Health and Human Services, where she was responsible for implementing the Affordable Care Act in six states.

=== Colorado ===
On July 22, 2013, Salazar was appointed to be insurance commissioner of the Colorado Division of Insurance, effective August 19 of that year. Among her first challenges were to implement Affordable Care Act stages, and managing the 2013 wildfire season. Salazar found that Colorado had the highest Affordable Care Act rates in the nation, so she re-drew the district lines in an attempt to mitigate rate disparity. As Insurance Commissioner, Salazar was reluctant to expand regulations by creating new Division of Insurance rules, even where she found rules inadequate, in recognition of the political climate of Colorado.

She was appointed the chief regulator of Colorado by Governor John Hickenlooper in July 2017. She has served on the board of governors for Colorado State University.

=== New Mexico ===
In January 2019, Salazar left her position in Colorado and was appointed as the superintendent of the New Mexico Regulation and Licensing Department by Governor Michelle Lujan Grisham. In her new position, Salazar administers the regulation of local lending institutions, the credential for many professions, issuing building permits, protecting consumers from securities fraud, along with other duties.
