= Joe Neguse =

American politician (born 1984)

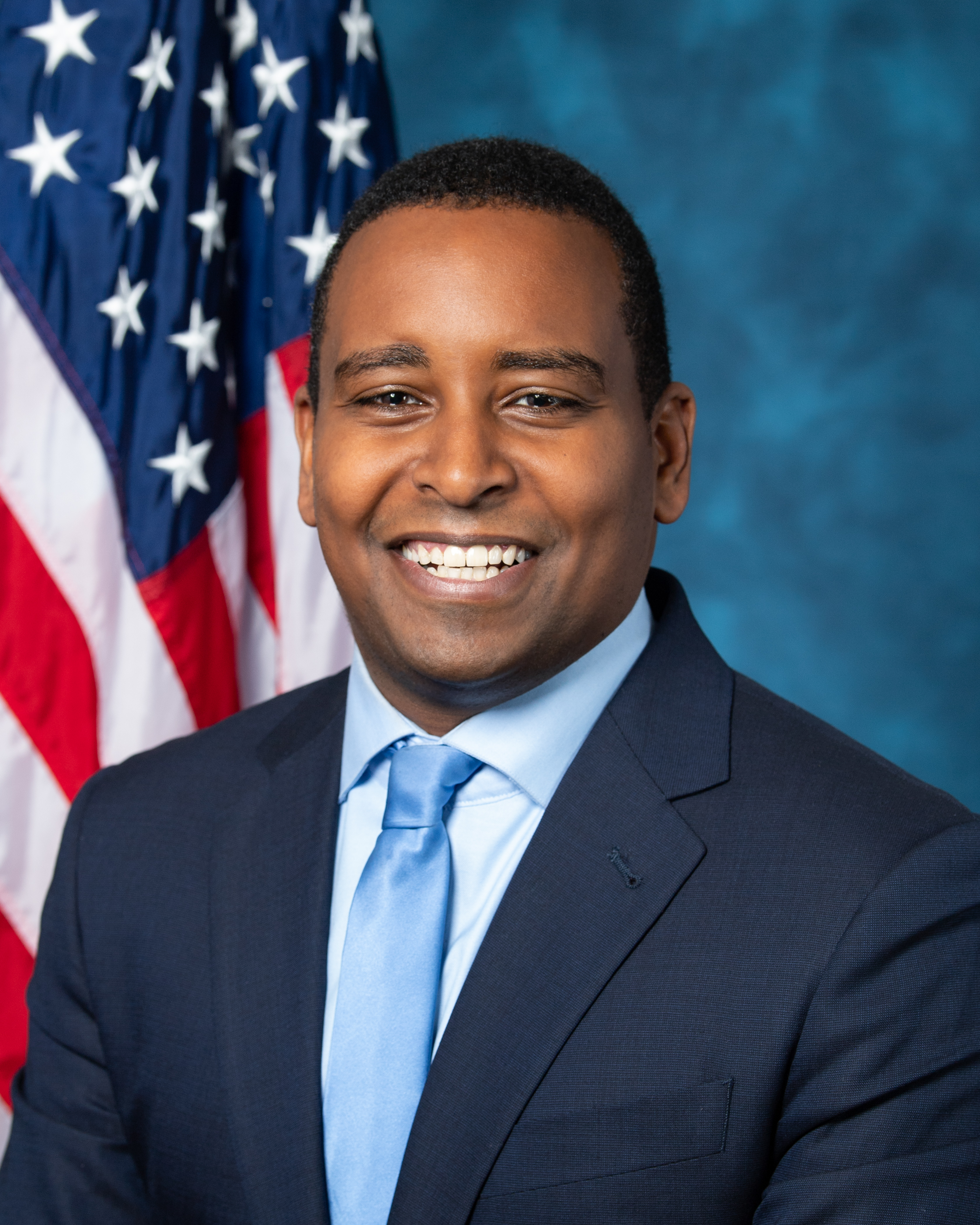
- Official portrait, 2018

Assistant Speaker-designate of the United States House of Representatives
- Assuming office January 3, 2027
- Leader: Hakeem Jeffries
- Succeeding: Vacant (Note: Katherine Clark last served as assistant speaker in 2023.)

House Assistant Democratic Leader
- Incumbent
- Assumed office March 20, 2024
- Leader: Hakeem Jeffries
- Preceded by: Jim Clyburn

Chair of the House Democratic Policy and Communications Committee
- In office January 3, 2021 – March 20, 2024
- Leader: Nancy Pelosi; Hakeem Jeffries
- Preceded by: David Cicilline
- Succeeded by: Debbie Dingell

Member of the U.S. House of Representatives from Colorado's 2nd district
- Incumbent
- Assumed office January 3, 2019
- Preceded by: Jared Polis

Executive Director of the Colorado Department of Regulatory Agencies
- In office June 2015 – June 2017
- Governor: John Hickenlooper
- Preceded by: Barbara Kelley
- Succeeded by: Marguerite Salazar

Personal details
- Born: May 13, 1984 (age 42) Bakersfield, California, U.S.
- Party: Democratic
- Spouse: Andrea Jimenez (m. 2015)
- Children: 2
- Education: University of Colorado, Boulder (BA, JD)
- Website: House website Campaign website
- Neguse's voice Neguse on objections to the 2020 Electoral College Results; Recorded January 6, 2021

Joseph D. Neguse (/nəˈɡuːs/ nə-GOOSS; born May 13, 1984) is an American lawyer and politician serving as the U.S. representative for Colorado's 2nd congressional district since 2019. A member of the Democratic Party, he was a regent of the University of Colorado from 2008 to 2015. Neguse is the first Eritrean-American elected to the United States Congress and Colorado's first black member of Congress. Neguse has served as House assistant Democratic leader since 2024.

== Early life and education ==
Neguse's parents immigrated to the United States from Eritrea. They met while living in Bakersfield, California, where they married and had Joe and his younger sister. The family moved to Colorado when he was six years old. After living in Aurora and Littleton, the family settled in Highlands Ranch.

Neguse graduated from ThunderRidge High School. He then graduated from the University of Colorado Boulder, where he served as student body president, with a bachelor's degree in political science and economics summa cum laude in 2005 and then from the University of Colorado Law School, with his Juris Doctor in 2009.

== Earlier career ==
While he was a student, Neguse founded New Era Colorado, an organization to get young people involved in politics. He worked at the Colorado State Capitol as an assistant to Andrew Romanoff when Romanoff was a member of the Colorado House of Representatives. In 2008 Neguse was elected to the Regents of the University of Colorado, representing Colorado's 2nd congressional district, becoming the second African American in Colorado history to serve on the Board of Regents.

Neguse ran for Secretary of State of Colorado in 2014, losing to Wayne W. Williams, 47.5% to 44.9%. In June 2015, Governor John Hickenlooper appointed Neguse the executive director of the Colorado Department of Regulatory Agencies (DORA), making him one of the youngest state cabinet officials in the country.

In 2017, Neguse resigned from DORA to run in the 2018 elections for the United States House of Representatives in Colorado's 2nd congressional district, seeking to succeed Jared Polis, who successfully ran for governor of Colorado. He also joined the law firm Snell & Wilmer, working in administrative law.

== U.S. House of Representatives ==
=== Elections ===
==== 2018 ====
On June 13, 2017, Neguse announced he would run for the Democratic nomination after incumbent U.S. representative Jared Polis announced he would not run for reelection and would run for governor of Colorado. In the June 26, 2018, Democratic primary—the real contest in this heavily Democratic district—Neguse faced businessman and former Boulder County Democratic Party chairman Mark Williams. Neguse defeated Williams with 65.7% of the vote, winning all 10 counties in the district.

Neguse then defeated the Republican nominee, businessman Peter Yu, in the November 6 general election, receiving 60.2% of the vote, and winning all but two counties. Neguse became the first Black American to represent Colorado in the House.

==== 2020 ====
He was reelected in 2020 with 61.5% of the vote, defeating Republican Charles Winn.

==== 2022 ====
Neguse was reelected in 2022 with 70.7% of the vote, defeating Republican nominee Marshall Dawson.

==== 2024 ====
Neguse was reelected in 2024 with 68.4% of the vote, defeating Republican nominee Marshall Dawson in a rematch.

=== Tenure ===
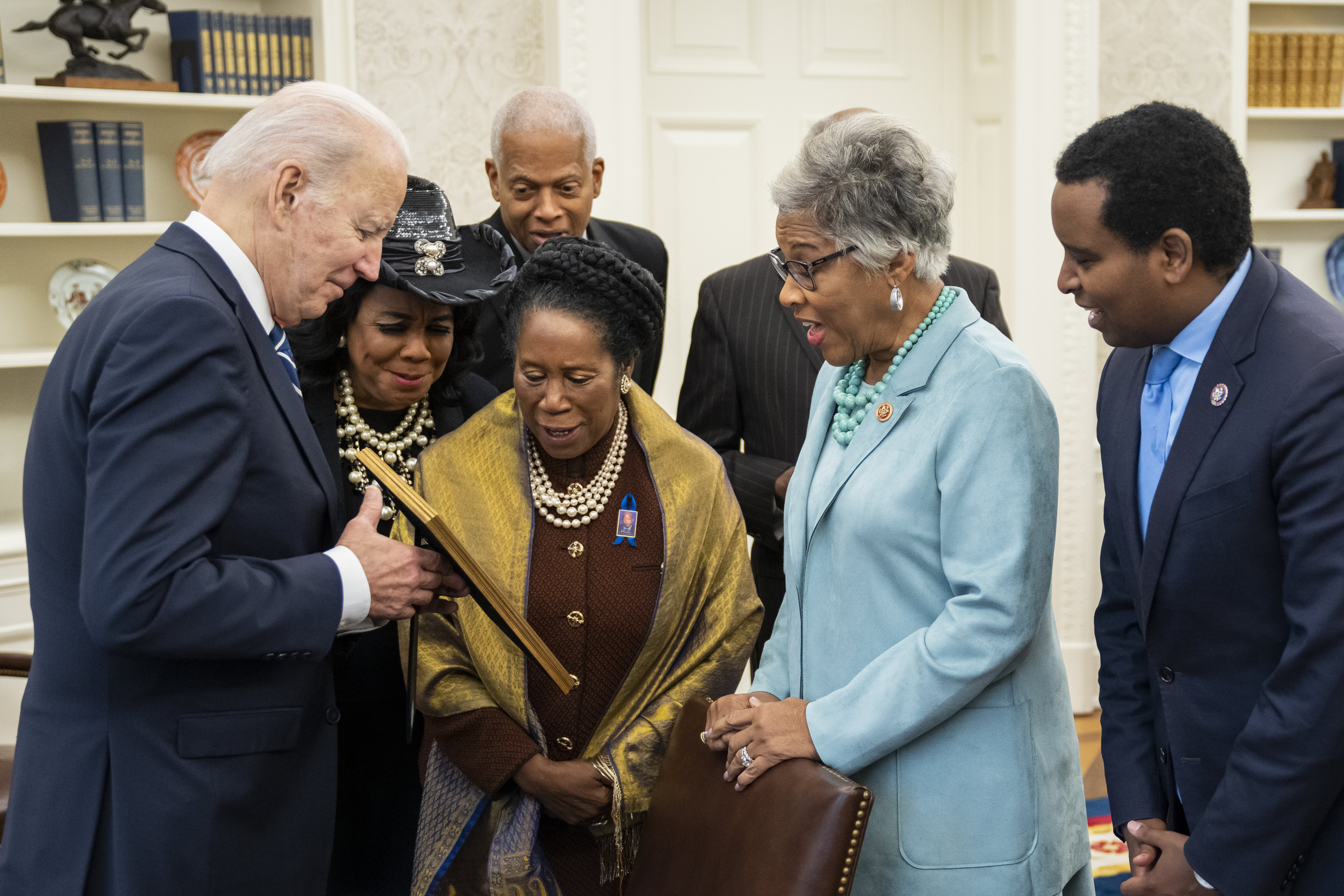
Neguse with President Joe Biden and members of the Congressional Black Caucus in the Oval Office in 2022

Shortly after his election to the House, Neguse was elected by his House colleagues to serve in House leadership as the co-freshman representative.

Neguse voted for the impeachment of Donald Trump in 2019. In 2020, he was named the most bipartisan member of the Colorado congressional delegation by the Lugar Center.

In November 2020, Neguse's House colleagues unanimously elected him to serve as a co-chair of the Democratic Policy and Communications Committee, the number eight position in House Democratic leadership. In December 2022, he was elected chair, the fifth-highest position in the Democratic Party leadership.

On January 12, 2021, Speaker Pelosi appointed Neguse as a House impeachment manager (prosecutor) for Trump's second impeachment trial, making him the youngest impeachment manager in U.S. history. During the trial, Neguse and his fellow House impeachment managers built their case by drawing connections between Trump's false claims of election fraud in the 2020 election and the January 6 United States Capitol attack. In the end, the Senate voted to acquit Trump, but with seven Republican senators voting to convict, it was the most bipartisan impeachment trial in U.S. history.

On March 20, 2024, Neguse was elected House assistant Democratic leader, succeeding Jim Clyburn.

The Center for Effective Lawmaking at Vanderbilt University and the University of Virginia ranked him as the second-most effective House Democrat in the 118th Congress (2023–25). Neguse’s questioning of Kristi Noem during a House Committee Judiciary Committee hearing on March 4, 2026 was credited, in-part, with leading to her removal the next day as Secretary of Homeland Security.

=== Committee assignments ===
For the 119th Congress:

- Committee on Natural Resources
  - Subcommittee on Federal Lands (Ranking Member)
  - Subcommittee on Water, Wildlife and Fisheries
- Committee on Rules
  - Subcommittee on Legislative and Budget Process
- Committee on the Judiciary
  - Subcommittee on Courts, Intellectual Property, and the Internet
  - Subcommittee on the Administrative State, Regulatory Reform, and Antitrust

=== Caucus memberships ===
- Black Maternal Health Caucus
- Congressional Black Caucus
- Pro-Choice Caucus
- Congressional Progressive Caucus
- House Gun Violence Prevention Task Force (vice chair)
- Congressional Equality Caucus
- Congressional Cannabis Caucus
- Congressional Solar Caucus
- Future Forum
- Medicare for All Caucus
- Congressional Coalition on Adoption
- Rare Disease Caucus

== Political positions ==
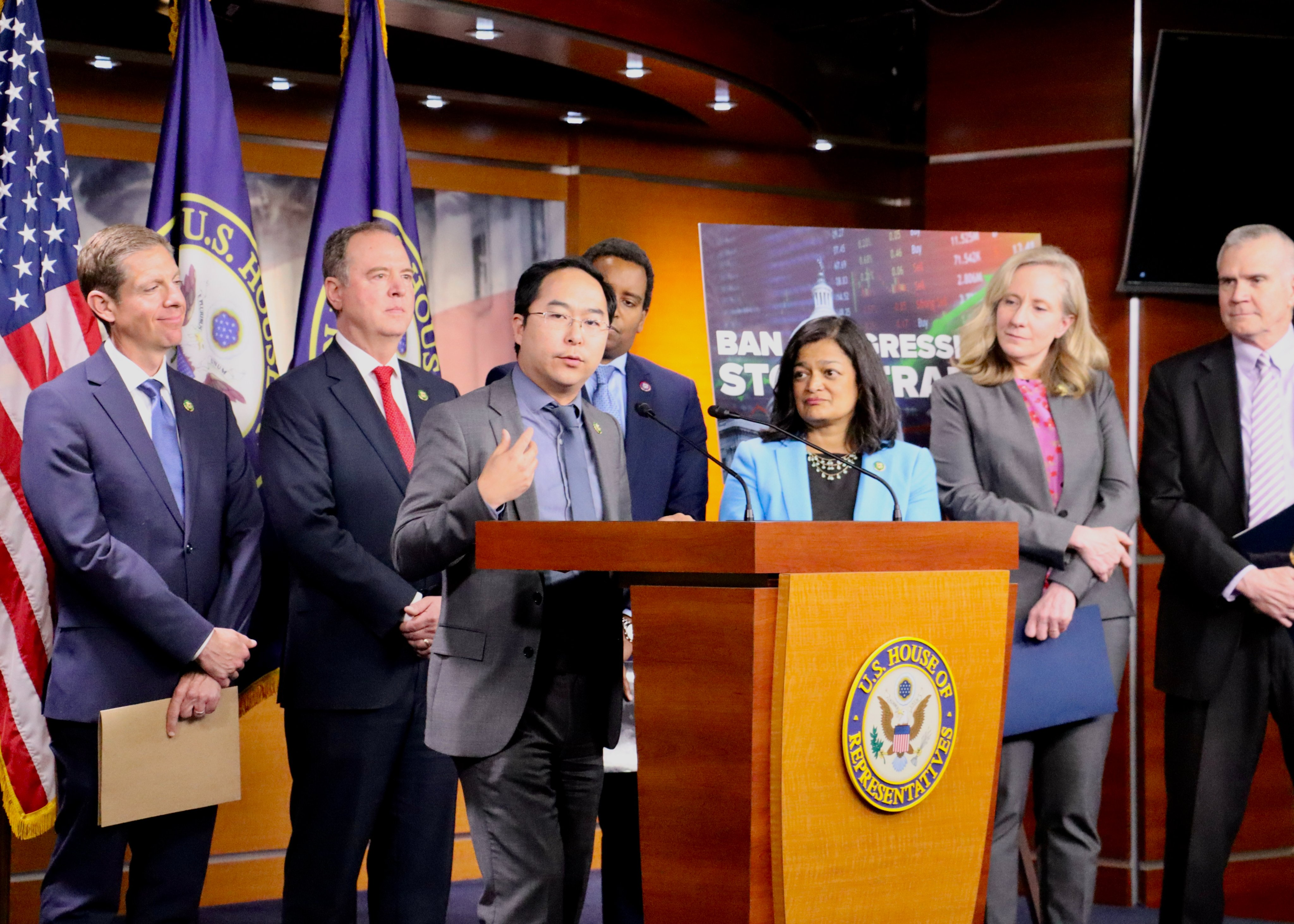
Neguse at a press conference supporting a ban on Congressional stock trading in May 2023

=== Social issues ===
Neguse supported the Equality Act. He supports the Voting Rights Act of 1965 and has introduced legislation to allow people aged 16 and 17 to preregister to vote. He co-sponsored the Emmett Till Antilynching Act. Neguse supports the national legalization of cannabis. Neguse supports universal background checks and believes there are limitations to the Second Amendment.

Neguse supported the proposed Antisemitism Awareness Act of 2023. This bill would codify the recognition by the Department of Education Civil Rights office of the International Holocaust Remembrance Alliance's (IHRA's) working definition of antisemitism, which classifies criticism of the state of Israel as antisemitic.

=== Climate change ===
Neguse has called climate change an "existential threat". He has introduced legislation to create a new version of the Civilian Conservation Corps to focus on forest management and wildfire mitigation. Neguse opposed the Trump administration's withdrawal from the Paris Agreement. He supports the Green New Deal. He supports efforts to increase fuel efficiency and federal incentives for renewable energy use. Neguse supports endangered wildlife protections, including sponsoring bills to support wildlife protections on the South Platte River. He also supports expanding the size of Arapaho National Forest.

=== Economic issues ===
Neguse opposed the Tax Cuts and Jobs Act of 2017. He opposes increased military spending.

=== Healthcare ===
Neguse supports Medicare for All and universal health care. He also supports mandatory coverage of preexisting conditions and opposes repealing the Affordable Care Act. Neguse supports the national expansion of COVID-19 testing and voted in support of stimulus funding related to the pandemic. He opposed the Trump administration's decision to leave the World Health Organization during the pandemic.

=== Voting rights ===
Neguse supports national mail-in voting. He also supports the Voting Rights Act of 1965.

=== Immigration and criminal justice ===
The son of immigrants, Neguse supports immigration reform and serves as the vice chair of the House Judiciary Subcommittee on Immigration and Citizenship. He supports a pathway for citizenship for undocumented immigrants in the U.S. and the DREAM Act. He supports police reform.

=== Stock trading prohibition by members of Congress ===
Neguse supports a prohibition on members of Congress trading in stocks.

== Electoral history ==
Colorado's Secretary of State results, 2014
Party	Candidate	Votes	%
Republican	Wayne Williams	932,588	47.34%
Democratic	Joe Neguse	886,043	44.98%
Constitution	Amanda Campbell	77,790	3.95%
Libertarian	David Schambach	73,413	3.73%
Total votes		1,969,834	100%
Republican hold			

Democratic primary results, Colorado 2018
Party	Candidate	Votes	%
Democratic	Joe Neguse	76,829	65.74%
Democratic	Mark Williams	40,044	34.26%
Total votes		116,873	100%

Colorado's 2nd congressional district results, 2018
Party	Candidate	Votes	%
Democratic	Joe Neguse	259,608	60.27%
Republican	Peter Yu	144,901	33.64%
Independent	Nick Thomas	16,356	3.80%
Libertarian	Roger Barris	9,749	2.26%
Write-in		151	0.03%
Total votes		430,765	100%
Democratic hold			

Colorado's 2nd congressional district results, 2020
Party	Candidate	Votes	%
Democratic	Joe Neguse (incumbent)	316,925	61.46%
Republican	Charles Winn	182,547	35.40%
Libertarian	Thom Atkinson	13,657	2.65%
Unity	Gary Swing	2,534	0.49%
Total votes		515,663	100%
Democratic hold			

Colorado's 2nd congressional district results, 2022
Party	Candidate	Votes	%
Democratic	Joe Neguse (incumbent)	244,107	69.98%
Republican	Marshall Dawson	97,770	28.01%
Colorado Center Party	Steve Yurash	2,876	0.82%
American Constitution	Gary L. Nation	2,188	0.63%
Unity	Tim Wolf	1,968	0.56%
Total votes		348,839	100%
Democratic hold			

Colorado's 2nd congressional district results, 2024
Party	Candidate	Votes	%
Democratic	Joe Neguse (incumbent)	284,994	68.36%
Republican	Marshall Dawson	120,633	28.94%
Libertarian	Gaylon Kent	5,180	1.24%
Unity	Cynthia Munhos de Aquino Sirianni	3,744	0.90%
Approval Voting	Jan Kok	2,349	0.56%
Write-in		8	0.00%
Total votes		416,908	100%
Democratic hold			

== Personal life ==
Neguse is married to Andrea Jimenez Rael. They met in Boulder County. Their daughter was born in August 2018 and their son in May 2023. They live in Lafayette, east of Boulder.

== See also ==
- List of African-American United States representatives

== Notes ==
Party political offices
Preceded by Bernie Buescher	Democratic nominee for Secretary of State of Colorado; 2014	Succeeded by Jena Griswold
Preceded by Jim Clyburn	House Assistant Democratic Leader; 2024–present	Incumbent
U.S. House of Representatives
Preceded by Jared Polis	Member of the U.S. House of Representatives from Colorado's 2nd congressional district 2019–present	Incumbent
U.S. order of precedence (ceremonial)
Preceded by Carol Miller	United States representatives by seniority 216th	Succeeded by Alexandria Ocasio-Cortez
