= Cindy Acree =

American politician

Member of the Colorado House of Representatives from the 40th district
- In office January 7, 2009 – January 9, 2013
- Preceded by: Debbie Stafford
- Succeeded by: John Buckner

Personal details
- Born: October 15, 1956 (age 70) Pasadena, Texas, U.S.
- Party: Republican
- Spouse: Robert (deceased 2009)
- Profession: Business Development Consultant & Owner of Cindy Acree Enterprises
- Website: cindyacree.com facebook.com/rep.cindy.acree.5 twitter.com/cindyacree http://www.linkedin.com/pub/cindy-acree/19/629/121

Cindy Acree was a legislator in the U.S. state of Colorado. Elected to the Colorado House of Representatives as a Republican in 2008, Acree represented House District 40, which encompasses Elbert County and eastern Arapahoe County from 2008 to 2012.

== Biography ==
=== Early life and education ===
Acree is a small business owner and mother of three. She is a business development consultant and was the owner of Protektmark LLC. She sold the company and now owns Cindy Acree Enterprises In 1977, Acree received an AA in Fine Arts and Political Science from Cottey College. She then attended Southern Methodist University, graduating with a BA in History, Political Science & Social Science Research. In 1988, she received a Masters of Science in Justice Administration from the University of Denver.

=== Health and advocacy ===
Acree had epilepsy for 15 years starting at the age of 21, then had a stroke at age 34, which was triggered by the surgery that corrected her epilepsy. She is now an advocate on behalf of all stroke survivors.

== Legislative career ==
At the height of her legislative career, Acree served as the Vice-Chair for the Health & Environment and the Chair for the Legislative Audit Committee. She also sat on the Finance Committee. She served on the Behavioral Health Transformation Council and Oversight of Mental Health in the Prison subcommittee. In 2012, she was appointed to serve on the National Conference of State Legislatures (NCSL) Human Services and Welfare Commission. Acree has held numerous government appointments including: President of the Aurora City Budget Committee; Director, Cherry Creek School District Facility Planning Committee and an appointment by Governor Bill Owens to the Cardiovascular Health Coalition. Acree has been endorsed by the NRA Political Victory Fund and was given the "Colorado Lawmaker Award" by the Denver Women's Commission and Colorado Women's Chamber of Commerce. The Colorado Farm Bureau designated Acree as a friend of Farm Bureau for her work in the 67th General Assembly. The Civil Justice League recognized her with the Common Sense in the Courtroom Award and she was endorsed by the National Federation of Independent Business.

=== 2008 election ===
Acree was unopposed in the 2008 Republican primary. In the general election, she faced Democrat Karen Wilde. Acree's candidacy was endorsed by the Aurora Sentinel and the Denver Post. Acree won the election with 58% of the popular vote.

Before being sworn into office, Acree was approached by several individuals with ties to the Colorado Chiropractic Association, all of whom pressed her to support David Balmer in House leadership elections. Acree filed a complaint, which prompted an ethics-investigation against Balmer. Balmer subsequently denied any wrongdoing, while one of the lobbyists involved, claimed ignorance of the applicable legislative rules The allegations against Balmer were eventually dropped due to lack of evidence.

=== 2009 legislative session ===
A highlight of her first year in office was a piece of legislation that required an interim legislative committee to study health insurance portability.

For the 2009 legislative session, Acree was named to seats on:

- House Health and Human Services Committee
- House Local Government Committee
- Local Government Committee

Legislation sponsored:

- HB 1020: Expedited Process for Reenrollment in Publicly Funded Medical Programs, signed by governor.
- HB 1102: Study Health Insurance Portability, signed by governor.
- HJR 1026: Interim Committee To Address Home And Community Based Services Waivers Waiting List For Children With Developmental Disabilities, signed by Speaker of House.
- SB 070: Clarify Workers' Compensation Procedures, signed by governor.
- SB 079: Post-adoption Contact Birth Siblings, signed by governor.
- SB 237: Grounds for Mandatory Expulsion, signed by governor.

=== 2010 legislative session ===
Committee appointments:

- Legislative Audit, Vice-Chair
- House Health & Environment, Vice-Chair
- House Finance

Legislation sponsored:

- HB 1029: HBState Negotiated Prices Medical Goods, signed by governor.
- HB10-1041: Universal Application Children's Medicaid, signed by governor.
- HB10-1213: Individualized Plans Developmentally Disabled Walk List, signed by governor.
- HB10-1255: Colorado Commission Deaf and Hard of Hearing, signed by governor.
- SB10-053: Metro Sewer District Board of Directors Weighted Voting, signed by governor.

=== 2010 election ===
After the 2010 Census, Acree was redistricted, into House District 40. In the general election, she defeated Libertarian James W. Phelps and Independent Pervaiz Kaiser.

=== 2011 legislative session ===
Committee appointments:

- Legislative Audit, Chair
- House Health & Environment, Vice-Chair
- House Finance

Legislation sponsored:

- HB 1010: Incidental Use of Tax-exempt Property, signed by governor.
- HB 1105: Hospital Worker Assault Protection, signed by governor.
- HB 1110: Residential Nonprofit Corp Meetings Refunds, signed by governor.
- HB 1149: Identity Verification of Lawful Presence, lost in House.
- HB 1217: Expand Access Health Care, lost in House.
- SB 082: OSA Security Audits IT Systems, signed by governor.

=== 2012 legislative session ===
Committee appointments:

- Legislative Audit, Chair
- Health & Environment, Vice Chair
- Finance

Legislation sponsored:

- HB 1008: Require agencies to present regulatory agenda, define adequate stakeholder participation & provide more notice when want to change in rules/regulations, signed by governor.
- HB 1206: Renew Cold Case Task Force and add a Forensic Pathologist, signed by governor.
- HB 1268: Medical Facility Inspections: moves inspections from the Dept. of Public Health to Fire Safety, signed by governor.
- HB 1320: Rename GEO to Co. Office of Energy Dev. Remove unfunded, underutilized or duplicated programs & renew focus on all natural resources, lost.
- HB 1326: Concerning Assistance to the Elderly with the Old Age Pension Fund (OAP), signed by governor.
- SB 118: Repeals restrictions on hotels that require 25% of sales to be from food to maintain liquor license, signed by governor.
- SB 134: Hospital Payment Assistance Program, awaiting signature by governor.

Legislation co-sponsored:

- HB 1088: Allowing the use of deadly force for protection in a business.
- HB 1096: Extend Make-A-Wish foundation tax check off.
- HB 1104: Colorado Cancer fund tax check off.
- HB 1130: Creates criminal penalty First Degree murder of an unborn child.
- HB 1149: Parents request action on Low-Performing Schools.
- HJR 1003: Tuskegee Airmen Memorial Trail designation on I-70.
- SJR 008: Support locating U.S. Patent & Trademark office in Colorado
- HJR 1003: Call for a Federal Convention to repeal Federal Health Law.

=== 2012 election ===
Acree faced Democrat John W. Buckner in the 2012 race for House District 40's legislative seat. The Aurora Sentinel declined to endorse either candidate, but did praise Acree saying she "has a strong understanding of medical issues, making her a solid asset in how best to implement the federal Affordable Care Act. She has proved herself to be dedicated listener and faithful advocate for those having to navigate the medical insurance industry."

In the 2012 General Election, Democratic challenger Buckner defeated Acree by a margin of 56% to 44%.
