= John Buckner (Colorado politician) =

American politician

Member of the Colorado House of Representatives from the 40th district
- In office 2013 – May 28, 2015
- Preceded by: Cindy Acree
- Succeeded by: Janet Buckner

Personal details
- Born: John William Buckner; November 12, 1947 Indianapolis, Indiana
- Died: May 28, 2015 (aged 67) Aurora, Colorado
- Party: Democratic
- Spouse: Janet Buckner
- Children: 3
- Education: Ball State University (BA)

John William Buckner (September 12, 1947 – May 28, 2015) was an American educator and politician who served in the Colorado House of Representatives from the 40th district from 2013 to 2015, as a member of the Democratic Party. He was the first black person to represent the 40th district in the state house.

== Early life and education ==
John William Buckner was born in Indianapolis, Indiana, on September 12, 1947, to Robert G. Buckner Jr. and Rachel D. Hardrick. He graduated from Shortridge High School in 1965. He graduated from Ball State University with a Bachelor of Arts in education in 1969. Buckner met his wife Janet Buckner, with whom he had three children, at Ball State University and married her on August 16, 1969.

The couple moved to Elgin, Illinois. Buckner then worked in the Cherry Creek School District for thirty-three years. In 1975, he became an assistant principal at Laredo Middle School and later worked as assistant principal at Smoky Hill High School and Prairie Middle School. From 1988 to 2005, he worked as the principal at Overland High School.

== Career ==
Buckner was elected to the Colorado House of Representatives after defeating incumbent Republican Representative Cindy Acree in the 2012 election. Acree had been redrawn into a more Democratic district after having easily won in the 2008 election and facing no Democratic opponent in the 2010 election. He won reelection after defeating Republican nominee Julie Marie A. Shepherd and Libertarian nominee Geoff Hierholz.

He was the first black person to represent the 40th district in the state house and served as vice-chair of the Black Caucus. Buckner also served as the chair of the Education committee.

== Death and legacy ==
Bucker took a leave of absence from the Colorado General Assembly in April 2015 due to health concerns. He died on May 28, from sarcoidosis in Aurora, Colorado. His name was added to the Emily Maureen Ellen Keyes and John W. Buckner Organ and Tissue Donation Awareness Fund permanently by the state house. Buckner's wife was selected unanimously by a vacancy committee of Arapahoe County House Democrats on June 25, to fill his seat and took office on July 15. Janet was reelected to the state house in 2016 and 2018, and later became the Speaker pro tempore.

== Electoral history ==
2012 Colorado House of Representatives 40th district Democratic primary
| Party | Candidate | Votes | % | ±% |
|---|---|---|---|---|
| Democratic | John Buckner | 2,130 | 100.00% | |
| Total votes | | 2,130 | 100.00% | |

2012 Colorado House of Representatives 13th district election
| Party | Candidate | Votes | % | ±% |
|---|---|---|---|---|
| Democratic | John Buckner | 20,163 | 57.17% | |
| Republican | Cindy Acree (incumbent) | 15,106 | 42.83% | |
| Total votes | | 35,269 | 100.00% | |

2014 Colorado House of Representatives 40th district Democratic primary
| Party | Candidate | Votes | % | ±% |
|---|---|---|---|---|
| Democratic | John Buckner (incumbent) | 2,534 | 100.00% | |
| Total votes | | 2,534 | 100.00% | |

2014 Colorado House of Representatives 13th district election
| Party | Candidate | Votes | % | ±% |
|---|---|---|---|---|
| Democratic | John Buckner (incumbent) | 13,815 | 51.29% | |
| Republican | Julie Marie A. Shepherd | 11,802 | 43.82% | |
| Libertarian | Geoff Hierholz | 1,318 | 4.89% | |
| Total votes | | 26,935 | 100.00% | |
