= Cary Kennedy =

American politician (born 1968)

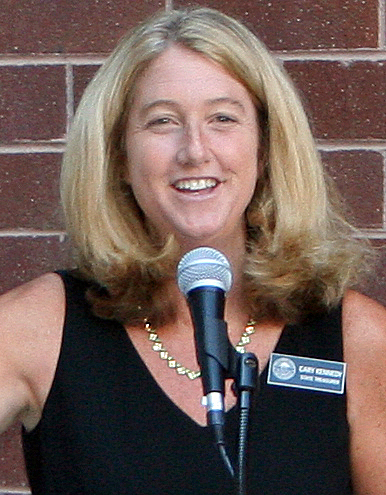

55th Treasurer of Colorado
- In office January 9, 2007 – January 11, 2011
- Governor: Bill Ritter
- Preceded by: Mike Coffman
- Succeeded by: Walker Stapleton

Personal details
- Born: 1968 (age 57–58) Colorado
- Party: Democratic
- Spouse: Saurabh Mangalik
- Children: 2
- Education: St. Lawrence University (BA); Columbia University (MA); University of Denver (JD)

Cary Kennedy is an American politician from Colorado. She is a former Colorado State Treasurer, as well as a former Deputy Mayor and Chief Financial Officer of Denver, Colorado. She was also a candidate for Governor of Colorado in the 2018 election.

== Biography ==
Kennedy was born in 1968 in Colorado. She attended Manual High School in Denver and holds a bachelor's degree from St. Lawrence University, a master's degree from Columbia University and a Juris Doctor degree from the University of Denver School of Law. She is not a member of the Kennedy political family.

Cary Kennedy worked as a budget analyst in Colorado Governor Romer's Office of State Planning and Budgeting and then as a fiscal analyst for the Colorado Department of Health Care Policy and Financing.

In 2006, Kennedy ran for the office of Colorado State Treasurer and won against her Republican opponent, former State Treasurer, Mark Hillman. She took office in January 2007.

Kennedy unsuccessfully ran for reelection in 2010, narrowly losing to her Republican opponent Walker Stapleton.

In April 2017, Kennedy announced her candidacy for Governor of Colorado in the 2018 election. She lost the Democratic primary election to U.S. Representative Jared Polis, who went on to win the general election, defeating her former Republican rival Walker Stapleton.

== Electoral history ==
Colorado General Election 2006: State Treasurer's race
Party	Candidate	Votes	%	±%
Democratic	Cary Kennedy	770,403	51.32	
Republican	Mark Hillman	730,718	48.68	

Colorado General Election 2010: State Treasurer's race
Party	Candidate	Votes	%	±%
Republican	Walker Stapleton	866,934	50.70	
Democratic	Cary Kennedy	842,877	49.30	

== City and County of Denver ==
When Michael Hancock took over as mayor of Denver in July, 2011, he appointed Kennedy as the city's Chief Financial Officer. In August, 2011, he appointed her Deputy Mayor. Under Denver law, the Mayor appoints one of his department heads as Deputy Mayor. On January 13, 2014, Denver announced that it would be able to build the Central Denver Recreation Center using bond money, proceeds from the sale of Market Street Station and funds from the Tabor emergency fund. The station was sold for $14.5 million, and the financial engineering to make it happen was led by Kennedy. The final cost of the recreation center (now called the Carla Madison Recreation Center) ended up being $44 million.

Political offices
Preceded by Mike Coffman	Treasurer of Colorado; 2007–2011	Succeeded by Walker Stapleton
