= Carole Murray =

American politician

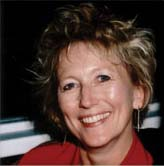

Member of the Colorado House of Representatives from the 45th district
- In office January 7, 2009 – January 7, 2015
- Preceded by: Victor Mitchell
- Succeeded by: Patrick Neville

Personal details
- Party: Republican

Carole Murray is a former legislator in the U.S. state of Colorado. Elected to the Colorado House of Representatives as a Republican in 2008, Murray represented House District 45, which encompassed Teller County and southern Douglas County, Colorado.

== Legislative career ==
=== 2008 election ===
Carole Murray defeated Mark Sievers in the contested Republican primary in August, taking 63 percent of votes cast.

Murray faced Democrat Holly Gorman, whose candidacy was endorsed by the Denver Post, in the November 2008 general election. Murray, however, won the election with 67 percent of the popular vote.

=== 2009 legislative session ===
For the 2009 legislative session, Murray was named to seats on the House Education Committee and the House State, Veterans, and Military Affairs Committee, where she was the ranking Republican member.

Murray sponsored legislation to curtail sexting by extending child pornography and luring laws to apply to activity over cell phones. Murray also introduced a bill to allow counties to conduct primary elections via mail ballots.

=== 2012 election ===
In the 2012 General Election, Representative Murray faced Democratic challenger Tony Stoughton. Murray was reelected by a wide margin of 67% to 29%.
