= Cynthia Coffman (politician) =

American attorney and politician

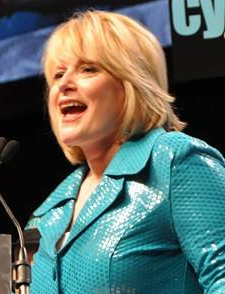

38th Attorney General of Colorado
- In office January 13, 2015 – January 8, 2019
- Governor: John Hickenlooper
- Preceded by: John Suthers
- Succeeded by: Phil Weiser

Personal details
- Born: Cynthia S. Honssinger; August 26, 1961 (age 64) Lebanon, Missouri, U.S.
- Party: Republican
- Spouse: Mike Coffman (m. 2005; div. 2017)
- Education: University of Missouri (BA); Georgia State University (JD)

Cynthia Honssinger Coffman (born August 26, 1961) is an American attorney and politician from the U.S. state of Colorado. A member of the Republican Party, she was elected Attorney General of Colorado in 2014, serving a single term from 2015 to 2019.

Coffman unsuccessfully sought the Republican nomination for governor of Colorado in 2018.

== Early life and career ==
Coffman graduated from the University of Missouri and received her J.D. degree from the Georgia State University College of Law. She began working in the office of the Georgia Attorney General in 1993. In 1996, she became a lawyer for the 1996 Summer Olympics, held in Atlanta. Following the Centennial Olympic Park bombing, Coffman served as a liaison to the families of the victims.

Coffman moved to Colorado in 1997 and worked for the legislative council of the Colorado Legislature. She served as legal counsel for the Colorado Department of Public Health and Environment from 1999 through 2004. She then served as legal counsel for Bill Owens, the Governor of Colorado, from 2004 to 2005 and as chief deputy attorney general under John Suthers, the Attorney General of Colorado, from 2004 through 2014. In 2012, Law Week Colorado named Coffman their Best Public Sector Lawyer.

== Attorney General of Colorado ==
In 2014, Coffman ran in the election for Attorney General of Colorado. She faced Mark Waller for the Republican Party nomination. She received Suthers' endorsement. After receiving the majority of support from Colorado delegates, Waller withdrew from the race. She received financial backing from the Republican Attorneys General Association Colorado PAC. Coffman defeated Democratic nominee Don Quick 54%-40% in the general election.

As attorney general, Coffman signed Colorado onto a lawsuit which sought to roll back the Clean Power Plan. Coffman also led the state's lawsuit against Boulder County over that county's drilling moratorium.

In 2018, instead of seeking reelection as Attorney General, Coffman chose to run for governor of Colorado. She failed to win the Republican nomination and was succeeded as attorney general by Democrat Phil Weiser, who defeated Republican George Brauchler for the post. Coffman's term ended on January 9, 2019.

== Personal life ==
In 2005, she had her second marriage to Mike Coffman, who represented Colorado's 6th congressional district in the United States House of Representatives. The couple divorced in June 2017.

== Electoral history ==
Colorado Attorney General Republican Primary Election, 2014
Party	Candidate	Votes	%
Republican	Cynthia Coffman	1,002,626	51.43
Democratic	Don Quick	826,182	42.38
Libertarian	David Williams	120,745	6.19

== See also ==
- List of female state attorneys general in the United States

Legal offices
Preceded by John Suthers	Attorney General of Colorado; 2015–2019	Succeeded by Phil Weiser
