= Colorado Division of Insurance =

State agency of Colorado, United States

Division of Insurance
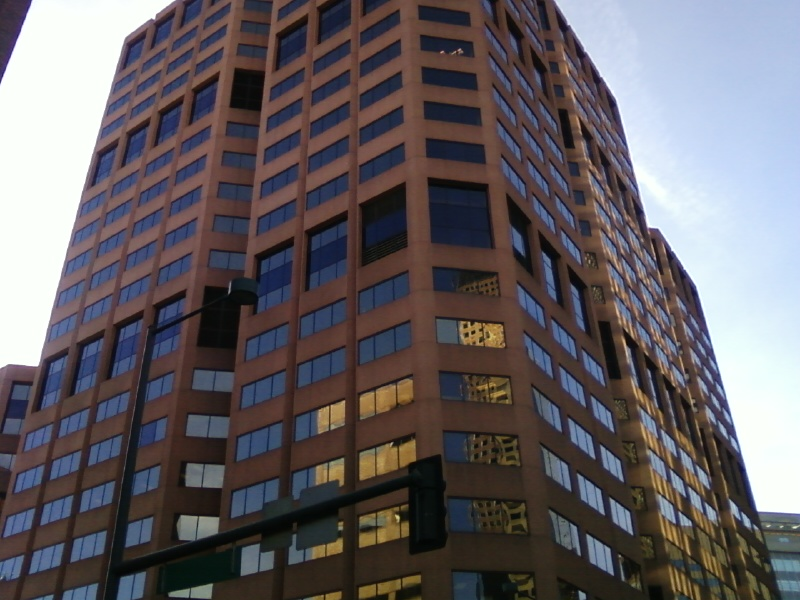
- One Civic Center Plaza

Division overview
- Jurisdiction: Colorado
- Headquarters: One Civic Center Plaza 1560 Broadway, Denver, Colorado
- Division executive: Michael Conway, Commissioner
- Website: doi.colorado.gov

The Colorado Division of Insurance was established by the Colorado General Assembly in 1879. It became part of the Department of Regulatory Agencies (DORA) in 1968.

The chief executive officer of the Division is the Commissioner of Insurance. The Commissioner is appointed by the governor, Prior to 1906, the commissioner was known as the Superintendent of Insurance and was under the State Auditor, and until 1984 was a state employee. In 1984 the position changed to become a gubernatorial appointee.

The Colorado Division of Insurance regulates the insurance industry and assists consumers and other stakeholders with insurance issues.

Its statutory mission is consumer protection.

The current Commissioner is Michael Conway (appointed in January 2018) by Governor John Hickenlooper.
