= Sean Connelly (lawyer) =

American attorney and judge

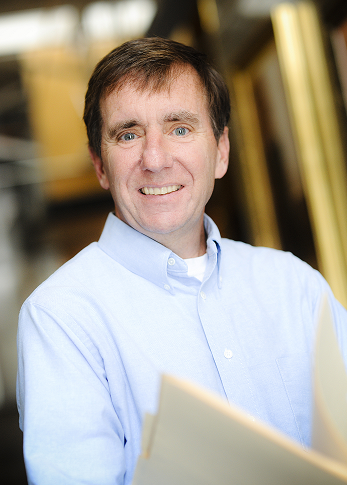
- Born: August 23, 1958 (age 68); Glen Cove, New York
- Education: Columbus School of Law (J.D.)
- Occupation: Attorney
- Employer: Reilly Pozner LLP
- Known for: DOJ Prosecutor for Oklahoma City bombing trial and appeal Judge – Colorado Court of Appeals (2008 - 2011)
- Website: http://www.rplaw.com/sean-connelly/

Sean Connelly (born August 23, 1958) is an American attorney and former judge on the Colorado Court of Appeals. He is a former member of the U.S. Department of Justice trial team and the lead appellate prosecutor in the Oklahoma City bombing cases. He was appointed by then Colorado Governor Bill Ritter to the Colorado Court of Appeals in 2008 and did not seek retention of his appointment in 2011 and returned to private practice.

== Early life and education ==
Connelly received his bachelor's degree from Fairfield University in 1980 and his J.D. degree from the Columbus School of Law at The Catholic University of America in 1983 where he was a Comments Editor for the Law Review and received the Faculty Award for the highest ranking law student.

== Career ==
=== Early career ===
Connelly began his career as a judicial law clerk with the U.S. Court of Appeals for the D.C. Circuit from 1983 to 1984. He was in private practice from 1984 to 1990 prior to joining the United States Department of Justice.

=== U.S. Department of Justice 1990 - 2002 ===
Connelly joined the U.S. Department of Justice in 1990. During his 12 years at Justice, Connelly served as a Special Attorney to United States Attorney General John Ashcroft and Janet Reno, as Chief of the U.S. Attorney's Office Appellate Section, and as a Criminal Division trial attorney. As Special Attorney to the Attorney General, Connelly was a member of the trial team and was the lead appellate prosecutor in the Oklahoma City bombing cases. Those prosecutions resulted in the separate convictions of Timothy McVeigh and Terry Nichols for the April 1995 bombing of the Alfred P. Murrah Federal Building in Oklahoma City, which resulted in 168 deaths.

=== Reilly Pozner LLP 2002 - 2008 ===
Following his roles at the U.S. Department of Justice, Connelly returned to private practice in 2002 at the law firm of Reilly Pozner LLP (known as Hoffman, Reilly & Pozner at the time). One of his most publicized cases during his time at Reilly Pozner involved the ownership dispute of the Denver Broncos between Pat Bowlen and Edgar Kaiser. Kaiser originally sold his share of the team to Bowlen in 1984. Kaiser sued Bowlen in 2004 after Bowlen offered John Elway a 10% share in the team. Kaiser claimed to have first right of refusal for any ownership change and subsequently won judgment against Bowlen for breach of contract. Connelly represented Bowlen during the appeal process, during which the appeals court overturned the original ruling, stating that the deal between Bowlen and Elway did not violate any agreement between Kaiser and Bowlen. Connelly was made partner in the firm in 2002 and was with the firm until 2008 prior to his judicial appointment.

=== Colorado Court of Appeals 2008 - 2011 ===
Connelly was appointed to the Colorado Court of Appeals by then Governor Bill Ritter in 2008. During his time on the bench, he authored more than 40 published opinions. In July 2010, he announced that he would not seek retention of his appointment and would return to the law firm of Reilly Pozner LLP to oversee the opening of their new law office in Washington D.C.

== Awards and recognition ==
Connelly has received special recognition throughout his career as an attorney and judge. In 2013, he was named Lawyer of the Year for Denver Appellate Practice by The Best Lawyers In America. In 2009, he was voted by Colorado Law Week as Colorado's Outstanding Appeals Court Judge. Connelly also received the Exceptional Service Award (the highest award given by the U.S. Department of Justice) from United States Attorney Janet Reno for his role in the prosecutions of Timothy McVeigh and Terry Nichols for the Oklahoma City Bombing in 1995.

Legal offices
| Preceded by | Colorado Court of Appeals Judge; 2008-2011 | Succeeded by Maria Teresa "Terry" Fox |
