= Debbie Stafford =

American politician (born 1953)

Member of the Colorado House of Representatives from the 40th district
- In office October 26, 2000 – January 7, 2009
- Preceded by: Gary McPherson
- Succeeded by: Cindy Acree

Personal details
- Born: April 5, 1953 (age 73) Rapid City, South Dakota
- Party: Republican (before 2007); Democratic (2007–present)
- Spouse: Bob Edison
- Profession: Minister, Domestic Violence Counselor, Auctioneer

Debbie Stafford (born April 5, 1953) is a Colorado legislator. First appointed to the Colorado House of Representatives as a Republican in 2000, Stafford was elected four times to represent House District 40, which encompasses Elbert County and rural Arapahoe County east of Aurora, Colorado. Noted for her work on animal welfare and children's issues, Stafford left the Republican caucus and joined the Democratic Party in October 2007.

== Early career ==
Born in Rapid City, South Dakota of Lakota Sioux descent, Stafford graduated from the Pikes Peak Institute of Medical Technology in 1972 and worked as a medical and optometric assistant in Colorado Springs before attending Nazarene Bible College from 1973 to 1974. An ordained minister, she served as associate pastor of Calvary Temple and Heritage Christian Center from 1986 to 1989 before becoming a domestic violence counselor in the 1990s. In 1997, Heritage Christian Center founded Project Heritage, a community nonprofit serving the needy; Stafford has served as the chair of Project Heritage's board of directors. She also earned an associate of arts degree from Aspen College in 1992.

In 2001 Stafford became a trained auctioneer, and she has employed her auctioneering skills during nonprofit fundraisers during her time as a legislator. Stafford has three children—Matthew, Melissa, and Rebekah; she was widowed during her first legislative campaign in 2000 and has since remarried to retired Defense Intelligence Agency employee Bob Edison.

== Legislative career ==
Stafford first ran for the Colorado State House as a Republican in 2000. Shortly before the November 2000 election, retiring Rep. Gary McPherson died in an airplane crash, and Gov. Bill Owens appointed Stafford to the remainder of McPherson's legislative term. She was sworn in as a state representative on October 26, 2000, and was elected to a full term in the legislature just a week later. Stafford was re-elected in 2002, 2004, and 2006, always by a considerable margin in the solidly Republican district.

In the legislature, Stafford's priorities have included legislation on animal issues, including strengthening animal cruelty laws and opposing local bans on particular dog breeds. She has also been an advocate for children's issues, working to expand benefits in Colorado's foster care system and serving as a legislative advisor to the Center for Missing and Exploited Children, and for affordable housing, as a member of Board of the Federal Home Loan Bank of Topeka and as chair the Colorado legislature's Affordable Housing Task Force.

Although Stafford holds traditionally conservative views on issues such as abortion, stem cell research, and school vouchers, Stafford has also crossed the aisle to support measures to end Colorado's death penalty and prohibit discrimination on the basis of sexual orientation. In 2007, she also faced opposition from many in the Republican Party for supporting a contentious bill to expand the ability of homeowners to sue over construction defects.

In October 2007, Stafford announced that she would switch party affiliation from Republican to Democrat, citing poor treatment from Republican leaders, and noting, "I am not leaving the Republican Party as much as the Republican Party left me." She was welcomed by the Democratic legislative majority as the 40th member of the House Democratic Caucus. In switching parties, she became the first Colorado legislator to do so since 1987. When she switched political parties, ( in the middle of her term ), she described herself as being treated like " a battered women " in the Republican party. This drew sharp criticism from both Democrats and Republicans with some of her constituents questioning her mental health.

In the 2007 legislative session, Stafford served as a member of the House Health and Human Services Committee and the House Judiciary Committee. Although she briefly explored a run for the Colorado State Senate, Stafford has indicated that she will retire from the legislature after the 2008 session. Her stated priorities for her final session in the legislature include regulations prohibiting disposal of dead animals in landfills. Stafford has also introduced legislation to regulate the funeral industry, including new requirements that funeral directors be licensed; she sponsored a similar measure in 2006 that was vetoed by Gov. Bill Owens.

Having joined the majority party, Stafford was named vice-chair of the House Judiciary Committee in the 2008 legislative session, in addition to keeping her seat on the House Health and Human Services Committee.

In the 2008 legislative session, Stafford planned to sponsor legislation to regulate hunting in Colorado, requiring that hunters must allow hunted animals opportunity for a "fair chase." The measure was opposed by some wildlife ranchers. Facing opposition from hunters and ranchers, Stafford asked for the bill to be killed in committee. Stafford also introduced legislation to restrict the ability of toll road companies to claim land within proposed road corridors, legislation killed in a house committee for its possible effects on railroads.

Stafford also sat on the Colorado Developmental Disabilities Council, a position she held through July 2010.
