= Cherylin Peniston =

American politician

Member of the Colorado House of Representatives from the 35th district
- In office January 10, 2007 – January 7, 2015
- Preceded by: Ann Ragsdale
- Succeeded by: Faith Winter

Personal details
- Born: March 3, 1948 (age 78) Chicago, Illinois
- Party: Democratic
- Spouse: W.J.
- Profession: Teacher

Cherylin Naylor Peniston (born 3 March 1948) is a former legislator in the U.S. state of Colorado. A career public school teacher, Peniston was first elected as a Democrat in 2006 to the Colorado House of Representatives. She represented House District 35, which encompasses most of Westminster, Colorado and portions of Arvada. Term limited, she did not seek re-election in 2014.

== Biography ==
Born in Chicago, Illinois, Peniston earned a bachelor's degree in education from the University of La Verne in 1970, and spent her career teaching social studies and foreign languages at Scott Carpenter Middle School in Adams County School District 50 from 1971 to 1999.

While teaching, she earned her master's degree in International Studies from the University of Denver in 1990, and won two Fulbright Scholarships to study abroad — for six weeks in Egypt in 1987 and for three weeks in Japan in 1997.

Between 1999 and 2003, Peniston was elected to two terms as president of the Westminster Education Association, the local union associated with the National Education Association. She was also a member of the District 50 Education Foundation, and was also a substitute teacher at Scott Carpenter Middle School from 2003 until 2006.

From 2005 to 2006, Peniston was Assistant Secretary of the Adams County Democratic Party, and was a member of the Adams County Democratic Latino PAC and the Colorado Democratic Latino Initiative. Peniston is married; she and her husband, W.J., have two children, Erin and Geoffry, and at least one grandchild.

== Legislative career ==
=== 2006 election ===
Spurred to run for elected office because of her experiences as a teacher and union leader, Peniston was elected to the state house in 2006, first winning the Democratic party primary over Jeff Vigil and then defeating Republican Ruben Pacheco by a 2:1 margin, winning a predominantly Democratic district in which Pacheco did not run an active campaign. Peniston was endorsed both by the Rocky Mountain News and the Denver Post, as well as by the Brady Campaign to Prevent Gun Violence.

=== 2007 legislative session ===
In the 2007 session of the Colorado General Assembly, Peniston sat on the House Education Committee and the House Local Government Committee. Peniston's only unsuccessful bill during the 2007 session was a measure to require that school districts which make budget cutbacks cut pay for administrators as well as teachers; it was killed in a Senate committee.

Following the legislative session, Peniston served on the legislature's Police Officers' and Firefighters' Pension Reform Commission.

=== 2008 legislative session ===
In the 2008 session of the Colorado General Assembly, Peniston sits on the House Education Committee and the House Local Government Committee.

Peniston worked with elementary school students in Adams County to draft and sponsor a measure to name the Western painted turtle the Colorado state reptile. After passing the General Assembly, the bill was signed into law by Gov. Bill Ritter at the students' school.

=== 2008 election ===
Peniston sought a second term in the legislature in 2008, facing Republican Tracy Gimer. Peniston's re-election bid was endorsed by the Denver Post, and she prevailed with 67 percent of the popular vote.

Peniston has also sponsored legislation to require that adopted pets be spayed or neutered, to allow gifted children to enter kindergarten or first grade at earlier ages, to create curricula for students in juvenile detention or residential treatment, and to allow residential projects as part of transit-oriented development in conjunction with FasTracks.

=== 2009 legislative session ===
For the 2009 legislative session, Peniston was named to chair the House Local Government Committee and to a seat on the House Education Committee.

With Sen. John Morse, Peniston plans on introducing legislation to increase vehicle registration fees by $1 to pay for rural ambulance services. Peniston has also sponsored legislation to require tags or ID chips on many domestic cats.

=== 2012 election ===
In the 2012 General Election, Representative Peniston faced Republican challenger Brian Vande Krol. Peniston was elected by a margin of 56% to 44%.
