= Colorado Department of Regulatory Agencies =

American government agency

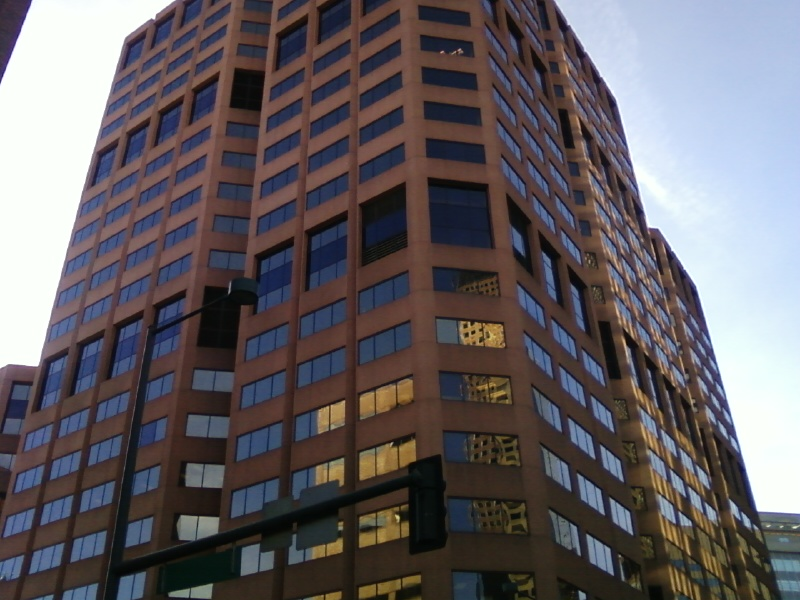
- One Civic Center Plaza

Department overview
- Jurisdiction: Colorado
- Headquarters: One Civic Center Plaza; 1560 Broadway, Suite 110 Denver, Colorado 80202
- Department executive: Patty Salazar, Executive Director
- Website: dora.colorado.gov

The Colorado Department of Regulatory Agencies (DORA) is the principal department of the Colorado state government responsible for professional licensing and consumer protection.

As the consumer protection agency for the State of Colorado, DORA's nine Divisions and more than 40 boards, commissions, and advisory committees license and regulate more than 700,000 people and 24,000 businesses in the state. DORA serves as a resource for objective information about licensed Colorado industries, professions and occupations, takes consumer complaints and works to educate consumers about their rights.

== Structure ==
DORA is composed of these divisions:

- Executive Director's Office
- Office of Policy, Research & Regulatory Reform
- Division of Banking
- Division of Civil Rights
- Division of Financial Services
- Division of Insurance
- Division of Professions and Occupations
- Division of Real Estate
- Division of Securities
- Office of Consumer Counsel
- Public Utilities Commission

== History ==
The Colorado Department of Regulatory Agencies was created in 1968, although several of the department's divisions have been protecting Colorado citizens previously:

- In 1877, state regulation of Colorado banks began one year after statehood was achieved, when the Colorado Legislature first codified the process by which banking associations could be chartered and operated.
- In 1883, Colorado began to regulate insurance through the State Auditor's Office. In 1913, the Colorado Department of Insurance, now known as the Division of Insurance, was formed in response to widespread growth in the industry.
- In 1913, the Colorado Public Utilities Commission was created when the State Legislature created it as part of the passage of the Public Utilities Act of 1913.
- In 1923, regulation of the offer and sale of securities to investors began through the Division of Securities.
- The real estate industry has been regulated since 1925 through what is now the Division of Real Estate.
- In 1931, Colorado began chartering credit unions, when the General Assembly passed the Credit Union Act. Regulation of credit unions, savings and loan institutions and trust companies is conducted by what is now known as the Division of Financial Services.
- In 1951, Colorado became the third state to establish a civil rights agency, now known as the Colorado Civil Rights Division.
- In 1968, the Department of Regulatory Agencies was created pursuant to the "Administrative Organization Act of 1968". The act moved the aforementioned agencies into one umbrella department. The act also created the Division of Registrations (now known as the Division of Professions and Occupations) and moved many existing boards under its purview, some of which had been in existence for over a century.
- In 1976, Colorado passed the first Sunset Law in the United States. This law requires the periodic review of various agencies throughout state government. In 1985, the Colorado General Assembly passed the Sunrise law as a complement to the Sunset law. This law requires that a review be conducted on all proposals to regulate previously unregulated occupations or professions. The Office of Policy, Research and Regulatory Reform, an office within the Executive Director's Office of the Department of Regulatory Agencies, conducts these reviews.
- The Office of Consumer Counsel (OCC) was created by the General Assembly as a division of the Attorney General's Office on July 1, 1984. OCC is now located within DORA. Its mission is the representation of residential, small business and agricultural utility consumers on certain utility issues before the Colorado Public Utilities Commission.

== Program Areas ==
Investigations

Criminal and compliance investigations, both in response to formal complaints and as part of regular audits. Divisions: Civil Rights, Insurance, Professions and Occupations, Public Utilities Commission, Real Estate, Securities.

Enforcement

Resolution of complaints/charges received and proactive enforcement/compliance oriented investigations ensuring adequate consumer protection. Divisions: Civil Rights, Insurance, Professions and Occupations, Public Utilities Commission, Real Estate, Securities.

Consumer Representation During Utility Rate Approvals

Present evidence in support of consumers when utilities request rate increases. Divisions: Office of Consumer Counsel.

Consumer Assistance and Contact/Complaint Resolution

Informal complaint resolution, including responses to general consumer inquiries. Divisions: All.

Institutional Examinations

Examinations of all state-chartered financial institutions and insurance companies. Divisions: Banking, Financial Services, Insurance, Real Estate, Securities.

Education, Outreach and Training

Proactive dissemination of information about consumer rights. Divisions: All.
