= Walker Stapleton =

American politician (born 1974)

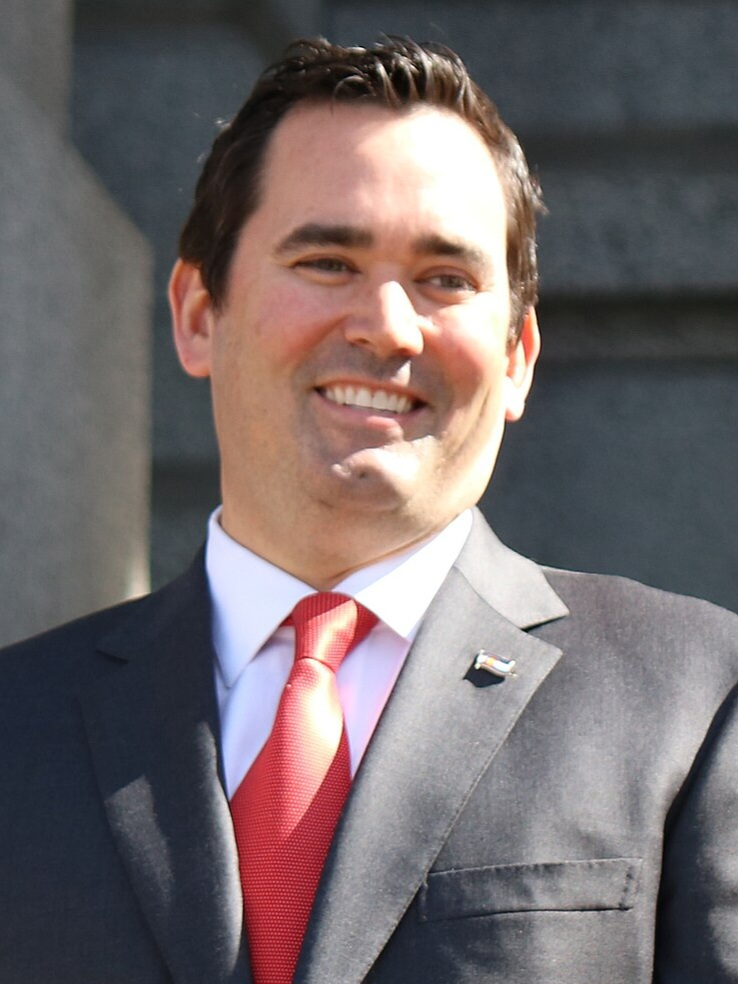
- Stapleton in 2017

56th Treasurer of Colorado
- In office January 11, 2011 – January 8, 2019
- Governor: John Hickenlooper
- Preceded by: Cary Kennedy
- Succeeded by: Dave Young

Personal details
- Born: April 15, 1974 (age 52) Washington, D.C., U.S.
- Party: Republican
- Spouse: Jenna Stapleton
- Children: 3
- Relatives: Craig Roberts Stapleton (Father); Benjamin F. Stapleton (paternal great-grandfather); George Herbert Walker (maternal great-grandfather)
- Education: Williams College (BA); London School of Economics (MA); Harvard University (MBA)

Walker Stapleton (born April 15, 1974) is an American politician who served two terms as Colorado's state treasurer from 2011 to 2019. Stapleton was the Republican nominee for Governor of Colorado in the 2018 election, which he lost to Democrat Jared Polis.

== Early life and family ==
Stapleton's family has been active in Colorado since the early 1900s. Walker was born in Washington, D.C., and grew up in Greenwich, Connecticut, attending the private Brunswick School. He graduated from Williams College in Massachusetts, and holds a graduate degree in business economics from the London School of Economics and an MBA from Harvard Business School.

Stapleton's mother, Dorothy Walker Stapleton, is a first cousin once removed of former U.S. president George H. W. Bush, making him a second cousin of former U.S. president George W. Bush and former Florida governor Jeb Bush. He has maintained close ties to the Bush family and credits George H. W. Bush for inspiring him to enter politics. His father is diplomat Craig Roberts Stapleton. His great-grandfather, Benjamin F. Stapleton, served as mayor of Denver from 1923 to 1931 and 1935 to 1947.

== Career ==
Stapleton began his private sector career in 1997 at Hambrecht & Quist as an investment banker. Two years later, he became Director of Business Development for Live365. He subsequently was CEO and CFO of various private and publicly traded companies, until assuming office as Colorado Treasurer in 2011.

In early 2018, Stapleton, then running for governor of Colorado, was accused by fellow candidate Steve Barlock of paying off the History Colorado Center to remove mention of the family's ties with the white supremacy movement and the beginnings of the Ku Klux Klan in America from their exhibitions.

Stapleton was a 2014 Aspen Institute Rodel Fellow. In January 2022 Governor Jared Polis appointed Stapleton to the state's Economic Development Commission.

== Personal life ==
Stapleton married Jennifer (Jenna) Bertocchi at St. Ann's Episcopal Church in Kennebunkport, Maine on August 26, 2006. The couple have three children and live in Greenwood Village, Colorado.

== Electoral history ==
Colorado Treasurer Republican primary election, 2010
Party	Candidate	Votes	%
Republican	Walker Stapleton	181,420	50.90
Republican	J. J. Ament	174,992	49.10

Colorado Treasurer Election, 2010
Party	Candidate	Votes	%
Republican	Walker Stapleton	866,934	50.70
Democratic	Cary Kennedy (inc.)	842,877	49.30

Colorado Treasurer Election, 2014
Party	Candidate	Votes	%
Republican	Walker Stapleton (inc.)	979,281	49.87
Democratic	Betsy Markey	882,437	44.94
Libertarian	David Jurist	101,826	5.19

Colorado Gubernatorial Election, 2018
Party	Candidate	Votes	%
Democratic	Jared Polis	1,348,888	53.4
Republican	Walker Stapleton	1,080,801	42.8
Libertarian	Scott Helker	69,519	2.7
Unity	Bill Hammons	25,854	1.0

Political offices
Preceded by Cary Kennedy	Treasurer of Colorado; 2011–2019	Succeeded by Dave Young
Party political offices
Preceded by Bob Beauprez	Republican nominee for Governor of Colorado; 2018	Succeeded by Heidi Ganahl
