= Electoral history of John Hickenlooper =

Elections featuring American politician

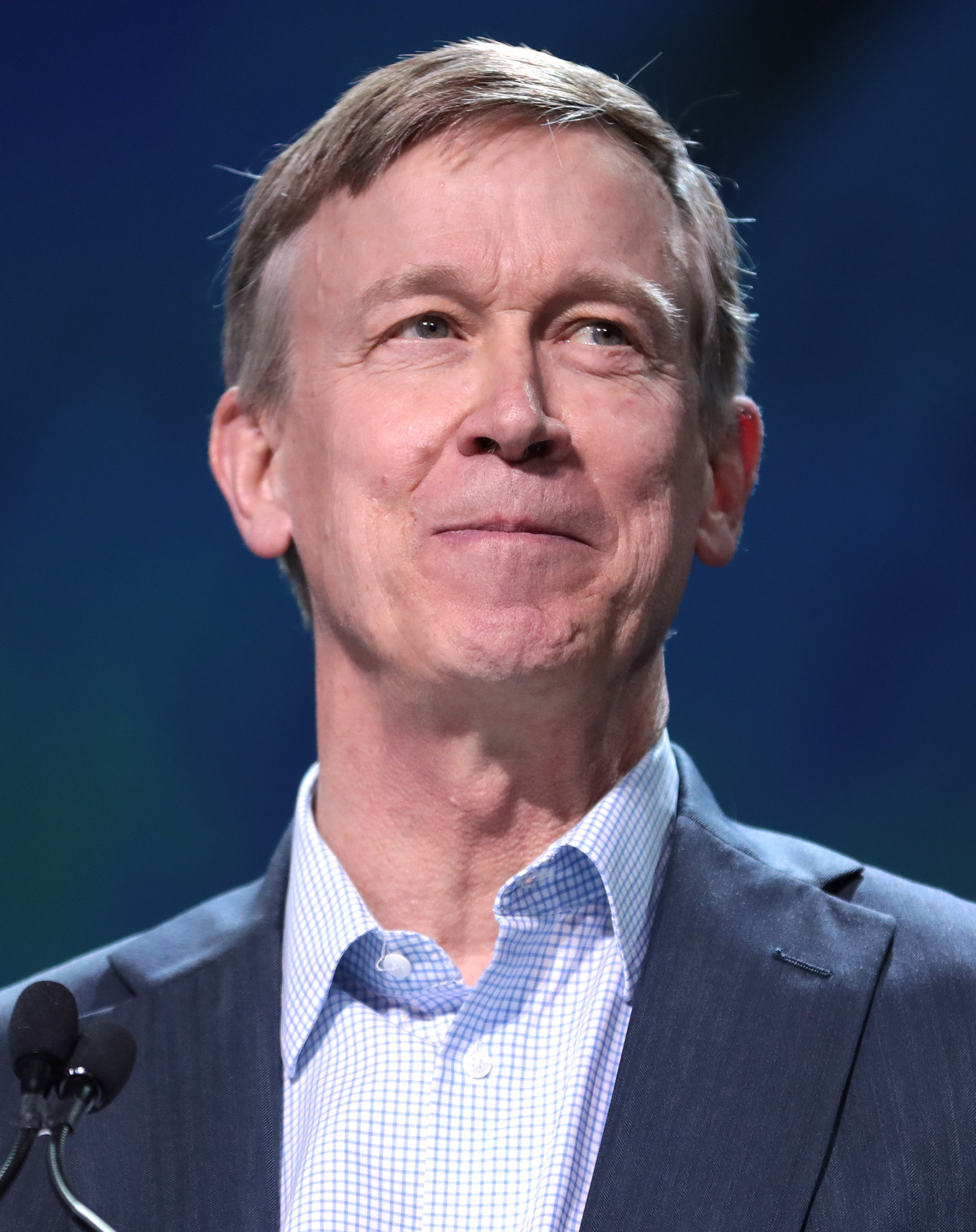
John Hickenlooper speaking at the 2019 California Democratic Party State Convention.

This is the electoral history of John Hickenlooper, the junior United States senator from Colorado since 2021. He previously served as the 43rd mayor of Denver from 2003 to 2011 and the 42nd governor of Colorado from 2011 to 2019. Hickenlooper briefly sought the 2020 Democratic nomination for President. He ended his presidential campaign in 2019 before voting began and announced his campaign for U.S. Senate days later.

== Denver mayoral elections ==
=== 2003 ===
2003 Denver mayoral general election
Party	Candidate	Votes	%
Nonpartisan	John Hickenlooper	49,185	43.33%
Nonpartisan	Donald J. Mares	25,308	22.29%
Nonpartisan	Aristedes 'Ari' Zavaras	14,145	12.46%
Nonpartisan	Penfield Tate III	13,450	11.85%
Nonpartisan	Susan Casey	8,162	7.19%
Nonpartisan	Elizabeth Schlosser	1,812	1.60%
Nonpartisan	Phil Perington	1,247	1.10%
Write-in		211	0.19%
Total votes		113,520	100.0%

2003 Denver mayoral runoff election
Party	Candidate	Votes	%
Nonpartisan	John Hickenlooper	69,526	64.58%
Nonpartisan	Donald J. Mares	38,126	35.42%
Total votes		107,652	100.0%

=== 2007 ===
2007 Denver mayoral general election
Party	Candidate	Votes	%
Nonpartisan	John Hickenlooper (incumbent)	68,568	86.30%
Nonpartisan	Danny F. Lopez	10,053	12.65%
Write-in		834	1.05%
Total votes		79,455	100.0%

== Colorado gubernatorial elections ==
=== 2010 ===
2010 Colorado gubernatorial Democratic primary
Party	Candidate	Votes	%
Democratic	John Hickenlooper	303,245	100.00%
Total votes		303,245	100

2010 Colorado gubernatorial general election
Party	Candidate	Votes	%
Democratic	John Hickenlooper/Joseph Garcia	915,436	51.05%
Constitution	Tom Tancredo/Pat Miller	652,376	36.38%
Republican	Dan Maes/Tambor Williams	199,792	11.14%
Libertarian	Jaimes Brown/Ken Wyble	13,365	0.75%
Independent	Jason R. Clark	8,601	0.48%
Independent	Paul Fiorino/Heather McKibbin	3,492	0.19%
Write-in		86	<0.01%
Total votes		1,793,148	100.0%

=== 2014 ===
2014 Colorado gubernatorial Democratic primary
Party	Candidate	Votes	%
Democratic	John Hickenlooper (incumbent)	214,403	100.00%
Total votes		214,403	100.0%

2014 Colorado gubernatorial general election
Party	Candidate	Votes	%
Democratic	John Hickenlooper/Joseph Garcia (incumbent)	1,006,433	49.30%
Republican	Bob Beauprez/Jill Repella	938,195	45.95%
Libertarian	Matthew Hess/Brandon Young	39,590	1.94%
Green	Harry Hempy/Scott Olson	27,391	1.34%
Independent	Mike Dunafon/Robin J. Roberts	24,042	1.18%
Independent	Paul Fiorino/Charles George Whitley	5,923	0.29%
Write-in	Marcus Giavanni/Jashua Yballa	31	<0.01%
Total votes		2,041,605	100.0%

== U.S. Senate elections ==
=== 2020 ===
2020 U.S. Senator from Colorado Democratic primary
Party	Candidate	Votes	%
Democratic	John Hickenlooper	585,826	58.65%
Democratic	Andrew Romanoff	412,955	41.35%
Total votes		998,781	100.0%

2020 U.S. Senator from Colorado general election
Party	Candidate	Votes	%	±%
Democratic	John Hickenlooper	1,731,114	53.50%	+7.24%
Republican	Cory Gardner (incumbent)	1,429,492	44.18%	−4.03%
Libertarian	Raymon Doane	56,262	1.74%	−0.85%
Approval Voting	Daniel Doyle	9,820	0.30%	N/A
Unity	Stephen Evans	8,971	0.28%	−0.04%
Total votes		3,235,659	100.0%	
Democratic gain from Republican				

=== 2026 ===
2026 U.S. Senator from Colorado Democratic primary
Party	Candidate	Votes	%
Democratic	John Hickenlooper (incumbent)	472,870	52.8
Democratic	Julie Gonzales	422,488	47.2
Total votes		895,358	100.0
