= 2010 Colorado gubernatorial election =

- November 2, 2010
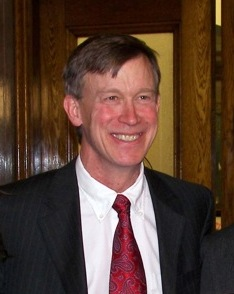

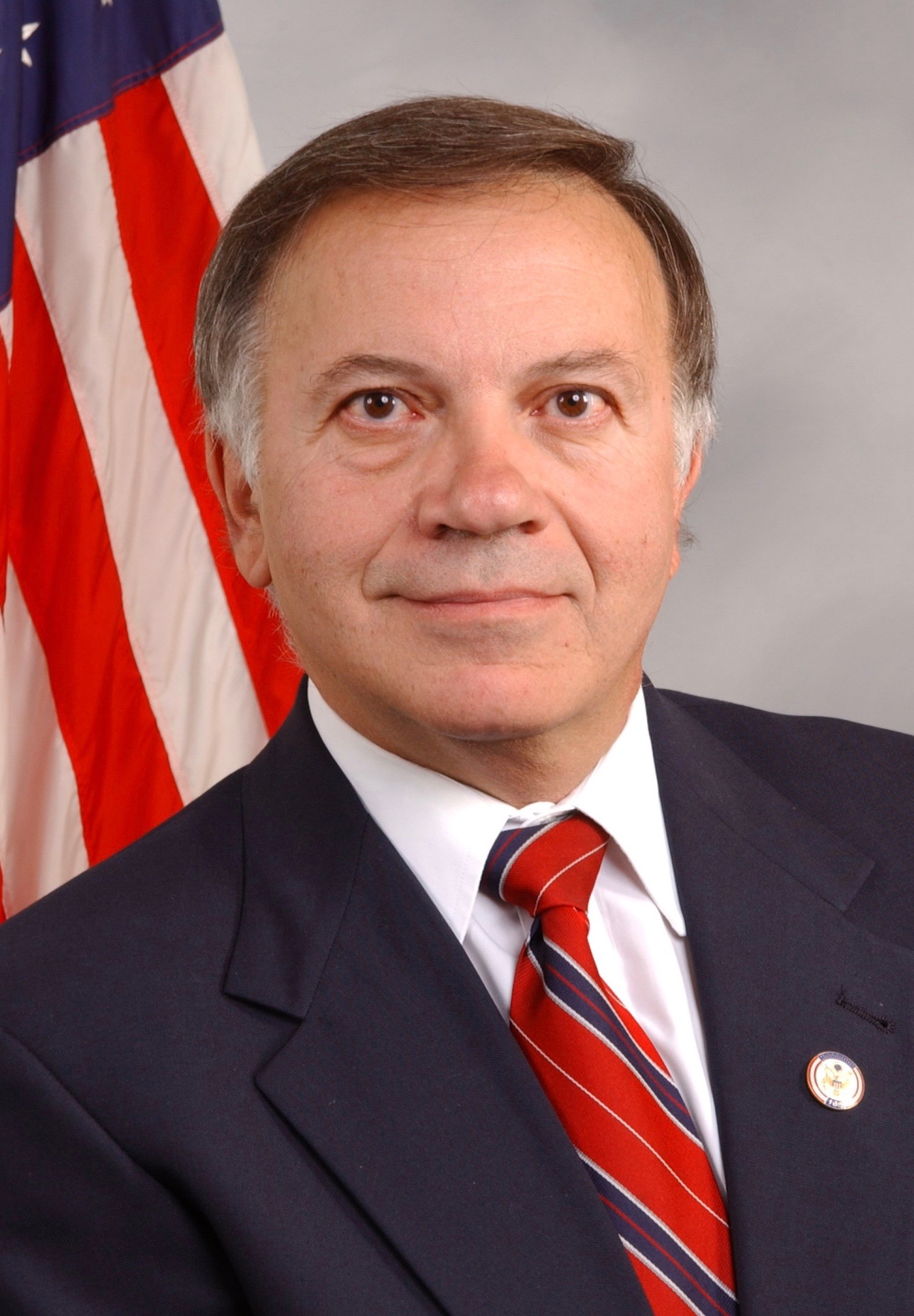

Nominee	John Hickenlooper	Tom Tancredo	Dan Maes
Party	Democratic	Constitution	Republican
Running mate	Joseph Garcia	Pat Miller	Tambor Williams
Popular vote	915,436	652,376	199,792
Percentage	51.05%	36.38%	11.14%
- Hickenlooper: 30–40% 40–50% 50–60% 60–70% 70–80% 80–90% >90% Tancredo: 30–40% 40–50% 50–60% 60–70% 70–80% 80–90% >90% Maes: 30–40% 40–50% 50–60% Tie: 30–40% 40–50% No data
Governor before election
Bill Ritter
Democratic
Elected Governor
John Hickenlooper
Democratic

The 2010 Colorado gubernatorial election was held on Tuesday, November 2, 2010, to elect the governor of Colorado, who would serve a four-year term that began in January 2011. One-term incumbent Democrat Bill Ritter announced that he would not run for re-election in 2010. Dan Maes, backed by the Tea Party movement, won the Republican nomination in the primary with 50.6% of the vote and a 1.3% margin over rival Scott McInnis. In claiming victory, Maes called on former representative Tom Tancredo, running as the Constitution Party's nominee to "stop your campaign tonight." Denver mayor John Hickenlooper was unopposed for the Democratic nomination. Hickenlooper won the race with over 50% of the vote.

== Democratic primary ==
=== Candidates ===
==== Declared ====
- John Hickenlooper, mayor of Denver

==== Declined ====
- Bill Ritter, incumbent governor
- Andrew Romanoff, former speaker of the Colorado House of Representatives (ran for U.S. Senate)
- Ken Salazar, United States secretary of the interior and former U.S. senator

=== Results ===
Democratic primary results
Party	Candidate	Votes	%
Democratic	John Hickenlooper	303,245	100.00
Total votes		303,245	100.00

== Republican primary ==
=== Candidates ===
==== Declared ====
- Dan Maes, businessman
- Scott McInnis, former U.S. representative

==== Declined ====
- Josh Penry, state senator
- John Suthers, Colorado attorney general
- Tom Tancredo, former U.S. representative

=== Pre-primary polling and developments ===
While a head-to-head polling matchup of McInnis against Maes by Survey USA was not reported for July 2010, the McInnis plagiarism story and the entry of Tom Tancredo into the race led to a changed landscape in advance of the August 10 Republican primary. "When asked who would be the 'strongest Republican gubernatorial candidate,' ... Tancredo easily led the pack of six choices with 29 percent. McInnis followed with 19 percent, and ... Maes, had 13 percent. Another 17 percent ... were not sure", in the Survey USA poll commissioned by the Denver Post and 9News. While Tancredo's run was on the Constitution Party ticket, he spoke as a Republican in responding to the poll results. "Tancredo, originally a McInnis supporter, has said that both Maes and McInnis should 'both eventually drop out' of the race even if it's after one wins the primary. 'Neither can win the general election,' he said. Tancredo said he was 'surprised and flattered' by the poll results. 'I want us as a party to get this governor's seat,' he said. 'If I can do it, believe me, I will.'" Tancredo was delivered a "message, signed by the Tea Party movement, 9-12 Project, and constitutionalist groups, [which] read in part: 'Withdraw your ultimatum, stay in the Republican Party, let the process play out for the governor's race within the rules already set forth, and continue to help us improve this party, its candidates, and the process — in other words to trust and respect the newly awakened, energized and informed voters of Colorado.'" As of late July, both McInnis and Maes had rejected Tancredo's ultimatum that they withdraw before or after the primary. And "political observers — and even state GOP chairman Dick Wadhams — were already predicting [Tancredo]'s entry into the race sounded the death knell for the party's gubernatorial bid and may cause problems for state legislative races. 'It's difficult if not impossible to beat ... Hickenlooper with Tancredo in the race,' said Wadhams, noting that Tancredo will siphon just enough votes away from the GOP nominee to give Hickenlooper a win." Post-primary polling (see below), however, showed growing support for Tancredo with Maes in danger of receiving a vote share in the single digits.

==== McInnis vs. Maes ====
Poll source	Dates administered	Dan Maes	Scott McInnis
Public Policy Polling	August 7–8, 2010	40%	41%
Survey USA	August 1, 2010	43%	39%
Survey USA	June 15–17, 2010	29%	57%

=== Results ===
Results by county: Maes: 50–60%; 60–70%; McInnis: 50–60%; 60–70%; 70–80%

Republican primary results
Party	Candidate	Votes	%
Republican	Dan Maes	197,629	50.66
Republican	Scott McInnis	192,479	49.34
Total votes		390,108	100.00

== Libertarian Party ==
=== Candidates ===
- Jaimes Brown
- Dan "Kilo" Sallis, 2008 vice presidential candidate of the Boston Tea Party

=== Results ===
Libertarian primary results
Party	Candidate	Votes	%
Libertarian	Jaimes Brown	1,438	64.03
Libertarian	Dan Sallis	808	35.98
Total votes		2,246	100.00

== American Constitution Party ==
=== Confirmed ===
- Tom Tancredo, former Republican U.S. representative

== General election ==
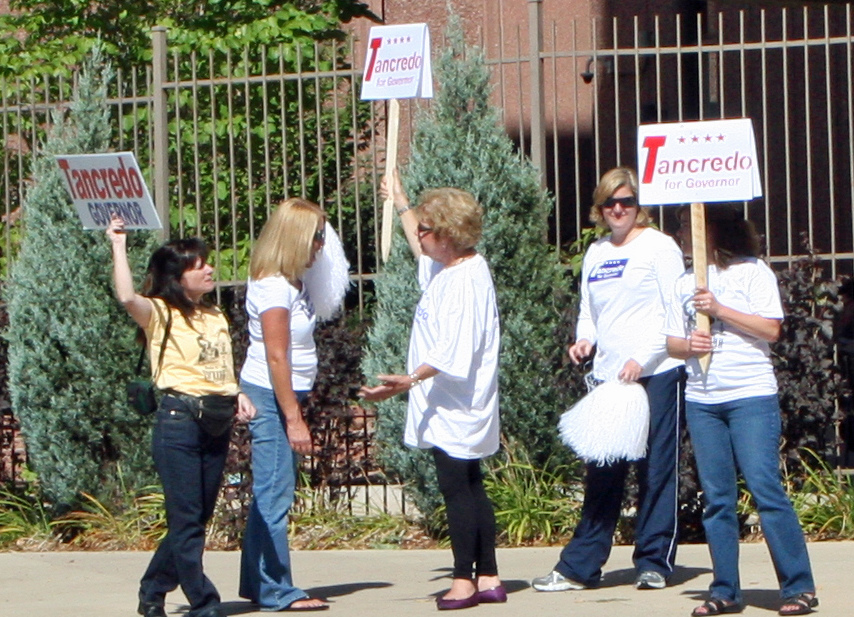
Tom Tancredo supporters

=== Candidates ===
- Jaimes Brown (L)

- Running mate: Ken Wyble

- Jason R. Clark (UAF)
- Paul Fiorino (I)

- Running mate: Heather McKibbin

- John Hickenlooper (D), mayor of Denver

- Running mate: Joseph Garcia, Colorado State University-Pueblo president

- Dan Maes (R), businessman

- Running mate: Tambor Williams, former state representative

- Tom Tancredo (ACP), former Republican U.S. representative

- Running mate: Pat Miller, former state representative and nominee for CO-02 in 1994 and 1996

=== Predictions ===
Source	Ranking	As of
Cook Political Report	Likely D	October 14, 2010
Rothenberg	Lean D	October 28, 2010
RealClearPolitics	Tossup	November 1, 2010
Sabato's Crystal Ball	Likely D	October 28, 2010
CQ Politics	Tossup	October 28, 2010

=== Debates ===
- Complete video of debate, September 25, 2010, C-SPAN
- Complete video of debate, October 29, 2010 - C-SPAN

=== Polling ===
Graphical summary

View source data.

Poll source	Dates administered	John Hickenlooper (D)	Dan Maes (R)	Tom Tancredo (ACP)
Public Policy Polling	October 30–31, 2010	47%	8%	43%
Rasmussen Reports	October 29, 2010	49%	5%	42%
Public Policy Polling	October 21–23, 2010	47%	5%	44%
Magellan Strategies	October 22, 2010	44%	9%	43%
Rasmussen Reports	October 15, 2010	42%	12%	38%
Rasmussen Reports	October 3, 2010	43%	16%	35%
Public Policy Polling	September 30 – October 2, 2010	47%	13%	33%
Survey USA	September 28–30, 2010	46%	15%	34%
Fox News	September 25, 2010	44%	15%	34%
CNN/Time	September 17–21, 2010	47%	21%	29%
Rasmussen Reports	September 14, 2010	46%	21%	25%
Rasmussen Reports	August 29, 2010	36%	24%	14%
Ipsos/Reuters	August 20–22, 2010	41%	33%	16%
Ipsos/Reuters	August 20–22, 2010	45%	45%	––
Rasmussen Reports	August 11, 2010	43%	31%	18%
Public Policy Polling	August 7–8, 2010	48%	23%	22%
Public Policy Polling	August 7–8, 2010	50%	38%	––
Rasmussen Reports	August 2, 2010	42%	27%	24%
Survey USA	July 27–29, 2010	46%	24%	24%
Survey USA	July 27–29, 2010	50%	41%	––
Rasmussen Reports	July 15, 2010	46%	43%	––
Survey USA	June 15–17, 2010	44%	45%	––
Rasmussen Reports	June 14, 2010	41%	41%	––

=== Results ===
County flips: Democratic Hold Flip / Republican Hold Flip / Constitution Flip

2010 Colorado gubernatorial election
Party	Candidate	Votes	%	±%
Democratic	John Hickenlooper	915,436	51.05%	−5.93%
Constitution	Tom Tancredo	652,376	36.38%	+35.76%
Republican	Dan Maes	199,792	11.14%	−29.02%
Libertarian	Jaimes Brown	13,365	0.75%	−0.75%
Independent	Jason R. Clark	8,601	0.48%	—
Independent	Paul Noel Fiorino	3,492	0.19%	—
Write-ins		86	0.00%	—
Majority		263,060	14.67%	−2.15%
Turnout		1,793,148		
Democratic hold				

==== By county ====
County	John Hickenlooper Democratic		Tom Tancredo Constitution		Dan Maes Republican		James Brown Libertarian		Jason R. Clark Independent		Paul Noel Fiorino Independent		Write-in		Margin		Total
County	Votes	%	Votes	%	Votes	%	Votes	%	Votes	%	Votes	%	Votes	%	Votes	%	Total
Adams	55,805	49.78%	44,738	39.90%	9,851	8.79%	735	0.66%	689	0.61%	289	0.26%	5	0.00%	11,067	9.87%	112,112
Alamosa	2,910	58.47%	1,079	21.68%	887	17.82%	48	0.96%	35	0.70%	18	0.36%	0	0.00%	1,831	36.79%	4,977
Arapahoe	104,147	52.56%	76,702	38.71%	15,011	7.57%	1,230	0.62%	776	0.39%	300	0.15%	0	0.00%	27,445	13.85%	198,166
Archuleta	2,133	41.51%	1,329	25.87%	1,554	30.25%	74	1.44%	31	0.60%	17	0.33%	0	0.00%	579 (Note: In counties Maes placed second, ahead of Tancredo and behind Hickenlooper, the margin given is Hickenlooper's vote and percentage minus Maes's vote and percentage.)	11.27%	5,138
Baca	667	34.03%	738	37.65%	512	26.12%	18	0.92%	19	0.97%	6	0.31%	0	0.00%	-71	-3.62%	1,960
Bent	743	46.12%	521	32.34%	314	19.49%	11	0.68%	16	0.99%	6	0.37%	0	0.00%	222	13.78%	1,611
Boulder	87,878	70.03%	29,368	23.40%	6,772	5.40%	1,074	0.86%	267	0.21%	125	0.10%	2	0.00%	58,510	46.63%	125,486
Broomfield	11,996	52.39%	8,666	37.85%	1,987	8.68%	143	0.62%	67	0.29%	39	0.17%	0	0.00%	3,330	14.54%	22,898
Chaffee	4,331	51.11%	2,708	31.96%	1,339	15.80%	44	0.52%	29	0.34%	23	0.27%	0	0.00%	1,323	15.61%	8,474
Cheyenne	237	24.66%	520	54.11%	195	20.29%	2	0.21%	4	0.42%	3	0.31%	0	0.00%	-283	-29.45%	961
Clear Creek	2,538	55.25%	1,724	37.53%	278	6.05%	29	0.63%	17	0.37%	8	0.17%	0	0.00%	814	17.72%	4,594
Conejos	1,747	55.90%	738	23.62%	598	19.14%	16	0.51%	17	0.54%	9	0.29%	0	0.00%	1,009	32.29%	3,125
Costilla	1,032	70.11%	237	16.10%	174	11.82%	12	0.82%	15	1.02%	2	0.14%	0	0.00%	795	54.01%	1,472
Crowley	517	39.56%	510	39.02%	245	18.75%	12	0.92%	21	1.61%	2	0.15%	0	0.00%	7	0.54%	1,307
Custer	796	35.05%	952	41.92%	478	21.05%	24	1.06%	17	0.75%	4	0.18%	0	0.00%	-156	-6.87%	2,271
Delta	4,469	34.06%	5,176	39.45%	3,158	24.07%	144	1.10%	112	0.85%	61	0.46%	1	0.01%	-707	-5.39%	13,121
Denver	142,645	74.35%	39,009	20.33%	8,068	4.21%	1,267	0.66%	552	0.29%	309	0.16%	3	0.00%	103,636	54.02%	191,853
Dolores	337	33.27%	283	27.94%	366	36.13%	15	1.48%	11	1.09%	1	0.10%	0	0.00%	-29 (Note: In counties Maes won and Hickenlooper placed second, the margin given is Hickenlooper's vote and percentage minus Maes's vote and percentage.)	-2.86%	1,013
Douglas	46,914	40.11%	56,093	47.96%	12,918	11.05%	624	0.53%	313	0.27%	90	0.08%	0	0.00%	-9,179	-7.85%	116,952
Eagle	8,557	58.63%	3,632	24.89%	2,168	14.86%	146	1.00%	61	0.42%	18	0.12%	12	0.08%	4,925	33.75%	14,594
El Paso	72,107	37.08%	83,580	42.98%	35,160	18.08%	1,779	0.91%	1,335	0.69%	492	0.25%	1	0.00%	-11,473	-5.90%	194,454
Elbert	2,761	25.06%	6,993	63.47%	1,156	10.49%	51	0.46%	44	0.40%	12	0.11%	0	0.00%	-4,232	-38.41%	11,017
Fremont	5,832	36.33%	6,371	39.69%	3,436	21.41%	171	1.07%	171	1.07%	70	0.44%	0	0.00%	-539	-3.36%	16,051
Garfield	8,624	48.04%	5,780	32.20%	3,242	18.06%	160	0.89%	118	0.66%	27	0.15%	0	0.00%	2,844	15.84%	17,951
Gilpin	1,373	51.29%	1,083	40.46%	176	6.57%	27	1.01%	12	0.45%	6	0.22%	0	0.00%	290	10.83%	2,677
Grand	3,196	48.59%	2,463	37.45%	831	12.63%	52	0.79%	23	0.35%	11	0.17%	1	0.02%	733	11.14%	6,577
Gunnison	3,859	61.07%	1,331	21.06%	1,023	16.19%	63	1.00%	27	0.43%	16	0.25%	0	0.00%	2,528	40.01%	6,319
Hinsdale	291	50.09%	141	24.27%	139	23.92%	6	1.03%	2	0.34%	2	0.34%	0	0.00%	150	25.82%	581
Huerfano	1,628	55.07%	801	27.10%	476	16.10%	17	0.58%	24	0.81%	10	0.34%	0	0.00%	827	27.98%	2,956
Jackson	302	39.27%	279	36.28%	175	22.76%	7	0.91%	6	0.78%	0	0.00%	0	0.00%	23	2.99%	769
Jefferson	116,120	50.80%	94,375	41.29%	15,419	6.75%	1,480	0.65%	780	0.34%	401	0.18%	1	0.00%	21,745	9.51%	228,576
Kiowa	204	26.67%	374	48.89%	167	21.83%	9	1.18%	8	1.05%	3	0.39%	0	0.00%	-170	-22.22%	765
Kit Carson	941	31.20%	1,450	48.08%	589	19.53%	13	0.43%	15	0.50%	8	0.27%	0	0.00%	-509	-16.88%	3,016
La Plata	10,869	53.30%	3,875	19.00%	5,186	25.43%	283	1.39%	122	0.60%	53	0.26%	4	0.02%	5,683	27.87%	20,392
Lake	1,243	56.32%	734	33.26%	192	8.70%	24	1.09%	10	0.45%	4	0.18%	0	0.00%	509	23.06%	2,207
Larimer	64,538	51.38%	45,397	36.14%	13,813	11.00%	1,012	0.81%	592	0.47%	248	0.20%	1	0.00%	19,141	15.24%	125,601
Las Animas	3,075	55.65%	1,420	25.70%	902	16.32%	50	0.90%	52	0.94%	27	0.49%	0	0.00%	1,655	29.95%	5,526
Lincoln	502	26.66%	1,064	56.51%	296	15.72%	4	0.21%	12	0.64%	5	0.27%	0	0.00%	-562	-29.85%	1,883
Logan	2,697	35.60%	3,547	46.82%	1,210	15.97%	47	0.62%	58	0.77%	17	0.22%	0	0.00%	-850	-11.22%	7,576
Mesa	19,869	36.42%	23,316	42.74%	9,870	18.09%	603	1.11%	621	1.14%	219	0.40%	51	0.09%	-3,447	-6.32%	54,549
Mineral	306	52.49%	127	21.78%	138	23.67%	9	1.54%	2	0.34%	1	0.17%	0	0.00%	168	28.82%	583
Moffat	1,021	22.14%	2,092	45.36%	1,393	30.20%	43	0.93%	46	1.00%	17	0.37%	0	0.00%	-699 (Note: In counties Tancredo won, Maes placed second, and Hickenlooper placed third; the margin given is Maes's vote and percentage minus Tancredo's vote and percentage)	-15.16%	4,612
Montezuma	3,570	37.17%	2,146	22.34%	3,644	37.94%	121	1.26%	92	0.96%	31	0.32%	1	0.01%	-74	-0.77%	9,605
Montrose	5,459	34.50%	5,893	37.25%	4,079	25.78%	187	1.18%	160	1.01%	41	0.26%	3	0.02%	-434	-2.74%	15,822
Morgan	2,789	33.81%	4,332	52.52%	1,025	12.43%	27	0.33%	58	0.70%	18	0.22%	0	0.00%	-1,543	-18.71%	8,249
Otero	2,894	45.11%	2,121	33.06%	1,286	20.04%	46	0.72%	56	0.87%	13	0.20%	0	0.00%	773	12.05%	6,416
Ouray	1,430	54.85%	655	25.12%	483	18.53%	23	0.88%	14	0.54%	2	0.08%	0	0.00%	775	29.73%	2,607
Park	3,006	39.64%	3,657	48.22%	809	10.67%	58	0.76%	38	0.50%	16	0.21%	0	0.00%	-651	-8.58%	7,584
Phillips	647	33.06%	931	47.57%	363	18.55%	7	0.36%	8	0.41%	1	0.05%	0	0.00%	-284	-14.51%	1,957
Pitkin	5,258	72.45%	954	13.15%	943	12.99%	74	1.02%	19	0.26%	9	0.12%	0	0.00%	4,304	59.31%	7,257
Prowers	1,388	36.85%	1,621	43.03%	712	18.90%	17	0.45%	22	0.58%	7	0.19%	0	0.00%	-233	-6.19%	3,767
Pueblo	30,862	57.44%	15,414	28.69%	6,608	12.30%	326	0.61%	376	0.70%	144	0.27%	0	0.00%	15,448	28.75%	53,730
Rio Blanco	578	22.33%	1,076	41.56%	890	34.38%	26	1.00%	16	0.62%	3	0.12%	0	0.00%	-186	-7.18%	2,589
Rio Grande	2,107	47.24%	1,384	31.03%	892	20.00%	41	0.92%	25	0.56%	11	0.25%	0	0.00%	723	16.21%	4,460
Routt	5,932	62.69%	1,989	21.02%	1,413	14.93%	87	0.92%	27	0.29%	14	0.15%	0	0.00%	3,943	41.67%	9,462
Saguache	1,482	61.57%	460	19.11%	398	16.54%	40	1.66%	16	0.66%	11	0.46%	0	0.00%	1,022	42.46%	2,407
San Juan	267	58.30%	90	19.65%	79	17.25%	17	3.71%	3	0.66%	2	0.44%	0	0.00%	177	38.65%	458
San Miguel	2,160	71.90%	372	12.38%	402	13.38%	55	1.83%	11	0.37%	4	0.13%	0	0.00%	1,758	58.52%	3,004
Sedgwick	466	41.64%	432	38.61%	199	17.78%	9	0.80%	8	0.71%	5	0.45%	0	0.00%	34	3.03%	1,119
Summit	6,455	64.10%	2,571	25.53%	919	9.13%	76	0.75%	34	0.34%	15	0.15%	0	0.00%	3,884	38.57%	10,070
Teller	3,168	32.24%	4,503	45.82%	1,995	20.30%	92	0.94%	55	0.56%	14	0.14%	0	0.00%	-1,335	-13.59%	9,827
Washington	533	23.10%	1,377	59.69%	375	16.25%	9	0.39%	12	0.52%	1	0.04%	0	0.00%	-844	-36.58%	2,307
Weld	32,056	40.16%	37,149	46.54%	9,652	12.09%	431	0.54%	384	0.48%	146	0.18%	0	0.00%	-5,093	-6.38%	79,818
Yuma	1,172	29.97%	1,933	49.44%	764	19.54%	18	0.46%	18	0.46%	5	0.13%	0	0.00%	-761	-19.46%	3,910

===== Counties that flipped from Republican to Constitution =====
- Baca (largest city: Springfield)
- Cheyenne (largest city: Cheyenne Wells)
- Moffat (largest city: Craig)
- Rio Blanco (largest city: Meeker)
- Mesa (largest city: Grand Junction)
- Delta (largest city: Delta)
- Montrose (largest city: Montrose)
- Park (largest city: Fairplay)
- Fremont (largest city: Canon City)
- Custer (largest city: Silver Cliff)
- El Paso (largest city: Colorado Springs)
- Douglas (largest city: Highlands Ranch)
- Teller (largest city: Woodland Park)
- Morgan (largest city: Fort Morgan)
- Logan (largest city: Sterling)
- Phillips (largest city: Holyoke)
- Washington (largest city: Akron)
- Lincoln (largest city: Limon)
- Elbert (largest city: Elizabeth)
- Yuma (largest city: Yuma)
- Prowers (largest city: Lamar)
- Kit Carson (largest city: Burlington)
- Kiowa (largest city: Eads)

===== Counties that flipped from Republican to Democratic =====
- Jackson (largest city: Walden)
- Crowley (largest city: Ordway)

===== Counties that flipped from Democratic to Republican =====
- Dolores (largest city: Dove Creek)

===== Counties that flipped from Democratic to Constitution =====
- Weld (largest city: Greeley)

==== By congressional district ====
Hickenlooper won five of seven congressional districts, including two that elected Republicans, with the remaining two going to Tancredo, which both elected Republicans.

District	Hickenlooper	Maes	Tancredo	Representative
1st	73%	5%	22%	Diana DeGette
2nd	62%	7%	30%	Jared Polis
3rd	49%	20%	32%	Scott Tipton
4th	46%	12%	41%	Cory Gardner
5th	38%	18%	43%	Doug Lamborn
6th	45.1%	9%	45.2%	Mike Coffman
7th	53%	7%	38%	Ed Perlmutter

== Aftermath ==
A result of Tancredo's ACP candidacy and Maes' political implosion was the party's legal elevation from minor to major party status.

Under state law, Tancredo's showing in the gubernatorial election elevated the American Constitution Party from minor to major party status. Any party that earns 10% or more of the votes cast for governor is a "major party." Major party status gives the party a place at or near the top of the ballot in the 2014 gubernatorial election. However, because of the additional organizational, financial, and compliance requirements triggered by major party status, ACP leaders have been ambivalent about the change.

As the campaign wore on, the question was not whether Hickenlooper would win, but whether Maes would get at least 10% of the vote. Had he dropped below 10%, the Republican Party would have been legally defined as a minor party under Colorado law. Maes' campaign received no financial support from the Colorado GOP, RNC, nor the Republican Governor's Association. Ultimately, he finished with 11 percent of the vote, just 20,477 votes over the threshold, allowing the Colorado GOP to retain major party status.

The Constitution Party did not field a candidate in the 2014 election, and thus lost its major party status.

== See also ==
- Colorado Democratic Party
- Colorado Republican Party
- American Constitution Party
- Libertarian Party of Colorado
- 2010 Colorado elections
