= Tambor Williams =

American politician (born 1941)

Executive Director of the Colorado Department of Regulatory Agencies
- In office August 2, 2004 – January 9, 2007
- Governor: Bill Owens
- Preceded by: Rick O'Donnell
- Succeeded by: D. Rico Munn

Member of the Colorado House of Representatives from the 50th district
- In office January 1997 – August 2, 2004
- Preceded by: Pat Sullivan
- Succeeded by: Pamela Groeger

Personal details
- Born: March 28, 1941 (age 85) Washington, D.C.
- Party: Republican
- Other political affiliations: Democratic (formerly)
- Spouse: Jim Eckersley
- Children: 2
- Education: Queens College; Western State College of Colorado; University of Colorado Law School

Tambor Williams (born March 28, 1941) is an American politician. She served in the Colorado House of Representatives from 1997 until 2004, and was the Republican nominee for Lieutenant Governor of Colorado in 2010.

== Biography ==
Williams was born in Washington, D.C. in 1941. She received a Bachelor of Arts from Queens College in 1962, a Master of Arts from Western State College of Colorado in 1971, and a Juris Doctor from the University of Colorado Law School in 1982. Prior to law school, Williams worked as a teacher, school counselor, and university administrator.

Williams registered as a Democrat for a short time, as her partner was running for sheriff as a Democrat.

Williams was elected as a Republican to the Colorado House of Representatives in 1996, from Weld County. She served until 2004, when she was appointed by Governor Bill Owens as executive director of the Colorado Department of Regulatory Agencies.

In August 2010, Williams was selected by gubernatorial candidate Dan Maes to be his running mate. The ticket finished third in the general election.

== Personal life ==
Williams and her husband, Jim Eckersley, have two children: Jennifer and Bill.

== Political positions ==
Williams identifies as pro-life, supporting abortion only in certain cases; although in 1997 she opposed a bill which would have banned partial-birth abortion in the state of Colorado.

== Electoral history ==
Colorado House District 50 Republican primary, 1996
Party	Candidate	Votes	%
Republican	Tambor Williams	1,269	66.0%
Republican	Norman G. Johnson	653	34.0%
Total votes		1,922	100.0%

Colorado House District 50 election, 1996
Party	Candidate	Votes	%
Republican	Tambor Williams	7,659	53.8%
Democratic	Jim Riesberg	6,579	46.2%
Total votes		14,238	100.0%

Colorado House District 50 Republican primary, 1998
Party	Candidate	Votes	%
Republican	Tambor Williams	1,406	56.9%
Republican	Lea Faulkner	1,051	42.6%
Write-in		12	0.5%
Total votes		2,469	100.0%

Colorado House District 50 election, 1998
Party	Candidate	Votes	%
Republican	Tambor Williams	6,046	55.2%
Democratic	Warren Lasell	4,850	44.3%
Write-in		49	0.4%
Total votes		10,945	100.0%

Colorado House District 50 Republican primary, 2000
Party	Candidate	Votes	%
Republican	Tambor Williams	765	100.0%
Total votes		765	100.0%

Colorado House District 50 election, 2000
Party	Candidate	Votes	%
Republican	Tambor Williams	9,566	74.9%
Libertarian	Russ J. Haddad	3,208	25.1%
Total votes		12,774	100.0%

Colorado House District 50 Republican primary, 2002
Party	Candidate	Votes	%
Republican	Tambor Williams	2,372	100.0%
Total votes		2,372	100.0%

Colorado House District 50 election, 2002
Party	Candidate	Votes	%
Republican	Tambor Williams	9,370	77.6%
Libertarian	Lester W. Edgett	2,712	22.4%
Total votes		12,082	100.0%

Colorado gubernatorial election, 2010
Party	Candidate	Votes	%
Democratic	John Hickenlooper/Joseph Garcia	915,436	51.1%
Constitution	Tom Tancredo/Pat Miller	652,376	36.4%
Republican	Dan Maes/Tambor Williams	199,792	11.1%
Libertarian	Jaimes Brown/Ken Wyble	13,365	0.7%
Independent	Jason R. Clark	8,601	0.5%
Independent	Paul Fiorino/Heather McKibbin	3,492	0.2%
Write-in		86	<0.1%
Total votes		1,793,148	100.0%

Party political offices
Preceded by Janet Rowland	Republican nominee for Lieutenant Governor of Colorado; 2010	Succeeded by Jill Repella
