= Holy Family High School (Colorado) =

Catholic high school in Colorado, US

Location
- 5195 West 144th Avenue; Broomfield, Colorado 80023; United States; 39°57′33″N 105°2′59″W

Information
- Type: Private, Coeducational
- Motto: "Spirit, Mind, Body"
- Religious affiliation: Catholic Church
- Established: 1922 (104 years ago)
- School district: Archdiocese of Denver
- Superintendent: Elias Moo
- CEEB code: 060415
- Staff: 52
- Grades: 9–12
- Enrollment: 740 (2022)
- Campus size: 2 acres (8,100 m^{2})
- Colors: Purple and gold
- Athletics: 4A
- Athletics conference: Northern Colorado Athletic Conference
- Team name: Tigers
- Accreditation: North Central Association of Colleges and Schools
- Newspaper: The Lamp Post
- Yearbook: Vista
- Website: www.holyfamilyhs.com

Holy Family High School in Broomfield, Colorado, is a Catholic college-preparatory high school located in the technology corridor between Denver and Boulder. The school is operated under the auspices of the Roman Catholic Archdiocese of Denver.

== History ==
Holy Family High School was established in 1922 as a parish high school. The first commencement was held in 1926. Staffed by the Sisters of Loretto and dedicated lay teachers, the school added a second building in 1956 to meet the demands of increasing enrollment.

In 1958 Holy Family changed its affiliation from a parish high school to an archdiocesan secondary school and was one of four Catholic high schools to serve the urban geographical region of North Denver. By the 1980s it was apparent that expansion to a new location was essential to continue its mission of educating young men and women. A 52-acre (210,000 m^{2}) site was secured by the school and the Archdiocese of Denver and the groundbreaking was held in March 1998. The doors to the new campus building were opened in August 1999 in sprawling Broomfield, Colorado. The new facility features a chapel, 22 classrooms, four science laboratories, a multimedia library, a wireless network, two technology centers, athletic practice and playing fields, and the lighted Mike G. Gabriel football stadium.

In 2008, a new larger than life statue of the Holy Family was dedicated. In 2020 Holy Family added a 34,000 sq ft. addition including Engineering rooms, classrooms, a new Auxiliary gym, and renovated many of its other facilities. Holy Family has 65 faculty members, giving the school a 11:1 student/faculty ratio. Over 75% of the faculty holds a Master's or other advanced degrees. Over $1 million of tuition assistance and scholarships were awarded for the 2020-2021 school year. (42% of the student body).

== Academics ==
A total of 30 credits are required for graduation for the class of 2024. An Honors Diploma is earned by acquiring 30 or more credits with a 4.0 GPA or better in a curriculum which includes at least eight honors or advanced placement courses and completion of a summary project. Apostolic Ministry is required of each student, beginning with service to family, school and culminating with two years of service experience outside the school. Spiritual Retreats are held for every class level and Holy Family juniors participate in the Kairos retreat program. Prayer is an integral part of the daily experience. Masses are celebrated monthly for the entire school community. Optional weekly masses are celebrated on Thursday mornings. Small group masses are available frequently.

== Athletics ==
The Holy Family Tigers compete in the Colorado High School Activities Association (CHSAA) 4A or 3A division of the Northern Colorado Athletic Conference. Team members must be academically eligible to participate. The Tigers have earned state titles in girls' basketball (2008, 2009, 2010, 2011, 2013, and 2014), boys' basketball (1976, 1998, and 2014), football (2002, 2005, and 2023), softball (2006 and 2018), girls' cross country (2012), girls' soccer (2021), and baseball (2010, 2013, and 2014). Fall sports: cross country, football, boys' golf, soccer, spirit team, softball, volleyball. Winter sports: girls' and boys' basketball, wrestling, Girls' Swimming, and spirit team. Spring sports: baseball, boys' and girls' lacrosse, track and field, girls' soccer, girls' tennis, girls' golf.

== Notable alumni ==
- Tom Tancredo, former five-term Republican U.S. Representative of Colorado's 6th congressional district from 1999 to 2009, 2008 presidential candidate, and Constitution candidate for Governor in 2010 election.
