= Barbara O'Brien =

American politician

Barbara O’Brien
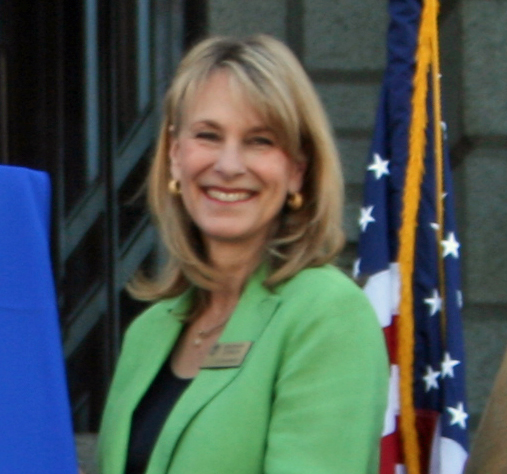

47th Lieutenant Governor of Colorado
- In office January 9, 2007 – January 11, 2011
- Governor: Bill Ritter
- Preceded by: Jane Norton
- Succeeded by: Joseph Garcia

Personal details
- Born: Barbara O'Brien; April 18, 1950 (age 76) Brawley, California, U.S.
- Party: Democratic
- Spouse: Richard O'Brien
- Profession: Charity president

Barbara O'Brien (born April 18, 1950) was the 47th Lieutenant Governor of Colorado from 2007 to 2011. She is a member of the Democratic Party. She previously served eight years as an elected member of the board of Denver Public Schools from 2013 to 2021.

== Political career ==
=== Lieutenant Governor of Colorado ===
She was chosen as running mate by Bill Ritter, the Democratic candidate for Governor of Colorado in the 2006 election. The Ritter/O'Brien ticket won with 57% of the vote. As lieutenant governor she made education her signature issue. Ritter chose not to run for re-election in 2010, and O'Brien also stepped down at the end of her term.

Prior to becoming lieutenant governor, she was a speechwriter and policy advisor for Governor Richard Lamm.

=== Denver School Board Director ===
Barbara O'Brien was elected as the at-large school director of the Denver Public Schools School Board on November 5, 2013, claiming 59.5% of the vote and winning over Michael Kiley and Joan Poston. and was reelected in November 2017 to another term.

The Denver Post newspaper stated that candidates who promised reform won the majority of local school board elections across Colorado in the November 2013 off-year election, and that O'Brien, as well as her fellow winners for Denver School Board positions, were reform candidates.

== Business career ==
As of March 2012, O'Brien was a senior fellow at the Piton Foundation, which uses its private funding to develop, manage, and incubate programs to create opportunities for lower-income families in Denver.

In 2013, O'Brien was named President of Get Smart Schools, a Denver-based public education reform group.

== Personal ==
O'Brien is married to Richard O'Brien, and has two sons, Jared and Connor.

== See also ==
- List of female lieutenant governors in the United States

Political offices
| Preceded by Jane Norton | Lieutenant Governor of Colorado; January 9, 2007 – January 11, 2011 | Succeeded by Joseph Garcia |
