= Jeannie Ritter =

American First Lady of Colorado (born 1958)

- Jeannie Ritter in La Junta, Colorado

First Lady of Colorado
- In role January 9, 2007 – January 11, 2011
- Governor: Bill Ritter
- Preceded by: Frances Owens
- Succeeded by: Helen Thorpe

Personal details
- Born: June 14, 1958 (age 68) Arlington, Virginia, U.S.
- Party: Democratic
- Spouse: Bill Ritter (m. 1983)
- Children: 4
- Education: University of Northern Colorado
- Profession: Special education Mental health

Jeannie Rita Ritter (born 14 June 1958) is an American educator and activist who served as the First Lady of Colorado from 2007 until 2011. She is married to former Colorado Governor Bill Ritter.

Ritter has helped to raise awareness regarding mental health, citing that her perspective on mental health was influenced by her training as a teacher for emotionally disturbed children and having an older sister who has bipolar disorder. She previously had served in the Peace Corps in Tunisia.

== See also ==
- 2006 Colorado gubernatorial election
