= Pat Miller (politician) =

American politician (born 1947)

Member of the Colorado House of Representatives from the 27th district
- In office January 1991 – January 1993
- Preceded by: Jim Pierson
- Succeeded by: Jim Pierson

Personal details
- Born: March 20, 1947 (age 79) Peoria, Illinois
- Party: Republican
- Other political affiliations: Democratic (formerly); American Constitution (2010)
- Spouse: Richard Lynn Miller
- Children: 1

Patricia Elaine Miller (born March 20, 1947) is an American politician. She served in the Colorado House of Representatives as a Republican from 1991 until 1993, and was the candidate of the American Constitution Party for Lieutenant Governor of Colorado in 2010.

== Biography ==
Miller was born in 1947 in Peoria, Illinois, and graduated from Lowpoint-Washburn High School in 1965. A former Democrat, she became a Republican after moving to Colorado in 1971 and reading the party platforms. In 1990, Miller was elected to represent the 27th district (which covered parts of Jefferson County) in the Colorado House of Representatives, serving one term before losing reelection in 1992. She ran for Colorado's 2nd congressional district in 1994 and 1996, both times losing to incumbent Democrat David Skaggs.

In 2010, Miller was selected as the Constitution Party's nominee for Lieutenant Governor of Colorado. Tom Tancredo had replaced Ben Goss as the party's candidate for governor, although Goss's running mate, Doug Campbell, initially remained on the ticket. Campbell withdrew from the race in order to allow Tancredo to select his own running mate. He announced his selection of Miller on a KHOW talk radio program on August 24, 2010. Tancredo and Miller lost the election to Democrats John Hickenlooper and Joseph Garcia.

During the 2012 Republican presidential primaries, Miller supported Rick Santorum, and she served on his campaign's Colorado Steering Committee.

In 2019, Miller announced that she was running for the position of State Representative in Colorado House District 63. She lost the Republican primary to Dan Woog.

== Personal life ==
In addition to politics, Miller is also an author. As of 2020, she has published six works of historical fiction and one mystery novel. In the fall of 2018, Miller's fifth book, Willfully Ignorant, received the second-place Grand Prize in the Xulon Press Christian Author Awards Book Contest.

Miller and her husband, Richard Lynn Miller, have one adopted son and two grandchildren. She resides in Erie, Colorado.

== Political positions ==
Miller opposes abortion. Between 1998 and 2004, she was director of Citizens for Responsible Government, an anti-abortion organization. In 2007, she co-founded Colorado Citizens for Life.

Miller stated she had a "strong conservative voting record", and opposes gun control. She is also opposed to illegal immigration, saying, "In the line at the grocery store, I hear people complaining about the immigration laws and the drain on taxpayers and the loss of jobs. I feel like we're handing over our country. It's very distressing to me."

== Electoral history ==
Colorado House District 27 Republican primary, 1990
Party	Candidate	Votes	%
Republican	Pat Miller	2,482	56.1%
Republican	Bob Dyer	1,941	43.9%
Total votes		4,423	100.0%

Colorado House District 27 election, 1990
Party	Candidate	Votes	%
Republican	Pat Miller	9,156	50.2%
Democratic	Jim Pierson	9,098	49.8%
Total votes		18,254	100.0%

Colorado House District 27 election, 1992
Party	Candidate	Votes	%
Democratic	Jim Pierson	14,988	56.1%
Republican	Pat Miller	11,736	43.9%
Total votes		26,724	100.0%

Colorado's 2nd congressional district Republican primary, 1994
Party	Candidate	Votes	%
Republican	Pat Miller	8,197	38.1%
Republican	Michelle Lawrence	5,128	23.9%
Republican	Ted Engel	4,722	22.0%
Republican	Sharon Klusman	3,452	16.1%
Total votes		21,499	100.0%

Colorado's 2nd congressional district election, 1994
Party	Candidate	Votes	%
Democratic	David Skaggs	105,938	56.7%
Republican	Pat Miller	80,723	43.2%
Write-in	Larry E. Johnson	44	<0.1%
Total votes		168,705	100.0%

Colorado's 2nd congressional district Republican primary, 1996
Party	Candidate	Votes	%
Republican	Pat Miller	19,216	65.4%
Republican	Shannon Robinson	10,181	34.6%
Total votes		29,397	100.0%

Colorado's 2nd congressional district election, 1996
Party	Candidate	Votes	%
Democratic	David Skaggs	145,894	57.0%
Republican	Pat Miller	97,865	38.3%
Reform	Larry E. Johnson	6,304	2.5%
Libertarian	W. Earl Allen	5,721	2.2%
Total votes		255,784	100.0%

Colorado gubernatorial election, 2010
Party	Candidate	Votes	%
Democratic	John Hickenlooper/Joseph Garcia	915,436	51.1%
Constitution	Tom Tancredo/Pat Miller	652,376	36.4%
Republican	Dan Maes/Tambor Williams	199,792	11.1%
Libertarian	Jaimes Brown/Ken Wyble	13,365	0.7%
Independent	Jason R. Clark	8,601	0.5%
Independent	Paul Fiorino/Heather McKibbin	3,492	0.2%
Write-in		86	<0.1%
Total votes		1,793,148	100.0%

Party political offices
Preceded by Doug Campbell (withdrawn); Tracy Davison	Constitution nominee for Lieutenant Governor of Colorado; 2010	Most recent
