= Wilma Webb =

American politician (born 1944)

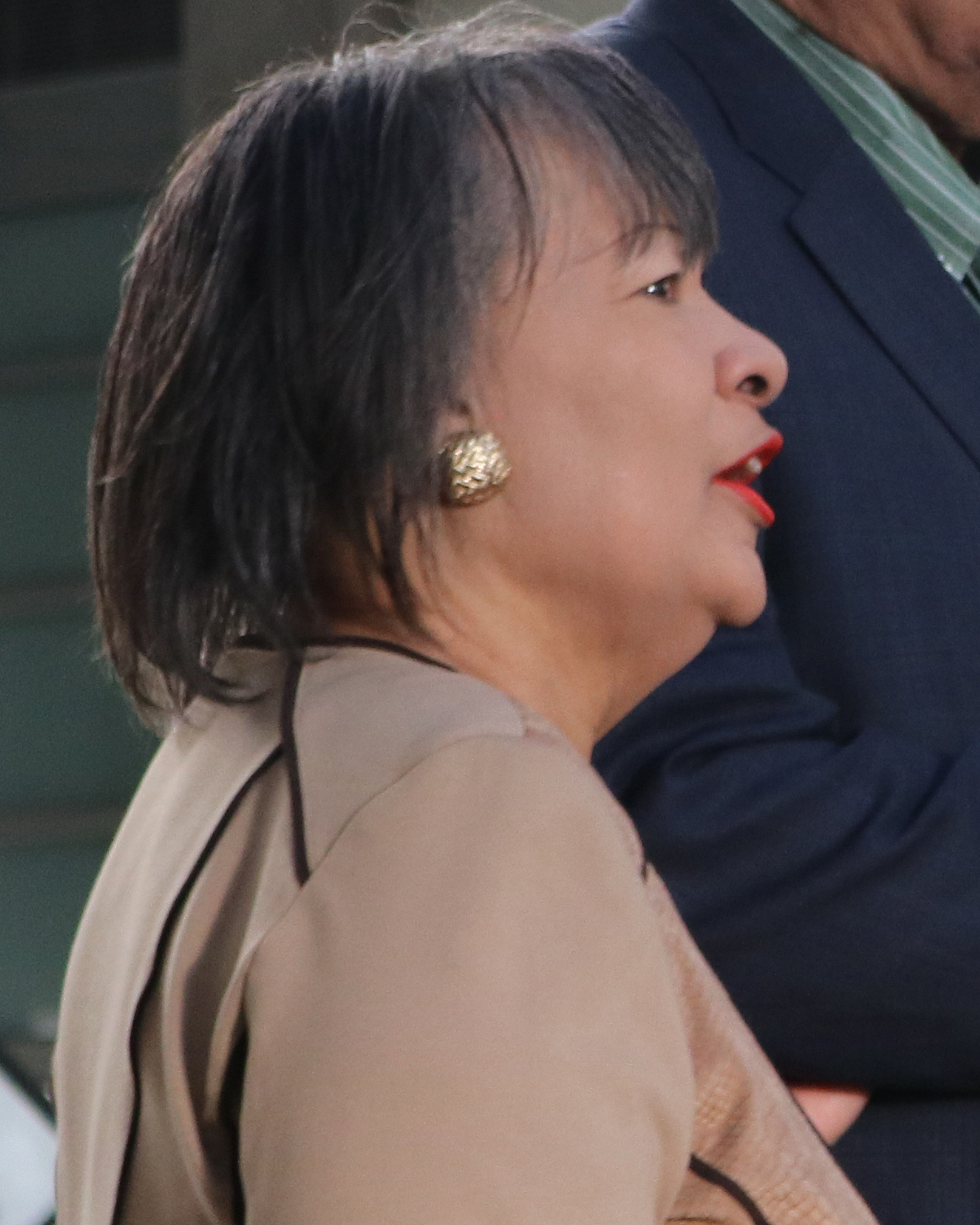

First Lady of Denver
- In office July 15, 1991 – July 21, 2003
- Preceded by: Ellen Hart Peña
- Succeeded by: Helen Thorpe

Member of the Colorado House of Representatives from the 8th district
- In office 1980–1993

Personal details
- Born: 1944 (age 81–82) Denver, Colorado, U.S.
- Spouse: Wellington Webb (m. 1969)
- Children: 4

Wilma J. Webb (born 1944) is an American politician who was a member of the Colorado General Assembly from 1980 to 1993. A Democrat, she represented Denver County in the Colorado House of Representatives. She sponsored dozens of bills including school reform and equality initiatives. She is best known for sponsoring legislation that adopted Martin Luther King Jr.'s birthday as a Colorado state holiday before it became the federal Martin Luther King Jr. Day holiday, and for her efforts to educate the young about King's legacy.

== Early life and education ==
Webb was born in Denver, Colorado, to Faye and Frank Gerdine. She attended the University of Colorado Denver without obtaining a degree. As a state legislator, she attended the Harvard Kennedy School in 1988.

== Career ==
She married Wellington Webb in 1969. He later became the first African American mayor of Denver, in office from 1991 to 2003. She was the first First Lady of Denver to have held political office herself.

During her time in the Colorado House of Representatives, she became the first African-American member of the legislature's Joint Budget Committee (the legislature's most powerful six-member committee), helping write the state's $4 billion budget in 1981,

She has been recognized by several organizations including the National Education Association. She was inducted into the Colorado Women's Hall of Fame in 1991.

== Personal life ==
She and her husband have four adult children. She is a member of Zion Baptist Church of Denver, Colorado, and of the Delta Sigma Theta sorority.
