= Helen Thorpe =

American journalist (born 1963)

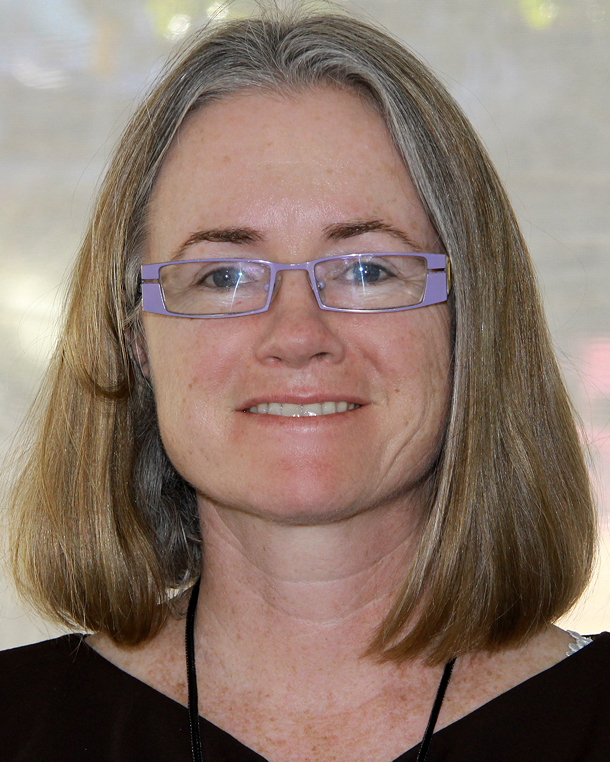
- Thorpe in 2014

First Lady of Colorado
- In role January 11, 2011 – January 2015
- Governor: John Hickenlooper
- Preceded by: Jeannie Ritter
- Succeeded by: Robin Pringle (2016)

First Lady of Denver
- In role July 21, 2003 – January 11, 2011
- Preceded by: Wilma Webb
- Succeeded by: Gabriela Vidal

Personal details
- Born: January 23, 1963 (age 63) London, England
- Spouse: John Hickenlooper (m. 2002; div. 2015)
- Children: 1
- Education: Princeton University, Columbia University
- Occupation: Author, Journalist, First Lady of Colorado

Helen Thorpe (born January 23, 1963) is an American author and freelance journalist who was the First Lady of Colorado following her husband's inauguration until their divorce in 2015. She has written for major American newspapers and magazines, and has authored four books.

== Early life ==
Thorpe was born in London, England to Irish parents and was raised in Medford, New Jersey. Thorpe's father, Larry, was born in Dublin. Her mother is from Virginia, County Cavan, Ireland.

== Education ==
Thorpe attended Princeton University, graduating magna cum laude. In 1989, she attended Columbia University as a graduate student, receiving a master's degree in English literature.

== Career ==
Some of her first jobs following her graduation from Princeton were in Boston, working as an intern at the Atlantic Monthly. She then worked for a short time at both The New York Observer as a staff writer, and then, having caught the attention of editor Tina Brown, for New Yorker Magazine. In 1994, she was hired by Texas Monthly and moved to Austin. She left the magazine in 1999.

Her stories have also been published in George, New York, Westword, The New York Times Magazine, and 5280. She wrote Talk of the Town for The New Yorker, and has written for Slate and Harper's Bazaar.

Thorpe also published four books. Her first book, Just Like Us, follows the lives of four Denver girls of Mexican ancestry and deals with aspects of immigration into the United States. It was published by Scribner in 2009. It subsequently won the Colorado Book Award and was named one of the best books published that year by the Washington Post. Her second book, Soldier Girls, was published by Scribner in 2014. It describes the experiences of three women who enlisted in the Army National Guard before 9/11. The three women had anticipated only part-time military service but ultimately served deployments in both Iraq and Afghanistan. Soldier Girls was named the number one nonfiction book of that year by Time Magazine. Her third book, The Newcomers, follows 22 newly-arrived teenagers from nations racked by drought, famine, or war, recording their first year in America as they take a beginner-level English Language Acquisition class at South High School in Denver. It was published by Scribner in 2017. Thorpe explores what it means to "be American" while learning these refugee students' stories, presenting a perspective on the issues of immigration, multiculturalism, and America's role on the global stage. The Newcomers won the Colorado Book Award for narrative nonfiction, was named a finalist for the J. Anthony Lukas Work-in-Progress Award, and was a finalist for the Dayton Literary Peace Prize. Her fourth book, Finding Motherland, is a collection of linked essays about family, food, and migration. It was published as a digital-only offering in 2020.

Some of Thorpe's stories have also aired on the radio shows This American Life and Soundprint. In addition, Just Like Us was adapted for the stage by the Denver Center for the Performing Arts, and Soldier Girls was optioned by HBO and Julia Louis-Dreyfus as a potential miniseries.

Thorpe teaches narrative nonfiction at Lighthouse Writers Workshop and Regis University. She has also taught at Colorado College as a visiting professor in the journalism program. Thorpe is a board member of the Museum of Contemporary Art Denver.

== Personal life ==
Thorpe met John Hickenlooper in 2000 at her 37th birthday party while she was living in Texas. They married in January 2002 in a Quaker wedding ceremony in Austin. In July 2012, the couple announced plans to separate amicably after 10 years of marriage, and they divorced in January 2015.

== Works ==
- 2009 – Just Like Us: The True Story of Four Mexican Girls Coming of Age in America
- 2014 – Soldier Girls: The Battles of Three Women at Home and at War
- 2017 – The Newcomers: Finding Refuge, Friendship, and Hope in an American Classroom
- 2020 – Finding Motherland: Essays about Family, Food, and Migration
