= Bill Ritter =

41st Governor of Colorado

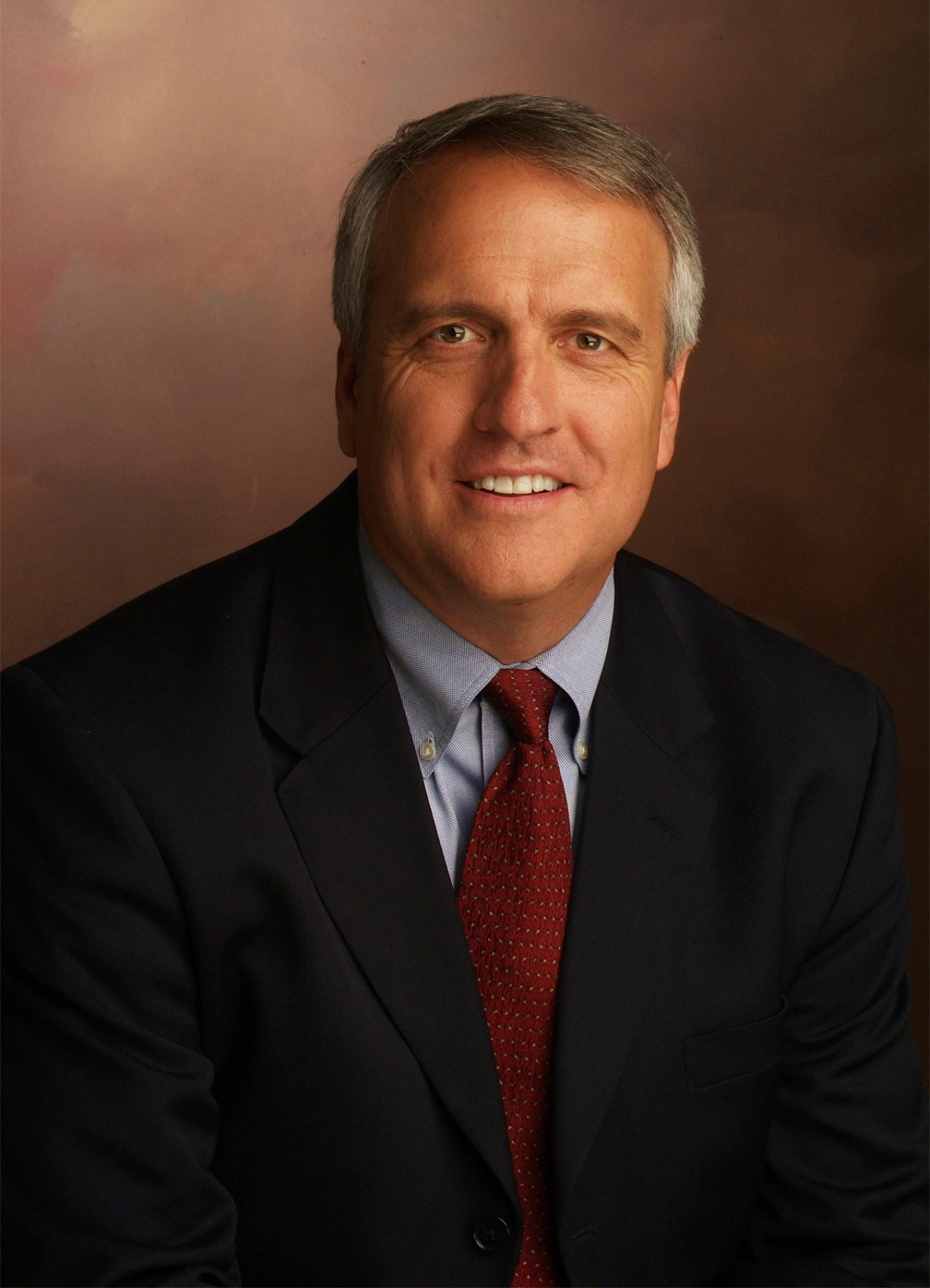
- Ritter in 2007

41st Governor of Colorado
- In office January 9, 2007 – January 11, 2011
- Lieutenant: Barbara O'Brien
- Preceded by: Bill Owens
- Succeeded by: John Hickenlooper

District Attorney of Denver
- In office June 1993 – January 11, 2005
- Appointed by: Roy Romer
- Preceded by: Norm Early
- Succeeded by: Mitchell R. Morrissey

Personal details
- Born: August William Ritter Jr. September 6, 1956 (age 70) Denver, Colorado, U.S.
- Party: Democratic
- Spouse: Jeannie Ritter (m. 1983)
- Children: 4
- Education: Colorado State University, Fort Collins (BA); University of Colorado, Boulder (JD)

August William Ritter Jr. (born September 6, 1956) is an American politician and lawyer who served as the 41st governor of Colorado from 2007 to 2011. A member of the Democratic Party, he served as the district attorney for Denver before his election to the governorship in 2006.

Ritter was the first Colorado-born person to be elected as governor of Colorado since 1975, as well as being the first Democratic officeholder in 50 years to serve with a Democratic majority in the Colorado General Assembly. Ritter did not run for a second term in 2010, citing family reasons. He supported fellow Democrat John Hickenlooper, who was elected to the governorship.

== Early life ==
Ritter was raised on a farm in Aurora, Colorado, with 11 brothers and sisters; he was sixth-oldest. His parents were Ethel and August William Ritter. He attended Gateway High School while he lived in Aurora. He also attended St. Anthony Catholic High School in San Antonio, Texas, from 1970 to 1972.

At 14 years old, he went to work full-time in the construction industry, and joined a local labor union. He continued to work in the construction field prior to college.

Ritter enrolled in Colorado State University and completed a bachelor's degree, and then pursued a degree at the University of Colorado School of Law in Boulder. By 1981, he had earned a Juris Doctor. That year he was hired as a Deputy District Attorney in the Denver District Attorney's Office.

== Career in law ==
In 1990, Ritter took a position in the United States Attorney's office. He returned to the Deputy District Attorney's office two years later. In 1993, Ritter was appointed as Denver's District Attorney. As DA, he created one of the nation's first drug courts, as well as taking on white collar crime in metropolitan Denver. He worked extensively on the prosecution of sexual abuse and domestic violence, as well as criminals targeting senior citizens.

Ritter advised United States Attorney General John Ashcroft on affairs after the September 11 attacks.

== Charity work ==
Ritter served on the Denver Foundation's Human Services Committee, the Mile High United Way Board, and the Denver Public Schools' Commission on Secondary School Reform.

In 1987, Ritter and his wife Jeannie moved to Zambia as missionaries for the Catholic Church. They opened a food distribution and education center. Upon their return to the Denver area in 1989, Governor Roy Romer appointed Ritter to the DA's office, citing his missionary work as an "important factor" in the decision.

During the 2006 gubernatorial campaign, Ritter's campaign and the press often noted his work in Zambia.

== Governorship ==
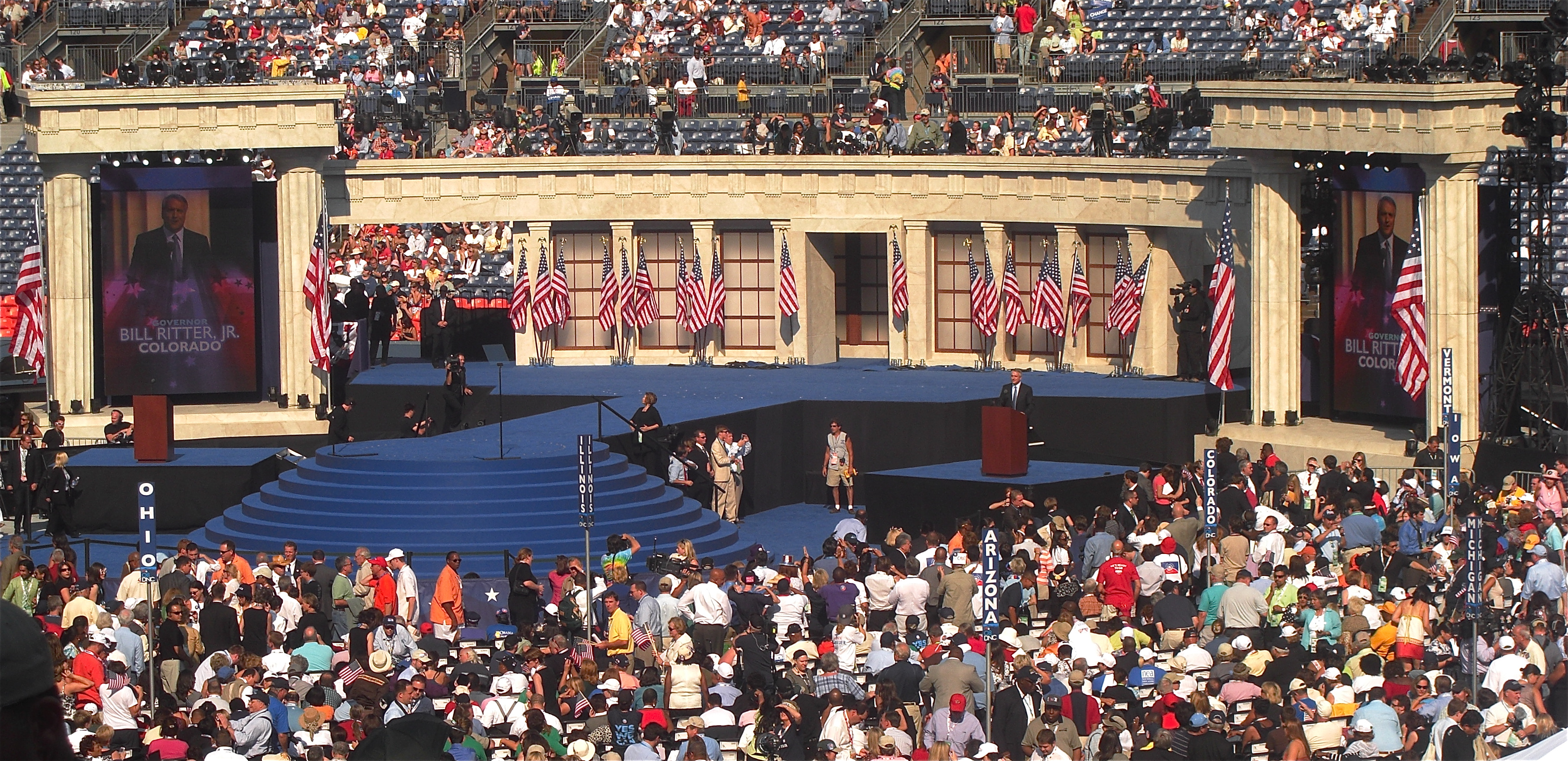
Ritter speaks during the final day of the 2008 Democratic National Convention in Denver, Colorado.

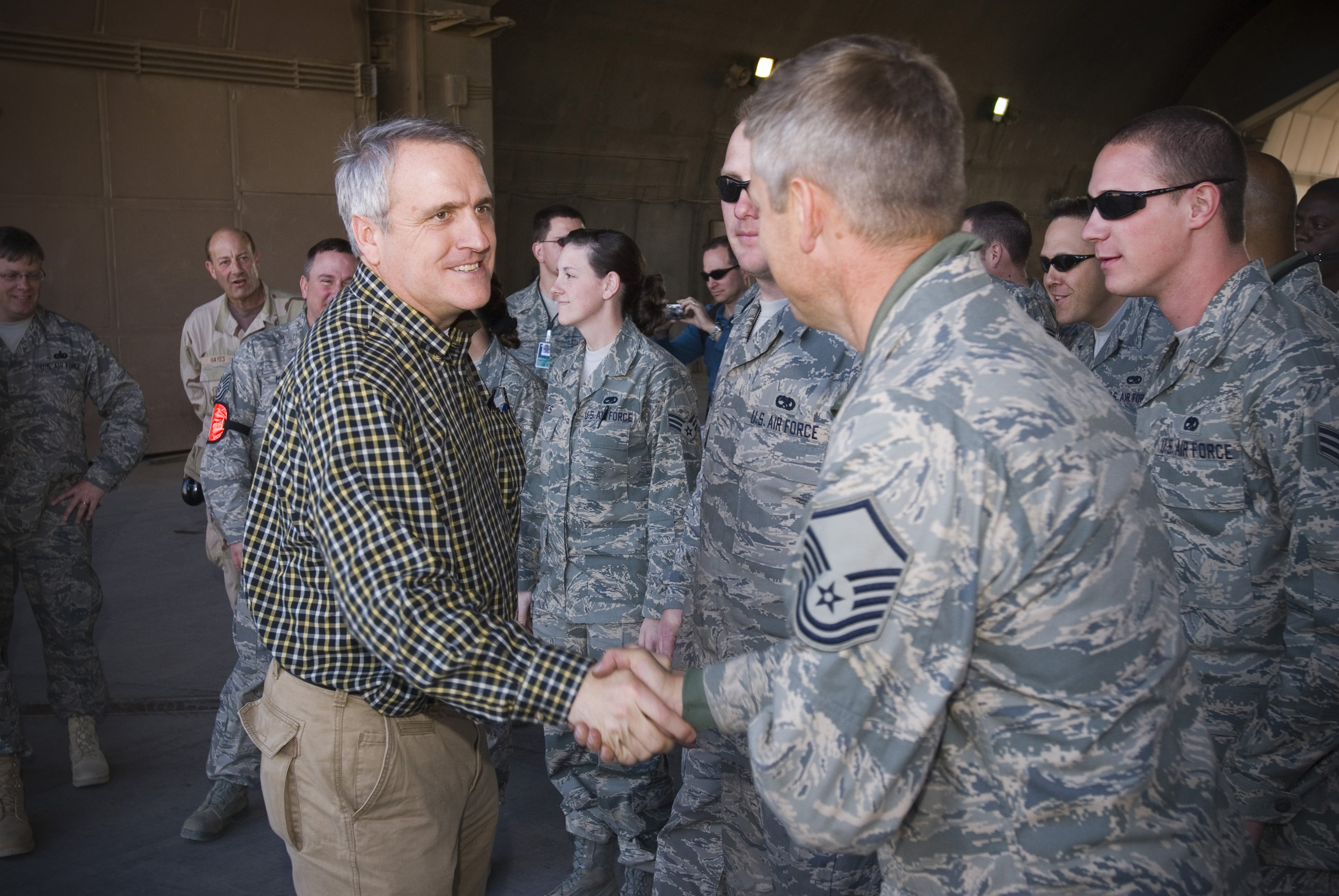
Ritter visiting with members of the U.S. Armed Forces from Colorado in Iraq, December 2007

=== Assassination attempt ===
On July 16, 2007, 33-year-old Aaron Snyder stormed the Capitol while holding a pistol and threatening to assassinate Governor Ritter. Snyder was shot and killed outside Ritter's offices by State Trooper Jay Hemphill.

=== Popularity ===
At the start of his term, Ritter was relatively popular with rural Coloradans, who in the past have tended to vote for Republican candidates (particularly Front Range voters). Ritter's rural roots and construction work background may have appealed to them.

His popularity also extended to the Democratic strongholds in Colorado: the voters of the continental divide ski resorts such as Aspen and Vail, as well as the Denver-Aurora metropolitan area. An August 2007 poll conducted by Rasmussen Reports showed Ritter's approval rating at 60%, while 36% were disapproving and 4% remained undecided.

By July 2008, however, Ritter's approvals had begun a sharp decline, with a Rasmussen poll showing his approvals at 45%. His numbers failed to improve—an April 2009 poll by Public Policy Polling showed the governor's approvals had declined to 41%, with 49% disapproving of his performance. More significantly, the same poll also showed Ritter trailing his most likely 2010 opponent, former U.S. Representative Scott McInnis, by seven points. Though Ritter cited family reasons in his January 2010 announcement that he had decided not to run for re-election, he was dogged by rumors that his poor polling numbers led Democratic power brokers to force him out of the race.

=== Political positions ===
As a member of the Democratic Party, Ritter supports a "semi-progressive" agenda, emphasizing universal health care, environmental protection, housing subsidy and welfare increases, and other stances aligned with the left-wing of the Democratic Party. During his first campaign, more progressive state Democratic leaders encouraged other candidates, including Denver Mayor John Hickenlooper, to pursue the Governorship, because of concerns over Ritter's anti-abortion stance. Others believed that Ritter would be more successful in the purple state than Republican opponents. Hickenlooper did not pursue the office in 2006 and he eventually supported Ritter. Ritter opposes same-sex marriage in another culturally conservative position.

Ritter pledged that, as governor, he would not act to overturn abortion laws and he would veto any bill prohibiting abortion that did not provide for an exception for rape, incest, or fetal anomalies. Ritter further stated that he would restore state funding to Planned Parenthood for family planning and would reverse the veto of a bill that would have allowed pharmacists to dispense the emergency contraception known as the morning-after pill. Ritter also staked out moderate positions on business and labor issues, vetoing legislation in 2007 that would have made it easier for workers to form unions, and, mid-term, naming moderate Republican Don Marostica his director of economic development.

==== Plea bargains ====
Controversy arose during the campaign over Ritter's use of plea bargains while serving as DA. Ritter had plea bargained 97% of cases that were brought to his office (this is close to the national average; prosecutors use plea bargains to settle lower level cases in order to best use their resources). However, controversy surfaced regarding plea bargains Ritter had made as DA that prevented the deportation of both legal and illegal immigrants who had been charged with drug, assault, and other crimes. Both illegal immigration and drug use were hot topics in the race for governor, raising further controversy. Ritter has defended his office's use of plea bargains, stating that "Our priority was to try the most serious cases."

== Post-gubernatorial career ==
Ritter founded the Center for the New Energy Economy at Colorado State University in 2011, with his leadership, belief, and understanding that honest debate and discussion lead to lasting policy. The Center focuses on the economic and societal impacts of clean energy policy across the country, with a strong presence in the intermountain west. Ritter has served as its director since February 2011.

Ritter has served on the boards of several environmentalist non-profits including Board Chair of The Nature Conservancy and Founding Board Chair of Climate Group North America. He is a member of Blackhorn Venture Capital.

Ritter wrote a book called Powering Forward – What Everyone Should Know About America’s Energy Revolution in 2016.

== Family ==
Bill and Jeannie Ritter married in 1983. They have four children: August III, Abe, Sam, and Tally. Jeannie is a substitute teacher in the Denver Public Schools District. The majority of Ritter's extended family lives in Colorado.

== Electoral history ==
2006 Colorado gubernatorial election
Party	Candidate	Votes	%	±%
Democratic	Bill Ritter	887,986	56.99%	+23.33%
Republican	Bob Beauprez	625,886	40.17%	−22.46%
Libertarian	Dawn Winkler-Kinateder	23,323	1.50%	+0.04%
Independent	Paul Noel Fiorino	10,996	0.71%	—
Constitution	Clyde J. Harkins	9,716	0.62%	+0.62%
Write-ins		370	0.02%	—
Majority		262,100	16.82%	−12.15%
Turnout		1,558,277		
Democratic gain from Republican				

== See also ==
- List of governors of Colorado
- State of Colorado
- Conservative Democrat

Party political offices
Preceded by Rollie Heath	Democratic nominee for Governor of Colorado; 2006	Succeeded by John Hickenlooper
Political offices
Preceded by Bill Owens	Governor of Colorado; 2007–2011	Succeeded by John Hickenlooper
U.S. order of precedence (ceremonial)
Preceded by Bill Owens as Former Governor	Order of precedence of the United States; Within Colorado	Succeeded by Jack Markell as Former Governor
Preceded by Bill Owens as Former Governor	Order of precedence of the United States; Outside Colorado	Succeeded by Jack Dalrymple as Former Governor
