= Sudan Peace Act =

United States federal law

- Long title: An Act to facilitate famine relief efforts and a comprehensive solution to the war in Sudan.
- Enacted by: the 107th United States Congress

Citations
- Public law: 107-245

The Sudan Peace Act (Pub. L. 107–245 (text) (PDF)) was a United States federal law sponsored by Thomas Tancredo condemning Sudan for genocide. President George W. Bush signed the Act into law on October 21, 2002.

The Act was passed to facilitate a comprehensive solution to the Second Sudanese Civil War, and condemns violations of human rights on all sides of the conflict; the government's human rights record; the slave trade; government use of militia and other forces to support slaving, including enslavement and slave trading; and aerial bombardment of civilian targets.

It authorized the U.S. Government to spend $100 million in the years 2003, 2004, and 2005 to assist the population in areas of Sudan outside Sudanese government control.

The U.S. president was required to certify within 6 months of enactment, and each 6 months thereafter, that the Sudan Government and the Sudan People's Liberation Movement are negotiating in good faith and that negotiations should continue. If the Sudanese government did not do so or if it interfered with humanitarian efforts, the Act authorized the President of the U.S. to seek a UN Security Council resolution for an arms embargo and to actively seek other financial and diplomatic methods to influence the conduct of the Sudanese Government. Various members of the U.S. Cabinet were required to report on a regular basis about any measures that U.S. federal departments takes to make the Sudanese Government comply with the measures in the Act.

The Act stated that the U.S. president should seek to end Sudanese veto power over and manipulation of United Nations humanitarian relief efforts carried out through Operation Lifeline Sudan, and that the U.S. administration should make contingency plans for relief through other channels.

The Act required that the president should collect information about incidents which may constitute crimes against humanity, genocide, war crimes, and other violations of international humanitarian law by all parties to the conflict. The Secretary of State was required to report every six months on the steps taken to collect information and on the information collected including any findings or determinations made by the State Department.

The Act was repealed in 2021.
