= Donna Lynne =

American politician (born 1953)

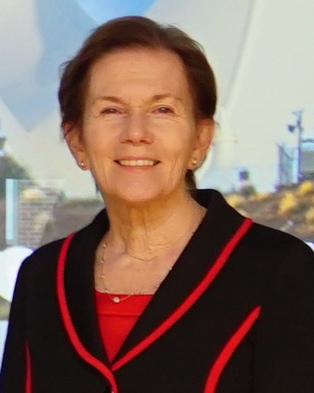

49th Lieutenant Governor of Colorado
- In office May 12, 2016 – January 8, 2019
- Governor: John Hickenlooper
- Preceded by: Joseph Garcia
- Succeeded by: Dianne Primavera

Personal details
- Born: October 27, 1953 (age 73) Jacksonville, Florida, U.S.
- Party: Democratic
- Spouse: Jim Brown
- Children: 3
- Education: University of New Hampshire, Durham (BA); George Washington University (MPA); Columbia University (DPH)

Donna Lynne (born October 27, 1953) is the chief executive officer of Denver Health. She was the senior vice president and chief operating officer of Columbia University Irving Medical Center before joining Denver Health in September 2022. Lynne is a member of the Democratic Party who served as the 49th lieutenant governor of Colorado, from 2016 to 2019. She also served in a dual capacity as the chief operating officer of the State of Colorado. She was appointed to the position by Colorado governor John Hickenlooper on March 23, 2016, and was confirmed by the Colorado House of Representatives and the state Senate on May 4, 2016. Lynne replaced the outgoing lieutenant governor, Joseph Garcia. Prior to her appointment, Lynne was an executive with Kaiser Permanente.

In September 2017, Lynne announced she was running for governor in the 2018 election. She lost the Democratic primary on June 26, 2018 to Jared Polis.

== Early life and education ==
Lynne was born on a Navy base in Jacksonville, Florida. Her father at the time of her birth was in the military for 20 years. Both of her parents were World War II veterans. Lynne is a graduate of the University of New Hampshire, where she received a B. A. in economics and political science. She also attended George Washington University, where she received a Master of Public Administration and obtained a Doctor of Public Health degree from Columbia University.

== Career ==
Lynne spent 20 years working in New York City government. During that time she served as first deputy commissioner for the office of labor relations, director for the mayor's office of operations, and senior vice president for the New York City health and hospital corps.

After leaving New York City government, Lynne went on to work for Group Health Incorporated (GHI) as the executive vice president before being promoted to president of GHI HMO, a subsidiary of GHI. After leaving GHI, Lynne became the president of Kaiser Permanente for the Colorado Region. Within Kaiser, Lynne also served as executive vice president of Kaiser Foundation Health Plan, Inc and as a group president for Kaiser Foundation Health Plan, Inc. and Kaiser Foundation Hospitals. In her role as group president, she oversaw the Colorado, Northwest, and Hawaii regions. During her time at Kaiser, Lynne was selected by the Denver Business Journal as one of the city's "Outstanding Women in Business" in 2008, and as one of the Top 25 Women in Healthcare by Modern Healthcare magazine in 2015. Lynne is also an Adjunct Assistant Professor at Columbia University, teaching a course at Mailman School of Public Health on Quality of Care.

Throughout her career, Lynne has served on a number of boards, including the Colorado Education Initiative, the Colorado Regional Health Information Organization, the Denver Museum of Nature and Science and Teach for America-Colorado. Additionally, Lynne is the former chair of the Denver Metro Chamber of Commerce.

Lynne served in a dual role as both the lieutenant governor of Colorado and the state's chief operating officer. She was appointed to the position by Governor John Hickenlooper.

=== Lieutenant governor ===
As lieutenant governor of Colorado, Lynne was the second-highest-ranking official in the Colorado state government. In her position, Lynne acted as part of the senior team working with the Governor on policy, budget, and legislative matters that impact 5.5 million Coloradans. Lynne co-chaired the Colorado Space Coalition, the Early Childhood Leadership Commission, the Governor's Commission on Community Service, and the Colorado Commission on Indian Affairs. The lieutenant governor's office also provides oversight for the office of eHealth Innovation and the Colorado State Innovation Model. At the beginning of her term, Lynne filled in as the interim director of the Colorado Department of Higher Education until Diane Duffy was appointed to the position in October 2016.

Due to her background, one of Lynne's major focuses throughout her term had been on state and federal health care reform. In a guest commentary article in The Denver Post in May 2017, Lynne expressed her dismay with the recently proposed American Health Care Act (AHCA), stating that the republican-sponsored bill would have a damaging impact on all of Colorado, but specifically its rural communities, by cutting critical funding to the state's Medicaid program. Lynne also wrote about the need to preserve Colorado's outdoor recreation spots in a separate Denver Post article written at the beginning of 2017, highlighting the fact that many of Colorado's beloved outdoor landmarks—like the state's rivers, hiking and biking trails, campgrounds, and fourteeners—are in desperate need of improvements. In the article, Lynne expressed that this issue is of particular importance to her because outdoor recreation is one of the major drivers of the Colorado economy and because she has personally summited all of Colorado's mountains that are over 14,000 feet tall.

=== Chief operating officer ===
As a chief operating officer for the state of Colorado, Lynne launched the Governor's Dashboard, an online tool that allows viewers to see a snapshot of state progress with regards to five major priorities that are vital to fulfilling the vision of a Healthy Colorado. Lynne also managed quarterly performance reviews across cabinet departments, helped to launch customer feedback surveys for high-volume state services, and used information garnered from those surveys to assess the quality of statewide services. In the spring of 2017, Lynne also participated in and oversaw the fourth successful Performance Academy, a program that trains state leaders in how to better serve Coloradans. In April 2017, Lynne concluded a tour of all 64 counties of Colorado where she engaged directly with many community leaders.

== See also ==
- List of female lieutenant governors in the United States

Political offices
Preceded by Joseph Garcia	Lieutenant Governor of Colorado; 2016–2019	Succeeded by Dianne Primavera
