= Paul Noel Fiorino =

American perennial candidate (born 1954)

Paul Fiorino
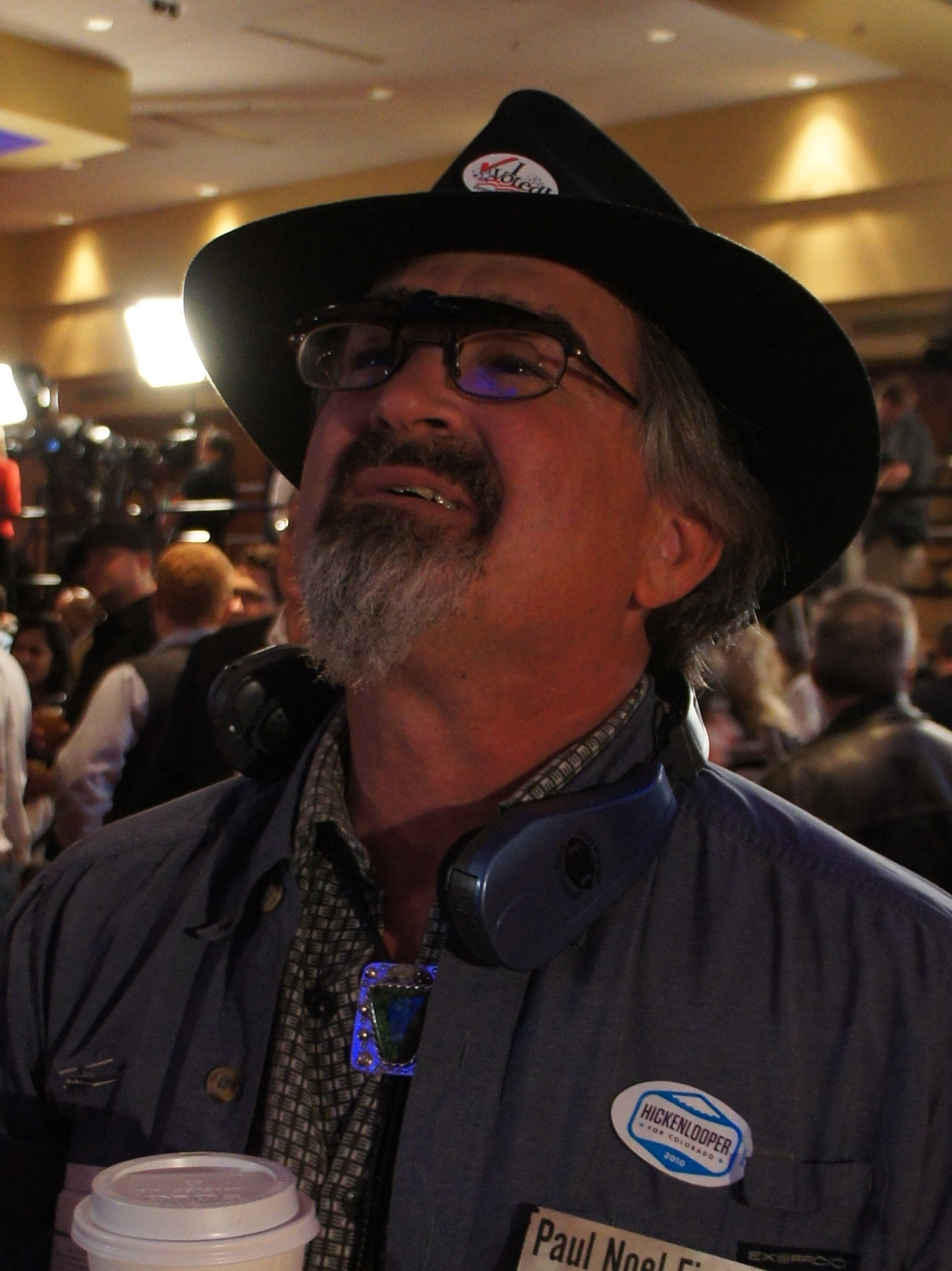
- Fiorino in 2010

President of the Golden Triangle Museum District
- Incumbent
- Assumed office 2008
- In office 1993 - 2000

Member of the Colorado Board for Physical Fitness and Health
- In office 1998–2002
- Appointed by: Bill Owens

Personal details
- Born: Paul Noel Fiorino; November 22, 1954 (age 71) Jamaica, Queens, New York, U.S
- Party: Unity
- Other political affiliations: Democratic; Republican
- Children: 2

Paul Noel Fiorino (born November 22, 1954) is an American ballet instructor and perennial candidate, who was most recently the Unity Party of America's nominee for President of the United States in the 2024 presidential election. He previously ran for Mayor of Denver, Governor of Colorado, and the United States Senate.

== Early life ==
Fiorino was born on November 22, 1954 in Jamaica, Queens, New York City and moved to Denver, Colorado in 1955. Fiorino grew up in Parker. He graduated from Douglas County High School where he was Class President. It was at this time that he discovered dancing as an alternative for sports and took an interest in ballet. He also attended Metropolitan State University. During the 1970s, Fiorino habitually smoked marijuana.

== Career ==
In 1984, he was featured in a PBS documentary titled The Man Who Came to Dance which aired in Colorado and Wyoming. Governor Bill Owens appointed him to the Colorado Board for Physical Fitness and Health in 1998, where he served until 2002. Fiorino served several state party positions, including as the Business Chair of the Colorado Republican Party from 2002 until 2004 and as a 2008 Delegate in the Colorado Democratic Party. Fiorino is also a singer-songwriter who released a gospel album, Guitar and Voice, in 2012 which was inspired by his experience with Guillain-Barre syndrome. According to Fiorino, he was a coach in the 1984 Summer Olympic Games in Los Angeles.

== Political campaigns ==
=== 2006 Colorado gubernatorial campaign ===
Fiorino first ran for office in 2006 where he attempted to become an independent candidate for Governor of Colorado alongside Heather Anne McKibben. He attempted to email media outlets, complaining about the lack of reporting given to minor candidates, he was not invited to a gubernatorial debate. Fiorino later said that he was first called to run for office because of budget cuts to arts in public schools. On election day, Fiorino received less than 1%, however, he was the first independent candidate to ever appear on a Colorado gubernatorial ballot.

=== 2022 Colorado gubernatorial campaign ===
The Unity Party of Colorado nominated Fiorino alongside Cynthia Munhos de Aquino Sirianni for Governor of Colorado in 2022. He was endorsed by the Colorado Music and Business Organization and fellow perennial candidate Gary Swing, who won 5% in the 2016 United States Senate election in Arizona.

=== 2024 presidential campaign ===
Fiorino was nominated by the Unity Party of America over Google Meet on April 6, 2024. The party is broadly centrist and supports a balanced budget amendment to the United States Constitution, the elimination of the federal income tax, and Congressional term limits. However, the Unity Party of Colorado—the only Unity Party affiliate with ballot access—rejected Fiorino as their nominee, choosing to nominate Cornel West by a margin of 95%-5% at their own nominating convention.

=== Other elections ===
Fiorino has been a candidate for Mayor of Denver and Denver City Council, most recently in 2023 as a write-in candidate. He has also run in every Colorado gubernatorial election since 2006. In 2014, Fiorino was invited to a debate that included the Democratic and Republican nominees.
