= Joseph Garcia (American politician) =

American politician (born 1957)

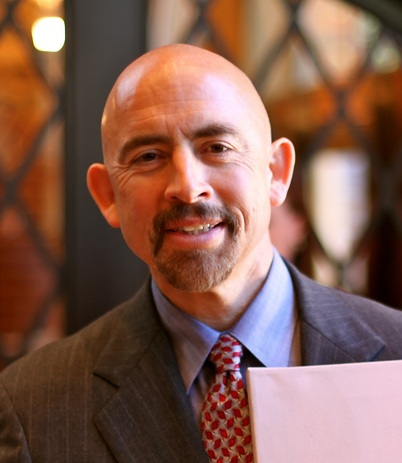
- Garcia in 2011

48th Lieutenant Governor of Colorado
- In office January 11, 2011 – May 12, 2016
- Governor: John Hickenlooper
- Preceded by: Barbara O'Brien
- Succeeded by: Donna Lynne

Executive Director of the Colorado Commission on Higher Education
- In office January 12, 2011 – May 12, 2016
- Governor: John Hickenlooper
- Preceded by: Rico Munn
- Succeeded by: Dan Baer

President of Colorado State University Pueblo
- In office June 30, 2006 – August 6, 2010
- Preceded by: Ron Applbaum
- Succeeded by: Leslie Di Mare

Personal details
- Born: March 21, 1957 (age 69) Lafayette, Indiana, U.S.
- Party: Democratic
- Spouse: Claire Ferguson
- Education: University of Colorado, Boulder (BS); Harvard University (JD)

Joseph A. Garcia (born March 21, 1957) is an American lawyer and politician. He served as the 48th lieutenant governor of Colorado from January 2011 to May 2016 and is the first Latin American to hold the office. He is currently the chancellor of the Colorado Community College System.

== Early life, education and career ==
Joseph A. Garcia was born on March 21, 1957, in Lafayette, Indiana. He attended Austin E. Lathrop High School in Fairbanks, Alaska from 1973 to 1974 and graduated from T.C. Williams High School in Alexandria, Virginia in 1975. He graduated from the University of Colorado Boulder in 1979 where he received a Bachelor of Science in business. Garcia then graduated from Harvard Law School in 1983.

After law school, Garcia took a job with the firm of Holme Roberts & Owen, going on to become their first Hispanic partner. Garcia worked with the firm from 1983 to 1993. Garcia was appointed by Governor Romer as the executive director of the Department of Regulatory Agencies in 1993. In 1999, Garcia was appointed by the White House as the Regional Director of the Rocky Mountain States for the United States Department of Housing and Urban Development.

== President at Pikes Peak Community College and CSU Pueblo ==
Garcia was appointed by Gov. Ritter to serve as one of three commissioners from Colorado on the Western Interstate Commission on Higher Education and he was reappointed by Gov. Hickenlooper. He served as chair of the commission in 2012. He also served as a member of the board of trustees for the Higher Learning Commission of the North Central Association of Colleges and Schools and was previously on the Governmental Affairs Committee for the Hispanic Association of Colleges and Universities.

From 2001 to 2006, he served as president of Pikes Peak Community College. As president, Garcia was responsible for leading and managing the second largest community college in the state and its 750 employees in servicing the community's diverse education, business, and industry needs. He developed and maintained relationships with Colorado Legislature, other elected officials, and industry leaders in order to affect legislation, policy changes and funding that impacted the college and the Community Colleges of Colorado system. He also represented the college through active participation in business and civic organizations, and devised sustainable education programs and partnerships relevant to students and community needs. While at PPCC, Garcia was twice named Community College President of the Year by the Community College student government association.

From 2006 to 2010, he served as president of Colorado State University Pueblo. During his tenure at the university, enrollment at the university grew faster than at any time in its history, and more than $125 million in new capital construction was begun and completed. A new football and track stadium, multiple residence halls, and a recreational facility were built and existing classroom and academic support facilities underwent major renovations and expansion. CSU Pueblo was also recognized as The Outstanding Member Institution by the Hispanic Association of Colleges and Universities during Garcia's tenure.

Garcia took a leave of absence from Colorado State University Pueblo to campaign with Hickenlooper and resigned from his position following his election as lieutenant governor in November 2010.

== Lieutenant Governor of Colorado ==
=== 2010 election ===
Denver mayor and Democratic nominee for governor John Hickenlooper selected Garcia as his running mate for the 2010 election. They won the election in a landslide against former Congressman Tom Tancredo and Republican Dan Maes. They were re-elected in 2014, defeating Colorado businessman and former congressman Bob Beauprez, a Republican.

=== Tenure ===
Garcia was sworn in as the 48th lieutenant governor of Colorado on January 11, 2011, succeeding fellow Democrat Barbara O'Brien. After being elected lieutenant governor, the state legislature confirmed Joseph A. Garcia as executive director of higher education, due to his extensive experience in higher education. It is the first time a Colorado lieutenant governor has held a dual role by heading a state agency. The lieutenant governor also advises the governor on education policy and legislation, chairs the Education Leadership Council, the Colorado Space Coalition and the Colorado Commission of Indian Affairs.

In 2013, Garcia was seen as a leading candidate to replace Hilda Solis as United States Secretary of Labor in the Obama administration; however, the post went to Tom Perez instead.

=== Resignation ===
On November 10, 2015, Garcia announced he would resign as Lieutenant Governor of Colorado and executive director of the Colorado Department of Higher Education to join the Western Interstate Commission for Higher Education as president. Prior to this, Garcia was considered likely to run for Governor of Colorado in the 2018 election.

Governor Hickenlooper nominated health care executive Donna Lynne to succeed Garcia as lieutenant governor and she was confirmed by the Colorado Senate.

== Chancellor of the Colorado Community College System ==
Joe Garcia is the Chancellor of the Colorado Community College System (CCCS). As CCCS Chancellor, Garcia leads the state's largest system of higher education, which serves 137,000 students annually at 13 colleges and 40 locations across Colorado.

Garcia brings demonstrated leadership and commitment to advancing higher education initiatives and access through various roles in both the public sector and in higher education.

Garcia currently serves on the Boards for the National Student Clearinghouse (NSC) and for the Mexican American Legal Defense & Educational Fund (MALDEF). He is also the chair of the Education & Training Committee (E & T) for the Colorado Workforce Development Council (CWDC).

== See also ==
- List of minority governors and lieutenant governors in the United States

Political offices
Preceded by Barbara O'Brien	Lieutenant Governor of Colorado; 2011–2016	Succeeded by Donna Lynne
