= Tom Tancredo =

American politician (born 1945)

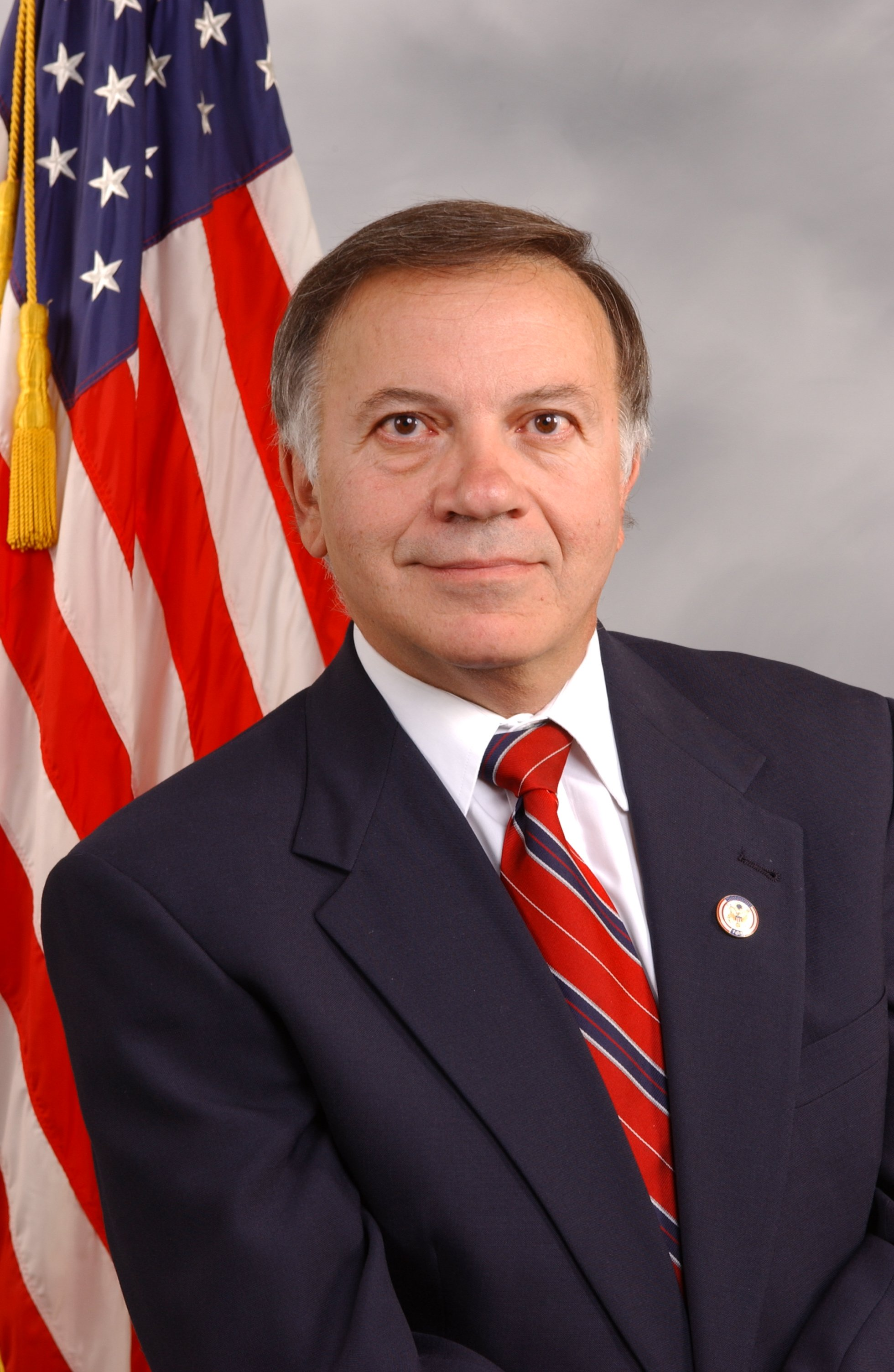

Member of the U.S. House of Representatives from Colorado's 6th district
- In office January 3, 1999 – January 3, 2009
- Preceded by: Daniel Schaefer
- Succeeded by: Mike Coffman

Member of the Colorado House of Representatives from the 27th district
- In office January 3, 1977 – October 16, 1981
- Preceded by: Nancy Flett
- Succeeded by: Judy Ford

Personal details
- Born: Thomas Gerard Tancredo; December 20, 1945 (age 80) Denver, Colorado, U.S.
- Party: Republican (before 2010, 2011–2015, 2017–present); Constitution (2010–2011); Independent (2015–2017)
- Spouse: Jackie Tancredo (m. 1977)
- Children: 2
- Education: University of Northern Colorado (BA)

Thomas Gerard Tancredo (/tæŋˈkreɪdoʊ/; born December 20, 1945) is an American politician from Colorado who represented the state's sixth congressional district in the United States House of Representatives from 1999 to 2009 as a Republican. He ran for President of the United States during the 2008 election, and was the Constitution Party's unsuccessful nominee for Governor of Colorado in 2010, where he received 36% of the vote.

Tancredo was elected to the Colorado House of Representatives in 1976 and served two terms. After working in the United States Department of Education during the Ronald Reagan and George H. W. Bush administrations, he was elected to the United States Congress, and served five terms. He decided to not seek re-election in 2008, instead running a presidential campaign, centered on the issues of illegal immigration and terrorism. He dropped out of the race in December 2007 to assist former Massachusetts Governor Mitt Romney in his campaign for the nomination.

Tancredo announced on July 26, 2010, that he planned to change parties and run for Governor of Colorado on the American Constitution Party ticket. He received 617,030 votes (36.7%), coming in second place, well ahead of the Republican Party nominee Dan Maes, who got about 11% of the vote.

Tancredo ran for governor in 2014, this time as a Republican, because of his opposition to Colorado governor John Hickenlooper's refusal to execute convicted murderer Nathan Dunlap, and because of Hickenlooper's attempts to pass gun control legislation. Tancredo competed for the Republican Party's nomination with Bob Beauprez, Steve House, Greg Brophy, Mike Kopp, and Scott Gessler. Tancredo lost the primary to Beauprez. He once again left the Republican Party in 2015, becoming an independent. Tancredo again ran as a Republican for governor in 2018, but withdrew from the race.

== Early life, education and career ==
Tancredo was born in Denver, Colorado, the son of Adeline (née Lombardi) and Gerald Tancredo. All four of his grandparents emigrated from Italy. He grew up in the then-predominantly Italian neighborhood of North Denver, and attended St. Catherine's Elementary School and Holy Family High School. He graduated from the University of Northern Colorado with a degree in political science. Tancredo was active with the College Republicans and a conservative organization, Young Americans for Freedom (YAF).

As a Republican student activist Tancredo spoke in support of the Vietnam War. After graduating from the University of Northern Colorado he became eligible to serve in Vietnam in June 1969. Tancredo has said he went for his physical, telling doctors he had been treated for depression, and eventually got a "1-Y" deferment.

In 1976, while teaching history at Drake Junior High School in Arvada, he ran for and won a seat in the Colorado House of Representatives. He served two terms (1977–1981) and was one of the leaders of a vocal group of conservative legislators opposing the policies of Colorado Governor Dick Lamm. During the 1970s, Tancredo pioneered opposition to bilingual education, an issue that would remain a feature of his political orientation.

Tancredo was appointed by President Ronald Reagan to be the regional representative in Denver for the Department of Education in 1981. He stayed on through President George H. W. Bush's administration in 1992, and pared the office's staff from 225 to 60 employees. He became president of the Independence Institute in 1993, a conservative think tank based in Golden, Colorado, serving there until his election to Congress. He was a leader in the Colorado term limits movement.

== U.S. House of Representatives ==
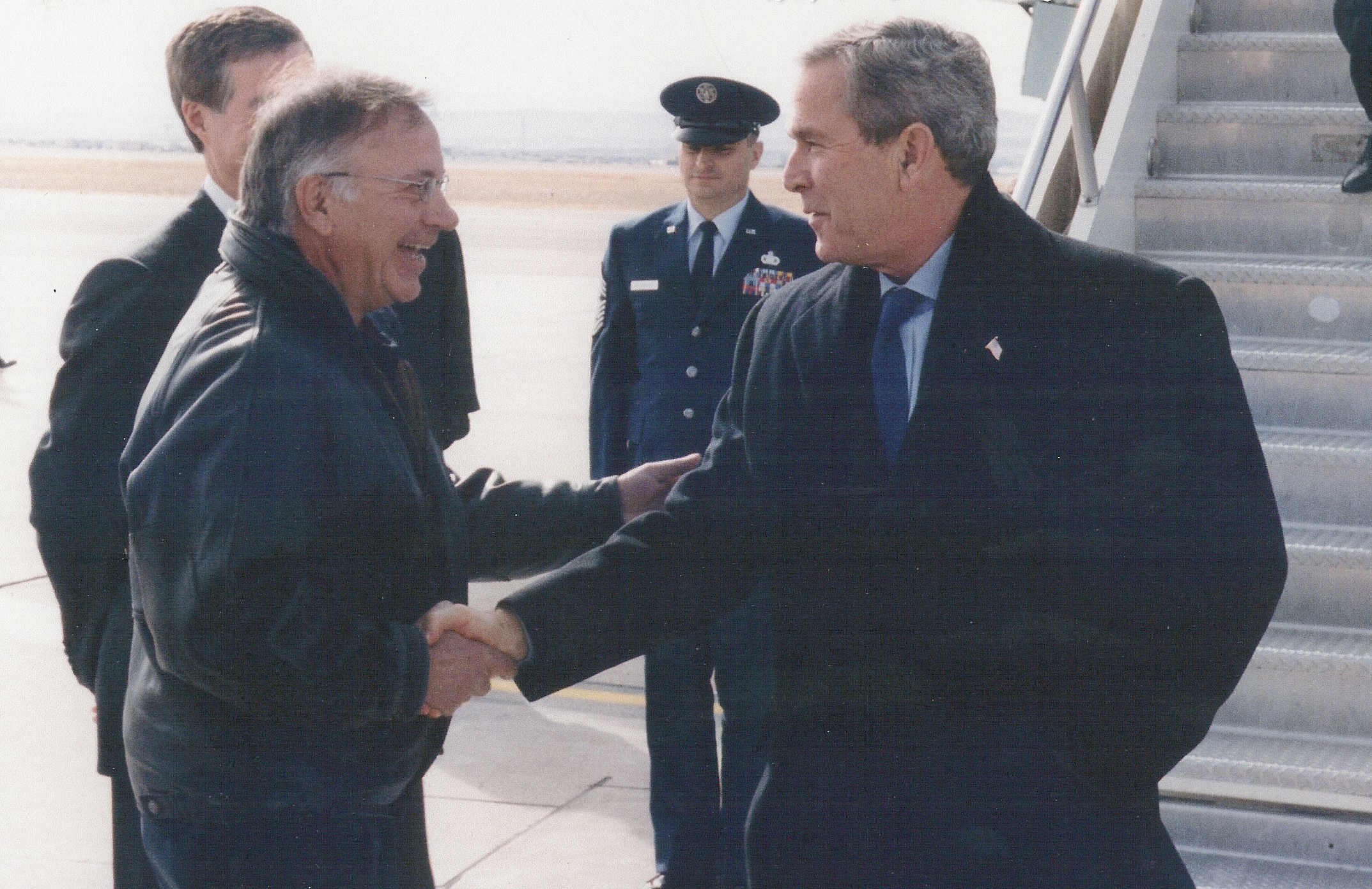
Tancredo greeting President George W. Bush in 2004

After Dan Schaefer decided not to run for a seventh full term in the 6th Congressional District in 1998, Tancredo narrowly won the five-way Republican primary, and the election in November. He was only the second person to represent the 6th District since its creation in 1983 (former astronaut Jack Swigert was elected as the district's first congressman in 1982, but died before taking office). Despite his promise to serve only three terms in Congress, he decided to run for a fourth term and won re-election.

=== Conflict with party leadership ===
Tancredo's outspoken advocacy for immigration reform, and particularly his criticism of President George W. Bush's border security controls, reportedly made him persona non grata in the Bush White House. According to Tancredo, he and Bush's political adviser, Karl Rove, got into a "screaming match" after Tancredo claimed that "if the nation suffered another attack at the hands of terrorists able to skirt immigration laws, the blood of the people killed" would be on Bush's and Congress' hands. Rove responded by calling Tancredo "a traitor to the party" and "a traitor to the president," and warned him to never "darken the doorstep of the White House."

In an interview, Tancredo said his falling out with the White House has lasted. "One reason I am persona non grata at the White House is not just because of immigration... but because I refuse to support him on his trade policy, his education policy, Medicare and prescription drugs initiatives.... Here was a Republican Congress increasing government to an extent larger than it had been increased since Medicare had come into existence." Tancredo reported that his career in Congress was threatened by the leadership because of his stances. "I was called into Tom DeLay's office because I was supporting Republican challengers to Republican incumbents. I had a group called Team America that went out and did that. He called me and said to me, 'You're jeopardizing your career in this place by doing these things.' And I said, 'Tom, out of all the things you can threaten me with that is the least effective because I do not look at this place as a career.'"

=== Committee assignments ===
- Foreign Affairs Committee
  - Subcommittee on Africa and Global Health
  - Subcommittee on Terrorism, Nonproliferation and Trade
- Natural Resources Committee
  - Subcommittee on National Parks, Forests and Public Lands

=== Significant legislation ===
Tancredo sponsored the Sudan Peace Act. The Sudan Peace Act says "A viable, comprehensive, and internationally sponsored peace process, protected from manipulation, presents the best chance for a permanent resolution of the war, protection of human rights, and a self-sustaining Sudan." The Act passed the House of Representatives with a 359–8 vote, was passed unanimously in the Senate without amendment seven days later, and was signed into law on November 21, 2002.

Tancredo introduced the Mass Immigration Reduction Act. The act would have imposed an indefinite moratorium on immigration to the United States. Under the act, only spouses and children of American citizens would be allowed to immigrate, which Tancredo estimated would amount to 300,000 immigrants annually. The moratorium would last for at least the first five years of the act and, after that, until such time as there were fewer than 10,000 illegal immigrants entering per year. When those conditions were met, immigration would only have been allowed at whatever level the president and both houses of Congress agreed would have no adverse impact on wages, housing, the environment, or schools. When last introduced in 2003, the bill had 11 cosponsors. Organizations that have endorsed Tancredo's bill include: NumbersUSA, Population-Environment Balance, Carrying Capacity Network, Federation for American Immigration Reform, Negative Population Growth, and the American Patrol. Tancredo introduced the bill in 2001 (H. R. 2712) and 2003 (H. R. 946). Tancredo did not re-introduce the bill in 2005. In 2007, he proposed an amendment to the U.S. Constitution to "establish English as the official language of the United States", (H.R. 19).

In 2005, Tancredo introduced a resolution calling on the president to recognize the government of the Republic of China (Taiwan) and to abandon the One-China policy. He has been critical of the People's Republic of China. This has since been modified and reintroduced as H. Con. Res. 73.

== 2008 presidential campaign ==
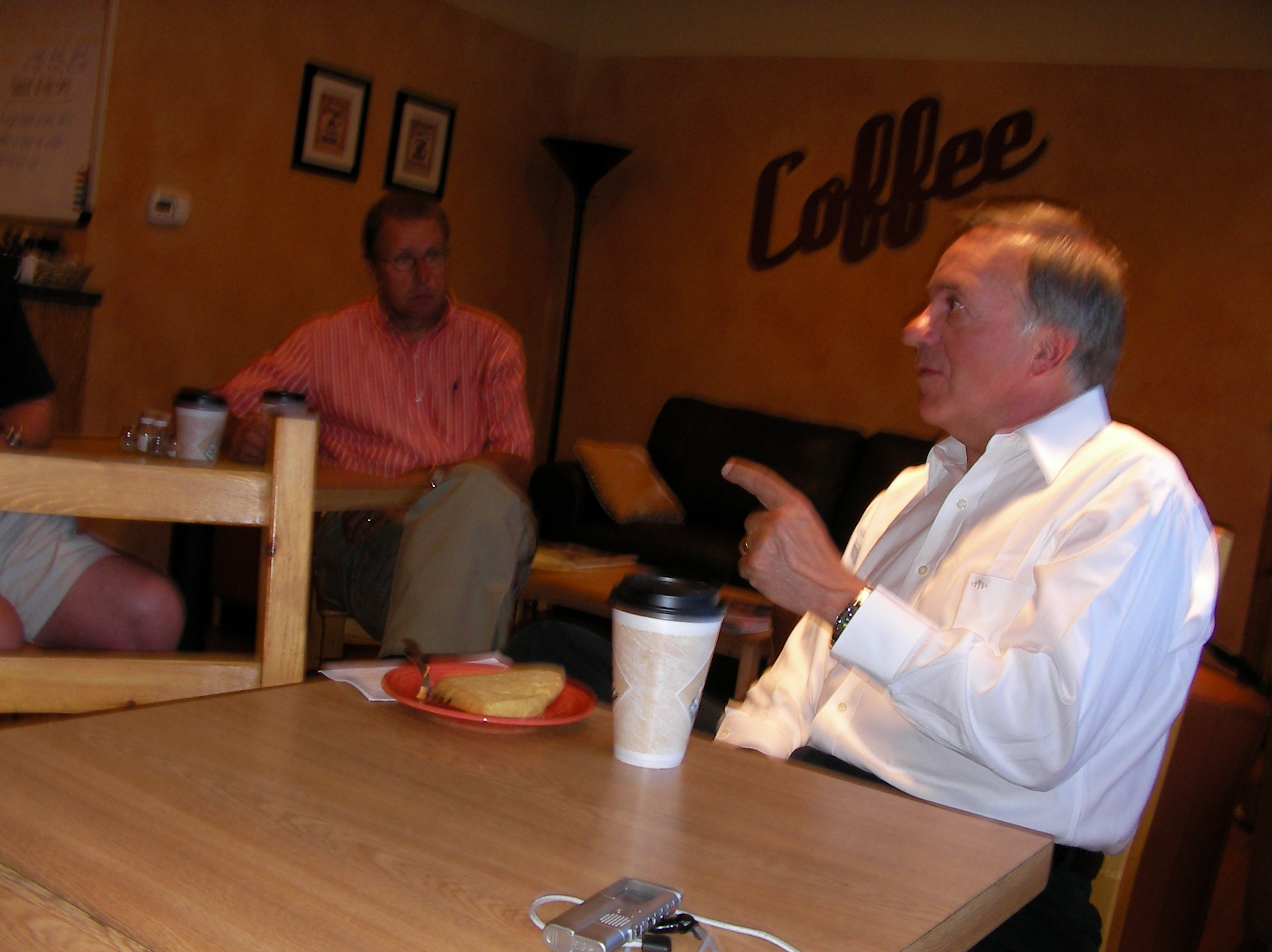
Tancredo campaigning in Adel, Iowa in 2007

In February 2005, Tancredo announced he would seek the Republican nomination for president if all other candidates failed to address the illegal immigration problem.

On February 9, 2006, Tancredo addressed the Conservative Political Action Conference (CPAC), the annual conference of the American Conservative Union. He scored 5% of the vote in the 2008 CPAC straw poll.

On January 16, 2007, Tancredo announced that he formed an exploratory committee on seeking the presidential nomination of the Republican Party. He said that the Republican Party needs someone who can offer America a "common sense agenda".

A spokesman for Tancredo's exploratory committee has confirmed that he would not run on a third party platform, and that "they've had no intention to run as a third-party candidate, ever, and we'll never consider that because he's a Republican, period."

On February 13, the American Conservative Union issued ratings for potential presidential candidates. Tancredo took first with a lifetime ranking of 99 out of 100. The website ConservativesBetrayed.com polled 525 people who attended CPAC 2007, and 88.1% believed that Tancredo would govern as a conservative. Newt Gingrich polled next at 87.9%.

At the 2007 CPAC conference, held March 1–3, Tancredo was ranked sixth in the CPAC straw poll, with 9%, when first and second choices were combined.

On April 2, 2007, Tancredo announced that he would run for president in the 2008 election. This announcement was made on 1040 WHO Talk Radio in Iowa. He denounced other Republican candidates for their lack of consistency on the illegal immigration issue, the issue on which Tancredo will run. In early April, he also participated in what was billed as the first online presidential debate, against fellow Republican and presidential candidate Duncan Hunter.

In his speech in 2007 to CPAC, Tancredo said:

If you want to call me a single-issue candidate, that's fine, just so long as you know that my single issue is the survival and the success of the conservative movement in America.

In a May 3, 2007, debate among the ten candidates for the 2008 Republican Presidential nomination, Tancredo was one of three who raised their hands when asked if anyone did not believe in the theory of evolution.

On August 10, 2007, Rep. Tom Tancredo's presidential campaign reportedly was the victim of an e-mail hoax on the eve of the Republican Party straw poll in Ames, Iowa. The Des Moines Register reports that a hoax e-mail sent on Friday to almost 500 Tancredo supporters told them—falsely—that chartered buses to ferry them to the daylong events had either been cancelled or delayed.

On September 5, 2007, during a visit to Concord, New Hampshire, Tancredo made it clear that he supports strictly enforcing immigration laws and deporting all illegal immigrants. He believes so-called sanctuary policies provide safe havens for criminals. Tancredo also mentioned his support of the building of a fence between Mexico and the United States, and that mayors and city council members who adopt sanctuary city policies should face criminal charges. He urged New Hampshire Governor John Lynch to veto an upcoming immigration bill and demanded the ouster of the bill's sponsors.

On November 13, 2007, the Tancredo campaign released an ad called "Tough on Terror" in which a hypothetical terrorist attack occurs in a shopping mall. The ad blames inept border security for the attack and flashes images of an injured child and a wrecked train. A voiceover comments, "There are consequences to open borders beyond the 20 million aliens who have come to take our jobs... the price we pay for spineless politicians who refuse to defend our borders against those who come to kill."

On his 62nd birthday December 20, 2007, Tancredo ended his candidacy for the 2008 Republican Presidential nomination, and endorsed Mitt Romney.

Individual contributions made up most of the campaign cash that Tancredo had received, being about 97% of his total pocketbook. He granted himself $200 for his campaign and received no federal funding. $88,457 of his money came from interest from the campaign's bank accounts and loans from outside sources. The majority of Tancredo's funds were not disclosed.

== Gubernatorial campaigns ==
=== 2010 ===
Results by county of the 2010 gubernatorial election. Counties in purple went for Tancredo, counties in blue went for John Hickenlooper, and counties in red went for Dan Maes. Darker shades indicate higher percentages of the vote.

After he ended his run for president, Tancredo decided against running for reelection. Former Republican gubernatorial candidate Bob Beauprez said he spoke to Tancredo about possible runs for governor or Senate in 2010.

Tancredo spoke at the Constitution Party's national committee meeting on October 23, 2009.

In July 2010, Tancredo warned the two Republican candidates for governor, Scott McInnis and Dan Maes, that he would launch a third-party bid as candidate of the Constitution Party's Colorado branch if the Republican primary winner was behind in general election polling and did not drop out. Tancredo felt that McInnis was unelectable because his plagiarism scandal had exposed him as "basically a fraud," while Maes' campaign finance violations likewise made him unelectable. Tancredo subsequently announced that he was going ahead with plans to run as a Constitution Party candidate.

Tancredo selected Pat Miller as his running mate.

Tancredo placed second in the election with 36.5 percent of the vote, well ahead of Maes, the Republican Party candidate.

In January 2011 Tancredo re-registered as a Republican, saying it is the "only game in town".

=== 2014 ===
Tancredo announced he would run for governor again in 2014. He was angry at Colorado governor John Hickenlooper because Hickenlooper had passed gun restrictions, and because Hickenlooper had granted a stay of execution for Nathan Dunlap, the man responsible for the 1993 Aurora, Colorado shooting that killed 4. He lost the Republican primary to Bob Beauprez, who went on to lose the general election to Hickenlooper.

=== 2018 ===
Logo of Tancredo's 2018 campaign

On October 31, 2017, Tancredo announced he would run for Governor of Colorado a third time. His bid was fueled in part by Republican politicians' reluctance to criticize the cancellation of an April 2018 VDARE event where Tancredo was scheduled to speak. A central theme of his campaign is strong opposition to illegal immigration, and he vowed to defund the city of Denver due to its status as a sanctuary city.

On January 30, 2018, Tancredo announced he was withdrawing from the race.

== Political action committees ==
=== Team America PAC ===
Tancredo founded the Team America political action committee in 2004 in order to raise contributions for congressional candidates who opposed illegal immigration. Campaign laws forced Tancredo to resign from Team America PAC. The PAC was noted for targeting incumbent Congressman Chris Cannon in the 2006 Republican primary. In 2009, reporters discovered that Marcus Epstein, the executive director of Team America, had assaulted an African American woman in 2007, and had used a racial epithet. Tancredo kept Epstein on his staff despite the guilty plea.

=== American Legacy Alliance ===
In June 2011 Tancredo founded a Super PAC called the American Legacy Alliance to support candidates for federal office who oppose illegal immigration.

== Political positions ==
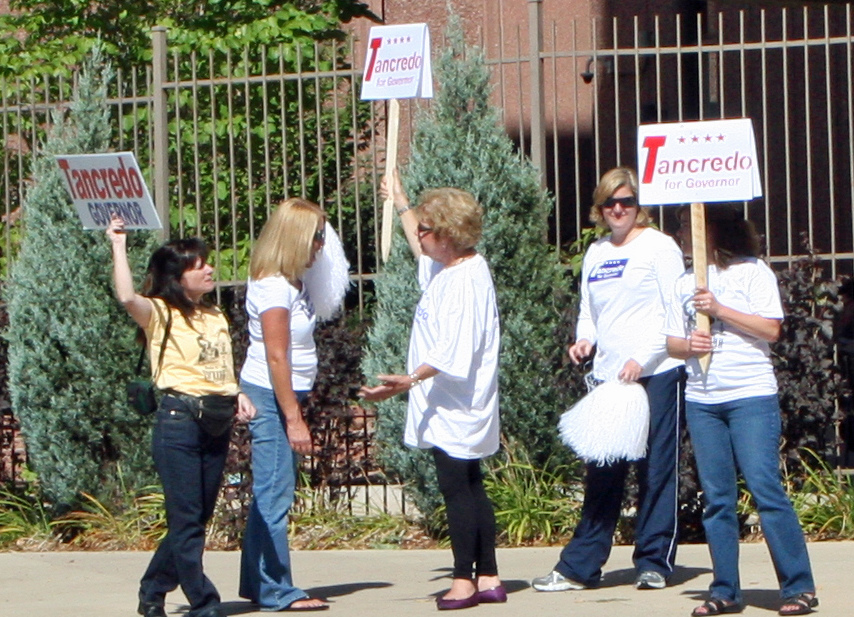
Supporters of Tancredo's gubernatorial bid holding a demonstration in October 2010

Tancredo traces his interest in politics to the eighth grade, when he played Fidel Castro in a class assignment. Tancredo urges America to reject "the siren song of multiculturalism" and depicts Islam as "a civilization bent on destroying ours". In July 2005, Tancredo proposed that America respond to any future terrorist attack by bombing Mecca and other holy sites. In September 2006, when Pope Benedict XVI gave a speech quoting a 14th-century Byzantine emperor who said the prophet Mohammed had brought "things only evil and inhuman", sparking Muslim anger throughout the world, Tancredo urged him not to apologize.

=== Abortion ===
Tancredo has said that abortion "compromises the sanctity of life" and "attacks the most vulnerable among us: unborn boys and girls". He does not support the granting of federal funds to "any organization that promotes abortion". He voted in favor of the Partial-Birth Abortion Ban Act, and in favor of legislation requiring parental notification when a minor seeks an abortion. He received an "A" on the National Right to Life Committee report card, indicating that he votes in Congress on the anti-abortion side of this issue.

In the first Republican debate held on May 3, 2007, Tancredo agreed that the U.S. Supreme Court should overturn the 1973 Roe v. Wade decision, adding that it would be "the greatest day in this country's history".

Tancredo was criticized by anti-abortion forces for accepting over $20,000 in donations from John Tanton, founder of the Federation for American Immigration Reform and a founder of a Planned Parenthood chapter.

=== Immigration ===
Tom Tancredo is perhaps best known for his opposition to immigration. Tancredo founded the Congressional Immigration Reform Caucus in May 1999. He served as its chairman until January 2007, when he turned the chairmanship over to Brian Bilbray.

Tancredo has called for halting illegal immigration, and a three-year moratorium on all legal immigration to allow those immigrants already in the country to be assimilated. Tancredo called for the deportation of the family of Jesus Apodaca, an undocumented immigrant child in a Denver high school.

Tancredo criticized the Denver Public Library system for purchasing reading materials written in Spanish and for offering space for classes to be held for these library users, on the grounds that putting Spanish-speakers in a 'linguistic ghetto' would delay their integration into American society.

Tancredo sponsored legislation to eliminate H-1B visas for temporary workers in 2005.

Tancredo was the sponsor of a successful, bi-partisan amendment to a Department of Homeland Security appropriations bill that would withhold federal emergency services funds from 'sanctuary cities'.

On July 30, 2007, Tancredo "criticized Congressional Democrats for eliminating a requirement that anyone applying for Medicaid and State Children's Health Insurance Program (SCHIP) services provide proof of U.S. citizenship". According to Tancredo, "[t]he new Democrat plan would raise taxes and make it easier for illegal aliens to obtain taxpayer-funded medical benefits."

Tancredo has made it a point in all of his public speeches to differentiate between those who enter the United States legally and those who come illegally. He frequently attends naturalization ceremonies to support new citizens for "doing it the right way".

In 2006, Tancredo published In Mortal Danger: The Battle for America's Border and Security through Joseph Farah's WND Books in Nashville, Tennessee. The volume focuses on American cultural identity and his proposals to remedy what he contends to be major flaws in the immigration system.

On April 17, 2008, Tancredo alleged that Pope Benedict XVI was encouraging illegal immigration to the US to boost membership in the Catholic Church. In response to a statement by the Pope at a Mass in Washington, Tancredo stated, "I suspect the Pope's immigration comments may have less to do with spreading the gospel than they do about recruiting new members of the church." While Tancredo was raised a Catholic, he now attends Cherry Hills Community Church, a congregation in the Evangelical Presbyterian Church.

Tancredo's has staunchly supported tightening immigration requirements from Islamic countries. On September 18, 2008, Tancredo introduced H.R. 6975, the Jihad Prevention Act, which would require aliens to attest that they will not advocate installing a Sharia law system in the United States as a condition for admission, and for other purposes. Aliens failing to make such an attestation would be ineligible for admission. Further, the visa of any alien advocating the installation of a Sharia law system in the United States would be subject to revocation.

In May 2011, Tancredo represented the affirmative with Kris Kobach in a radio-broadcast debate of the motion "Don't give us your tired, your poor, your huddled masses." The two debated Mayor Julian Castro of San Antonio and Tamar Jacoby of ImmigrationWorks USA. Tancredo and Kobach were declared the victors based on before and after polling of the live in-attendance audience mostly by convincing much of the self-identified undecided audience members of the strength of the motion.

Pre-Debate Poll Results: 16% For | 54% Against | 30% undecided
Post Debate Poll Results: 35% For | 52% Against | 13% undecided

Tancredo's anti-illegal immigration stance became a campaign issue during the 2011 Denver mayoral campaign, which Tancredo did not enter. The Chris Romer campaign tried to erode rival Michael Hancock's support among Hispanics by emails and robocalls claiming that Tancredo had endorsed Hancock. Tancredo, who had neither met nor endorsed Hancock, responded by appearing on a radio talk show and endorsing Romer.

=== Federalism ===
He was one of 33 congressmen to vote against the renewal of the Voting Rights Act because he asserted that its requirement of multilingual ballots would result in a costly unfunded mandate. He was one of a handful of Republicans who voted for an amendment proposed by Maurice Hinchey and Dana Rohrabacher to stop the Department of Justice from raiding medical marijuana patients and caregivers in states where medical marijuana is legal, citing states' rights concerns.

On the other hand, Tancredo supports Federal action in what he considers its proper sphere. He has suggested state legislators and 'sanctuary city' mayors should be imprisoned for passing laws contrary to federal immigration law. He also supports the Federal Marriage Amendment to ban gay marriage nationally, and defended this position by stating a constitutional amendment is the "last resort" to neutralize judicial activism that would legalize gay marriage in courts, against the wishes of voters. The amendment would also use Constitutional means to prevent voters and legislators from legalizing gay marriage in their states.

=== Fiscal policy ===
The National Taxpayers Union awarded Tancredo a grade of A for each year he has served in Congress. Tancredo was awarded a grade of A for votes he cast in 1999 to 2007 inclusively. Additionally, Tancredo received the National Taxpayers Union's "Taxpayers' Friend Award" in 1999 to 2006 inclusively as well The award is given by the NTU to those members of Congress that are among "the strongest supporters of responsible tax and spending policies". He is also a strong supporter of the FairTax and advocates the repeal of the 16th Amendment. He is also against raising minimum wage.

=== Foreign policy ===
Tancredo's position on Iraq is, "America's noble sacrifice has purchased Iraqis a precious opportunity for democratic change; it is now up to them to ensure success. Setting the President's 'November benchmark for shifting control' as an actual timetable for disengagement will let regional powers and Iraqi factions cooperate to forge a new balance of power." Fellow Republican state treasurer Mike Coffman refused to share the stage with Tancredo at a pro-war rally for the Iraq war in 2003 because of Tancredo's failure to serve in the Vietnam War. In 1970 Tancredo appealed his 1-A draft status, which would have put him at the top of the list for draft eligibility during the Vietnam War. Tancredo said he was diagnosed with depression when he was 16 or 17 and received medication for five years for panic attacks and bouts of anxiety and depression.

During a 2005 radio interview on Orlando talk-radio station WFLA AM 540, Tancredo responded to a questioner asking about the hypothetical U.S. response to a nuclear attack on U.S. cities by al-Qaeda, by saying that one possible response would be to retaliate by "taking out" Muslim holy sites (specifically, Mecca) if it were clearly proven that Islamic terrorists were behind such an attack. Several days later, in an interview on CNN together with James Zogby, Tancredo said that the attack was mentioned merely as a hypothetical response and insisted that there was nothing for which he should apologize.

During the Republican Presidential Debate broadcast on Fox on May 15, 2007, Tancredo made a statement in passing that the root cause of Islamic terrorism is "a dictate of their religion". In September 2007 Tancredo defended his remarks: "I still believe it is something we must consider as a possible deterrent because at the present time there are no negative consequences that would accrue to the people who commit a crime such as a nuclear, chemical or biological attack."

During a July 31, 2007 townhall meeting in Iowa, Tancredo said that a threat to bomb Mecca and Medina was "the only thing I can think of" that could deter a nuclear terrorist attack. This statement drew substantial criticism from the Council on American-Islamic Relations, as well as State Department spokesman Tom Casey, who stated that "To somehow suggest that an appropriate response to terrorism would be to attack sites that are holy and sacred to more than a billion people throughout the world is just absolutely crazy."

Tancredo has stated that he would like to see the United States give more support to the Iranian exile organization People's Mujahedin of Iran (PMOI). The PMOI was designated as a terrorist organization by the United States State Department from 1997 to 2012. Tancredo states that this was done "for political reasons" by the Clinton administration. Secretary of State Hillary Clinton removed the designation of "terrorist organization" when no proof of terrorist activity or intent could be produced.

=== Sonia Sotomayor nomination ===
Tancredo became one of the outspoken conservative opponents to the nomination of Sonia Sotomayor to the Supreme Court. On May 28, 2009, he made an appearance on CNN to voice his opposition and claimed that Sotomayor was a racist. When CNN's Rick Sanchez asked him if Sotomayor was a racist, Tancredo replied "certainly her words would indicate that that is the truth." He then compared the Hispanic-American advocacy group La Raza to the Ku Klux Klan by saying "it's a Latino KKK without the hoods or the nooses."

=== Voting rights ===
On February 4, 2010, Tancredo spoke at the National Convention for the Tea Party movement where he told attendees that Barack Obama won because of "people who could not even spell the word 'vote' or say it in English". He then proposed "a civics literacy test" as a prerequisite to voting. These remarks were criticized by the Democratic Colorado House Speaker Terrance Carroll and the Southern Poverty Law Center's research director Heidi Beirich. Tancredo has denied the charge that his remarks were aimed at a specific group.

On April 14, 2009, a speech by Tancredo at the University of North Carolina at Chapel Hill was disrupted by students protesting his views on immigration in which he called for a civics literacy test before voting.

=== Marijuana legalization ===
Tancredo has declared himself in favor of the legalization of marijuana. He said that his reasons to legalize marijuana include "The issue of violence that surrounds it—not just on the border—and the crimes all over the place. The number of people in prison and the amount we spend to keep them there. The broken families." While in Congress, Tancredo voted each year to attach an amendment, which never passed, that would have prevented the US Justice Department from spending any money to "enforce any drug laws in contradiction to state law."

=== Federal Marriage Amendment ===
Tancredo said in September 2007, "You have to remember that we are always just one kooky judge away from actually having homosexual marriage forced on all the rest of us, because of the [full faith and credit] clause in the U.S. Constitution. Therefore, we need, we absolutely have to have, a constitutional amendment that defines marriage." He is in full support of the Federal Marriage Amendment. Due to his numerous stances opposing the gay rights movement, he has received ratings of 7% from the American Civil Liberties Union, 0% from the Human Rights Campaign, and 19% from the National Association for the Advancement of Colored People. As of 2007, however, Tancredo boasted a 97.8% rating from the American Conservative Union.

=== Barack Obama ===
In a speech given at a campaign event for Colorado Senate candidate Ken Buck on July 8, 2010, Tancredo said of President Barack Obama, "... the greatest threat to the United States today, the greatest threat to our liberty, the greatest threat to the Constitution of the United States, the greatest threat to our way of life; everything we believe in. The greatest threat to the country that our founding fathers put together is the man that's sitting in the White House today."

In April 2010, while not addressing directly widespread "birther" sentiment in the Republican Party, Tancredo said at a South Carolina Tea Party rally about the president: "If his wife says Kenya is his homeland, why don't we just send him back?" On July 22, 2010, in an editorial in The Washington Times, Tancredo said that Congress should bring impeachment charges against President Obama. In February 2012, Tancredo said on Hardball with Chris Matthews, in a discussion of candidate Mitt Romney's economic policy alternatives to the president: "Hell, my dog's better at it than Obama!"

=== City of Miami ===
In a November 19, 2006 interview with WorldNetDaily, Tancredo referred to the city of Miami, Florida as a "Third World country". His comments drew strong criticism from numerous political leaders and organizations, including Florida Governor Jeb Bush who, in a letter to the congressman, called Tancredo's remarks "naive." Tancredo replied in a letter, "I certainly understand and appreciate your need and desire to try and create the illusion of Miami as a multiethnic 'All American' city," he said. "I can also appreciate ... that the cultural and ethnic diversity of the city offers many advantages to its residents. However, it is neither naïve nor insulting to call attention to a real problem that cannot be easily dismissed through politically correct happy talk."

== Private life ==
A former Catholic, Tancredo now attends Cherry Hills Community Church. Tancredo is married to Jackie Tancredo. They met at Drake Junior High School as teachers, and married in 1977. They have two children and five grandchildren.

On February 3, 2009, The Denver Post revealed that Tancredo had probably lost a significant amount of money invested in hedge funds with Agile Group, a Boulder-based investment company with substantial investments in Bernie Madoff's investment firm.

== Electoral history ==
1998 United States House of Representatives elections
Party	Candidate	Votes	%
Republican	Tom Tancredo	111,374	55.91%
Democratic	Henry L. Strauss	82,622	41.48%
Natural Law	George E. Newman	5,152	2.59%
Total votes		199,188	100%
Republican hold			

2000 United States House of Representatives elections
Party	Candidate	Votes	%
Republican	Tom Tancredo (incumbent)	141,410	53.88%
Democratic	Kenneth A. Toltz	110,568	42.12%
Libertarian	Adam David Katz	6,882	2.62%
Concerns of People Party	John Heckman	3,614	1.38%
Total votes		262,477	100%
Republican hold			

2002 United States House of Representatives elections
Party	Candidate	Votes	%
Republican	Tom Tancredo (incumbent)	158,851	66.88%
Democratic	Lance Wright	71,327	30.03%
Libertarian	Adam David Katz	7,323	3.08%
Total votes		237,501	100%
Republican hold			

2004 United States House of Representatives elections
Party	Candidate	Votes	%
Republican	Tom Tancredo (incumbent)	212,778	59.48%
Democratic	Joanna Conti	139,870	39.10%
Libertarian	Jack J. Woehr	3,857	1.08%
Constitution	Peter Shevchuck	1,235	0.35%
Total votes		357,741	100%
Republican hold			

2006 United States House of Representatives elections
Party	Candidate	Votes	%
Republican	Tom Tancredo (incumbent)	158,806	58.61%
Democratic	Bill Winter	108,007	39.87%
Libertarian	Jack J. Woehr	4,093	1.51%
Republican	Juan B. Botero (write-in)	25	0.01%
Total votes		270,931	100%
Republican hold			

2010 Colorado gubernatorial election
Party	Candidate	Votes	%	±%
Democratic	John Hickenlooper	915,436	51.05%	−5.93%
Constitution	Tom Tancredo	652,376	36.38%	+35.76%
Republican	Dan Maes	199,792	11.14%	−29.02%
Libertarian	Jaimes Brown	13,365	0.75%	−0.75%
Independent	Jason R. Clark	8,601	0.48%	—
Independent	Paul Noel Fiorino	3,492	0.19%	—
Write-ins		86	0.00%	—
Majority		263,060	14.67%	−2.15%
Turnout		1,793,148		
Democratic hold				

=== Primary elections ===
2014 Colorado gubernatorial Republican primary
Party	Candidate	Votes	%
Republican	Bob Beauprez	116,333	30.24
Republican	Tom Tancredo	102,830	26.73
Republican	Scott Gessler	89,213	23.19
Republican	Mike Kopp	76,373	19.85
Total votes		384,749	100.00

== Books ==
- In Mortal Danger: The Battle for America's Border and Security. WND Books, 2006. (ISBN 1-58182-527-7)

U.S. House of Representatives
Preceded by Daniel Schaefer	Member of the U.S. House of Representatives from Colorado's 6th congressional district 1999–2009	Succeeded by Mike Coffman
Party political offices
Preceded by Ben Goss; Withdrew	Constitution nominee for Governor of Colorado; 2010	Most recent
U.S. order of precedence (ceremonial)
Preceded by Alex Mooney as Former U.S. Representative	Order of precedence of the United States as Former U.S. Representative	Succeeded by Mike Coffman as Former U.S. Representative
