= 2018 United States House of Representatives elections in Colorado =

- November 6, 2018

All 7 Colorado seats to the United States House of Representatives
- Turnout: 63.58%
	Majority party	Minority party
Party	Democratic	Republican
Last election	3	4
Seats won	4	3
Seat change	▲1	▼1
Popular vote	1,343,211	1,079,772
Percentage	53.44%	42.96%
Swing	▲6.66%	▼4.74%

Democratic
50–60%
60–70%
70–80%
Republican
40–50%
50–60%
60–70%
70–80%
80–90%

The 2018 United States House of Representatives elections in Colorado were held on November 6, 2018, to elect the seven U.S. representatives from the state of Colorado, one from each of the state's seven congressional districts. The Republican and Democratic Party primaries in Colorado were held on June 26, 2018. The elections coincided with the gubernatorial election, as well as other elections to the House of Representatives, elections to the United States Senate, and various state and local elections.

== Overview ==
=== Statewide ===
Party	Candidates	Votes		Seats		
Party	Candidates	No.	%	No.	+/–	%
Democratic	7	1,343,211	53.44	4	▲1	57.14
Republican	7	1,079,772	42.96	3	▼1	42.95
Libertarian	6	58,769	2.34	0	Steady	0.0
Independent	2	27,187	1.08	0	Steady	0.0
Unity	2	4,623	0.18	0	Steady	0.0
Green	5	207	0.01	0	Steady	0.0
Write-in	5	137	0.01	0	Steady	0.0
Total	34	2,513,906	100.0	7	Steady	100.0

Popular vote
Democratic	53.43%
Republican	42.95%
Libertarian	2.34%
Other	1.28%

House seats
Democratic	57.14%
Republican	42.86%

=== By district ===
Results of the 2018 United States House of Representatives elections in Colorado by district:

District	Democratic		Republican		Others		Total		Result
District	Votes	%	Votes	%	Votes	%	Votes	%	Result
District 1	272,886	73.81%	85,207	23.05%	11,622	3.14%	369,715	100.0%	Democratic hold
District 2	259,608	60.27%	144,901	33.64%	26,256	6.09%	430,765	100.0%	Democratic hold
District 3	146,426	43.55%	173,205	51.52%	16,570	4.93%	336,201	100.0%	Republican hold
District 4	145,544	39.38%	224,038	60.61%	38	0.01%	369,620	100.0%	Republican hold
District 5	126,848	39.30%	184,002	57.02%	11,866	3.68%	322,716	100.0%	Republican hold
District 6	187,639	54.10%	148,685	42.87%	10,498	3.03%	346,822	100.0%	Democratic gain
District 7	204,260	60.42%	119,734	35.42%	14,073	4.16%	338,067	100.0%	Democratic hold
Total	1,343,211	53.43%	1,079,772	42.95%	90,924	3.62%	2,513,907	100.0%	

== District 1 ==
2018 Colorado's 1st congressional district election
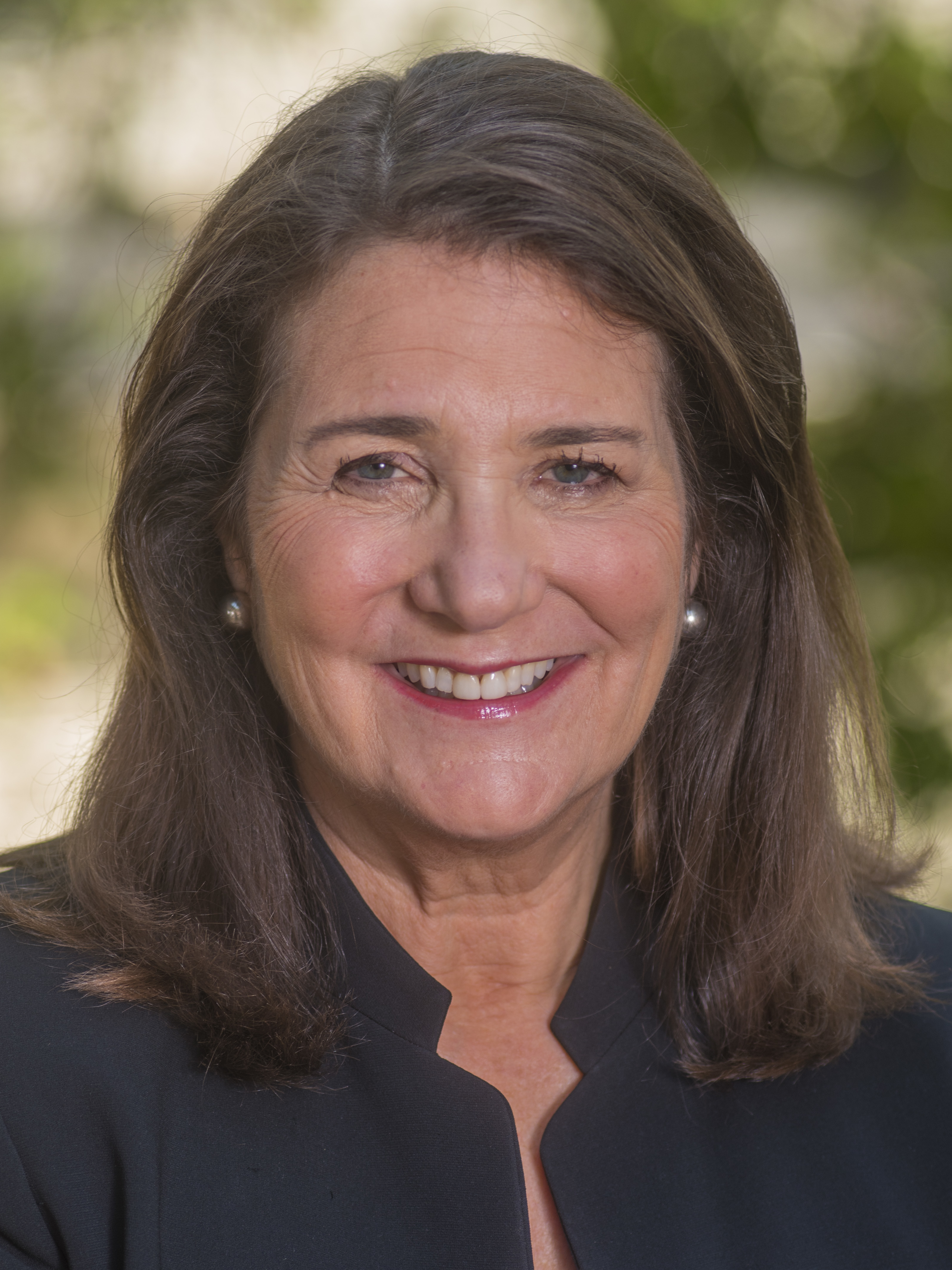

Nominee	Diana DeGette	Casper Stockham
Party	Democratic	Republican
Popular vote	272,886	85,207
Percentage	73.8%	23.0%
- DeGette: 40–50% 50–60% 60–70% 70–80% 80–90% >90% Stockham: 40–50% 50–60% 60–70% No votes
U.S. Representative before election
Diana DeGette
Democratic
Elected U.S. Representative
Diana DeGette
Democratic

The 1st district is located in Central Colorado and includes most of the city of Denver. Incumbent Democrat Diana DeGette, who had represented the district since 1997, ran for re-election. She was re-elected with 68% of the vote in 2016. The district had a PVI of D+21.

=== Democratic primary ===
==== Candidates ====
===== Nominee =====
- Diana DeGette, incumbent U.S. representative

===== Eliminated in primary =====
- Saira Rao, political activist, author, publisher, former Wall Street lawyer and television producer

===== Eliminated at convention =====
- David Sedbrook, self-employed travel industry worker (endorsed DeGette)

==== Endorsements ====
Diana DeGette

Labor unions

- AFL-CIO

Organizations

- NARAL Pro-Choice America
Saira Rao

State legislators

- Joe Salazar, state representative and candidate for attorney general in 2018

Organizations

- Justice Democrats

Local officials

- Rafel Espinoza, Denver City Council member
- Susan-Barnes Gelt, Denver City Council member
- Debbie Ortega, Denver City Council member
- Chaz Tedesco, Adams County Commissioner

Individuals

- Tay Anderson, former candidate for Denver Public School Board of Education
- Denis Berckefeldt, former secretary of the Colorado Democratic Party and nominee for the 3rd district in 2002
- Buie Seawell, former Colorado Democratic Party chair
- Gary Shteyngart, author
- Andrew Yang, founder of Venture for America and 2020 US presidential candidate

==== Results ====
Democratic primary results, Colorado 2018
Party	Candidate	Votes	%
Democratic	Diana DeGette (incumbent)	91,102	68.2
Democratic	Saira Rao	42,398	31.8
Total votes		133,500	100.0

=== Republican primary ===
==== Candidates ====
===== Nominee =====
- Casper Stockham, Uber driver and nominee for this seat in 2016

===== Withdrawn =====
- John Field
- Jeremiah Vialpando

==== Results ====
Republican primary results, October 2018
Party	Candidate	Votes	%
Republican	Casper Stockham	29,933	100.0
Total votes		29,933	100.0

=== Libertarian primary ===
==== Candidates ====
===== Nominee =====
- Raymon Doane, tax examiner

=== General election ===
==== Predictions ====
Source	Ranking	As of
The Cook Political Report	Safe D	November 5, 2018
Inside Elections	Safe D	November 5, 2018
Sabato's Crystal Ball	Safe D	November 5, 2018
RCP	Safe D	November 5, 2018
Daily Kos	Safe D	November 5, 2018
538	Safe D	November 7, 2018
CNN	Safe D	October 31, 2018
Politico	Safe D	November 4, 2018

==== Results ====
Colorado's 1st congressional district results, 2018
Party	Candidate	Votes	%
Democratic	Diana DeGette (incumbent)	272,886	73.8
Republican	Casper Stockham	85,207	23.1
Libertarian	Raymon Doane	11,600	3.1
Write-in		22	0.0
Total votes		369,715	100.0
Democratic hold			

== District 2 ==
2018 Colorado's 2nd congressional district election
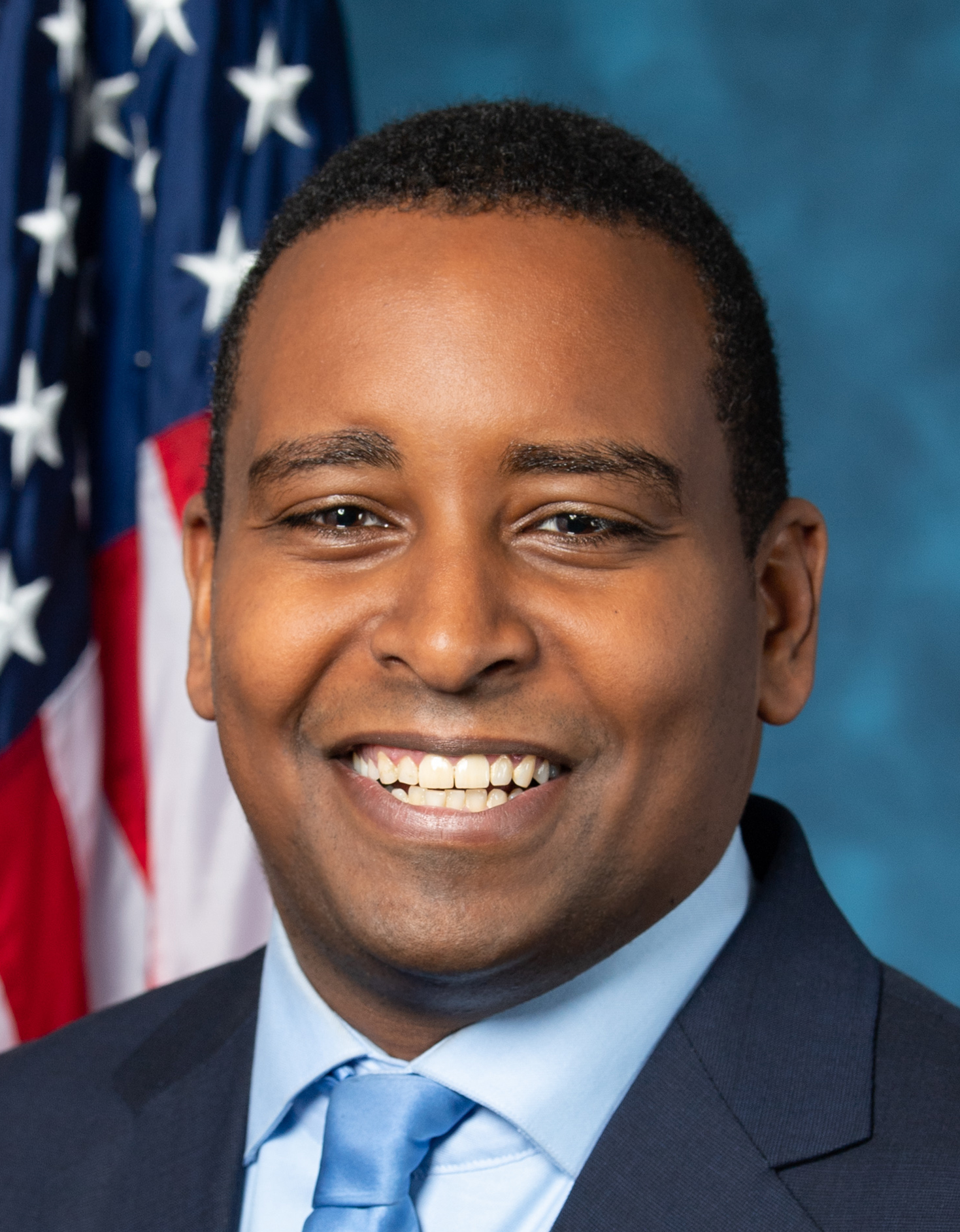

Nominee	Joe Neguse	Peter Yu
Party	Democratic	Republican
Popular vote	259,608	144,901
Percentage	60.3%	33.6%
- Neguse: 40–50% 50–60% 60–70% 70–80% 80–90% >90% Yu: 40–50% 50–60% 60–70% 70–80%
U.S. Representative before election
Jared Polis
Democratic
Elected U.S. Representative
Joe Neguse
Democratic

The 2nd district is located in Northern Colorado and encompasses seven counties. Incumbent Democrat Jared Polis, who had represented the district since 2009, did not run re-election, instead running for Governor. He was re-elected with 57% of the vote in 2016. The district had a PVI of D+9.

=== Democratic primary ===
==== Candidates ====
===== Nominee =====
- Joe Neguse, former regent for the University of Colorado, former executive director of the Colorado Department of Regulatory Agencies, and nominee for Secretary of State of Colorado in 2014

===== Eliminated in primary =====
- Mark Williams, businessman and former chair of the Boulder County Democratic Party

===== Withdrawn =====
- Howard Dotson, pastor and candidate for Loveland City Council in 2017
- Kristopher Larsen, mayor of Nederland
- Kenneth Toltz, businessman and nominee for the 6th district in 2000

===== Declined =====
- Kerry Donovan, state senator for the 5th District (running for re-election)
- Steve Fenberg, state senator
- Dan Gibbs, Summit County Commissioner and former state senator
- Elise Jones, Boulder County Commissioner
- Betsy Markey, former U.S. representative and nominee for state treasurer in 2014
- Shaun McGrath, former mayor of Boulder
- Shannon Watts, founder of Moms Demand Action

==== Endorsements ====
Joe Neguse

U.S. executive branch officials

- Joe Biden, former U.S. vice president
- Ray Mabus, former U.S. Secretary of the Navy
- Ken Salazar, former U.S. senator, Colorado Attorney General and U.S. Secretary of the Interior

U.S. senators

- Kamala Harris, U.S. senator from California

U.S. representatives

- Jim Clyburn, U.S. representative from South Carolina
- Marcia Fudge, U.S. representative from Ohio
- Gabby Giffords, former U.S. representative from Arizona
- Barbara Lee, U.S. representative from California
- Betsy Markey, former U.S. representative from Colorado
- Gregory Meeks, U.S. representative from New York
- Cedric Richmond, U.S. representative from Louisiana
- Terri Sewell, former U.S. representative from Alabama

Statewide officials

- Bernie Buescher, former Secretary of State of Colorado

State senators

- Polly Baca, former
- Bob Bacon, former
- Jeff Bridges
- Steve Fenberg, also co-founder of New Era Colorado with Neguse
- Rhonda Fields
- Joan Fitz-Gerald, former Senate president
- Leroy Garcia
- Lucia Guzman, minority leader
- Rollie Heath, former
- Matt Jones, also candidate for Boulder County commissioner, D3
- John Kefalas
- Andy Kerr
- Dominick Moreno
- Jeanne Nicholson, former
- Dan Pabon
- Dorothy Rupert, former
- Nancy Todd
- Angela Williams

State representatives

- Jeni Arndt
- KC Becker, house majority leader
- Janet Buckner
- Diane Mitsch Bush, also candidate for US Congress, D3
- James Coleman
- Daneya Esgar
- Mark Ferrandino, former speaker
- Mike Foote, candidate for District Attorney
- Alec Garnett
- Joann Ginal
- Matt Gray
- Millie Hamner
- Chris Hansen
- Leslie Herod
- Edie Hooton
- Dickey Lee Hullinghorst, former speaker
- Chris Kennedy
- Tracy Kraft-Tharp
- Claire Levy, former
- Alice Madden, former majority leader and candidate for CU Regent
- Jovan Melton
- Angie Paccione, former
- Brittany Pettersen
- Tom Plant, former
- Joe Rice, former
- Todd Saliman, former
- Jonathan Singer
- Wilma Webb, former state representative
- Faith Winter
- Ruth Wright, former

Labor unions

- AFL-CIO
- American Federation of Teachers
- Colorado Education Association
- Colorado Professional Fire Fighters
- Pipefitters #208
- Pipefitters #301
- Southwest Regional Council of Carpenters

Organizations

- Blue Rising PAC
- Congressional Progressive Caucus
- Council for a Livable World
- Democracy for America
- End Citizens United
- Giffords
- Humane Society of the United States
- League of Conservation Voters
- NARAL Pro-Choice America
- Planned Parenthood Action Fund

Mayors

- Christine Berg, mayor of Lafayette
- Kevin Burns, mayor of Dillon
- Leslie Durgen, former mayor of Boulder
- Suzanne Jones, mayor of Boulder
- Susan Kirkpatrick, former mayor of Fort Collins
- Kris Larsen, mayor of Nederland
- Jacki Marsh, mayor of Loveland
- Bob Muckle, mayor of Louisville
- Susan Osbourne, former mayor of Boulder
- Connie Sullivan, mayor of Lyons
- Will Toor, former mayor of Boulder
- Wellington Webb, former mayor of Denver

City councilors (Boulder)

- Robin Bohanan, former
- Jan Burton, former
- Macon Cowles, former
- Angelique Espinoza, former
- Jill Grano
- Sally Martin, former
- Francois Poinsatte, former
- Andrew Schoemaker, former
- Andy Schultehsis, former
- Sam Weaver
- Ken Wilson, former
- Bob Yates

City councilors (other)

- Richard Ball, Loveland
- Guyleen Castriota, Broomfield
- Bette Erickson, Broomfield
- Jamie Harkins, Lafayette
- Stan Jezierski, Broomfield
- Leah Johnson, Loveland
- Bob Overbeck, Fort Collins
- Deven Shaff, Broomfield
- Kristi Stephens, Fort Collins, former
- Sharron Tessier, Broomfield

County officials (Boulder)

- Joel Davidow, former Boulder County Democratic Party chair
- Cindy Domenico, commissioner
- Deb Gardner, commissioner
- Stan Garnett, former District Attorney
- Dan Gould, former Boulder County Democratic Party chair
- Josie Heath, former commissioner
- Bob Hullinghorst, former treasurer
- Elise Jones, commissioner
- Bean Pearlman, former commissioner
- Joe Pelle, sheriff
- Laura Spicer, former Boulder County Democratic Party vice chair
- Paul Weissman, treasurer

County officials (others)

- Beverly Breakstone, Summit County assessor
- Sandy Briggs, former Summit County Democratic Party chair
- Bruce Brown, district attorney, D5
- Thomas Davidson, Summit County commissioner
- Judy Enderle, former Broomfield County Democratic Party chair
- Dan Gibbs, Summit County commissioner
- Tim Mauch, Clear Creek County commissioner
- Tom Mehling, former Broomfield County Democratic Party chair
- Kathy Plomer, Adams 12 school board member
- Jill Ryan, Eagle County commissioner
- Karn Stiegelmeiser, Summit County commissioner
- Randy Wheelock, former Clear Creek county commissioner

Others

- Suzy Ageton, former Boulder deputy mayor
- Aaron Brocket, Boulder mayor pro tem
- Noah Finkelsteni, director of Colorado Center for STEM Learning
- Val Flores, state board of education member
- Mark Lacis, Superior Town trustee
- Neal Lurie, president of Center for Resource Conservation
- Sean Maher, former executive director of Boulder Small Business Development Center
- Nikhi Mankekar, deputy chairperson of Boulder Human Relations Commission
- Rich Pelletier, former deputy campaign manager for Bernie Sanders
- JoyAnn Ruscha, former Colorado political director for Bernie Sanders for president

==== Results ====
Democratic primary results, Colorado 2018
Party	Candidate	Votes	%
Democratic	Joe Neguse	76,829	65.7
Democratic	Mark Williams	40,044	34.3
Total votes		116,873	100.0

=== Republican primary ===
==== Candidates ====
===== Nominee =====
- Peter Yu, businessman

==== Results ====
Republican primary results, Colorado 2018
Party	Candidate	Votes	%
Republican	Peter Yu	45,970	100.0
Total votes		45,970	100.0

=== Libertarian primary ===
==== Candidates ====
===== Nominee =====
- Roger Barris

===== Withdrawn =====
- Todd Mitchem

=== Independents ===
==== Candidates ====
- Nick Thomas

=== General election ===
==== Predictions ====
Source	Ranking	As of
The Cook Political Report	Safe D	November 5, 2018
Inside Elections	Safe D	November 5, 2018
Sabato's Crystal Ball	Safe D	November 5, 2018
RCP	Safe D	November 5, 2018
Daily Kos	Safe D	November 5, 2018
538	Safe D	November 7, 2018
CNN	Safe D	October 31, 2018
Politico	Safe D	November 4, 2018

==== Results ====
Colorado's 2nd congressional district results, 2018
Party	Candidate	Votes	%
Democratic	Joe Neguse	259,608	60.3
Republican	Peter Yu	144,901	33.6
Independent	Nick Thomas	16,356	3.8
Libertarian	Roger Barris	9,749	2.3
Green	Kevin Alumbaugh (write-in)	151	0.0
Total votes		430,765	100.0
Democratic hold			

== District 3 ==
2018 Colorado's 3rd congressional district election
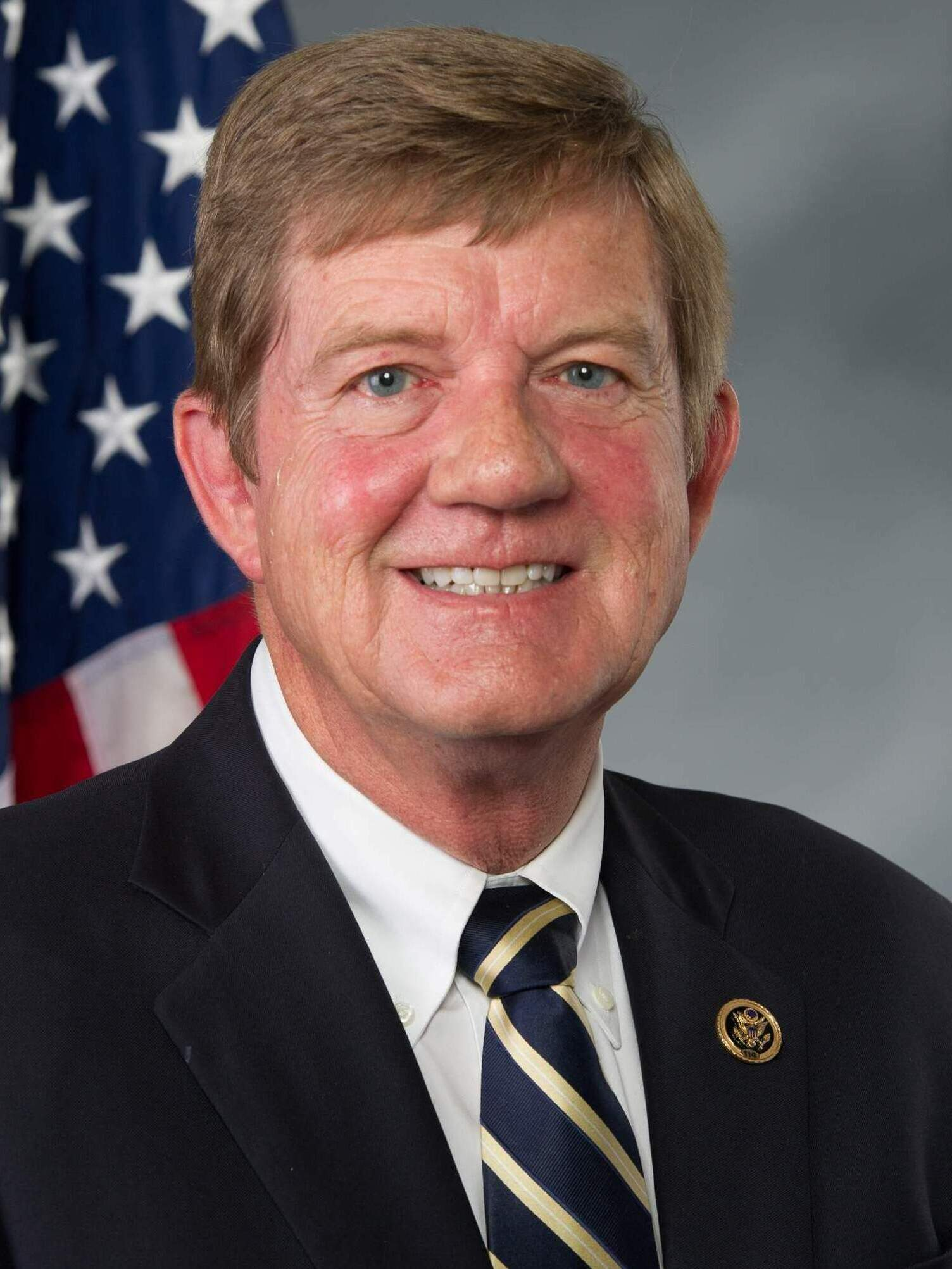

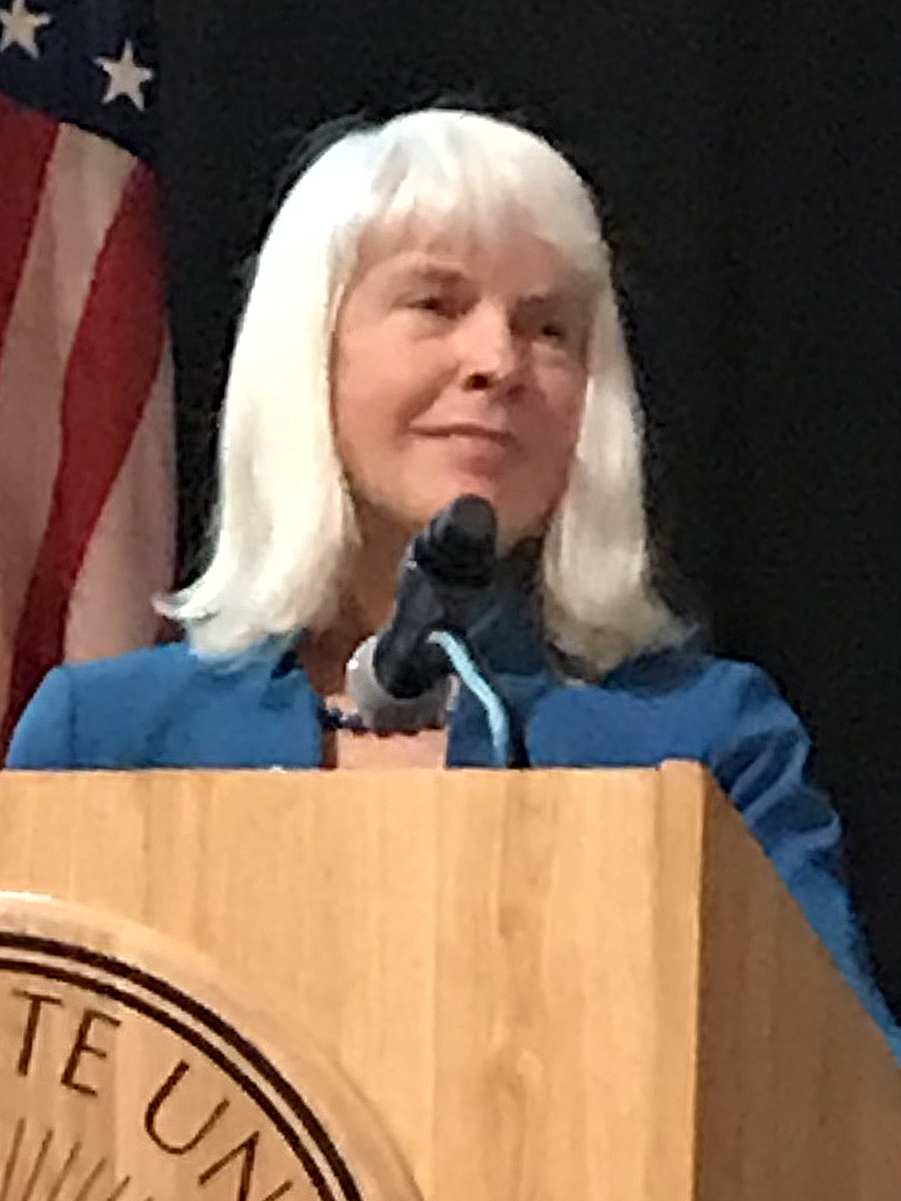
Nominee	Scott Tipton	Diane Mitsch Bush
Party	Republican	Democratic
Popular vote	173,205	146,426
Percentage	51.5%	43.6%
- Tipton: 40–50% 50–60% 60–70% 70–80% 80–90% >90% Bush: 40–50% 50–60% 60–70% 70–80% 80–90% Tie: 40–50%
U.S. Representative before election
Scott Tipton
Republican
Elected U.S. Representative
Scott Tipton
Republican

The 3rd district is located in Western and Southern Colorado and includes a large number of sparsely populated counties and the city of Grand Junction. Incumbent Republican Scott Tipton, who had represented the district since 2011, ran for re-election. He was re-elected with 55% of the vote in 2016. The district had a PVI of R+6.

=== Republican primary ===
==== Candidates ====
===== Nominee =====
- Scott Tipton, incumbent U.S. representative

==== Results ====
Republican primary results, Colorado 2018
Party	Candidate	Votes	%
Republican	Scott Tipton (incumbent)	66,854	100.0
Total votes		66,854	100.0

=== Democratic primary ===
This was one of 80 Republican-held House districts targeted by the Democratic Congressional Campaign Committee in 2018.

==== Candidates ====
===== Nominee =====
- Diane Mitsch Bush, former state representative

===== Eliminated in primary =====
- Karl Hanlon, Glenwood Springs city attorney
- Arn Menconi, former Eagle County commissioner

===== Withdrawn =====
- Chris Kennedy, Grand Junction city councilman

===== Declined =====
- Kerry Donovan, state senator for the 5th District (running for re-election)

==== Results ====
Democratic primary results, Colorado 2018
Party	Candidate	Votes	%
Democratic	Diane Mitsch Bush	44,809	64.1
Democratic	Karl Hanlon	19,368	27.7
Democratic	Arn Menconi	5,754	8.2
Total votes		69,931	100.0

=== General election ===
==== Polling ====
Poll source	Date(s) administered	Sample size	Margin of error	Scott Tipton (R)	Diane Mitsch Bush (D)	Other	Undecided
JMC Analytics/Bold Blue Campaigns	October 27 – November 2, 2018	500	± 4.5%	46%	41%	5%	7%
Change Research (D)	October 27–29, 2018	485	–	53%	38%	–	9%

==== Predictions ====
Source	Ranking	As of
The Cook Political Report	Likely R	November 5, 2018
Inside Elections	Safe R	November 5, 2018
Sabato's Crystal Ball	Lean R	November 5, 2018
RCP	Likely R	November 5, 2018
Daily Kos	Likely R	November 5, 2018
538	Likely R	November 7, 2018
CNN	Safe R	October 31, 2018
Politico	Likely R	November 4, 2018

==== Results ====
Colorado's 3rd congressional district, 2018
Party	Candidate	Votes	%
Republican	Scott Tipton (incumbent)	173,205	51.5
Democratic	Diane Mitsch Bush	146,426	43.6
Independent	Mary Malarsie	10,831	3.2
Libertarian	Gaylon Kent	5,727	1.7
Green	Gary Swing (write-in)	9	0.0
Write-in		3	0.0
Total votes		336,201	100
Republican hold			

== District 4 ==
2018 Colorado's 4th congressional district election
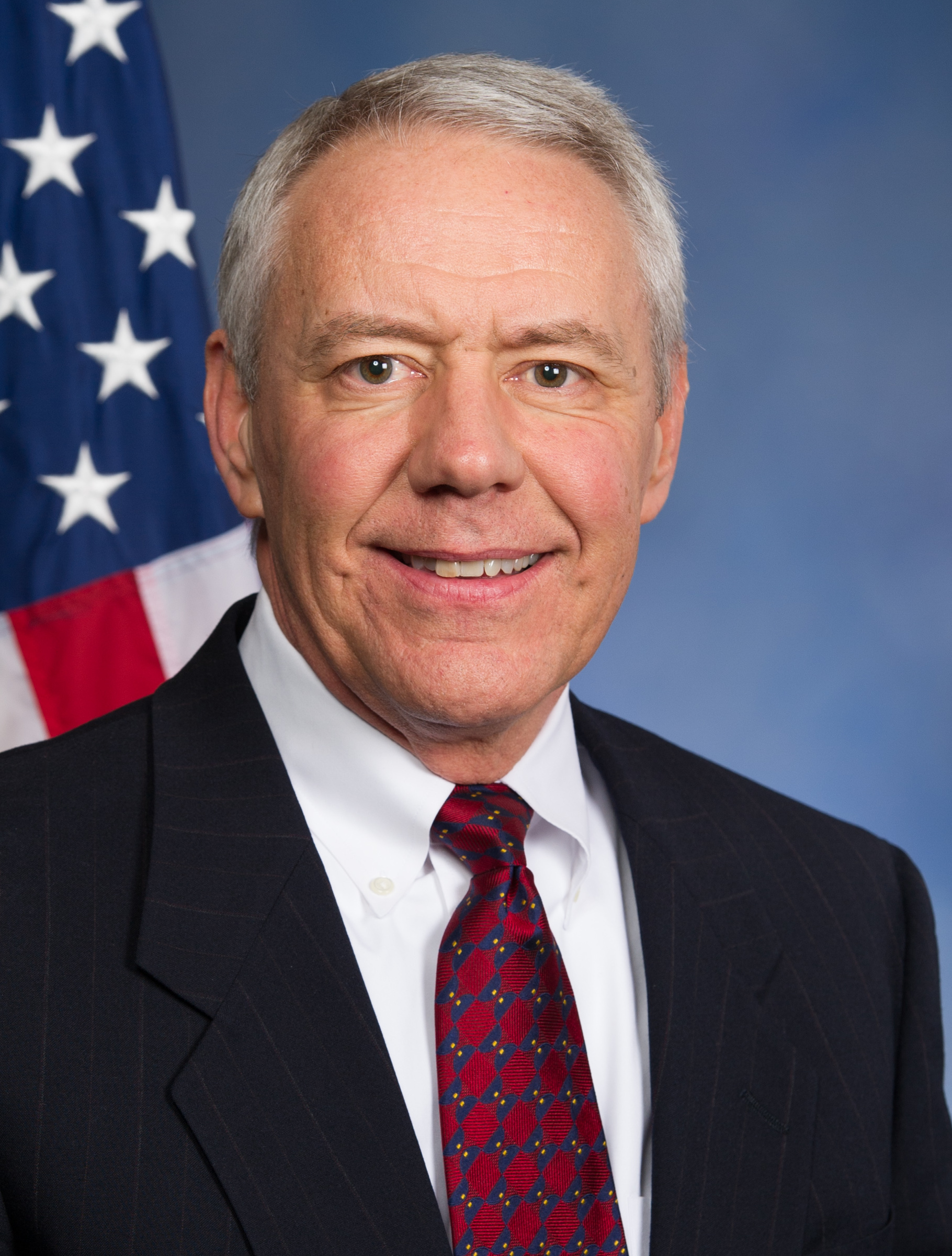

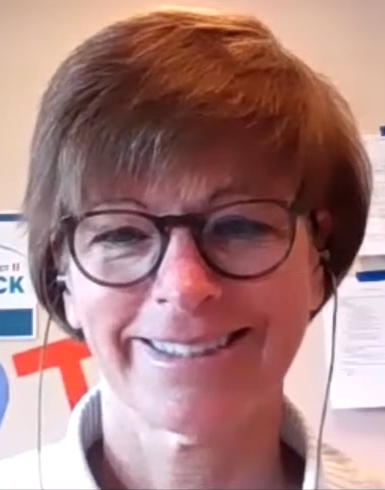
Nominee	Ken Buck	Karen McCormick
Party	Republican	Democratic
Popular vote	224,038	145,544
Percentage	60.6%	33.6%
- Buck: 50–60% 60–70% 70–80% 80–90% >90% McCormick: 50–60% 60–70% 70–80% 80–90% No votes
U.S. Representative before election
Ken Buck
Republican
Elected U.S. Representative
Ken Buck
Republican

The 4th district is located in Eastern Colorado and includes numerous sparsely populated counties. Incumbent Republican Ken Buck, who had represented the district since 2015, ran for re-election. He was re-elected with 64% of the vote in 2016. The district had a PVI of R+13.

=== Republican primary ===
==== Candidates ====
===== Nominee =====
- Ken Buck, incumbent U.S. representative

===== Eliminated at convention =====
- Jim Gunning, former mayor of Lone Tree

==== Results ====
Republican primary results, Colorado 2018
Party	Candidate	Votes	%
Republican	Ken Buck (incumbent)	85,290	100.0
Total votes		85,290	100.0

=== Democratic primary ===
==== Candidates ====
===== Nominee =====
- Karen McCormick, veterinarian

===== Eliminated in primary =====
- Chase Kohne, veteran, veterinarian and small business owner

===== Eliminated at convention =====
- Larry Germanson
- Richard Weil

==== Endorsements ====
Chase Kohne

Organizations

- Blue Rising PAC

Newspapers

- Greeley Tribune

==== Results ====
Primary results by county: McCormick: 50–60%; 60–70%; 70–80%

Democratic primary results, Colorado 2018
Party	Candidate	Votes	%
Democratic	Karen McCormick	37,120	64.7
Democratic	Chase Kohne	20,269	35.3
Total votes		57,389	100.0

=== General election ===
==== Predictions ====
Source	Ranking	As of
The Cook Political Report	Safe R	November 5, 2018
Inside Elections	Safe R	November 5, 2018
Sabato's Crystal Ball	Safe R	November 5, 2018
RCP	Safe R	November 5, 2018
Daily Kos	Safe R	November 5, 2018
538	Safe R	November 7, 2018
CNN	Safe R	October 31, 2018
Politico	Safe R	November 4, 2018

==== Results ====
Colorado's 4th congressional district results, 2018
Party	Candidate	Votes	%
Republican	Ken Buck (incumbent)	224,038	60.6
Democratic	Karen McCormick	145,544	39.4
Green	John Vigil (write-in)	26	0.0
Write-in		12	0.0
Total votes		369,620	100.0
Republican hold			

== District 5 ==
2018 Colorado's 5th congressional district election
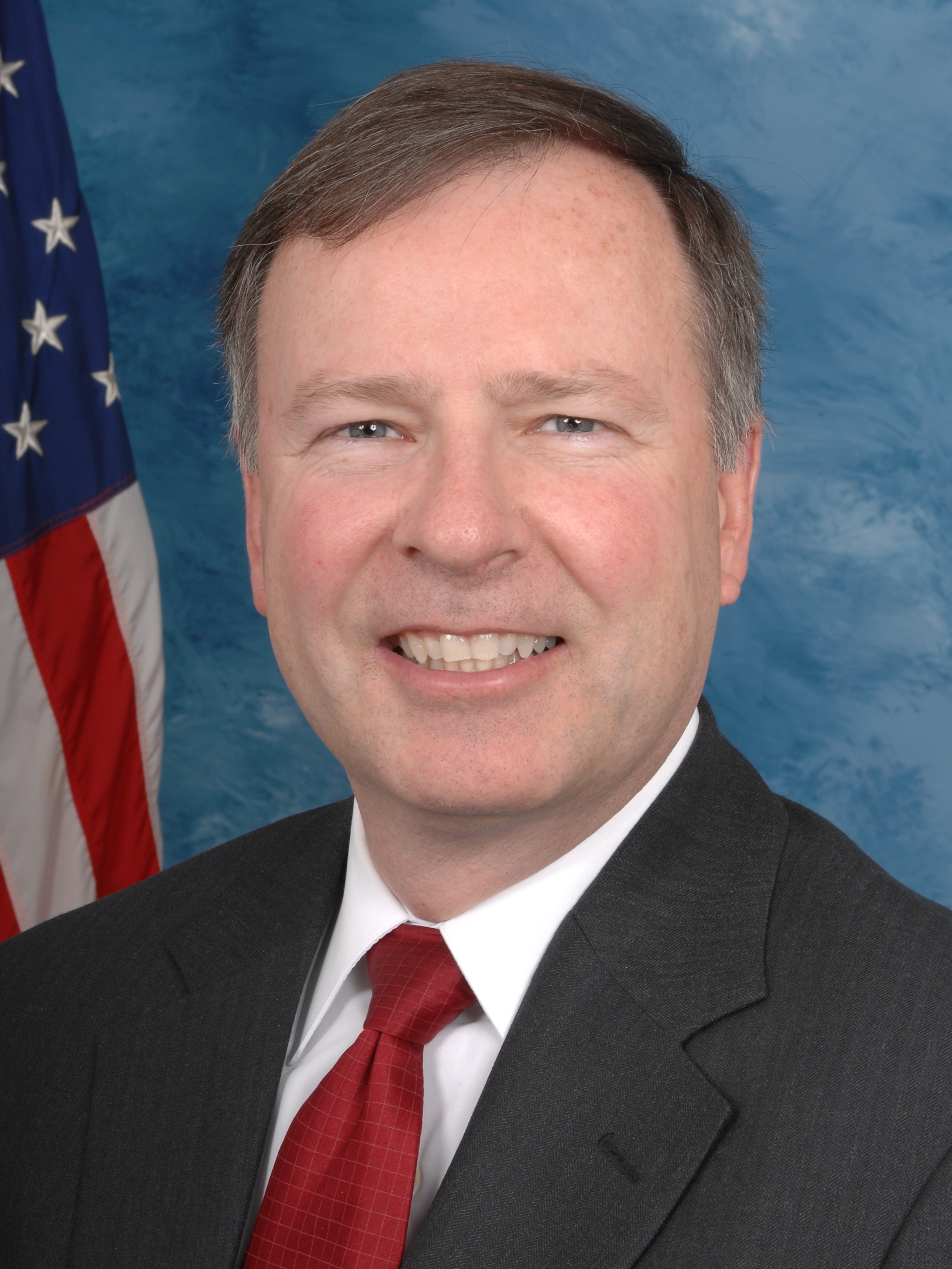

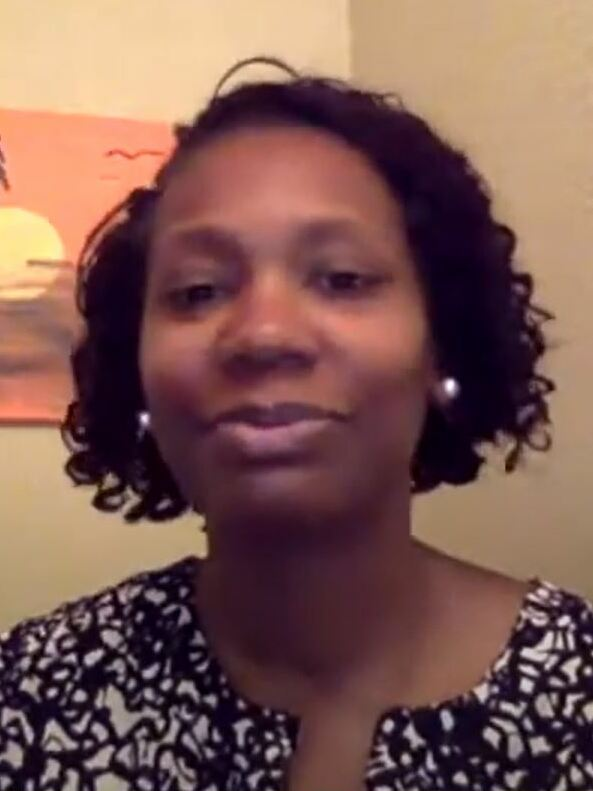
Nominee	Doug Lamborn	Stephany Rose Spaulding
Party	Republican	Democratic
Popular vote	184,002	126,848
Percentage	57.0%	39.3%
- Lamborn: 40–50% 50–60% 60–70% 70–80% 80–90% Spaulding: 40–50% 50–60% 60–70% 70–80% 80–90%
U.S. Representative before election
Doug Lamborn
Republican
Elected U.S. Representative
Doug Lamborn
Republican

The 5th district is located in Central Colorado and includes Fremont, El Paso, Teller and Chaffee counties and the city of Colorado Springs. Incumbent Republican Doug Lamborn, who had represented the district since 2007, ran for re-election. He was re-elected with 62% of the vote in 2016. The district had a PVI of R+14.

=== Republican primary ===
==== Candidates ====
===== Nominee =====
- Doug Lamborn, incumbent U.S. representative

===== Eliminated in primary =====
- Darryl Glenn, El Paso County Commissioner and nominee for the U.S. Senate in 2016
- Owen Hill, state senator
- Bill Rhea, retired Texas judge
- Tyler Stevens, former Green Mountain Falls mayor

==== Withdrawn ====
- Tom Strand, Colorado Springs City Council member

==== Polling ====
Poll source	Date(s) administered	Sample size	Margin of error	Darryl Glenn	Owen Hill	Doug Lamborn	Bill Rhea	Tyler Stevens	Undecided
Magellan Strategies	May 20–21, 2018	519	± 4.3%	27%	10%	37%	2%	3%	21%

==== Results ====
Republican primary results, Colorado 2018
Party	Candidate	Votes	%
Republican	Doug Lamborn (incumbent)	54,974	52.2
Republican	Darryl Glenn	21,479	20.4
Republican	Owen Hill	19,141	18.2
Republican	Bill Rhea	6,167	5.9
Republican	Tyler Stevens	3,643	3.5
Total votes		105,404	100.0

=== Democratic primary ===
==== Candidates ====
===== Nominee =====
- Stephany Rose Spaulding, activist, public commentator, pastor of Ebenezer Baptist Church in Colorado Springs, and associate professor of Women's and Ethnic Studies at the University of Colorado Colorado Springs

===== Eliminated in primary =====
- Marcus Murphy (write-in)

===== Eliminated at convention =====
- Betty Field, social worker and former executive director for the Black Hills Center for Equality
- Lori Furstenberg
- Kimberly Sugarmen

==== Results ====
Democratic primary results, Colorado 2018
Party	Candidate	Votes	%
Democratic	Stephany Rose Spaulding	45,466	99.9
Write-in		38	0.1
Total votes		45,504	100.0

=== Libertarian primary ===
==== Candidates ====
===== Nominee =====
- Douglas Randall

=== General election ===
==== Predictions ====
Source	Ranking	As of
The Cook Political Report	Safe R	November 5, 2018
Inside Elections	Safe R	November 5, 2018
Sabato's Crystal Ball	Safe R	November 5, 2018
RCP	Safe R	November 5, 2018
Daily Kos	Safe R	November 5, 2018
538	Safe R	November 7, 2018
CNN	Safe R	October 31, 2018
Politico	Safe R	November 4, 2018

==== Results ====
Colorado's 5th congressional district results, 2018
Party	Candidate	Votes	%
Republican	Doug Lamborn (incumbent)	184,002	57.0
Democratic	Stephany Rose Spaulding	126,848	39.3
Libertarian	Douglas Randall	11,795	3.7
Unity	John Croom (write-in)	16	0.0
Write-in		55	0.0
Total votes		322,716	100.0
Republican hold			

== District 6 ==
2018 Colorado's 6th congressional district election
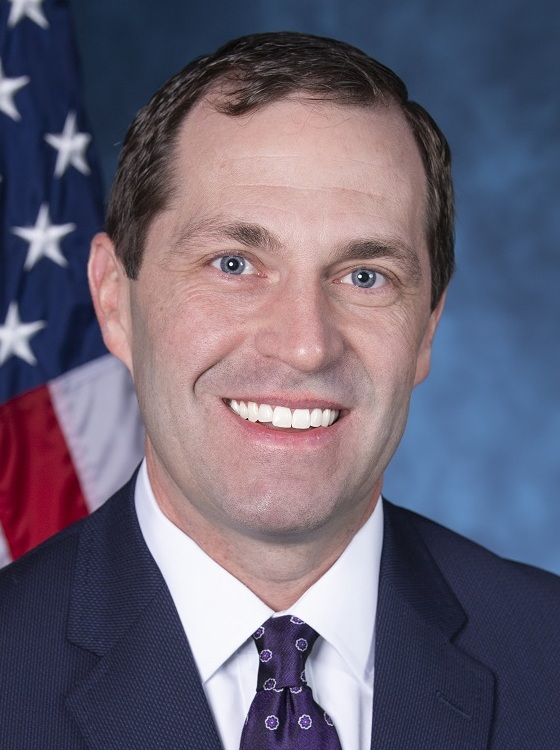

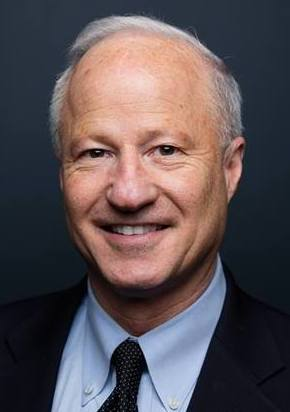
Nominee	Jason Crow	Mike Coffman
Party	Democratic	Republican
Popular vote	187,639	148,685
Percentage	54.1%	42.9%
- Crow: 40–50% 50–60% 60–70% 70–80% Coffman: 40–50% 50–60% 60–70% 70–80% No votes
U.S. Representative before election
Mike Coffman
Republican
Elected U.S. Representative
Jason Crow
Democratic

The 6th district is located in Central Colorado and surrounds the city of Denver from the east, including the city of Aurora. Incumbent Republican Mike Coffman, who had represented the district since 2009, ran for re-election. He was re-elected with 51% of the vote in 2016. The district had a PVI of D+2.

=== Republican primary ===
==== Candidates ====
===== Nominee =====
- Mike Coffman, incumbent U.S. representative

==== Results ====
Republican primary results, Colorado 2018
Party	Candidate	Votes	%
Republican	Mike Coffman (incumbent)	56,703	100.0
Total votes		56,703	100.0

=== Democratic primary ===
This was one of 80 Republican-held House districts targeted by the Democratic Congressional Campaign Committee in 2018.

==== Candidates ====
===== Nominee =====
- Jason Crow, attorney

===== Eliminated in primary =====
- Levi Tillemann, businessman

===== Withdrawn =====
- David Aarestad, attorney and former candidate for the Cherry Creek School District
- Gabriel McArthur, Bernie Sanders delegate to the 2016 Democratic National Convention (endorsed Tillemann)

==== Results ====
Democratic primary results, Colorado 2018
Party	Candidate	Votes	%
Democratic	Jason Crow	49,851	65.9
Democratic	Levi Tillemann	25,757	34.1
Total votes		75,608	100.0

=== General election ===
==== Endorsements ====
Mike Coffman (R)

Organizations

- Citizens for Responsible Energy Solutions

Newspapers

- The Denver Post
Jason Crow (D)

Organizations

- Democratic Congressional Campaign Committee "Red to Blue" Program

==== Polling ====
Poll source	Date(s) administered	Sample size	Margin of error	Mike Coffman (R)	Jason Crow (D)	Undecided
NYT Upshot/Siena College	October 13–17, 2018	506	± 4.5%	38%	47%	9%
Normington, Petts & Associates (D)	September 18–23, 2018	400	± 4.9%	38%	49%	13%
NYT Upshot/Siena College	September 12–14, 2018	500	± 4.8%	40%	51%	9%
The Tarrance Group (R-Coffman)	September 11–13, 2018	400	± 4.9%	45%	46%	9%
IMGE Insights (R)	July 9–12, 2018	400	–	45%	45%	10%
Global Strategy Group (D-Crow)	July 11–17, 2018	506	± 4.4%	45%	47%	8%
Normington, Petts & Associates (D)	July 9–11, 2018	400	–	44%	41%	15%
Public Policy Polling (D)	February 15–18, 2018	751	± 3.6%	39%	44%	17%
Public Policy Polling (D)	October 5–8, 2017	742	± 3.6%	43%	36%	21%

==== Predictions ====
Source	Ranking	As of
The Cook Political Report	Lean D (flip)	November 5, 2018
Inside Elections	Tilt D (flip)	November 5, 2018
Sabato's Crystal Ball	Lean D (flip)	November 5, 2018
RCP	Lean D (flip)	November 5, 2018
Daily Kos	Lean D (flip)	November 5, 2018
538	Likely D (flip)	November 7, 2018
CNN	Lean D (flip)	October 31, 2018
Politico	Lean D (flip)	November 4, 2018

==== Results ====
Colorado's 6th congressional district results, 2018
Party	Candidate	Votes	%
Democratic	Jason Crow	187,639	54.1
Republican	Mike Coffman (incumbent)	148,685	42.9
Libertarian	Kat Martin	5,886	1.7
Unity	Dan Chapin	4,607	1.3
Green	Christopher Allen (write-in)	5	0.0
Total votes		346,822	100.0
Democratic gain from Republican			

== District 7 ==
2018 Colorado's 7th congressional district election
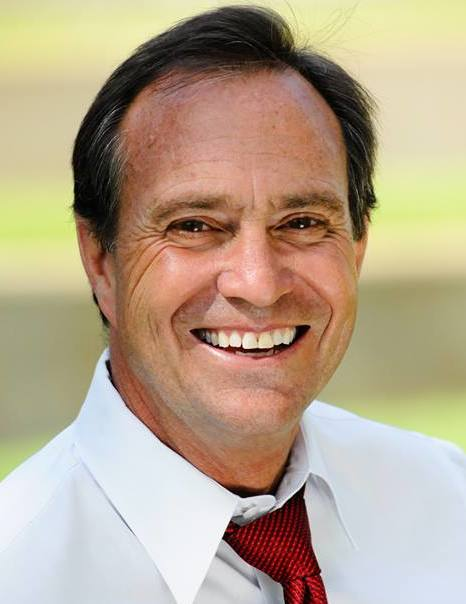

Nominee	Ed Perlmutter	Mark Barrington
Party	Democratic	Republican
Popular vote	204,260	119,734
Percentage	60.4%	35.4%
- Perlmutter: 40–50% 50–60% 60–70% 70–80% 80–90% Barrington: 40–50% 50–60% 60–70% 70–80% Tie: 40–50% No votes
U.S. Representative before election
Ed Perlmutter
Democratic
Elected U.S. Representative
Ed Perlmutter
Democratic

The 7th district is located in Central Colorado, to the north and west of Denver and includes the cities of Thornton and Westminster and most of Lakewood. Incumbent Democrat Ed Perlmutter, who had represented the district since 2007, ran for re-election. He was re-elected with 55% of the vote in 2016. The district had a PVI of D+6.

=== Democratic primary ===
Perlmutter announced a run for governor, but later withdrew from that race. He later announced that he would not run for re-election. However, on August 21, 2017, he announced that he had changed his mind.

==== Candidates ====
===== Nominee =====
- Ed Perlmutter, incumbent U.S. representative

===== Withdrawn =====
- Daniel Baer, former U.S. ambassador to the Organization for Security and Co-operation in Europe
- Andy Kerr, state senator
- Dominick Moreno, state senator
- Brittany Pettersen, state representative

==== Results ====
Democratic primary results, Colorado 2018
Party	Candidate	Votes	%
Democratic	Ed Perlmutter (incumbent)	81,991	100.0
Total votes		81,991	100.0

=== Republican primary ===
Colorado's 7th district was included on the initial list of Democratic-held seats being targeted by the National Republican Congressional Committee in 2018.

==== Candidates ====
===== Nominee =====
- Mark Barrington, Lakewood businessman

===== Declined =====
- Don Ytterberg, former chair of the Jefferson County Republican Party, former vice chair of the Colorado Republican Party and nominee for this seat in 2014

==== Results ====
Republican primary results, Colorado 2018
Party	Candidate	Votes	%
Republican	Mark Barrington	46,028	100.0
Total votes		46,028	100.0

=== Independents ===
==== Candidates ====
- Nathan Clay

=== General election ===
==== Predictions ====
Source	Ranking	As of
The Cook Political Report	Safe D	November 5, 2018
Inside Elections	Safe D	November 5, 2018
Sabato's Crystal Ball	Safe D	November 5, 2018
RCP	Safe D	November 5, 2018
Daily Kos	Safe D	November 5, 2018
538	Safe D	November 7, 2018
CNN	Safe D	October 31, 2018
Politico	Safe D	November 4, 2018

==== Results ====
Colorado's 7th congressional district results, 2018
Party	Candidate	Votes	%
Democratic	Ed Perlmutter (incumbent)	204,260	60.4
Republican	Mark Barrington	119,734	35.4
Libertarian	Jennifer Nackerud	14,012	4.1
Green	Michael Haughey (write-in)	16	0.0
Write-in		45	0.0
Total votes		338,067	100.0
Democratic hold			
