= Second Amendment Caucus =

US congressional caucus

- Co-Chairs: Thomas Massie (KY-4); Lauren Boebert (CO-4)
- Founded: December 8, 2016; 9 years ago
- Ideology: Second Amendment rights advocacy
- National affiliation: Republican Party
- Colors: Red
- Seats in the House Republican Caucus: 15 / 220
- Seats in the House: 15 / 435

The Second Amendment Caucus, also known as the House Second Amendment Caucus, is a congressional caucus consisting of conservative and libertarian Republican members of the United States House of Representatives who support Second Amendment rights. It was formed in 2016 to "promote a pro-gun agenda" according to founding chairman Thomas Massie.

== Electoral results ==
Election year	Overall seats	Republican seats	±
2016	14 / 435	14 / 241	
2018	13 / 435	13 / 199	-1
2020	11 / 435	11 / 211	-2

== History ==
The Second Amendment Caucus was originally established in 2004 by Representative Marilyn Musgrave (R-CO) and existed under that name until 2008. Representative Paul Broun (R-GA) recreated it in 2009 and titled it the Second Amendment Task Force. Thomas Massie reestablished it in December 2016 in light of the 2016 election results with 13 other congressmen.

== Members ==
Second Amendment Caucus in the 118th United States Congress

Arizona
- Paul Gosar (R‑AZ‑4, Prescott)

California

- Darrell Issa (R‑CA‑50, San Diego)

Colorado

- Lauren Boebert (R‑CO‑3, Rifle) Co-Chair

Georgia

- Marjorie Taylor Greene (R‑GA‑14, Rome)

Kentucky

- James Comer (R‑KY‑1, Tompkinsville)
- Thomas Massie (R‑KY‑4, Garrison) Co-Chair

Kansas

- Tracey Mann (R‑KS‑1, Salina)

Ohio

- Warren Davidson (R‑OH‑8, Troy)

Pennsylvania

- Scott Perry (R‑PA‑10, Dillsburg)

South Carolina

- Jeff Duncan (R‑SC‑3, Laurens)

Texas

- Pat Fallon (R‑TX‑4, Sherman)
- Brian Babin (R‑TX‑36, Woodville)

Wisconsin

- Glenn Grothman (R‑WI‑6, Fond du Lac)

== Former members ==
Florida
- Ted Yoho (R‑FL‑3)

Georgia

- Jody Hice (R‑GA‑10, Bethlehem)

North Carolina

- Mark Meadows (R‑NC‑11)

Michigan

- Justin Amash (R‑MI‑3)

West Virginia

- Alex Mooney (R‑WV‑2, Charles Town)

== See also ==
- Freedom Caucus
- Liberty Caucus
