= Lauren Boebert =

American politician (born 1986)

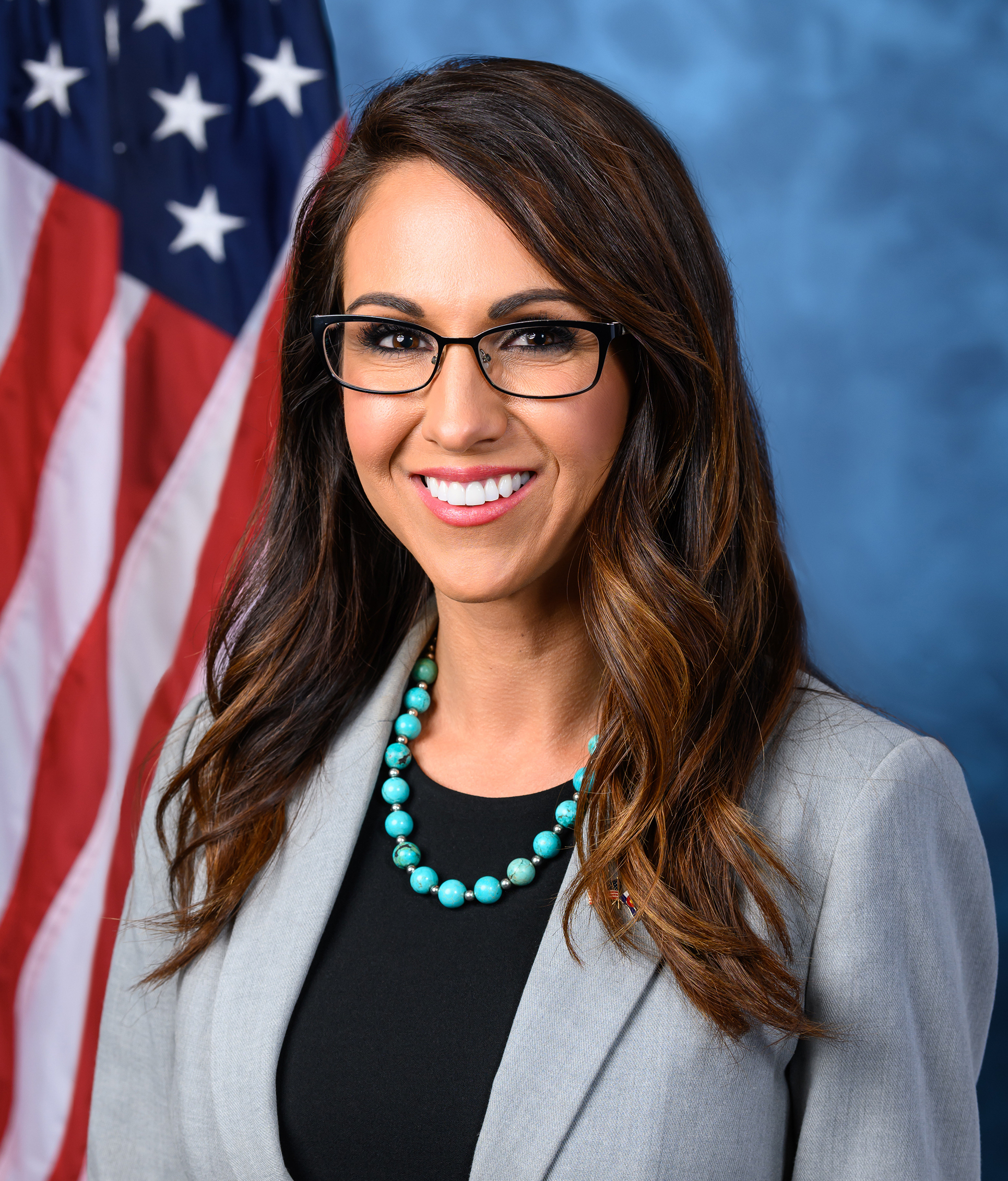
- Official portrait, 2020

Member of the U.S. House of Representatives from Colorado
- Incumbent
- Assumed office January 3, 2025
- Preceded by: Greg Lopez
- Constituency: 4th district
- In office January 3, 2021 – January 3, 2025
- Preceded by: Scott Tipton
- Succeeded by: Jeff Hurd
- Constituency: 3rd district

Personal details
- Born: Lauren Opal Roberts; December 19, 1986 (age 39) Altamonte Springs, Florida, U.S.
- Party: Democratic (2006–2008); Republican (2008–present)
- Spouse: Jayson Boebert (m. 2007; div. 2023)
- Children: 4
- Website: House website Campaign website
- Lauren Boebert's voice Boebert offering an amendment to the REINS Act; Recorded June 14, 2023

Lauren Opal Boebert (/ˈboʊbərt/ BOH-bərt; née Roberts; born December 19, 1986) is an American politician, businesswoman, and gun rights activist serving as the U.S. representative for Colorado's 4th congressional district from 2025, having previously represented Colorado's 3rd congressional district from 2021 to 2025. From 2013 to 2022, she owned Shooters Grill, a restaurant in Rifle, Colorado, where staff members were encouraged to carry firearms openly.

A member of the Republican Party, Boebert is known for her gun rights advocacy. In 2020, she defeated 5-term incumbent Scott Tipton in an upset victory in the primary of Colorado's 3rd congressional district and went on to win the general election over Democratic nominee Diane Mitsch Bush. In Congress, Boebert has associated herself with the conservative Republican Study Committee, the right-wing Freedom Caucus, of which she became the communications chair in January 2022, and the pro-gun Second Amendment Caucus. She won reelection in 2022 by a narrow margin of 546 votes against former Aspen City Council member Adam Frisch. Boebert was reelected to a third term in 2024 after switching to Colorado's 4th congressional district. In 2026, she unsuccessfully ran for re-election against Eileen Laubacher in a close race.

Boebert's views are considered by some to be far-right, a label she rejects. She is an ally and supporter of president Donald Trump and supports Trump's false claim that the 2020 election was stolen from him and voted to overturn its results during the Electoral College vote count. She has also promoted the QAnon conspiracy theory. Boebert opposes transitioning to green energy, COVID-19 mask and vaccine mandates, abortion, sex education, gender-affirming surgery for minors, and same-sex marriage. She advocates an isolationist foreign policy but supports closer ties with Israel for religious reasons. A self-described born-again Christian, Boebert has said that she is "tired of this separation of church and state junk" and argued for greater church power and influence in government decision-making.

== Early life ==
Lauren Opal Roberts was born in Altamonte Springs, Florida, on December 19, 1986, to Shawna Roberts Bentz, who was 18 at the time of Boebert's birth. The identity of her father is not known. Professional wrestler Stan Lane was speculated to be Boebert's father but this was disproven by two DNA tests, once in 1990 and again in 2023. At the age of four, Bentz took her from Florida to Colorado to stay with her boyfriend, only to move back to Florida with a different boyfriend, and then returned to Colorado to the Colorado man who became her stepfather. When she was 12, she and her family moved to the Montbello neighborhood of Denver and later to Aurora, Colorado, before settling in Rifle, Colorado, in 2003. Boebert dropped out of high school during her senior year in 2004 when she had a baby. She earned a GED certificate in 2020, a month before her first election primary.

Boebert has stated that her family depended on welfare when she was growing up and that she was raised in a Democratic household in a liberal area. Records at the Colorado secretary of state's office show that her mother was registered to vote in Colorado as a Republican from 2001 to 2013 and as a Democrat from 2015 to 2020. At age 19, Boebert herself registered to vote in 2006 as a Democrat; in 2008, she changed her affiliation to Republican.

According to Boebert, she became religious while attending a church in Glenwood Springs, and became a born-again Christian in 2009. She has claimed she volunteered at a local jail for seven years, but attendance logs at the Garfield County Sheriff's office show that she volunteered at the jail nine times between May 2014 and November 2016.

== Early career ==
After leaving high school, Boebert took a job as an assistant manager at a McDonald's in Rifle. She later said that this job changed her views about whether government assistance is necessary. After marrying Jayson Boebert in 2007, she got a job filing for a natural gas drilling company and then became a pipeliner, a member of a team that builds and maintains pipelines and pumping stations.

=== Restaurant ownership ===
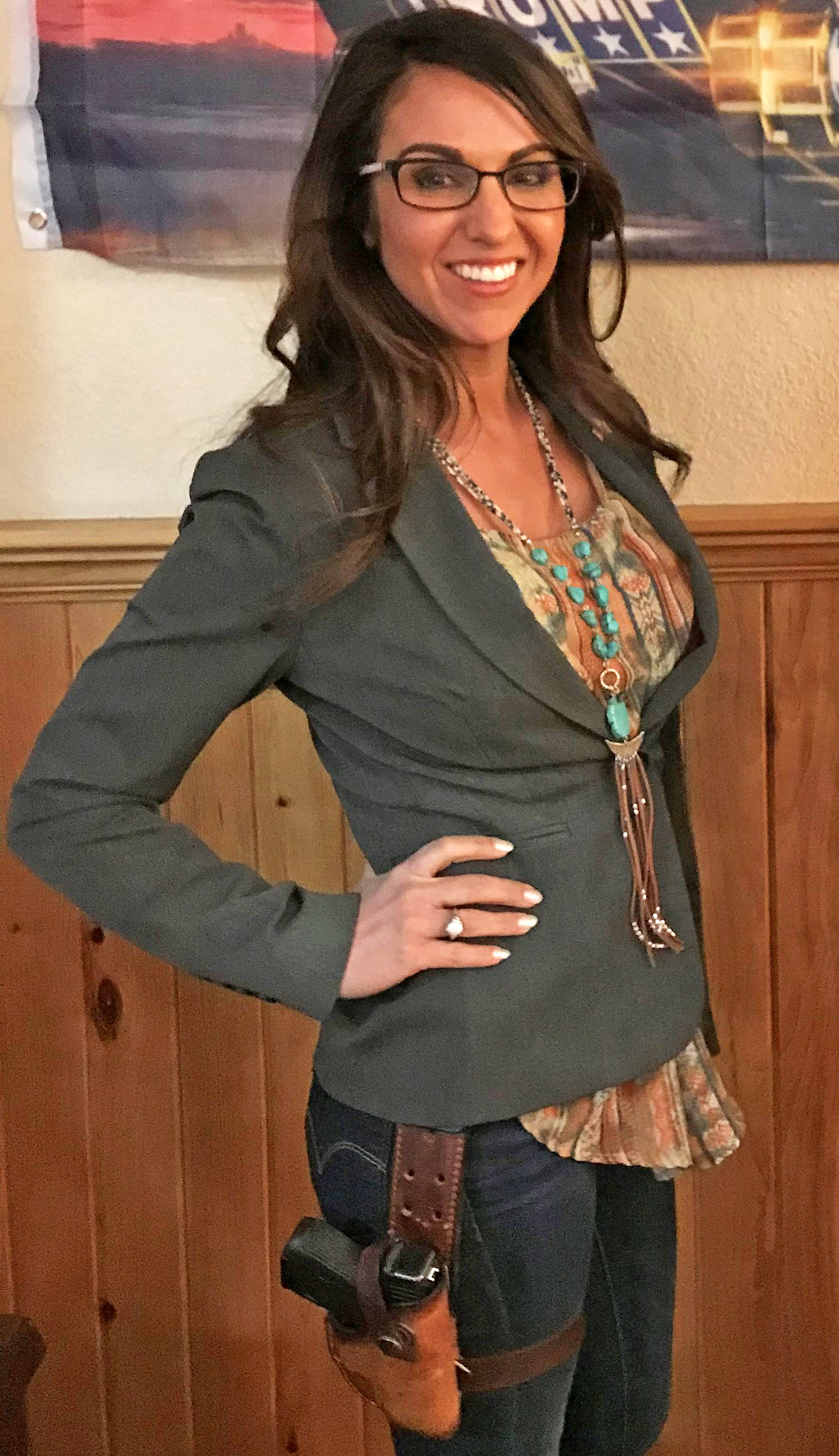
Boebert at Shooters Grill

In 2013, Boebert and her husband opened Shooters Grill in Rifle, west of Glenwood Springs, Colorado. Boebert says she obtained a concealed carry permit after a man was "beaten to death by another man's hands ... outside of [her] restaurant", and began encouraging the restaurant's servers to carry guns openly. That is mostly false: in 2013, a man who had reportedly engaged in a fight blocks away ran to within about a block of Boebert's restaurant, fell, and died from a methamphetamine overdose. The Boeberts also owned a restaurant called Smokehouse 1776, now defunct, across the street from Shooters Grill. In 2015, Boebert opened Putters restaurant on Rifle Creek Golf Course, which she sold in December 2016. Shooters Grill, according to her congressional disclosure forms, lost $143,000 in 2019 and $226,000 in 2020.

In 2017, 80 people who attended a Garfield County fair contracted food poisoning after eating pork sliders from a temporary location set up by Shooters Grill and Smokehouse 1776. The restaurants did not have the required permits to operate at the temporary location, and the Garfield County health department determined that the outbreak was caused by unsafe food handling at the event.

In 2020, Boebert protested orders issued by Colorado governor Jared Polis to close businesses in response to the COVID-19 pandemic. In mid-May 2020, she violated the state's stay-at-home order by reopening Shooters Grill for dine-in service, and received a cease and desist order from Garfield County, with which she refused to comply. The next day, Boebert moved tables outside, onto the sidewalk, and in parking spaces. The following day, Garfield County suspended her food license. By late May, with the state allowing restaurants to reopen at 50% capacity, the county dropped its temporary restraining order.

Shooters Grill closed in July 2022, when the building's new owner opted not to renew the lease.

== U.S. House of Representatives ==
=== Elections ===
==== 2020 ====
===== Primary =====
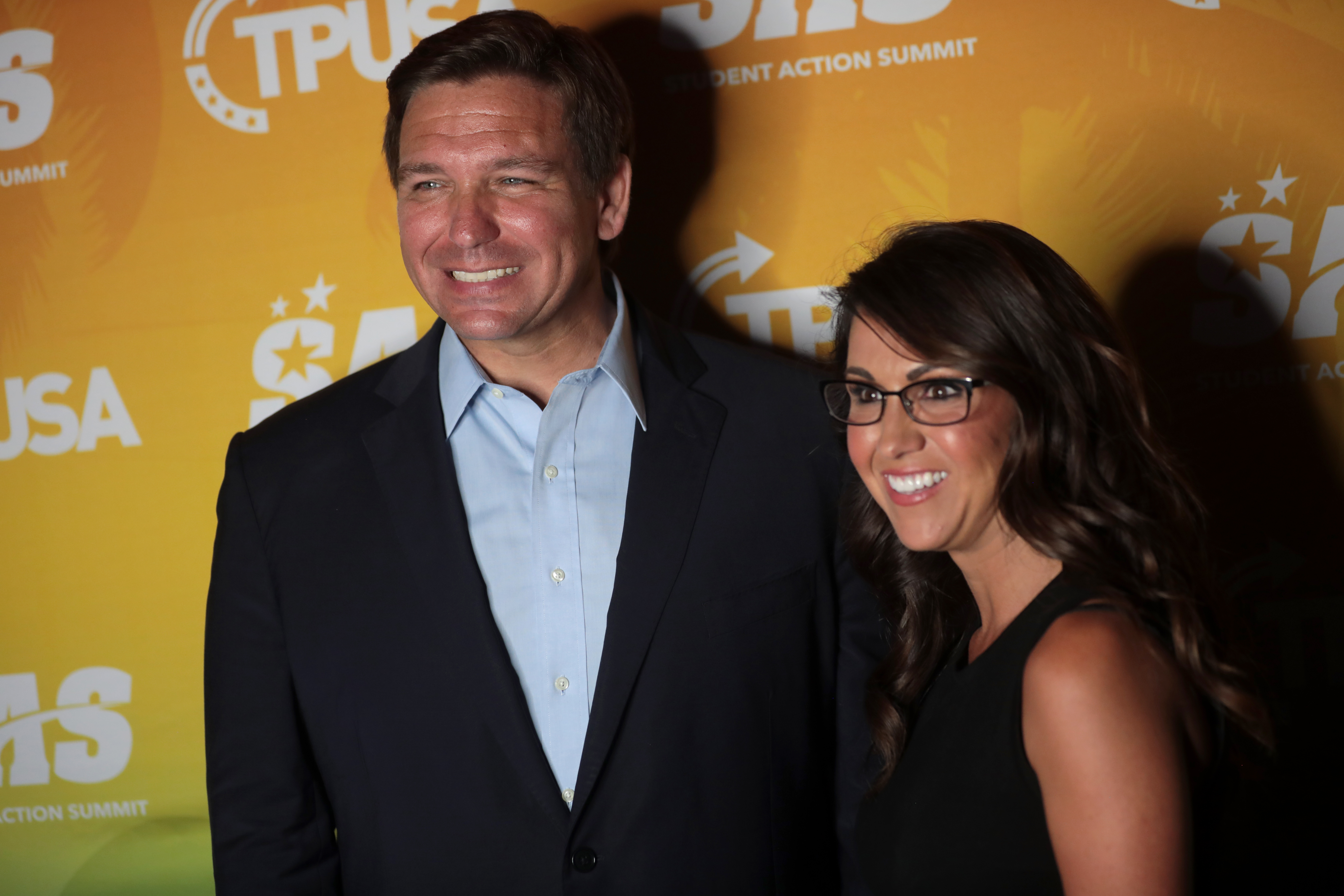
Boebert with Florida Governor Ron DeSantis in 2021

In September 2019, Boebert made national headlines when she confronted Beto O'Rourke, a candidate in the 2020 Democratic presidential primary, at an Aurora town hall meeting over his proposal for a buy-back program and a ban on assault-style rifles like AR-15s. Later that month, she opposed a measure banning guns in city-owned buildings at a meeting of the Aspen City Council. The ordinance passed unanimously a month later.

Boebert was an organizer of the December 2019 "We Will Not Comply!" rally opposing Colorado's red flag law, which allows guns to be taken from people deemed a threat. The American Patriots Three Percent militia, affiliated with the Three Percenters, provided security, and members of the Proud Boys attended the rally. On Twitter, Boebert has used rhetoric friendly to the Three Percenters and posed with members of the group. She deleted the tweet with the photos after being asked about it. During her congressional campaign, she said she was "with the militia".

In December 2019, Boebert launched her campaign to represent Colorado's 3rd congressional district in the United States House of Representatives, beginning with a challenge to five-term incumbent Scott Tipton in the Republican primary. During her campaign, she criticized Alexandria Ocasio-Cortez and other members of "The Squad", positioning herself as a conservative alternative to the progressive representative. Seth Masket, a political science professor at the University of Denver, suggested that Boebert wanted to motivate Republican voters to participate in the primary during a slow election cycle by stirring up their anger at Ocasio-Cortez and others.

Boebert criticized Tipton's voting record, which she said did not reflect his district. Before the primary, Trump endorsed Tipton, but Boebert characterized him as unsupportive of Trump. She accused him of supporting amnesty for undocumented immigrants by voting for H.R. 5038, the Farm Workforce Modernization Act of 2019, saying that the act had a provision that led to citizenship and provided funding for housing for undocumented farm workers. Boebert decried what she said were Tipton's insufficient efforts to continue funding for the Paycheck Protection Program, whose money had run out within two weeks, arguing that more was needed. Boebert raised just over $150,000 through the June 30 primary.

In a May 2020 interview on SteelTruth, a QAnon-supporting web show, Boebert said she was "very familiar with" the conspiracy theory: "Everything I've heard of Q, I hope that this is real because it only means America is getting stronger and better." The Colorado Times Recorder reported that she followed multiple YouTube channels connected with QAnon before deleting her YouTube account when it came under scrutiny. Boebert later said she was not a follower of QAnon, in a statement where she endorsed investigations into "deep state activities that undermine the President".

In September 2019, Boebert aide and future campaign manager Sherronna Bishop published a video on her Facebook page in which she interviewed a self-proclaimed member of the far-right group Proud Boys, which Bishop called "pro-everything that makes America great", adding, "thank God for you guys and the Proud Boys". Bishop left the Boebert campaign shortly after Boebert won the Republican nomination. In October 2020, Boebert's campaign denied any connection to the Proud Boys and said Boebert did not share Bishop's views.

On June 30, 2020, Boebert won the Republican nomination with 54.6% of the vote to Tipton's 45.4%. The result gained national attention and surprised political commentators. CNN and Politico called it a "stunning upset"; The Hill made a similar statement. Tipton conceded defeat on election night and Trump congratulated Boebert in a tweet. Democratic Congressional Campaign Committee chair Cheri Bustos said in a statement that national Republicans should disavow Boebert for supporting QAnon.

Boebert was the first primary challenger to defeat a sitting U.S. representative in Colorado in 48 years, since Democratic Representative Wayne Aspinall lost to Alan Merson. She pledged to join the Freedom Caucus upon taking office.

===== General election =====
Boebert faced Democratic former state representative Diane Mitsch Bush, a retired sociology professor from Steamboat Springs, Colorado, in the November general election. Boebert said that Mitsch Bush's platform was "more government control" and that Mitsch Bush had a "socialist agenda". Boebert emphasized her devotion to Trump and his policies and reiterated her points about deregulation of industries and decreasing healthcare funding, while rallying for the expansion of gun rights.

In late July 2020, Boebert was considered the front-runner. A September survey paid for by Michael Bloomberg's Democratic-leaning House Majority PAC had Mitsch Bush ahead by one percentage point. Mitsch Bush outraised Boebert, with $4.2 million for her and nearly $4 million spent by Democratic operatives, as opposed to Boebert's $2.4 million raised and more than $5 million spent by the Republicans, but Boebert won the election, 51.27% to 45.41%. According to the Atlas of the 2020 Elections, Boebert was able to command strong support in the traditionally conservative areas of the Western Slope of Colorado and the San Luis Valley while retaining enough Republican votes in liberal-leaning Pueblo and other Democratic areas. It also stated that Boebert did not suffer from the Trump effect, as compared to the support of Trump at the polls, with the 3rd district witnessing few split-ticket votes. Her campaign succeeded by appealing to independence and rebellion.

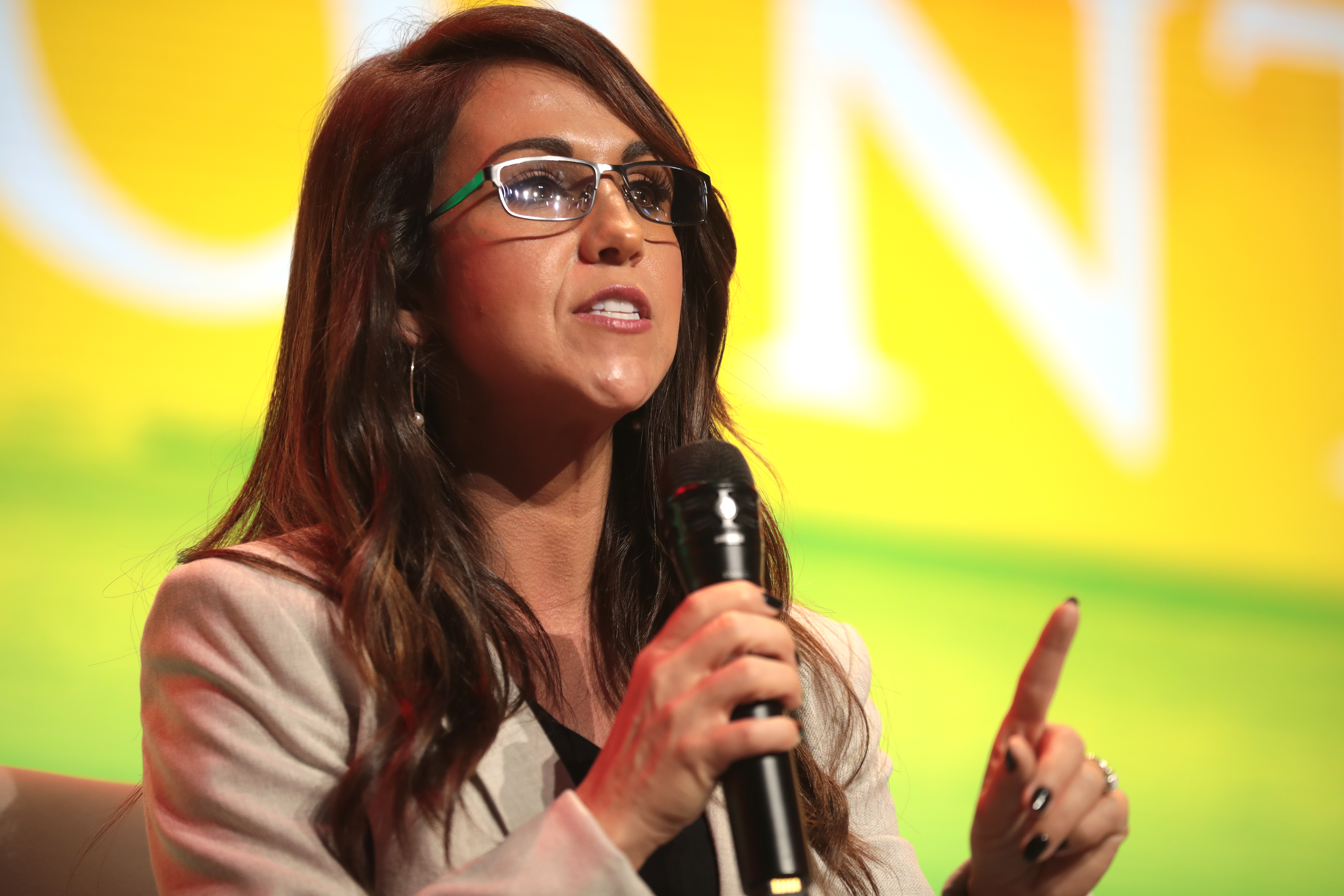
Boebert speaking at Turning Point USA's December 2020 Student Action Summit in Palm Beach, Florida

In 2020, Boebert reimbursed herself $22,259 for mileage costs from her campaign's finances, which legally would require her to have driven 38,712 mi (62,301 km). The Denver Post reported in early February 2021 that three ethics experts said the high figure was suspicious. Boebert's campaign attributed the figure to her "aggressive travel schedule", but members of her campaign did not provide evidence for the amount of travel. CPR News calculated that it was plausible that Boebert had driven 30,000 miles based on her visits to 129 events.

Boebert said in a mid-February interview that she "drove tens of thousands of miles ... I had to make those connections, and really, I underreported a lot of stuff." In late February 2021, Boebert's campaign updated its campaign finance filing, reclassifying $3,053 claimed for mileage to "hotels", and $867 claimed for mileage to Uber rides, thus claiming a mileage of around 30,000 miles.

Despite campaign finance laws and ethics laws requiring Congressional candidates to reveal their immediate family's income sources to show potential conflicts of interest, Boebert did not report her husband's income in her 2020 filing, instead belatedly revealing it in August 2021, the same day the Federal Election Commission (FEC) sent her a letter investigating her campaign expenses. The filing, while misnaming the company involved, stated that her husband, Jayson, was paid $460,000 in 2019 and $478,000 in 2020 as a consultant for Terra Energy, one of Colorado's largest natural gas producers and fourth nationwide in methane emissions. The company told The Daily Beast that Jayson was a contracted shift worker for the company who was not paid directly but through another company, Boebert Consulting. As of 2021, Colorado classified Boebert Consulting as a delinquent company due to the lack of filings or registered agent with the state. Boebert oversees the energy industry via her position on the House Committee on Natural Resources.

==== 2022 ====
===== Use of campaign funds for personal expenses =====
In August 2021, the FEC investigated the apparent use of more than $6,000 from Boebert's 2022 reelection campaign funds for her personal expenses. The funds were used between May and June 2021 via four Venmo payments. Boebert's communications director said that these were indeed personal expenses, "billed to the campaign account in error", and that the "reimbursement has already happened". In September 2021, Boebert submitted documents to the FEC declaring that the campaign money had been used to settle rental and utility bills, and had since been reimbursed.

===== Republican primary =====
Boebert sought a second term representing Colorado's 3rd congressional district in the 2022 election. During the primary, her main challenger was Don Coram, a state senator who positioned himself as more moderate. Boebert aimed to portray him as corrupt, in particular by alleging that he used his powers as a state legislator to pass laws legalizing hemp, which Coram grows (state voters approved the amendment legalizing marijuana in 2012), and as not Republican enough. A Democratic-aligned Super PAC made false claims and unproven allegations about Boebert. Boebert's attorney said in June that she would file a defamation lawsuit against the group, but she has not done so. The temporary restraining order she obtained on June 23 against David Wheeler, one of its co-founders, was vacated in July and the case dismissed.

Boebert's campaign had a significant advantage, with $5 million in campaign funds to Coram's $225,000; Coram also started campaigning late in the primary, and Trump endorsed Boebert. During the pre-primary debate on May 26, Boebert emphasized the bills she had introduced in Congress while questioning Coram's legislative votes. She also repeated claims of massive election fraud and invoked her opposition to the restrictions introduced as a result of the spread of what she called the "Fauci-funded China virus" (SARS-CoV-2).

Boebert supporters failed to throw Coram off the ballot for allegedly not having collected enough signatures. Several thousand Democrats tried to influence the election by renouncing their membership in the party and voting as independents for more moderate Republicans, which is allowed in the state. Boebert won the primary with almost 66% of the vote.

===== General election =====
In a debate with Democratic nominee Adam Frisch on September 11, 2022, Boebert took credit for bills she had voted against, did not cross-examine Frisch, proposed more oil and gas development to respond to climate change, and continuously attacked House speaker Nancy Pelosi. Boebert defeated Frisch by a small margin in a closer than expected race. The margin was so close it triggered an automatic recount. The recount was completed on December 12 and affirmed that Boebert won by 546 votes out of 327,000.

==== 2024 ====
Boebert filed her statement of candidacy with the Federal Election Commission (FEC) on January 13, 2023. After narrowly winning reelection in 2022, she attempted to rebrand her image with the voters in her district from a MAGA firebrand to a hard-working congresswoman. In 2023, she blamed her narrow 2022 victory on 'ballot harvesting', described by NBC as a Republican term for the third-party collection of absentee ballots, while her press releases focused on local issues, including a "$5 million grant for a rural health center in a spending package she voted against".

Boebert announced on December 27, 2023, that she would switch to running in Colorado's 4th congressional district in the eastern part of the state, which is considered to be Colorado's safest district for Republicans. Within a week, Boebert stated that the reason for the change in district was "Hollywood elites" such as Barbra Streisand and "Ryan Reynolds coming in and donating to the Democrat" in the 3rd congressional district. Boebert has been criticized as a "carpetbagger" for switching to a more Republican leaning district. Boebert won 54% to 42%.

==== 2026 ====
Boebert began her 2026 reelection campaign in October 2025. She lost the election with 47.9% of the votes to Eileen Laubacher's 48.8%.

=== Tenure ===
Observers describe Boebert as far-right; she rejects the label.

As of January 29, 2022, Boebert had introduced 17 bills and seven resolutions, none of which passed committee.

In August 2022, The Colorado Sun reported that Boebert had violated the Stop Trading on Congressional Knowledge (STOCK) Act of 2012, a federal transparency and conflict-of-interest law, by failing to properly disclose sales of stocks, cryptocurrency, and brokerage funds belonging to her husband worth between $5,000 and $80,000.

In January 2023, at the beginning of the 118th Congress, she was one of 20 far-right Republican members who prevented the election of Kevin McCarthy to the House speakership on the first 14 ballots.

In February 2023, Boebert co-sponsored a bill to designate the "AR-15-style rifle" the National Gun of the United States.

During the 2023 United States debt-ceiling crisis, Boebert was a vocal opponent of the Fiscal Responsibility Act of 2023 and vowed to vote "nay" on the bill, which passed in the House 314–117. She missed the vote and said on the record that she had been "unavoidably detained". Two days later, Boebert tweeted that she had missed the vote as a "no-show protest" but CNN had recorded video of her running up the steps to the House and being told that the vote had been closed.

Boebert has blocked critics on her personal Twitter account. A blocked constituent sued her for access, but the case was dismissed with prejudice in October 2022.

==== Efforts to impeach President Biden ====
Boebert twice attempted to impeach President Joe Biden. In September 2021, she submitted a resolution to impeach him and another to impeach Vice President Kamala Harris over the withdrawal of United States troops from Afghanistan.

Boebert made another attempt in June 2023, when she filed a privileged resolution to bypass House leadership and bring impeachment articles against Biden for his immigration and border protection policies to the floor for a vote. The House voted instead to refer the matter to the Homeland Security and Judiciary committees.

==== Leak of Hillary Clinton testimony photo ====
On February 26, 2026, Boebert leaked a photo of Hillary Clinton during Clinton's testimony deposition concerning Jeffrey Epstein to conservative podcaster Benny Johnson, who then posted the photo on social media. Boebert's leak of the photo was in violation of ethics protocol rules set up by the House Oversight and Government Reform Committee, with such content being vulnerable to editing with the intent of creating political theatrics, and would result in Clinton's testimony being put on hold briefly.

==== Allegation of violation of House code of conduct ====
On September 17, 2026, David B. Wheeler of American Muckrakers filed a complaint with the United States House Committee on Ethics which alleged that Boebert had sexual, and romantic, relationships with three senior staff members, district director Clarice Navarro, district chief of staff Raven Finegan, and chief of staff Jeffrey Small, and that she paid them hush money, violating the House of Representatives code of conduct. On social media, she denied the allegations, describing them as "false", "senseless", and "sensational". She also told one publication, "I'm not a lesbian or bisexual, and I have never, ever been in any inappropriate relationship, nor have I ever been sexually involved with any staff", while Navarro denied the allegations involving her as "false, defamatory, and beyond ridiculous". The Advocate later noted that Boebert never "directly addresses the allegations of relationships" in her social media post on the topic.

=== Committee assignments ===
For the 119th Congress:

- Committee on Natural Resources
  - Subcommittee on Oversight and Investigations (Vice Chair)
  - Subcommittee on Water, Wildlife and Fisheries
- Committee on Oversight and Government Reform
  - Subcommittee on Cybersecurity, Information Technology, and Government Innovation
  - Subcommittee on Economic Growth, Energy Policy, and Regulatory Affairs
  - Subcommittee on Federal Law Enforcement

=== Caucus memberships ===
Boebert is a member of the following Congressional caucuses:

- Congressional Blockchain Caucus
- Congressional Western Caucus
- Freedom Caucus
- Republican Study Committee
- Second Amendment Caucus

== Political positions ==
=== Abortion ===
Boebert opposes comprehensive sex education, abortion, and federal funding of Planned Parenthood. In 2024, Boebert expressed her support for federal anti-abortion legislation, stating she supported federal law protecting life from conception.

=== Certification of 2020 presidential election and Capitol attack ===
On January 5, 2021, the day before the storming of the United States Capitol, Boebert urged people to "remember these next 48 hours", saying they would be among the most important in American history. The next day, in the hours before the Capitol was attacked, she described the day's events as Republicans' "1776 moment", a reference to the American Revolutionary War. Boebert then told Speaker Nancy Pelosi that her constituents were outside the Capitol and that she had promised to represent their voices in the chamber. During a town hall in March, Boebert appeared to defend the January 6 attackers on the Capitol, saying, "We already see in Washington, D.C. You can't petition your government. You're an insurrectionist if you do that!", later claiming that the remarks were made "in reference to the ongoing security measures in place around the Capitol complex".

During the counting of the Electoral College votes before the attack, Boebert objected to accepting Arizona's votes in a speech to the joint session of Congress. She accused Arizona of "unlawfully amending its voter registration laws by extending the registration periods", alleging widespread voter fraud, which echoed the false claims aired by Donald Trump, and accusing everyone who intended to accept the "results of this concentrated, coordinated, partisan effort by Democrats" of having allied themselves with the extremist left.

In December 2021, Boebert doubled down on these allegations, saying that hundreds of thousands of ballots were illegally mailed to voters, without providing evidence. When the vote count resumed after the rioters had been removed from the Capitol, the challenges to Arizona's and Pennsylvania's electoral votes proceeded to a vote while those against several other states were dropped. Boebert voted against the certification of both states' electoral votes.

Democratic politicians in Colorado and the Aurora Sentinel Colorado accused Boebert of helping to incite violence at the U.S. Capitol and called on her to resign. While the Capitol was being stormed, Boebert posted information on Twitter about the proceedings of the certification, including that the House chamber had been locked down and that Pelosi had been evacuated. She was accused of endangering members' safety and faced calls to resign, but refused, defending her actions because Pelosi's evacuation was also publicly broadcast live on TV; academic Zac Parker opined that it was still a potential security threat since C-SPAN did not focus on Pelosi, and had it not been for Boebert's tweet, the protesters might have not noticed it. Boebert's communications director resigned on January 16 in response to her behavior on January 6.

In June 2021, Boebert was one of 21 House Republicans to vote against a resolution to give the Congressional Gold Medal to police officers who defended the U.S. Capitol. She later explained that she objected to giving an award to Billy Evans, who was included in the resolution and who died during an unrelated Capitol attack in April that year. Boebert additionally rejects the term "insurrection" for the January 6 events and has called the House inquiry into the attack a "sham witch hunt". She has equated the behavior of some of the rioters who participated in the Black Lives Matter (BLM) protests following the murder of George Floyd to those who attacked the Capitol. She alleged in a letter to U.S. Attorney General Merrick Garland that he was being too lenient toward those who were arrested during the 2020 BLM riots, as compared to the Capitol rioters. (Note: Court records disprove these allegations and courts have generally rejected these comparisons.) She also entered a resolution seeking to recognize antifa as a domestic terrorist organization and said BLM would "burn down cities and destroy businesses".

Boebert opposes the National Popular Vote Interstate Compact, which would elect the president by popular vote.

=== COVID-19 policies ===
Boebert opposes mitigation policies seeking to reduce COVID-19's spread. She has called the vaccine mandates unconstitutional and in particular, opposed them for the military. She compared the federal government's COVID-19 vaccination efforts to "Biden [deploying] his Needle Nazis", and accused Anthony Fauci, who told people to overcome their political opposition and get the COVID-19 vaccine, of bullying. Boebert also alleged that there was a deliberate effort to introduce immigrants who would substitute the unvaccinated people. In June 2021, Boebert advised her constituents in Mesa County, who were experiencing an uptick of Delta variant cases at the time, that the "easiest way to make the Delta variant go away is to turn off CNN [and] vote Republican", but has since deleted the tweet amid public criticism. She has also compared the virus to communism.

Boebert is a vocal opponent of mandatory face-mask wearing and argues that masks should be optional. She falsely claimed that, during the two months that followed the end of the Texas mask mandate, the state did not record any COVID-19-related deaths. She introduced a bill that would ban all mask mandates on federal property and during travel in interstate commerce, attracting no support. Boebert was one of the people who voiced support for the Freedom Convoy 2022, a Canadian trucker protest seeking to repeal all COVID-19 vaccination mandates and COVID-19 restrictions. Boebert received a $500 fine for violating the mask mandate on Congress's premises.

In late February 2021, Boebert and a dozen other Republican House members skipped votes and enlisted others to vote for them, citing the ongoing COVID-19 pandemic, while actually attending the Conservative Political Action Conference, which was held at the same time as their absences. In response, the Campaign for Accountability, an ethics watchdog group, filed a complaint with the House Committee on Ethics and requested an investigation into Boebert and the other lawmakers.

=== Economy ===
During her 2020 campaign, Boebert pledged that she would not support any federal budget that resulted in additional debt and that she would support a balanced budget amendment to the U.S. Constitution. She opposes any tax increases. While expressing support for more defense expenditure, Boebert was one of 75 House Republicans to vote against the National Defense Authorization Act of 2022, saying the bill had a "woke agenda".

In May 2022, Boebert was one of nine House members who voted against two bills to alleviate the 2022 shortage of baby formula caused by bacterial contamination. One of the bills, the Access to Baby Formula Act, makes it easier for low-income families to continue buying formula with vouchers; the other allows the government to invoke the Defense Production Act to speed up production. Boebert said she voted against the bills because "the Biden administration and Democrats created the issue."

=== Education ===
Boebert supports eliminating the U.S. Department of Education. She has said that one of her top legislative priorities is to eliminate critical race theory from schools, even though it is not part of the K-12 Colorado Academic Standards. During a press conference, she asserted that it was a lie, that it was racist, and that it would lead to children hating each other. Boebert opposes sex education in schools. Boebert supported Louisiana's order to display the Ten Commandments in public schools, as she commented in June 2024: "This is something we need all throughout our nation … because we need morals back in our nation."

=== Environment ===
Boebert has supported the energy industry. During her campaign, she said she supported "all-of-the-above energy, but the markets decide ... not the government". She declared support for uranium extraction and the generation of nuclear power, touting it as the "cleanest form of energy". In February 2021, Boebert proposed a bill to ban executive moratoriums on oil and gas leases and permits on some federal lands. She also proposed amendments to the Build Back Better Act that would abolish methane-emission payments by fracking companies and others that would increase royalties for oil and gas extraction on federal lands and abolish fines and financial requirements for cleaning abandoned drilling infrastructure.

Boebert opposes sustainable energy initiatives because she considers green energy unreliable and believes that decreasing the extraction of fossil fuels in her district will "regulate our communities into poverty". She opposes the Green New Deal, claiming it would cost $93 trillion to implement and would bankrupt the country. (Note: The methodology by which the American Action Forum, a conservative think tank, came to the figure (the study cited a range of $51–93 trillion) is disputed by FactCheck.org.) Boebert also opposes the participation of the United States in the Paris Agreement, calling it "job-killing", and introduced a bill the day after Biden's inauguration seeking to block re-entrance of the country to the agreement by forcing its ratification in the Senate by a two-thirds supermajority and prohibiting the use of federal funds for reaching the agreement's goals.

Boebert believes that attempts at decarbonization should be made via forest management. She has introduced a forest management bill, the Active Forest Management, Wildfire Prevention and Community Protection Act, which would attempt to prevent wildfires through several mitigation measures, such as removing trees killed by bark beetles, making it harder for groups to go to court to stop forest thinning, and requiring the United States Forest Service to harvest six billion board foot (14 million cubic meters) of lumber annually. Boebert has proposed legislation in the House anchoring the Bureau of Land Management's headquarters in Grand Junction, Colorado, which is in the 3rd district.

=== Fentanyl ===
In June 2022, Boebert introduced a bill to classify the opioid fentanyl as a weapon of mass destruction. A Congressional Research Service report released in March stated that "formally designating fentanyl as [a weapon of mass destruction] may not be necessary for additional executive branch action" but that Congress could consider legislation to "address 'perceived shortcomings'."

=== Firearms ===
Boebert is a strong advocate of gun rights. During her primary campaign, she voiced opposition to Colorado's recently enacted red flag law. On January 1, 2021, in a letter co-signed by more than 80 Republicans, Boebert asked Speaker Pelosi and House minority leader Kevin McCarthy to uphold the 1967 law exempting members of Congress from a Capitol Hill ban on firearms, which allowed them to keep arms in their offices.

After saying that she planned to carry a gun while working on Capitol Hill, Boebert published a viral video advertisement showing her placing a handgun in a hip holster and walking through the neighborhood, near federal buildings and through alleys. Her spokesman later said that she had not been carrying a gun during the walk. The video was made by the same consulting firm that produced the viral August 2020 campaign video for House candidate Kimberly Klacik.

During the January 6 United States Capitol attack, Boebert was in the House chamber having just given an impassioned speech in support of the protesters outside the building. Her gun was stored in her office when rioters breached outer security and legislators were locked down as the building was looted and violent confrontations occurred with guards.

On January 12, metal detectors were installed around the House chamber to screen everyone, including legislators, on the orders of Speaker of the House Nancy Pelosi. That evening, Boebert refused a bag search after she set off the metal detectors, but was eventually allowed to enter the chamber without a bag search. She did the same on January 13, refusing to stop for a wand check after she set off the metal detector. Boebert called the metal detectors "just another political stunt by Speaker Pelosi".

A January 2021 New York Times profile of Boebert characterized her actions as "a made-for-Twitter moment that delighted the far right." The article said that although she had only been in Congress for a few days, she had "already arranged several episodes that showcased her brand of far-right defiance as a conspiracy theorist" and that she "represents an incoming faction of the party for whom breaking the rules—and gaining notoriety for doing it—is exactly the point." Democrats, fearing the guns might do harm while in Congress chambers and partly in response to Boebert's conspicuous carry of a firearm (as well as an actual attempt by Representative Andy Harris to bring a gun into the chamber and an apparent endorsement by Marjorie Taylor Greene of the assassination of certain Democrats), proposed legislation to end the "honor system" and ban guns from Capitol grounds altogether. The law was never adopted. On February 3, the Democratic House majority instituted a $5,000 fine ($10,000 on second offense) for refusal to comply with security measures under its Article 1, Section 5 authority. When a Republican majority took control of the House of Representatives on January 3, 2023, they removed the metal detectors.

In February 2021, Boebert objected to firearms restrictions for meetings of the House Natural Resources Committee.

In February 2023, after the Bureau of Alcohol, Tobacco, Firearms and Explosives mandated that gun owners register any firearms that use "stabilizing braces", Boebert said the mandate violated the separation of powers. She added: "Alcohol, tobacco and firearms. In western Colorado, we call that a fun weekend. But D.C. bureaucrats have used this agency to infringe on the rights of the American people."

=== Foreign policy ===
Boebert was one of 14 House Republicans, most of them members of the Freedom Caucus, to vote against a measure condemning the Myanmar coup d'état that passed overwhelmingly. She cited concern about a passage that urged social media platforms to prevent disinformation and violence, which she said was tantamount to making Big Tech the "arbiter of truth".

Boebert was one of 49 House Republicans to vote to repeal the authorization of military force against Iraq. She also voted against the bipartisan ALLIES Act, which would increase by 8,000 the number of special immigrant visas for Afghan allies of the U.S. military during its invasion of Afghanistan while also reducing some application requirements that caused long application backlogs; the bill passed the House, 407–16. In August 2021, after the Afghan government fell to the Taliban, Boebert tweeted, "the Taliban are the only people building back better", reusing Biden's "Build Back Better" campaign slogan. She opposes U.S. intervention in the Russian invasion of Ukraine.

Boebert supports the construction of a Mexico–U.S. border wall and opposes amnesty for undocumented immigrants living in the US; she introduced two bills to that effect: one that would codify Trump's immigration policies into law and one that would annul executive orders and internal policies that enable or assist asylum and immigration procedures. Boebert said she intended to introduce a bill that would end financing of legal aid for immigrants. She criticized what she called Biden's failure to contain "a complete invasion at our southern border" and Democrats' preference for open borders that she said had enabled the Democratic electoral takeover of California.

Boebert has urged for even closer relations between Israel and the United States, saying that their foundings were divinely inspired and that they are the "two nations [in the world] that have been created to glorify God".

In 2023, Boebert was among 47 Republicans to vote in favor of H.Con.Res. 21, which directed President Joe Biden to remove U.S. troops from Syria within 180 days.

In 2025, Boebert penned a measure banning companies engaged in "politically motivated" boycotts of Israel from Pentagon contracts.

In an October 2026 debate, Boebert said she did not want the United States to start the 2026 Iran war and wanted the conflict to end, despite having voted against several War Powers Resolutions that could have done so.

=== Government surveillance ===
In April 2026, Boebert and Thomas Massie co-introduced the Surveillance Accountability Act, which seeks to establish stricter legal thresholds for government surveillance by requiring warrants for certain searches and restricting the warrantless use of facial recognition systems and automated license plate readers. Boebert has criticized current federal surveillance practices as a violation of Fourth Amendment rights, specifically citing concerns over the government's ability to scan public spaces and compile databases on private citizens.

In 2026, Boebert publicly opposed an extension of the Foreign Intelligence Surveillance Act (FISA) Section 702 unless the legislation includes a warrant requirement when accessing the communications of U.S. citizens. Her position broke with Donald Trump and most other congressional Republicans, who supported the renewal on national security grounds.

=== Health care ===
During her primary campaign, Boebert argued for the repeal of the Affordable Care Act, also known as Obamacare, and opposed the introduction of a single-payer healthcare system, saying it would harm small businesses like hers because of the prohibitive cost. After the election, she said she was undecided about whether it was best to keep or repeal Obamacare, but wished that a more market-based system would be adopted. She voted in 2026 against extending the Affordable Care Act enhanced tax credits. During her tenure in Congress, she was one of two representatives (the other was Marjorie Taylor Greene) to vote against the TRANSPLANT Act, which reauthorized the National Marrow Donor Program through 2026, citing concern over the addition of the program to the national debt as it had not received a Congressional Budget Office evaluation.

=== Immigration ===
Boebert sponsored H.R. 6202, the American Tech Workforce Act of 2021, introduced by Representative Jim Banks. The legislation would establish a wage floor for the high-skill H-1B visa program, thereby significantly reducing employer dependence on the program. The bill would also eliminate the Optional Practical Training program that allows foreign graduates to stay and work in the United States. In March 2024, Boebert proposed the "Build the Wall and Deport Them All Act", which sought to reinstate several Trump administration immigration policies and advance the removal of undocumented immigrants. During her 2024 campaign, she also stated her support for Trump's proposal to increase deportations, including the potential use of the National Guard and military to remove undocumented immigrants.

=== LGBT rights ===
Boebert opposes the Equality Act, saying it promotes "supremacy of gays" and says transgender women take scholarships and sports opportunities away from cis women. She opposes same-sex marriage, writing on her campaign website that she opposes "efforts to redefine marriage as anything other than the union of one man and one woman". She introduced a bill to ban federal funding of research and publications into transgender health care for minors, asserting that they are being "sexualized and used for horrific sexual 'research'" when being administered puberty blockers.

In 2022, she cosponsored two bills widely seen as anti-LGBT legislation. The first, introduced by Marjorie Taylor Greene, would criminalize providing sex reassignment surgery and other forms of transgender health care to minors; the second was the Stop the Sexualization of Children Act, introduced by Mike Johnson, which would prohibit federally funded institutions from promoting or instructing on LGBT issues or sexual orientation and is widely seen as a national version of Florida Parental Rights in Education Act.

In 2025, Boebert was accused of harassing a cisgender woman in the women's bathroom at the Capitol by trying to get her removed, making erroneous accusations and assumptions that the woman was transgender Congress member Sarah McBride.

=== QAnon and other conspiracies ===
Boebert has embraced the QAnon conspiracy theory. During a March 15, 2021, town hall in Montrose, Colorado, advertised only to local Republicans who were asked to not disclose it publicly, she was asked when Hillary Clinton and other former officials would be arrested, a recurring theme of QAnon. She responded that she knew someone involved with documents declassified by Trump during the closing days of his presidency and that the documents would reveal corruption that would trigger resignations that would allow Republicans to retake the House and Senate before 2022, echoing a theory promoted by The Epoch Times. Boebert urged people to dismiss comments about the outlet's unreliability and said the information came from "very good sources".

Boebert has also voiced support for the Clinton body count conspiracy theory. After the June 2021 death of Christopher Sign, the reporter who broke the news of a 2016 meeting on the Phoenix Sky Harbor tarmac between former president Bill Clinton and then-attorney general Loretta Lynch, Boebert tweeted: "Why is it that so many who cross the Clinton Crime Syndicate end up dead?"

=== Religion ===
In September 2021, Boebert told attendees at a Republican fundraiser that she and an aide were joined by Democratic representative Ilhan Omar on a Capitol elevator and that Boebert then said to her aide, "it's the Jihad Squad ... She doesn't have a backpack, she wasn't dropping it and running so we're good". Also that month, Boebert called Omar "a full-time propagandist for Hamas" and an "honorary member of Hamas". During a November 18, 2021, speech on the House floor, Boebert called Omar "the Jihad Squad member from Minnesota". At a November 20 event, she repeated the elevator story, this time including a Capitol Police officer with "fret all over his face".

Omar responded that the story was invented and that "Anti-Muslim bigotry isn't funny and shouldn't be normalized". Boebert later apologized "to anyone in the Muslim community I offended with my comment about Representative Omar". After Boebert and Omar spoke by phone, both said the call went badly, with Boebert saying that she would put "America first, never sympathizing with terrorists. Unfortunately, Ilhan can't say the same thing." The Denver Post apologized on Boebert's behalf for her remarks, saying that it was embarrassing that a Colorado representative engaged in such behavior.

In January 2022, Boebert confronted a group of Orthodox Jews visiting the Capitol and asked them whether they were on a reconnaissance mission, which left them confused. She later said the remark was made in jest.

=== Separation of church and state ===
"Separation of church and state junk"

The church is supposed to direct the government. The government is not supposed to direct the church. I'm tired of this separation of church and state junk. It was not in the Constitution, it was in a stinking letter and it means nothing like what they say it does.

— Lauren Boebert, June 26, 2022
"Congress shall make no law
respecting an establishment of religion
or prohibiting the free exercise thereof."
—First Amendment to the United States Constitution

Boebert promotes the ideals of Christian nationalism. In June 2022, she told a church audience that the church is supposed to direct the government, and that the separation of church and state is not in the Constitution. Boebert's office asserted she was not expressing support of Christian theocracy. Experts said her statement is contrary to the Constitution's First Amendment Establishment Clause, which states that "Congress shall make no law respecting an establishment of religion".

In late 2022, Boebert told two audiences, "we are in the last of the last days", and that they would have a role in "ushering in the second coming of Jesus".

== Personal life ==
Boebert lived with her husband, Jayson Boebert, in Silt, Colorado. They have four sons and one grandson. She said her mother "inspired me to be a mother when I was 18 years old". Jayson worked in the oil and gas industry prior to opening their restaurant, Shooters Grill, and remained in the industry afterward.

Jayson registered the company Boebert Consulting LLC in 2012 and "provided drilling services as an on-site drilling foreman" to Terra Energy since 2017. In her 2021 filing with the House of Representatives, Boebert reported her husband's income as a consultant for Terra Energy at $460,000 in 2019 and $478,000 in 2020.

On May 11, 2023, Boebert filed for divorce from her husband, citing "irreconcilable differences". The divorce was finalized on October 10, 2023.

On April 3, 2024, Boebert was hospitalized after experiencing severe swelling in her left leg. A CT scan showed a blood clot, which was successfully removed in a surgery. She was also diagnosed with May–Thurner syndrome.

=== Theater incident ===
On September 10, 2023, Boebert and a male companion were removed by security staff from a performance of the musical Beetlejuice in a theater in Denver, Colorado, after she and her companion caused a disturbance by vaping, singing, recording the performance, and groping each other. Boebert initially denied having vaped as well as causing a disturbance, writing on social media that she pleaded "guilty to laughing and singing too loud!" After surveillance video footage of the incident was released, she apologized for "[falling] short of her values" and vaping. She said that "she had previously denied it only because she 'did not recall' having done so". The video also showed Boebert's companion fondling her breasts and Boebert caressing his genitalia while they were in their seats. Months later, Boebert described the incident as a "very private moment" that the media had broadcast.

== Legal issues ==
In 2015, Boebert was detained at a music festival for shouting at a group of people arrested for underage drinking, yelling that the arrest was unconstitutional because they had not received Miranda warnings. Deputies reported she "encouraged people arrested for underage drinking to break free and repeatedly said she had 'friends at Fox News' who would report on her subsequent 'illegal arrest'". She was cited for misdemeanor disorderly conduct and twice failed to appear in court on the charge. The charge was later dismissed because the Mesa County district attorney's office believed there was no reasonable likelihood of conviction if the case went to trial.

In 2016, Boebert was cited for careless driving and operating an unsafe vehicle. On February 13, 2017, she was arrested and booked in Garfield County Jail for failure to appear in court on these charges. She pleaded guilty to the unsafe vehicle charge, and the careless driving and failure to appear charges were dismissed.

== Electoral history ==
=== 2020 election cycle ===
2020 Colorado's 3rd congressional district Republican primary
Party	Candidate	Votes	%
Republican	Lauren Boebert	58,678	54.59
Republican	Scott Tipton (incumbent)	48,805	45.41
Total votes		107,483	100.0

2020 Colorado's 3rd congressional district
Party	Candidate	Votes	%
Republican	Lauren Boebert	215,279	51.27
Democratic	Diane Mitsch Bush	190,695	45.41
Libertarian	John Keil	9,841	2.34
Unity	Critter Milton	4,104	0.98
Total votes		419,919	100.0

=== 2022 election cycle ===
2022 Colorado's 3rd congressional district Republican primary
Party	Candidate	Votes	%
Republican	Lauren Boebert (incumbent)	86,325	65.99
Republican	Don Coram	44,482	34.01
Total votes		130,807	100.00

2022 Colorado's 3rd congressional district
Party	Candidate	Votes	%
Republican	Lauren Boebert (incumbent)	163,832	50.08
Democratic	Adam Frisch	163,278	49.92
Total votes		327,110	100.00

=== 2024 election cycle ===
2024 Colorado's 4th congressional district Republican Primary
Party	Candidate	Votes	%
Republican	Lauren Boebert	54,605	43.66
Republican	Jerry Sonnenberg	17,791	14.23
Republican	Deborah Flora	17,069	13.65
Republican	Richard Holtorf	13,387	10.70
Republican	Michael Lynch	13,357	10.68
Republican	Peter Yu	8,854	7.08
Total votes		125,063	100.00

2024 Colorado's 4th congressional district
Party	Candidate	Votes	%
Republican	Lauren Boebert	240,213	53.64
Democratic	Trisha Calvarese	188,249	42.04
Libertarian	Hannah Goodman	11,676	2.61
Approval Voting	Frank Atwood	6,233	1.39
Unity	Paul Fiorino	1,436	0.32
Total votes		447,807	100.00

== Notes ==
U.S. House of Representatives
Preceded by Scott Tipton	Member of the U.S. House of Representatives from Colorado's 3rd congressional district 2021–2025	Succeeded by Jeff Hurd
Preceded by Greg Lopez	Member of the U.S. House of Representatives from Colorado's 4th congressional district 2025–present	Incumbent
U.S. order of precedence (ceremonial)
Preceded by Stephanie Bice	United States representatives by seniority 243rd	Succeeded by Kat Cammack
