= Art Goodtimes =

American poet, farmer and politician

Art Goodtimes is an American poet, farmer and politician in Colorado. Goodtimes was first elected to the San Miguel County Board of Commissioners in 1996 as a Democrat. He switched to the Green Party of Colorado in 1998 and was re-elected in 2000, 2004, 2008 and 2012, before retiring in 2016. He is a noted poet and writer of several books and the poet laureate of the Telluride Mushroom Festival. He grew up in California and graduated from San Francisco State University in 1970. He has also served as co-chair of the Green Party of Colorado.

== Published Works ==
- Dancing on Edge: The McRedeye Poems (2019, Lithic Press) ISBN 978-1946583147
- Looking South to Lone Cone: The Cloud Acre Poems (2013, Western Eye Press) ISBN 978-0941283373
- As If The World Really Mattered (2007, La Alameda Press) ISBN 978-1888809497
- Altar of the Ordinary co-authored by Judyth Hill (1993, Yoo Hoo Press)
- Mushroom Cloud Redeye: A Rant (1990, Western Eye Press)
- Embracing the Earth (1984, Homeward Press)

== Anthologies and Edited Collections ==
- Wildeor: The Wild Life and Living Legacy of Dave Foreman (2023, Essex Editions) ISBN 978-1733519045
- Kinship: Belonging in a World of Relations: Vol. 1 (2021, Center for Humans and Nature Press) ISBN 978-1736862506
- MycoEpithalamia: Mushroom Wedding Poems (2016, Fungi Press) ISBN 978-0692756270
- The Geography of Hope: Poets of Colorado's Western Slope (1998, Conundrum Press) ISBN 978-0965715911
- Earth First! Campfire Poems (1998, Feral Press)
- Beloved of the Sky: Essays and Photographs on Clearcutting (1993, Broken Moon Press) ISBN 978-0913089385
- Wingbone: Poetry from Colorado (1986, Sudden Jungle Press) ISBN 978-0937567036
