= Andy Kerr (American politician) =

American politician

Member of the Jefferson County Commission from the 2nd district
- Incumbent
- Assumed office 2021
- Preceded by: Casey Tighe

Member of the Colorado Senate from the 22nd district
- In office January 9, 2013 – January 4, 2019
- Preceded by: Tim Neville
- Succeeded by: Brittany Pettersen

Member of the Colorado House of Representatives from the 26th district
- In office March 10, 2006 – January 9, 2013
- Preceded by: Betty Boyd
- Succeeded by: Diane Mitsch Bush

Personal details
- Born: October 21, 1968 (age 58)
- Party: Democratic
- Spouse: Tammy
- Education: University of Colorado Denver (BA) (MS)

Andrew Steven Kerr (born October 21, 1968) is an American teacher and politician who serves on the county commission in Jefferson County, Colorado. Prior to his tenure on the county commission he served in the Colorado House of Representatives from the 26th district from 2006 to 2013, and in the Colorado Senate from the 22nd district from 2013 to 2019, as a member of the Democratic Party.

Kerr moved to Lakewood, Colorado, when he was eight and was educated at Green Mountain High School and the University of Colorado Denver. He was appointed to the state house to replace Betty Boyd and was reelected in the 2006, 2008, and 2010 elections. During his tenure in the state house he served as the Majority Whip and Assistant Majority Leader. He chose to run for a seat in the state senate after redistricting put him and another Democratic representative in the same district. He was elected to the state senate in the 2012 and 2014 elections.

He ran for the Democratic nomination in the Colorado's 7th congressional district during the 2018 election, but dropped out after Representative Ed Perlmutter announced that he would seek reelection. Kerr was elected to the Jefferson County Commission in the 2020 election.

== Early life and education ==
Andrew Steven Kerr was born on October 21, 1968. His family moved to Lakewood, Colorado when he was eight and he attended Foothills Elementary School, Dunstan Middle School, and Green Mountain High School. He graduated from the University of Colorado Denver with a bachelor's degree in geography and a master's degree in information and learning technologies. He worked as a geography teacher for middle and high school and is a member of the Colorado Education Association. He married Tammy, with whom he had three children.

== Colorado state legislature ==
=== Elections ===
In 2006, Betty Boyd, a member of the Colorado House of Representatives, was selected by a vacancy committee to replace Deanna Hanna in the Colorado Senate following Hanna's resignation. Kerr was selected by a vacancy committee to replace Boyd in the state house. He defeated Republican nominee Glenn Rhoades in the 2006 election. He defeated Republican nominee Ray Warren in the 2008 election. He defeated Republican nominee Mark A. Barrington in the 2010 election. Lois Court, who later served as the President pro tempore of the state senate, worked as his campaign manager and legislative aid.

Kerr, Max Tyler, and Ken Summers were reapportioned into the same district following the 2010 United States census. Kerr announced on December 19, 2011, that he would run for a seat in the state senate from the 22nd district rather than run against Tyler in the state house primary. He defeated Republican nominee Summers in the 2012 election. He defeated Republican nominee Tony Sanchez in the 2014 election.

=== Tenure ===
During Kerr's tenure in the state house he served on the Education, Finance, and Judiciary committees. He and Representative Rhonda Fields received death threats in 2013 due to their support of gun control legislation. He was selected to replace Representative Dorothy Butcher as Majority Whip after her resignation in 2007. He was later selected to serve as the Assistant Majority Leader. In 2014, he nominated Senator Matt Jones to serve as the Minority Whip.

Ed Perlmutter, a member of the United States House of Representatives from the 7th congressional district, announced on April 9, 2017, that he would run in the gubernatorial election. Kerr announced on April 12, that he would seek the Democratic nomination in the congressional district for the 2018 election and later selected Shad Murib, who previously served as the chief of staff of the Colorado Senate Democrats and managed Kerry Donovan's 2014 campaign, as his campaign manager. However, Perlmutter announced that he would run for reelection on August 21, after having dropped out of the gubernatorial election, causing Senator Dominick Moreno and Representative Brittany Pettersen to end their campaigns. Kerr ended his campaign on August 22, and endorsed Perlmutter. During the campaign he raised and spent $124,888.98.

== Later life ==
Casey Tighe, a member of the Jefferson county commission, was term-limited during the 2020 election. Kerr won the Democratic nomination to succeed her and defeated Republican nominee Joni Inman in the general election. During the 2020 presidential election Kerr endorsed Senator Elizabeth Warren for the Democratic presidential nomination. Kerr was re-elected to the county commission in 2024.

== Political positions ==
Kerr received an A rating from NARAL Pro-Choice America. He was among thirty-seven legislators who endorsed a letter in 2018, calling for Planned Parenthood to allow for their workers to form a union. Kerr organized a letter signed by over four hundred state legislators opposing the nomination of Betsy DeVos as United States Secretary of Education and sent it to Lamar Alexander and Patty Murray. He sponsored legislation that would have entered Colorado into the National Popular Vote Interstate Compact. Kerr voted in favor of repealing capital punishment in 2009. He voted in favor of legislation to prohibit conversion therapy on minors.

== Electoral history ==
2006 Colorado House of Representatives 26th district election
Primary election
Party	Candidate	Votes	%
Democratic	Andy Kerr (incumbent)	3,152	100.00%
Total votes		3,152	100.00%
General election
Democratic	Andy Kerr (incumbent)	14,025	61.19%
Republican	Glenn Rhoades	8,895	38.81%
Total votes		22,920	100.00%

2008 Colorado House of Representatives 26th district election
Primary election
Party	Candidate	Votes	%
Democratic	Andy Kerr (incumbent)	3,645	100.00%
Total votes		3,645	100.00%
General election
Democratic	Andy Kerr (incumbent)	18,850	60.66%
Republican	Ray Warren	12,226	39.34%
Total votes		31,076	100.00%

2010 Colorado House of Representatives 26th district election
Primary election
Party	Candidate	Votes	%
Democratic	Andy Kerr (incumbent)	4,851	100.00%
Total votes		4,851	100.00%
General election
Democratic	Andy Kerr (incumbent)	13,624	56.63%
Republican	Mark A. Barrington	10,435	43.37%
Total votes		24,059	100.00%

2012 Colorado Senate 22nd district election
Primary election
Party	Candidate	Votes	%
Democratic	Andy Kerr	5,484	100.00%
Total votes		5,484	100.00%
General election
Democratic	Andy Kerr	38,845	52.60%
Republican	Ken Summers	35,008	47.40%
Total votes		73,853	100.00%

2014 Colorado Senate 22nd district election
Primary election
Party	Candidate	Votes	%
Democratic	Andy Kerr (incumbent)	5,735	100.00%
Total votes		5,735	100.00%
General election
Democratic	Andy Kerr (incumbent)	30,510	51.12%
Republican	Tony Sanchez	29,174	48.88%
Total votes		59,684	100.00%

2020 Jefferson County Commission 2nd district election
Primary election
Party	Candidate	Votes	%
Democratic	Andy Kerr	104,740	100.00%
Total votes		104,740	100.00%
General election
Democratic	Andy Kerr	196,236	55.55%
Republican	Joni Inman	157,048	44.45%
Total votes		353,284	100.00%

2024 Jefferson County Commission 2nd district election
Primary election
Party	Candidate	Votes	%
Democratic	Andy Kerr (incumbent)	57,938	100.00%
Total votes		57,938	100.00%
General election
Democratic	Andy Kerr (incumbent)	188,220	56.18%
Republican	Natalie Menten	146,803	43.82%
Total votes		335,023	100.00%
