= Ken Summers (politician) =

American politician

Kenneth Summers
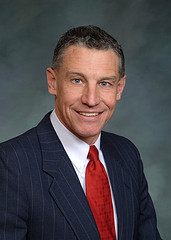

Member of the Colorado House of Representatives from the 22nd district
- In office January 10, 2007 – 2013
- Preceded by: Matt Knoedler
- Succeeded by: Justin Everett

Personal details
- Born: November 12, 1953 (age 72) Denver, Colorado, U.S.
- Party: Republican
- Spouse: Debbie
- Profession: Pastor

Kenneth Guy Summers (born November 12, 1953) is a retired Colorado legislator. Elected to the Colorado House of Representatives as a Republican in 2006, Summers represented House District 22, including southern Lakewood, Colorado, and portions of Jefferson County from 2006 to 2012.

== Biography ==
Born in Denver, Colorado, Summers was raised in Englewood, Colorado and graduated from Englewood High School. He earned a bachelor's degree in business education from the University of Northern Colorado in 1976, and was a business teacher at Englewood High School for two years before beginning a career in Christian ministry.

Summers became associate pastor of Lakewood First Assembly of God in 1978 and then senior pastor of High Plains Christian Center in Strasburg, Colorado in 1982. While in Strasburg, Summers was a member of the Strasburg Parks and Recreation District Board, and the Board of Education for Strasburg School District 31J from 1986 to 1989; he was also a volunteer coach at Strasburg High School.

In 1989, Summers relocated to Colby, Kansas, where he was senior pastor of College Drive Assembly. In Colby, he was a volunteer assistant baseball coach alongside Joe Giarratano at Colby Community College and was a volunteer National Guard Chaplain.

He returned to Colorado in 1992 as senior pastor of Dakota Ridge Assembly in Littleton. While a pastor, he served as a sectional presbyter in the Rocky Mountain District Council of the Assemblies of God. Summers' community service while leading Dakota Ridge Assembly includes being a member and president of the South Jeffco Rotary Club, advisor to the Sox Place youth drop-in center in Denver, treasurer of NeighborHope Ministries, and a board member of Teen Challenge of the Rocky Mountains. He also helped found and served as president of Jericho Road Mentoring, a program to recruit mentors for children of prisoners.

Summers earned a master's degree in nonprofit management from Regis University in 2005 and served as the executive director of Teen Challenge of the Rocky Mountains from 2006 to 2013. He has also served on the board of Arapahoe Credit Union in Littleton, Colorado Summers is married; he and his wife, Debbie have two children: Christian and Stephanie. He currently serves as an affiliate faculty member at Colorado Christian University in the School of Nonprofit Management.

In 2013, within a month after moving to Fort Collins, Colorado, Summers was hospitalized with a life-threatening case of West Nile Virus. This resulted in almost five months of hospitalization and rehabilitation and some permanent mobility impairment. His book entitled, "The Longest Campaign" chronicles his health crisis and personal reflections on lessons learned.

=== Political activities ===
Summers served on the precinct committee of the Jefferson County Republican Party from 2002 to 2006. In 2007, as a state legislator, Summers was named a member of the Colorado Legislative Leadership Team for former Massachusetts governor Mitt Romney's presidential campaign. Shortly before Super Tuesday in February, he was announced as a Jefferson County chair for Romney's campaign.

== Legislative career ==
=== 2006 election ===
Summers faced Democrat Jayson Haberkorn, an elementary school teacher, in the 2006 race for the 22nd house district seat. Summers was endorsed by the Rocky Mountain News and the Denver Post. Summers won in the Republican-leaning district with 53 percent of the popular vote.

=== 2007 legislative session ===
During the 2007 legislative session, Summers served on the House Education Committee and the House Local Government Committee.

Summers sponsored a resolution declaring Colorado Charter Schools Week in April 2007, and unsuccessful legislation to allow individuals to deduct out-of-pocket medical expenses from taxable income.

=== 2008 legislative session ===
In the 2008 session of the Colorado General Assembly, Summers sits on the House Education Committee and the House Local Government Committee.

For the 2008 legislative session, Summers has sponsored legislation to restrict the eminent domain power of Denver's RTD, after the transit agency attempted to take property used by private businesses along a new rail line. Another of Summers' bills would have required voters to present photo identification, but was killed in committee. He has also introduced bills to create performance incentives for public school teachers, and to facilitate the continuation of specialized license plates for state colleges.

=== 2008 election ===
Summers sought a second term in the 2008 Colorado legislative elections, running against Democrat Camille Ryckman. His re-election bid was endorsed by the Denver Post, and he won with 54 percent of the popular vote.

=== 2009 legislative session ===
For the 2009 legislative session, Summers was named to seats on the House Education Committee and the House Finance Committee. Shortly before the beginning of the session, Summers was also named to an ethics panel charged with investigating allegations of vote-buying on the part of Rep. David Balmer in a house leadership election.

Summers plans to sponsor legislation to provide tax credits to investors in startup companies that stem from university research projects. Summers also reintroduce his legislation to require photo IDs in order to vote, a measure which was killed in committee on a party-line vote. Summers also sponsored legislation to limit damages collected by uninsured drivers in automobile accidents.

=== 2010 legislative session ===
Summers sponsored an overhaul of the state's food stamp system, now known as SNAP with centrist Jefferson County Democrat Sara Gagliardi. The measure, House Bill 1022, underwent extensive revisions due to its contentious nature. As introduced, it would have expanded food stamp eligibility, removed an asset test, extended the certification period for food assistance, and created an outreach plan to pair private volunteer groups with the government in order to promote awareness of SNAP and to help counties deal with increased caseloads. Though the original bill proved expensive in light of the state's dire economic forecast, subsequent amendments brought costs under control while still preserving the core of the measure. After a lengthy period in negotiation, the measure was passed 52–10 in the House, and 22–12 in the Senate. Once signed into law, 1022 became the new backbone of Colorado's food assistance program.

=== 2012 legislative session ===
Representative Summers announced that he would not seek re-election to the Colorado House, and would instead run for the state senate in district 22.

=== 2012 election ===
In the 2012 General Election, Representative Summers faced Democratic opponent Andy Kerr, also a fellow member of the Colorado House, in the race for the Colorado State Senate District 22 seat. Kerr was elected to the Senate by a narrow margin of 52% to 48%.

=== 2017 election ===
Summers faced Gordon Coombes in the 2017 race for the Fort Collins City Council district 3 seat. He won with 54 percent of the popular vote.
