= Deanna Hanna =

American politician

Member of the Colorado Senate from the 21st district
- In office January 10, 2001 – March 22, 2006
- Preceded by: Mike Feeley
- Succeeded by: Betty Boyd

Personal details
- Born: April 20, 1943 (age 83) Flatonia, Texas
- Party: Democratic

Deanna Hanna (born April 20, 1943) is an American politician who served in the Colorado Senate from the 21st district from 2001 to 2006.
