= Saira Rao =

American activist and author

- Born: June 12, 1974 (age 52); Richmond, Virginia, U.S.
- Education: University of Virginia (BA); New York University (JD)
- Occupations: Political activist; author; publisher; lawyer
- Organization(s): Race2Dinner, In This Together Media, Haven, Here4TheKids
- Works: Chambermaid: A Novel
- Spouse: Shiv Govindan
- Children: 2

Saira Sameera Rao (born June 12, 1974) is an American political activist, author, publisher, and former Wall Street lawyer and television producer. She is the co-founder of Race2Dinner, In This Together Media, and Haven, and came to greater prominence in 2018 when she ran for Congress, losing out to incumbent Democrat Diana DeGette in the primary.

== Early life and career ==
A second-generation Indian-American, Rao was born in Richmond, Virginia, the daughter of Dr. Sybil Philomena "Greenie" (née Nazareth) Rao and Dr. Jaikar Rao. Both her parents are physicians from Southern India; Her mother is a Konkani Mangalorean Catholic from Coimbatore, Tamil Nadu, and her father is from Mangaluru, Karnataka.

She received a bachelor's degree in history from the University of Virginia in 1996 and went on to work as a journalist and television producer for CBS affiliate WUSA in Washington DC and Fox News affiliate WSVN in Miami. In 2002 she received a J.D. from New York University School of Law and took up a clerkship under Third Circuit court judge Dolores Sloviter between 2002 and 2003 in Philadelphia. She was then an associate in corporate law at Cleary Gottlieb.

== Novel ==
In 2007, Saira Rao's first novel was published. Chambermaid concerns a recent law graduate called Sheila Raj who is a law clerk to Third Circuit judge Helga Friedman, described as a "sociopathic, homicidal, bipolar jurist" and a "toxic bitch." Rao had herself been a law clerk to Third Circuit judge Dolores Sloviter, and other characters in the book were also seen as having real-world counterparts. Rao began writing it while working at Cleary Gottlieb, but left the firm in November 2006 after they learned the topic of the book. For a lawyer to discuss a judge so unflatteringly, even in a fictionalized manner, was considered at least unusual and Rao attributed her desire to write the book partly to address that informal code of silence. Sloviter herself brushed the matter off, saying "I've had maybe close to a hundred law clerks, and it's not surprising that one or two hated me" and "I haven't read it. I don't intend to. I really don't care. OK?"

Kirkus Reviews described Chambermaid as "unoriginal", saying "at least Miranda Priestly was fun". Carlin Romano of The Philadelphia Inquirer described it as "highly entertaining, often insightful, frequently sarcastic and at times extremely nasty". Paula Reed Ward for the Pittsburgh Post-Gazette found that "even if the stories are too hard to believe, they are so often written with such an easy, casual air, that they prompt nothing but laughs".

In a 2013 interview Rao said that there was also a film deal attached to Chambermaid, though no film has been produced as of 2021.

Rao had said that her second book, a memoir called Broken News, about "her experience with racism in the new media", was to be published in spring 2020.

== In This Together ==
In 2013, Rao and her friend from her University of Virginia days, comedian and recruiter Carey Albertine, founded In This Together Media, a publishing company intended to extend the range of children's books about girls, and their diversity in racial and other terms. The company operates a mixed model for acquiring titles, sometimes receiving submissions and sometimes commissioning authors to write stories based on ideas generated in-house. Initially the titles were print-on-demand rather than produced in bulk. Later, Rao reported success in selling books to other publishing houses such as Simon & Schuster, rather than publishing books directly themselves.

In This Together had a hand in the book Nevertheless, We Persisted, a collection of 48 short essays with a foreword by Amy Klobuchar.

== Run for Congress ==
In 2018 Rao ran against Representative Diana DeGette in the Democratic primary for Colorado's 1st congressional district. She received endorsements from, among others, Andrew Yang, the Justice Democrats PAC, and Buie Seawell, former chair of the Colorado Democratic Party, but lost the primary 32% to 68%. In the first quarter, Rao raised more money ($250,000) than DeGette ($240,000) for her campaign. DeGette ultimately spent more, reporting $720,000 expended compared to Rao's $415,000.

A month later, Rao tweeted "Short and long answer: YES", in response to a New York Times op-ed by philosopher George Yancy titled "Should I Give Up On White People?". She said that the threats she received in response made her family unsafe and that she had to temporarily leave Colorado.

== Views ==
Rao considers herself a progressive. Prior to the election of Donald Trump, Rao had been a long-standing supporter of the Democratic party and particularly Hillary Clinton, who lost in that election. Subsequently, Rao felt disillusioned by the party leadership, which she felt had failed to respond properly or to listen to the concerns of non-white women. In 2017, she wrote an opinion piece for HuffPost about her reasons for "breaking up" with the party. She said afterwards that she was "mortified" in retrospect by her support of Clinton, but said that it was not the party she was breaking up with, as she'd previously put it, but rather the "Democratic Party establishment".

She ran in the 2018 primary. In an op-ed for Teen Vogue she identified her main goal in running as being to promote and achieve "equity — racial, social, and economic", with policy positions including reforms to gun law, a path to citizenship, and reducing the influence of corporate money in politics.

Rao has on occasion been fiercely critical of Democrats whom she does not regard as sufficiently progressive—"true blue". During the primaries for the 2020 presidential election she accused candidate Pete Buttigieg of "OPEN racism" and cited his Vanity Fair cover as an example of "the media" as a "white supremacy leader". She also said that because speaker of the House Nancy Pelosi is a white feminist, she is a white supremacist, and therefore "if you idolize Nancy Pelosi, you may as well declare allegiance to David Duke".

Her tweets have attracted attention. She has written that "private messages of support is another form of white supremacy", "American schools are white supremacy factories", "white supremacy is behind all violence" and "whiteness is literally killing us all". In February 2022 she declared that all Republicans, or anyone married to or friends with a Republican, are fascists.

=== Pro-Palestine activism and accusations of antisemitism ===
In 2023, during the Gaza war, the Creative Artists Agency severed ties with Rao after she referred to Israelis as "bloodthirsty genocidal ghouls" who are so "obsessed with land and power and money that you murder newborns to obtain this STUFF". She claimed that "the vast majority of white Americans are pro-genocide", as is the CAA itself, for failing to condemn what she alleges is the ongoing genocide of Palestinians.

Rao received attention for a post on X/Twitter in which she attacked Time magazine for naming Taylor Swift as its Person of the Year; Rao accused the magazine of "White nonsense, white violence, white love of Black and brown genocide" for selecting Swift, who Rao alleged would be able to singlehandedly stop the genocide of Palestinians with one Instagram post, but chooses not to.

In 2024, Rao alleged on X/Twitter that Zionist medical professionals pose a threat to Black and Muslim patients. Rao's tweet was condemned as antisemitic by Knesset member Ahmad Tibi, former cable news pundit Mehdi Hasan, and sociologist Philip N. Cohen, but was defended by anti-racist activist Bree Newsome, professor of hospital medicine at the University of California San Francisco Rupa Marya, and German-Palestinian film director Lexi Alexander. Jewish publication The Forward compared the post to the Doctors' plot, a state-sponsored propaganda campaign in the Soviet Union alleging that a cabal of Jewish doctors were trying to assassinate Soviet officials.

== Race2Dinner and Haven ==
After her run for Congress, frustrated with conversations about race started with her by individual white female voters, Rao co-founded "Race2Dinner" with Regina Jackson, an educator and realtor whom she got to know on the campaign trail. Beginning in spring 2019, Jackson and Rao attend dinners with 8–10 white women, hosted and catered by one of the white women, and lead a conversation aimed at confronting the women with their own racism. Fifteen such dinners had been held by February 2020 and when the COVID-19 pandemic hit, they had 25 more planned for the year. As a result of pandemic, they switched to virtual dinner parties held on Zoom (without food) about twice a week and, following a spike in interest since the murder of George Floyd, the charge for such a dinner doubled from $2,500 to $5,000. They also offer individual consultations and "Race2Community", which is an 8-week online course, in addition to maintaining a Patreon account for subscribers. Rao and Jackson are clear that the conversations have to be "uncomfortable", even "painful", but their approach has changed over time. Certain early attendees described conversations as leading to tears, and Rao as "mean-spirited" and "dogmatic". Since then, they have made Robin DiAngelo's 2018 book White Fragility required reading before dinners.

Jackson and Rao wrote a book together based on their experience with Race2Dinner. The book, published by Penguin Random House, is titled White Women: Everything You Already Know About Your Own Racism and How to Do Better.

In 2020, Rao co-founded "Haven" together with political organiser Candice Fortin and academic Tamara L. Lee. Haven is "a collective of BIWOC and non-binary identifying folks rooted towards abolition, liberation and healing through art and storytelling".

In 2024, conservative activist Matt Walsh infiltrated a Race2Dinner event in Atlanta by posing as a waiter, interrupting it at several points.

== Personal life ==
Rao is married to businessman Shiv Govindan.

== Bibliography ==
- Chambermaid: A Novel. New York: Grove Press. 2008. ISBN 978-0-8021-4372-3.
- Broken News (forthcoming)
- The Madlands (forthcoming)
- White Women: Everything You Already Know About Your Own Racism and How to Do Better (with Regina Jackson) (2022 ISBN 9780143136439)
