= Betty Boyd (Colorado legislator) =

American state legislator

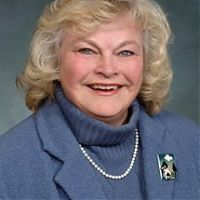

Member of the Colorado Senate from the 21st district
- In office March 2006 – January 9, 2013
- Preceded by: Deanna Hanna
- Succeeded by: Jessie Ulibarri

Member of the Colorado House of Representatives from the 26th district
- In office 2001–2006
- Succeeded by: Andy Kerr

Personal details
- Born: September 16, 1943 (age 82) Manchester, Connecticut, U.S.
- Party: Democratic
- Spouse: Douglas
- Children: 2
- Website: Official website

Betty Boyd (born September 16, 1943) is an American state legislator. She represented the 21st district in the Colorado State Senate.

During her term, she chaired the Health and Human Services Committee and served for a time as the senate president pro tempore.

== Biography ==
=== Early life and education ===
Betty earned a baccalaureate degree in sociology from Upsala College in New Jersey.

=== Legislative career ===
- Former President Pro Tempore, Colorado State Senate
- Senator, Colorado State Senate, 2006-2012 or 2013
  - 2011-2012 Committees:
    - Health and Human Services Committee, Colorado State Senate, Chair
    - Legislative Council Committee, Colorado General Assembly
    - State, Veterans, and Military Affairs Committee, Colorado State Senate
  - 2009-2010 Committees:
    - Health and Human Services Committee, Colorado Senate
    - State, Veterans & Military Affairs Committee, Colorado Senate
- Representative, Colorado State House of Representatives, 2001-2006

=== Marriage and children ===
Betty and Douglas Boyd have two adult children, Jim and Kirsten.
