= Green Party of Colorado =

Colorado affiliate of the Green Party

- Founded: 1994; 32 years ago
- Headquarters: P.O.Box 11171, Denver, Colorado 80211
- Membership (2026): ▼7,955
- Ideology: Green politics
- Political position: Left-wing
- National affiliation: Green Party of the United States
- Colors: Green
- Seats in the U.S. Senate: 0 / 2
- Seats in the U.S. House: 0 / 8
- Colorado Senate: 0 / 35
- Colorado House of Representatives: 0 / 65
- Other elected officials: 2 (February 2024)

Website
- greenpartycolorado.org

The Green Party of Colorado (GPCO) is the affiliate of the Green Party of the United States for the state of Colorado.

== Overview ==
The Green Party of Colorado first attempted to qualify for statewide ballot status in 1994. While the party was unsuccessful in gaining ballot access, the party did qualify for Qualified Political Organization status. This made it possible to register as a Green in Colorado.

The Green Party of Colorado qualified for statewide ballot status in July 1998 and has retained its ballot status ever since.

In 2000, the Green Party of Colorado hosted the 2000 national convention of the Green Party of the United States in Denver.

In the 2006 mid-term elections, Tom Kelly running for U.S. House of Representatives District 1 received 20.2% of the vote, the best finish of any Green running for Congress in 2006.

In 2012 and 2016, the party's candidate for president was Dr. Jill Stein. Howie Hawkins was the party's candidate for president in 2020. Dr. Jill Stein was the party's candidate for president once again in 2024.

== Elected officials ==
Current public officeholders:

- Tim Barnes, City Council, Lafayette
- Bryan Williams, Director School Board District R-1, Ouray County

Former public officeholders:

- Art Goodtimes, Board of Commissioners (San Miguel County)
- Scott Chaplin, Board of Trustees, Carbondale
- Jeffery Bergeron, Town Council, Breckenridge (Summit County)
- Wendy Mimiaga, Town Board, Dolores (Cortez County)
- Matt Keefauver, Town Council, Cortez (Montezuma County)
- Charlie Green, School Board, District E, Fremont RE-3
- Peter Gleichman, Mayor, Ward, CO (Boulder County)
- Tanya Ishikawa, Federal Heights City Council, Ward I
- Michelle Haynes, Town Board, Norwood
- Andrea Mérida Cuéllar, Denver Board of Education, Denver Public Schools District 2
- Becky Elder, Councillor, City of Manitou Springs

== Active chapters and caucuses ==
- Arapahoe County Green Party
- Denver Green Party
- Longmont Green Party
