= Diane Mitsch Bush =

American politician (born 1950)

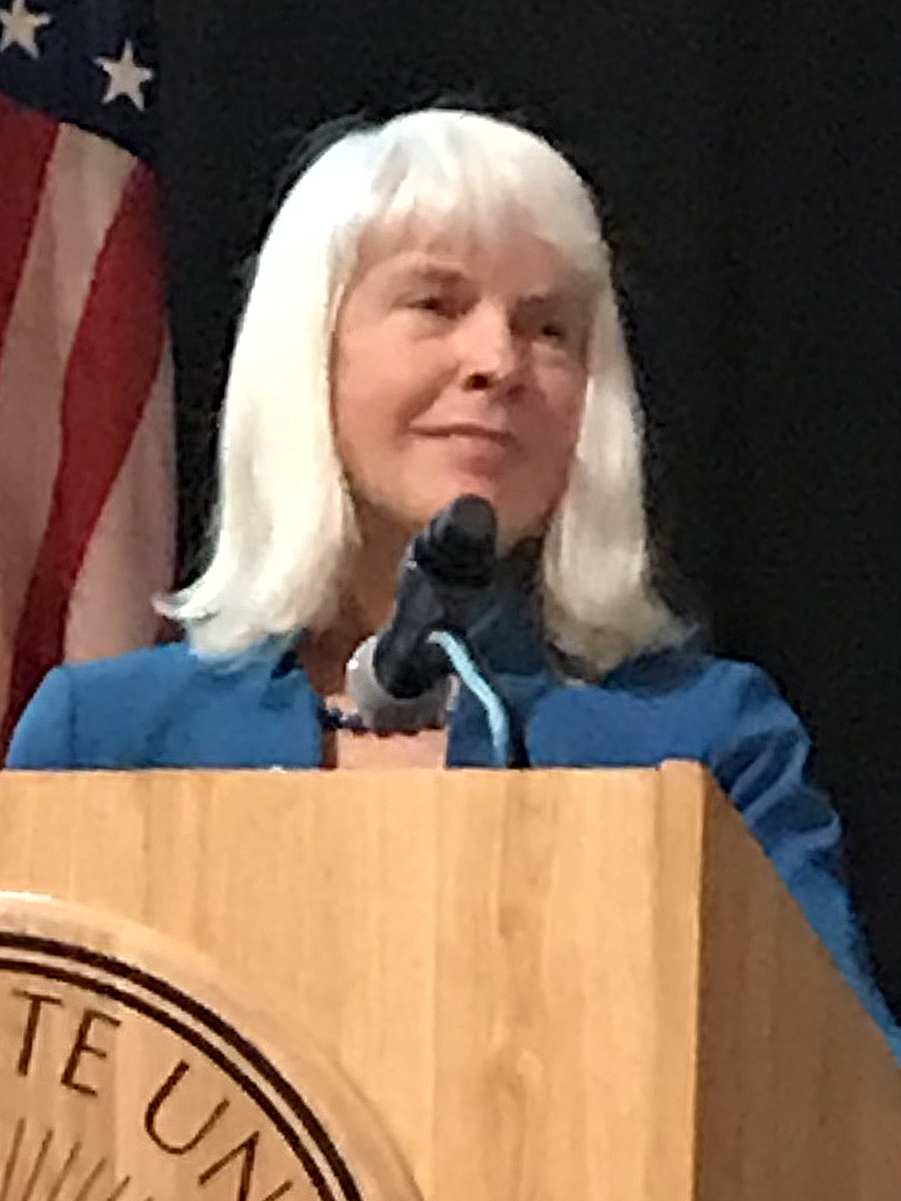

Member of the Colorado House of Representatives from the 26th district
- In office January 9, 2013 – November 2, 2017
- Preceded by: Andy Kerr
- Succeeded by: Dylan Roberts

Personal details
- Born: February 17, 1950 (age 75); Saint Paul, Minnesota, U.S.
- Political party: Democratic
- Education: University of Minnesota (BA, MA, PhD)
- Website: Campaign website

Diane E. Mitsch Bush (born February 17, 1950) is an American politician and retired sociology professor who served as a member of the Colorado House of Representatives. She was the Democratic nominee for the U.S. House of Representatives in the 2018 and 2020 elections in Colorado's 3rd congressional district, losing both times.

== Early life and education ==
Mitsch Bush attended the University of Minnesota. She graduated with a Bachelor of Arts in sociology in 1975. She earned a Master of Arts and Doctor of Philosophy in sociology and social policy.

== Career ==
Prior to 2012, Mitsch Bush served as a commissioner of Routt County, Colorado. She then served as a member of the Colorado House of Representatives for the 26th district from January 9, 2013, to November 2, 2017, after which she resigned to focus on her campaign for Congress.

In 2013, Mitsch Bush voted for universal background checks and magazine limits in Colorado.

In 2016, Mitsch Bush co-sponsored and voted to require state contractors to comply with federal equal pay standards.

Mitsch Bush sponsored the bipartisan Debt-free Schools Act in Colorado in 2016, later signed by the governor, to increase public school funding in Colorado.

Mitsch Bush served as a member on the Colorado House Committee for Agriculture, Livestock, and Natural Resources from 2013-2017, serving as the Vice Chair in 2017.

=== 2018 U.S. House election ===
In July 2017, Mitsch Bush announced her candidacy for the congressional seat held by Scott Tipton, and won the Democratic nomination in June 2018. She was defeated in the general election by Tipton by 26,779 votes.

=== 2020 U.S. House election ===
Mitsch Bush was the nominee in the 2020 election after defeating seafood executive James Iacino. She faced Lauren Boebert, a restaurant owner from Rifle, Colorado, who defeated Tipton in the Republican primary. She lost the November 3, 2020 general election by 26,512 votes.

== Personal life ==
Mitsch Bush has lived in Steamboat Springs, Colorado since 1976. Mitsch Bush is married to Michael Paul.

== Elections ==
- 2012 When Democratic representative Andy Kerr ran for the Colorado Senate and left the 26th district seat open, Mitsch Bush was unopposed for the June 26, 2012, Democratic primary, winning with 1,738 votes; and won the November 6, 2012, general election with 18,470 votes (55.8%) against Republican nominee Charles McConnell.
- 2018 During the Democratic primary for Colorado's 3rd district that took place on June 26, 2018, Mitsch Bush defeated two Democratic opponents, Karl Hanlon and Arn Menconi, to win the primary with 42,048 votes (64.12%). Incumbent congressman Scott Tipton defeated her in the general election.
- 2020 Mitsch Bush was defeated by Lauren Boebert by six percent on November 3, 2020, 51.27% to 45.41%. Boebert raised $2.4 million and Mitsch Bush raised $4.2 million. Republican groups spent more than $5 million. Democratic groups spent nearly $4 million.

Colorado's 3rd congressional district, 2020
Party	Candidate	Votes	%
Republican	Lauren Boebert	215,279	51.27
Democratic	Diane Mitsch Bush	190,695	45.41
Libertarian	John Keil	9,841	2.34
Unity	Critter Milton	4,104	0.98
Total votes		419,919	100.0

Colorado House of Representatives
Preceded by Andy Kerr	Member of the Colorado House of Representatives from the 26th district 2013–2017	Succeeded by Dylan Roberts
