= 2022 United States House of Representatives elections in Colorado =

- November 8, 2022

All 8 Colorado seats to the United States House of Representatives
	Majority party	Minority party
Party	Democratic	Republican
Last election	4	3
Seats won	5	3
Seat change	▲1	Steady
Popular vote	1,365,427	1,051,030
Percentage	55.23%	42.51%
Swing	▲2.18%	▼1.04%

Democratic hold Democratic gain
Republican hold
Democratic
40–50%
50–60%
60–70%
70–80%
80–90%
Republican
50–60%
60–70%
70–80%
80–90%

The 2022 United States House of Representatives elections in Colorado were held on November 8, 2022, to elect the eight U.S. representatives from the state of Colorado, one from each of the state's eight congressional districts. The elections coincided with the Colorado gubernatorial election, other elections to the U.S. House of Representatives, elections to the U.S. Senate, and various state and local elections.

District boundaries were redrawn to ensure that the districts are apportioned based on data from the 2020 census, which added an eighth seat to Colorado's delegation.

== Statewide results ==
Party	Candidates	Votes		Seats		
Party	Candidates	No.	%	No.	+/–	%
Democratic Party	8	1,365,427	55.23%	5	▲1	62.5%
Republican Party	8	1,051,030	42.51%	3	Steady	37.5%
Libertarian Party	5	34,234	1.38%	0	Steady	0.0%
American Constitution Party	3	14,428	0.58%	0	Steady	0.0%
Unity Party	2	3,796	0.15%	0	Steady	0.0%
Colorado Center Party	1	2,876	0.12%	0	Steady	0.0%
Write-in	4	414	0.02%	0	Steady	0.0%
Independent	1	9	>0.01%	0	Steady	0.0%
Total	35	2,472,214	100%	8	▲1	100%

Statewide popular vote
Democratic	55.23%
Republican	42.51%
Libertarian	1.38%
American Constitution	0.58%
Unity	0.15%
Colorado Center	0.12%
Write-in	0.02%
Independent	0.01%

House seats
Democratic	62.5%
Republican	37.5%

== District 1 ==
2022 Colorado's 1st congressional district election
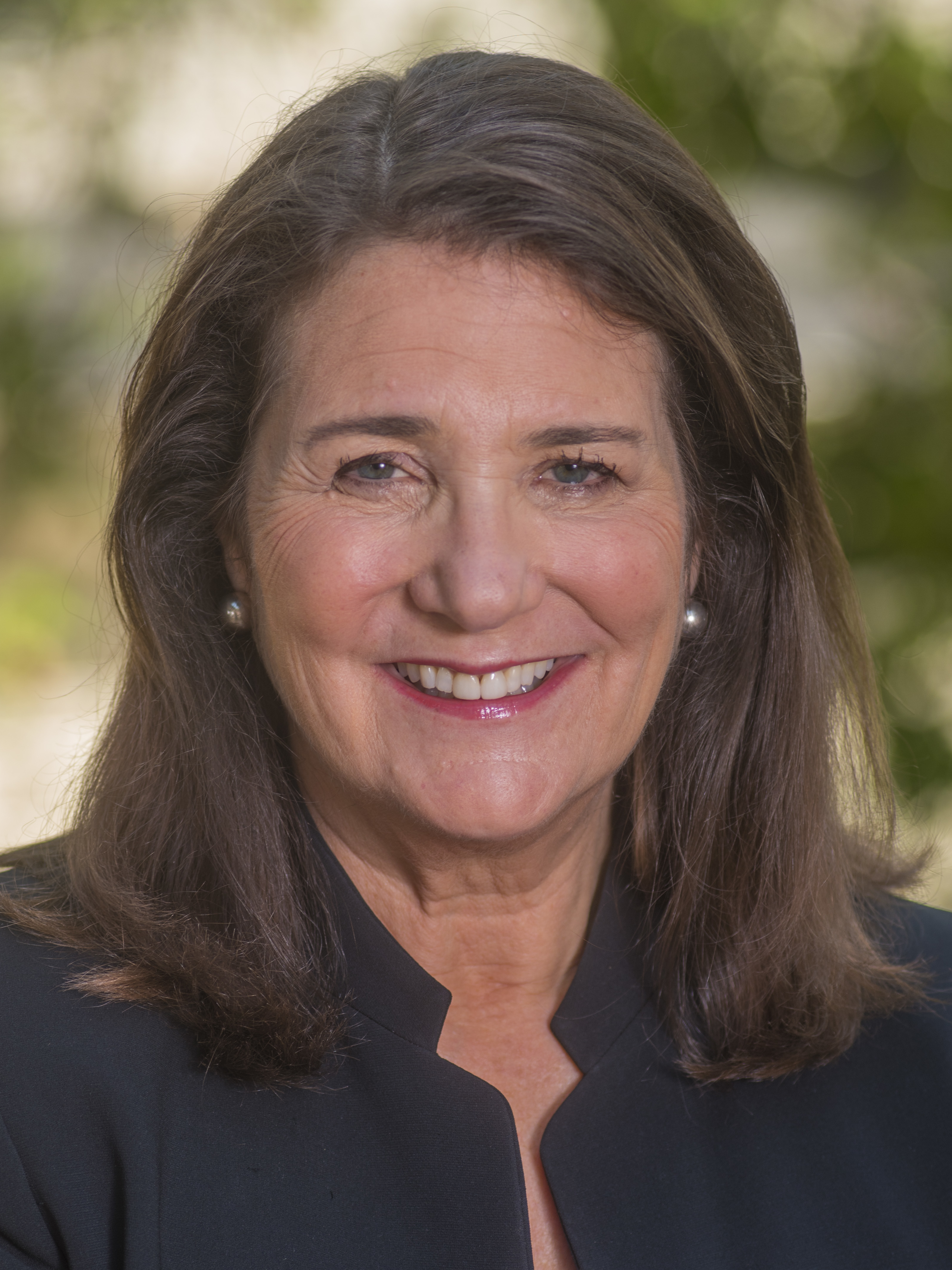

Nominee	Diana DeGette	Jennifer Qualteri
Party	Democratic	Republican
Popular vote	226,929	49,529
Percentage	80.27%	17.52%
- DeGette: 50–60% 60–70% 70–80% 80–90% >90% No votes
U.S. Representative before election
Diana DeGette
Democratic
Elected U.S. Representative
Diana DeGette
Democratic

The 1st district includes almost all of Denver, as well as the enclaves of Glendale and Holly Hills. The district is very similar to its predecessor before 2020 redistricting. The incumbent was Democrat Diana DeGette, who was re-elected with 73.6% of the vote in 2020. She was running for re-election.

=== Democratic primary ===
==== Candidates ====
===== Nominee =====
- Diana DeGette, incumbent U.S. representative

===== Eliminated in primary =====
- Neal Walia, grassroots activist and former staffer for Governor John Hickenlooper

===== Did not qualify =====
- Dom Waters, graphic artist and educator

==== Endorsements ====
Diana DeGette

U.S. representatives

- Pramila Jayapal, U.S. representative for Washington's 7th congressional district (2017–present)
- Mark Pocan, U.S. representative for Wisconsin's 2nd congressional district (2013–present)
- Jamie Raskin, U.S. representative for Maryland's 8th congressional district (2017–present)

Organizations

- Colorado Professional Firefighters
- Congressional Progressive Caucus
- Laborers' International Union of North America Local 720
- League of Conservation Voters
- NARAL Pro-Choice America
- Planned Parenthood Action Fund
- Service Employees International Union of Colorado
- Sierra Club
- Southwest Regional Council of Carpenters
Neal Walia

Individuals

- Marianne Williamson, author and candidate for the Democratic nomination for president of the United States in 2020

Organizations

- Progressive Democrats of America
- ~~Working Families Party~~

==== Results ====
Democratic primary results
Party	Candidate	Votes	%
Democratic	Diana DeGette (incumbent)	79,391	81.1
Democratic	Neal Walia	18,472	18.9
Total votes		97,863	100.0

=== Republican primary ===
==== Candidates ====
===== Nominee =====
- Jennifer Qualteri

==== Results ====
Republican primary results
Party	Candidate	Votes	%
Republican	Jennifer Qualteri	18,568	100.0
Total votes		18,568	100.0

=== General election ===
==== Predictions ====
Source	Ranking	As of
The Cook Political Report	Solid D	November 29, 2021
Inside Elections	Solid D	November 22, 2021
Sabato's Crystal Ball	Safe D	November 17, 2021
Politico	Solid D	April 5, 2022
RCP	Safe D	June 9, 2022
Fox News	Solid D	July 11, 2022
DDHQ	Solid D	July 20, 2022
538	Solid D	June 30, 2022
The Economist	Safe D	September 28, 2022

==== Results ====
2022 Colorado's 1st congressional district election
Party	Candidate	Votes	%
Democratic	Diana DeGette (incumbent)	226,929	80.27
Republican	Jennifer Qualteri	49,530	17.52
Libertarian	John Kittleson	6,157	2.17
Green	Iris Boswell (write-in)	70	0.02
Total votes		282,686	100.00
Democratic hold			

===== By county =====
County	Diana DeGette Democratic		Jennifer Qualteri Republican		John Kittleson Libertarian		Iris Boswell Green (write-in)		Margin		Total
County	Votes	%	Votes	%	Votes	%	Votes	%	Votes	%	Total
Arapahoe	2,117	74.83%	661	23.37%	51	1.80%	0	0.00%	1,456	51.47%	2,829
Denver	224,812	80.33%	48,869	17.46%	6,106	2.18%	70	0.03%	175,943	62.87%	279,857

== District 2 ==
2022 Colorado's 2nd congressional district election
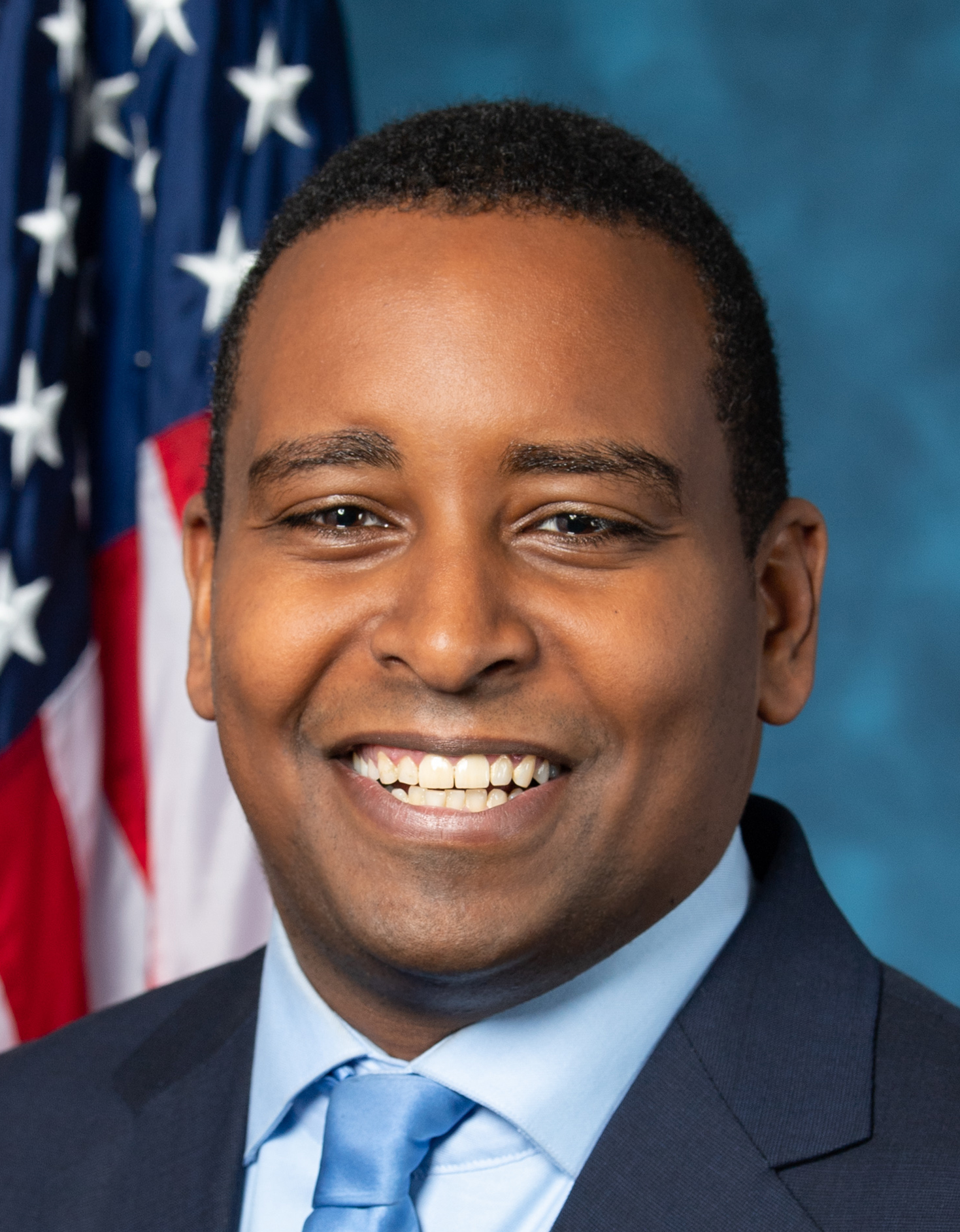

Nominee	Joe Neguse	Marshall Dawson
Party	Democratic	Republican
Popular vote	244,107	97,770
Percentage	69.98%	28.01%
- Neguse: 40–50% 50–60% 60–70% 70–80% 80–90% >90% Dawson: 40–50% 50–60% 60–70% 70–80% 80–90% >90% No votes
U.S. Representative before election
Joe Neguse
Democratic
Elected U.S. Representative
Joe Neguse
Democratic

The 2nd district is located in north-central Colorado, taking in Boulder, Fort Collins, and Longmont, as well as the surrounding mountain ski towns, including Vail, Grand Lake and Idaho Springs. The district was made slightly larger during redistricting, and it is now based in the north-central part of the state rather than just west of Denver. The incumbent was Democrat Joe Neguse, who was re-elected with 61.5% of the vote in 2020. He was running for re-election.

=== Democratic primary ===
==== Candidates ====
===== Nominee =====
- Joe Neguse, incumbent U.S. representative

==== Endorsements ====
Joe Neguse

Organizations

- Democracy for America
- Giffords
- League of Conservation Voters
- Planned Parenthood Action Fund
- Progressive Democrats of America
- Sierra Club

==== Results ====
Democratic primary results
Party	Candidate	Votes	%
Democratic	Joe Neguse (incumbent)	91,793	100.0
Total votes		91,793	100.0

=== Republican primary ===
==== Candidates ====
===== Nominee =====
- Marshall Dawson

==== Results ====
Republican primary results
Party	Candidate	Votes	%
Republican	Marshall Dawson	43,164	100.0
Total votes		43,164	100.0

=== General election ===
==== Predictions ====
Source	Ranking	As of
The Cook Political Report	Solid D	November 29, 2021
Inside Elections	Solid D	November 22, 2021
Sabato's Crystal Ball	Safe D	November 17, 2021
Politico	Solid D	April 5, 2022
RCP	Safe D	June 9, 2022
Fox News	Solid D	July 11, 2022
DDHQ	Solid D	July 20, 2022
538	Solid D	June 30, 2022
The Economist	Safe D	September 28, 2022

==== Results ====
2022 Colorado's 2nd congressional district election
Party	Candidate	Votes	%
Democratic	Joe Neguse (incumbent)	244,107	69.98
Republican	Marshall Dawson	97,700	28.01
Center	Steve Yurash	2,876	0.82
American Constitution	Gary L. Nation	2,188	0.62
Unity	Tim Wolf	1,968	0.56
Total votes		348,839	100.00
Democratic hold			

===== By county =====
County	Joe Neguse Democratic		Marshall Dawson Republican		Steve Yurash Colorado Center		Gary L. Nation American Constitution		Tim Wolf Unity		Margin		Total
County	Votes	%	Votes	%	Votes	%	Votes	%	Votes	%	Votes	%	Total
Boulder	128,480	78.36%	32,635	19.90%	1,190	0.73%	837	0.51%	819	0.50%	95,845	58.46%	163,961
Clear Creek	2,962	57.92%	2,015	39.40%	35	0.68%	53	1.04%	49	0.96%	947	18.52%	5,114
Eagle	10,885	61.86%	6,376	36.24%	133	0.76%	101	0.57%	100	0.57%	4,509	25.63%	17,595
Gilpin	1,911	56.74%	1,368	40.62%	32	0.95%	34	1.01%	23	0.68%	543	16.12%	3,368
Grand	3,903	49.62%	3,776	48.01%	39	0.50%	87	1.11%	60	0.76%	127	1.61%	7,865
Jackson	121	18.17%	528	79.28%	3	0.45%	10	1.50%	4	0.60%	-407	-61.11%	666
Jefferson	651	58.86%	421	38.07%	10	0.90%	14	1.27%	10	0.90%	230	20.80%	1,106
Larimer	71,160	64.03%	37,415	33.67%	1,114	1.00%	789	0.71%	654	0.59%	33,745	30.36%	111,132
Routt	8,410	62.40%	4,760	35.32%	125	0.93%	84	0.62%	98	0.73%	3,650	27.08%	13,477
Summit	9,788	70.14%	3,864	27.69%	103	0.74%	105	0.75%	95	0.68%	5,924	42.45%	13,955
Weld	5,836	55.06%	4,542	42.85%	92	0.87%	74	0.70%	56	0.53%	1,294	12.21%	10,600

== District 3 ==
2022 Colorado's 3rd congressional district election
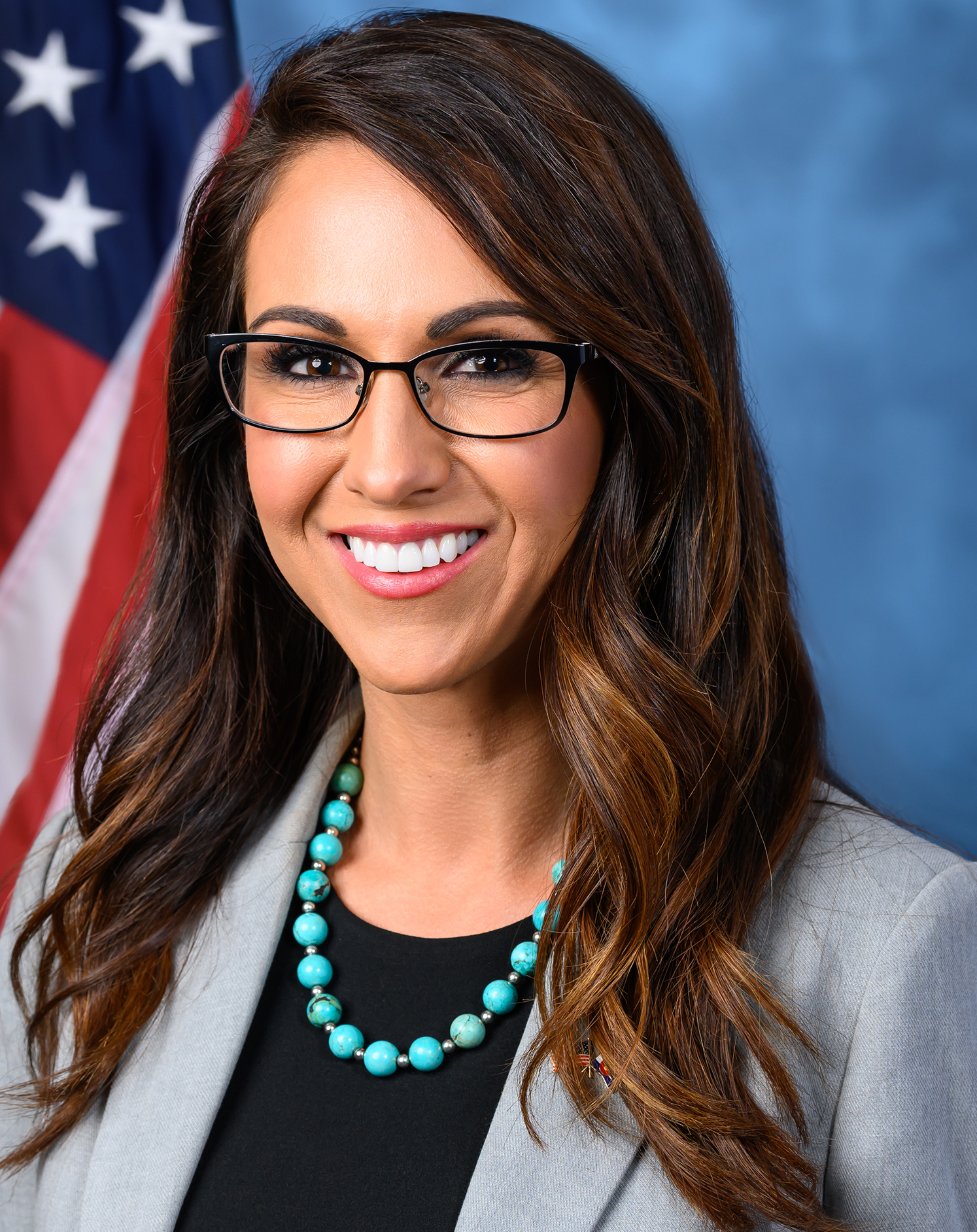

Nominee	Lauren Boebert	Adam Frisch
Party	Republican	Democratic
Popular vote	163,832	163,278
Percentage	50.06%	49.89%
- Boebert: 50–60% 60–70% 70–80% 80–90% >90% Frisch: 40–50% 50–60% 60–70% 70–80% 80–90% >90% No votes
U.S. Representative before election
Lauren Boebert
Republican
Elected U.S. Representative
Lauren Boebert
Republican

The 3rd district encompasses the Colorado Western Slope, including the cities of Montrose, Pueblo, and Grand Junction. Redistricting made the district slightly safer for the incumbent, Republican Lauren Boebert, who was elected with 51.4% of the vote in 2020. The district absorbs part of the old 4th district. She ran for re-election. Under the new district lines, the seat has a Cook PVI of R+7 and Donald Trump would have carried the district by 8 points. Despite this, Democrats very nearly flipped the seat, as Boebert defeated Adam Frisch by a razor-thin margin of 554 votes. This was the closest House race in 2022.

=== Republican primary ===
==== Candidates ====
===== Nominee =====
- Lauren Boebert, incumbent U.S. representative

===== Eliminated in primary =====
- Don Coram, state senator from the 6th district

===== Eliminated at Convention =====
- Marina Zimmerman, crane operator

===== Declined =====
- Tim Foster, president of Colorado Mesa University
- Matt Soper, state representative from the 54th district (running for re-election)

==== Endorsements ====
Lauren Boebert

U.S. executive branch officials

- Donald Trump, 45th president of the United States (2017–2021)

Newspapers and other media

- Colorado Springs Gazette

Organizations

- House Freedom Fund
- Turning Point Action
Don Coram

Newspapers and other media

- Durango Herald

==== Debates and forums ====
2022 CO-03 Republican primary debates and forums
No.	Date	Host	Moderator	Link	Participants	
P Participant A Absent N Non-invitee I Invitee W Withdrawn						
P Participant A Absent N Non-invitee I Invitee W Withdrawn					Boebert	Coram
1	May 26, 2022		Dave Woodruff		P	P

==== Results ====
Results by county Boebert: 50–60%; 60–70%; 70–80%; 80–90%; Coram: 50–60%; 60–70%; 70–80%

Republican primary results
Party	Candidate	Votes	%
Republican	Lauren Boebert (incumbent)	86,322	66.0
Republican	Don Coram	44,486	34.0
Total votes		130,808	100.0

=== Democratic primary ===
==== Candidates ====
===== Nominee =====
- Adam Frisch, former Aspen city councilman

===== Eliminated in primary =====
- Sol Sandoval, community organizer
- Alex Walker, entrepreneur

===== Did not qualify =====
- Debby Burnett, veterinarian
- Naziha Karima In'am Hadil
- Kellie Rhodes, rancher and public servant
- Root Routledge, U.S. Air Force veteran and candidate for this seat in 2020
- Donald Valdez, state representative from the 62nd district and candidate for this seat in 2020
- Colin Wilhelm, attorney and candidate for state house in 2020
- Scott Yates

===== Withdrew =====
- Colin Buerger
- Kerry Donovan, president pro tempore of the Colorado Senate from the 5th district
- Susan Martinez, nurse assistant and activist
- Gregg Smith, U.S. Marine Corps veteran and former adviser to Blackwater CEO Erik Prince

===== Declined =====
- Diane Mitsch Bush, former state representative from the 26th district and nominee for this district in 2018 and 2020 (endorsed Sandoval)
- Leroy Garcia, former president of the Colorado Senate from the 3rd district
- Dylan Roberts, state representative from the 26th district (running for state senate)

==== Endorsements ====
Sol Sandoval

State legislators

- Polly Baca, former state senator from the 25th district and former chair of the Colorado Democratic Party
- Diane Mitsch Bush, former state representative from the 26th district and nominee for this district in 2018 and 2020

Organizations

- Working Families Party

==== Debates and forums ====
2022 CO-03 Democratic primary debates and forums
No.	Date	Host	Moderator	Link	Participants		
P Participant A Absent N Non-invitee I Invitee W Withdrawn							
P Participant A Absent N Non-invitee I Invitee W Withdrawn					Frisch	Sandoval	Walker
1	May 25, 2022	Mesa County Democratic Party			P	P	P

==== Results ====
Results by county Frisch: 30–40%; 40–50%; 50–60%; 60–70%; 70–80%; Sandoval: 40–50%; 50–60%; 60–70%; 70–80%; Tie

Democratic primary results
Party	Candidate	Votes	%
Democratic	Adam Frisch	25,751	42.4
Democratic	Sol Sandoval	25,462	41.9
Democratic	Alex Walker	9,504	15.7
Total votes		60,717	100.0

=== Independents ===
==== Candidates ====
===== Filed paperwork =====
- Kristin Skowronski

=== General election ===
==== Debate ====
2022 Colorado's 3rd congressional district debate
No.	Date	Host	Moderator	Link	Republican	Democratic
Key: P Participant A Absent N Not invited I Invited W Withdrawn						
Key: P Participant A Absent N Not invited I Invited W Withdrawn					Lauren Boebert	Adam Frisch
1	Sep. 19, 2022	Club Twenty	Edie Sunn		P	P

==== Predictions ====
Source	Ranking	As of
The Cook Political Report	Solid R	November 29, 2021
Inside Elections	Solid R	May 20, 2022
Sabato's Crystal Ball	Likely R	November 17, 2021
Politico	Likely R	April 5, 2022
RCP	Likely R	June 9, 2022
Fox News	Likely R	July 11, 2022
DDHQ	Solid R	July 20, 2022
538	Solid R	June 30, 2022
The Economist	Safe R	September 28, 2022

==== Endorsements ====
Adam Frisch (D)

State officials

- Don Coram, state senator from the 6th District (2017–2023) (Republican)
- Russ George, speaker of the Colorado House of Representatives (1999–2000) and state representative from the 57th District (1993–2000) (Republican)

Newspapers

- Grand Junction Daily Sentinel

Organizations

- Forward Party

==== Polling ====
Poll source	Date(s) administered	Sample size (Note: Key: A – all adults RV – registered voters LV – likely voters V – unclear)	Margin of error	Lauren Boebert (R)	Adam Frisch (D)	Undecided
Center Street PAC (D)	Sep 30 – Oct 6, 2022	144 (RV)	± 5.2%	40%	45%	15%
Keating Research (D) (Note: This poll was sponsored by Frisch's campaign.)	Sep 28 – Oct 2, 2022	500 (LV)	± 4.4%	47%	45%	8%
Keating Research (D)	Jul 21–25, 2022	550 (LV)	± 4.2%	49%	42%	9%

Hypothetical polling

Lauren Boebert vs. generic opponent

Poll source	Date(s) administered	Sample size	Margin of error	Lauren Boebert (R)	Generic Opponent	Undecided
Keating Research (D)	July 21–25, 2022	550 (LV)	± 4.2%	45%	48%	7%

==== Results ====
Republican incumbent Lauren Boebert faced a strong challenge from former Aspen city councilman and businessman Adam Frisch who led on election day. Despite many prediction sites like The Cook Political Report giving the race a rating of "Solid R" up to election day, and very little support from national Democrats, this would become the closest race of the cycle. Nate Silver of FiveThirtyEight gave Boebert a 97% chance of winning and most projections showed Boebert defeating Frisch by a margin of nearly 15%. However, on election night, Frisch led Boebert with over 90% of votes counted. Over time the vote would narrow, with at one point Frisch leading by only 60 votes. Boebert took the lead two days after the election, though confusion would start to grow as to how many outstanding votes would be left due to military absentee ballots among other errors with vote counting. Although the close margin triggered an automatic recount, Frisch conceded the race on November 17 after all overseas, military and provisional ballots were counted, as he acknowledged that a recount was very unlikely to overturn Boebert's lead. On December 12, Secretary of State Jena Griswold announced that the results of the recount showed minimal change, with Boebert losing 3 votes and Frisch gaining 1.

2022 Colorado's 3rd congressional district election
Party	Candidate	Votes	%
Republican	Lauren Boebert (incumbent)	163,839	50.06
Democratic	Adam Frisch	163,293	49.89
Write-in		153	0.05
Total votes		327,285	100.00
Republican hold			

===== By county =====
County	Lauren Boebert Republican		Adam Frisch Democratic		Write-in		Margin		Total
County	Votes	%	Votes	%	Votes	%	Votes	%	Total
Alamosa	2,904	49.46%	2,966	50.51%	2	0.03%	-62	-1.06%	5,872
Archuleta	4,197	53.98%	3,574	45.97%	4	0.05%	623	8.01%	7,775
Conejos	1,790	52.93%	1,592	47.07%	0	0.00%	198	5.85%	3,382
Costilla	546	32.93%	1,113	67.07%	0	0.00%	-567	-34.14%	1,659
Delta	10,173	64.45%	5,603	35.50%	9	0.06%	4,570	28.95%	15,785
Dolores	960	74.02%	337	25.98%	0	0.00%	623	48.03%	1,297
Eagle	1,177	28.18%	2,997	71.77%	2	0.05%	-1,820	-43.58%	4,176
Garfield	10,325	42.87%	13,752	57.10%	8	0.03%	-3,427	-14.23%	24,085
Gunnison	2,760	30.72%	6,219	69.22%	5	0.06%	-3,459	-38.50%	8,984
Hinsdale	276	53.70%	238	46.30%	0	0.00%	38	7.39%	514
Huerfano	1,793	47.35%	1,994	52.65%	0	0.00%	-201	-5.31%	3,787
La Plata	10,900	36.88%	18,648	63.09%	11	0.04%	-7,748	-26.21%	29,559
Las Animas	3,385	51.31%	3,210	48.66%	2	0.03%	175	2.65%	6,597
Mesa	41,884	57.61%	30,765	42.32%	53	0.07%	11,119	15.29%	72,702
Mineral	392	56.32%	304	43.68%	0	0.00%	88	12.64%	696
Moffat	4,278	79.56%	1,094	20.35%	5	0.09%	3,184	59.22%	5,377
Montezuma	7,134	57.30%	5,313	42.67%	3	0.02%	1,821	14.63%	12,450
Montrose	12,978	62.96%	7,627	37.00%	9	0.04%	5,351	25.96%	20,614
Otero	4,174	58.45%	2,961	41.46%	6	0.08%	1,213	16.99%	7,141
Ouray	1,281	36.39%	2,239	63.61%	0	0.00%	-958	-27.22%	3,520
Pitkin	1,975	20.74%	7,543	79.22%	3	0.03%	-5,568	-58.48%	9,521
Pueblo	31,104	46.75%	35,394	53.20%	28	0.04%	-4,290	-6.45%	66,526
Rio Blanco	2,489	82.34%	534	17.66%	0	0.00%	1,955	64.67%	3,023
Rio Grande	2,800	56.90%	2,118	43.04%	3	0.06%	682	13.87%	4,921
Saguache	1,162	42.33%	1,583	57.67%	0	0.00%	-421	-15.34%	2,745
San Juan	167	31.16%	369	68.84%	0	0.00%	-202	-37.69%	536
San Miguel	835	20.66%	3,206	79.32%	1	0.02%	-2,371	-58.66%	4,042

== District 4 ==
2022 Colorado's 4th congressional district election
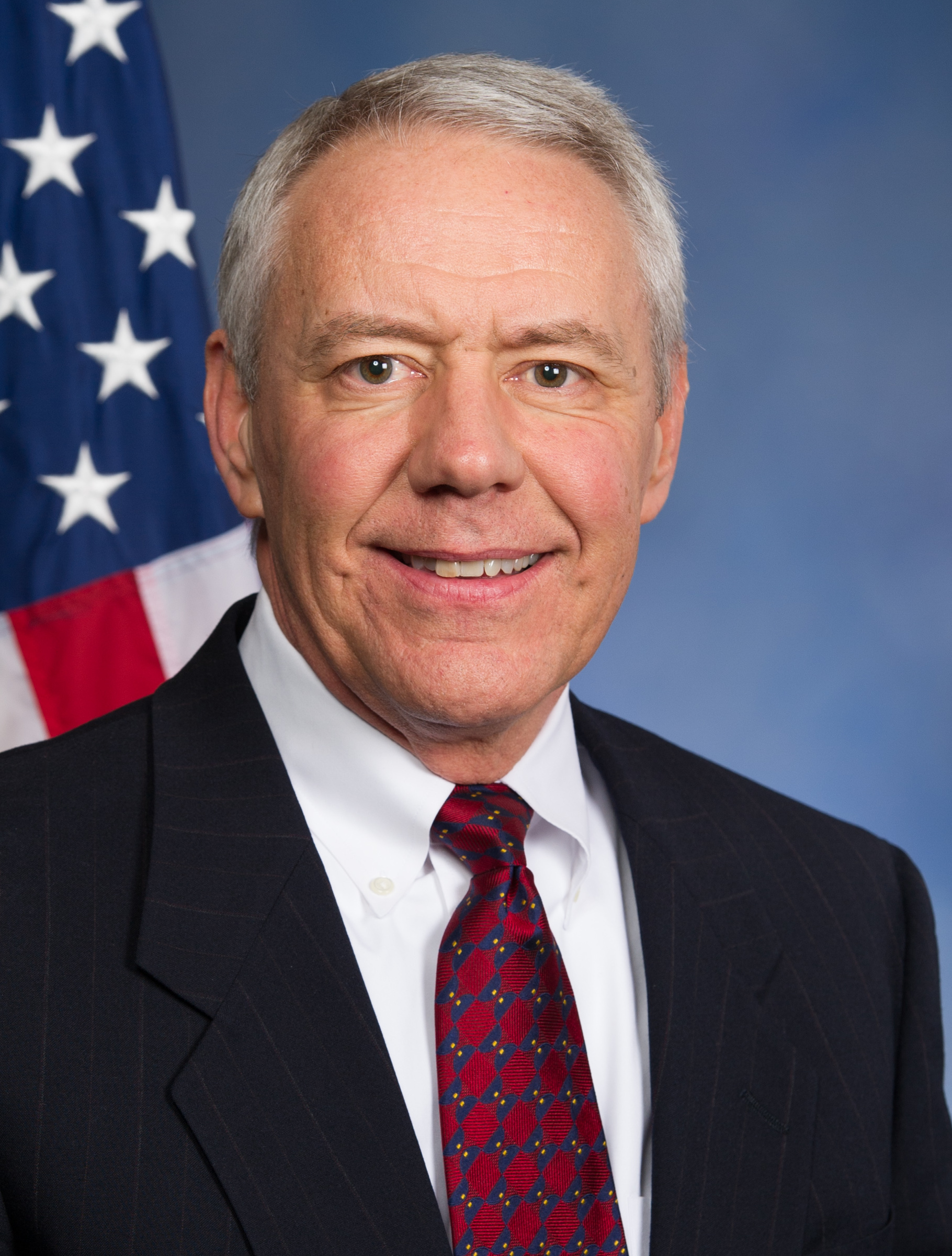

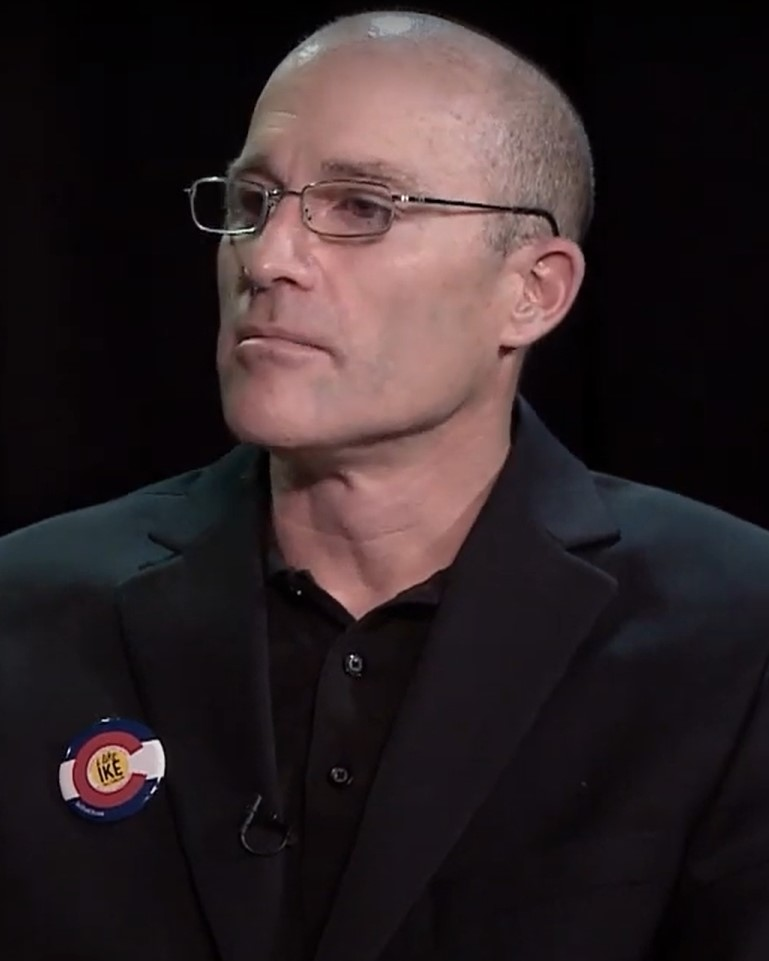
Nominee	Ken Buck	Ike McCorkle
Party	Republican	Democratic
Popular vote	216,024	129,619
Percentage	60.94%	36.56%
- Buck: 40–50% 50–60% 60–70% 70–80% 80–90% >90% McCorkle: 40–50% 50–60% 60–70% No votes
U.S. Representative before election
Ken Buck
Republican
Elected U.S. Representative
Ken Buck
Republican

The 4th district encompasses rural eastern Colorado and the southern Denver exurbs, including Castle Rock and Parker. The incumbent was Republican Ken Buck, who was re-elected with 60.1% of the vote in 2020. The old 4th district ceded parts to the new 3rd district. Buck was running for re-election.

=== Republican primary ===
==== Candidates ====
===== Nominee =====
- Ken Buck, incumbent U.S. representative

===== Eliminated in primary =====
- Bob Lewis

==== Endorsements ====
Ken Buck

Organizations

- American Conservative Union
- Family Research Council Action PAC

Newspapers and other media

- Colorado Springs Gazette

==== Results ====
Republican primary results
Party	Candidate	Votes	%
Republican	Ken Buck (incumbent)	90,070	74.0
Republican	Robert Lewis	31,585	26.0
Total votes		121,655	100.0

=== Democratic primary ===
==== Candidates ====
===== Nominee =====
- Ike McCorkle, U.S. Marine Corps veteran and nominee for this district in 2020

==== Results ====
Democratic primary results
Party	Candidate	Votes	%
Democratic	Ike McCorkle	42,238	100.0
Total votes		42,238	100.0

=== Independents ===
==== Candidates ====
===== Filed paperwork =====
- Ryan McGonigal

=== General election ===
==== Predictions ====
Source	Ranking	As of
The Cook Political Report	Solid R	November 29, 2021
Inside Elections	Solid R	November 22, 2021
Sabato's Crystal Ball	Safe R	November 17, 2021
Politico	Solid R	April 5, 2022
RCP	Safe R	June 9, 2022
Fox News	Solid R	July 11, 2022
DDHQ	Solid R	July 20, 2022
538	Solid R	June 30, 2022
The Economist	Safe R	September 28, 2022

==== Results ====
2022 Colorado's 4th congressional district election
Party	Candidate	Votes	%
Republican	Ken Buck (incumbent)	216,024	60.94%
Democratic	Ike McCorkle	129,619	36.56%
American Constitution	Ryan McGonigal	8,870	2.50%
Total votes		354,513	100.00%
Republican hold			

===== By county =====
County	Ken Buck Republican		Ike McCorkle Democratic		Ryan McGonigal American Constitution		Margin		Total
County	Votes	%	Votes	%	Votes	%	Votes	%	Total
Adams	4,185	75.41%	1,192	21.48%	173	3.12%	2,993	53.93%	5,550
Arapahoe	7,771	51.30%	6,975	46.04%	403	2.66%	796	5.25%	15,149
Baca	1,418	70.47%	239	13.67%	91	5.21%	1,179	67.45%	1,748
Bent	1,247	68.82%	494	27.26%	71	3.92%	753	41.56%	1,812
Cheyenne	814	89.75%	75	8.27%	18	1.98%	739	81.48%	907
Crowley	994	73.09%	283	20.81%	83	6.10%	711	52.28%	1,360
Douglas	104,260	56.13%	77,764	41.87%	3,716	2.00%	26,496	14.27%	185,740
El Paso	3,217	80.16%	613	15.28%	183	4.56%	2,604	64.89%	4,013
Elbert	12,172	75.89%	3,324	20.73%	542	3.38%	8,848	55.17%	16,038
Kiowa	670	89.33%	60	8.00%	20	2.67%	610	81.33%	750
Kit Carson	2,552	85.24%	356	11.89%	86	2.87%	2,196	73.35%	2,994
Larimer	27,871	52.49%	23,705	44.64%	1,524	2.87%	4,166	7.85%	53,100
Lincoln	1,757	83.91%	272	12.99%	65	3.10%	1,485	70.92%	2,094
Logan	6,409	78.61%	1,449	17.77%	295	3.62%	4,960	60.84%	8,153
Morgan	7,653	75.97%	2,137	21.21%	284	2.82%	5,516	54.75%	10,074
Phillips	1,614	83.15%	272	14.01%	55	2.83%	1,342	69.14%	1,941
Prowers	3,200	75.28%	907	21.34%	144	3.39%	2,293	53.94%	4,251
Sedgwick	915	80.12%	196	17.16%	31	2.71%	719	62.96%	1,142
Washington	2,102	88.28%	203	8.53%	76	3.19%	1,899	79.76%	2,381
Weld	21,828	69.58%	8,648	27.57%	893	2.85%	13,180	42.02%	31,369
Yuma	3,375	85.51%	455	11.53%	117	2.96%	2,920	73.98%	3,947

== District 5 ==
2022 Colorado's 5th congressional district election
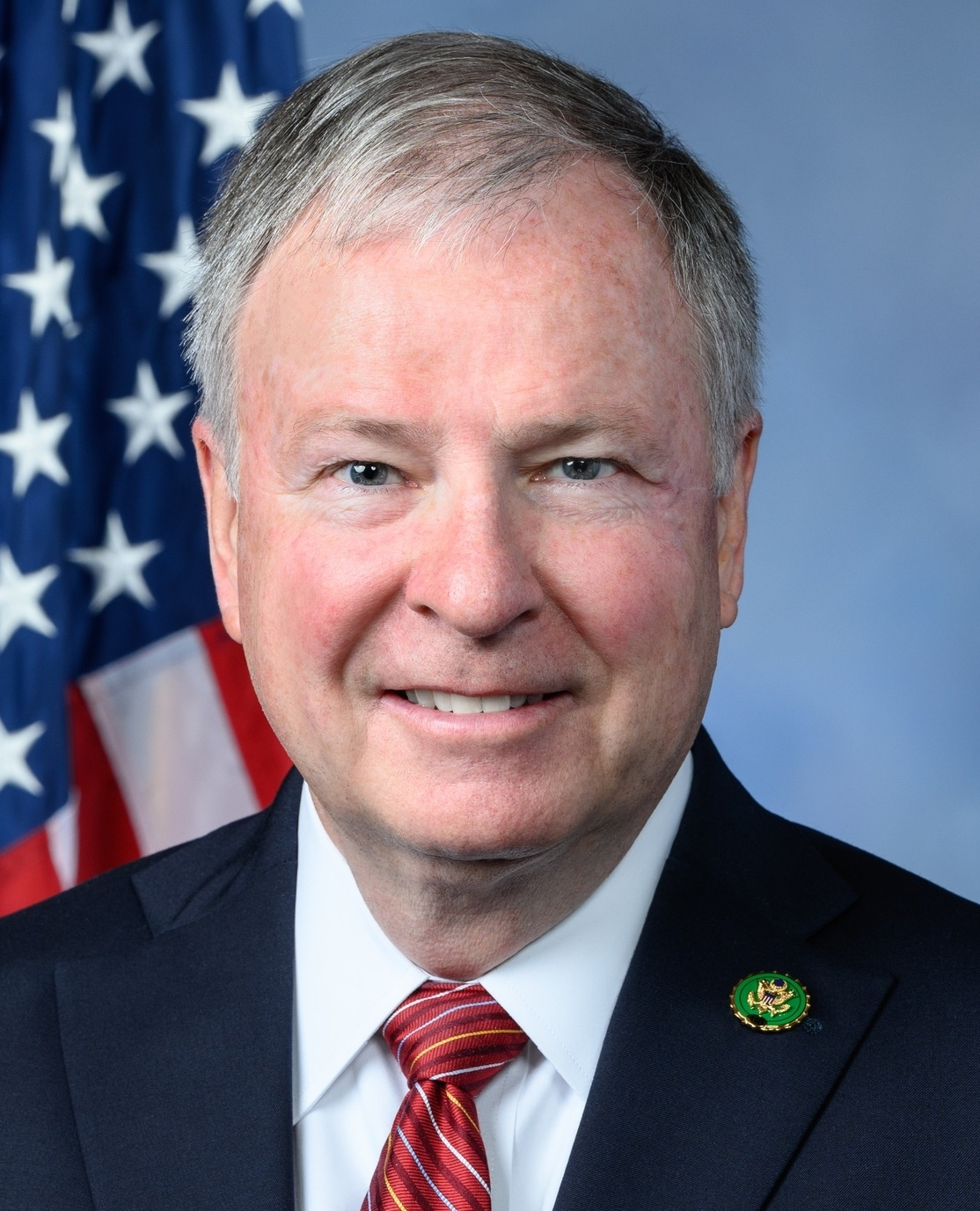

Nominee	Doug Lamborn	David Torres
Party	Republican	Democratic
Popular vote	155,528	111,978
Percentage	55.95%	40.29%
- Lamborn: 40–50% 50–60% 60–70% 70–80% 80–90% Torres: 40–50% 50–60% 60–70% 70–80% 80–90% No votes
U.S. Representative before election
Doug Lamborn
Republican
Elected U.S. Representative
Doug Lamborn
Republican

The 5th district is based in Colorado Springs and its suburbs, including Fountain, Black Forest, and Ellicott after previously being spread out over central Colorado. The incumbent was Republican Doug Lamborn, who was re-elected with 57.6% of the vote in 2020. He was running for re-election.

=== Republican primary ===
==== Candidates ====
===== Nominee =====
- Doug Lamborn, incumbent U.S. representative

===== Eliminated in primary =====
- Andrew Heaton, business owner
- Rebecca Keltie, U.S. Navy veteran and Unity nominee for this district in 2020
- Dave Williams, state representative from the 15th district and former vice-chairman of the El Paso County Republican Party

===== Did not qualify =====
- Christopher Mitchell, electrical engineer

==== Endorsements ====
Doug Lamborn

U.S. executive branch officials

- Mike Pompeo, 75th U.S. secretary of state (2018–2021) and former director of the Central Intelligence Agency (2017–2018)

U.S. representatives

- Jim Jordan, U.S. representative from Ohio's 4th congressional district (2007–)

Newspapers

- The Gazette
Dave Williams

U.S. representatives

- Tom Tancredo, former U.S. representative for Colorado's 6th congressional district (1999–2009)

Individuals

- Michelle Malkin, political commentator

==== Results ====
Republican primary results
Party	Candidate	Votes	%
Republican	Doug Lamborn (incumbent)	46,178	47.3
Republican	Dave Williams	32,669	33.5
Republican	Rebecca Keltie	12,631	12.9
Republican	Andrew Heaton	6,121	6.3
Total votes		97,599	100.0

=== Democratic primary ===
==== Candidates ====
===== Nominee =====
- David Torres, U.S. Air Force veteran

===== Eliminated in primary =====
- Michael Colombe

===== Did not qualify =====
- Orlondo Avion
- Jeremy Dowell, attorney

==== Results ====
Democratic primary results
Party	Candidate	Votes	%
Democratic	David Torres	24,413	54.7
Democratic	Michael C. Colombe	20,237	45.3
Total votes		44,650	100.0

=== General election ===
==== Predictions ====
Source	Ranking	As of
The Cook Political Report	Solid R	November 29, 2021
Inside Elections	Solid R	November 22, 2021
Sabato's Crystal Ball	Safe R	November 17, 2021
Politico	Likely R	April 5, 2022
RCP	Safe R	June 9, 2022
Fox News	Solid R	July 11, 2022
DDHQ	Solid R	July 20, 2022
538	Solid R	June 30, 2022
The Economist	Safe R	September 28, 2022

==== Results ====
2022 Colorado's 5th congressional district election
Party	Candidate	Votes	%
Republican	Doug Lamborn (incumbent)	155,528	55.95%
Democratic	David Torres	111,978	40.29%
Libertarian	Brian Flanagan	7,079	2.55%
American Constitution	Christopher Mitchell	3,370	1.21%
Independent	Matthew Feigenbaum	9	0.00%
Total votes		277,964	100.00%
Republican hold			

===== By county =====
County	Doug Lamborn Republican		David Torres Democratic		Brian Flanagan Libertarian		Christopher Mitchell American Constitution		Matthew Feigenbaum Independent (write-in)		Margin		Total
County	Votes	%	Votes	%	Votes	%	Votes	%	Votes	%	Votes	%	Total
El Paso	155,528	55.95%	111,978	40.29%	7,079	2.55%	3,370	1.21%	9	0.00%	43,550	15.67%	277,964

== District 6 ==
2022 Colorado's 6th congressional district election
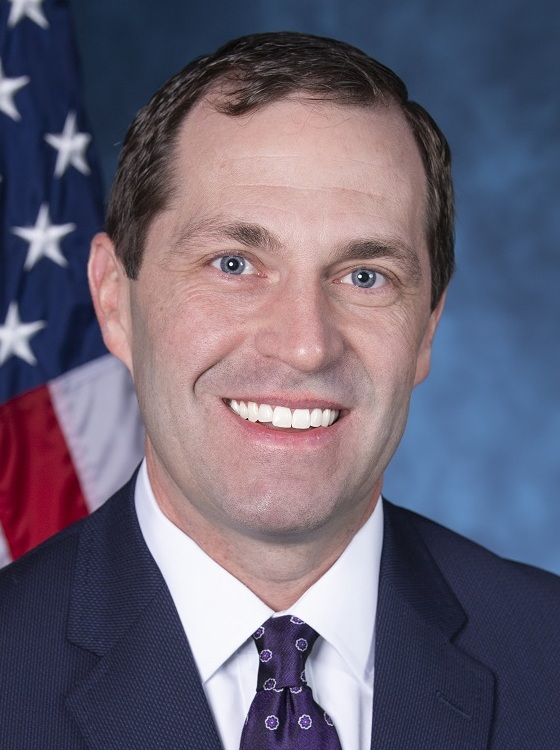

Nominee	Jason Crow	Steve Monahan
Party	Democratic	Republican
Popular vote	170,140	105,084
Percentage	60.60%	37.43%
- Crow: 40–50% 50–60% 60–70% 70–80% 80–90% Monahan: 40–50% 50–60% 60–70% 70–80% No votes
U.S. Representative before election
Jason Crow
Democratic
Elected U.S. Representative
Jason Crow
Democratic

The 6th district is based in the southern suburbs of the Denver metropolitan area including Aurora, Centennial, and Littleton. The incumbent was Democrat Jason Crow, who was re-elected with 57.1% of the vote in 2020.

=== Democratic primary ===
==== Candidates ====
===== Nominee =====
- Jason Crow, incumbent U.S. representative

==== Endorsements ====
Jason Crow

Organizations

- End Citizens United
- Giffords
- League of Conservation Voters
- NARAL Pro-Choice America
- New Politics
- Planned Parenthood Action Fund
- Sierra Club

==== Results ====
Democratic primary results
Party	Candidate	Votes	%
Democratic	Jason Crow (incumbent)	61,074	100.0
Total votes		61,074	100.0

=== Republican primary ===
==== Candidates ====
===== Nominee =====
- Steve Monahan

===== Declined =====
- Lora Thomas, Douglas County commissioner (running for Douglas County sheriff)

==== Results ====
Republican primary results
Party	Candidate	Votes	%
Republican	Steve Monahan	47,556	100.0
Total votes		47,556	100.0

=== Libertarian primary ===
==== Candidates ====
===== Nominee =====
- Eric Mulder, nominee for Arapahoe County sheriff in 2018

=== General election ===
==== Predictions ====
Source	Ranking	As of
The Cook Political Report	Solid D	November 29, 2021
Inside Elections	Solid D	November 22, 2021
Sabato's Crystal Ball	Safe D	November 17, 2021
Politico	Solid D	April 5, 2022
RCP	Safe D	June 9, 2022
Fox News	Solid D	July 11, 2022
DDHQ	Solid D	July 20, 2022
538	Solid D	June 30, 2022
The Economist	Safe D	September 28, 2022

==== Results ====
2022 Colorado's 6th congressional district election
Party	Candidate	Votes	%
Democratic	Jason Crow (incumbent)	170,140	60.60
Republican	Steve Monahan	105,084	37.43
Libertarian	Eric Mulder	5,531	1.97
Total votes		280,755	100.00
Democratic hold			

===== By county =====
County	Jason Crow Democratic		Steve Monahan Republican		Eric Mulder Libertarian		Margin		Total
County	Votes	%	Votes	%	Votes	%	Votes	%	Total
Adams	6,481	72.17%	2,265	25.22%	234	2.61%	4,216	46.95%	8,980
Arapahoe	145,415	61.63%	85,916	36.41%	4,612	1.95%	59,499	25.22%	235,943
Denver	476	78.16%	123	20.20%	10	1.64%	353	57.96%	609
Douglas	1,420	51.43%	1,309	47.41%	32	1.16%	111	4.02%	2,761
Jefferson	16,348	50.36%	15,471	47.66%	643	1.98%	877	2.70%	32,462

== District 7 ==
2022 Colorado's 7th congressional district election
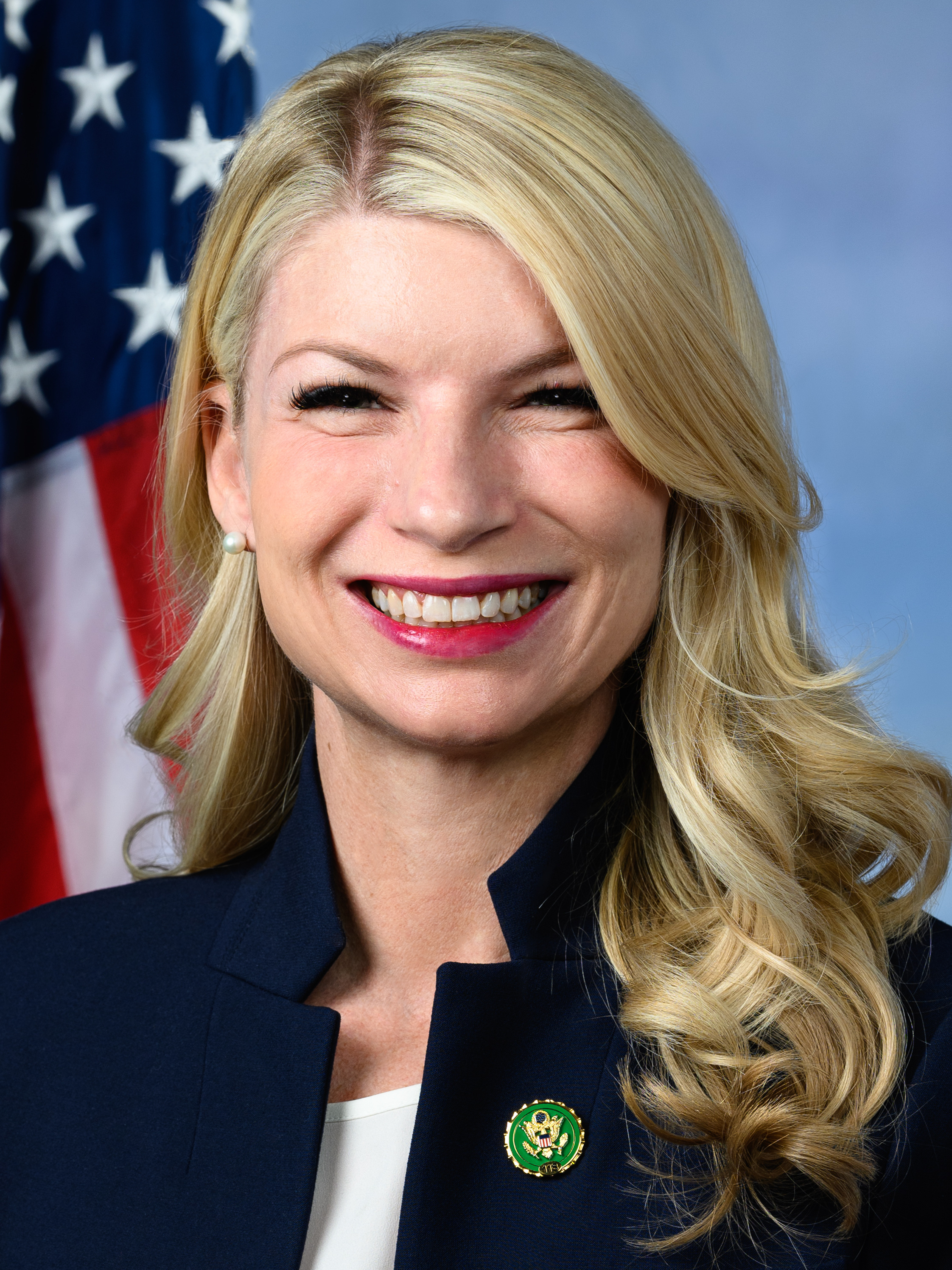

Nominee	Brittany Pettersen	Erik Aadland
Party	Democratic	Republican
Popular vote	204,984	150,509
Percentage	56.37%	41.39%
- Pettersen: 40–50% 50–60% 60–70% 70–80% 80–90% Aadland: 40–50% 50–60% 60–70% 70–80% No votes
U.S. Representative before election
Ed Perlmutter
Democratic
Elected U.S. Representative
Brittany Pettersen
Democratic

The 7th district includes the western suburbs of Denver and central Colorado, including Arvada, Lakewood, Broomfield, and Cañon City, but also a large portion of central Colorado. The incumbent was Democrat Ed Perlmutter, who was re-elected with 59.1% of the vote in 2020. Perlmutter announced that he would retire at the end of his term, creating an open seat.

=== Democratic primary ===
==== Candidates ====
===== Nominee =====
- Brittany Pettersen, state senator from the 22nd district

===== Did not qualify =====
- Kyle Faust
- Julius B. Mopper

===== Declined =====
- Lesley Dahlkemper, Jefferson County commissioner
- Jessie Danielson, state senator from the 20th district (endorsed Pettersen)
- Ed Perlmutter, incumbent U.S. representative (endorsed Pettersen)
- Brianna Titone, state representative from the 27th district (endorsed Pettersen)

==== Results ====
Democratic primary results
Party	Candidate	Votes	%
Democratic	Brittany Pettersen	71,497	100.0
Total votes		71,497	100.0

=== Republican primary ===
==== Candidates ====
===== Nominee =====
- Erik Aadland, Army veteran

===== Eliminated in primary =====
- Laurel Imer, small business owner and candidate for state house in 2020
- Timothy Reichert, economist, businessman

==== Did not qualify ====
- Carl Anderson, vice chair of the Teller County Republican Party
- Brad Dempsey, lawyer

==== Endorsements ====
Laurel Imer

U.S. representatives

- Tom Tancredo, former U.S. representative for Colorado's 6th congressional district (1999–2009)

State legislators

- Dave Williams, state representative from the 15th district (2017–present)

Individuals

- Joe Arpaio, former sheriff of Maricopa County (1993–2017)
Timothy Reichert

U.S. senators

- Hank Brown, former U.S. senator from Colorado (1991–1997)

U.S. representatives

- Bob Beauprez, former U.S. representative from Colorado's 7th congressional district (2003–2007)

Newspapers

- Denver Gazette

==== Results ====
Republican primary results
Party	Candidate	Votes	%
Republican	Erik Aadland	43,469	47.9
Republican	Timothy Reichert	32,583	35.9
Republican	Laurel Imer	14,665	16.2
Total votes		90,717	100.0

=== General election ===
==== Predictions ====
Source	Ranking	As of
The Cook Political Report	Likely D	January 26, 2022
Inside Elections	Likely D	November 22, 2021
Sabato's Crystal Ball	Lean D	July 28, 2022
Politico	Lean D	November 7, 2022
RCP	Lean D	June 9, 2022
Fox News	Lean D	August 22, 2022
DDHQ	Lean D	July 20, 2022
538	Likely D	June 30, 2022
The Economist	Likely D	September 28, 2022

==== Endorsements ====
Brittany Pettersen (D)

U.S. senators

- Michael Bennet, U.S. senator from Colorado (2009–present)

U.S. representatives

- Jason Crow, U.S. representative for Colorado's 6th congressional district (2019–present)
- Diana DeGette, U.S. representative for Colorado's 1st congressional district (1997–present)
- Joe Neguse, U.S. representative for Colorado's 2nd congressional district (2019–present)
- Ed Perlmutter, U.S. representative for Colorado's 7th congressional district (2007–present)

Organizations

- American Israel Public Affairs Committee
- EMILY's List
- Human Rights Campaign PAC
- League of Conservation Voters
- NARAL Pro-Choice America
- New Democrat Coalition Action Fund
- Planned Parenthood Action Fund
Erik Aadland (R)

U.S. senators

- Cory Gardner, former U.S. senator from Colorado (2015-2021)

U.S. representatives

- Tom Tancredo, former U.S. representative for Colorado's 6th congressional district (1999–2009)

Organizations

- Tea Party Express

==== Polling ====
Poll source	Date(s) administered	Sample size	Margin of error	Brittany Pettersen (D)	Erik Aadland (R)	Undecided
RMG Research	July 24–30, 2022	400 (LV)	± 4.9%	44%	41%	13%
Meeting Street Insights (R) (Note: Poll sponsored by the Congressional Leadership Fund)	July 18–21, 2022	400 (LV)	± 4.9%	44%	42%	13%

Hypothetical polling

Generic Democrat vs. generic Republican

Poll source	Date(s) administered	Sample size	Margin of error	Generic Democrat	Generic Republican	Undecided
Meeting Street Insights (R)	July 18–21, 2022	400 (LV)	± 4.9%	45%	44%	11%

==== Results ====
2022 Colorado's 7th congressional district election
Party	Candidate	Votes	%
Democratic	Brittany Pettersen	204,984	56.37
Republican	Erik Aadland	150,510	41.39
Libertarian	Ross Klopf	6,187	1.70
Unity	Critter Milton	1,828	0.50
Independent	JP Lujan (write-in)	92	0.02
Total votes		363,601	100.00
Democratic hold			

===== By county =====
County	Brittany Pettersen Democratic		Erik Aadland Republican		Ross Klopf Libertarian		Critter Milton Unity		JP Lujan Independent (write-in)		Margin		Total
County	Votes	%	Votes	%	Votes	%	Votes	%	Votes	%	Votes	%	Total
Adams	822	67.10%	376	30.69%	19	1.55%	7	0.57%	1	0.08%	446	36.41%	1,225
Broomfield	23,305	62.94%	13,016	35.15%	557	1.50%	143	0.39%	8	0.02%	10,289	27.79%	37,029
Chaffee	6,418	54.93%	5,002	42.81%	209	1.79%	55	0.47%	8	0.07%	1,416	25.63%	11,684
Custer	952	29.02%	2,253	68.67%	65	1.98%	11	0.34%	0	0.00%	-1,301	-39.65%	3,281
El Paso	177	54.80%	138	42.72%	7	2.17%	1	0.31%	0	0.00%	39	12.07%	323
Fremont	5,962	29.85%	13,317	67.34%	363	1.84%	129	0.65%	4	0.02%	-7,355	-37.19%	19,775
Jefferson	157,423	59.64%	100,712	38.15%	4,433	1.68%	1,334	0.51%	66	0.03%	56,711	21.48%	263,968
Lake	1,728	58.98%	1,094	37.34%	79	2.70%	29	0.99%	0	0.00%	634	21.64%	2,930
Park	4,095	41.11%	5,570	55.92%	230	2.31%	62	0.62%	4	0.04%	-1,475	-14.81%	9,961
Teller	4,102	30.58%	9,032	67.32%	225	1.68%	57	0.42%	4	0.03%	-4,930	-36.75%	13,416

== District 8 ==
2022 Colorado's 8th congressional district election
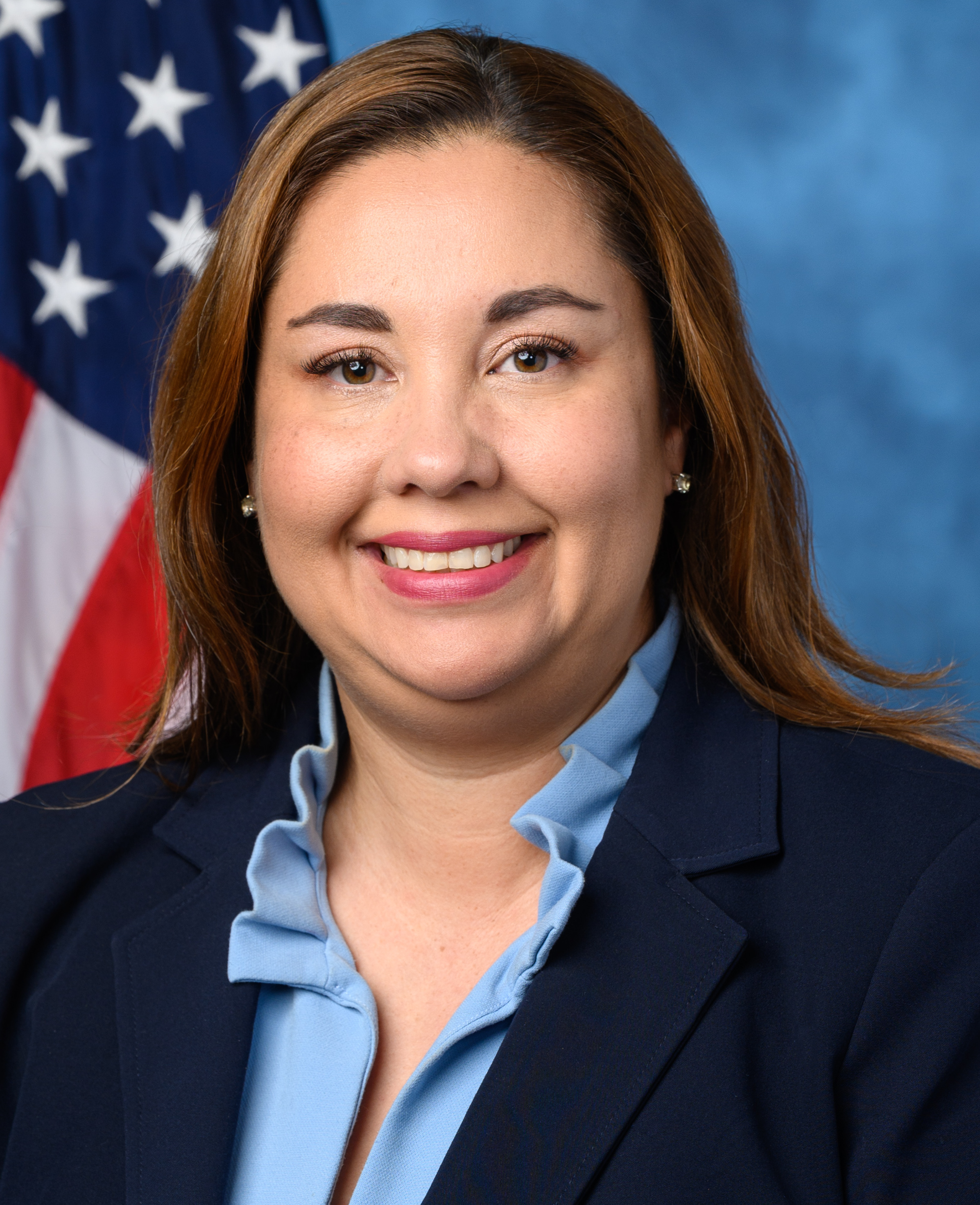

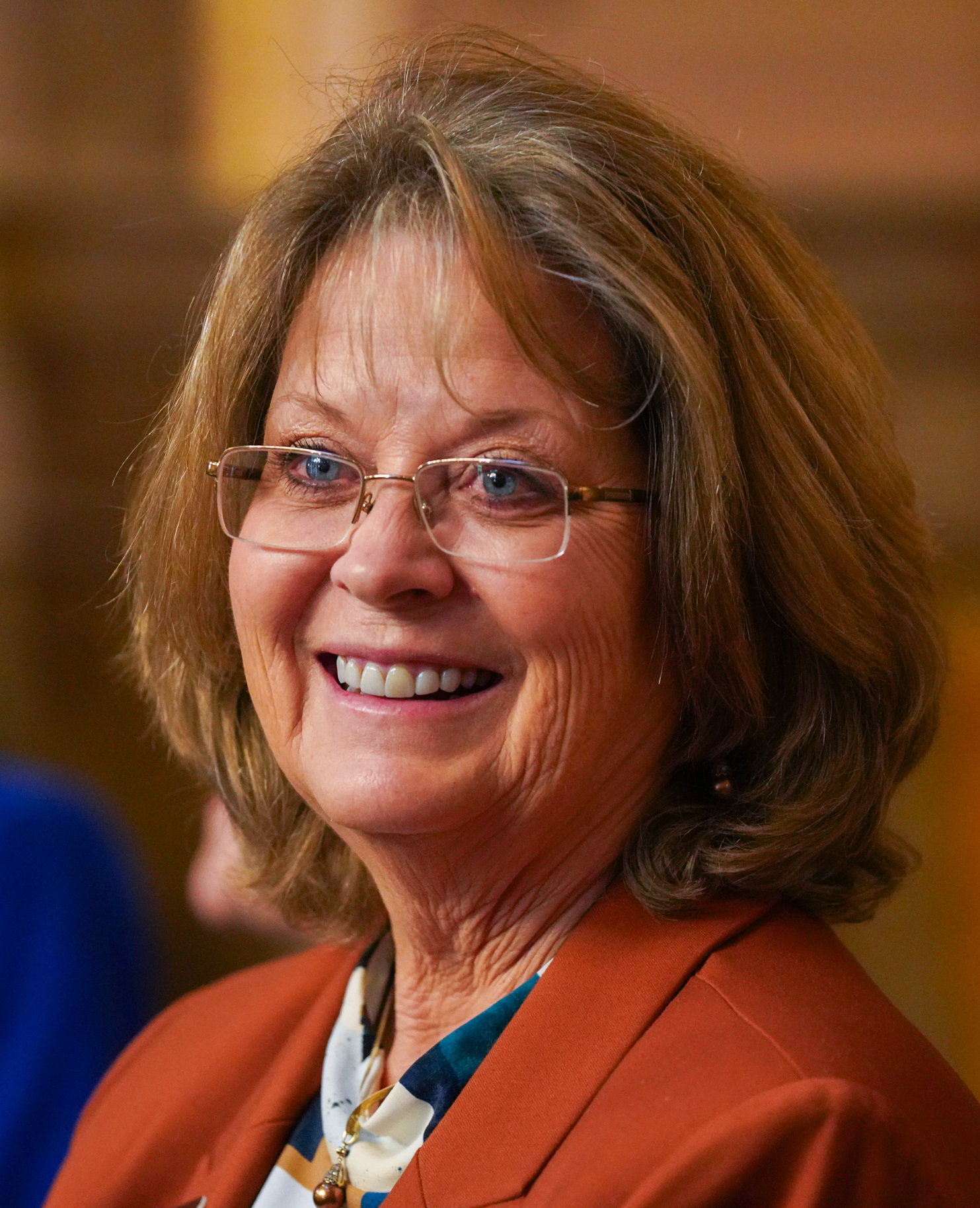
Nominee	Yadira Caraveo	Barbara Kirkmeyer
Party	Democratic	Republican
Popular vote	114,377	112,745
Percentage	48.36%	47.67%
- Caraveo: 40–50% 50–60% 60–70% 70–80% Kirkmeyer: 40–50% 50–60% 60–70% 70–80% 80–90% >90% No votes
U.S. Representative before election
None
(New district)
Elected U.S. Representative
Yadira Caraveo
Democratic

The 8th district is a new district created after the 2020 census. It includes the northern Front Range cities and surrounding Denver communities, including Thornton, Brighton, Johnstown, and Greeley.

Democratic nominee Yadira Caraveo won the open seat by just 0.7 percentage points. This was largely seen as an upset win, as polls almost unanimously had Republican nominee Barbara Kirkmeyer in the lead.

=== Democratic primary ===
==== Candidates ====
===== Nominee =====
- Yadira Caraveo, state representative from the 31st district

===== Did not qualify =====
- Johnny Humphrey, gay rights advocate
- Chaz Tedesco, Adams County commissioner

===== Declined =====
- Joe Salazar, former state representative from the 31st district and candidate for attorney general in 2018 (ran for state senate)
- Brianna Titone, state representative from the 27th district (endorsed Caraveo)
- Faith Winter, state senator from the 24th district (endorsed Caraveo)

==== Endorsements ====
Yadira Caraveo

U.S. senators

- Michael Bennet, U.S. senator from Colorado (2009–present)
- John Hickenlooper, U.S. senator from Colorado (2021–present)

U.S. representatives

- Jason Crow, U.S. representative from Colorado's 6th congressional district (2019–present)
- Diana DeGette, U.S. representative from Colorado's 1st congressional district (1997–present)
- Katie Porter, U.S. representative from California's 45th congressional district (2019–present)

State legislators

- 7 current and former state senators
- 28 current and former state representatives

Local officials

- Jennifer Arndt, mayor of Fort Collins

Organizations

- 314 Action
- American Israel Public Affairs Committee
- EMILY's List
- End Citizens United
- Human Rights Campaign PAC
- Latino Victory
- League of Conservation Voters
- Let America Vote
- NARAL Pro-Choice America
- New Democrat Coalition Action Fund
- Planned Parenthood Action Fund

Newspapers

- The Denver Post
Chaz Tedesco

State legislators

- Joe Miklosi, former state representative (2009–2013)
- Andrew Romanoff, former speaker of the Colorado House of Representatives (2005–2009) and former state representative (2001–2009)
- Joe Salazar, former state representative (2013–2019)

Individuals

- Greg Boyd, former NFL player
- Randy Bryce, ironworker, activist, and former political candidate

Organizations

- International Association of Fire Fighters
- International Association of Sheet Metal, Air, Rail and Transportation Workers Local 9
- International Federation of Professional and Technical Engineers
- International Union of Bricklayers and Allied Craftworkers
- Pipefitters Local Union 208
- Retired Members Council of the Communication Workers of America 777
- United Steelworkers
- VoteVets.org

==== Results ====
Democratic primary results
Party	Candidate	Votes	%
Democratic	Yadira Caraveo	38,837	100.0
Total votes		38,837	100.0

=== Republican primary ===
==== Candidates ====
===== Nominee =====
- Barbara Kirkmeyer, state senator from the 23rd district

===== Eliminated in primary =====
- Tyler Allcorn, U.S. Army Special Forces veteran
- Jan Kulmann, mayor of Thornton
- Lori Saine, Weld County commissioner and former state representative from the 63rd district

===== Did not qualify =====
- Ryan Gonzalez
- Jewels Gray, professional photographer

==== Endorsements ====
Tyler Allcorn

U.S. executive branch officials

- Ryan Zinke, former United States secretary of the interior (2017–2019)
Barbara Kirkmeyer

Organizations

- Americans for Prosperity
- Tea Party Express (post primary)
- United States Chamber of Commerce (post primary)
Jan Kulmann

State senators

- John Cooke, state senator from the 13th district (2015–)
Lori Saine

U.S. representatives

- Tom Tancredo, former U.S. representative from Colorado's 6th congressional district (1999–2009)

State legislators

- Mark Baisley, state representative from the 39th district (2019–)
- Richard Holtorf, state representative from the 64th district (2019–)
- Kevin Lundberg, former state senator (2009–2019)
- Kim Ransom, state representative from the 44th district (2019–)
- Shane Sandridge, state representative from the 14th district (2019–)
- David Schultheis, former state senator (2007–2011)
- Matt Soper, state representative from the 54th district (2019–)

Individuals

- John Lott Jr., author and gun rights activist

==== Results ====
Republican primary results
Party	Candidate	Votes	%
Republican	Barbara Kirkmeyer	22,724	39.0
Republican	Jan Kulmann	13,398	23.0
Republican	Lori Saine	12,357	21.2
Republican	Tyler Allcorn	9,743	16.7
Total votes		58,222	100.0

=== Independents ===
==== Candidates ====
===== Filed paperwork =====
- Matthew Payette

=== General election ===
==== Debates and forums ====
2022 Colorado's 8th congressional district general election debates and forums
No.	Date	Host	Moderator	Link	Participants			
P Participant A Absent N Non-invitee I Invitee W Withdrawn								
P Participant A Absent N Non-invitee I Invitee W Withdrawn					Caraveo	Kirkmeyer	Long	Ward
1	October 13, 2022	9NEWS	Kyle Clark	YouTube	P	P	N	N

==== Predictions ====
Source	Ranking	As of
The Cook Political Report	Tossup	November 29, 2021
Inside Elections	Tilt R (flip)	November 3, 2022
Sabato's Crystal Ball	Lean R (flip)	November 2, 2022
Politico	Lean R (flip)	November 3, 2022
RCP	Lean R (flip)	June 9, 2022
Fox News	Lean R (flip)	November 1, 2022
DDHQ	Lean R (flip)	October 18, 2022
538	Likely R (flip)	October 20, 2022
The Economist	Lean R (flip)	November 5, 2022

==== Polling ====
Graphical summary

Poll source	Date(s) administered	Sample size	Margin of error	Yadira Caraveo (D)	Barbara Kirkmeyer (R)	Undecided
Global Strategy Group (D) (Note: This poll was sponsored by Caraveo's campaign.)	October 11–16, 2022	600 (LV)	± 4.0%	44%	46%	12%
Global Strategy Group (D)	July 26 – August 2, 2022	700 (LV)	± 4.4%	42%	44%	15%
Global Strategy Group (D) (Note: This poll was sponsored by 314 Action, which supports Caraveo.)	June 9–13, 2022	500 (LV)	± 4.4%	36%	44%	20%

Hypothetical polling

Generic Democrat vs. generic Republican

Poll source	Date(s) administered	Sample size	Margin of error	Generic Democrat	Generic Republican	Undecided
Global Strategy Group (D)	June 9–13, 2022	500 (LV)	± 4.4%	42%	46%	13%

==== Results ====
2022 Colorado's 8th congressional district election
Party	Candidate	Votes	%
Democratic	Yadira Caraveo	114,377	48.36
Republican	Barbara Kirkmeyer	112,745	47.67
Libertarian	Richard Ward	9,280	3.92
Center	Tim Long (write-in)	99	0.04
Total votes		236,501	100.00
Democratic win (new seat)			

===== By county =====
County	Yadira Caraveo Democratic		Barbara Kirkmeyer Republican		Richard Ward Libertarian		Tim Long Center (write-in)		Margin		Total
County	Votes	%	Votes	%	Votes	%	Votes	%	Votes	%	Total
Adams	78,113	55.12%	57,856	40.83%	5,684	4.01%	61	0.04%	20,257	14.29%	141,714
Larimer	4,154	43.14%	5,140	53.37%	329	3.42%	7	0.07%	-986	-10.24%	9,630
Weld	32,110	37.71%	49,749	58.42%	3,267	3.84%	31	0.04%	-17,639	-20.71%	85,157

== Notes ==
Partisan clients
