= 2018 Colorado Senate election =

2018 Colorado State Senate election
- November 6, 2018

17 of the 35 seats in the Colorado Senate 18 seats needed for a majority
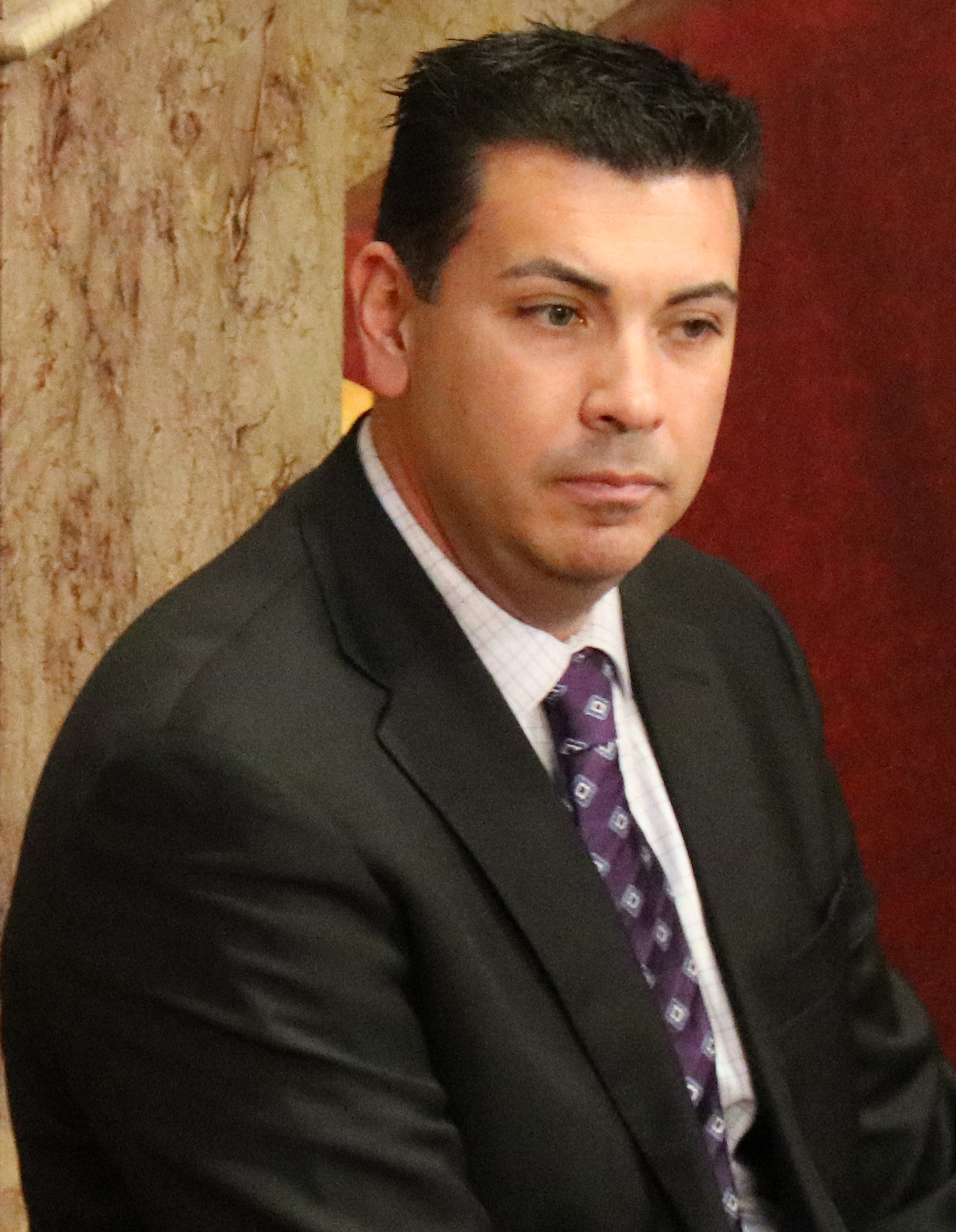

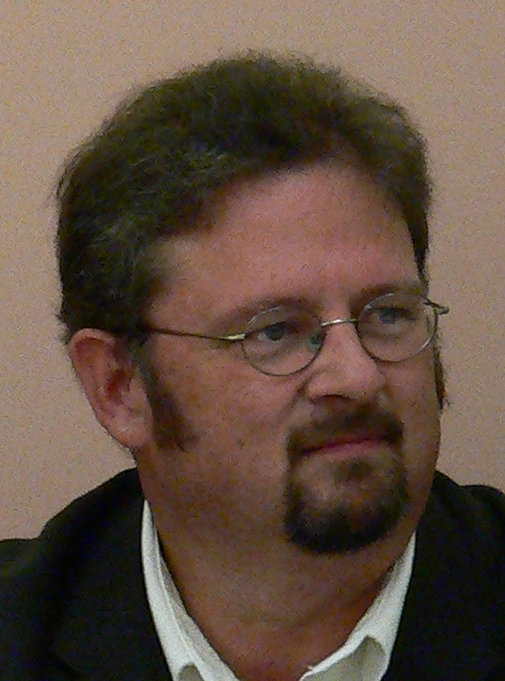
	Majority party	Minority party
Leader	Leroy Garcia	Kevin Grantham (term-limited)
Party	Democratic	Republican
Leader's seat	District 3	District 2
Last election	17	18
Seats before	16	18
Seats won	19	16
Seat change	▲3	▼2
Popular vote	608,037	564,971
Percentage	50.3%	46.75%
Seats up	6	10
Races won	9	8
- Results: Democratic gain Democratic hold Republican hold No election
President of the Senate before election
Kevin Grantham
Republican
Elected President of the Senate
Leroy Garcia
Democratic

The 2018 Colorado State Senate elections took place as part of the biennial United States elections. Colorado voters elected state senators in 17 of the 35 districts in the state senate. State senators serve four-year terms in the Colorado State Senate. The Colorado Reapportionment Commission provides a statewide map of the state Senate here, and individual district maps are available from the U.S. Census here.

A primary election on June 26, 2018, determined which candidates appeared on the November 6 general election ballot. Primary election results can be obtained from the Colorado Secretary of State's website.

Following the 2016 state Senate elections, Republicans maintained effective control of the Senate with 18 members. Democratic state Senator Cheri Jahn switched from Democrat to unaffiliated on December 29, 2017. However, Sen. Jahn decided to still caucus with Democrats. In the 2018 election, Republicans defended 10 seats, while Democrats defended six seats, with Jahn's one Independent seat up for grabs.

To claim control of the chamber from Republicans, the Democrats needed to net one Senate seat while electing a Democrat to the Independent seat. The Democratic candidate won the Independent seat, while Democrats netted two additional seats, giving the party majority status in the chamber. The results ultimately led to Democrats gaining a political trifecta for the first time since 2014.

== Background ==
Heading to the 2018 elections, Republicans held a one-seat majority in the Senate and sought to defend their very narrow majority in the election. Democrats had not held the state Senate since 2014, and aimed at flipping it to potentially achieve a political trifecta, as Democrats were expected to retain control of the state House, and gubernatorial nominee Jared Polis was considered the frontrunner heading up to the polls.

Five Senate seats were considered vital to determine the political balance of the Senate and even the political outlook of the state. Democratic women dubbed the "Fab Five" were running to defend or win these five competitive districts. Incumbent Republicans Tim Neville and Beth Humenik were seen as the most vulnerable, as both narrowly won their races in 2014, and they represented districts which Democratic presidential nominee Hillary Clinton won in 2016.

== Results ==
- Districts not shown would not be up for election until 2020.

District	Incumbent	Party	Elected senator	Party
1st	Jerry Sonnenberg	Rep	Jerry Sonnenberg	Rep
2nd	Kevin Grantham	Rep	Dennis Hisey	Rep
3rd	Leroy Garcia	Dem	Leroy Garcia	Dem
5th	Kerry Donovan	Dem	Kerry Donovan	Dem
6th	Don Coram	Rep	Don Coram	Rep
7th	Ray Scott	Rep	Ray Scott	Rep
9th	Kent Lambert	Rep	Paul Lundeen	Rep
11th	Michael Merrifield	Dem	Pete Lee	Dem
13th	John Cooke	Rep	John Cooke	Rep
15th	Kevin Lundberg	Rep	Rob Woodward	Rep
16th	Tim Neville	Rep	Tammy Story	Dem
20th	Cheri Jahn	Ind	Jessie Danielson	Dem
22nd	Andy Kerr	Dem	Brittany Pettersen	Dem
24th	Beth Martinez Humenik	Rep	Faith Winter	Dem
30th	Chris Holbert	Rep	Chris Holbert	Rep
32nd	Irene Aguilar	Dem	Robert Rodriguez	Dem
34th	Lucía Guzmán	Dem	Julie Gonzales	Dem

== Incumbents not seeking re-election ==
=== Term-limited incumbents ===
Seven incumbent senators (three Democrats, three Republicans and one independent) were term-limited and unable to seek a third term.

- Kevin Grantham (R), District 2
- Kent Lambert (R), District 9
- Kevin Lundberg (R), District 15
- Cheri Jahn (I), District 20
- Andy Kerr (D), District 22
- Irene Aguilar (D) District 32
- Lucia Guzman (D), District 34

=== Retiring incumbents ===
One incumbent Democrat did not seek re-election despite being able to do so.

- Michael Merrifield (D), District 11

== Closest races ==
Seats where the margin of victory was under 10%:

1. District 15, 6.18%
2. District 6, 9.38%

== Predictions ==
Source	Ranking	As of
Governing	Tossup	October 8, 2018

== Detailed results ==
=== District 1 ===
Democratic primary
Party	Candidate	Votes	%
Democratic	Debra Gustafson	5,523	100.0
Total votes		5,523	100.0

Republican primary
Party	Candidate	Votes	%
Republican	Jerry Sonnenberg (incumbent)	23,879	100.0
Total votes		23,879	100.0

2018 Colorado Senate election, 1st District
Party	Candidate	Votes	%
Republican	Jerry Sonnenberg (incumbent)	52,311	79.01
Democratic	Debra Gustafson	13,894	20.99
Total votes		66,205	100.0
Republican hold			

=== District 2 ===
Democratic primary
Party	Candidate	Votes	%
Democratic	Beth "Hart" Harz	6,813	74.09
Democratic	Dennis Obduskey	2,383	25.91
Total votes		9,196	100.0

Republican primary
Party	Candidate	Votes	%
Republican	Dennis Hisey	12,818	57.95
Republican	Stephanie Luck	9,302	42.05
Total votes		22,120	100.0

2018 Colorado Senate election, 2nd District
Party	Candidate	Votes	%
Republican	Dennis Hisey	42,531	65.32
Democratic	Beth "Hart" Harz	22,583	34.68
Total votes		65,114	100.0
Republican hold			

=== District 3 ===
Democratic primary
Party	Candidate	Votes	%
Democratic	Leroy M. Garcia (incumbent)	15,423	100.0
Total votes		15,423	100.0

2018 Colorado Senate election, 3rd District
Party	Candidate	Votes	%
Democratic	Leroy M. Garcia (incumbent)	39,768	73.62
Libertarian	John Pickerill	14,253	26.38
Total votes		54,021	100.0
Democratic hold			

=== District 5 ===
Democratic primary
Party	Candidate	Votes	%
Democratic	Kerry Donovan (incumbent)	13,707	100.0
Total votes		13,707	100.0

Republican primary
Party	Candidate	Votes	%
Republican	Olen Lund	9,796	100.0
Total votes		9,796	100.0

2018 Colorado Senate election, 5th District
Party	Candidate	Votes	%
Democratic	Kerry Donovan (incumbent)	41,838	60.45
Republican	Olen Lund	27,375	39.55
Total votes		69,213	100.0
Democratic hold			

=== District 6 ===
Republican primary
Party	Candidate	Votes	%
Republican	Don Coram (incumbent)	14,893	100.0
Total votes		14,893	100.0

Democratic primary
Party	Candidate	Votes	%
Democratic	Guinn Unger, Jr.	11,392	100.0
Total votes		11,392	100.0

2018 Colorado Senate election, 6th District
Party	Candidate	Votes	%
Republican	Don Coram (incumbent)	40,088	54.69
Democratic	Guinn Unger, Jr.	33,208	45.31
Total votes		73,296	100.0
Republican hold			

=== District 7 ===
Democratic primary
Party	Candidate	Votes	%
Democratic	Chris Kennedy	8,996	100.0
Total votes		8,996	100.0

Republican primary
Party	Candidate	Votes	%
Republican	Ray Scott (incumbent)	14,361	64.07
Republican	Dan Thurlow	8,054	35.93
Total votes		22,415	100.0

2018 Colorado Senate election, 7th District
Party	Candidate	Votes	%
Republican	Ray Scott (incumbent)	42,327	63.62
Democratic	Chris Kennedy	24,205	36.38
Total votes		66,532	100.0
Republican hold			

=== District 9 ===
Democratic primary
Party	Candidate	Votes	%
Democratic	Gil Armendariz	9,751	100.0
Total votes		9,751	100.0

Republican primary
Party	Candidate	Votes	%
Republican	Paul Lundeen	26,206	100.0
Total votes		26,206	100.0

2018 Colorado Senate election, 9th District
Party	Candidate	Votes	%
Republican	Paul Lundeen	61,341	70.32
Democratic	Gil Armendariz	25,892	29.68
Total votes		87,233	100.0
Republican hold			

=== District 11 ===
Democratic primary
Party	Candidate	Votes	%
Democratic	Pete Lee	10,499	100.0
Total votes		10,499	100.0

Republican primary
Party	Candidate	Votes	%
Republican	Pat McIntire	7,580	100.0
Total votes		7,580	100.0

2018 Colorado Senate election, 11th District
Party	Candidate	Votes	%
Democratic	Pete Lee	28,015	61.96
Republican	Pat McIntire	17,200	38.04
Total votes		45,215	100.0
Democratic hold			

=== District 13 ===
Republican primary
Party	Candidate	Votes	%
Republican	John Cooke (incumbent)	10,763	100.0
Total votes		10,763	100.0

Democratic primary
Party	Candidate	Votes	%
Democratic	Phil Kelley	7,667	100.0
Total votes		7,667	100.0

2018 Colorado Senate election, 13th District
Party	Candidate	Votes	%
Republican	John Cooke (incumbent)	33,026	58.71
Democratic	Phil Kelley	21,453	38.14
Libertarian	Eric E. Joss	1,776	3.16
Total votes		56,255	100.0
Republican hold			

=== District 15 ===
Democratic primary
Party	Candidate	Votes	%
Democratic	Rebecca Cranston	14,699	100.0
Total votes		14,699	100.0

Republican primary
Party	Candidate	Votes	%
Republican	Rob Woodward	16,023	100.0
Total votes		16,023	100.0

2018 Colorado Senate election, 15th District
Party	Candidate	Votes	%
Republican	Rob Woodward	44,434	53.09
Democratic	Rebecca Cranston	39,256	46.91
Total votes		83,690	100.0
Republican hold			

=== District 16 ===
Republican primary
Party	Candidate	Votes	%
Republican	Tim Neville (incumbent)	12,996	100.0
Total votes		12,996	100.0

Democratic primary
Party	Candidate	Votes	%
Democratic	Tammy Story	18,424	100.0
Total votes		18,424	100.0

2018 Colorado Senate election, 16th District
Party	Candidate	Votes	%
Democratic	Tammy Story	47,403	55.67
Republican	Tim Neville (incumbent)	35,154	41.28
Libertarian	James Gilman	2,597	3.05
Total votes		85,154	100.0
Democratic gain from Republican			

=== District 20 ===
Democratic primary
Party	Candidate	Votes	%
Democratic	Jessie Danielson	19,778	100.0
Total votes		19,778	100.0

Republican primary
Party	Candidate	Votes	%
Republican	Christine Jensen	13,821	100.0
Total votes		13,821	100.0

2018 Colorado Senate election, 20th District
Party	Candidate	Votes	%
Democratic	Jessie Danielson	49,974	54.13
Republican	Christine Jensen	39,102	42.36
Libertarian	Charles Messick	3,239	3.51
Total votes		92,315	100.0
Democratic gain from Independent			

=== District 22 ===
Democratic primary
Party	Candidate	Votes	%
Democratic	Brittany Pettersen	16,066	100.0
Total votes		16,066	100.0

Republican primary
Party	Candidate	Votes	%
Republican	Tony Sanchez	11,440	100.0
Total votes		11,440	100.0

2018 Colorado Senate election, 22nd District
Party	Candidate	Votes	%
Democratic	Brittany Pettersen	42,747	58.16
Republican	Tony Sanchez	30,754	41.84
Total votes		73,501	100.0
Democratic hold			

=== District 24 ===
Republican primary
Party	Candidate	Votes	%
Republican	Beth Martinez Humenik (incumbent)	9,401	100.0
Total votes		9,401	100.0

Democratic primary
Party	Candidate	Votes	%
Democratic	Faith Winter	14,313	100.0
Total votes		14,313	100.0

2018 Colorado Senate election, 24th District
Party	Candidate	Votes	%
Democratic	Faith Winter	35,578	52.32
Republican	Beth Martinez Humenik (incumbent)	27,068	39.80
Independent	Adam Matkowsky	3,328	4.89
Libertarian	Donald Osborn	2,033	2.99
Total votes		68,007	100.0
Democratic gain from Republican			

=== District 30 ===
Republican primary
Party	Candidate	Votes	%
Republican	Chris Holbert (incumbent)	15,342	100.0
Total votes		15,342	100.0

Democratic primary
Party	Candidate	Votes	%
Democratic	Julia Varnell-Sarjeant	12,031	100.0
Total votes		12,031	100.0

2018 Colorado Senate election, 30th District
Party	Candidate	Votes	%
Republican	Chris Holbert (incumbent)	43,948	52.78
Democratic	Julia Varnell-Sarjeant	34,604	41.56
Independent	Steve Peterson	4,710	5.66
Total votes		83,262	100.0
Republican hold			

=== District 32 ===
Republican primary
Party	Candidate	Votes	%
Republican	Mark Calonder	5,561	100.0
Total votes		5,561	100.0

Democratic primary
Party	Candidate	Votes	%
Democratic	Robert Rodriguez	10,636	39.82
Democratic	Zach Neumann	8,616	32.26
Democratic	Hazel Gibson	7,458	27.92
Total votes		26,710	100.0

2018 Colorado Senate election, 32nd District
Party	Candidate	Votes	%
Democratic	Robert Rodriguez	53,307	71.99
Republican	Mark Calonder	17,294	23.36
Independent	Peter Lucas Smith	3,446	4.65
Total votes		74,047	100.0
Democratic hold			

=== District 34 ===
Republican primary
Party	Candidate	Votes	%
Republican	Gordon Alley	2,777	100.0
Total votes		2,777	100.0

Democratic primary
Party	Candidate	Votes	%
Democratic	Julie Gonzales	14,798	63.80
Democratic	Milo Schwab	4,574	19.72
Democratic	Alan Kennedy-Shaffer	3,821	16.47
Total votes		23,193	100.0

2018 Colorado Senate election, 34th District
Party	Candidate	Votes	%
Democratic	Julie Gonzales	54,312	83.13
Republican	Gordon Alley	11,018	16.87
Total votes		65,330	100.0
Democratic hold			

== Analysis ==
Democrats handily flipped the state Senate by significantly outperforming their margins compared to 2016 and 2014. Most of the votes that led to the Senate flipping was due to the outsized margins Democratic candidates received throughout the Front Range and ski counties. Independent voters (the largest share of the electorate), along with women voters, younger voters, and suburban voters, helped propel Democrats to victory in many races. Races that were considered competitive but eventually won by the so-called "Fab Five" of Faith Winter, Jessie Danielson, Tammy Story, Kerry Donovan, and Brittany Pettersen were won by relatively large margins. Due to Democrats flipping the Senate, they were able to gain a political trifecta, as they expanded their majorities in the state House and won all statewide races, including for governor.

The results in the Senate and other elections throughout 2018 were called by observers a "blue wave" in which Democrats made historic gains in Colorado.

== See also ==
- United States elections, 2018
- United States House of Representatives elections in Colorado, 2018
- Colorado elections, 2018
- Colorado gubernatorial election, 2018
- Colorado Attorney General election, 2018
- Colorado Secretary of State election, 2018
- Colorado State Treasurer election, 2018
- Colorado State Board of Education election, 2018
- Regents of the University of Colorado election, 2018
- Colorado House of Representatives election, 2018
- Elections in Colorado
