= Maryanne Keller =

American politician

Maryanne "Moe" Keller
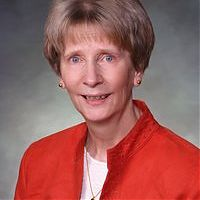

Member of the Colorado Senate from the 20th district
- In office January, 2003 – January, 2011
- Preceded by: Ed Perlmutter
- Succeeded by: Cheri Jahn

Member of the Colorado House of Representatives from the 24th district
- In office January, 1993 – January 2001
- Preceded by: Pat Killian
- Succeeded by: Cheri Jahn

Personal details
- Party: Democratic

Maryanne "Moe" Keller (born February 19, 1949) is an educator and former politician from Colorado. Before entering politics, she worked as a teacher and interpreter for the deaf for 25 years in Jefferson County and Denver Public Schools. She served six years in the Wheat Ridge City Council before being elected to serve eight years in the Colorado House of Representatives. She also served in the Colorado State Senate from 2003 to 2011. and served as the Chair of the Joint Budget Committee and Vice-Chair of the Appropriations Committee.

In 2015, she was appointed by John Hickenlooper as a representative of the Respite Care Task Force. She is known for her work with the developmental disability and mental health communities.
