= Ed Perlmutter =

American politician (born 1953)

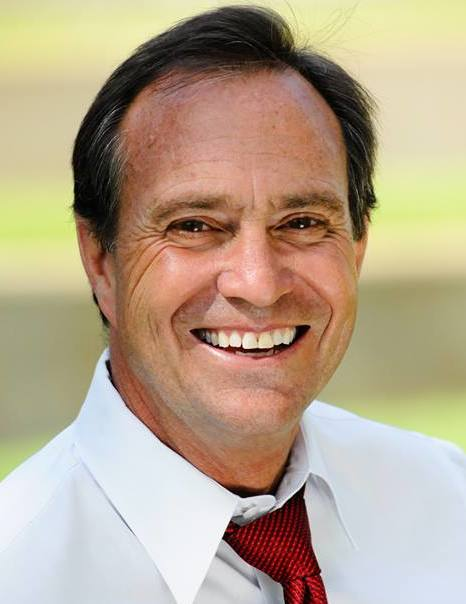

Member of the U.S. House of Representatives from Colorado's 7th district
- In office January 3, 2007 – January 3, 2023
- Preceded by: Bob Beauprez
- Succeeded by: Brittany Pettersen

Member of the Colorado Senate from the 20th district
- In office January 9, 1995 – January 8, 2003
- Preceded by: Claire Traylor
- Succeeded by: Maryanne Keller

Personal details
- Born: Edwin George Perlmutter; May 1, 1953 (age 73) Denver, Colorado, U.S.
- Party: Democratic
- Spouses: Deana Perlmutter (m. 1981; div. 2008); Nancy Henderson (m. 2010)
- Children: 3
- Education: University of Colorado, Boulder (BA, JD)
- Website: House website
- Perlmutter's voice Perlmutter supporting the American Rescue Plan Act. Recorded February 26, 2021

Edwin George Perlmutter (born May 1, 1953) is an American lawyer and politician who served as the U.S. representative for Colorado's 7th congressional district from 2007 to 2023. A member of the Democratic Party, his district was located in the northern and western suburbs of the Denver metropolitan area. He previously served as the Colorado state senator from the 20th district from 1995 to 2003. On January 10, 2022, he announced he would not seek re-election in 2022.

== Early life, education, and career ==
Perlmutter was born in Denver, the son of Alice Love (née Bristow) and Leonard Michael Perlmutter on May 1, 1953. His father was Jewish, the son of immigrants from Poland; his mother was Christian, and was of English and Irish descent. Perlmutter describes himself as a Christian. Perlmutter graduated from Jefferson High School in Edgewater, Colorado and went on to graduate from the University of Colorado at Boulder in 1975. He received his Juris Doctor at Colorado in 1978.

== Colorado Senate ==
Perlmutter was a Colorado State Senator from 1995 to 2003. He was elected to two four-year terms to represent central Jefferson County as State Senator from 1995 to 2003—the first Democrat elected in the district in 30 years.

He has assisted numerous campaigns in Colorado, and was co-chair of the John Kerry 2004 presidential campaign in Colorado.

== U.S. House of Representatives ==
=== Committee assignments ===
- Committee on Financial Services
  - Subcommittee on National Security, International Development and Monetary Policy
  - Subcommittee on Oversight and Investigations
- United States House Committee on Science, Space and Technology
  - Subcommittee on Energy
  - Subcommittee on Space
- United States House Committee on Rules
- Select Committee on the Modernization of Congress

=== Caucus memberships ===
- New Democrat Coalition
- Aerospace Caucus
- Cannabis Caucus
- Gun Violence Prevention Task Force
- Labor Caucus
- NASA Caucus
- National Parks Caucus
- National Wildlife Refuge Caucus
- Olympic and Paralympic Caucus
- Pro-Choice Caucus
- Science and National Labs Caucus
- Sustainable Energy and Environment Caucus
- Climate Solutions Caucus

=== Secure and Fair Enforcement (SAFE) Banking Act ===
Since 2013, Perlmutter and Rep. Denny Heck have introduced legislation to improve access to banking and financial services for cannabis businesses. Initially known as the Marijuana Business Access to Banking Act, it was rebranded as the Secure and Fair Enforcement (SAFE) Banking Act in 2017. On September 25, 2019, the House of Representatives passed the SAFE Banking Act by a 321–103 vote, marking the first time that a standalone cannabis reform bill had passed either chamber of Congress.

== Political campaigns ==
=== 2006 ===
Perlmutter won the Democratic nomination for the 7th district by defeating former State Representative Peggy Lamm and college professor Herb Rubenstein, with 53% of the vote in the primary. State education chair Rick O'Donnell was unopposed for the Republican nomination. Dave Chandler, a Green, was also a candidate.

The seat was held by Republican Bob Beauprez, who was reelected to a second term in 2004 with 55% of the vote, after winning his first term by only 121 votes. He left the seat at the end of the 2004–2006 term, having failed in his bid to become Governor of Colorado.

In late September, O'Donnell was put on the defensive when ads appeared noting that he had previously supported abolishing Social Security. A Survey USA poll soon after that showed Perlmutter with a 54 to 37 percent lead, although GOP consultants guessed that the support was "soft". An October 4 poll released by Zogby showed Perlmutter ahead of O'Donnell by 45-34 percent. Cook Political Report rating: Republican Toss Up. CQPolitics rating: No Clear Favorite.

In the end, Perlmutter (54%) soundly defeated O'Donnell (42%) for the congressional seat, helping Democrats to regain the majority in the U.S. House.

=== 2008 ===
Perlmutter won against Republican nominee John W. Lerew.

=== 2010 ===
Perlmutter defeated Republican nominee Ryan Frazier and Libertarian nominee Buck Bailey on November 2, 2010. The 7th Congressional district had been cited as a GOP target in 2010.

=== 2012 ===
Perlmutter defeated Republican nominee Joe Coors Jr. on November 6, 2012. Perlmutter's victory came despite new congressional boundaries that made his district 4 percent less Democratic. Perlmutter was ahead by 9 percentage points in Jefferson County, where 60 percent of the voters live. Perlmutter led Coors by 17 percentage points in Adams County, where 40 percent of the constituents in the newly drawn 7th district live.

=== 2014 ===
Perlmutter defeated Republican nominee Don Ytterberg in the 2014 general election. He won with 55.1% of the vote.

=== 2016 ===
Perlmutter defeated Republican nominee George Athanasopoulos and Libertarian nominee Martin L. Buchanan in the 2016 general election. He won with 55.18% of the vote.

=== 2018 ===
On April 9, 2017, Perlmutter announced his candidacy for Governor of Colorado in the 2018 election. On July 10, 2017, Perlmutter announced that he was dropping out of the gubernatorial race and would not seek reelection to his congressional seat. However, on August 21, 2017, he announced he had reversed his decision again and ran for reelection for his congressional seat. He defeated Republican nominee Mark Barrington, winning re-election with 60.42% of the vote.

=== 2020 ===
Perlmutter defeated Republican nominee Casper Stockham, Libertarian nominee Ken Biles, and Unity nominee Dave Olszta in the 2020 general election. He won with 59.1% of the vote.

== Personal life ==
Perlmutter has three children. He and his first wife Deana divorced in 2008. In November 2010, Perlmutter married Nancy Henderson. His uncle was Denver real estate developer Jordon Perlmutter.

U.S. House of Representatives
Preceded by Bob Beauprez	Member of the U.S. House of Representatives from Colorado's 7th congressional district 2007–2023	Succeeded by Brittany Pettersen
U.S. order of precedence (ceremonial)
Preceded by Jeff Fortenberry as Former U.S. Representative	Order of precedence of the United States as Former U.S. Representative	Succeeded by Mickey Edwards as Former U.S. Representative
