= Lisa Cutter =

American politician from Colorado

Member of the Colorado Senate from the 20th district
- Incumbent
- Assumed office January 9, 2023
- Preceded by: Jessie Danielson

Member of the Colorado House of Representatives from the 25th district
- In office January 4, 2019 – January 9, 2023
- Preceded by: Timothy Leonard
- Succeeded by: Tammy Story

Personal details
- Born: October 14, 1963 (age 62)
- Party: Democratic

Lisa Ann Cutter (born October 14, 1963) is an American politician and a member of the Colorado Senate who represents District 20. The 20th senate district includes all or part of the communities of Lakewood, Dakota Ridge, Arvada, Fairmount and Evergreen in Jefferson County.

Cutter was first elected to the Colorado General Assembly in 2018, where she represented the 25th district of the Colorado House of Representatives. She was elected to the Colorado Senate in the 2022 Colorado Senate election.

== Career ==
Cutter was elected in the general election on November 6, 2018, winning 53 percent of the vote over 47 percent of Republican candidate Steve Szutenbach.

In the 2022 Colorado State Senate election, Cutter defeated Republican candidate Tim Walsh with 54 percent of the vote. In February 2025, she sponsored the Modernizing Depopulation Act (SB26-123), which opposes the use of ventilation shut down (VSD) and VSD plus heat (VSD+) in poultry disease control and encourages the use of higher-welfare methods.
