= Sue Schafer =

American politician

Member of the Colorado House of Representatives from the 24th district
- In office January 7, 2009 – January 7, 2015
- Preceded by: Cheri Jahn
- Succeeded by: Jessie Danielson

Personal details
- Born: Portland, Maine
- Party: Democratic
- Domestic partner: Barb Nash
- Website: sueschafer.com

Sue Schafer is an educator and former legislator from Colorado. Elected to the Colorado House of Representatives as a Democrat in 2008, Schafer represented House District 24, which encompassed the cities of Wheat Ridge, Edgewater, and Arvada, and was redrawn in 2011 to encompass Wheat Ridge, Edgewater and Golden.

== Biography ==
Born in Portland, Maine, Schafer holds a bachelor's degree in secondary education from the University of Nebraska–Lincoln, a master's degree in counseling from the University of Colorado Boulder and a doctorate in education from the University of Northern Colorado. She also holds a principal's license from Colorado State University.

She has taught social studies and French in Denver public schools, worked as a counselor in Omaha Public Schools and at Skagit Valley Community College in Mt. Vernon, Washington, and spent two decades as the curriculum director and accreditation manager for the Colorado Department of Education. She has served on the Executive Board of the Colorado High School Activities Association, won the Contribution Award from the Colorado Congress of Foreign Language Teachers, and the Distinguished Service Award from the Colorado Art Education Association. Most recently, Schafer has worked as an educational consultant for low-performing schools.

Schafer has been a member of the Wheat Ridge Senior/Community Center Advisory Committee, the Wheat Ridge 2020 Urban Renewal Planning Committee, the League of Women Voters, and Wheat Ridge Congregational United Church of Christ.

She served as a legislative intern in the Colorado House of Representatives in 2006 and has been both a precinct captain and the chair of the Democratic Party in the 24th district for eight years.

Schafer, a lesbian, has two daughters and lives in Wheat Ridge, Colorado with her partner, Barb Nash.

== Legislative career ==
=== 2008 election ===
Sue Schafer narrowly defeated Denver Regional Transportation District Director Dave Ruchman in the contested Democratic primary in August, winning by only 29 votes, with 50.29% of ballots cast; the race was not decided until several days after the primary election.

Schafer faced Republican Cheryl Palm in the November 2008 general election. Schafer's candidacy was endorsed by the Denver Post, the Golden Transcript, and the Wheat Ridge Transcript. She easily won the general election with 62 percent of the votes cast and took office on January 7, 2009.

=== 2009 legislative session ===
For the 2009 legislative session, Schafer was named to seats on the House Education Committee and the House Local Government Committee.

Schafer's first bill of the 2009 session, a measure requiring that flight schools train pilots in both takeoff and landing procedures, passed the state house unanimously.

=== 2011 legislative session ===
While discussing a bill to allow for government funding of male circumcision, Schafer wondered, "if there's a risk for more sexual activity, more male irresponsibility" for uncircumcised boys. She supported the bill to allow government funding for circumcision.

=== 2012 election ===
In the 2012 General Election, Representative Schafer faced Republican challenger E. V. Leyendecker. Schafer was reelected by a margin of 59% to 37%.
