= Colorado's 22nd Senate district =

American legislative district

Colorado's 22nd State Senate district
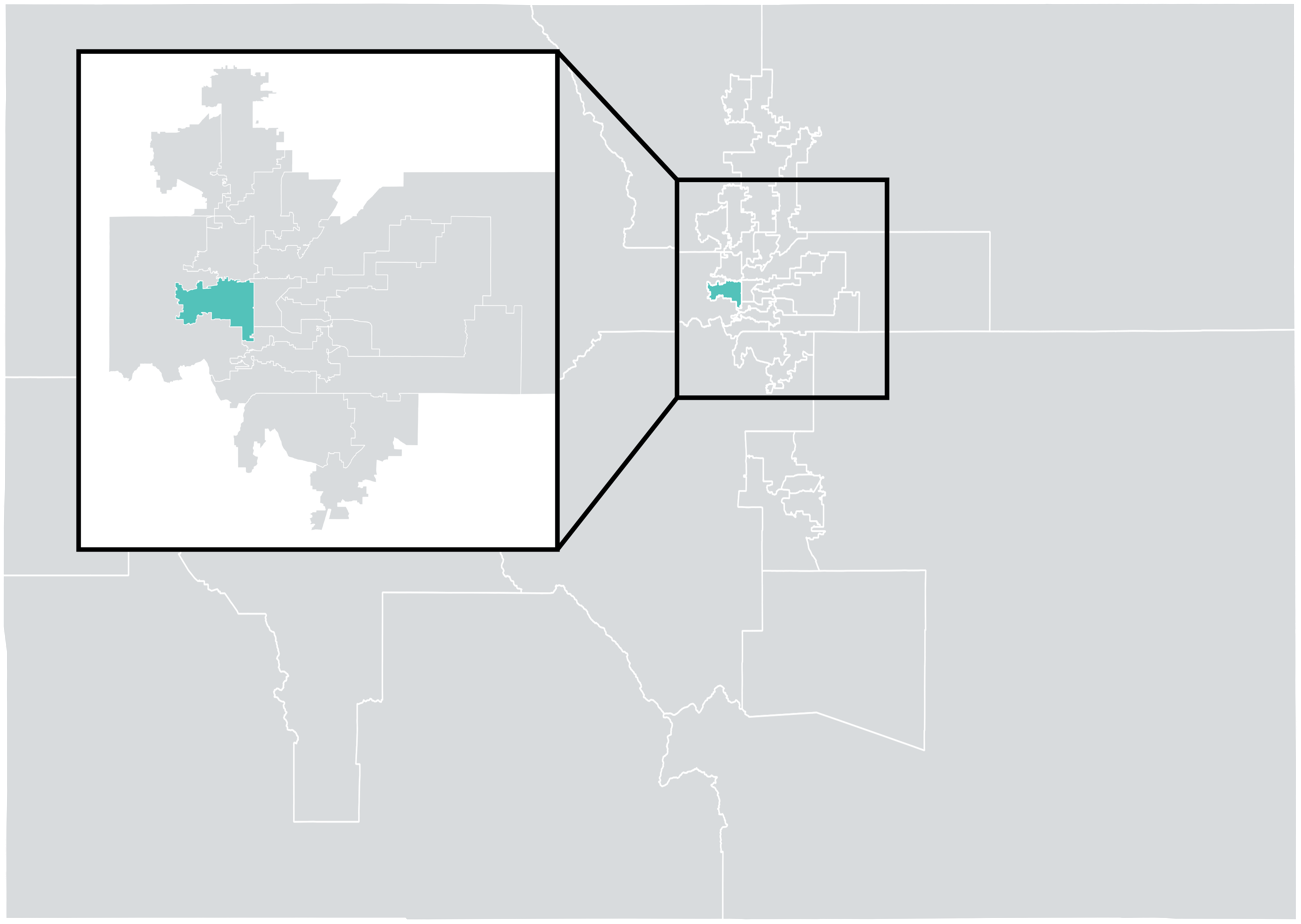
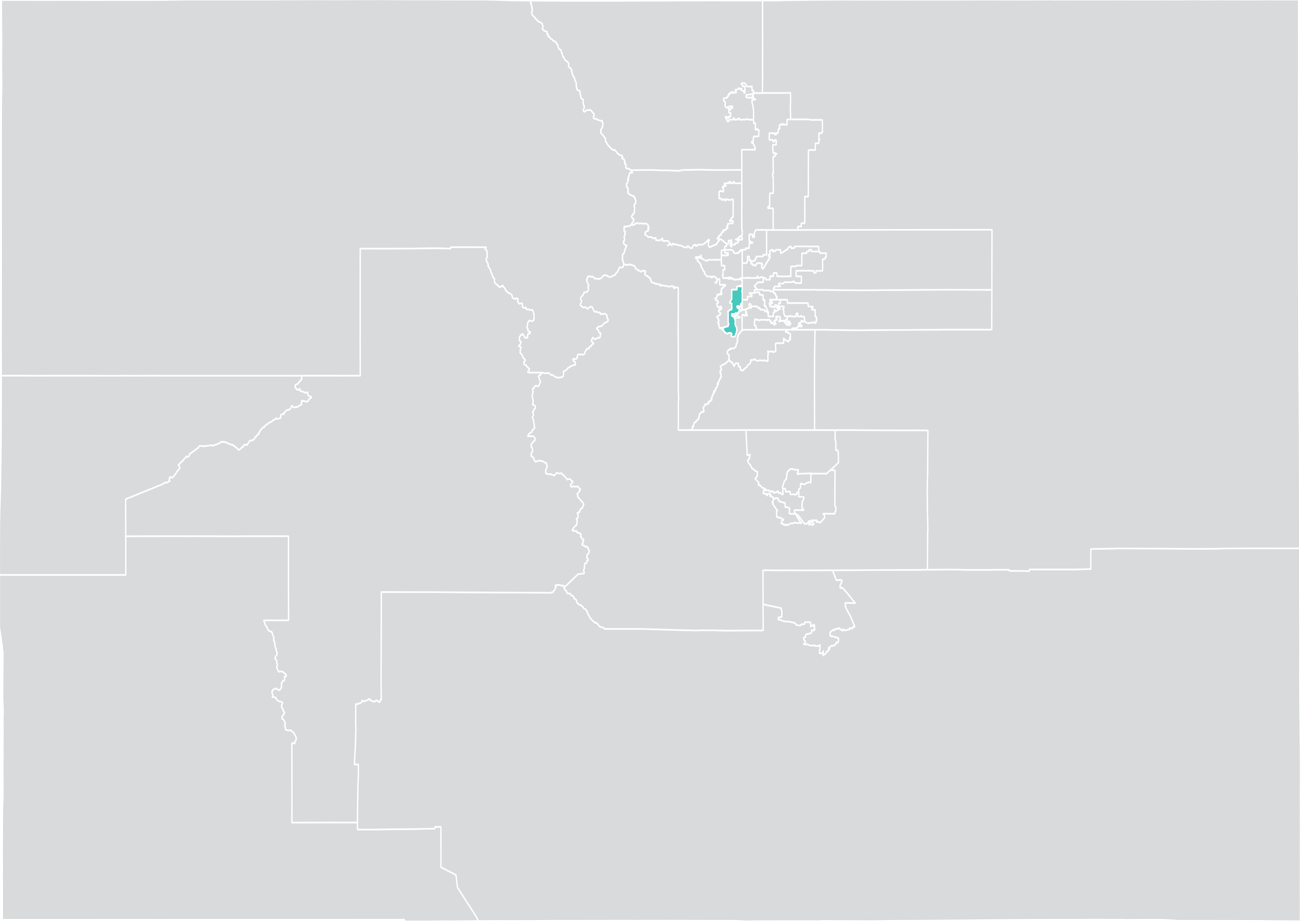
Senator
Jessie Danielson; D–Wheat Ridge
- Registration: 32.0% Democratic; 15.5% Republican; 49.8% No party preference
- Demographics: 70% White; 1% Black; 22% Hispanic; 3% Asian; 1% Native American; 2% Other
- Population (2018): 154,031
- Registered voters: 112,237

Colorado's 22nd Senate district is one of 35 districts in the Colorado Senate. It has been represented by Democrat Jessie Danielson since 2023. Prior to redistricting the district was represented by Democrats Brittany Pettersen and Andy Kerr.

== Geography ==
District 22 is based in the Denver suburb of Lakewood in Jefferson County, also stretching south to cover Dakota Ridge and Ken Caryl.

The district overlaps with Colorado's 1st, 2nd, and 7th congressional districts, and with the 22nd, 23rd, 24th, 25th, and 28th districts of the Colorado House of Representatives.

== Recent election results ==
Colorado state senators are elected to staggered four-year terms; under normal circumstances, the 22nd district holds elections in midterm years. The 2022 election was the first held under the state's new district lines.

=== 2022 ===
Senator Brittany Pettersen ran and won Colorado's 7th congressional district in 2022, and Senator Jessie Danielson, who represented the neighboring 20th district, won the 22nd district election.

2022 Colorado State Senate election, District 22
Party	Candidate	Votes	%
Democratic	Jessie Danielson	46,508	67.3
Republican	Colby Drechsel	22,609	32.7
Total votes		69,177	100

== Historical election results ==
=== 2018 ===
2018 Colorado State Senate election, District 22
Party	Candidate	Votes	%
Democratic	Brittany Pettersen	42,747	58.2
Republican	Tony Sanchez	30,754	41.8
Total votes		73,501	100
Democratic hold			

=== 2014 ===
2014 Colorado State Senate election, District 22
Primary election
Party	Candidate	Votes	%
Republican	Tony Sanchez	6,848	66.6
Republican	Mario Nicolais	3,441	33.4
Total votes		10,289	100
General election
Democratic	Andy Kerr (incumbent)	30,510	51.1
Republican	Tony Sanchez	29,174	48.9
Total votes		59,684	100
Democratic hold			

=== 2012 ===
Following 2012 redistricting, 22nd district incumbent Tim Neville was drawn out of his district and resigned to run instead for the 16th district in 2014, leaving the 22nd district open and triggering an off-cycle election.

2012 Colorado State Senate election, District 22
Party	Candidate	Votes	%
Democratic	Andy Kerr	38,845	52.6
Republican	Ken Summers	35,008	47.4
Total votes		73,853	100
Democratic gain from Republican			

=== Federal and statewide results ===
Year	Office	Results
2020	President	Biden 58.3 – 38.8%
2018	Governor	Polis 55.1 – 40.7%
2016	President	Clinton 49.9 – 41.2%
2014	Senate	Udall 48.0 – 45.9%
2014	Governor	Hickenlooper 51.4 – 43.8%
2012	President	Obama 53.0 – 44.7%
