= Cheri Jahn =

American politician

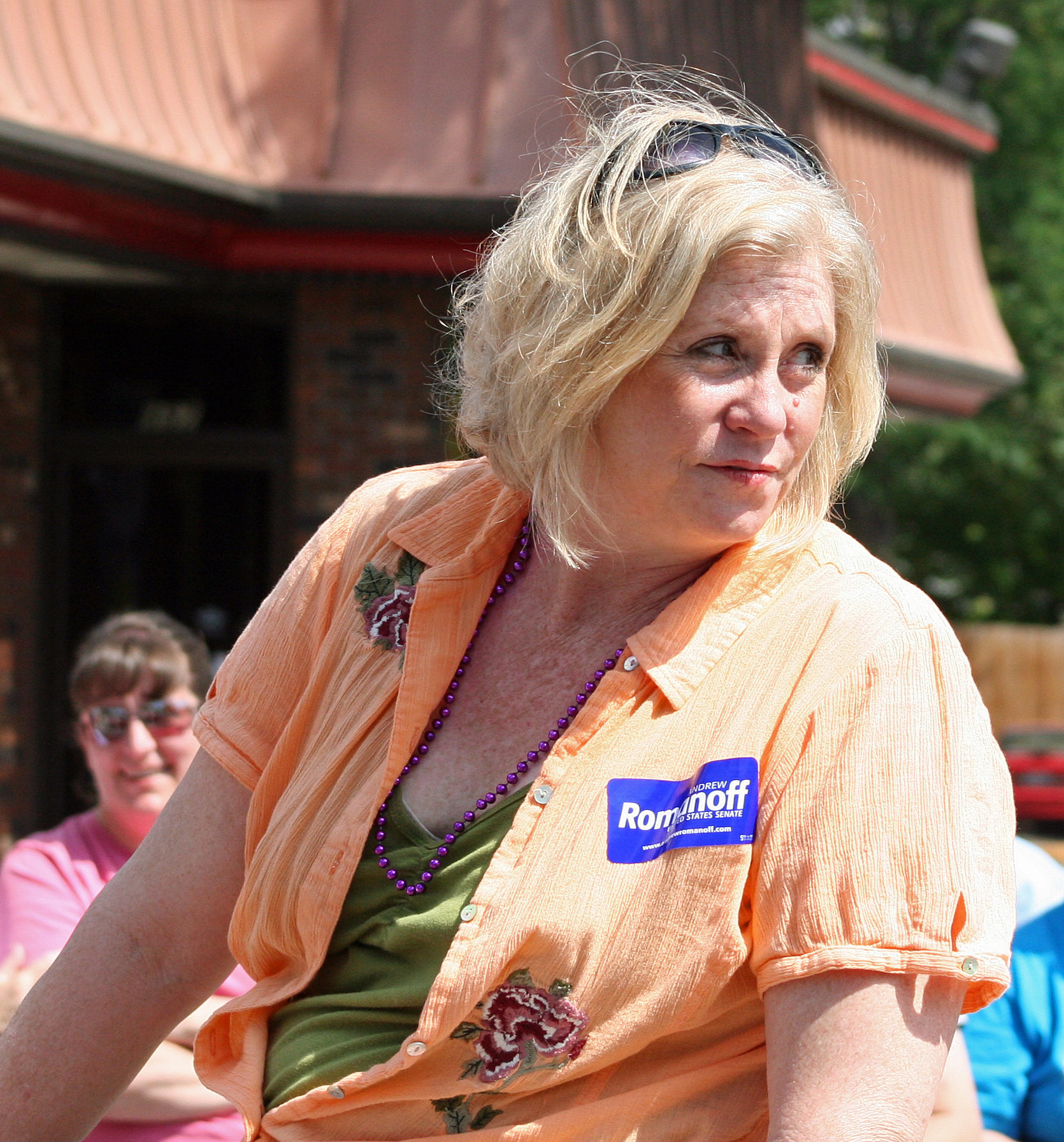
- Jahn in 2010

Member of the Colorado Senate from the 20th district
- In office January 2011 – January 4, 2018
- Preceded by: Moe Keller
- Succeeded by: Jessie Danielson

Member of the Colorado House of Representatives from the 24th district
- In office January 2001 – January 2009
- Succeeded by: Sue Schafer

Personal details
- Born: July 12, 1953 (age 73) Sterling, Colorado
- Party: Independent (since 2017)
- Other political affiliations: Democratic (until 2017)
- Profession: Small Business Owner

Cheri Jahn (born July 12, 1953) is a politician from Colorado. She served in both the State Senate and the State House of Representatives. While serving in the senate, she switched her party from Democrat to Independent In the Colorado Senate, she represented the 20th district from 2011 until 2019. Her district encompassed the city of Wheat Ridge, Colorado. Previously she was a member of the Colorado House of Representatives from 2001 through 2008.

Jahn was elected to the State House in 2000, where she represented Wheat Ridge. She was sworn into her first term in the State Senate in 2011. On December 29, 2017, Jahn announced on Facebook she was switching her political affiliation from Democratic to unaffiliated.

In the 2011 session of the Colorado General Assembly, Jahn Vice-chaired the Agricultural & Natural Resources Committee, and a member of the Finance and the Business, Labor and Technology Committees.

== Education ==
Jahn obtained her Paralegal Degree from the Community College of Denver in 2003.

== Professional experience ==
Jahn was the owner of Colorado Housekeeping Services.

== Organizations ==
Jahn has been a part of a number of organizations which include:

- Co-chair, Jefferson County Schools District Accountability Committee
- Member, Stevens Elementary, Parent Teacher Association
- Member, Everitt Middle School, Accountability Committee,
- Volunteer, High School Accountability Committee
- Volunteer, Victim Advocates Services

== Family ==
Jahn is single but has three children and together they live in Wheat Ridge, Colorado.
