= Jessie Danielson =

American politician

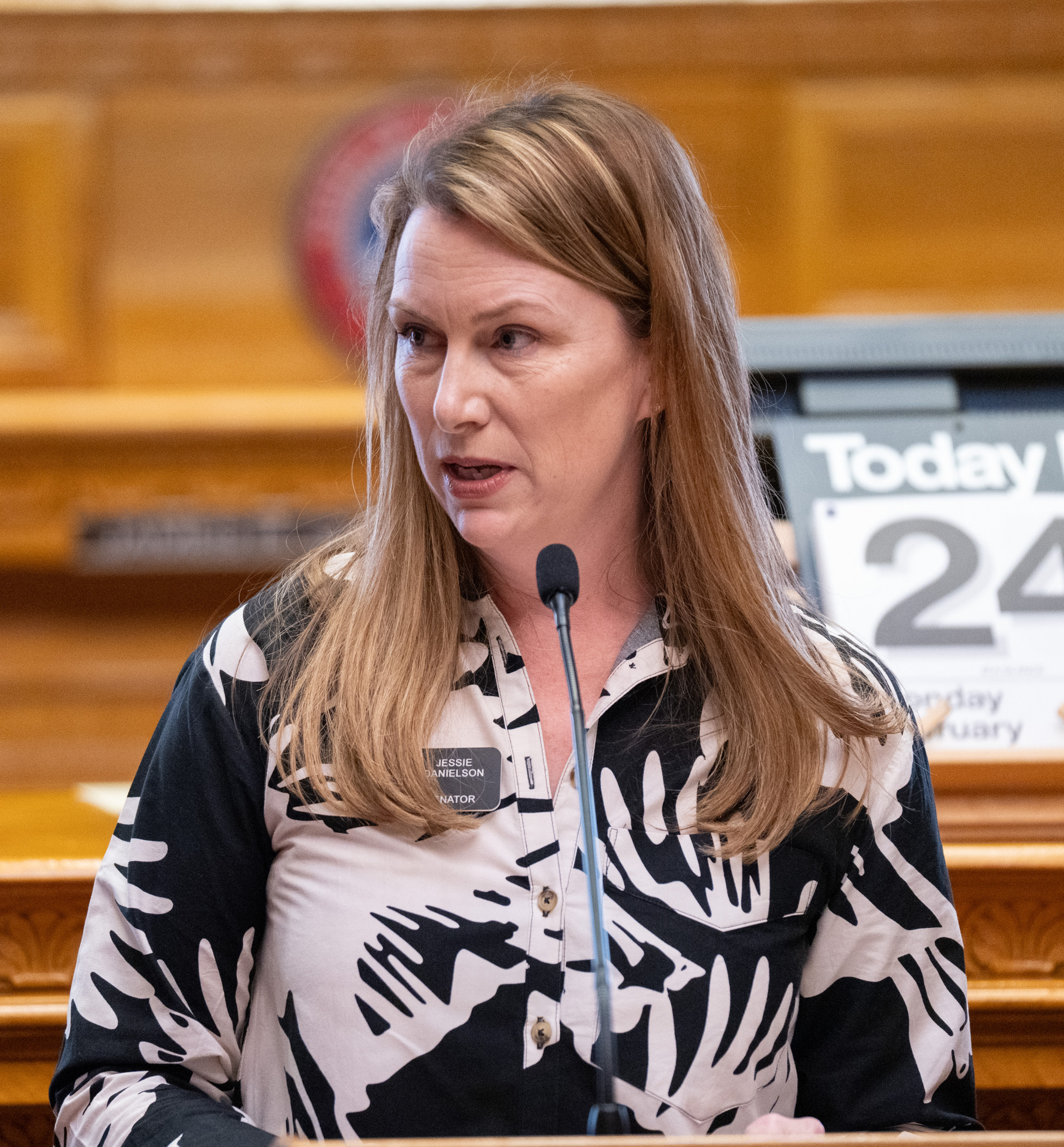
- Danielson in 2025

Member of the Colorado Senate from the 22nd district
- Incumbent
- Assumed office January 9, 2023
- Preceded by: Redistricted

Member of the Colorado Senate from the 20th district
- In office January 4, 2019 – January 9, 2023
- Preceded by: Cheri Jahn
- Succeeded by: Redistricted

Speaker pro tempore of the Colorado House of Representatives
- In office January 11, 2017 – January 4, 2019
- Preceded by: Dan Pabon
- Succeeded by: Janet Buckner

Member of the Colorado House of Representatives from the 24th district
- In office January 7, 2015 – January 4, 2019
- Preceded by: Sue Schafer
- Succeeded by: Monica Duran

Personal details
- Born: 1977 or 1978 (age 48–49) Greeley, Colorado, U.S.
- Party: Democratic
- Spouse: Andrew
- Education: University of Colorado, Boulder (BA)
- Website: Official website

Jessie Danielson (born 1977/1978) is an American politician from the State of Colorado. She is an elected member of the Colorado State Senate representing District 22 after being redistricted from District 20. Previously, she served in the Colorado House of Representatives representing District 24 in Jefferson County. A Democrat, Danielson was first elected in the November 4, 2014, general election.

She was redistricted to the 22nd district in the 2022 Colorado Senate election, succeeding Brittany Pettersen.

== Biography ==
Danielson is a resident of Wheat Ridge. She was born in Greeley and was raised on her family's farm near Ault, graduating from Highland High School. She is a graduate of the University of Colorado Boulder. Her work experience includes America Votes working on election strategy and public policy, NARAL Pro-Choice Colorado as Political Director, and an independent living center that assists the disabled in living independently.

Danielson is a former chair of the board of directors for Emerge Colorado and a former board member of both NARAL Pro-Choice Colorado and ProgressNow Colorado. She has served as a gubernatorial appointee on both the Colorado Commission on Aging and the Voter Access and Modernized Elections Commission.

== Election history ==
=== 2014 election ===
On January 12, 2014, incumbent State Representative Sue Schafer opted out of seeking a fourth term. On January 21, 2014, Danielson announced her candidacy in a press release.

==== Democratic primary ====
On January 12, 2014, local Edgewater City Councilmember and Democrat Kristian Teegardin filed his candidacy for the seat. Danielson's filing created a primary race for the Democratic nomination. To qualify for the primary ballot in Colorado, candidates are required to win at least 30% of the vote of seated delegates at nominating assemblies held by political parties. At the March 29, 2014 Democratic assembly, Danielson received 58 out of 99 votes cast (or 58.6%), with Teegardin winning the rest; meaning both candidates qualified for the Democratic primary ballot. Danielson, with the most votes, won "top line" on the primary ballot.

The Democratic primary was held as an all mail-in ballot election ending at 7:00 P.M. on June 24, 2014. Danielson defeated Teegardin, thereby becoming the Democratic nominee for the November 4, 2014 general election.

Colorado House District 24 Democratic Primary: June 24, 2014
Party	Candidate	Votes	%	±%
Democratic	Jessie Danielson	2,797	56.26%	+12.52
Democratic	Kristian Teegardin	2,175	43.74%	−12.52

==== General election ====
Having won the Democratic Party primary, Danielson faced Republican Joe DeMott—who was unopposed in the Republican Party primary—on the 2014 general election ballot. Danielson went on to win this election, which ended on November 4, 2014.

Colorado House District 24 General Election: November 4, 2014
Party	Candidate	Votes	%	±%
Democratic	Jessie Danielson	17,501	53.38%	+6.76
Republican	Joe DeMott	15,286	46.62%	−6.76

=== 2016 election ===
Danielson ran for a second two-year term in the 2016 general election. She was unopposed in the Democratic primary election. Republicans nominated Joy Bowman as the Republican candidate for the general election during their nominating assembly. Bowman later withdrew from the race, and the Republican HD-24 vacancy committee appointed Danielson's 2014 opponent, Joe DeMott, to fill the Republican vacancy on the 2016 general election ballot.

==== General election ====
Colorado House District 24 General Election: November 8, 2016
Party	Candidate	Votes	%	±%
Democratic	Jessie Danielson	24,103	56.99%	+13.98
Republican	Joe DeMott	18,191	43.01%	−13.98

Danielson defeated DeMott in the 2016 election, winning a second term.

=== 2018 election ===
On May 24, 2017, Danielson filed her candidacy for the Colorado State Senate, District 20, instead of running for a third term in the State House. Incumbent Senator Cheri Jahn was prohibited from running again by term limits. Danielson was unopposed in the 2018 Democratic primary for Senate District 20.

With Republicans holding a one-seat majority in the State Senate, the district was one of five competitive seats in the Colorado State Senate election that were watched closely around the country as Democrats worked to "flip" the chamber to Democratic control. Danielson went on to win her race, which ended on November 6, 2018.

==== General election ====
In the 2018 general election, Danielson faced Republican Christine Jensen and Libertarian Charles Messick, winning a term in the state senate by eight points.

Colorado Senate District 20 General Election: November 6, 2018
Party	Candidate	Votes	%	±%
Democratic	Jessie Danielson	49,980	54.13%	
Republican	Christine Jensen	39,113	42.36%	
Libertarian	Charles Messick	3,239	3.51%	

=== 2026 election ===
On July 15, 2025, Danielson announced her candidacy for Secretary of State of Colorado in the 2026 election. However, in the Democratic primary election held June 30, 2026, she was defeated by Jefferson County clerk Amanda Gonzalez.

== Legislative career ==
The bicameral Colorado General Assembly meets each January for a 120-day regular session.

=== 70th General Assembly ===
After the 2014 general election, Colorado's 70th General Assembly convened on January 7, 2015, at which time Danielson was sworn in. The new Speaker of the House, Dickey Lee Hullinghorst, appointed Danielson to the following committees:

- Agriculture, Livestock, & Natural Resources
- Public Health Care & Human Services
- Local Government

=== 71st General Assembly ===
After the 2016 general election, Colorado's 71st General Assembly convened on January 11, 2017, at which time Danielson was sworn in. The new Speaker of the House, Crisanta Duran, appointed Danielson Speaker Pro Tempore of the House and to three of its committees:

- Agriculture, Livestock, & Natural Resources
- Public Health Care & Human Services (Vice Chair)
- Appropriations

=== 72nd General Assembly ===
After the 2018 general election, Colorado's 72nd General Assembly convened on January 4, 2019, at which time Danielson was sworn in as State Senator for Colorado's District 20. Democrats controlled the majority of seats. Danielson was appointed to two committees:

- Agriculture & Natural Resources (Vice Chair)
- Business, Labor & Technology (Vice Chair)

==== 2019 session ====
During the 2019 Regular Session, Danielson's successful passage of the Equal Pay for Equal Work Act was a notable victory, as was legislation criminalizing the abandonment and confinement of the at-risk and elderly.

=== 73rd General Assembly ===
==== 2021 session ====
During the 2021 session, Danielson was appointed to serve on the Senate Agriculture and Natural Resources Committee, and the Senate Business, Labor, and Technology Committee.

==== 2022 session ====
In 2022, Danielson prime sponsored a bill that created a new state office to help coordinate investigations into crimes committed against Indigenous people.

=== 74th General Assembly ===
==== 2023 session ====
Danielson was appointed to serve on the Senate Business, Labor, and Technology committee. In 2023, Danielson prime sponsored a bill that increased the minimum age for an individual to purchase a firearm to 21.

==== 2024 session ====
In 2024, Danielson prime sponsored a concurrent resolution that would have created a ballot initiative that, if passed, would have changed the civil statute of limitations for childhood sex abuse cases. The resolution did not pass.

=== 75th General Assembly ===
==== 2025 session ====
Danielson currently serves as the chair of the Senate Business, Labor, and Technology committee. In 2025, Danielson Prime sponsored the Labor Peace Act, which aimed to simplify the process for unions to mandate that all employees at a company contribute fees for collective bargaining representation.

Colorado House of Representatives
Preceded by Dan Pabon	Speaker pro tempore of the Colorado House of Representatives; 2017–2019	Succeeded by Janet Buckner
