= Colorado's 20th Senate district =

American legislative district

Colorado's 20th State Senate district
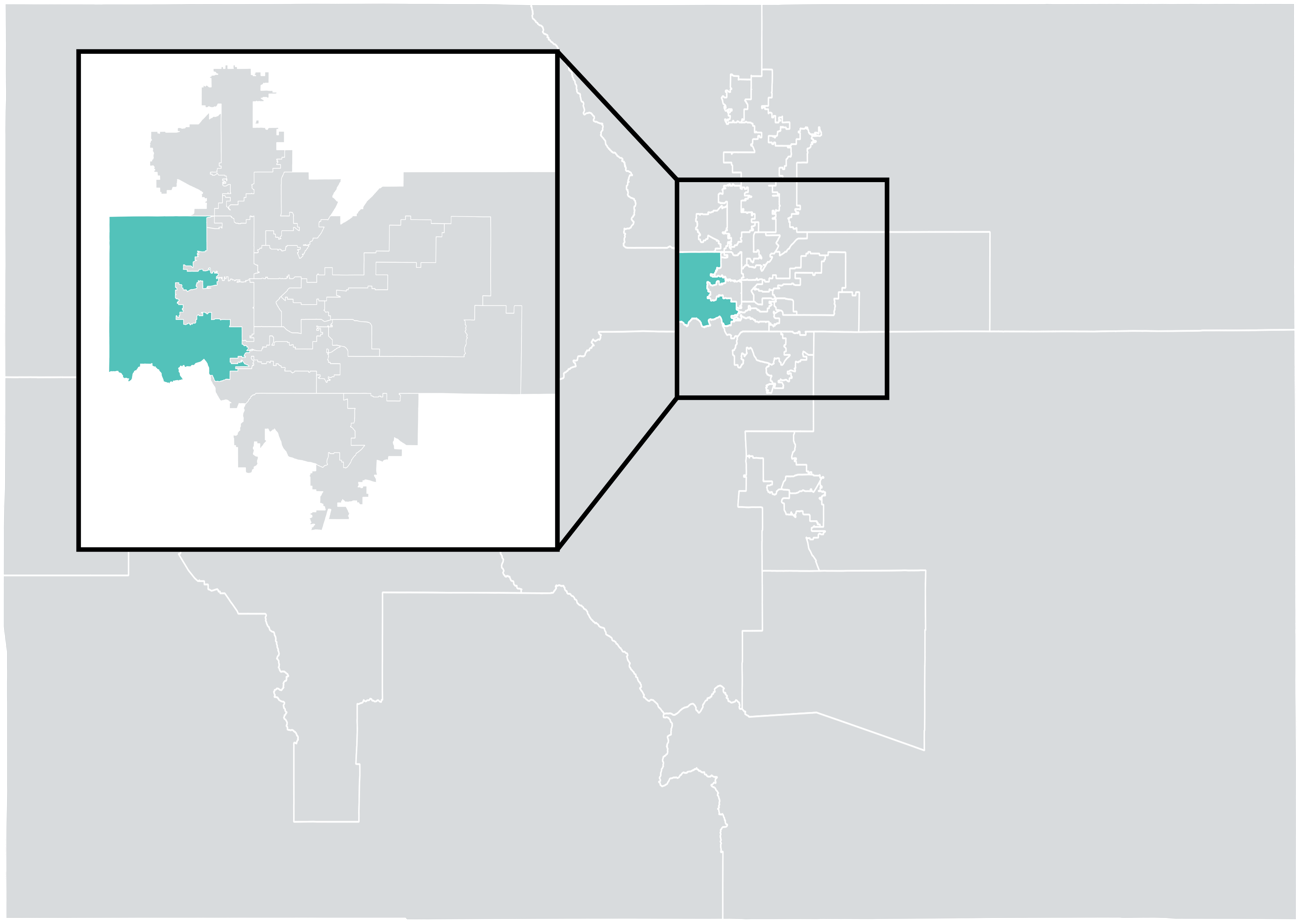
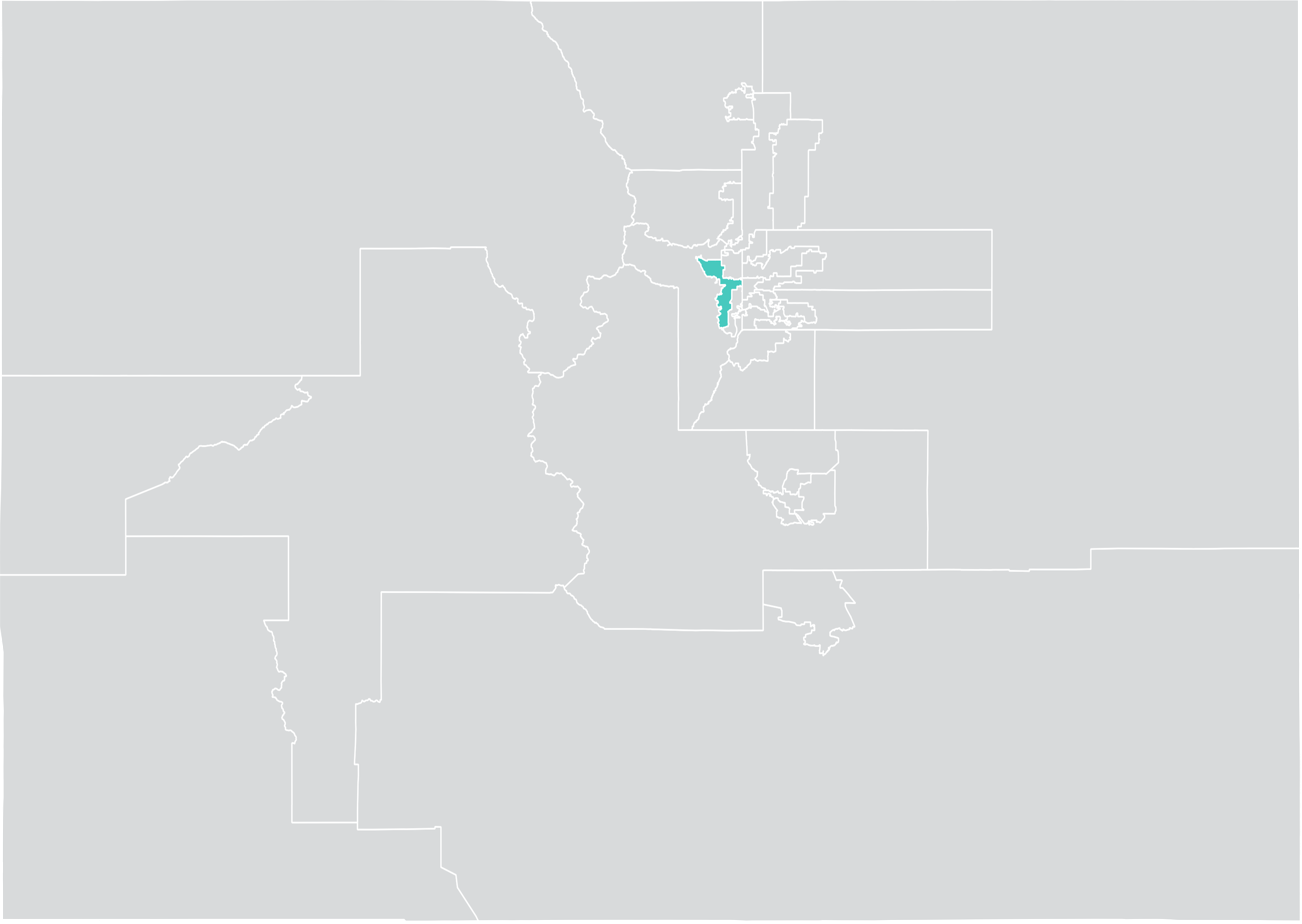
Senator
Lisa Cutter; D–Evergreen
- Registration: 25.7% Democratic; 22.4% Republican; 49.9% No party preference
- Demographics: 80% White; 1% Black; 14% Hispanic; 3% Asian; 2% Other
- Population (2018): 164,514
- Registered voters: 132,442

Colorado's 20th Senate district is one of 35 districts in the Colorado Senate. It has been represented by Democrat Lisa Cutter since 2023. Prior to redistricting the district was represented by Democrat Jessie Danielson and independent Cheri Jahn.

== Geography ==
District 20 covers the immediate western suburbs of Denver in Jefferson County, including Applewood, Wheat Ridge, and parts of Arvada and Lakewood.

The district is largely based in Colorado's 7th congressional district, with small pieces extending into the 1st and 2nd congressional districts. It overlaps with the 22nd, 23rd, 24th, 25th, 27th, and 28th districts of the Colorado House of Representatives.

== Recent election results ==
Colorado state senators are elected to staggered four-year terms; under normal circumstances, the 20th district holds elections in midterm years. The 2022 election will be the first held under the state's new district lines.

=== 2022 ===
Thanks to redistricting, Senator Rachel Zenzinger is running for re-election in the 22nd district in 2022, and State Rep. Lisa Cutter is running for the 20th district in her stead.

2022 Colorado State Senate election, District 15
Party	Candidate	Votes	%
Democratic	Lisa Cutter	49,375	54.2
Republican	Tim Walsh	39,651	43.5
Libertarian	BetteRose Ryan	2,043	2.2
Total votes		91,069	100

== Historical election results ==
=== 2018 ===
2018 Colorado State Senate election, District 20
Party	Candidate	Votes	%
Democratic	Jessie Danielson	49,974	54.1
Republican	Christine Jensen	39,102	42.4
Libertarian	Charles Messick	3,239	3.5
Total votes		92,315	100
Democratic gain from Independent			

=== 2014 ===
2014 Colorado State Senate election, District 20
Party	Candidate	Votes	%
Democratic	Cheri Jahn (incumbent)	33,543	46.8
Republican	Larry Queen	33,104	46.2
Libertarian	Chris Heismann	5,018	7.0
Total votes		71,665	100
Democratic hold			

=== Federal and statewide results ===
Year	Office	Results
2020	President	Biden 58.8 – 38.3%
2018	Governor	Polis 55.1 – 40.9%
2016	President	Clinton 50.0 – 41.1%
2014	Senate	Udall 48.1 – 46.3%
2014	Governor	Hickenlooper 51.8 – 43.7%
2012	President	Obama 51.6 – 46.0%
