= 2026 Colorado Attorney General election =

- November 3, 2026
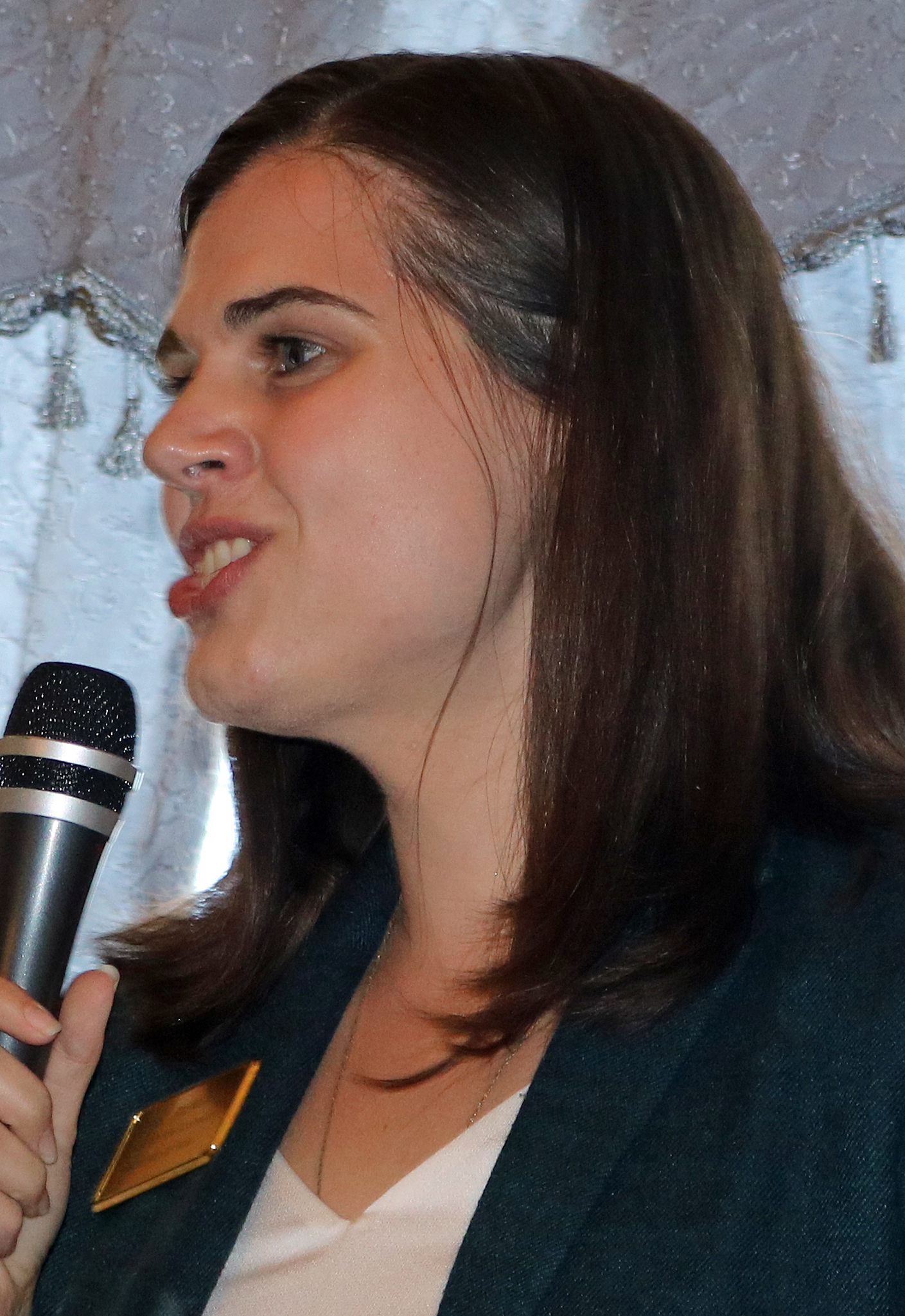

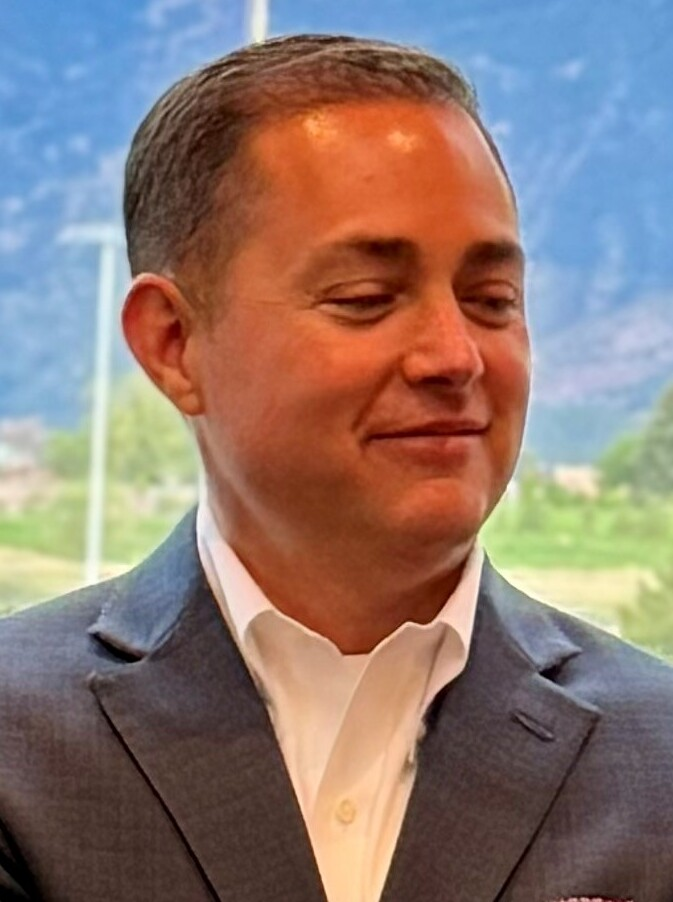
Nominee	Jena Griswold	Michael Allen
Party	Democratic	Republican
Popular vote	1,541,575	1,073,031
Percentage	59.0%	41.0%
- Griswold: 50–60% 60–70% 70–80% 80–90% Allen: 50–60% 60–70% 70–80% 80–90%
Attorney General before election
Phil Weiser
Democratic
Elected Attorney General
Jena Griswold
Democratic

The 2026 Colorado Attorney General election took place on November 3, 2026, to elect the Attorney General of Colorado. Incumbent Democratic Attorney General Phil Weiser was term-limited and could not seek re-election to a third term in office; he ran successfully for governor.

== Democratic primary ==
=== Candidates ===
Pursuant to Article 4 of Title 1 of the Colorado Revised Statutes, candidates for statewide office may qualify for the primary ballot by receiving 30% or more of the delegate vote at the party's state assembly, or by petitioning onto the ballot with sufficient voter signatures. Candidates who attend assembly but receive less than 10% of the delegate vote are disqualified from petitioning. At the Colorado Democratic Party State Assembly on March 28, 2026, Jena Griswold received 41.78% and David Seligman received 40.61%, qualifying both for the primary ballot. Michael Dougherty received 17.62% at assembly and separately petitioned onto the ballot; Hetal Doshi did not attend assembly and petitioned directly. Both Dougherty's and Doshi's petitions were deemed sufficient by the Colorado Secretary of State on April 14, 2026. All four candidates — Doshi, Dougherty, Griswold, and Seligman — appeared on the Democratic primary ballot on June 30, 2026.

==== Nominee ====
- Jena Griswold, Colorado Secretary of State (2019–present)

==== Eliminated in primary ====
- Hetal Doshi, former deputy assistant attorney general
- Michael Dougherty, Boulder County District Attorney (2018–present) and candidate for attorney general in 2018
- David Seligman, nonprofit law firm executive

==== Withdrawn ====
- Crisanta Duran, former speaker of the Colorado House of Representatives (2017–2019) from the 5th district (2011–2019) and candidate for Colorado's 1st congressional district in 2020

=== Endorsements ===
Michael Dougherty

Executive branch officials

- Troy Eid, former U.S. attorney for the district of Colorado (2006–2009) (Republican)
- Robert Troyer, former U.S. attorney for the district of Colorado (2017–2018)

Statewide officials

- Bernie Buescher, former secretary of state of Colorado (2009–2011)

State legislators

- 5 state senators
- 5 state representatives

County officials

- 10 district attorneys
- Josie Heath, former commissioner of Boulder County and nominee for U.S. Senate in 1990

Local officials

- Jennifer Arndt, mayor of Fort Collins (2021–2026)

Newspapers

- The Denver Post
Jena Griswold

Executive branch officials

- Federico Peña, former secretary of energy (1997–1998) and secretary of transportation (1993–1997)
- Tim Wirth, former under secretary of state for democracy and global affairs (1994–1997), United States Senator from Colorado (1987-1993)

U.S. representatives

- Yadira Caraveo, former CO-08 (2023–2025)
- Jason Crow, CO-06 (2019–present)
- Betsy Markey, former CO-04 (2009–2011)
- Ed Perlmutter, former CO-07 (2007–2023)
- Jamie Raskin, MD-08 (2017–present)

Statewide officials

- Gail Schoettler, former lieutenant governor of Colorado (1995–1999) (candidate's campaign chair)
- Dustin McDaniel, former attorney general of Arkansas (2007–2015)

State legislators

- 22 state legislators

Local officials

- Michael Hancock, former mayor of Denver (2011–2023)

Party officials

- Rick Palacio, former chair of the Colorado Democratic Party (2011–2017)

Labor unions

- International Alliance of Theatrical Stage Employees Local 7
- SMART Local 9
- Teamsters Local 455
- IBEW Locals 68, 111, and 113
- Laborers' International Union of North America Local 720
- UA Plumbers Local 3

Organizations

- EMILYs List
- End Citizens United
- Giffords
- Vote Mama
- Progressive Democrats of America
- Progressive Democrats of Colorado
David Seligman

State legislators

- Mike Weissman, state senator from the 28th district (2025–present)
- Chris deGruy Kennedy, former speaker pro tempore of the Colorado House of Representatives (2023–2025) from the 30th district (2023–2025) and 23rd district (2017–2023)
- Morgan Carroll, former chair of the Colorado Democratic Party (2017–2023) and President of the Colorado Senate (2013–2015) from the 29th district (2009–2017)

Labor unions

- Communications Workers of America Local 7777
- UFCW Local 7

Organizations

- Our Revolution

Political parties

- Colorado Working Families Party

=== Polling ===
Poll source	Date(s) administered	Sample size (Note: Key: A – all adults RV – registered voters LV – likely voters V – unclear)	Margin of error	Hetal Doshi	Michael Dougherty	Crisanta Duran	Jena Griswold	David Seligman	Undecided
Global Strategy Group (D) (Note: Poll sponsored by Griswold's campaign)	June 9–11, 2025	600 (LV)	± 4.0%	1%	8%	2%	42%	4%	42%

=== Results ===
Primary results by county: Griswold: 30–40%; 40–50%; 50–60%; 60–70%; 70–80%; Dougherty: 30–40%; Tie: 40–50%

Democratic primary results
Party	Candidate	Votes	%
Democratic	Jena Griswold	385,788	44.2
Democratic	David Seligman	172,829	19.8
Democratic	Michael Dougherty	170,269	19.5
Democratic	Hetal Doshi	143,662	16.5
Total votes		872,548	100.0

== Republican primary ==
=== Candidates ===
To move forward to the primary, candidates had to petition onto the ballot or achieve 30% or more at the Colorado Republican Party State Assembly. No candidates pursued petitioning onto the primary ballot. Both candidates went through the State Assembly process. Michael Allen and David Wilson were the only candidates to achieve 30% or more.

==== Nominee ====
- Michael Allen, district attorney for the 4th judicial district (2021–present)

==== Eliminated in primary ====
- David Willson, attorney

==== Eliminated at convention ====
- Connor Pennington

=== Results ===
Primary results by county: Allen: 50–60%; 60–70%; Willson: 50–60%

Republican primary results
Party	Candidate	Votes	%
Republican	Michael Allen	287,516	59.9
Republican	David Willson	192,529	40.1
Total votes		480,045	100.0

== General election ==
=== Predictions ===
Source	Ranking	As of
Sabato's Crystal Ball	Safe D	October 30, 2026

=== Post-primary endorsements ===
Jena Griswold (D)

Organizations

- Everytown for Gun Safety

=== Polling ===
Poll source	Date(s) administered	Sample size	Margin of error	Jena Griswold (D)	Michael Allen (R)	Other	Undecided
CU Boulder/YouGov	October 9–20, 2026	710 (LV)	± 4.5%	55%	40%	5% (Note: "I would not vote" with 4%; "Other" with 1%)	—

=== Results ===
2026 Colorado Attorney General election
Party	Candidate	Votes	%	±%
Democratic	Jena Griswold			
Republican	Michael J. Allen			
Total votes			100.0%	
Democratic hold				

== See also ==
- 2026 Colorado elections
