= 2026 Colorado gubernatorial election =

- November 3, 2026
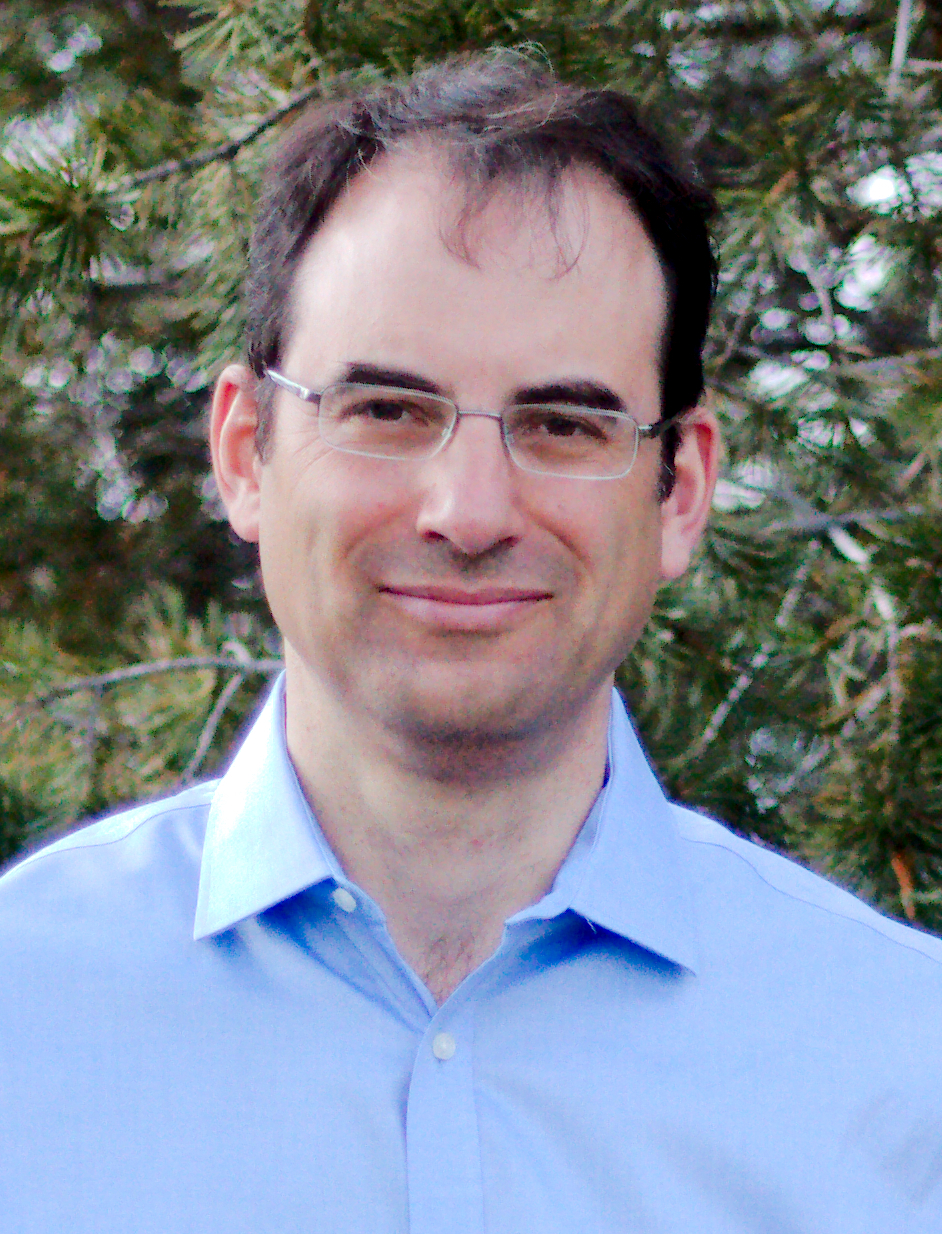

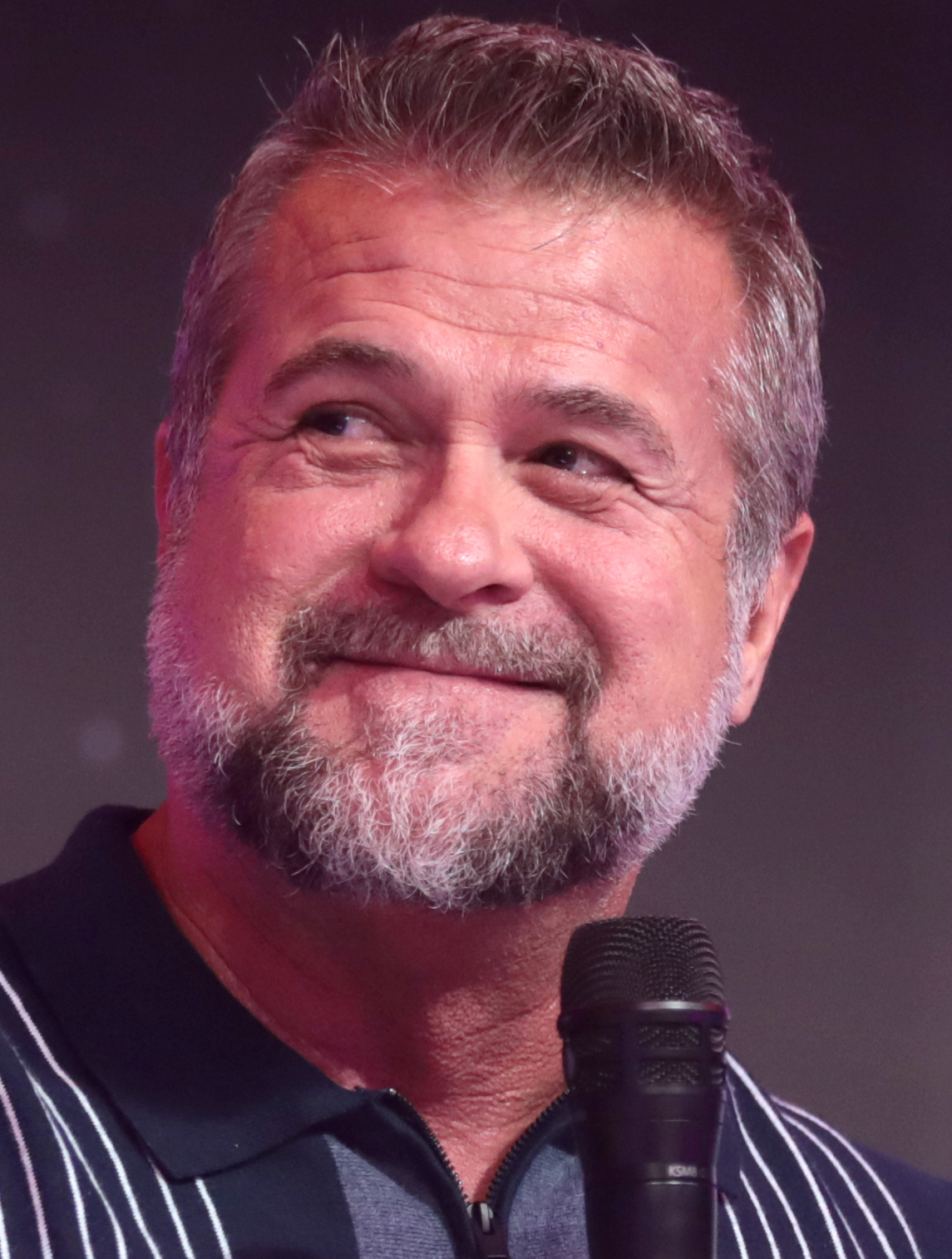
| Nominee | Phil Weiser | Victor Marx |
| Party | Democratic | Republican |
| Running mate | Lesley Dahlkemper | George Markert |
| Popular vote | 1,639,109 | 890,472 |
| Percentage | 61.13% | 33.21% |
- Weiser: 40–50% 50–60% 60–70% 70–80% 80–90% Marx: 40–50% 50–60% 60–70% 70–80%
Governor before election
Jared Polis
Democratic
Elected Governor
Phil Weiser
Democratic

The 2026 Colorado gubernatorial election was held on November 3, 2026, to elect the governor of Colorado. Incumbent Democratic governor Jared Polis is ineligible to seek re-election to a third consecutive term. Primary elections took place on June 30, 2026. Colorado Attorney General Phil Weiser defeated Republican nominee and Marine Corps veteran Victor Marx.

In the Democratic primary, Colorado Attorney General Weiser defeated U.S. senator Michael Bennet. Weiser will be the second consecutive Jewish governor after Polis. The Republican Party has not won a gubernatorial election in Colorado since 2002 nor a statewide office since 2016. Republican nominee Marx's candidacy was mired in controversy; Marx has made a number of dubious claims and has notably stated he is unsure how many people he has killed. Leading to the Republican primary, both of Marx's opponents indicated they would refuse to endorse him if he won the nomination.

== Democratic primary ==
=== Candidates ===
To move forward to the primary, candidates had to petition onto the ballot or achieve 30% or more at the Colorado Democratic Party State Assembly. Michael Bennet was the only candidate to petition onto the primary ballot. All other candidates went through the State Assembly process. Phil Weiser was the only candidate to achieve 30% or more. Bennet's petition was deemed sufficient on March 24, 2026.

==== Nominee ====
- Phil Weiser, attorney general of Colorado (2019–present)
  - Running mate: Lesley Dahlkemper, Jefferson County commissioner

==== Eliminated in primary ====
- Michael Bennet, U.S. senator (2009–present)

==== Declined ====
- Jason Crow, U.S. representative for Colorado's 6th congressional district (2019–present) (running for re-election; endorsed Bennet)
- Jena Griswold, secretary of state of Colorado (2019–present) (running for attorney general)
- Mike Johnston, mayor of Denver (2023–present) and candidate for governor in 2018 (endorsed Bennet)
- Joe Neguse, U.S. representative for Colorado's 2nd congressional district (2019–present) and nominee for secretary of state in 2014 (running for re-election; endorsed Bennet)

=== Endorsements ===
Michael Bennet

U.S. senators

- John Hickenlooper, Colorado (2021–present)

U.S. representatives

- Jason Crow, CO-06 (2019–present)
- Joe Neguse, CO-02 (2019–present)
- Brittany Pettersen, CO-07 (2023–present)

State legislators

- Brianna Buentello, former HD-47 (2019–2021)
- James Coleman, president of the Colorado Senate (2025–present) from SD-33 (2021–present)
- Daneya Esgar, former majority leader of the Colorado House of Representatives (2021–2023) from HD-46 (2015–2023)
- Steve Fenberg, former president of the Colorado Senate (2022–2025) from SD-18 (2017–2025)
- Leroy Garcia, former president of the Colorado Senate (2019–2022) from SD-03 (2015–2022)
- Nick Hinrichsen, SD-03 (2022–present)
- Tisha Mauro, HD-46 (2023–present)
- Julie McCluskie, speaker of the Colorado House of Representatives (2023–present) from HD-13 (2019–present)
- Sal Pace, former HD-46 (2009–2012)

Local officials

- Michael Hancock, former mayor of Denver (2011–2023)
- Mike Johnston, mayor of Denver (2023–present)
- Wellington Webb, former mayor of Denver (1991–2003)

Labor unions

- Colorado Professional Fire Fighters
- UA Pipefitters Union Local 208
Phil Weiser

Executive branch officials

- Federico Peña, former secretary of energy (1997–1998)

U.S. senators

- Tim Wirth, former Colorado (1987–1993)

U.S. representatives

- Ed Perlmutter, former CO-07 (2007–2023)
- David Skaggs, former CO-02 (1987–1999)

Statewide officials

- Roy Romer, former governor of Colorado (1987–1999)

State legislators

- Morgan Carroll, former president of the Colorado Senate (2015–2017) from SD-29 (2013–2019)
- Terrance Carroll, former speaker of the Colorado House of Representatives (2009–2011) from HD-07 (2003–2011)
- Javier Mabrey, HD-01 (2023–present)
- Brandon Shaffer, former president of the Colorado Senate (2009–2013) from SD-17 (2005–2013)

Local officials

- Jennifer Arndt, former mayor of Fort Collins (2021–2026)

Individuals

- Dottie Lamm, former first lady of Colorado (1975–1987)

Labor unions

- UFCW Local 7

Organizations

- Indivisible Colorado

Newspapers

- The Durango Herald

=== Polling ===
| Poll source | Date(s) administered | Sample size (Note: Key: A – all adults RV – registered voters LV – likely voters V – unclear) | Margin of error | Michael Bennet | Phil Weiser | Undecided |
|---|---|---|---|---|---|---|
| Public Policy Polling (D) (Note: Poll sponsored by Fighting For Colorado PAC, which supports Weiser) | June 24–25, 2026 | 600 (LV) | ± 4.0% | 36% | 45% | 19% |
| Public Policy Polling (D) | June 1–2, 2026 | 505 (LV) | ± 4.4% | 36% | 30% | 34% |
| Tavern Research (Note: Poll sponsored by Rocky Mountain Way PAC, which supports Bennett) | May 31 – June 1, 2026 | (LV) | – | 35% | 28% | 36% |
| Colorado Community Research | May 22–28, 2026 | 796 (LV) | ± 4.0% | 34% | 41% | 25% |
| Keating Research (Note: Poll sponsored by Colorado Professional Fire Fighters, which supports Bennet) | January 26 – February 1, 2026 | 800 (LV) | ± 3.5% | 53% | 26% | 21% |
| Global Strategy Group (D) (Note: Poll sponsored by Bennet's campaign) | June 9–11, 2025 | 600 (LV) | ± 4.0% | 53% | 22% | 25% |

Hypothetical polling

| Poll source | Date(s) administered | Sample size | Margin of error | Jena Griswold | Joe Neguse | Ken Salazar | Phil Weiser | Other | Undecided |
|---|---|---|---|---|---|---|---|---|---|
| Healthier Colorado (D)/ Magellan Strategies (R) | December 4–9, 2024 | 630 (LV) | ± 3.9% | 16% | 20% | 11% | 8% | 8% | 37% |

=== Debates ===
2026 gubernatorial election Democratic primary debates
| No. | Date | Host | Moderator | Link | Democratic | Democratic |
| Key: P Participant A Absent N Not invited I Invited W Withdrawn | | | | | | |
| Key: P Participant A Absent N Not invited I Invited W Withdrawn | | | | | Michael Bennet | Phil Weiser |
|---|---|---|---|---|---|---|
| 1 | May 7, 2026 | Colorado Public Radio; KMGH-TV; The Denver Post | Colette Bordelon; Nick Coltrain; Ryan Warner | YouTube | P | P |
| 2 | Jun. 4, 2026 | Colorado Politics; KUSA; University of Denver | Kyle Clark; Marshall Zelinger | YouTube | P | P |

=== Results ===
Primary results by county: Weiser: 50–60%; 60–70%; Bennet: 50–60%; 60–70%; 70–80%; 80–90%

Democratic primary results
| Party | Candidate | Votes | % |
|---|---|---|---|
| Democratic | Phil Weiser | 505,444 | 56.9 |
| Democratic | Michael Bennet | 383,131 | 43.1 |
| Total votes | | 888,575 | 100.0 |

== Republican primary ==
=== Candidates ===
To move forward to the primary, candidates had to petition onto the ballot or achieve 30% or more at the Colorado Republican Party State Assembly. Barbara Kirkmeyer was the only candidate to petition onto the primary ballot. Her petition was deemed sufficient on April 15, 2026. All other candidates went through the State Assembly process. Scott Bottoms and Victor Marx were the only candidates to achieve 30% or more.

==== Nominee ====
- Victor Marx, ministry leader
  - Running mate: George Markert, AI strategic advisor

==== Eliminated in primary ====
- Scott Bottoms, state representative from the 15th district (2023–present)
- Barbara Kirkmeyer, state senator from the 23rd district (2021–present), candidate for Colorado's 4th congressional district in 2014, and nominee for Colorado's 8th congressional district in 2022

==== Eliminated at convention ====
- Jason Clark, money manager, candidate for governor in 2014 and independent candidate in 2010
- Joshua Griffin, research and development firm founder and candidate for Colorado's 5th congressional district in 2024
- Will McBride, attorney
- Jason Mikesell, Teller County sheriff

==== Withdrawn ====
- Mark Baisley, state senator from the 4th district (2023–present) (running for U.S. senate)
- Greg Lopez, former U.S. representative from Colorado's 4th congressional district (2024–2025) and candidate for governor in 2018 and 2022 (running as an Independent)
- Joe Oltmann, podcaster

=== Endorsements ===
Barbara Kirkmeyer

U.S. representatives

- Gabe Evans, CO-08 (2025–present)
- Scott McInnis, former CO-03 (1993–2005)

Statewide officials

- Bill Owens, former governor of Colorado (1999–2007)

Local officials

- Mike Coffman, mayor of Aurora (2019–present)
- John Suthers, former Mayor of Colorado Springs (2015-2023)

Newspapers

- Colorado Springs Gazette
- Denver Gazette
Victor Marx

Executive branch officials

- Michael Flynn, former national security advisor (2017)

U.S. representatives

- Lauren Boebert, CO-04 (2021–present)

Individuals

- Ted Nugent, rock musician
- Derek Wolfe, former NFL player

=== Polling ===
| Poll source | Date(s) administered | Sample size | Margin of error | Scott Bottoms | Victor Marx | Barbara Kirkmeyer | Undecided |
|---|---|---|---|---|---|---|---|
| Cygnal (R) (Note: Poll sponsored by Freedom IEC, which supports Marx) | May 7–8, 2026 | 600 (LV) | ± 4.0% | 7% | 42% | 13% | 38% |

=== Debates ===
2026 gubernatorial election Republican primary debates
| No. | Date | Host | Moderator | Link | Republican | Republican | Republican |
| Key: P Participant A Absent N Not invited I Invited W Withdrawn | | | | | | | |
| Key: P Participant A Absent N Not invited I Invited W Withdrawn | | | | | Scott Bottoms | Barbara Kirkmeyer | Victor Marx |
|---|---|---|---|---|---|---|---|
| 1 | May 14, 2026 | Colorado Public Radio; KMGH-TV; The Denver Post | John Aguilar; Colette Bordelon; Bazi Kanani | YouTube | P | P | A |
| 2 | Jun. 2, 2026 | Colorado Politics; KUSA; University of Denver | Kyle Clark; Marshall Zelinger | YouTube | P | P | P |

=== Results ===
Primary results by county: Marx: 30–40%; 40–50%; 50–60%; Kirkmeyer: 30–40%; 40–50%; 50–60%; Bottoms: 30–40%

Republican primary results
| Party | Candidate | Votes | % |
|---|---|---|---|
| Republican | Victor Marx | 208,455 | 39.9 |
| Republican | Barbara Kirkmeyer | 205,990 | 39.4 |
| Republican | Scott Bottoms | 108,529 | 20.8 |
| Total votes | | 522,974 | 100.0 |

== Unity primary ==
=== Candidates ===
==== Nominee ====
- Jeff Peckman, UFO disclosure activist

==== Eliminated in primary ====
- Paul Noel Fiorino, ballet instructor and perennial candidate

=== Results ===
Unity primary results
| Party | Candidate | Votes | % |
|---|---|---|---|
| Unity | Jeff Peckman | 146 | 53.7 |
| Unity | Paul Noel Fiorino | 126 | 46.3 |
| Total votes | | 272 | 100.0 |

== Third-party candidates ==
=== Candidates ===
==== Declared ====
- Stephen Hamilton (American Constitution)
- Eric Mulder (Libertarian)
- Erik Underwood (Approval Voting)

==== Withdrawn ====
- Frederick Osborne, actor (No Labels)

== Independents ==
=== Candidates ===
==== Declared ====
- Greg Lopez, former U.S. representative from Colorado's 4th congressional district (2024–2025) and candidate for governor in 2018 and 2022 (previously ran as a Republican)
  - Running mate: Taralyn Romero, property-rights advocate

==== Filed paperwork ====
- Jon Collamer
- Bradley Allen Wall

==== Withdrawn ====
- Shawn Bennett

==== Declined ====
- Kent Thiry, former CEO of DaVita

== General election ==
=== Predictions ===
| Source | Ranking | As of |
|---|---|---|
| The Cook Political Report | Solid D | October 29, 2026 |
| Decision Desk HQ | Likely D | November 3, 2026 |
| Fox News | Solid D | November 1, 2026 |
| Inside Elections | Solid D | October 29, 2026 |
| NBC News | Solid D | November 3, 2026 |
| RealClearPolitics | Solid D | November 1, 2026 |
| Sabato's Crystal Ball | Safe D | November 2, 2026 |
| Silver Bulletin | Solid D | November 3, 2026 |

=== Post-primary endorsements ===
Phil Weiser (D)

U.S. representatives

- Ken Buck, former CO-04 (2015–2024) (Republican)

Organizations

- Everytown for Gun Safety

=== Polling ===
| Poll source | Date(s) administered | Sample size | Margin of error | Phil Weiser (D) | Victor Marx (R) | Other | Undecided |
|---|---|---|---|---|---|---|---|
| Keating Research (D) | November 1–2, 2026 | 400 (LV) | ± 4.9% | 59% | 33% | 4% (Note: "Other candidate" with 4%) | 4% |
| Research Co. | October 31 – November 2, 2026 | 450 (LV) | ± 4.6% | 53% | 38% | 2% (Note: "Some other candidate" with 2%) | 7% |
| CU Boulder/YouGov | October 9–20, 2026 | 710 (LV) | ± 4.5% | 57% | 37% | 7% (Note: "I would not vote" with 4%; "Other" with 3%) | — |
| Lake Research Partners (D) (Note: Poll sponsored by the Ballot Initiative Strategy Center.) | September 16–30, 2026 | 600 (RV) | — | 51% | 36% | 3% | 10% |

=== Results ===
2026 Colorado gubernatorial election
| Party | Candidate | Votes | % | ±% |
|---|---|---|---|---|
| Democratic | Phil Weiser; Lesley Dahlkemper | 1,639,109 | 61.13 | +2.60% |
| Republican | Victor Marx; George Washington Markert | 890,472 | 33.21 | −5.97% |
| Independent | Greg Lopez; Taralyn Romero | 74,134 | 2.76 | N/A |
| Libertarian | Erik Mulder; Wayne Harlos | 44,643 | 1.67 | +0.52% |
| American Constitution | Stephen T. Hamilton; James K. Treibert | 17,340 | 0.65 | −0.21% |
| Approval Voting | Erik Underwood; Frank Atwood | 9,533 | 0.36 | N/A |
| Unity | Jeff Peckman; T.J. Cole | 6,013 | 0.22 | −0.05% |
| Total votes | | 2,681,244 | 100.0 | |
| Democratic hold | | | | |

Counties that flipped from Republican to Democratic

- Douglas (largest municipality: Castle Rock)
- El Paso (largest municipality: Colorado Springs)
- Las Animas (largest municipality: Trinidad)

== See also ==
- 2026 United States Senate election in Colorado

== Notes ==
Partisan clients
