= Scott Bottoms =

American politician

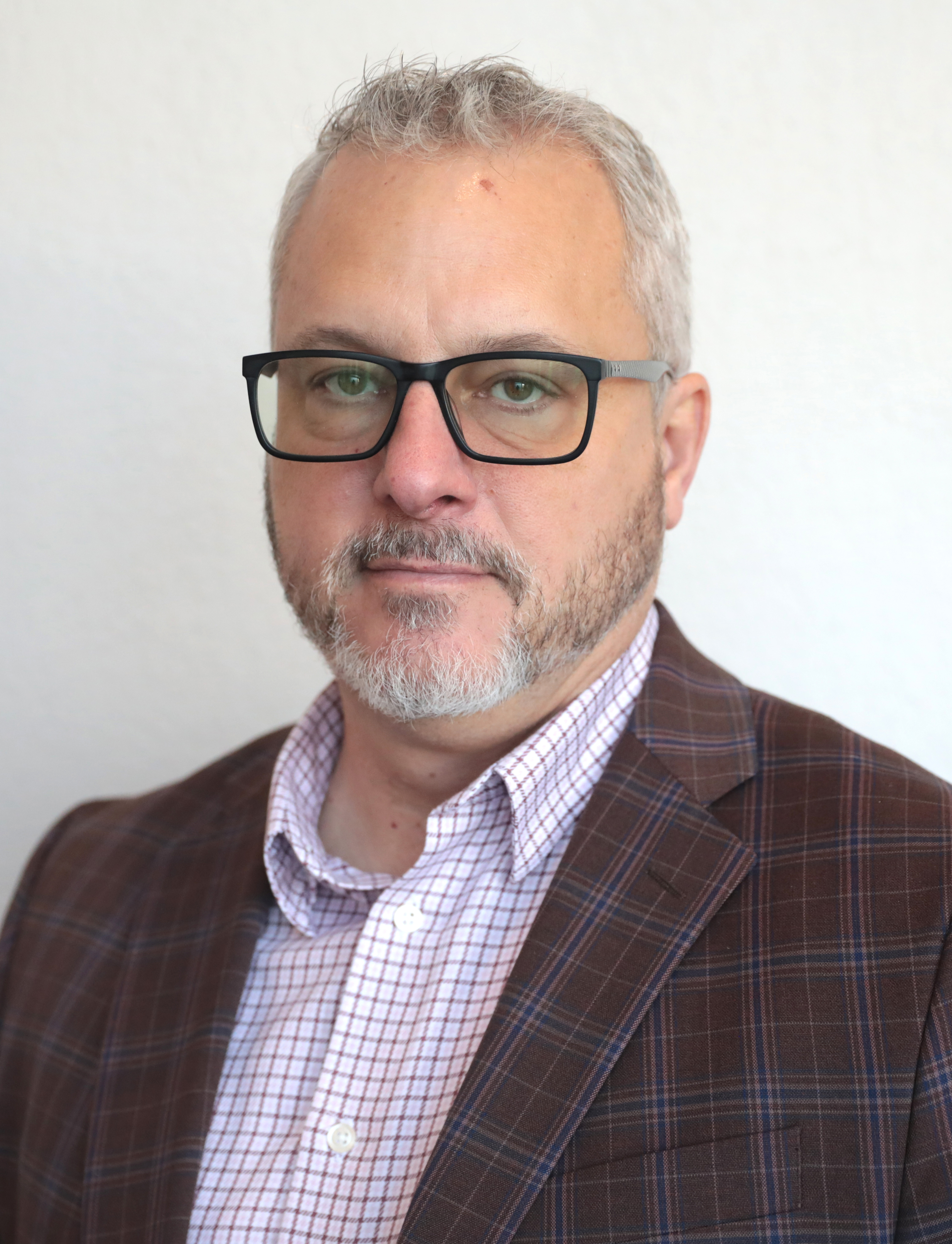
- Bottoms in 2022

Member of the Colorado House of Representatives from the 15th district
- Incumbent
- Assumed office January 9, 2023
- Preceded by: Dave Williams

Personal details
- Born: Scott Thomas Bottoms Colorado, U.S.
- Party: Republican
- Education: Nelson University (BA); Denver Seminary (MA); Assemblies of God Theological Seminary (DMin)
- Website: Campaign website

Scott T. Bottoms is an American politician who is a Colorado state representative from Colorado Springs. A Republican, Bottoms represents Colorado House of Representatives District 15, which includes much of eastern Colorado Springs and Cimarron Hills in El Paso County.

== Background ==
Bottoms, a United States Navy veteran, is the pastor of the Church At Briargate in Colorado Springs' Briargate neighborhood.

== Political career ==
Bottoms is considered one of the most conservative members in the state legislature. He has previously described himself as part of the political far-right and as "anti-establishment". Bottoms called abortion and transgender rights "demonic" while running for state representative in 2022. He has also falsely claimed that Planned Parenthood sells the body parts of aborted fetuses and that during the January 6 attack of the Capitol, the FBI "lured" the rioters into the building. Bottoms has also promoted election-related conspiracy theories. In 2026, Bottoms claimed that he was working with the FBI since 2023 to uncover three separate pedophile rings at the State Capitol — one each in the Office of Governor, State House and State Senate.

In May 2026, following Colorado Governor Jared Polis's commutation of the sentence of Tina Peters, convicted of multiple felonies for her involvement in attempts to overturn the 2020 United States presidential election, Bottoms praised Polis's decision, claiming that Peters never committed any crimes, as well as promising to give Peters a full pardon and make it possible for her to sue the state of Colorado over her prosecution and conviction.

In January 20, 2025, Bottoms announced his candidacy for the 2026 Colorado gubernatorial election. During the campaign, Bottoms said that he had insider information that Governor Jared Polis, Colorado Attorney General Phil Weiser and Colorado Secretary of State Jena Griswold would be indicted for treason. Bottoms said there would "probably" be a role in his gubernatorial administration for Joe Oltmann, an antisemitic, conservative podcaster.

== Elections ==
=== 2022 ===
In the 2022 Colorado House of Representatives election, Bottoms defeated his Democratic Party and Libertarian Party opponents, winning 56.76% of the total votes cast.

=== 2024 ===
Bottoms ran for re-election in 2024. In the Republican primary election held June 25, 2024, he ran unopposed. In the general election held November 5, 2024, Bottoms defeated his Democratic Party opponent, winning 57.99% of the vote.
