= Victor Marx =

American political candidate (born 1965)

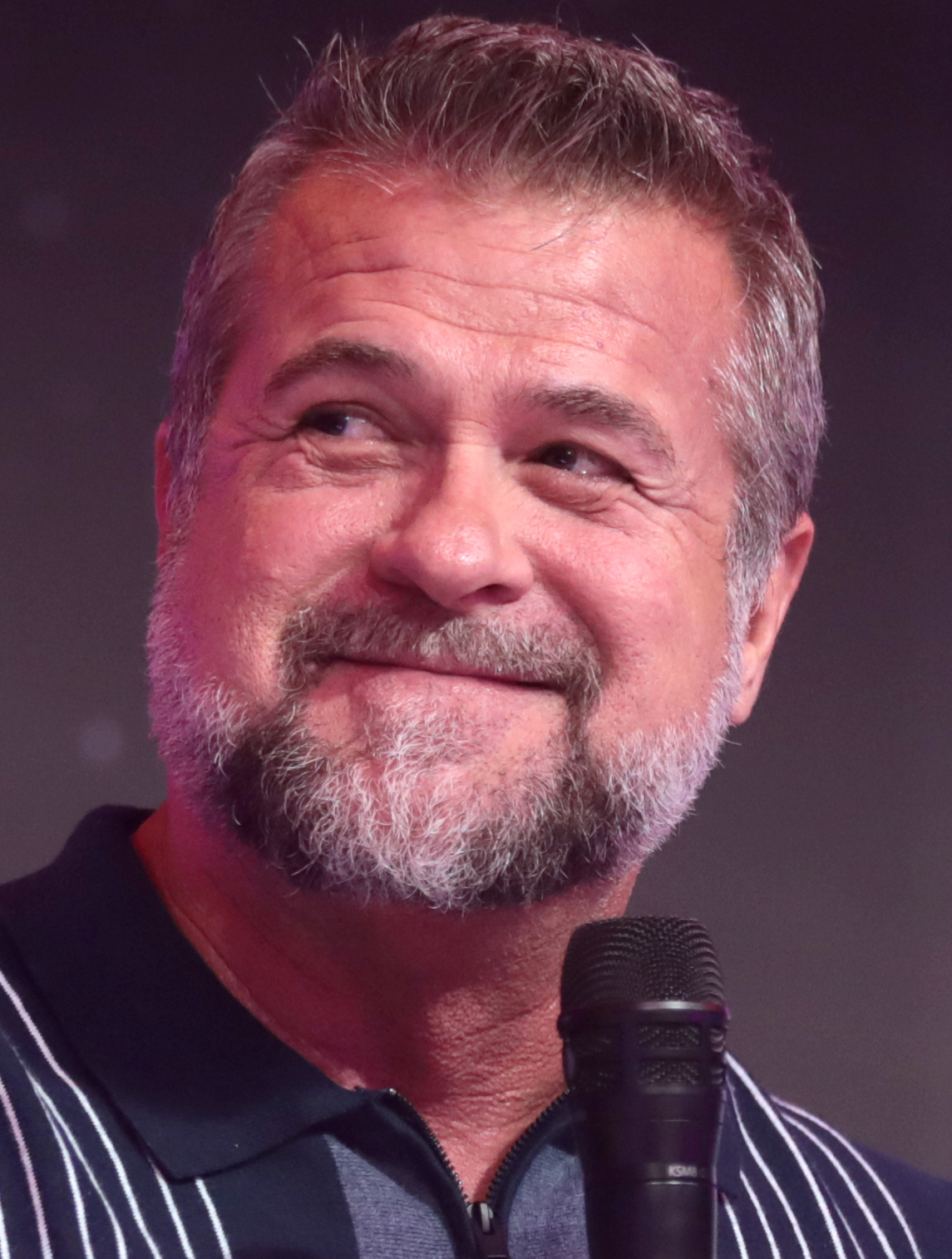
- Marx in 2022
- Born: July 5, 1965 (age 61); Lafayette, Louisiana, U.S.
- Political party: Republican
- Spouse: Eileen Marx (m. 1987)
- Children: 5
- Military career
- Allegiance: United States
- Branch: United States Marine Corps
- Service years: 1983–1986
- Unit: 9th Communication Battalion
- Website: Campaign website

Victor Marx (born July 5, 1965) is an American author, minister, Marine Corps veteran, and political candidate. He was the Republican nominee for governor of Colorado in the 2026 election, where he faced the Democratic nominee Phil Weiser. Marx has made several claims about his life and background that have been seen as sensational and controversial, while the validity of many of his claims has been questioned or disproven.

== Early life and education ==
Marx was born to a man named Karl Marx and a young mother in Lafayette, Louisiana, where he also grew up. He has three older siblings, the first of whom was born when Marx's mother was 16. Marx says he is a survivor of child abuse. Marx claimed that, when he was three years old, his stepfather forced him to behead a cat and wear its carcass on his head. As a child, Marx moved frequently, living in 17 different homes and attending 14 different schools.

Marx alleged that at age seven, his abusive stepfather drove him at night to a rural area of Mendenhall, Mississippi, and made him shoot and kill a man. Mississippi sheriffs and police in the area have said there is no record of any unsolved homicides from that time. Marx claimed he contacted the Federal Bureau of Investigation and the local sheriff's office, neither of which could solve the case as Marx was unable to provide many details. There is no evidence that Marx ever contacted authorities. Marx mentioned in an interview with Colorado news station 9News that he is unsure how many people he has killed, and that he thinks the exact details do not need to be clarified.

== Career ==
He served for three years in the United States Marine Corps from 1983 to 1986. He was inspired to do so after the 1983 Beirut barracks bombings. Towards the end of his service in the Marine Corps, Marx reunited with his biological father, who spurred his conversion to Christianity. Marx was an assistant for three years at James Dobson's Evangelical Christian organization Focus on the Family.

Marx founded All Things Possible Ministries in 2003. Marx claimed on his campaign website that All Things Possible rescued 45,000 women and children from abuse, which was later removed from his campaign website after being disproved. Marx has since declined to give an exact number of survivors saved in order to not "put people in danger".

As part of his ministry, Marx has said that he routinely encountered and exorcised demons from people, including from individuals he claimed were possessed due to the influence of pornography or being an unmarried couple living together. These exorcisms were sometimes done over the phone. On a 2023 episode of Alex Clark's podcast, he claimed that he "hunts demons" and recalled a time when his dog supposedly identified a demonic presence in a couple resting at a pool, where he claims he then exorcised the woman from "five demons that had been assigned to her".

Marx was reportedly friends with conservative political commentator Charlie Kirk. He was a guest on an episode of Kirk's podcast in 2022, and has spoken at many Turning Point USA events.

== 2026 Colorado gubernatorial campaign ==
On October 1, 2025, he announced his campaign for governor of Colorado. Marx has said that his wife encouraged him to do so. He ran in the Republican primary for the 2026 Colorado gubernatorial election against state senator Barbara Kirkmeyer and state representative Scott Bottoms. Marx won nearly 40% of the vote at the Republican state assembly in April 2026. Marx's campaign has received $2.5 million in donations, more than Kirkmeyer's and Bottoms's campaigns combined. Marx skipped many of the Republican debates during his campaign, a decision that Paul Teske, a professor of public affairs at the University of Colorado Denver, called "unusual". Marx originally agreed to attend a debate on May 26, 2026. However, one of the debate moderators, KOA NewsRadio host Michael Brown, sent Marx a long list of claims he requested Marx prove. These claims included ministry work in the Middle East and Haiti, a gun battle with ISIS, and his martial arts credentials. Marx rejected Brown's request, calling it "a staged ambush disguised as a debate", and instead held a counter-rally to the debate. During the primary campaign, Kirkmeyer and Bottoms criticized Marx for avoiding debates.

Marx was questioned about his past claims in an interview with 9News anchor Kyle Clark in June 2026. He denied claiming to have performed "more than 130 missions" in 30 countries rescuing women and children or to have called in an airstrike as a civilian that killed 70 ISIS fighters.

Leading to the June primary, Kirkmeyer and Bottoms indicated they would refuse to endorse Marx if he won the GOP nomination. Kirkmeyer believed he was unfit to be governor and a "disaster for our state", while Bottoms said that Marx was a "con man". Marx narrowly won the June 30 Republican primary with the race called about a week later on July 9, and faced Democratic candidate and Colorado Attorney General Phil Weiser in the November general election.

Soon after Marx was declared the GOP nominee, he circulated a loyalty pledge so the other Republican candidates can sign to indicate their support for his campaign. As of July 15, most of the statewide Republican candidates had not publicly signed the pledge. On July 15, Marx claimed in a talk radio show that former Republican governor Bill Owens endorsed him in the Governor's race, saying "I got a call yesterday that he's endorsing me". In a statement, Owens responded that he has not officially endorsed Marx, saying he intends to wait to see how Marx's campaign unfolds. Marx's candidacy has led to tensions within the state GOP, with several Republicans refusing to support Marx's campaign while others urging the party to back Marx. In late July, Marx selected Marine veteran George Markert as his running mate.

Marx's campaign has faced several allegations of breaking campaign finance laws. On July 27, Marx's campaign was alleged to have violated state campaign finance laws according to state election officials, and was accused of accepting over 100 improper contributions during the primary election that exceeded the legal amount. Marx's campaign said they were working with state officials on the matter, while Marx called the violations a "nothing burger". In a September hearing with election officials, Marx's campaign admitted to accepting improper contributions and not fully refunding the excess amount along with failing to provide adequate evidence for completed refunds. The campaign will face a fine which may be as much as $420,000.

In late July, Marx announced to his supporters that they can buy campaign merchandise via a new website to bypass campaign finance restrictions on individuals donating more than $3,500 to a single campaign. During an online campaign event, Marx said "If they order merchandise, there's no limit on that. They can order as much as they want. That will really help us." 9News reported that the new online store directly links through Marx's official campaign website, that the merchandise on the new store mirrors items found in the official campaign website and that the site does not mention typical campaign donation disclosures. According to several campaign finance experts contacted by 9News, it may be legally dubious whether it complies with campaign finance laws and raises uncertainty whether the money is going to Marx's campaign, to himself, or to another group. On August 14, state election officials notified Marx's campaign that they found "one or more potential violations of Colorado campaign and political finance law" that need be fixed by the end of the month or potentially face fines. Around August 28, the website became inaccessible and Marx denied involvement, saying "I don't have anything to do with it" when contacted about the website by 9News. Complaints were sent to election officials over the alleged violations and were reportedly under review as of early September. On October 2, a hearing officer determined that Marx owed $57,000 for campaign finance violations. That decision goes to the Secretary of State for a final decision.

On November 3rd, 2026, Marx lost the general election to Weiser, who will be Colorado's next governor. Marx conceded the election in a Facebook post later that evening. Marx received 34% of the vote as opposed to Weiser's 61%.

== Political positions ==
David Corn of Mother Jones has described Marx as a Christian fundamentalist. Some political observers, including other Republicans, have voiced criticism that Marx has generally avoided giving specifics on policies and has not discussed such matters in detail. During the primary, Marx stated he intentionally avoided detailed policy discussions, saying that voters should focus on his background instead. According to a Colorado Newsline article, "Along with debates, Marx has largely eschewed offering specifics about the policy agenda he would pursue as governor, decrying the 'empty promises' made by too many politicians on the campaign trail".

Marx has said if elected as Colorado governor he would cut regulations to expand housing and childcare, as well as increasing energy production to lower gas and utility costs. He has stated a commitment to protecting TABOR in Colorado. On affordability issues, Colorado Newsline reported that Marx offered a "vague answer" to moderators during a debate then elaborated that he would "negotiate with people to accomplish a greater good." Marx has proposed a pause on regulations and a cap on property taxes.

Marx strongly supports the Second Amendment. As Colorado governor, he has said that he would codify Second Amendment rights directly into the Colorado State Constitution in case the federal Second Amendment may be altered.

Marx opposes Flock Safety cameras.

In spite of Colorado laws prohibiting such a policy, Marx has stated he wants to cooperate with federal immigration enforcement, such as ICE. He intends to oppose sanctuary city policies and establish a "Border-Related Crime Strike Force". Marx endeavors to launch task forces on fentanyl and trafficking networks.

Marx strongly opposes abortion. In August 2026, Marx compared abortion to "spiritual warfare" and said about Colorado's abortion protections: "This state, they kill babies. Wholesale slaughter." Marx's running mate George Markert has said that he and Marx will attempt to eliminate abortion protections in the state if elected.

== Personal life ==
Marx has five children and five grandchildren. Marx met his wife Eileen through a mutual interest in martial arts. Eileen is a fitness kickboxer. Following their marriage, they opened a gym. A pastor in Honolulu enticed Marx and his wife to move there to start a Christian karate school. Marx spent many years in Hawaii, living there from 1995 to 2001. He began feeling suicidal, and he checked himself into The Queen's Medical Center. While living in Honolulu, his children learned Hawaiian Pidgin.

In 2023, Marx's brother-in-law, Kenneth Breining, shot at Marx from inside the trailer he was living in on Marx's property. Marx was not hit. Breining was taken to an El Paso County jail and later bonded out. In 2024, Breining was suspected of murdering his girlfriend in Nevada County, California, where he remains in jail.

Inspired by the 1983 Chuck Norris film Lone Wolf McQuade, Marx has posted social media videos in which he disarms people holding dummy firearms.

In 2026, controversial recordings of Marx on a podcast with Byron Rodgers resurfaced wherein he talked about slamming his wife into the front door of their home, giving her a "decent, bouncing push," that led to her "bent over, ...crying." A second recording from Marx's own podcast in 2020 also resurfaced, wherein he discussed a past incident in which he "snatched up and threw [his toddler son] across the room." Marx described himself as feeling as though "God gave [Marx] a gift for violence," in a third recording from a 2023 Turning Point USA Pastors Summit.

== Bibliography ==
- Marx, Victor (2013). With God, All Things Are Possible: The Victor Marx Story. Yeka: Onesimus Publishing. ASIN B0719651HT.
- Marx, Victor (2024). The Dangerous Gentleman: A Call for Men to be Courageous in a Culture of Fear. Yeka: Onesimus Publishing. ISBN 979-8990063235.

== See also ==
- 2026 Colorado gubernatorial election

Party political offices
Preceded by Heidi Ganahl	Republican nominee for Governor of Colorado; 2026	Most recent
