= 2022 Colorado Attorney General election =

- November 8, 2022
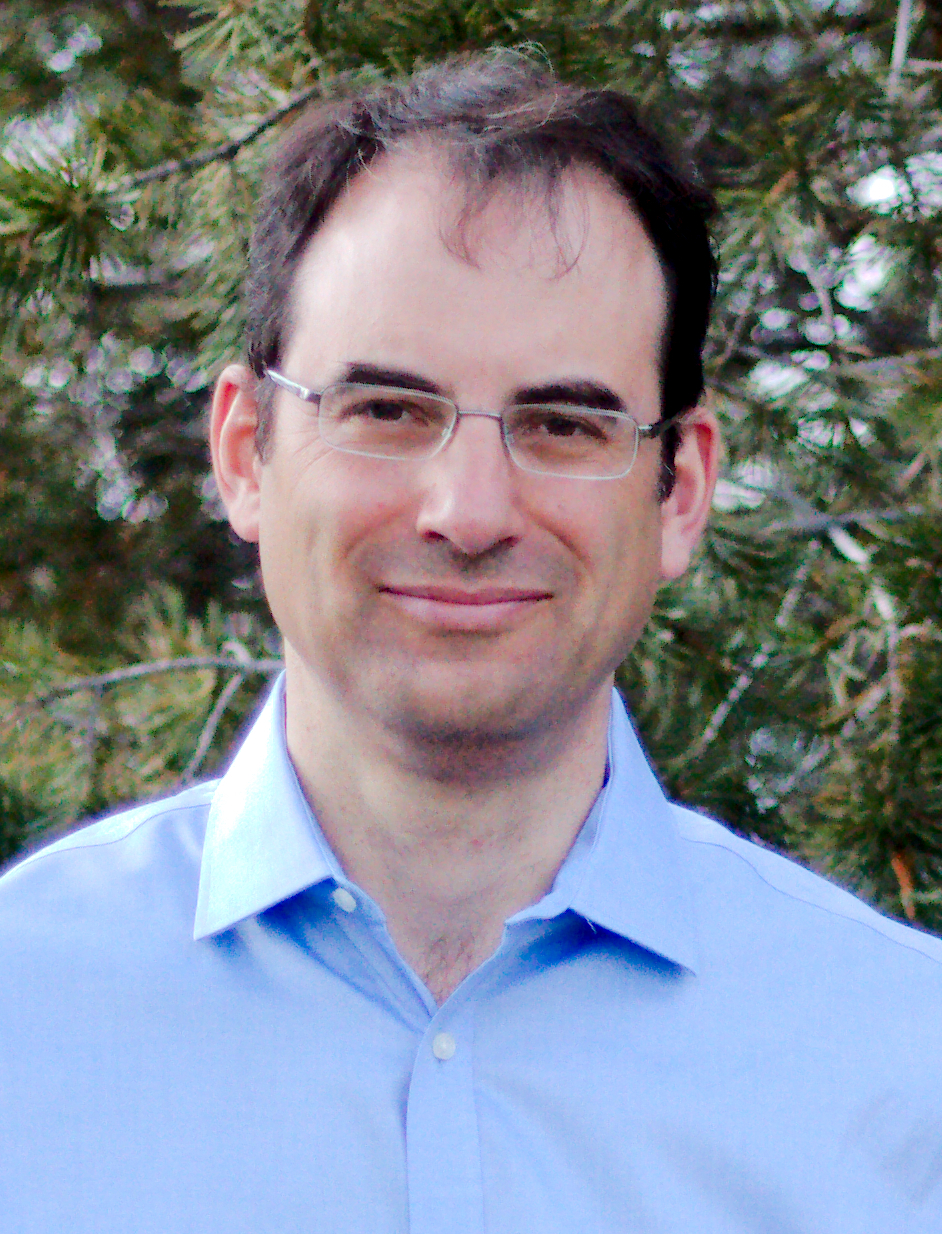

Nominee	Phil Weiser	John Kellner
Party	Democratic	Republican
Popular vote	1,349,133	1,060,866
Percentage	54.74%	43.04%
- Weiser: 40–50% 50–60% 60–70% 70–80% 80–90% >90% Kellner: 40–50% 50–60% 60–70% 70–80% 80–90% >90% Tie: 40–50% No votes
Attorney General before election
Phil Weiser
Democratic
Elected Attorney General
Phil Weiser
Democratic

The 2022 Colorado Attorney General election was held on Tuesday, November 8, to elect the attorney general of Colorado. Incumbent attorney general Phil Weiser won re-election to a second term, improving on his 2018 results.

== Democratic primary ==
=== Candidates ===
==== Nominee ====
- Phil Weiser, incumbent attorney general

=== Results ===
Democratic primary results
Party	Candidate	Votes	%
Democratic	Phil Weiser (incumbent)	504,071	100.0%
Total votes		504,071	100.0%

== Republican primary ==
=== Candidates ===
==== Nominee ====
- John Kellner, district attorney for the 18th district court of Colorado

==== Disqualified ====
- Stanley Thorne (running as independent)

==== Declined ====
- Jason R. Dunn, former United States Attorney for the district of Colorado
- Mark Waller, former member of the Colorado House of Representatives from the 15th district

=== Results ===
Republican primary results
Party	Candidate	Votes	%
Republican	John Kellner	504,631	100.0%
Total votes		504,631	100.0%

== Independents ==
=== Candidates ===
==== Declared ====
- Stanley Thorne, attorney (write-in candidate)

== General election ==
=== Debate ===
2022 Colorado Attorney General debate
No.	Date	Host	Moderator	Link	Republican	Democratic
Key: P Participant A Absent N Not invited I Invited W Withdrawn						
Key: P Participant A Absent N Not invited I Invited W Withdrawn					John Kellner	Phil Weiser
1	Aug. 2, 2022	Community College of Aurora	Maisha Fields; Whitney Taylor	YouTube	P	P
2	Oct. 18, 2022	KUSA (TV)	Kyle Clark; Marshall Zelinger	YouTube	P	P

=== Predictions ===
Source	Ranking	As of
Sabato's Crystal Ball	Leans D	November 3, 2022
Elections Daily	Likely D	November 1, 2022

=== Endorsements ===
John Kellner (R)

Newspapers

- The Gazette

Organizations

- NRA Political Victory Fund
Phil Weiser (D)

State officials

- Bernie Buescher, former secretary of state of Colorado (2009–2011)
- Cynthia Coffman, former attorney general (2015–2019) (Republican)
- Rebecca Love Kourlis, former justice of the Colorado Supreme Court (1995–2006)
- Donna Lynne, former lieutenant governor of Colorado (2016–2019)
- Jared Polis, governor of Colorado (2019–present)
- Dianne Primavera, lieutenant governor of Colorado (2019–)
- Bill Ritter, former governor of Colorado (2007–2011)
- Roy Romer, former governor of Colorado (1987–1999)
- Dave Young, Colorado state treasurer (2019–)

State senators

- All 20 Democratic state senators

State representatives

- Don Coram, state representative for the 6th district (Republican)
- Russell George, former speaker of the Colorado House of Representatives (1999–2000) (Republican)
- Cole Wist, former state representative for the 37th district (Independent)
- Rob Witwer, former state representative for the 25th district (Republican)
- All 61 Democratic state representatives

Organizations

- End Citizens United
- Everytown for Gun Safety
- Let America Vote
- NARAL Pro-Choice America

Newspapers

- The Denver Post
- Sentinel Colorado

=== Polling ===
Poll source	Date(s) administered	Sample size (Note: Key: A – all adults RV – registered voters LV – likely voters V – unclear)	Margin of error	Phil Weiser (D)	John Kellner (R)	Other	Undecided
Global Strategy Group (D) (Note: This poll was sponsored by ProgressNow Colorado, a liberal nonprofit organization.)	October 6–11, 2022	800 (LV)	± 3.5%	44%	36%	7% (Note: Robinson (L) with 7%)	12%
Global Strategy Group (D)	October 6–11, 2022	800 (LV)	± 3.5%	48%	41%	–	11%
The Tarrance Group (R) (Note: This poll was sponsored by the Republican Attorneys General Association.)	August 22–25, 2022	600 (LV)	± 4.1%	44%	44%	–	12%

=== Results ===
2022 Colorado Attorney General election
Party	Candidate	Votes	%	±%
Democratic	Phil Weiser (incumbent)	1,349,133	54.74%	+3.16%
Republican	John Kellner	1,060,866	43.04%	−2.10%
Libertarian	William F. Robinson III	54,557	2.21%	−1.07%
Total votes		2,464,556	100.0%	
Democratic hold				

==== By county ====
County	Phil Weiser Democratic		John Kellner Republican		William F. Robinson III Libertarian	
County	#	%	#	%	#	%
Adams	91,442	55.75%	68,357	41.68%	4,214	2.57%
Alamosa	2,945	50.11%	2,806	47.75%	126	2.14%
Arapahoe	148,940	58.91%	96,549	38.98%	5,342	2.11%
Archuleta	3,243	42.16%	4,247	55.21%	202	2.63%
Baca	276	16.46%	1,360	81.10%	41	2.44%
Bent	578	32.11%	1,177	65.39%	45	2.50%
Boulder	125,025	77.15%	34,081	21.03%	2,945	1.82%
Broomfield	22,967	62.29%	13,182	35.75%	725	1.97%
Chaffee	6,364	54.81%	4,976	42.86%	270	2.33%
Cheyenne	106	11.86%	771	86.24%	17	1.90%
Clear Creek	2,876	56.43%	2,051	40.24%	170	3.34%
Conejos	1,594	47.29%	1,735	51.47%	42	1.25%
Costilla	1,084	66.42%	510	31.25%	38	2.33%
Crowley	358	27.29%	908	69.21%	46	3.51%
Custer	974	29.78%	2,215	67.72%	82	2.51%
Delta	5,136	32.75%	10,179	64.90%	368	2.35%
Denver	221,964	79.18%	53,321	19.02%	5,035	1.80%
Dolores	297	23.48%	925	73.12%	43	3.40%
Douglas	80,862	43.22%	102,683	54.89%	3,535	1.89%
Eagle	13,348	61.55%	7,851	36.20%	489	2.25%
El Paso	116,688	42.03%	153,731	55.37%	7,205	2.60%
Elbert	3,556	22.31%	12,068	75.73%	312	1.96%
Fremont	6,264	31.60%	13,066	65.92%	492	2.48%
Garfield	12,175	50.89%	11,113	46.45%	638	2.67%
Gilpin	1,835	54.89%	1,394	41.70%	114	3.41%
Grand	3,724	47.88%	3,844	49.43%	209	2.69%
Gunnison	5,717	64.01%	2,967	33.22%	248	2.78%
Hinsdale	204	41.55%	270	54.99%	17	3.46%
Huerfano	1,917	50.78%	1,766	46.78%	92	2.44%
Jackson	126	19.09%	513	77.73%	21	3.18%
Jefferson	171,279	57.77%	119,011	40.14%	6,188	2.09%
Kiowa	104	14.13%	620	84.24%	12	1.63%
Kit Carson	441	15.13%	2,424	83.16%	50	1.72%
La Plata	17,259	59.04%	11,265	38.54%	707	2.42%
Lake	1,694	58.43%	1,093	37.70%	112	3.86%
Larimer	98,518	56.32%	72,402	41.39%	3,994	2.28%
Las Animas	3,073	47.02%	3,326	50.90%	136	2.08%
Lincoln	353	16.95%	1,675	80.45%	54	2.59%
Logan	1,791	22.31%	6,041	75.25%	196	2.44%
Mesa	27,657	38.44%	42,369	58.88%	1,929	2.68%
Mineral	286	42.50%	369	54.83%	18	2.67%
Moffat	1,000	18.73%	4,207	78.78%	133	2.49%
Montezuma	4,859	39.44%	7,175	58.24%	285	2.31%
Montrose	7,054	34.45%	13,021	63.59%	400	1.95%
Morgan	2,515	25.15%	7,265	72.65%	220	2.20%
Otero	2,751	38.69%	4,178	58.76%	181	2.55%
Ouray	2,087	59.61%	1,345	38.42%	69	1.97%
Park	4,107	41.61%	5,475	55.47%	288	2.92%
Phillips	324	17.09%	1,526	80.49%	46	2.43%
Pitkin	6,785	73.26%	2,277	24.58%	200	2.16%
Prowers	1,052	24.95%	3,077	72.97%	88	2.09%
Pueblo	33,282	50.34%	31,285	47.32%	1,544	2.34%
Rio Blanco	465	15.51%	2,463	82.13%	71	2.37%
Rio Grande	2,047	42.17%	2,693	55.48%	114	2.35%
Routt	8,252	61.60%	4,832	36.07%	313	2.34%
Saguache	1,530	55.88%	1,132	41.34%	76	2.78%
San Juan	343	65.46%	171	32.63%	10	1.91%
San Miguel	2,991	74.91%	892	22.34%	110	2.75%
Sedgwick	255	22.95%	826	74.35%	30	2.70%
Summit	9,295	67.04%	4,202	30.31%	367	2.65%
Teller	4,216	31.45%	8,866	66.14%	323	2.41%
Washington	296	12.70%	1,981	85.02%	53	2.27%
Weld	47,978	37.90%	75,572	59.70%	3,040	2.40%
Yuma	609	15.70%	3,194	82.32%	77	1.98%
Totals	1,349,133	54.74%	1,060,866	43.04%	54,577	2.21%

Counties that flipped from Republican to Democratic

- Garfield (largest city: Rifle)

==== By congressional district ====
Weiser won five of eight congressional districts.

District	Weiser	Kellner	Representative
1st	79%	19%	Diana DeGette
2nd	68%	29%	Joe Neguse
3rd	46%	51%	Lauren Boebert
4th	38%	60%	Ken Buck
5th	42%	55%	Doug Lamborn
6th	58%	39%	Jason Crow
7th	56%	42%	Ed Perlmutter (117th Congress)
7th	56%	42%	Brittany Pettersen (118th Congress)
8th	50%	48%	Yadira Caraveo

== Notes ==
Partisan clients
