= Joe Salazar =

American politician and attorney

Member of the Colorado House of Representatives from the 31st district
- In office January 2013 – January 4, 2019
- Preceded by: Judith Anne Solano
- Succeeded by: Yadira Caraveo

Personal details
- Born: Joseph Anthony Salazar; 1971 or 1972 (age 54–55)
- Party: Democratic
- Spouse: Jessica Salazar
- Education: University of Colorado, Boulder (BA); University of Denver (JD)

Joseph Anthony Salazar (born 1971/72) is an American attorney and politician. A Democrat, Salazar served as a member of the Colorado House of Representatives from 2013 to 2019. In 2018, Salazar ran for Colorado Attorney General, but lost the primary to eventual victor Phil Weiser by a margin of less than one percent of the vote.

Currently, he is the director of Colorado Rising, an anti-fracking Advocacy group. A supporter of Bernie Sanders, Salazar is considered a member of the progressive wing of the Democratic Party.

== Early life and education ==
Salazar was raised in Thornton, Colorado. Salazar states that the Spanish side of his family first came to the region in the 16th or early 17th century. Salazar stated that both of his grandmothers were of Apache origin, and that both of his grandparents were of Spanish descent. He received his bachelor's degree from the University of Colorado Boulder and his Juris Doctor degree from the University of Denver.

== Legal career ==
Salazar previously worked as an attorney with Smith, Shelton, Ragona and Salazar, LLC. He focused on employment law, civil rights, and constitutional law.

== Political career ==
=== Colorado House of Representatives ===
Salazar was elected to the Colorado House of Representatives in the 2012 election, and served in the chamber until 2019. During his time in the legislature, Salazar’s pushed to end the practice of high schools using mascots offensive to Native Americans. Salazar introduced legislation to repeal Columbus Day's status as a state holiday, stating that "Columbus’ legacy of abuse and disrespect is still readily apparent today."

During his tenure, Salazar supported freedom of information legislation that caps charges for filing Colorado Open Records Act (CORA) requests to four times the state's minimum wage. Salazar was noted for being among a small number of lawmakers in Colorado who supported Bernie Sanders's presidential campaign in the 2016 Democratic primary.

=== 2018 Colorado Attorney general candidacy ===
Following speculation of a potential gubernatorial candidacy, Salazar instead ran for Colorado Attorney General in the 2018 election. In the Democratic primary, Salazar faced Phil Weiser, the former dean of the University of Colorado Law School. Salazar's campaign received the support of Bernie Sanders and affiliated organization Our Revolution. He ultimately lost by a margin of 50.43% to 49.57%.

Democratic primary results
| Party | Candidate | Votes | % |
|---|---|---|---|
| Democratic | Phil Weiser | 298,048 | 50.43 |
| Democratic | Joe Salazar | 292,912 | 49.57 |
| Total votes | | 590,960 | 100.0 |

== Post-2018 career ==
After losing the 2018 election, Salazar became director of Colorado Rising, an anti-fracking advocacy group.

In January 2021, Salazar expressed interest in challenging incumbent Senator Michael Bennet in the Democratic primary in the 2022 U.S. Senate election. However, he announced in 2021 that he would not run for U.S. Senate, nor contest the newly created Colorado's 8th congressional district.

In November 2021, Salazar filed papers to run for Colorado's 24th Senate district. At the time of Salazar's announcement, the district was represented by Democrat Faith Winter. However, due to redistricting, Winter's residence would be in the 25th District, leaving the new district open. The newly created district includes Thornton and Federal Heights and parts of unincorporated Adams County to the northeast of these two municipalities. However, Salazar chose to drop out of the contest in February 2022.
