= Lesley Dahlkemper =

American politician (born 1966/1967)

- Dahlkemper in 2021

Lieutenant Governor-elect of Colorado
- Assuming office January 11, 2027
- Governor: Phil Weiser (elect)
- Succeeding: Dianne Primavera

Personal details
- Born: 1966 or 1967 (age 59–60) Chicago, Illinois, U.S.
- Party: Democratic
- Spouse: Mike Feeley
- Education: Northern Illinois University (BA); University of Illinois, Springfield (MA)

Lesley Dahlkemper (born 1966/1967) is an American politician serving on the county commission of Jefferson County, Colorado from the 3rd district. She is the lieutenant governor-elect of Colorado.

== Early life and education ==
Dahlkemper earned a bachelor's degree in history from Northern Illinois University and a master's degree in journalism from Sangamon State University (now the University of Illinois Springfield) in 1989.

== Personal life ==
Dahlkemper is married to attorney Mike Feeley. Feeley was the Democratic nominee for Colorado's 7th congressional district in 2002, runner-up in the Democratic primary election for governor in 1998, and a former minority leader and member of the Colorado Senate.

Political offices
Preceded by Dianne Primavera	Lieutenant Governor of Colorado; Taking office 2027	Elect
