= Indigenous Peoples in International Law =

1996 book by James Anaya

- Author: James Anaya
- Language: English
- Subject: Indigenous rights, International law
- Publisher: Oxford University Press
- Publication date: 1996
- Media type: Paperback
- Pages: 408
- ISBN: 0-19-517350-3

Indigenous Peoples in International Law (ISBN 0-19517-350-3) is a book written by James Anaya. According to the author, "the central contention of this book is that international law, although once an instrument of colonialism, has developed and continues to develop, however grudgingly or imperfectly, to support indigenous peoples’ demands".

== Overview ==
James Anaya's book is noted as a systematic overview of the status of indigenous peoples in international law. The books explores the relations and differences between the indigenous peoples and other peoples or nations. The book constitutes one of the most sustained accounts of the development of the international law in recognizing the indigenous peoples as a distinct category. Throughout the book, Anaya discusses not only the official legal texts that relate to indigenous peoples but also the preparatory documents and background debates.

Canadian philosopher Will Kymlicka, considers the book to "undoubtedly serve as the standard reference" for the development of the Declaration on the Rights of Indigenous Peoples. However, Anaya is not only interested in cataloguing the developments of international law in the matters concerning indigenous peoples. He wishes to provide a theory of indigenous rights. He wants to show that the new international norms providing indigenous rights are a coherent and defensible set of moral principles, and not just an ad hoc compromise between contending groups. James Anaya shows that international law includes norms and procedures that benefit indigenous peoples, and that this challenges the legacy of dispossession and the forces that would see it continue.

== Reviews ==
Some of the reviews on this book include:

"No human rights collection would be complete without this well-documented survey of an often-neglected area of international law."--American Society of International Law

"Anaya's distillation of the complex debate surrounding the content of the right to self-determination has a clarity that is often missing in discussions of the term....Anaya's presentation of the history, continuing struggles, and achievements of the indigenous rights movement is exemplary scholarship."—European Journal of International Law

"Deserves a readership well beyond those interested only in indigenous peoples. It is a fascinating study of the dramatic changes occurring in the doctrine of international law in our times."--American Journal of International Law

"...The scope, detail, and documentary rigor of [the book] make it an essential reference for future work in the field."-American Political Science Review

"James Anaya has done for indigenous people in international law what Felix Cohen did for Native Americans in the United States. He has brought clarity, understanding, and order to a field previously understood only in isolated bits and pieces. It will now be impossible to think about this topic without consideration of Professor Anaya's prodigious research and deeply analytical jurisprudential and pragmatic insights."—Rennard Strickland, Dean, Oklahoma City University School of Law

"[P]rovides a thorough, insightful, and constructive analysis of the treatment of indigenous peoples in both historical and contemporary international law regimes. The book leaves the reader with a clearer understanding of the failures of international law in the past, as well as a sense of the potential of international law today."--Virginia Journal of International Law
