= Michael J. Allen =

American lawyer and politician from Colorado

Michael Allen
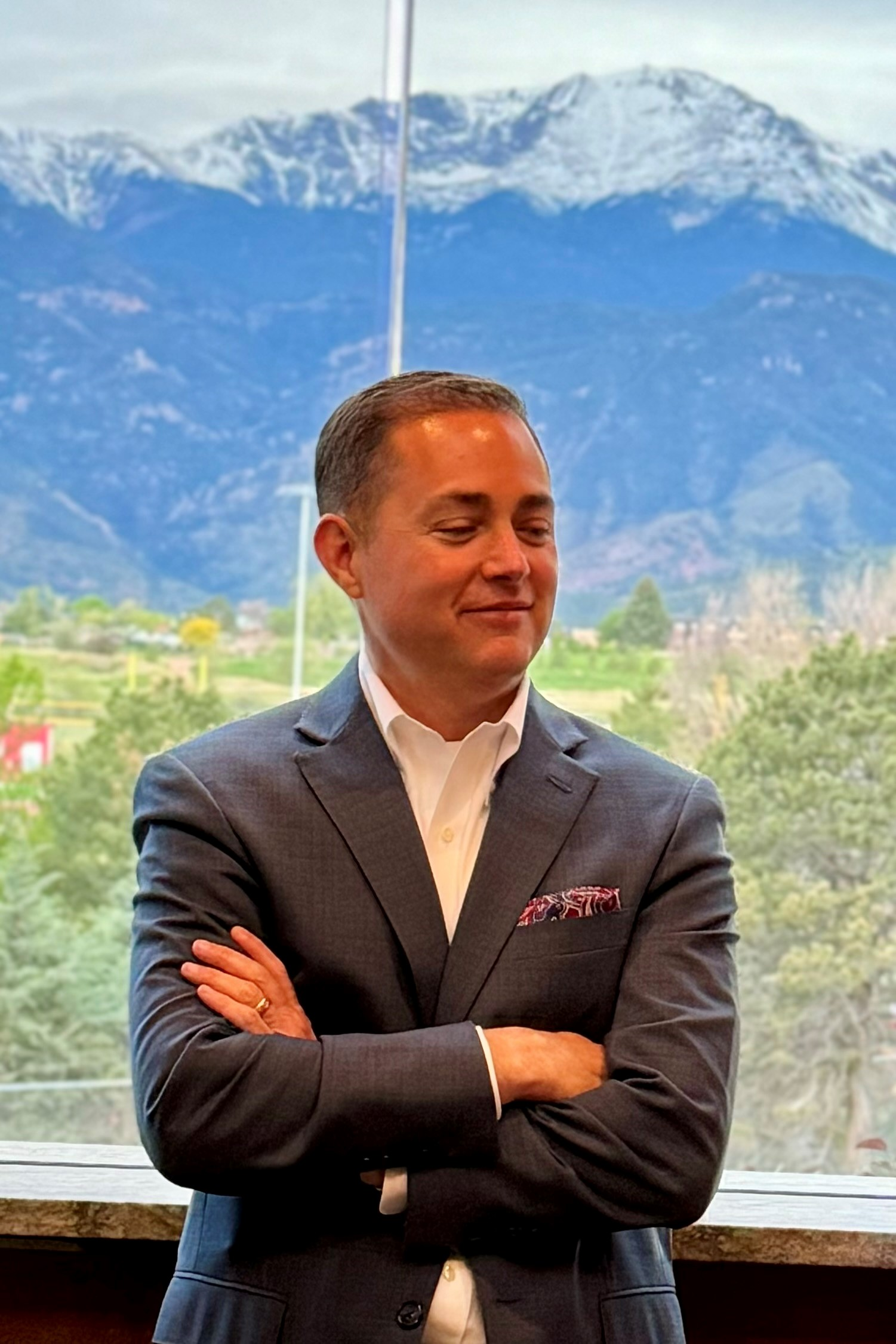
- Allen in 2021

District Attorney for Colorado’s Fourth Judicial District
- Incumbent
- Assumed office January 12, 2021
- Preceded by: Diana May

Personal details
- Born: March 13, 1972 (age 54) Colorado
- Party: Republican
- Education: University of Northern Colorado (BA); University of Kansas (JD)

Military service
- Branch/service: United States Navy
- Years of service: 1994–1998

Michael J. Allen (born March 13, 1972) is an American lawyer who serves as the current District Attorney for 4th Judicial District.

On January 6, 2026, Allen announced his candidacy for the Republican nomination for Attorney General of Colorado.

== Early life and education ==
Allen graduated from Arvada West High School in 1991. He enlisted in the U.S. Navy and served as an Aviation Electronics Technician until he was honorably discharged in 1998.

Following his military career, Allen earned a B.A. from the University of Northern Colorado in 2001. He earned his J.D. from the University of Kansas School of Law in 2005.

== Legal career ==
Allen served as a prosecutor at Johnson County Kansas District Attorney's Office, Douglas County Attorney's Office, and Kansas Attorney General's Office before returning to Colorado. In 2011, he joined the 4th Judicial District Attorney's Office in Colorado Springs, Colorado. In 2021, he was elected as the district attorney for the 4th Judicial District.

== Awards ==
In 2015 and 2017, Allen was named Homicide Prosecutor of the Year in the 4th Judicial District. In 2024, he received the Patriot Award from the U.S. Secretary of Defense for his support of the guard and reserve at the 4th Judicial District Attorney's Office.

== Personal life ==
Allen resides with his wife in El Paso County, Colorado.
