= James Anaya =

American lawyer and professor

S. James Anaya
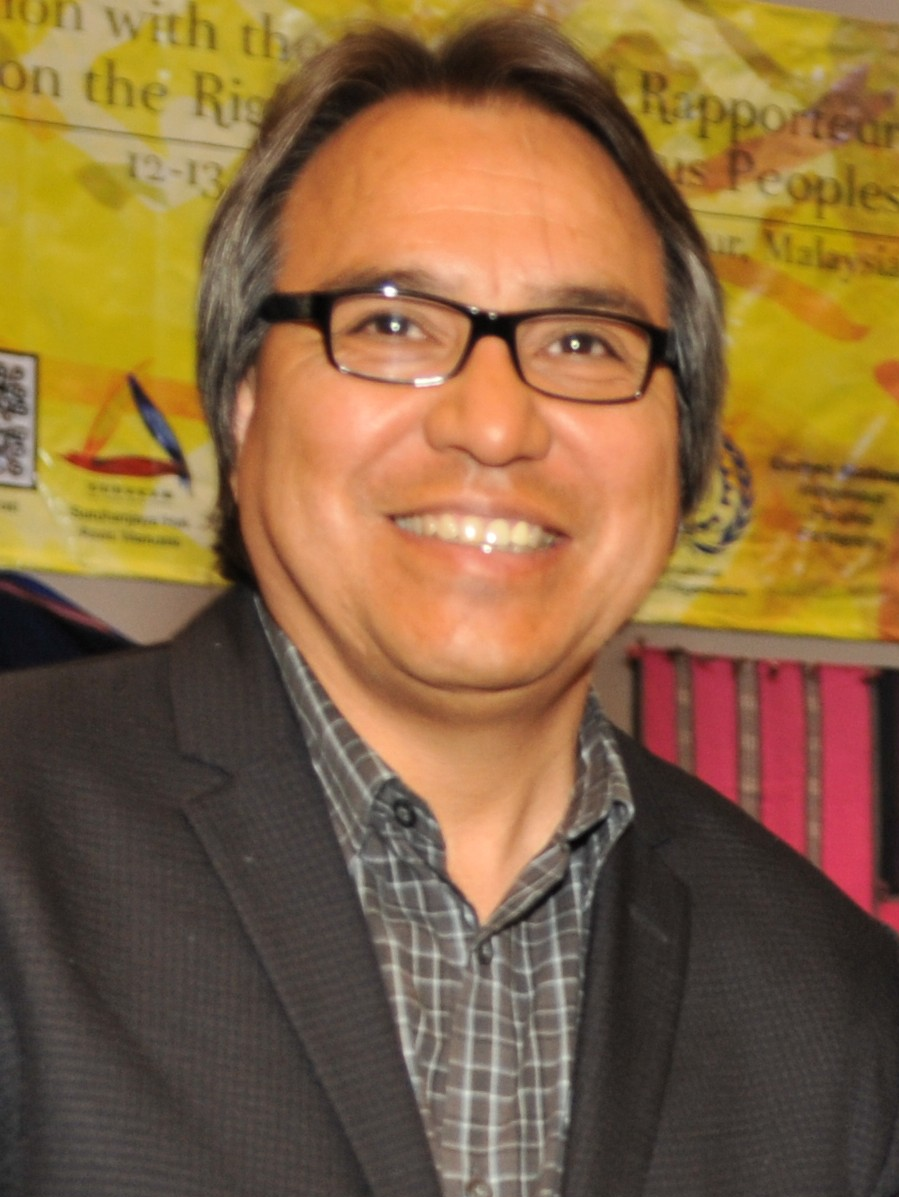
- Anaya in Kuala Lumpur, March 2013

16th Dean of the University of Colorado Law School
- In office August 8, 2016 – June 30, 2021
- Preceded by: Phil Weiser
- Succeeded by: Lolita Buckner

Personal details
- Education: University of New Mexico (BA); Harvard Law School (JD)
- Website: James Anaya official website

Stephen James Anaya is an American lawyer who served as the 16th Dean of the University of Colorado Boulder Law School. He was formerly the James J. Lenoir Professor of Human Rights Law and Policy at the University of Arizona's James E. Rogers College of Law and previously served for more than ten years on the faculty at the University of Iowa College of Law. In March 2008, he was appointed by the United Nations as its Special Rapporteur on the situation of the human rights and fundamental freedoms of indigenous people, replacing Rodolfo Stavenhagen. He was elected a Member of the American Philosophical Society in 2019.

== Education and work ==
Anaya is a graduate of the University of New Mexico (B.A., 1980) and Harvard Law School (J.D., 1983). At Harvard Law School, he was a member of the Board of Student Advisers. He teaches and writes in the areas of international human rights, constitutional law, and issues concerning indigenous peoples.

Anaya has served as a consultant for organizations and government agencies in numerous countries on matters of human rights and indigenous peoples, and he has represented indigenous groups from many parts of North and Central America in landmark cases before courts and international organizations. He was the lead counsel for the indigenous parties in the case of Awas Tingni v. Nicaragua, in which the Inter-American Court of Human Rights for the first time upheld indigenous land rights as a matter of international law. In addition, he directed the legal team that successfully achieved a judgment by the Supreme Court of Belize affirming the traditional land rights of the Maya people of that country.

On April 13, 2016, University of Colorado Boulder Provost Russell L. Moore announced the appointment of James (Jim) Anaya, Regents' Professor and James J. Lenoir Professor of Human Rights Law and Policy at the University of Arizona, as dean of the University of Colorado Boulder Law School. Anaya began his duties on August 8, 2016. Anaya stepped down from his role as Dean of Colorado Law School effective June 30, 2021. He remains a distinguished faculty member.

Anaya is of Apache and Purépecha ancestry.

== Selected publications ==
- Anaya, S. James (1996). Indigenous Peoples in International Law. Oxford University Press.
- — (1998). "Maya aboriginal land and resource rights and the conflict over logging in southern Belize". Yale Human Rights & Development Law Journal. 1.
- — (2004). Indigenous peoples in international law (2nd ed.). Oxford University Press.
- International Human Rights: Problems of Law, Policy, and Practice (4th ed. 2006) (co-authored with Richard B. Lillich, Hurst Hannun & Dinah L. Shelton) ISBN 0-316-52687-8
- The Protection of Indigenous Peoples' Rights Over Lands and Natural Resources Under the Inter-American Human Rights System, 14 Harv. Hum. Rts. J. 33 (2001) (co-author with Robert A. Williams Jr.).
- The Native Hawaiian People and International Human Rights Law: Toward a Remedy for Past and Continuing Wrongs, 28 Ga. L. Rev. 309 (1994), reprinted in International Law and Indigenous Peoples 309 (S. James Anaya ed., 2003).
- A Contemporary Definition of the International Norm of Self-Determination, 3 Transnat'l L. & Contemp. Probs. 131 (1993).

A complete list of his academic publications to 2009 is available on the University of Arizona website.

Academic offices
Preceded by Phil Weiser	16th Dean of the University of Colorado School of Law; 2016–present	Incumbent
