= Joe Oltmann =

American podcaster and political activist

- Occupations: Business owner Podcaster
- Known for: Conservative political activism Conspiracy theories
- Notable work: The Conservative Daily podcast

Joe Oltmann is an American podcaster and political activist. Oltmann is the founder of several businesses in Colorado including a firearms retailer, a car repair shop, and a data firm. He is also the founder of FEC United, a conservative political organization. Oltmann hosts the podcast Conservative Daily, where he shares his views on social issues that some have described as discriminatory.

== Business career ==
Oltmann began his business career in the mid-2000s, when he was a co-founder of the auto repair and sales business Millennium Autosport in Colorado. Around this time he also helped the local police in disrupting an automobile theft ring that had stolen a vehicle from one of his clients. He is also co-owner of DCF Guns, a firearms retailer. Oltmann's public political activism began during the COVID-19 pandemic, when he served as the CEO of PIN Business Network, a data management company. During this time he began to fund protests of the State of Colorado's early stay-at-home orders.

== Conservative activism ==
Oltmann's activism next included questioning the Black Lives Matter movement, including issuing claims that Antifa was responsible for arsons in his home state. He also became the host of the podcast Conservative Daily, where he shares far-right theories and opinions, such as his support of the Russian invasion of Ukraine. Some of his comments have led to defamation suits, such as his claim that an LGBTQ magazine journalist was an accessory to the murder of a woman who later proved to still be alive. Media Matters has reported that Oltmann's podcast has collaborated in advancing QAnon claims and conspiracy theories. He has also issued racist attacks against the philosophy of critical race theory and pushed conspiracy theories steeped in antisemitism.

In 2022 his podcast was featured in television news due to his advocacy of executing political foes by hanging, after a Republican state lawmaker nominated Oltmann for governor. He has also called for the execution of US President Joe Biden.

In January 2026, Oltmann filed for candidacy in the 2026 Colorado gubernatorial election, seeking the Republican Party nomination.

=== Election denial ===
Oltmann is the founder of FEC United, a political organization that advocates for candidates for public office in the State of Colorado and has been involved in the Stop the Steal campaign in its efforts to spread disinformation about the 2020 US presidential election results. This included actions immediately after Donald Trump's election loss, when he met with members of Trump's staff in conversations arranged by Trump lawyer John Eastman. He has also been accused of defamation in a lawsuit filed against him and other defendants by a former executive of Dominion Voting Systems.

Oltmann has continued to participate in events that spread disinformation about the 2020 election, including an event in Colorado where he falsely claimed that he and his compatriots suffered an anthrax attack, instead of falling ill due to COVID-19. His company, PIN, has been involved in spreading misinformation online via paid email circulations. His election denialism also extended beyond the 2020 election, when in 2022 he hosted a rally to protest the results of the 2022 United States elections, claiming they had been skewed by fraudulent activity.

== Personal life ==
Joe Oltmann lives on an estate in the community of Castle Rock, Colorado.
