= Colorado's 7th congressional district =

U.S. House district for Colorado

Coordinates: 39°49′34″N 105°02′32″W

- Interactive map of district boundaries since January 3, 2023
- Representative: Brittany Pettersen; D–Lakewood
- Distribution: 99.44% urban; 0.56% rural
- Population (2025): 724,023
- Median household income: $104,328
- Ethnicity: 74.9% White; 15.1% Hispanic; 4.4% Two or more races; 3.1% Asian; 1.3% Black; 1.1% other
- Cook PVI: D+8

Colorado's 7th congressional district is a congressional district in the U.S. state of Colorado. Formerly located only in the northeast part of the state, the district now encompasses the western parts of the Denver metropolitan area, including Golden, Lakewood, Arvada and Broomfield, along with the central Colorado counties of El Paso County, Jefferson, Park, Teller, Lake, Chaffee, Fremont, and Custer.

The district has been represented by Democrat Brittany Pettersen since 2023.

== History ==
=== 2000s ===
The 7th congressional district was created following the 2000 U.S. census and associated realignment and reapportionment of Colorado congressional districts. It formerly consisted of portions of Adams, Arapahoe, and Jefferson counties, see above for the more recent list. The boundaries were drawn by a court after the state legislature failed to agree on a redistricting plan.

== Characteristics ==
As originally drawn, the 7th was a "fair fight" district that was split roughly 50-50 between Democrats and Republicans. The seat's original congressman, Republican Bob Beauprez, gave up the seat in 2006 to run for governor, and was succeeded by Democrat Ed Perlmutter. Since then, a growing Democratic trend in the Denver suburbs allowed Perlmutter to strengthen his hold on the seat.

Redistricting after the 2010 census shifted the district to the more populated portions of Jefferson County, making it slightly more Democratic. The 2020 census has changed the district significantly, absorbing the rural areas in the central portion of the state. While the district takes in much more rural population than before, the bulk of population still lives in Jefferson and Broomfield counties, giving the district a mildly Democratic tilt.

== Recent election results from statewide races ==
Year	Office	Results
2008	President	Obama 52% - 46%
2008	Senate	Udall 51% - 43%
2010	Senate	Buck 47.05% - 47.03%
2010	Governor	Hickenlooper 50% - 9%
2010	Secretary of State	Gessler 51% - 42%
2010	Treasurer	Stapleton 51% - 49%
2010	Attorney General	Suthers 58% - 42%
2012	President	Obama 51% - 49%
2014	Senate	Udall 49% - 45%
2016	President	Clinton 47% - 44%
2016	Senate	Bennet 49% - 45%
2018	Governor	Polis 53% - 43%
2018	Attorney General	Weiser 51% - 46%
2020	President	Biden 56% - 42%
2020	Senate	Hickenlooper 54% - 44%
2022	Senate	Bennet 57% - 40%
2022	Governor	Polis 60% - 38%
2022	Secretary of State	Griswold 56% - 42%
2022	Treasurer	Young 55% - 42%
2022	Attorney General	Weiser 56% - 42%
2024	President	Harris 56% - 41%

== Composition ==
For the 118th and successive Congresses (based on redistricting following the 2020 census), the district contains all or portions of the following counties and communities:

Adams County (1)

Arvada (part; also 2nd and 8th; shared with Jefferson County)

Broomfield County (1)

Broomfield

Chaffee County (8)

All 8 communities

Custer County (2)

Silver Cliff, Westcliffe

El Paso County (1)

Green Mountain Falls (shared with Teller County)

Fremont County (12)

All 12 communities

Jefferson County (20)

Applewood, Arvada (part; also 2nd and 8th; shared with Adams County), Aspen Park, Brook Forest (part; also 2nd; shared with Clear Creek County), Dakota Ridge, East Pleasant View, Edgewater, Evergreen, Fairmount, Genesee, Golden, Idledale, Indian Hills, Kittredge, Lakeside, Lakewood, Morrison, Westminster (part; also 8th; shared with Adams County), West Pleasant View, Wheat Ridge

Lake County (3)

All 3 communities

Park County (4)

All 4 communities

Teller County (8)

All 8 communities

== List of members representing the district ==
Name	Party	Years	Cong– ress	Electoral history	District location
District created January 3, 2003
Bob Beauprez (Arvada)	Republican	January 3, 2003 – January 3, 2007	108th 109th	Elected in 2002. Re-elected in 2004. Retired to run for Governor of Colorado.	2003–2013
Ed Perlmutter (Arvada)	Democratic	January 3, 2007 – January 3, 2023	110th 111th 112th 113th 114th 115th 116th 117th	Elected in 2006. Re-elected in 2008. Re-elected in 2010. Re-elected in 2012. Re-elected in 2014. Re-elected in 2016. Re-elected in 2018. Re-elected in 2020. Retired.	2003–2013
Ed Perlmutter (Arvada)	Democratic	January 3, 2007 – January 3, 2023	110th 111th 112th 113th 114th 115th 116th 117th	Elected in 2006. Re-elected in 2008. Re-elected in 2010. Re-elected in 2012. Re-elected in 2014. Re-elected in 2016. Re-elected in 2018. Re-elected in 2020. Retired.	2013–2023
Brittany Pettersen (Lakewood)	Democratic	January 3, 2023 – present	118th 119th	Elected in 2022. Re-elected in 2024. Re-elected in 2026.	2023–present

== Election results ==
=== 2002 ===
2002 United States House of Representatives elections in Colorado
Party	Candidate	Votes	%
Republican	Bob Beauprez	81,789	47%
Democratic	Mike Feeley	81,668	47%
Green	Dave Chandler	3,274	2%
Reform	Victor Good	3,133	2%
Libertarian	G. T. "Bud" Martin	2,906	2%
Independent	Stanford Andress (as a write-in)	109	0%
Total votes		172,879	100%
Republican win (new seat)			

=== 2004 ===
2004 United States House of Representatives elections in Colorado
Party	Candidate	Votes	%
Republican	Bob Beauprez (incumbent)	135,571	55%
Democratic	Dave Thomas	106,026	43%
Constitution	Clyde J. Harkins	6,167	2%
Total votes		247,764	100%
Republican hold			

=== 2006 ===
2006 United States House of Representatives elections in Colorado
Party	Candidate	Votes	%
Democratic	Ed Perlmutter	103,918	55%
Republican	Rick O'Donnell	79,571	42%
Green	Dave Chandler	3,073	2%
Constitution	Roger McCarville	2,605	1%
Total votes		189,172	100%
Democratic gain from Republican			

=== 2008 ===
2008 United States House of Representatives elections in Colorado
Party	Candidate	Votes	%
Democratic	Ed Perlmutter (incumbent)	173,931	63
Republican	John W. Lerew	100,055	37
Total votes		273,986	100%
Democratic hold			

=== 2010 ===
2010 United States House of Representatives elections in Colorado
Party	Candidate	Votes	%
Democratic	Ed Perlmutter (incumbent)	112,667	53
Republican	Ryan Frazier	88,026	42
Libertarian	Buck Bailey	10,117	5
Total votes		210,810	100
Democratic hold			

=== 2012 ===
2012 United States House of Representatives elections in Colorado
Party	Candidate	Votes	%
Democratic	Ed Perlmutter (incumbent)	182,460	54
Republican	Joe Coors, Jr.	139,066	41
Libertarian	Buck Bailey	9,148	3
Constitution	Douglas Campbell	10,296	2
Total votes		340,970	100
Democratic hold			

=== 2014 ===
2014 United States House of Representatives elections in Colorado
Party	Candidate	Votes	%
Democratic	Ed Perlmutter (incumbent)	148,225	55
Republican	Don Ytterberg	120,918	45
Total votes		269,143	100
Democratic hold			

=== 2016 ===
2016 United States House of Representatives elections in Colorado
Party	Candidate	Votes	%
Democratic	Ed Perlmutter (incumbent)	199,758	55.18
Republican	George Athanasopoulos	144,066	39.80
Libertarian	Martin L. Buchanan	18,186	5.02
Total votes		362,010	100%
Democratic hold			

=== 2018 ===
2018 United States House of Representatives elections in Colorado
Party	Candidate	Votes	%
Democratic	Ed Perlmutter (incumbent)	204,260	60.42%
Republican	Mark Barrington	119,734	35.42%
Libertarian	Jennifer Nackerud	14,012	4.14%
Total votes		338,067	100%
Democratic hold			

=== 2020 ===
2020 United States House of Representatives elections in Colorado
Party	Candidate	Votes	%
Democratic	Ed Perlmutter (incumbent)	250,525	59.1%
Republican	Casper Stockham	159,301	37.6%
Libertarian	Ken Biles	11,510	2.7%
Unity	Dave Olszta	2,355	0.6%
Total votes		423,691	100%
Democratic hold			

=== 2022 ===
2022 United States House of Representatives elections in Colorado
Party	Candidate	Votes	%
Democratic	Brittany Pettersen	204,984	56.4%
Republican	Erik Aadland	150,510	41.4%
Libertarian	Ross Klopf	6,187	1.7%
Unity	Critter Milton	1,828	0.5%
Independent	JP Lujan (write-in)	92	0.0%
Total votes		363,601	100%
Democratic hold			

=== 2024 ===
2024 United States House of Representatives elections in Colorado
Party	Candidate	Votes	%
Democratic	Brittany Pettersen (incumbent)	235,688	55.33%
Republican	Sergei Matveyuk	175,273	41.15%
Libertarian	Patrick Bohan	9,697	2.28%
Unity	Ron Tupa	5,271	1.24%
Write-in		37	0.00%
Total votes		425,966	100%
Democratic hold			

== Historical district boundaries ==
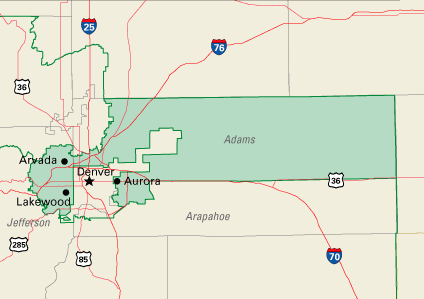
2003–2013

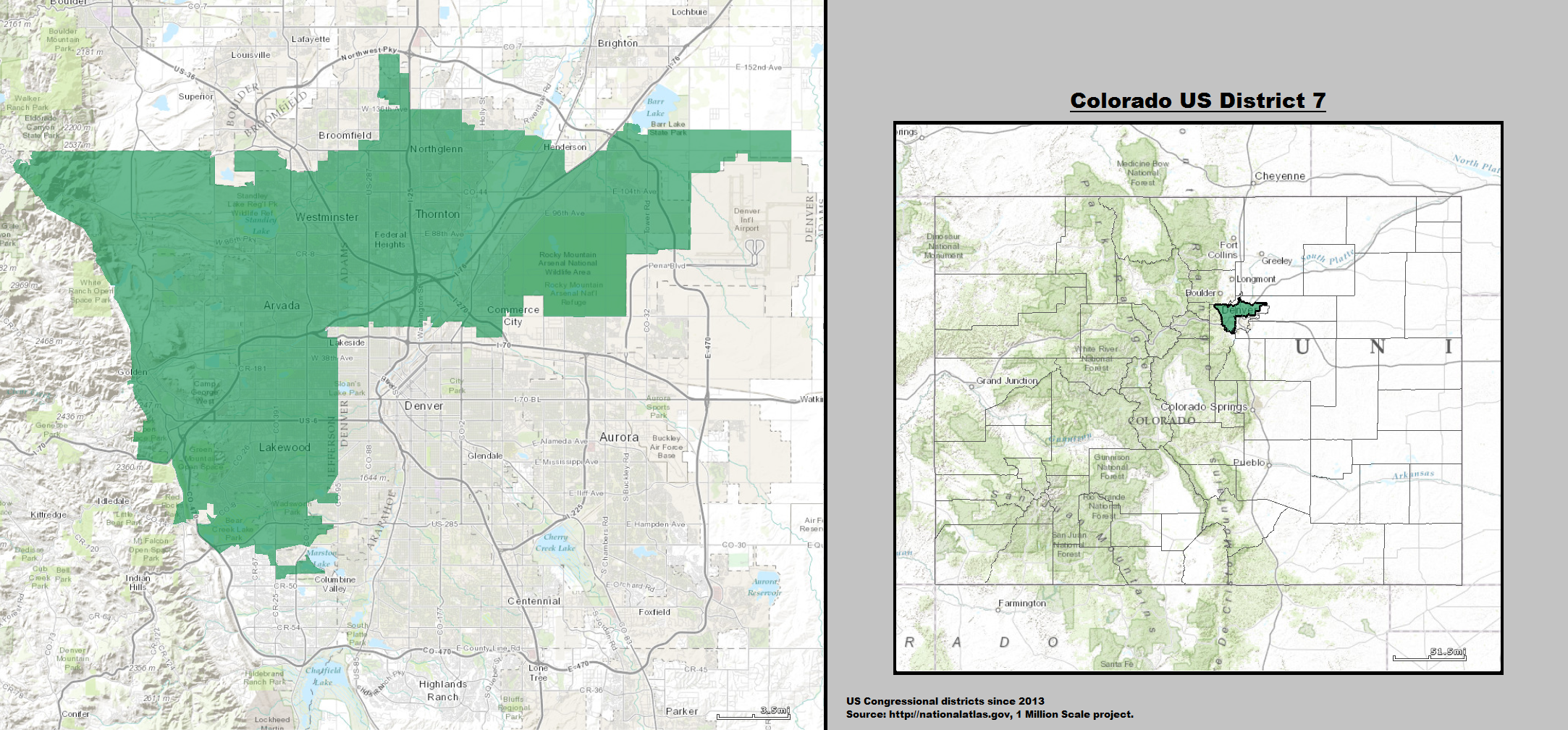
2013–2023

== See also ==
- Colorado's congressional districts
- List of United States congressional districts
