= Jena Griswold =

American attorney and politician (born 1984)

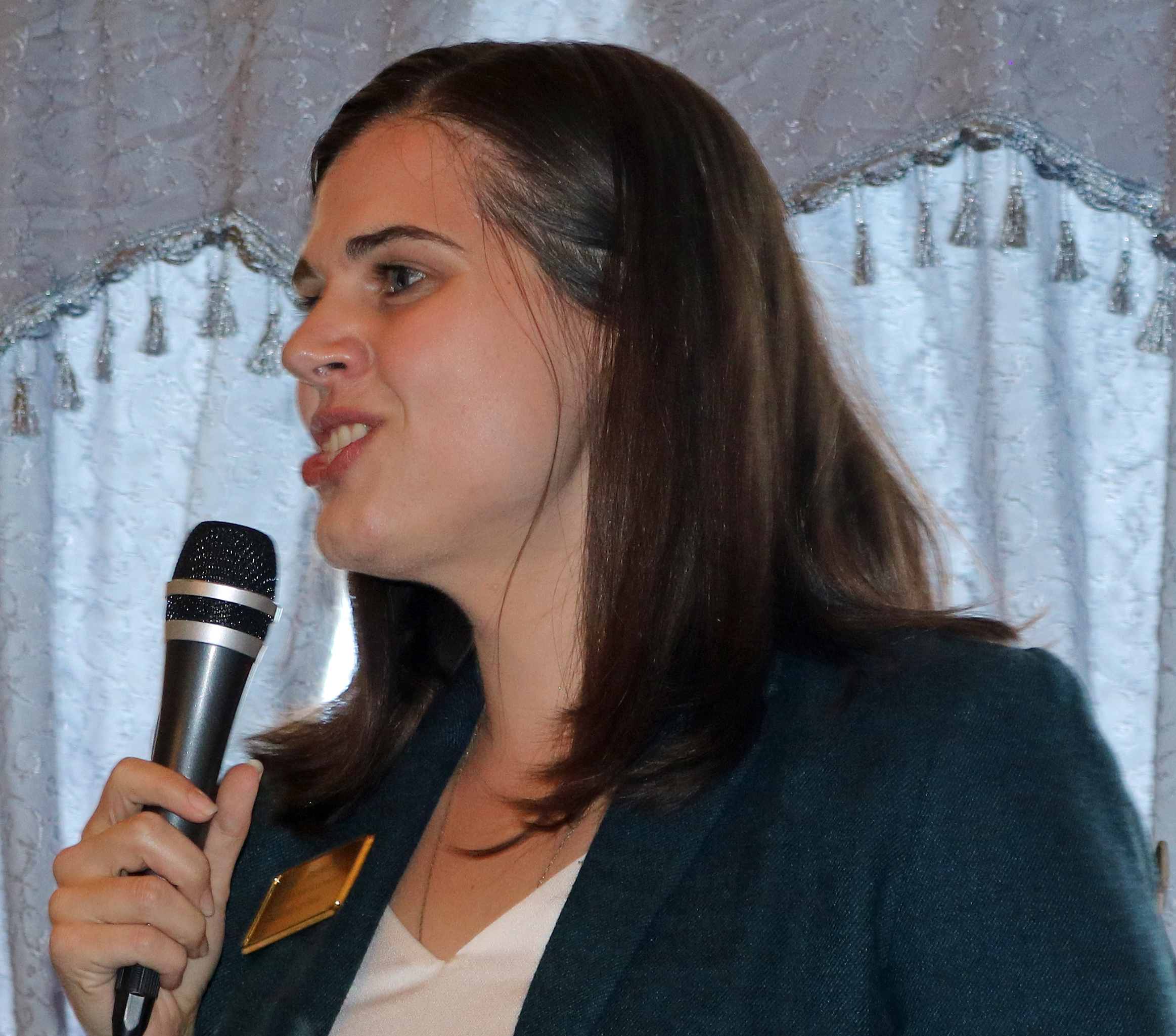
- Griswold in 2018

Attorney General-elect of Colorado
- Assuming office January 11, 2027
- Governor: Phil Weiser (elect)
- Succeeding: Phil Weiser

39th Secretary of State of Colorado
- Incumbent
- Assumed office January 8, 2019
- Governor: Jared Polis
- Preceded by: Wayne Williams

Personal details
- Born: October 2, 1984 (age 42) Toledo, Ohio, U.S.
- Party: Democratic
- Education: Whitman College (BA); University of Pennsylvania (JD)

Jena Marie Griswold (born October 2, 1984) is an American attorney and politician from the state of Colorado. A Democrat, she is the 39th Colorado Secretary of State, serving since January 8, 2019. She was the first Democrat to be elected Secretary of State of Colorado since 1958.

Griswold was the Democratic nominee for attorney general of Colorado in the 2026 election. She won, making her the first Democratic woman elected as attorney general in Colorado.

== Early life and career ==
Griswold was born in a Jewish family in Toledo, Ohio, and moved to Estes Park, Colorado, at the age of 10. She graduated from Estes Park High School in 2002. She graduated from Whitman College, magna cum laude, with a Bachelor of Arts in politics and Spanish literature in 2006. She graduated from the University of Pennsylvania Law School with a Juris Doctor in 2011. In 2006, Griswold was awarded the Watson Foundation Fellowship, and in 2009, the Penn Law International Human Rights Fellowship.

Griswold moved to Washington, D.C. in 2011, and worked for President Barack Obama's 2012 campaign as a voter protection attorney. In June 2013, Governor John Hickenlooper appointed Griswold as Director of Special Projects in the Office of the Governor, serving as his lobbyist in Washington, D.C. She served in that role until August 2015, after which she worked at the Colorado Department of Health Care Policy and Financing as a Temporary Aide until leaving government employment in May 2016.

== Secretary of State of Colorado ==
In the 2018 general election, Griswold ran for Secretary of State of Colorado. She defeated the incumbent Republican Wayne Williams in the November 6 general election to become the first elected Democratic Secretary of State in Colorado since 1963 and the first woman from the Democratic Party to ever hold the office.

Griswold has prioritized campaign finance reform and increasing voter registration. She filed suit to prevent Tina Peters from being able to oversee elections in Mesa County in 2021 and 2022 due to her attempt to interfere in the 2020 U.S. presidential election.

Griswold won a second term in the 2022 election, defeating Republican Pam Anderson, a former county clerk and recorder from Jefferson County, with 55 percent of the vote.

In October 2022, the secretary of state's office mistakenly sent postcards encouraging voter registration to approximately 30,000 noncitizens, attributing the error to a database glitch related to the state's list of residents issued driver's licenses. The office said the postcards, mailed on September 27, were sent after a list provided by the Electronic Registration Information Center was compared against a Department of Revenue driver's license database that lacked formatting information needed to exclude noncitizens, and that it was aware of no cases of a recipient of the erroneous mailing attempting to register. State Republican Party chair Kristi Burton Brown criticized Griswold over the error, which the office said was under investigation.

On September 6, 2023, six voters filed a lawsuit in Colorado state district court seeking to prevent Trump from appearing on the state's Republican presidential primary due to his role in the January 6 United States Capitol attack, naming Griswold as the respondent in her official capacity as Colorado Secretary of State. Judge Sarah B. Wallace ruled that Griswold must keep Trump on the ballot but stated that Trump engaged in insurrection by standard of preponderance of the evidence, the first time a judge has explicitly stated Trump incited the January 6 Capitol attack, The plaintiffs appealed the ruling and the Colorado Supreme Court ruled in a 4–3 per curiam decision that Trump is disqualified from the primary ballot, reversing the district court's ruling. The Supreme Court of the United States later ruled that individual states cannot prevent a candidate from appearing on a presidential ballot.

On April 4, 2024, a resolution proposed by Republicans to impeach Griswold was introduced to the Colorado House of Representatives. The impeachment articles cited Griswold's comments about Donald Trump leading up to the Supreme Court hearing of Trump v. Anderson, and the incorrect claim that Trump was not on the ballot for the Colorado presidential primary. On April 9, 2024, the impeachment articles failed in the House Judicial Committee.

In June 2024, a spreadsheet containing passwords to components of the state's voting systems was posted to the secretary of state's website, with the passwords located on a hidden worksheet that was not removed until late October. County clerks were not informed of the leak for several days after its discovery, drawing criticism from some election officials, including the head of the Colorado County Clerks Association, who said he learned of the publication through the media. An outside review by the firm Doherty Quinn, commissioned by Griswold's office, found that a "series of inadvertent and unforeseen events" led to the passwords' disclosure and broadly absolved Griswold and her staff of wrongdoing, while concluding that officials had violated state policy and issuing seven recommendations; Griswold said her office was committed to implementing the recommendations. A proposal for a legislative audit of the leak failed on a party-line tie vote in the Legislative Audit Committee. The incident prompted calls for Griswold's resignation.

In August 2026, an error in an update to the secretary of state's online voter registration lookup tool made information for more than 130,000 voters who had requested confidential status publicly accessible for over a week. Griswold said, "I sincerely regret that this happened," and her office said it had reversed the update, contacted affected voters, and would implement additional automated and manual testing to prevent future disclosures. Michael Allen, Griswold's opponent in the 2026 Colorado Attorney General election, said he was among the affected voters and argued the incident raised questions about her candidacy for attorney general.

In late October 2026, after the Trump administration's decision to send monitors to polling locations in Adams County during the 2026 elections, Griswold detailed plans to send independent state monitors to accompany the federal poll watchers. The move comes as the Democratic-leaning county sits within the politically competitive 8th Congressional District but it was noted that Republican-leaning Weld County was left out of the federal monitoring. The plan to accompany the federal monitors was declined by the Trump administration and Griswold stated "My office provided reasonable restrictions on DOJ monitors, which they refused to accept. As a result, the DOJ will not be allowed to enter voter centers in Adams County" and that it was "illegal for anyone, including the DOJ, to intimidate or interfere with voters outside of voter centers. My office will take any suggestion of voter intimidation seriously and will act accordingly."

== Other political ventures ==
In 2019, it was reported that Griswold was considering a bid for United States Senate in the 2020 election against Republican incumbent Cory Gardner. She launched an exploratory committee for the position in July 2019. Griswold ultimately declined to run.

From 2019 to 2025, Jena Griswold chaired the Democratic Association of Secretaries of State. The group notably helped bolster Democratic Secretary of State candidates in battleground states in 2022 in a successful attempt to defeat Republicans that were election deniers. She was succeeded in 2025 by Cisco Aguilar.

== 2026 Colorado Attorney General campaign ==
Griswold is term-limited from running for re-election as secretary of state in 2026. On April 7, 2025, she announced that she would run for Colorado Attorney General in 2026, seeking to succeed Phil Weiser, who is also term-limited. Griswold's campaign has focused on issues over the growth of AI data centers, access to water usage, protecting constitutional rights and defending the state from federal overreach from the Trump administration.

During the 2026 attorney general campaign, critics alleged that the secretary of state's office had a toxic work environment and elevated staff turnover; Griswold's office disputed this, stating that turnover had been below average in each year of her tenure.

Griswold won, making her the first Democratic woman elected as attorney general in Colorado.

== Personal life ==
Griswold is Jewish. Griswold married Mohamed Enab in May 2014. In May 2024, she married her fiancé, Mario Cañedo. Griswold and Cañedo have one son, who was born in August 2024. Griswold lives in Louisville, Colorado.

== Electoral history ==
Colorado Secretary of State Election, 2018
Party	Candidate	Votes	%
Democratic	Jena Griswold	1,313,716	52.70
Republican	Wayne Williams	1,113,927	44.69
Constitution	Amanda Campbell	51,734	2.08
Approval Voting	Blake Huber	13,258	0.53

Colorado Secretary of State Election, 2022
Party	Candidate	Votes	%
Democratic	Jena Griswold	1,369,040	55.1
Republican	Pam Anderson	1,045,582	42.1
Libertarian	Bennett Rutledge	36,485	1.4
American Constitution	Amanda Campbell	17,602	0.71
Unity	Gary Swing	11,458	0.46
Approval Voting	Jan Kok	4,591	0.18

== Sources ==
- Anderson v. Griswold (No. 23SA300) (Colo. Dec. 19, 2023).

Political offices
Preceded by Wayne Williams	Secretary of State of Colorado; 2019–present	Incumbent
