= 2018 Colorado Attorney General election =

- November 6, 2018
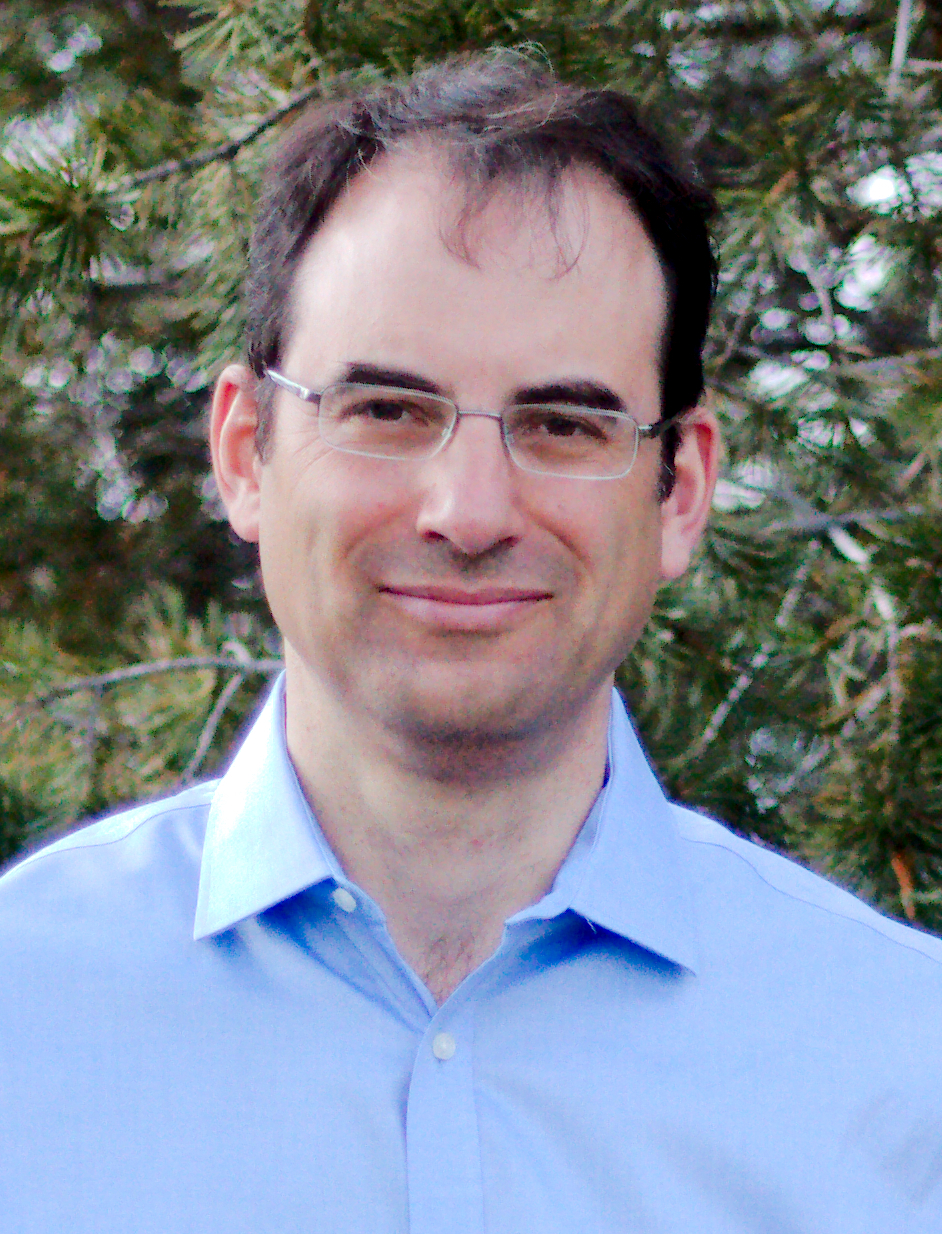

Nominee	Phil Weiser	George Brauchler
Party	Democratic	Republican
Popular vote	1,285,464	1,124,757
Percentage	51.58%	45.14%
- Weiser: 40–50% 50–60% 60–70% 70–80% 80–90% >90% Brauchler: 40–50% 50–60% 60–70% 70–80% 80–90% >90% Tie: 40–50% No votes
Attorney General before election
Cynthia Coffman
Republican
Elected Attorney General
Phil Weiser
Democratic

The 2018 Colorado Attorney General election took place on November 6, 2018, to elect the next attorney general of Colorado.

Incumbent Republican Cynthia Coffman did not run for re-election, instead opting to run for governor. The Democratic Party nominated Phil Weiser, who subsequently defeated Republican nominee George Brauchler in the general election.

Weiser's victory marked the first time a Democrat became attorney general since Ken Salazar in 2005 and the second time a Democrat was elected to the office since 1983.

== Republican primary ==
Arapahoe County District Attorney George Brauchler won the Republican nomination unopposed.

Republican primary results
Party	Candidate	Votes	%
Republican	George Brauchler	414,532	100.0
Total votes		414,532	100.0

== Democratic primary ==
The Democratic primary was contested between Phil Weiser, former dean of the University of Colorado Law School, and Joe Salazar, a state representative. Prior to the primary, outgoing Governor John Hickenlooper took the "extraordinary move" of publicly endorsing Weiser. Salazar's campaign had received support from democratic socialist U.S. Senator Bernie Sanders and left-wing organization Our Revolution.

=== Convention results ===
Weiser and Salazar qualified for the Democratic primary ballot. Attorney Amy Padden did not qualify.

Candidate	Total raw votes	Percentage of vote won (%)
Phil Weiser	1,805	52.87
Joe Salazar	1,249	36.59
Amy Padden	360	10.55

=== Primary results ===
Weiser narrowly defeated Salazar by a 50.43% to 49.57% margin.

Democratic primary results by county Weiser: 50–60%; Salazar: 50–60%; 60–70%; 70–80%; Tie: 50%

Democratic primary results
Party	Candidate	Votes	%
Democratic	Phil Weiser	298,048	50.43
Democratic	Joe Salazar	292,912	49.57
Total votes		590,960	100.0

== Libertarian nomination ==
Attorney William F. Robinson, III was the Libertarian nominee.

== General election ==
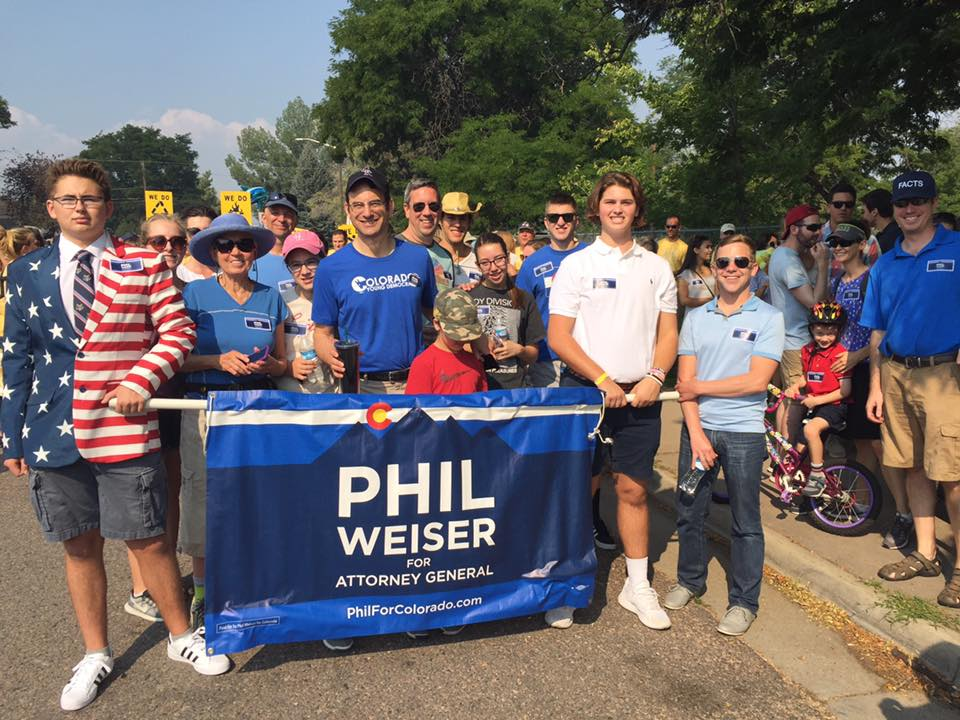
Supporters of Weiser at a rally

=== Predictions ===
Source	Ranking	As of
Governing	Tossup	October 26, 2018

=== Results ===
Weiser won the general election by a 6.5% margin of victory.

Colorado Attorney General election, 2018
Party	Candidate	Votes	%
Democratic	Phil Weiser	1,285,464	51.58%
Republican	George Brauchler	1,124,757	45.14%
Libertarian	William F. Robinson, III	81,733	3.28%
Total votes		2,491,954	100.00%
Democratic gain from Republican			

==== Results by congressional district ====
Weiser won four of seven congressional districts.

District	Brauchler	Weiser	Representative
1st	26%	72%	Diana DeGette
2nd	37%	60%	Joe Neguse
3rd	52%	45%	Scott Tipton
4th	60%	37%	Ken Buck
5th	59%	37%	Doug Lamborn
6th	45%	52%	Jason Crow
7th	41%	55%	Ed Perlmutter
