= Phil Weiser =

American lawyer and politician (born 1968)

- Weiser in 2018

Governor-elect of Colorado
- Assuming office January 11, 2027
- Lieutenant: Lesley Dahlkemper (elect)
- Succeeding: Jared Polis

39th Attorney General of Colorado
- Incumbent
- Assumed office January 8, 2019
- Governor: Jared Polis
- Preceded by: Cynthia Coffman

15th Dean of the University of Colorado Law School
- In office June 2011 – July 2016
- Preceded by: David Getches
- Succeeded by: James Anaya

Personal details
- Born: Philip Jacob Weiser; May 10, 1968 (age 58) New York, U.S.
- Party: Democratic
- Spouse: Heidi Wald (m. 2002)
- Children: 2
- Education: Swarthmore College (BA); New York University (JD)
- Website: Campaign website

Philip Jacob Weiser (born May 10, 1968) is an American attorney and politician who is the governor-elect of Colorado. He has served as the attorney general of Colorado since 2019. He is the Hatfield professor of law and telecommunications, executive director and founder of the Silicon Flatirons Center for Law, Technology, and Entrepreneurship, and dean emeritus at the University of Colorado Law School. He previously served in the Obama and Clinton administrations in the White House and Justice Department. A member of the Democratic Party, he was elected Attorney General for the State of Colorado in the 2018 election, defeating Republican George Brauchler on November 6, 2018. He was re-elected in 2022.

On January 2, 2025, Weiser announced his candidacy in the 2026 Colorado gubernatorial election. He won the Democratic nomination on June 30, 2026, defeating U.S. senator Michael Bennet in the primary.

On November 3, 2026, Weiser defeated Republican nominee Victor Marx.

== Early life and education ==
Weiser was born to an Ashkenazi Jewish family. His grandparents survived the Holocaust, and his mother, Estare, was born in the Buchenwald concentration camp in 1945.

Weiser attended Hastings High School in Westchester County, New York. After high school, he studied political science at Swarthmore College, graduating in 1990 with a Bachelor of Arts with high honors. He then attended the New York University School of Law, where he was an Articles Editor for the New York University Law Review. He graduated from NYU Law in 1994 with a Juris Doctor degree and Order of the Coif honors.

== Academic and federal government career ==
=== Law clerk and Clinton administration ===
After graduating, Weiser served as law clerk to Judge David Ebel of the Tenth Circuit Court of Appeals from September 1994 to August 1995. He was then a law clerk to Justices Byron R. White and Ruth Bader Ginsburg in the U.S. Supreme Court from September 1995 to August 1996. Following his clerkships, he was senior counsel to Joel Klein, the Assistant Attorney General for the Justice Department's Antitrust Division from 1996 to 1998.

=== Academic career ===
In 1999, Weiser joined the University of Colorado Law School in Boulder as a professor of law and telecommunications. There, Weiser established the national center of excellence in telecommunications and technology law and founded the Journal on Telecommunications & High Technology Law. He also founded the Silicon Flatirons Center for Law, Technology, and Entrepreneurship and he wrote and taught in the areas of competition policy, innovation policy, and Internet policy.

From June 2011 through July 2016, Weiser served as the fifteenth dean of the law school, and he was named one of the National Jurist's most influential leaders in legal education. Through the Silicon Flatirons Center, Weiser developed a range of programs to build up CU Boulder's support for entrepreneurship and has linked it to the local startup community. Some of the initiatives include Tech Lawyer Accelerator, the Corporate Counsel Intensive Institute and the Daniels Fund Ethics Initiative.

=== Obama administration ===
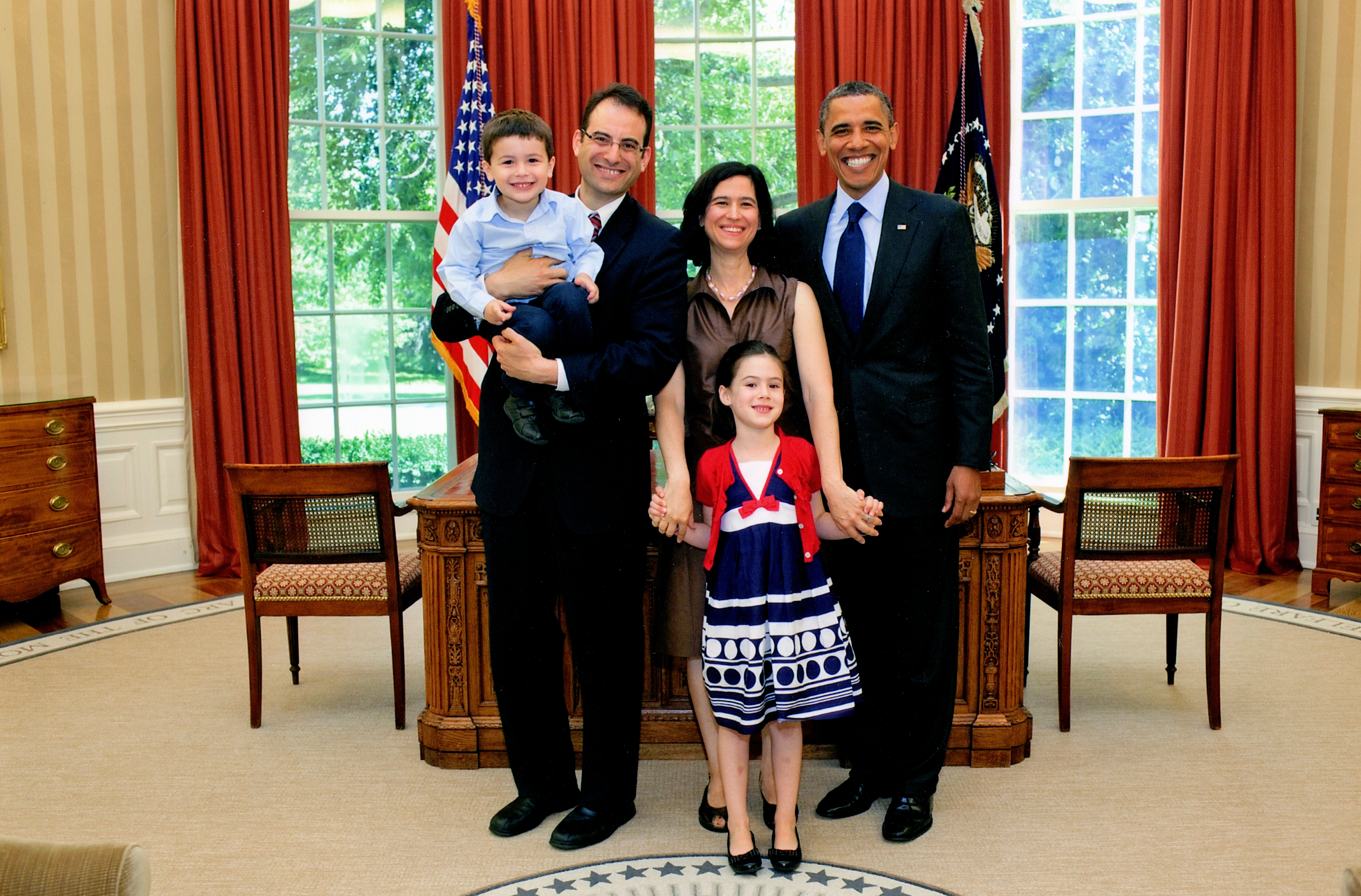
Weiser and his family with President Obama in the Oval Office

In 2009, President Barack Obama appointed Weiser as Deputy Assistant Attorney General in the Justice Department's Antitrust Division. He took the post in July 2009, taking a leave of absence from the University of Colorado Law School. In 2010, President Obama named him senior advisor for technology and innovation to the National Economic Council Director, and he participated in a series of policy initiatives.

== Attorney General of Colorado ==
=== Elections ===
Colorado Attorney General Election, 2018
Party	Candidate	Votes	%
Democrat	Phil Weiser	1,281,916	51.6
Republican	George Brauchler	1,120,834	45.1
Libertarian	William Robinson	81,222	3.3

Weiser was elected Attorney General for the State of Colorado in the 2018 election, defeating Republican George Brauchler on November 6, 2018. Weiser took office in January 2019, becoming the first Democratic Colorado Attorney General in 15 years. Later that same month, Weiser withdrew Colorado from a lawsuit that his predecessor, Republican Cynthia Coffman, had filed against the Clean Power Plan.

In the 2022 Colorado Attorney General election, Weiser was re-elected for a second term, defeating Republican challenger John Kellner and winning over 54% of votes cast.

=== Tenure ===
==== Lawsuits against the Trump administration ====
Since President Donald Trump took office in January 2025, Weiser has filed or joined more than 65 lawsuits challenging Trump administration policies. Weiser's lawsuits range in topics, but have been mostly focused on funding cuts, the environment, immigration, and federal firings. As of June 2026, the Colorado Sun's continuously updated tracker reported that courts had partially or fully blocked the challenged policies in 36 cases, left them in place in 8 cases, and were still considering 22. At a February 2026 news conference, Weiser said that his federal litigation had restored or protected more than $1 billion in Colorado funding. The following cases, selected for their impact on Colorado and presented in chronological order, illustrate the range of Weiser's federal litigation.

On April 1, 2025, Weiser's office led a coalition of 25 states and territories in suing the U.S. Department of Health and Human Services over its abrupt termination of $11 billion in federal public health funding the previous week. The administration had justified the termination by declaring the COVID-19 pandemic over and the grants therefore "no longer necessary," although Congress had reauthorized the funding as recently as June 2023, after the formal end of the pandemic emergency. The complaint states that the affected funds supported infectious-disease tracking, immunization access, emergency preparedness, mental health and substance abuse services, and public health data infrastructure across the plaintiff states. In Colorado specifically, the terminations threatened the state's Behavioral Health Administration and 68 of its grantee partners, including the Mobile Crisis Response program and the Assertive Community Treatment program, which served more than 650 individuals with serious mental illness. The court granted a temporary restraining order within two days of filing, entered a preliminary injunction six weeks later requiring HHS to restore the funding, and saw the administration's appeal voluntarily dismissed shortly thereafter.

On October 28, 2025, Weiser joined attorneys general from 25 states in a lawsuit to prevent the Trump administration from suspending payments under the Supplemental Nutrition Assistance Program (SNAP). SNAP provides approximately $120 million in benefits to 600,000 Coloradans each month. USDA had taken the position that it lacked authority to use approximately $5 billion in SNAP contingency funds to cover November 2025 benefits during the ongoing federal government shutdown. On May 1, 2026, USDA reversed course and agreed not to withhold SNAP benefits. The parties then jointly asked the court to dismiss the case, which it did.

On January 9, 2026, Weiser joined attorneys general from California, Illinois, Minnesota, and New York in suing the Trump administration over a freeze of more than $10 billion in federal funding for child care, cash assistance, and social services programs across the five states. The administration had announced the freeze days earlier, citing concerns about fraud and benefits going to undocumented immigrants, although undocumented immigrants do not qualify for the Temporary Assistance for Needy Families (TANF) program or Colorado's child care assistance program under existing rules. The same day the suit was filed, the court granted a temporary restraining order requiring the administration to release the funds. A preliminary injunction followed in February 2026, blocking the administration from re-imposing the restrictions. The three programs at issue provide Colorado with approximately $300 million annually and support more than 27,000 children in the state's child care assistance program, more than 50,000 children through TANF-funded cash assistance, and another 14,400 children through prevention and intervention services.

On February 18, 2026, Weiser's office co-led a coalition of 13 state attorneys general, with California Attorney General Rob Bonta and Washington Attorney General Nick Brown, in filing suit opposing the Trump administration's termination of approximately $8 billion in clean-energy and infrastructure awards nationwide, including more than $600 million for Colorado projects affecting Colorado State University, the Colorado School of Mines, and the University of Colorado. The complaint alleged that the executive branch could not unilaterally cancel funding Congress had appropriated under the 2021 Bipartisan Infrastructure Law and the 2022 Inflation Reduction Act. The case remained pending as of mid-2026.

==== Opioid settlement ====
In July 2019, Weiser amended Colorado's existing lawsuit against Purdue Pharma to name eight members of the Sackler family, which privately owned Purdue, along with several former company executives. The amended complaint alleges "fraudulent and reckless conduct" under three Colorado statutes: the Consumer Protection Act, the Organized Crime Control Act, and the Uniform Fraudulent Transfer Act. The complaint also alleges that warnings about addiction risk were brushed aside in pursuit of sales.

In total, the lawsuits Weiser filed and those he joined have brought more than $912 million to Colorado, including at least $32 million from an April 2026 settlement with the Albertsons grocery chain.

==== Tenant protections ====
Weiser has made housing a major focus of his tenure, pursuing legal action against large rental property owners and managers accused of unfair trade practices.

In a joint action with the Federal Trade Commission, Weiser's office alleged what it called a "pattern of deceptive pricing" identified through a Consumer Protection Bureau investigation. According to the state, Greystar advertised attractive monthly rents while concealing additional mandatory recurring charges covering services such as pest control, trash removal, concierge services, utility management, and amenity access. The state alleged that prospective tenants could not discover the full cost of a unit until after signing a lease and paying non-refundable application fees.

Greystar settled with the state of Colorado for more than $1 million. According to the state's announcement, the funds would be used for "reimbursement of actual costs and attorneys' fees, future consumer protection or antitrust enforcement, consumer education, or public welfare purposes." Under the terms, Greystar must disclose the full monthly cost of leasing a unit, broken down by fee category, and may no longer require deposits before complete pricing has been disclosed to the tenant.

In a separate matter, Colorado joined the U.S. Department of Justice and seven other states in an antitrust suit against RealPage, the Texas-based company that dominates the market for landlord revenue-management software. Weiser's office later amended the complaint to add Greystar, LivCor, Camden Property Trust, Cushman & Wakefield, Willow Bridge, and Cortland as defendants, alleging the companies coordinated through RealPage's software to suppress competition on rental pricing. Greystar alone operates more than 45,000 rental units in Colorado.

Weiser also reached a settlement with Baron Property Services, which the state alleged had charged tenants for the company's master renters-insurance policy even when those tenants already carried qualifying third-party coverage, in violation of the Colorado Consumer Protection Act. The state separately alleged that Baron, when screening rental applicants, had treated unadjudicated criminal charges as convictions, violating the Rental Application Fairness Act. The settlement required Baron to pay approximately $7,300 in restitution to the 368 affected tenants and an additional $67,635 to the state, and to bring its policies into compliance with both statutes.

==== PFAS contamination ====
In February 2022, Weiser filed a lawsuit against 15 companies that manufactured a firefighting foam containing chemicals known as PFAS (or "forever chemicals"), seeking to make them pay for investigation, cleanup, and monitoring of contamination sites across Colorado. PFAS "have been tied to cancer, birth defects and other illnesses."

According to the complaint, PFAS have been found in soil, surface and ground water in 50 of Colorado's 64 counties. In a 2020 sample covering half of Colorado's public drinking water systems, 34% had detectable PFAS. Contamination sites identified in the complaint spanned the Front Range and included Peterson Air Force Base and Fort Carson near Colorado Springs, Buckley Space Force Base in the Denver area, the U.S. Air Force Academy, the Suncor plant, Colorado's federal airports, and fire districts in Teller and Boulder counties.

In July 2023, Weiser was among 22 state and territorial attorneys general who filed an opposition brief asking the court to reject a proposed $10.3 billion class-action settlement between 3M and the nation's public water providers. The coalition argued that the settlement's structure was inadequate. Every public water provider in the country would be swept into the settlement automatically and would have to take affirmative steps to escape it, even providers that had never sued 3M or tested their water for PFAS.

Providers facing that opt-out decision would not yet know how much money they stood to receive under the settlement, nor in many cases would they have determined whether their systems were contaminated or what remediation might cost. The coalition also objected to an indemnification provision under which 3M could later seek to recover from settling water providers any damages the company paid to third parties. For example, if residents of a contaminated community developed cancer and sued 3M, the company could turn around and demand reimbursement from the local water utility.

On March 29, 2024, the court granted final approval to the settlement with the public water providers, with revisions that raised the payment range to $10.5 to $12.5 billion over 13 years. Of roughly 12,000 covered public water systems nationwide, about 897 opted out. Payments under the agreement began in the third quarter of 2024. The settlement covered only claims by public water suppliers; it did not include the separate, ongoing PFAS-related lawsuits that states, including Colorado, had filed against manufacturers.

==== Catholic Church investigation ====
On October 23, 2019, Weiser released the results of an eight-month investigation revealing that 43 Catholic clergy were credibly accused of sexually abusing at least 166 children throughout the state of Colorado since 1950. On October 16, 2020, it was revealed that all three of Colorado's Catholic Dioceses, the Archdiocese of Denver, the Diocese of Colorado Springs, and Diocese of Pueblo, had paid $6.6 million in compensation to 81 victims of clergy sex abuse within the past year, regardless of how long ago the abuse happened.

On December 1, 2020, Weiser's final report revealed that there were an additional 9 credibly accused clergy and 46 alleged victims in both in the Archdiocese of Denver and its suffragan Diocese of Pueblo. Statewide, 52 Colorado Catholic priests were named in Weiser's final report as committing acts of sex abuse. Prominent Archdiocese of Denver priest Fr. Charles B. Woodrich, also known as "Father Woody," was among those listed. Father Woody was known for his work in local homeless shelters.

==== Economic competition ====
Affordability has been another area Weiser has concentrated on heavily. On February 14, 2024, he filed a lawsuit in Denver District Court over $24.6 billion Kroger-Albertsons merger, as he said this would lead to "stores closing, higher prices, fewer jobs, worse customer service, and less resilient supply chains.” On December 10, 2024, the merger was blocked by a federal district court.

== 2026 Colorado gubernatorial campaign ==
On January 2, 2025, Weiser announced his candidacy to replace term-limited Colorado Governor Jared Polis in the 2026 Colorado gubernatorial election. Weiser's campaign began 2026 with approximately $3.5 million and raised $822,000 in the first quarter of 2026. Significant donors included Merle Chambers and Pat Meyers. Weiser's campaign savings surpassed Bennet's to start 2026, but Rocky Mountain Way, a Super PAC supporting Bennet, made the total funds for each candidate similar.

At the Colorado Democratic Party's State Assembly on March 28, 2026, Weiser won 90% of the delegate vote, and appeared at the top of the ballot for the Colorado Democratic primary on June 30th.

On June 30, 2026, Weiser won the Colorado Democratic gubernatorial primary with 56.7% of the vote, beating U.S. Senator Michael Bennet.

== Personal life ==
In 2002, Weiser married Heidi Wald, a physician, in Philadelphia, Pennsylvania, and they now live together with their two children in Denver.

== Selected publications ==
=== Books ===
- Phil Weiser & Jon Nuechterlein, Digital Crossroads: American Telecommunications Policy in the Internet Age (MIT Press 2013) ISBN 9780262519601.
- Phil Weiser, Stuart Benjamin, Howard Shelanski & James Speta, Telecommunications Law and Policy (Carolina Academic Press 2012) ISBN 978-1-61163-691-8.
- Phil Weiser, The Jury and Democracy: How Jury Deliberation Promotes Civic Engagement and Political Participation (Oxford University Press 2010) ISBN 0195377311.

=== Articles ===
- Weiser, Philip J. (2001). "Federal Common Law, Cooperative Federalism, and the Enforcement of the Telecom Act". N.Y.U. L. Rev. 76 (6): 1692.
- Weiser, Philip J. (2003). "Cooperative Federalism and Its Challenges". Mich. St. L. Rev. 2003: 727.
- Weiser, Philip J. (2003). "Justice White and Judicial Review". U. Colo. L. Rev. 74: 1305.
- Weiser, Philip J. (2003). "Regulatory Challenges and Models of Regulation" (PDF). J. On Telecomm. And High Tech. L. 2: 1.
- Weiser, Philip J. (2003). "Toward A Next Generation Regulatory Regime" (PDF). Loyola L. Rev. 35: 41.
- Weiser, Philip J. (2005). "First Principles for an Effective Rewrite of the Telecommunications Act of 1996". AEI-Brookings Joint Center Paper Series. SSRN 707124.
- Weiser, Philip J.; Hatfield, Dale N. (2005). "Policing the Spectrum Commons". Fordham L. Rev. 75 (2): 74.
- Weiser, Philip J. (2005). "The Ghost of Telecommunications Past". Mich. L. Rev. 103 (6): 1671.
- Weiser, Philip J. (2005). "The Relationship of Antitrust and Regulation in A Deregulatory Era". Antitrust Bulletin. 50 (September 2005). SSRN 814945.
- Weiser, Philip J. (2010). "What Carrier Doesn't Address" (PDF). Ala. L. Rev. 61 (3): 571.

== See also ==
- List of Jewish American jurists
- List of law clerks for the sixth seat of the Supreme Court of the United States
- Attorney General Alliance

Academic offices
Preceded by David Getches	Dean of the University of Colorado Law School; 2011–2016	Succeeded by James Anaya
Party political offices
Preceded by Jared Polis	Democratic nominee for Governor of Colorado; 2026	Most recent
Legal offices
Preceded by Cynthia Coffman	Attorney General of Colorado; 2019–present	Incumbent
Political offices
Preceded by Jared Polis	Governor of Colorado; Taking office 2027	Elect
