= 2010 Colorado elections =

A general election was held in the U.S. state of Colorado on November 2, 2010. All of Colorado's executive officers were up for election as well as a United States Senate seat and all of Colorado's seven seats in the United States House of Representatives. Primary elections were held on August 10, 2010.

== Federal ==
=== United States Senate ===
Incumbent Senator and Democratic nominee Michael Bennet defeated Republican nominee Ken Buck in the general election.

=== United States House ===
All seven Colorado seats in the United States House of Representatives were up for election in 2010.

== Attorney General ==
2010 Colorado Attorney General election
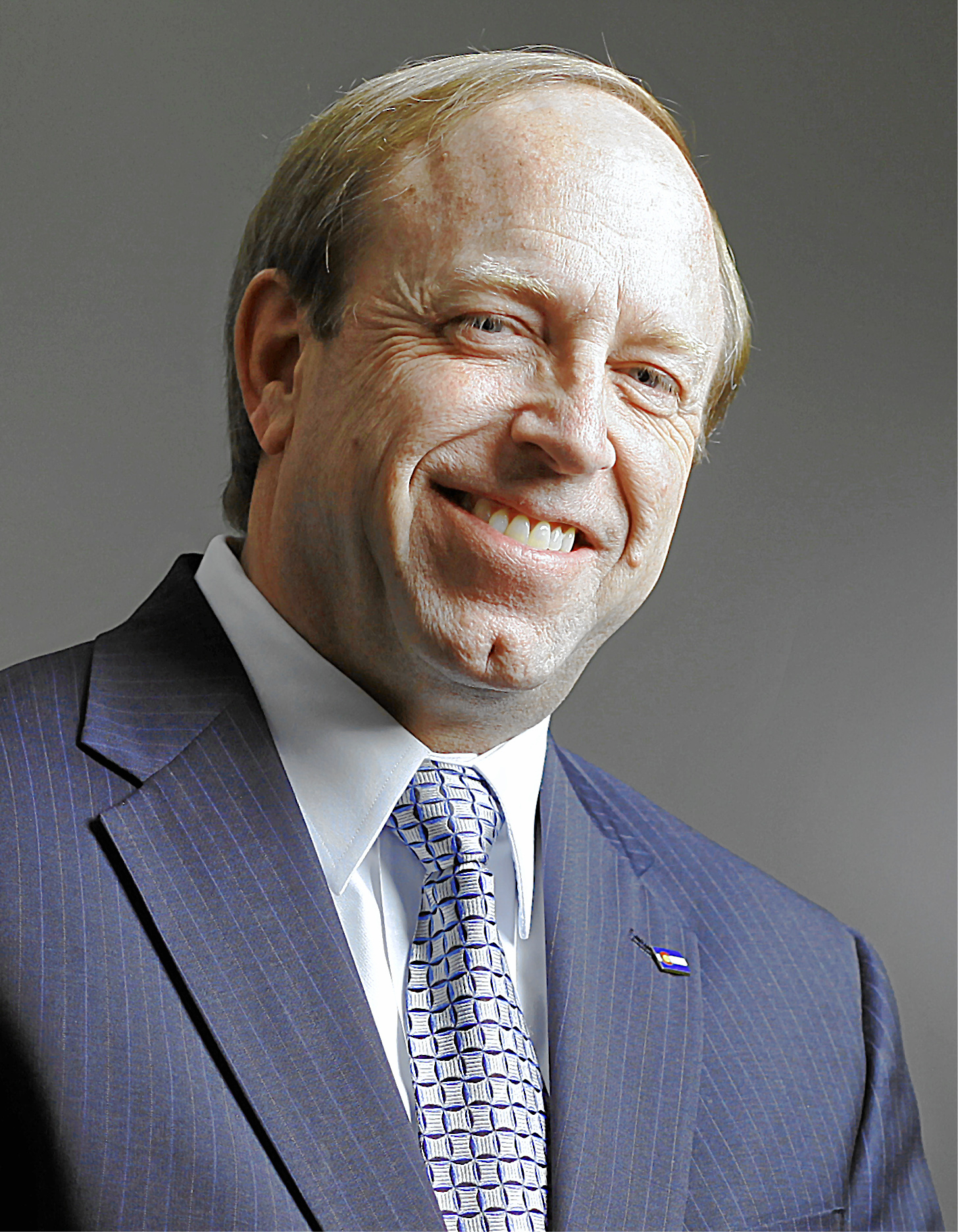

Nominee	John Suthers	Stan Garnett
Party	Republican	Democratic
Popular vote	960,143	743,750
Percentage	56.35%	43.65%
- Suthers: 50–60% 60–70% 70–80% 80–90% >90% Garnett: 50–60% 60–70% 70–80% 80–90% >90% Tie: 50%
Attorney General before election
John Suthers
Republican
Elected Attorney General
John Suthers
Republican

Despite being courted in 2008 and 2010 to run for the U.S. Senate, incumbent Republican Attorney General John Suthers chose to run for re-election. Suthers defeated his Democratic opponent, Stan Garnett, by a 13-point margin – the largest margin of victory in a statewide race in Colorado in 2010. As of 2026, this was the last time a Republican would win Colorado by double digits.

2010 Colorado Attorney General election
Party	Candidate	Votes	%
Republican	John Suthers (incumbent)	960,143	56.35%
Democratic	Stan Garnett	743,750	43.65%
Total votes		1,703,893	100.00%
Republican hold			

== Secretary of State ==
2010 Colorado Secretary of State election
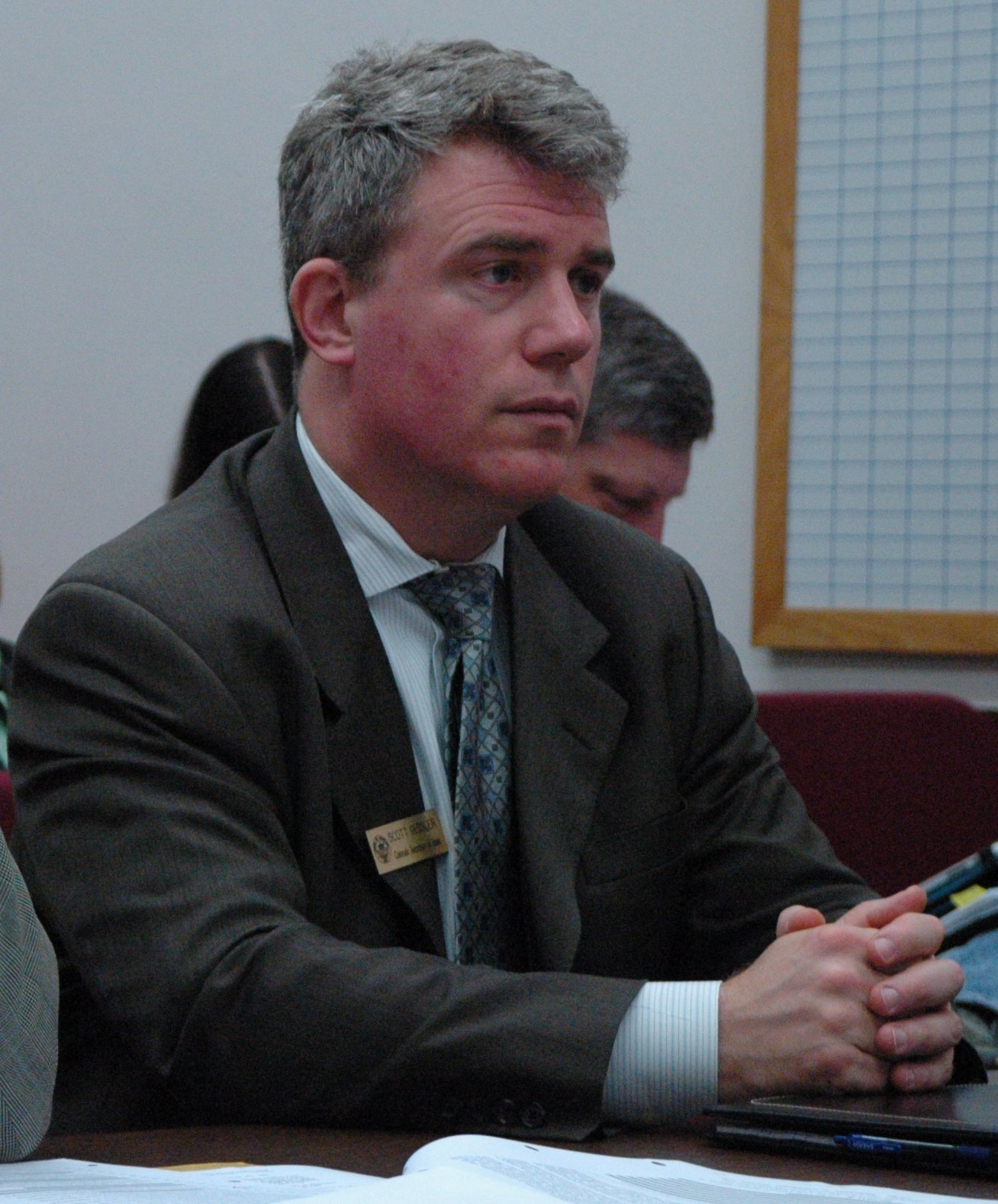

Nominee	Scott Gessler	Bernie Buescher	Amanda Campbell
Party	Republican	Democratic	American Constitution
Popular vote	852,818	755,522	113,756
Percentage	49.52%	43.87%	6.61%
- Gessler: 40–50% 50–60% 60–70% 70–80% Buescher: 40–50% 50–60% 60–70%
Secretary of State before election
Bernie Buescher
Democratic
Elected Secretary of State
Scott Gessler
Republican

In 2009, Democrat Bernie Buescher was appointed by Governor Bill Ritter to serve as Colorado Secretary of State, succeeding Republican Mike Coffman. Buescher ran for a full term in 2010 but lost to Republican Scott Gessler by 5.7%.

2010 Colorado Secretary of State election
Party	Candidate	Votes	%
Republican	Scott Gessler	852,818	49.52%
Democratic	Bernie Buescher (incumbent)	755,522	43.87%
Constitution	Amanda Campbell	113,756	6.61%
Total votes		1,722,096	100.00%
Republican gain from Democratic			

== State Treasurer ==
2010 Colorado State Treasurer election
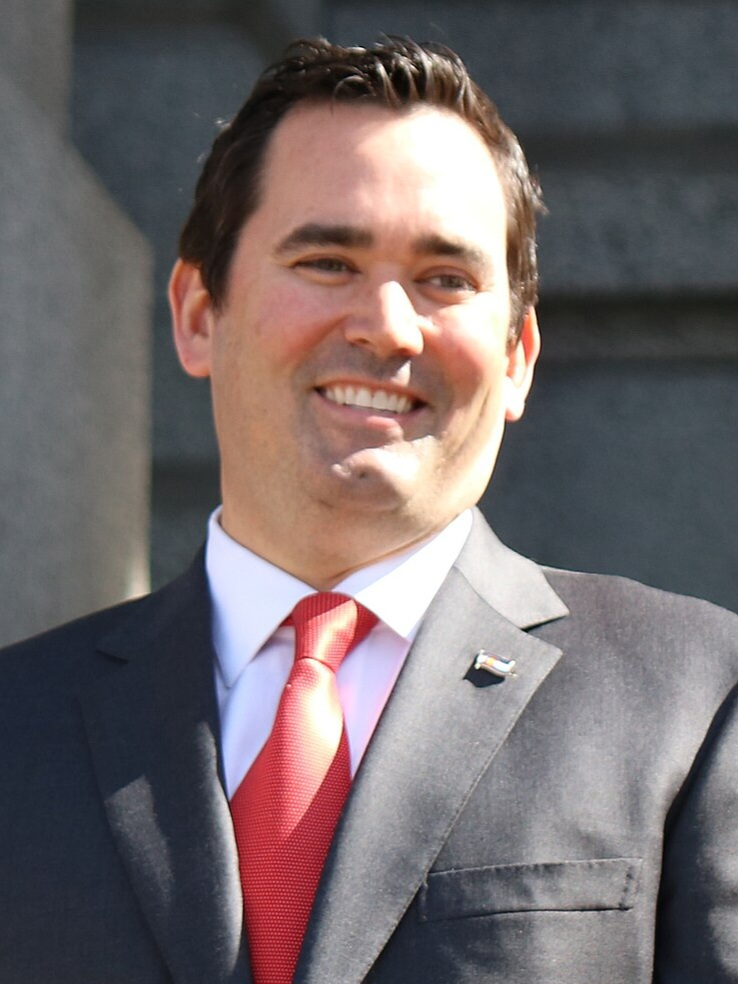

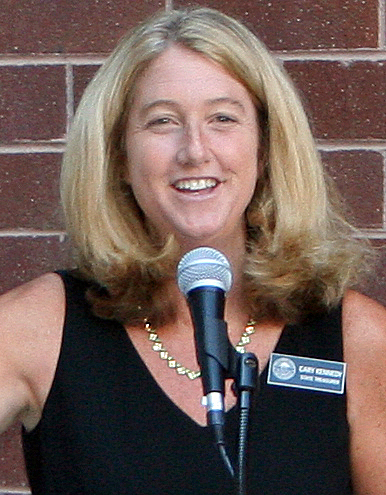
Nominee	Walker Stapleton	Cary Kennedy
Party	Republican	Democratic
Popular vote	866,934	842,877
Percentage	50.70%	49.30%
- Stapleton: 50–60% 60–70% 70–80% Kennedy: 50–60% 60–70% 70–80%
Treasurer before election
Cary Kennedy
Democratic
Elected Treasurer
Walker Stapleton
Republican

Incumbent Democratic State Treasurer Cary Kennedy unsuccessfully ran for re-election, narrowly losing to her Republican opponent Walker Stapleton.

2010 Colorado State Treasurer election
Party	Candidate	Votes	%
Republican	Walker Stapleton	866,934	50.70%
Democratic	Cary Kennedy (incumbent)	842,877	49.30%
Total votes		1,709,811	100.00%
Republican gain from Democratic			

== State legislature ==
=== State Senate ===
One-half of the seats of the Colorado Senate were up for election in 2010.

=== State House of Representatives ===
All of the seats in the Colorado House of Representatives were up for election in 2010.

== Judicial elections ==
Multiple judicial positions were up for election in 2010.

- Colorado judicial elections, 2010 at Ballotpedia

== Ballot measures ==
Seven measures were certified for the 2010 ballot.

- Colorado 2010 ballot measures at Ballotpedia
- 2010 Colorado Amendment 62

Amendment 60 results by county No: 80–90%; 70–80%; 60–70%; 50–60%

Amendment 61 results by county No: 80–90%; 70–80%; 60–70%; 50–60%

Amendment 62 results by county No: 80–90%; 70–80%; 60–70%; 50–60%

Amendment 63 results by county No: 70–80%; 60–70%; 50–60%; Yes: 60–70%; 50–60%

Amendment P results by county No: 70–80%; 60–70%; 50–60%

Amendment Q results by county Yes: 60–70%; 50–60%; No: 60–70%; 50–60%

Amendment R results by county No: 70–80%; 60–70%; 50–60%

Proposition 101 results by county No: 80–90%; 70–80%; 60–70%; 50–60%

Proposition 102 results by county No: 70–80%; 60–70%; 50–60%

== Local ==
Many elections for county offices were also held on November 2, 2010.
