= Mayoral elections in Aurora, Colorado =

Nonpartisan elections are currently held every four years to elect the mayor of Aurora, Colorado.

== 1999 ==
1999 Aurora mayoral election
- November 2, 1999
Candidate	Paul Tauer	Brenda Hilliard
Party	Nonpartisan	Nonpartisan
Popular vote	28,191	8,354
Percentage	77.14%	22.86%
Mayor before election
Paul Tauer
Elected mayor
Paul Tauer

The 1999 Aurora mayoral election was held on November 2, 1999. It saw the re-election of the incumbent mayor Paul Tauer.

Election results
Candidate	Votes	%
Paul Tauer (incumbent)	28,191	77.14
Brenda Hilliard	8,354	22.86
Total votes	36,545	

== 2003 ==
2003 Aurora mayoral election
- November 4, 2003
Candidate	Ed Tauer	Debra Vickrey	Bob LeGare
Party	Nonpartisan	Nonpartisan	Nonpartisan
Popular vote	17,739	11,452	10,758
Percentage	44.40%	28.67%	26.93%
Mayor before election
Paul Tauer
Elected mayor
Ed Tauer

The 2003 Aurora mayoral election was held on November 4, 2003. It saw the election of Ed Tauer, a former member of the Aurora City Council.

Election results
Candidate	Votes	%
Ed Tauer	17,739	44.40
Debra Vickrey	11,452	28.67
Bob LeGare	10,758	26.93
Total votes	39,949	

== 2007 ==
2007 Aurora mayoral election
- November 6, 2007
Candidate	Ed Tauer	Francis Peter Maks Jr.
Party	Nonpartisan	Nonpartisan
Popular vote	24,390	9,673
Percentage	71.6%	28.4%
Mayor before election
Ed Tauer
Elected mayor
Ed Tauer

The 2007 Aurora mayoral election was held on November 6, 2007. It saw the reelection of the incumbent mayor Ed Tauer.

Election results
Candidate	Votes	%
Ed Tauer (incumbent)	24,390	71.6
Francis Peter Maks Jr.	9,673	28.4
Total votes	34,063	

== 2011 ==
2011 Aurora mayoral election
- November 1, 2011
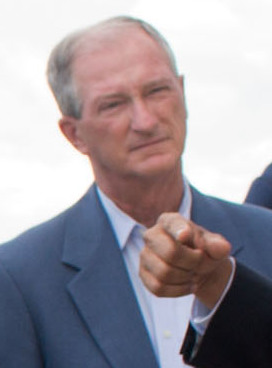

Candidate	Steve Hogan	Ryan L. Frazier
Party	Nonpartisan	Nonpartisan
Popular vote	14,584	12,277
Percentage	36.73%	30.92%
Candidate	Jude Sandvall	Debbie Stafford
Party	Nonpartisan	Nonpartisan
Popular vote	5,905	4,607
Percentage	14.87%	11.60%
Mayor before election
Ed Tauer
Elected mayor
Steve Hogan
Republican

The 2011 Aurora mayoral election was held on November 1, 2011. It saw the election of Steve Hogan, a former member of the Colorado House of Representatives.

Election results
Candidate	Votes	%
Steve Hogan	14,584	36.73
Ryan L. Frazier	12,277	30.92
Jude Sandvall	5,905	14.87
Debbie Stafford	4,607	11.60
Sheilah Thomas Davis	1,359	3.42
Barbara Yamrick	979	2.47
Total votes	39,711	

== 2015 ==
2015 Aurora mayoral election
- November 3, 2015
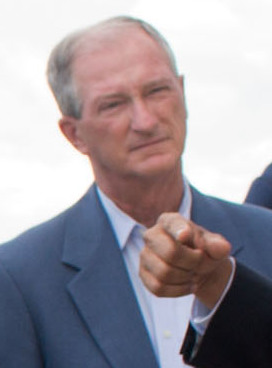
Candidate	Steve Hogan
Party	Nonpartisan
Popular vote	2,516
Percentage	100.00%
Mayor before election
Steve Hogan
Republican
Elected mayor
Steve Hogan
Republican

The 2015 Aurora mayoral election was held on November 3, 2015. It saw the re-election of the incumbent mayor Steve Hogan, who ran unopposed in the election.

On May 13, 2018, Steve Hogan died from cancer. Bob LeGare, a member of the city council, was elected by the council and assumed the office of mayor on June 25.

== 2019 ==
2019 Aurora mayoral election
- November 5, 2019
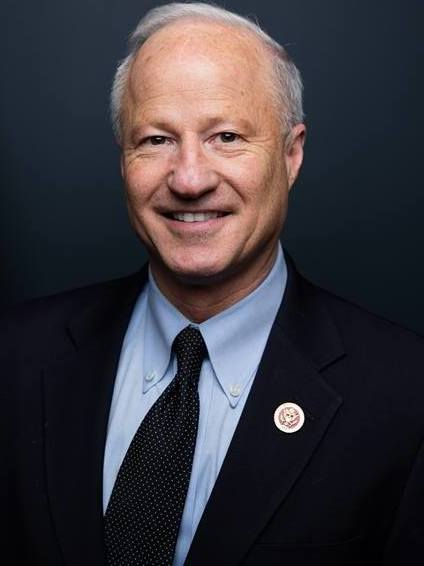

Candidate	Mike Coffman	Omar Montgomery
Party	Nonpartisan	Nonpartisan
Popular vote	26,690	26,475
Percentage	35.76%	35.48%
Candidate	Ryan Frazier	Marsha Berzins
Party	Nonpartisan	Nonpartisan
Popular vote	12,063	8,015
Percentage	16.16%	10.74%
Mayor before election
Bob LeGare
Independent
Elected mayor
Mike Coffman
Republican

The 2019 Aurora mayoral election was held on November 5, 2019. It saw the election of Mike Coffman, a former representative for Colorado in the United States Congress.

=== Candidates ===
The incumbent mayor Bob LeGare, who assumed the office following the death in office of Steve Hogan, did not seek reelection. The following six individuals were the candidates for the office of mayor:

- Marsha Berzins, Aurora City Council member from Ward 3
- Mike Coffman, former United States Congressman from Colorado's 6th congressional district (2009–2019), former Secretary of State of Colorado (2007–2009), former Colorado State Treasurer (1999–2005; 2006–2007), former member of the Colorado House of Representatives from the 40th district (1993–1994), former member of the Colorado House of Representatives from the 49th district (1989–1993)
- Ryan Frazier, former at-large Aurora City Council member
- Tiffany Grays (write-in candidate)
- Omar Montgomery, President of the Aurora chapter of the NAACP and director of educational opportunity programs at the University of Colorado Denver
- Rennie Peterson, former Aurora City Council member from Ward 2 (2005–2017)

The candidates collectively raised more than $1 million in contributions.

=== General election ===
The results were not immediately clear on election night, as more than 1,000 ballots had unsettled signature discrepancies. This was enough that Coffman's apparent margin of victory over Montgomery could be overcome. The counting of ballots ended on November 14, and Montgomery formally conceded on November 17.

Election results
Candidate	Votes	%
Mike Coffman	26,690	35.76
Omar Montgomery	26,475	35.48
Ryan Frazier	12,063	16.16
Marsha Berzins	8,015	10.74
Renie Peterson	1,368	1.83
Write-in	19	0.00
Total votes	74,630	

== 2023 ==
2023 Aurora mayoral election
- November 7, 2023
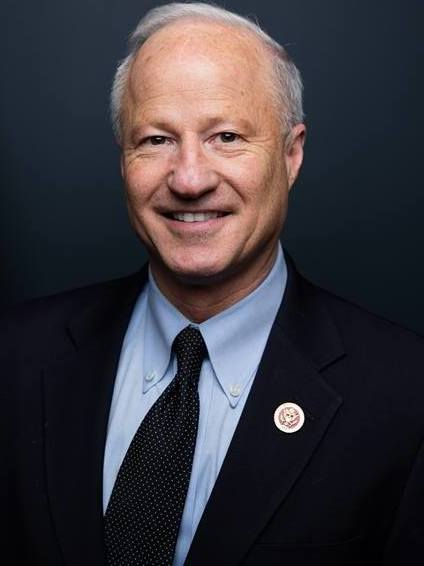

Candidate	Mike Coffman	Juan Marcano	Jeffrey Sanford
Party	Nonpartisan	Nonpartisan	Nonpartisan
Popular vote	41,867	32,323	5,454
Percentage	52.57%	40.58%	6.85%
Mayor before election
Mike Coffman
Republican
Elected mayor
Mike Coffman
Republican

The 2023 Aurora mayoral election was held on November 7, 2023. Incumbent Republican mayor Mike Coffman ran for re-election to a second term in office.

=== Candidates ===
==== Declared ====
- Mike Coffman, incumbent mayor (party affiliation: Republican)
- Juan Marcano, city councilor (party affiliation: Democratic)

==== Filed paperwork ====
- Kirk Denem Manzanares (party affiliation: Democratic)

==== Withdrawn ====
- Rob Andrews, job placement nonprofit director (party affiliation: Democratic)

=== General election ===
Election results
Candidate	Votes	%
Mike Coffman (Incumbent)	42,867	52.67%
Juan Marcano	32,323	40.58%
Jeffery Sanford	5,454	6.85%
Total votes	79,644	

== See also ==
- List of mayors of Aurora, Colorado
