= Gulf War syndrome =

Chronic and multi-symptomatic disorder

- Other names: Chronic multisymptom illness
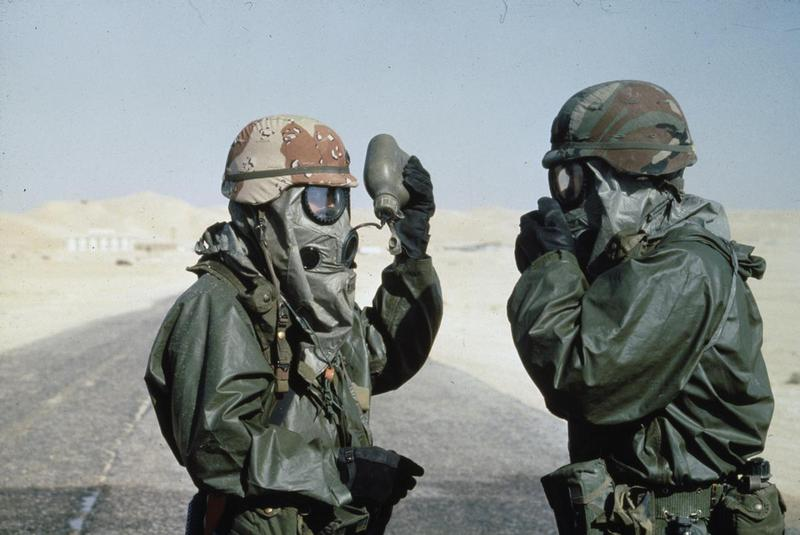
- US soldiers wearing M17 gas masks. Several symptoms of Gulf War syndrome are similar to that of nerve gas poisoning.
- Symptoms: Vary somewhat among individuals and include fatigue, headaches, cognitive dysfunction, musculoskeletal pain, insomnia, and respiratory, gastrointestinal, and dermatologic complaints. Loss of limb function, numbness, irrational fear and rage, and nightmares are also common factors.
- Duration: Life-long
- Causes: Exposure to acetylcholinesterase inhibitors such as sarin, and possibly other toxic exposures during the 1990–91 Persian Gulf War. See Congressional records for testimony about chemical weapon disposal accident.
- Risk factors: Lower levels of PON1, a protein in humans responsible for breaking down organophosphates.
- Differential diagnosis: myalgic encephalomyelitis/chronic fatigue syndrome (ME/CFS); fibromyalgia; multiple sclerosis (MS)
- Frequency: 25% to 34% of the 697,000 U.S. troops of the 1990–91 Gulf War
- Named after: Gulf War

Gulf War syndrome (GWS) also known as Gulf War illness or chronic multi-symptom Illness, is a chronic and multi-symptomatic disorder affecting military veterans of the Gulf War (1990–1991). A wide range of acute and chronic symptoms have been linked to the illness, including fatigue, muscle pain, cognitive problems, insomnia, rashes and diarrhea. Approximately 250,000 of the 697,000 U.S. veterans who served in the Gulf War have an enduring chronic multi-symptom illness. From 1995 to 2005, the health of combat veterans worsened in comparison with nondeployed veterans, with the onset of more new chronic diseases, functional impairment, repeated clinic visits and hospitalizations, myalgic encephalomyelitis/chronic fatigue syndrome-like illness, post-traumatic stress disorder, and greater persistence of adverse health incidents.

Since 2022, Gulf War syndrome has been primarily linked to exposure to sub-lethal amounts of organophosphate nerve agents, particularly sarin and cyclosarin, released atmospherically during Coalition attacks on Iraqi chemical weapons facilities. Susceptibility was influenced by an allele in the PON1 gene. Exposure to pesticides containing other organophosphates and exposure to pills containing pyridostigmine bromide, also referred to as nerve agent pre-treatment sets (NAPS) tablets, used as a pre-treatment to protect against nerve agent effects, has been found to be associated with the neurological effects seen in Gulf War syndrome. Other potential causes that have been investigated are mustard gas and emissions from oil well fires, but their relationships to the illness are not as clear. Gulf War illness is not the result of combat or other stressors, and Gulf War veterans have lower rates of post-traumatic stress disorder (PTSD) than veterans of other wars.

The Royal British Legion said research suggested up to 33,000 UK Gulf War veterans could be living with Gulf War illness, with 1,300 claiming a war pension for conditions connected to their service. In 2007 the Royal British Legion produced a comprehensive report entitled Legacy of Suspicion, which made recommendations about necessary research and compensation. The Royal British Legion is still campaigning for the UK government to properly address symptoms experienced by veterans of the Gulf War.

According to a 2013 report by the Iraq and Afghanistan Veterans of America, veterans of the U.S. wars in Iraq and Afghanistan may also have Gulf War illness, though later findings identified causes that would not have been present in those wars.

== Signs and symptoms ==
According to the Institute of Medicine (IOM), part of the U.S. National Academy of Sciences, 250,000 of the 696,842 U.S. servicemen and women in the 1991 Gulf War continue to be affected by chronic multi-symptom illness, which the IOM refers to as Gulf War illness. The IOM found that it continued to affect these veterans 20 years after the war.

It is clear that a significant portion of the soldiers deployed to the Gulf War have experienced troubling constellations of symptoms that are difficult to categorize. Unfortunately, symptoms that cannot be easily quantified are sometimes incorrectly dismissed as insignificant and receive inadequate attention and funding by the medical and scientific establishment. Veterans who continue to suffer from these symptoms deserve the very best that modern science and medicine can offer to speed the development of effective treatments, cures, and—we hope—prevention. Our report suggests a path forward to accomplish this goal, and we believe that through a concerted national effort and rigorous scientific input, answers can be found.

— IOM committee chair Stephen L. Hauser, professor and chair, department of neurology, University of California, San Francisco.

Veterans showed medically unexplained symptoms. Many of the biological pathways affected by illness are unclear, such as why symptoms are diverse in some and specific in others. A lack of data on veterans' pre-deployment and immediate post-deployment health status and lack of measurement and monitoring of the various substances to which veterans may have been exposed make it difficult to reconstruct what happened to service members during their deployments. The IOM report called for a substantial commitment to improving identification and treatment of multi-symptom illness in Gulf War veterans focussing on continued monitoring of Gulf War veterans, improved medical care, examination of genetic differences between symptomatic and asymptomatic groups and studies of environment-gene interactions.

A variety of signs and symptoms have been associated with GWI:

Excess prevalence of general symptoms *
Symptom	U.S.	UK	Australia	Denmark
Fatigue	23%	23%	10%	16%
Headache	17%	18%	7%	13%
Memory problems	32%	28%	12%	23%
Muscle/joint pain	18%	17%	5%	2% (<2%)
Diarrhea	16%		9%	13%
Dyspepsia/indigestion	12%		5%	9%
Neurological problems	16%		8%	12%
Terminal tumors	33%		9%	11%

* This table applies only to coalition forces involved in combat.

Excess prevalence of recognized medical conditions
Condition	U.S.	UK	Canada	Australia
Skin conditions	20–21%	21%	4–7%	4%
Arthritis/joint problems	6–11%	10%	(-1)–3%	2%
Gastro-intestinal (GI) problems	15%		5–7%	1%
Respiratory problem	4–7%	2%	2–5%	1%
Chronic fatigue syndrome	1–4%	3%		0%
Post-traumatic stress disorder	2–6%	9%	6%	3%
Chronic multi-symptom illness	13–25%	26%		

Birth defects have been suggested as a consequence of Gulf War deployment. However, a 2006 review of several studies of international coalition veterans' children found no strong or consistent evidence of an increase in birth defects, finding a modest increase in birth defects that was within the range of the general population, in addition to being unable to exclude recall bias as an explanation for the results. A 2008 report stated that "it is difficult to draw firm conclusions related to birth defects and pregnancy outcomes in Gulf War veterans", observing that while there have been "significant, but modest, excess rates of birth defects in children of Gulf War veterans", the "overall rates are still within the normal range found in the general population". The same report called for more research on the issue.

=== Comorbid illnesses ===
Persian Gulf War veterans have an increased risk of multiple sclerosis.

A 2017 study by the U.S. Department of Veterans Affairs found that veterans possibly exposed to chemical warfare agents at Khamisiyah experienced different patterns of brain cancer mortality risk compared to the other groups, with veterans possibly exposed having a higher risk of brain cancer in the time period immediately following the Gulf War.

=== Iraqi veterans ===
Opposing Iraqi veterans of the Iraqi Army in the Gulf War also experienced acute and chronic symptoms associated with Gulf War syndrome, although this group is understudied compared to U.S. veterans. A 2011 study in the U.S. Army Medical Department Journal reported Iraqi veterans of the Gulf War had a higher prevalence of somatic disorders as compared to Iraqi civilians, with risk greater in troops stationed in Kuwait.

In comparison to Allied troops, health symptoms were similar amongst Iraqi veterans:

Risk of health symptoms
Symptom	Odds ratios (95% CI) - Zone 1 vs Zone 3
Headaches	3.65 (2.51–5.31)
Respiratory disorder	4.09 (2.60–6.43)
Genitourinary disorder	4.06 (2.65–6.21)
Musculoskeletal disorder	4.33 (2.96–6.33)
Chronic fatigue	126.3 (29.9–532.8)
Skin disorders	1.89 (1.24–2.87)
Miscellaneous disorders	4.43 (2.44–8.05)

* Zone 1 = In Kuwait, Zone 3 = 360 km from Kuwait.

== Causes ==
Many of the symptoms of Gulf War illness are similar to the symptoms of organophosphate, mustard gas, and nerve gas poisoning. Gulf War veterans were exposed to a number of sources of these compounds, including nerve gas and pesticides. In 2022, researchers led by Robert Haley, MD at University of Texas Southwestern Medical Center found that exposure to sarin nerve gas in soldiers who had a particular genetic mutation that prevented them from breaking down the nerve gas is likely to be responsible for the syndrome. The findings and an editorial by two leading epidemiologists were published in Environmental Health Perspectives.

The United States Congress mandated the U.S. Department of Veterans Affairs' contract with the National Academy of Sciences (NAS) to provide reports on Gulf War illnesses. Between 1998 and 2009, the NAS's Institute of Medicine (IOM) authored ten such reports. In addition to the many physical and psychological issues involved in any war zone deployment, Gulf War veterans were exposed to a unique mix of hazards not previously experienced during wartime. These included pyridostigmine bromide pills (given to protect troops from the effects of nerve agents), depleted uranium munitions, and multiple simultaneous vaccinations including anthrax and botulinum toxin vaccines. The oil and smoke that spewed for months from hundreds of burning oil wells presented another exposure hazard not previously encountered in a war zone. Military personnel also had to cope with swarms of insects, requiring the widespread use of pesticides. High-powered microwaves were used to disrupt Iraqi communications, and though it is unknown whether this might have contributed to the syndrome, research has suggested that safety limits for electromagnetic radiation are too lenient.

The Research Advisory Committee on Gulf War Veterans' Illnesses (RAC), a VA federal advisory committee mandated by Congress in legislation enacted in 1998, found that pre-2005 studies suggested the veterans' illnesses are neurological and apparently are linked to exposure to neurotoxins, such as the nerve gas sarin, the anti-nerve gas drug pyridostigmine bromide, and pesticides that affect the nervous system. The RAC concluded in 2004 that, "research studies conducted since the war have consistently indicated that psychiatric illness, combat experience or other deployment-related stressors do not explain Gulf War veterans illnesses in the large majority of ill veterans."

The RAC concluded that "exposure to pesticides and/or to PB [pyridostigmine bromide nerve agent protective pills] are causally associated with GWI and the neurological dysfunction in GW veterans. Exposure to sarin and cyclosarin and to oil well fire emissions are also associated with neurologically based health effects. Gene-environment interactions are likely to have contributed to development of GWI in deployed veterans. The health consequences of chemical exposures in the GW and other conflicts have been called "toxic wounds" by veterans. This type of injury requires further study and concentrated treatment research efforts that may also benefit other occupational groups with similar exposure-related illnesses."

=== Sarin nerve agent ===
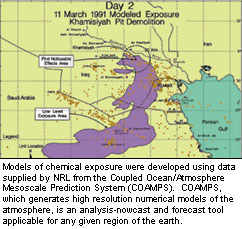

Low-level exposure to nerve agents has been suggested as the cause of GWI. In 1991, Chemical detection units from Czechoslovakia, France, and Britain confirmed chemical agents. French detection units detected chemical agents. Both Czech and French forces reported detections immediately to U.S. forces. U.S. forces detected, confirmed, and reported chemical agents; and U.S. soldiers were awarded medals for detecting chemical agents. The Riegle Report said that chemical alarms went off 18,000 times during the Gulf War. Initially, the report claimed that after the air war started on January 16, 1991, coalition forces were chronically exposed to low, nonlethal levels of chemical and biological agents released primarily by direct Iraqi attack via missiles, rockets, artillery, or aircraft munitions and by fallout from allied bombings of Iraqi chemical warfare munitions facilities.

However, in 1997, the US Government released an unclassified report that stated:

The US Intelligence Community (IC) has assessed that Iraq did not use chemical weapons during the Gulf war. However, based on a comprehensive review of intelligence information and relevant information made available by the United Nations Special Commission (UNSCOM), we conclude that chemical warfare (CW) agent was released as a result of US post-war demolition of rockets with chemical warheads in a bunker (called Bunker 73 by Iraq) and a pit in an area known as Khamisiyah.

Over 125,000 U.S. troops and 9,000 U.K. troops were exposed to nerve gas and mustard gas when the Iraqi depot in Khamisiyah was destroyed. Studies have confirmed earlier suspicions that exposure to sarin, in combination with other contaminants such as pesticides and PB were related to reports of veteran illness. Estimates range from 100,000 to 300,000 individuals exposed to nerve agents.

The 2014 report by the U.S. Department of Veterans Affairs (VA) Research Advisory Committee on Gulf War illnesses (RAC) concluded that, "exposure to the nerve gas agents sarin/cyclosarin has been linked in two more studies to changes in structural magnetic resonance imaging findings that are associated with cognitive decrements, further supporting the conclusion from evidence reviewed in the 2008 report that exposure to these agents is etiologically important to the central nervous system dysfunction that occurs in some subsets of Gulf War veterans."

A 2022 study of 1,016 U.S. Gulf War veterans found evidence of a causal link between GWI and exposure to low levels of sarin, which was released into the air by coalition bombing of Iraqi chemical weapons facilities. Significantly, the study found an increased incidence of GWI not only among veterans who recounted hearing nerve agent alarms, but also among veterans with the RR or QR (as opposed to the QQ) forms of the PON1 gene, which produces an enzyme that deactivates organophosphates (including sarin) through hydrolysis. By contrast, GWI was inversely associated with higher levels of the type Q isozyme, which is more efficient at breaking down sarin than its type R counterpart. The authors "found that the PON1 genotype and hearing nerve agent alarms were independent and the findings robust to both measured and unmeasured confounding, supporting a mechanistic [gene–environment] interaction. ... Moreover, the change in the combined effect from one category to the next was significantly greater than the sum of the independent effects of the environmental exposure and the genotype". Although organophosphate pesticides could have triggered the nerve agent alarms in use at the time and contributed to neurotoxic symptoms similar to GWI, Haley et al. ruled out pesticides as a primary cause of GWI, citing that pesticide use was "ubiquitous long before the approximately 10,000 alarms began sounding at the start of the air campaign when Coalition bombing of Iraqi chemical weapon facilities released the fallout cloud that reached U.S. troop concentrations just as sarin was detected at multiple sites", while "the PON1 R isoenzyme is the more efficient detoxifier of most pesticides."

=== Earlier considered potential causes ===
==== Depleted uranium ====
Major Gulf War engagements in which DU rounds were used

The Gulf War included the first widespread combat usage of depleted uranium (DU), in tank kinetic energy penetrator and autocannon rounds. DU has been suggested as a possible cause of Gulf War syndrome.

A 2008 review by the U.S. Department of Veterans Affairs found no association between DU exposure and multi-symptom illness, concluding that "exposure to DU munitions is not likely a primary cause of Gulf War illness". There is some evidence that long-term exposure to high doses of DU can cause other health problems that are unrelated to GWS. Since 2011, US combat veterans may claim disability compensation for health problems related to exposure to depleted uranium. The Veterans Administration decides these claims on a case-by-case basis.

A 2018 study stated that "the number of Gulf War veterans who developed the Gulf War syndrome following exposure to high quantities of DU has risen to about one-third of the 800,000 U.S. forces deployed", with 25,000 of those having had a premature death. A 2021 study by a team at the University of Portsmouth tested urine samples of 154 US veterans, reporting that no soldiers with the syndrome were exposed to significant amounts of depleted uranium and that DU "is not and never was in the bodies of those who are ill at sufficient quantities to cause disease".

==== Pyridostigmine bromide nerve gas antidote ====
The US military issued pyridostigmine bromide (PB) pills to protect against exposure to nerve gas agents such as sarin and soman. PB was used as a prophylactic against nerve agents; it is not a vaccine. Taken before exposure to nerve agents, PB was thought to increase the efficiency of nerve agent antidotes. PB had been used since 1955 for patients who have myasthenia gravis with doses up to 1,500 mg a day, far in excess of the 90 mg given to soldiers, and was considered safe by the FDA at either level for indefinite use and its use to pre-treat nerve agent exposure had recently been approved.

Given both the large body of epidemiological data on myasthenia gravis patients and follow-up studies done on veterans, it was concluded that while it was unlikely that health effects reported today by Gulf War veterans are the result of exposure solely to PB, use of PB was causally associated with illness. However, a later review by the Institute of Medicine concluded that the evidence was not strong enough to establish a causal relationship.

==== Organophosphates ====
Organophosphate-induced delayed neuropathy (OPIDN, aka organophosphate-induced delayed polyneuropathy) may contribute to the unexplained illnesses of the Gulf War veterans.

===== Organophosphate pesticides =====
The use of organophosphate pesticides and insect repellents during the first Gulf War is credited with keeping rates of pest-borne diseases low. Pesticide use is one of only two exposures consistently identified by Gulf War epidemiologic studies to be significantly associated with Gulf War illness. multi-symptom illness profiles similar to Gulf War illness have been associated with low-level pesticide exposures in other human populations. In addition, Gulf War studies have identified dose-response effects, indicating that greater pesticide use is more strongly associated with Gulf War illness than more limited use. Pesticide use during the Gulf War has also been associated with neurocognitive deficits and neuroendocrine alterations in Gulf War veterans in clinical studies conducted following the end of the war. The 2008 report concluded that "all available sources of evidence combine to support a consistent and compelling case that pesticide use during the Gulf War is causally associated with Gulf War illness."

=== Less likely causes ===
According to the VA's 2008 RAC report, "For several Gulf War exposures, an association with Gulf War illness cannot be ruled out. These include low-level exposure to nerve agents, close proximity to oil well fires, receipt of multiple vaccines, and effects of combinations of Gulf War exposures." However, several potential causes of GWI were deemed, "not likely to have caused Gulf War illness for the majority of ill veterans", including "depleted uranium, anthrax vaccine, fuels, solvents, sand and particulates, infectious diseases, and chemical agent resistant coating (CARC)", for which "there is little evidence supporting an association with Gulf War illness or a major role is unlikely based on what is known about exposure patterns during the Gulf War and more recent deployments."

The VA's 2014 RAC report reinforced its 2008 report findings: "The research reviewed in this report supports and reinforces the conclusion in the 2008 RACGWVI report that exposures to pesticides and pyridostigmine bromide are causally associated with Gulf War illness. Evidence also continues to demonstrate that Gulf War illness is not the result of psychological stressors during the war." It also found additional evidence since the 2008 report for the role of sarin in GWI, but inadequate evidence regarding exposures to oil well fires, vaccines, and depleted uranium to make new conclusions about them.

==== Oil well fires ====
During the war, many oil wells were set on fire in Kuwait by the retreating Iraqi army, and the smoke from those fires was inhaled by large numbers of soldiers, many of whom had acute pulmonary and other chronic effects, including asthma and bronchitis. However, firefighters who were assigned to the oil well fires and encountered the smoke, but who did not take part in combat, have not had GWI symptoms. The 2008 RAC report states that "evidence [linking oil well fires to GWI] is inconsistent or limited in important ways."

==== Anthrax vaccine ====
Iraq had loaded anthrax, botulinum toxin, and aflatoxin into missiles and artillery shells in preparing for the Gulf War and these munitions were deployed to four locations in Iraq. During Operation Desert Storm, 41% of U.S. combat soldiers and 75% of UK combat soldiers were vaccinated against anthrax. Reactions included local skin irritation, some lasting for weeks or months. While the Food and Drug Administration (FDA) approved the vaccine, it never went through large-scale clinical trials.

While recent studies have demonstrated the vaccine is highly reactogenic, there is no clear evidence or epidemiological studies on Gulf War veterans linking the vaccine to Gulf War illness. Combining this with the lack of symptoms from current deployments of individuals who have received the vaccine led the Committee on Gulf War Veterans' Illnesses to conclude that the vaccine is not a likely cause of Gulf War illness for most ill veterans. However, the committee report does point out that veterans who received a larger number of various vaccines in advance of deployment have shown higher rates of persistent symptoms since the war.

However, research was done by PB Asa, Y Cao, and RF Garry on serum antibodies to squalene in Gulf War Syndrome patients. The results showed "the substantial majority (95%) of overtly ill deployed GWS patients had antibodies to squalene. All (100%) GWS patients immunized for service in Desert Shield/Desert Storm who did not deploy, but had the same signs and symptoms as those who did deploy, had antibodies to squalene. In contrast, none (0%) of the deployed Persian Gulf veterans not showing signs and symptoms of GWS have antibodies to squalene. Neither patients with idiopathic autoimmune disease nor healthy controls had detectable serum antibodies to squalene." Their work of the researchers was profiled by Gary Matsumoto in "Vaccine A".

This research and theory was later criticized, and further research has leaned heavily against squalene in vaccinations causing GWS; Perhaps the most important points against this theory include that squalene antibodies have been detected in populations not exposed to squalene containing vaccinations, and that the anthrax vaccines used in the Gulf War did not actually contain squalene in any form.

==== Combat stress ====
Research studies conducted since the war have consistently indicated that psychiatric illness, combat experience or other deployment-related stressors do not explain Gulf War veterans illnesses in the large majority of ill veterans, according to a U.S. Department of Veterans Affairs (VA) review committee. An April 2010 Institute of Medicine review found, "the excess of unexplained medical symptoms reported by deployed [1991] Gulf war veterans cannot be reliably ascribed to any known psychiatric disorder", although they also concluded that "the constellation of unexplained symptoms associated with the Gulf War illness complex could result from interplay between both biological and psychological factors."

== Pathobiology ==
=== Chronic inflammation ===
The 2008 VA report on Gulf War illness and the Health of Gulf War Veterans suggested a possible link between GWI and chronic, nonspecific inflammation of the central nervous system that cause pain, fatigue and memory issues, possibly due to pathologically persistent increases in cytokines and suggested further research be conducted on this issue.

== Diagnosis ==
Clinical diagnosis of Gulf War illness has been complicated by multiple case definitions. In 2014, the National Academy of Sciences Institute of Medicine (IOM)—contracted by the U.S. Department of Veterans Affairs for the task—released a report concluding that the creation of a new case definition for chronic multi-symptom illness in Gulf War veterans was not possible because of insufficient evidence in published studies regarding its onset, duration, severity, frequency of symptoms, exclusionary criteria, and laboratory findings. Instead, the report recommended the use of two case definitions, the "Kansas" definition and the "Centers for Disease Control and Prevention (CDC)" definition, noting: "There is a set of symptoms (fatigue, pain, neurocognitive) that are reported in all the studies that have been reviewed. The CDC definition captures those three symptoms; the Kansas definition also captures them, but it also includes the symptoms reported most frequently by Gulf War veterans."

The Kansas case definition is more specific and may be more applicable for research settings, while the CDC case definition is more broad and may be more applicable for clinical settings.

=== Classification ===
Medical ailments associated with service in the 1990–1991 Gulf War have been recognized by both the U.S. Department of Defense and the U.S. Department of Veterans Affairs.

Before 1998, the terms Gulf War syndrome, Gulf War veterans' illness, unexplained illness, and undiagnosed illness were used interchangeably to describe chronic unexplained symptoms in veterans of the 1991 Gulf War. The term chronic multi-symptom illness (CMI) was first used following publication of a 1998 study describing chronic unexplained symptoms in Air Force veterans of the 1991 Gulf War.

In a 2014 report contracted by the U.S. Department of Veterans Affairs, the National Academy of Sciences Institute of Medicine recommended the use the term Gulf War illness rather than chronic multi-symptom illness. Since that time, relevant publications by the National Academy of Science and the U.S. Department of Defense have used only the term Gulf War illness (GWI).

The U.S. Department of Veterans Affairs (VA) confusingly still uses an array of both old and new terminology for Gulf War illness. VA's specialty clinical evaluation War Related Illness and Injury Study Centers (WRIISCs) use the recommended term Gulf War illness, as do VA's Office of Research and Development (VA-ORD) and many recent VA research publications. However, VA's Public Health website still uses Gulf War veterans' medically unexplained illnesses, chronic multi-symptom illness (CMI), and undiagnosed illnesses, but explains that VA doesn't use the term Gulf War syndrome because of varying symptoms.

The Veterans Health Administration (VHA) originally classified individuals with related ailments believed to be connected to their service in the Persian Gulf a special non-ICD-9 code DX111, as well as ICD-9 code V65.5.

The International Classification of Diseases added a formal diagnostic code for Gulf War illness in October 2025.

=== Kansas definition ===
In 1998, the State of Kansas Persian Gulf Veterans Health Initiative sponsored an epidemiological survey led by Dr. Lea Steele of deployment-related symptoms in 2,030 Gulf War veterans. The result was a "clinically based descriptive definition using correlated symptoms" in six symptom groups: fatigue and sleep problems, pain, neurologic and mood, gastrointestinal, respiratory symptoms, and skin (dermatologic) symptoms.

To meet the "Kansas" case definition, a veteran of the 1990–91 Gulf War must have symptoms in at least three of the six symptom domains, which during the survey were scored based on severity ("severity"). Symptom onset must have developed during or after deploying to the 1990–91 Gulf War theatre of operations ("onset") and must have been present in the year before interview ("duration"). Participants were excluded if they had a diagnosis of or were being treated for any of several conditions that might otherwise explain their symptoms ("exclusionary criteria"), including cancer, diabetes, heart disease, chronic infectious disease, lupus, multiple sclerosis, stroke, or any serious psychiatric condition.

Applying the Kansas case definition to the original Kansas study cohort resulted in a prevalence of Gulf War illness of 34.2% in Gulf War veterans and 8.3% in nondeployed Gulf War era veterans, or an excess rate of GWI of 26.3% in Gulf War veterans.

=== CDC definition ===
Also in 1998, a study published by Dr. Keiji Fukuda under the auspices of the U.S. Centers for Disease Control and Prevention (CDC) examined chronic multi-symptom illness through a cross-sectional survey of 3,675 ill and healthy U.S. Air Force veterans of the 1990–91 Gulf War, including from a Pennsylvania-based Air National Guard unit and three comparison Air Force units. The CDC case definition was derived from clinical data and statistical analyses.

The result was a symptom-category approach to a case definition, with three symptom categories: fatigue, mood–cognition, and musculoskeletal. To meet the case definition, the veteran of the 1990–91 Gulf War must have symptoms in two of the three categories and have experienced the illness for six months or longer ("duration").

The original study also including a determination of severity of symptoms ("severity"). "Severe cases were identified if at least one symptom in each of the required categories was rated as severe. Of 1,155 participating Gulf War veterans, 6% had severe CMI, and 39% had mild to moderate CMI; of the 2,520 nondeployed era veterans, 0.7% had severe and 14% had mild to moderate CMI."

== Treatment ==
A 2013 report by the Institute of Medicine reviewed the peer-reviewed published medical literature for evidence regarding treatments for symptoms associated with chronic multi-symptom illness (CMI) in 1990–91 Gulf War veterans, and in other chronic multi-symptom conditions. For the studies the report reviewed that were specifically regarding CMI in 1990–91 Gulf War veterans (Gulf War illness), the report made the following conclusions:

- Doxycycline: "Although the study of doxycycline was found to have high strength of evidence and was conducted in a group of 1991 Gulf War veterans who had CMI, it did not demonstrate efficacy; that is, doxycycline did not reduce or eliminate the symptoms of CMI in the study population."
- Cognitive behavioral therapy (CBT) and exercise: "These studies evaluated the effects of exercise and CBT in combination and individually. The therapeutic benefit of exercise was unclear in those studies. Group CBT rather than exercise may confer the main therapeutic benefit with respect to physical symptoms."

The report concluded: "On the basis of the evidence reviewed, the committee cannot recommend any specific therapy as a set treatment for [Gulf War] veterans who have CMI. The committee believes that a 'one-size-fits-all' approach is not effective for managing [Gulf War] veterans who have CMI and that individualized health care management plans are necessary."

By contrast, the U.S. Department of Defense (DoD) Congressionally Directed Medical Research Programs (CDMRP) noted in a May 2018 publication that the primary focus of its Gulf War illness Research Program (GWIRP) "has been to fund research studies to identify treatment targets and test interventional approaches to alleviate symptoms. While most of these studies remain in progress, several have already shown varying levels of promise as GWI treatments."

According to the May 2018 DoD publication:

Published Results on Treatments

The earliest federally funded multi-center clinical trials were VA- and DoD-funded trials that focused on antibiotic treatment (doxycycline) (Donta, 2004) and cognitive behavioral therapy with exercise (Donta, 2003). Neither intervention provided long-lasting improvement for a substantial number of Veterans.

Preliminary analysis from a placebo-controlled trial showed that 100 mg of Coenzyme Q10 (known as CoQ10 or Ubiquinone) significantly improved general self-reported health and physical functioning, including among 20 symptoms, each of which was present in at least half of the study participants, with the exception of sleep. These improvements included reducing commonly reported symptoms of fatigue, dysphoric mood, and pain (Golomb, 2014). These results are currently being expanded in a GWIRP-funded trial of a "mitochondrial cocktail" for GWI of CoQ10 plus a number of nutrients chosen to support cellular energy production and defend against oxidative stress. The treatment is also being investigated in a larger, VA- sponsored Phase III trial of Ubiquinol, the reduced form of CoQ10.

In a randomized, sham-controlled VA-funded trial of a nasal CPAP mask (Amin, 2011-b), symptomatic GW Veterans with sleep-disordered breathing receiving the CPAP therapy showed significant improvements in fatigue scores, cognitive function, sleep quality, and measures of physical and mental health (Amin, 2011a).

Preliminary data from a GWIRP-funded acupuncture treatment study showed that Veterans reported significant reductions in pain and both primary and secondary health complaints, with results being more positive in the bi-weekly versus weekly treatment group (Conboy, 2012). Current studies funded by the GWIRP and the VA are also investigating yoga as a treatment for GWI.

An amino acid supplement containing L-carnosine was found to reduce irritable bowel syndrome-associated diarrhea in a randomized, controlled GWIRP-funded trial in GW Veterans (Baraniuk, 2013). Veterans receiving L-carnosine showed a significant improvement in performance in a cognitive task, but no improvement in fatigue, pain, hyperalgesia, or activity levels.

Results from a 26 week GWIRP-funded trial comparing standard care to nasal irrigation with either saline or a xylitol solution revealed that both irrigation protocols reduced GWI respiratory (chronic rhinosinusitis) and fatigue symptoms (Hayer, 2015).

Administration of the glucocorticoid receptor antagonist mifepristone to GW Veterans in a GWIRP-funded randomized trial resulted in an improvement in verbal learning, but no improvement in self-reported physical health or other self-reported measures of mental health (Golier, 2016).

Ongoing Intervention Studies

The GWIRP is currently funding many early-phase clinical trials aimed at GWI. Interventions include direct electrical nerve stimulation, repurposing FDA-approved pharmaceuticals, and dietary protocols and/or nutraceuticals. Both ongoing and closed GWIRP-supported clinical treatment trials and pilot studies can be found at.

A Clinical Consortium Award was offered [in FY2017] to support a group of institutions, coordinated through an Operations Center that will conceive, design, develop, and conduct collaborative Phase I and II clinical evaluations of promising therapeutic agents for the management or treatment of GWI. These mechanisms were designed to build on the achievements of the previously established consortia and to further promote collaboration and resource sharing.

The U.S Congress appropriated $236 million for the GWIRP for treatment research for GWI between federal fiscal years (FY) 2006 and 2021. Congressional appropriations for the GWIRP were $5 million for FY2006, (no funding for FY2007) $10 million for FY2008, $8 million for each year from FY2009 through FY2011, $10 million for FY2012, $20 million for each year from FY2013 through FY2017, $21 million for FY2018, and $22 million for each year from FY2019 through FY2021. Beginning with FY2022, research funding opportunities for Gulf War Illness were moved to the broadly focused Toxic Exposure Research Program (TERP) within the CDMRP.

== Prognosis ==
According to the May 2018 DoD publication cited above, "Research suggests that the GWI symptomology experienced by Veterans has not improved over the last 25 years, with few experiencing improvement or recovery ... . Many [Gulf War] Veterans will soon begin to experience the common co-morbidities associated with aging. The effect that aging will have on this unique and vulnerable population remains a matter of significant concern, and population-based research to obtain a better understanding of mortality, morbidity, and symptomology over time is needed."

== Prevalence ==
The 2008 and 2014 VA (RAC) reports and the 2010 IOM report found that the chronic multi-symptom illness in Gulf War veterans—Gulf War illness—is more prevalent in Gulf War veterans than their non-deployed counterparts or veterans of previous conflicts. While a 2009 study found the pattern of comorbidities similar for actively deployed and nondeployed Australian military personnel, the large body of U.S. research reviewed in the VA and IOM reports showed the opposite in U.S. troops. The VA's 2014 RAC report found Gulf War illness in "an excess of 26–32 percent of Gulf War veterans compared to nondeployed era veterans" in pre-2008 studies, and "an overall multi-symptom illness prevalence of 37 percent in Gulf War veterans and an excess prevalence of 25 percent" in a later, larger VA study.

According to a May 2018 report by the U.S. Department of Defense, "GWI is estimated to have affected 175,000 to 250,000 of the nearly 700,000 troops deployed to the 1990–1991 GW theater of operations. Twenty-seven of the 28 Coalition members participating in the GW conflict have reported GWI in their troops. Epidemiologic studies indicate that rates of GWI vary in different subgroups of GW Veterans. GWI affects Veterans who served in the U.S. Army and Marines Corps at higher rates than those who served in the Navy and Air Force, and U.S. enlisted personnel are affected more than officers. Studies also indicate that GWI rates differ according to where Veterans were located during deployment, with the highest rates among troops who served in forward areas."

== Research ==
Epidemiologic studies have looked at many suspected causal factors for Gulf War illness as seen in veteran populations. Below is a summary of epidemiologic studies of veterans displaying multi-symptom illness and their exposure to suspect conditions from the 2008 U.S. Department of Veterans Affairs report.

In November 2025, a study partially funded by the Dallas Veteran Affairs Medical Center and conducted by UTSouthwestern published their findings in Scientific Reports. Their initial study compared ratios of two chemicals finding the NAA/tCr ratio in the basal ganglia deep within the brain to be lower in veterans with DWI symptoms compared to those without. A decreased NAA (N-acetylaspartate) could suggests a process that stems from nerve damage and a higher tCr (total creatine) could suggests a process that stems from mitochondrial dysfunction, either of which would reduce the ratio. In the new study, 39 patients with GWI and 16 without used state-of-the-art MRS (Magnetic Resonance Spectroscopy) equipment and techniques to find the cause of the ratio difference is due to an increased tCr. Because mitochondrial dysfunction in the brain causes chronic neuro-inflammation, this finding can explain nearly all of the symptoms of GWI according the study.

A fuller understanding of immune function in ill Gulf War veterans is needed, particularly in veteran subgroups with different clinical characteristics and exposure histories. It is also important to determine the extent to which identified immune perturbations may be associated with altered neurological and endocrine processes that are associated with immune regulation. Very limited cancer data have been reported for U.S. Gulf War veterans in general, and no published research on cases occurring after 1999. Because of the extended latency periods associated with most cancers, it is important that cancer information is brought up to date and that cancer rates be assessed in Gulf War veterans on an ongoing basis. In addition, cancer rates should be evaluated in relation to identifiable exposure and location subgroups.

Epidemiologic studies of Gulf War veterans: association of deployment exposures with multi-symptom illness
Suspected causative agent	Preliminary analysis (no controls for exposure)		Adjusted analysis (controlled for effects of exposure)			Clinical evaluations
Suspected causative agent	GWV population in which association was ...		GWV population in which association was ...			Clinical evaluations
Suspected causative agent	assessed	statistically significant	assessed	statistically significant	Dose response effect identified?	Clinical evaluations
Pyridostigmine bromide	10	9	6	6	✓	Associated with neurocognitive and HPA differences in GW vets
Pesticides	10	10	6	5	✓	Associated with neurocognitive and HPA differences in GW vets
Physiological stressors	14	13	7	1		
Chemical weapons	16	13	5	3		Associated with neurocognitive and HPA differences in GW vets
Oil well fires	9	8	4	2	✓	
Number of vaccines	2	2	1	1	✓	
Anthrax vaccine	5	5	2	1		
Tent heater exhaust	5	4	2	1		
Sand / particulates	3	3	3	1		
Depleted uranium	5	3	1	0		

== Controversies ==
An early argument in the years following the Gulf War was that similar syndromes have been seen as an after effect of other conflicts — for example, "shell shock" after World War I, and post-traumatic stress disorder (PTSD) after the Vietnam War. Cited as evidence for this argument was a review of the medical records of 15,000 American Civil War soldiers showing that "those who lost at least 5% of their company had a 51% increased risk of later development of cardiac, gastrointestinal, or nervous disease."

Early Gulf War research also failed to accurately account for the prevalence, duration, and health impact of Gulf War illness. For example, a November 1996 article in the New England Journal of Medicine found no difference in death rates, hospitalization rates, or self-reported symptoms between Persian Gulf veterans and non-Persian Gulf veterans. This article was a compilation of dozens of individual studies involving tens of thousands of veterans. The study did find a statistically significant elevation in the number of traffic accidents Gulf War veterans had. An April 1998 article in Emerging Infectious Diseases similarly found no increased rate of hospitalization and better health on average for veterans of the Persian Gulf War in comparison to those who stayed home.

In contrast to those early studies, in January 2006, a study led by Melvin Blanchard published in the Journal of Epidemiology, part of the "National Health Survey of Gulf War-Era Veterans and Their Families", found that veterans deployed in the Persian Gulf War had nearly twice the prevalence of chronic multi-symptom illness, a cluster of symptoms similar to a set of conditions often at that time called Gulf War Syndrome.

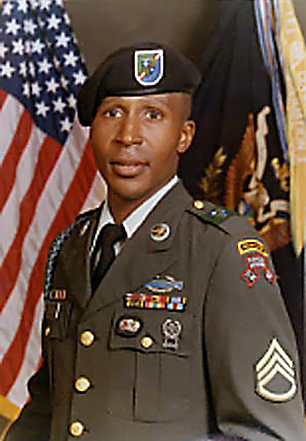
Louis Jones Jr. claimed Gulf War syndrome as a defense in his murder trial

On November 17, 2008, the Department of Veterans Affairs (VA) Research Advisory Committee on Gulf War Veterans' Illnesses (RAC), a Congressionally mandated federal advisory committee composed of VA-appointed clinicians, researchers, and representative Gulf War veterans, issued a major report announcing scientific findings, in part, that "Gulf War illness is real", that GWI is a distinct physical condition, and that it is not psychological in nature. The 454 page report reviewed 1,840 published studies to form its conclusions identifying the high prevalence of Gulf War illness, suggesting likely causes rooted in toxic exposures while ruling out combat stress as a cause, and opining that treatments likely could be found. It recommended that Congress increase funding for treatment-focused Gulf War illness research to at least $60 million per year.

In March 2013, a hearing was held before the Subcommittee on Oversight and Investigations of the Committee on Veterans' Affairs, U.S. House of Representatives, to determine not whether Gulf War illness exists, but rather how it is identified, diagnosed and treated, and how the tools put in place to aid these efforts have been used.

By 2016, the National Academy of Sciences, Engineering, and Medicine (NASEM) concluded there was sufficient evidence of a positive association between deployment to the 1990–1991 Gulf War and Gulf War illness.

=== Jones controversy ===
Louis Jones Jr., the perpetrator of the 1995 murder of Tracie McBride, stated that the Gulf War syndrome caused him to commit the crime and he sought clemency, hoping to avoid the death sentence imposed on him by a federal court. Jones was executed in 2003.

== Related legislation ==
On March 14, 2014, Representative Mike Coffman introduced the Gulf War Health Research Reform Act of 2014 (H.R. 4261; 113th Congress) into the United States House of Representatives, where it passed the House by unanimous consent but then died in Congress when the Senate failed to take action on it. The bill would have altered the relationship between the Research Advisory Committee on Gulf War Veterans' Illnesses (RAC) and the United States Department of Veterans Affairs (VA) under which the RAC is constituted. The bill would have made the RAC an independent organization within the VA, require that a majority of the RAC's members be appointed by Congress instead of the VA, and authorized the RAC to release its reports without needing prior approval from the VA Secretary.

In the year prior to the consideration of this bill, the VA and the RAC were at odds with one another. The VA replaced all but one of the members of the RAC, removed some of their supervisory tasks, tried to influence the board to decide that stress, rather than biology was the cause of Gulf War illness, and told the RAC that it could not publish reports without permission. The RAC was created after Congress decided that the VA's research into the issue was flawed, and focused on psychological causes, while mostly ignoring biological ones.

The RAC was first authorized under the Veterans Programs Enhancement Act of 1998 (Section 104 of Public Law 105–368, enacted November 11, 1998, and now codified as 38 U.S.C. § 527 note). While the law directing its creation mandated that it be established not later than January 1, 1999, the RAC's first charter was not issued until January 23, 2002, by VA Secretary Anthony Principi. The RAC convened for its first meetings on April 11–12, 2002.

== See also ==
- Organophosphate-induced delayed neuropathy
- Ukrainian syndrome
- Environmental issues with war
- Michael Donnelly, an activist for those affected by Gulf War illness
- Burn pits
- Mass psychogenic illness
