= Allegra Saunders =

American politician (1909–1995)

Allegra J. Saunders (April 13, 1909 – February 7, 1995) was an American politician from the state of Colorado. She served in the Colorado State Senate for two terms as a Democrat, from 1959 to 1962, and 1967 to 1970.

Saunders was born in Kansas and was a resident of Denver. She was married to Secretary of State of Colorado George E. Saunders, who served from 1935 to 1941. She was a member of the Colorado State Board of Education, and was serving as its vice chair in 1956. She was also named as a delegate to the 1956 Democratic National Convention. Saunders died in 1995, at the age of 85.
