= Tauer (surname) =

Tauer is a surname of German origin. Notable people with the surname include:

- Ewald Tauer (born 1941), German wrestler
- Jan Tauer (born 1983), German footballer
- Paul Tauer, American politician
