= Steve Hogan =

American politician (1948–2018)

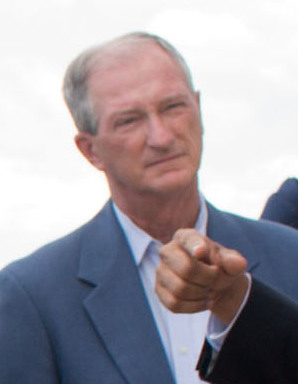
- Hogan in July 2012

Mayor of Aurora, Colorado
- In office November 14, 2011 – May 13, 2018
- Preceded by: Ed Tauer
- Succeeded by: Bob LeGare

Member of the Colorado House of Representatives from the 40th district
- In office January 1975 – January 1977
- Preceded by: John Fuhr
- Succeeded by: Josef “Joe” Winkler III

Personal details
- Born: Stephen Douglas Hogan; May 31, 1948 Lincoln, Nebraska, U.S.
- Died: May 13, 2018 (aged 69) Aurora, Colorado, U.S.
- Party: Republican
- Other political affiliations: Democratic (formerly)
- Spouse: Becky
- Education: University of Denver (BA)

Stephen Douglas Hogan (May 31, 1948 – May 13, 2018) was an American politician who served as the mayor of Aurora, Colorado, from November 2011 until his death in May 2018. Hogan was a member of the Republican Party, and previously sat on the Colorado House of Representatives between 1975 and 1977.

== Early life and career ==
Hogan was born in Lincoln, Nebraska, on May 31, 1948. He received his bachelor's degree from the University of Denver in 1970. In 1970 and 1971, he went to the University of Nebraska College of Law.

Specializing in transport management, Hogan was the executive director of the E-470 Public Highway Authority from 1991 to 1998, leaving that year to run the Northwest Parkway Authority until 2008.

== Political career ==
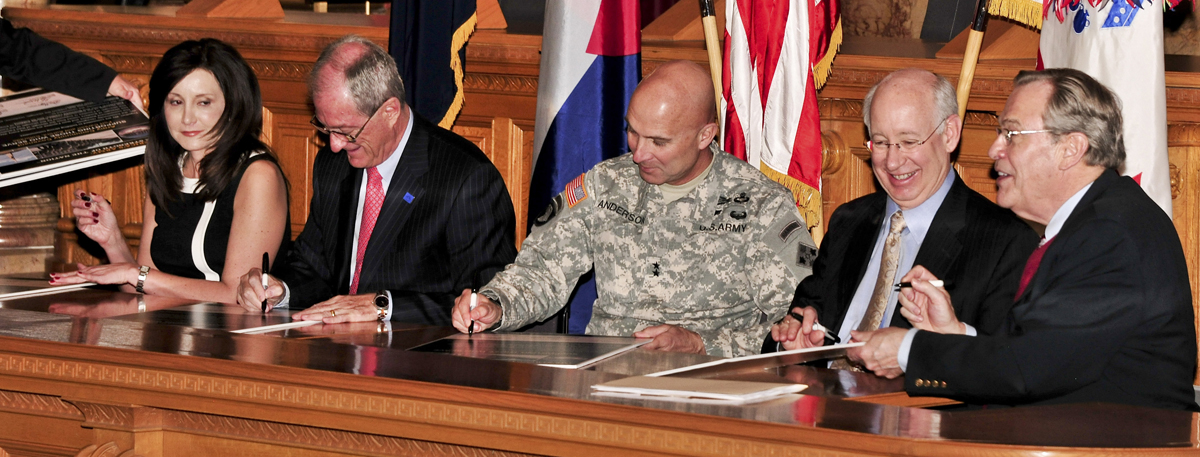
Hogan (second from left) and others sign the Aurora Community Covenant between Aurora and Fort Carson

Elected in 1974, Hogan was a one-term legislator in the Colorado House of Representatives representing the 40th district, which covered most of the Arapahoe County portion of Aurora. At this stage a member of the Democratic Party, Hogan made a run in 1979 for the Aurora City Council, winning in what he described as 'the most competitive council election in decades'. His victory marked the first of six non-consecutive terms as a councilman (1979–1983, 1985–1997, 2001–2009).

Outside of the city council, Hogan has twice been a candidate for the U.S. House of Representatives; the first in 1982, when he was the Democratic nominee in the 6th district against Republican Jack Swigert of Apollo 13 fame, emphasizing his political experience compared to political novice Swigert. Swigert emerged victorious, but died from cancer before he could assume office, and Hogan once more represented the Democrats in the 1983 special election that followed. He ran on a campaign criticizing the economic and defense policies of President Ronald Reagan, whilst advocating higher taxes to reduce the federal deficit, and lost to Republican state senator Dan Schaefer.

At some stage becoming a Republican, Hogan made a second run for the Aurora mayoralty (the first being a failed attempt in 1987) in 2011. He took advantage of his image as an adept budget manager, and was described in The Denver Post as a man with a 'reputation as problem-solver and capable manager' in its endorsement. In the 6-person race, Hogan was seen as the establishment candidate, enjoying bipartisan support, including from the local branch of the AFL–CIO, and won the November election with 37% of the vote.

His mayoralty received international attention when twelve people were killed during the 2012 Aurora, Colorado shooting.

== Awards and recognition ==
Hogan has been the recipient of several awards, including: the Martin Luther King Jr. Award from the City of Aurora; Outstanding Legislator from the Colorado Chapter of Disabled American Veterans; the Community Leadership Award from the Aurora Chamber of Commerce; and the Circle of Life Award from the Northern Aurora Business Association. An extension of East 6th Avenue from SH 30 to just west of the 6th Parkway/E-470 interchange that opened on September 26, 2019 was named “Stephen D. Hogan Parkway” in his honor.

== Personal life and death ==
Hogan served on the Aurora Chamber of Commerce and the Aurora Economic Development Council. Hogan died of cancer on May 13, 2018.
