= Gulf War Health Research Reform Act of 2014 =

US law

- Long title: To improve the research of Gulf War Illness, the Research Advisory Committee on Gulf War Veterans’ Illnesses, and for other purposes.
- Announced in: the 113th United States Congress
- Sponsored by: Rep. Mike Coffman (R, CO-6)
- Number of co-sponsors: 2

Codification
- Acts affected: Veterans Health Care Act of 1992, Federal Advisory Committee Act, Veterans' Benefits Act of 2010, Persian Gulf War Veterans Act of 1998, Veterans' Benefits Improvement Act of 2008
- U.S.C. sections affected: 38 U.S.C. § 527, 5 U.S.C., 5 U.S.C. ch. 57, 5 U.S.C. § 3109, 38 U.S.C. § 1117, and others.
- Agencies affected: Veterans Health Administration, United States Department of Veterans Affairs, United States Congress, United States Department of Defense

Legislative history
- Introduced in the House as H.R. 4261 by Rep. Mike Coffman (R, CO-6) on March 14, 2014; Committee consideration by United States House Committee on Veterans' Affairs, United States House Veterans' Affairs Subcommittee on Health, United States House Veterans' Affairs Subcommittee on Oversight and Investigations

The Gulf War Health Research Reform Act of 2014 (H.R. 4261) is a bill that would have altered the relationship between the Research Advisory Committee on Gulf War Veterans' Illnesses (RAC) and the United States Department of Veterans Affairs (VA), the federal agency under which the RAC is constituted. The bill would have made the RAC an independent organization within the VA, required that a majority of the RAC's members be appointed by Congress instead of the VA, and authorized the RAC to release its reports without needing prior approval from the VA Secretary. The RAC is responsible for investigating Gulf War Illness (formerly known as Gulf War syndrome), a chronic multi-symptom disorder affecting returning military veterans of the 1990-91 Gulf War.

The bill was introduced into the United States House of Representatives during the 113th United States Congress. It passed the House unanimously but died in Congress when the Senate failed to take further action on it.

== Background ==
Gulf War Illness (GWI), formerly known as Gulf War Syndrome, is a chronic multi-symptom disorder affecting returning military veterans of the 1990-91 Gulf War. A wide range of acute and chronic symptoms have been linked to it, including fatigue, muscle pain, cognitive problems, rashes and diarrhea. Approximately 250,000 of the 697,000 U.S. veterans who served in the 1991 Gulf War are afflicted with enduring chronic multi-symptom illness, a condition with serious consequences. From 1995 to 2005, the health of combat veterans worsened in comparison with nondeployed veterans, with the onset of more new chronic diseases, functional impairment, repeated clinic visits and hospitalizations, chronic fatigue syndrome-like illness, posttraumatic stress disorder, and greater persistence of adverse health incidents. According to a report by the Iraq and Afghanistan Veterans of America, veterans of Iraq and Afghanistan may also suffer from the syndrome.

Some of the early potential causes considered were depleted uranium, sarin gas, smoke from burning oil wells, vaccinations, combat stress and psychological factors. The RAC concluded in 2014 and had published in the peer-reviewed scientific journal Cortex that, "exposure to pesticides and/or to PB [pyridostigmine bromide nerve agent protective pills] are causally associated with GWI and the neurological dysfunction in GW veterans. Exposure to sarin and cyclosarin and to oil well fire emissions are also associated with neurologically based health effects, though their contribution to development of the disorder known as GWI is less clear. Gene-environment interactions are likely to have contributed to development of GWI in deployed veterans. The health consequences of chemical exposures in the GW and other conflicts have been called “toxic wounds” by veterans. This type of injury requires further study and concentrated treatment research efforts that may also benefit other occupational groups with similar exposure-related illnesses."

In the year prior to the consideration of this bill, the VA and the RAC were at odds with one another. The VA replaced all but one of the members of the RAC, removed some of their supervisory tasks, tried to influence the RAC to decide that stress, rather than biology was the cause of Gulf War Illness, and told the RAC that it could not publish reports without VA permission.

The RAC was created after Congress decided that the VA's research into the issue was flawed, and focused on psychological causes, while mostly ignoring biological ones. The RAC was first authorized under the Veterans Programs Enhancement Act of 1998 (Section 104 of Public Law 105-368, enacted November 11, 1998, and now codified as 38 U.S.C. §527 note). While the law directing its creation mandated that it be established not later than January 1, 1999, the VA's significant delays resulted in the RAC's first charter not being issued until January 23, 2002, by VA Secretary Anthony Principi. The RAC convened for its first meetings on April 11-12, 2002, more than three years after the date for its establishment mandated in law.

== Provisions of the bill ==
The bill would make the Research Advisory Committee on Gulf War Illnesses (RAC) an independent committee within the VA.

The bill would require the majority of RAC members be appointed by the chairmen and ranking members of the United States House Committee on Veterans' Affairs and the United States Senate Committee on Veterans' Affairs. Three of the members would be required to be veterans, while a minimum of eight members "must be scientists of physicians, with expertise in areas like epidemiology, immunology, neurology and toxicology."

The bill would also mandate that the condition be called "Gulf War Illness" instead of "Gulf War Syndrome."

The bill also requests that the VA look at animal studies when investigating toxic exposure.

The bill states that "reports, recommendations, publications, and other documents of the (RAC) committee shall not be subject to review or approval by the Secretary of Veterans Affairs."

== Procedural history ==
H.R. 4261, the Gulf War Health Research Reform Act of 2014 was introduced into the United States House of Representatives on March 14, 2014 by Rep. Mike Coffman (R-CO-6). The bill was referred to the United States House Committee on Veterans' Affairs that same day, where it was then referred on March 24 to two subcommittees, the United States House Veterans' Affairs Subcommittee on Health and the United States House Veterans' Affairs Subcommittee on Oversight and Investigations.

The Subcommittee on Oversight and Investigations held a hearing on the bill on March 25, 2014. Rep. Jeff Miller (R-FL-01), then Chairman of the House Veterans' Affairs Committee, brought the bill to the House floor on May 28, 2014 for consideration under suspension of the rules, where it unanimously passed the House by voice vote.

The bill was then received by the Senate, where it was referred to the Senate Veterans' Affairs Committee. The Senate took no formal action on the bill, leaving it to die at the conclusion of the 113th Congress. It was not subsequently reintroduced.

== Debate and discussion ==
According to Rep. Coffman, who sponsored the bill, the legislation is the result of an investigation by the House Veterans' Affairs Subcommittee on Oversight and Investigations which determined that the VA was "exercising too much control over the Research Advisory Committee on Gulf War Illnesses (RAC)" and was "denying their ability to effectively and independently carry out its Congressionally mandated role to improve the lives of Gulf War Veterans." The investigation found the misappropriation of funds, the placement of biased members in the RAC, and restrictions on RAC reports to keep them from circulating.

Rep. Ann Kirkpatrick, who supported the bill, said that it was our job to ensure "the VA conducts objective research on chronic illnesses experienced by Gulf War veterans, in an effort to find treatments that can make a difference in their quality of life."

== See also ==
- List of bills in the 113th United States Congress
