= Khamisiyah =

Locality in Iraq

Khamisiyah الخمیسیة
- Interactive map of Khamisiyah
- Coordinates: 30°47′24″N 46°29′21″E
- Country: Iraq
- Governorate: Dhi Qar

Population
  - Total: 8,500

Khamisiyah (Arabic: الخميسية Khamisiyah) is an area in southern Iraq located approximately 350 km (217 mi) south-east of Baghdad, 200 km (124 mi) north-west of Kuwait City and 270 km (168 mi) north of Al Qaysumah. Khamisiyah is under the administration of the province of Dhi Qar. The area contains a few small towns, including Khamisiyah and Sahalat, with an estimated population of 8,500.

It is the site of the Khamisiyah Ammunition Storage Facility (also known as Tel Al Lahm Ammunition Storage Facility and Bunker 73), built and used during the regime of Saddam Hussein. The site had chemical weapons which were destroyed in 1991. The destruction of the site released a plume of sarin gas that affected thousands of US troops. This sarin exposure is the primary cause of the mass illness known as Gulf War syndrome.

== Persian Gulf War ==
The Khamisiya Ammunition Storage Facility was a site approximately 25 square km (9.65 sq mi) in area and consisted of two sections: one of 88 warehouses; the other of 100 hardened concrete bunkers surrounded by an earth berm and security fencing. The storage complex was in use by 1982.

In March 1991, combat engineers and Explosive Ordnance Disposal (EOD) teams of the U.S. Army, conducted a demolition operation. The entire storage complex, containing massive quantities of munitions, was set to be destroyed. On 4 March, all explosive charges were detonated, and witnesses stated that the resultant explosion yielded an impressive mushroom cloud. It has not been confirmed how this explosion affected Iraqi civilians in the area, if at all.

It was not known at the time, but destruction of ordnance at Khamisiya is thought to have consequently released nerve agents such as sarin and cyclosarin into the atmosphere. Computer-generated models based on atmospheric conditions project that clouds of nerve agents would have drifted south and reached allied troops. Records also show that Nuclear, Biological, Chemical (NBC) sensors monitoring the air soon reported traces of nerve agents. These NBC detection units were military units of several allied countries, including the United States, United Kingdom, and Poland.

=== Aftermath ===
It was unclear for a long time whether or not there had been chemical weapons at Khamisiya, partly because of an alternate name used by the Iraqi military (Tal al Lahm), and partly because there were other munitions storage locations in the area, including Talil Air Base and in the nearby town of An Nasiriyah. By 1996, it became clear to the Department of Defense that nerve agents were present at the Khamisiya storage facilities. In April 2002, the United States Department of Defense released two reports related to operations at Khamisiyah during the Gulf War. The first report is a final version of its case narrative U.S. Demolition Operations at Khamisiyah. The second was a technical report detailing the modeling and risk characterization of possible chemical-warfare-agent exposure in the Gulf War.

Some Gulf War veterans that were in the area have reported symptoms that meet the definitions of Gulf War Syndrome, while others report no symptoms. The U.S. Department of Defense is continuing investigations or is funding independent studies, has kept up attempts to keep track of veterans and monitor changes in personal status, as well as informing veterans and the public of any research-related progress. The United States Department of Veterans Affairs continues to treat veterans who report symptoms related to or resembling Gulf War Syndrome.

== Trivia ==
Khamisiyah is the name of a map of the video game Project Reality.

== See also ==
- Ali Air Base
- Chemical warfare
- Gulf War syndrome
- Weapon of mass destruction
