= Gayle Berry =

American politician

Member of the Colorado House of Representatives from the 55th district
- In office January 8, 1997 – January 12, 2005
- Preceded by: Dan Prinster
- Succeeded by: Bernie Buescher

Personal details
- Born: August 9, 1954 (age 71) Fruita, Colorado
- Party: Republican

Gayle Berry (born August 9, 1954) is an American politician who served in the Colorado House of Representatives from the 55th district from 1997 to 2005.
