= Trauma in the Russo-Ukrainian war =

Trauma has affected military veterans and civilian populations exposed to the Russian invasion of Ukraine.

== Background ==
In February 2022, Russia launched its invasion of Ukraine. This conflict is characterized by a situation of high-intensity warfare, which was unprecedented in Europe since the Yugoslav Wars and, more generally, since World War II, which had seen high-intensity conflicts give way to asymmetrical wars. Furthermore, both the Russian Armed Forces and the Ukrainian Armed Forces have been involved in war crimes and crimes against humanity during this war.

From the second half of 2022, mercenary forces serving the Russian army, such as the Wagner Group, began recruiting volunteers from Russian prisons in exchange for their freedom at the end of a few months of service. The prisoners who accepted these conditions were mostly individuals serving heavy sentences, thus willing to risk their lives for their freedom.

Other mental disorders were observed since the beginning of the war in Ukraine, including notably the Ulysses syndrome, a disorder mostly linked with refugees.

== Syndrome ==
Since 2014, and the beginning of the Russo-Ukrainian war, the Ukrainian syndrome has been observed. In December 2014, Ukrainian researchers including Mykhailo Matiash conducted a study on the matter and arrived at the conclusion that the Ukrainian syndrome is partly characterized by a "drastic" increase in the number of people suffering from PTSD, among other things. Time reported in 2014 that this was one of the names given by doctors to the specific psychiatric afflictions in Ukraine at the time. The syndrome was better studied since 2014, with other scholars and works being published. The syndrome was compared to the Afghan syndrome or the Vietnam syndrome:

Post-traumatic syndrome, as the experience of soldiers' participation in military conflicts in Afghanistan, Iraq, Chechnya, and Israel shows, has negative manifestations in the psyche of a warrior throughout his life, many years after the end of the war. It is also called the Afghan, Vietnamese or Chechen syndrome, depending on the name of the war the servicemen took part. Now we are talking about the Ukrainian military. The war in Ukraine gives another name to the Afghan syndrome – the Ukrainian syndrome.

The Ukrainian syndrome has been described as an adaptation to the realities of war, particularly within the youth and more broadly within the Ukrainian population. Researchers must understand this psychological adaptation in order to propose avenues for rehabilitation. In 2023, V. Ludov was part of a panel of psychologists invited to discuss the issue for the Institute of European, Russian and Eurasian Studies of the George Washington University.

During the 2022 invasion of Ukraine, as soldiers and mercenaries returned to Russia, increasingly from early 2023, crime rates in the areas where they come back witness a drastic increase. Drug consumption, rapes, and murders committed by former soldiers are on the rise in Russia. This trend is likely explained by what is referred to as the "Ukrainian syndrome," a collection of psychological, psychiatric, or pathological disorders developed by soldiers, primarily Russians, during the invasion of Ukraine.

== Droneophobia ==
Starting in 2024, intensifying drone warfare has been identified as a key factor in thousands of Ukrainian soldiers returning from the front line with acute stress disorders triggered by buzzing sounds. This phenomenon has been dubbed "droneophobia" by psychiatrists in Ukrainian military hospitals. Russia's usage of FPV drones to target Ukrainian civilians living near the front lines has spread droneophobia to the civilian population as well.

== See also ==
- Gulf War syndrome
- Post-traumatic stress disorder
- Vietnam syndrome
