= Journal of Epidemiology =

- Discipline: Medicine
- Language: English

Publication details
- History: 1991-present
- Publisher: Japan Epidemiological Association (Japan)
- Frequency: Bimonthly
- Open access: Yes
- Impact factor: 3.211 (2020)

Standard abbreviations
- ISO 4: J. Epidemiol.

Indexing
- ISSN: 0917-5040 (print); 1349-9092 (web)

Links
- Journal homepage; PubMed archive since 2005; J-STAGE online archive

The Journal of Epidemiology is a peer-reviewed open access journal for epidemiological studies. It is the official journal in English language published by the Japan Epidemiological Association. The editor-in-chief is Kota Katanoda (National Cancer Center, Tokyo, Japan). According to the Journal Citation Reports, the journal has a 2020 impact factor of 3.211.
