= Bob LeGare =

American politician

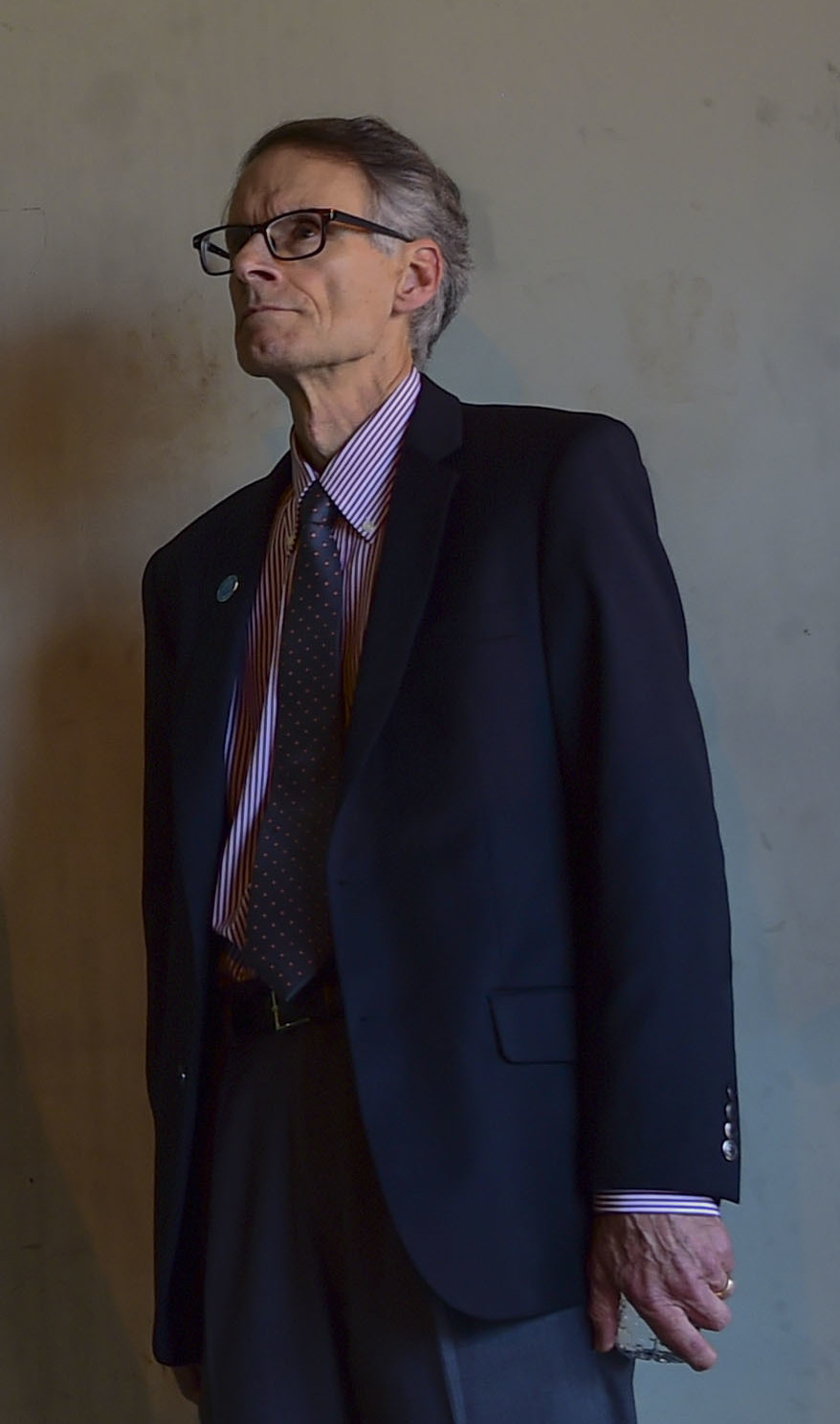
- LeGare in 2018

Mayor of Aurora, Colorado
- In office June 25, 2018 – December 2, 2019
- Preceded by: Steve Hogan
- Succeeded by: Mike Coffman

Personal details
- Born: February 3, 1956 (age 70) Villa Park, Illinois, U.S.
- Party: Independent
- Education: Community College of Aurora; University of Phoenix (BA)

Bob LeGare is an American politician who previously served as Mayor of Aurora, Colorado. Prior to being elected as mayor, he worked in real estate. He also served for 15 years on the Aurora city council. He was succeeded by Mike Coffman.

Political offices
Preceded by Steve Hogan	Mayor of Aurora, Colorado; 2018–2019	Succeeded by Mike Coffman
