= Scott Gessler =

American politician

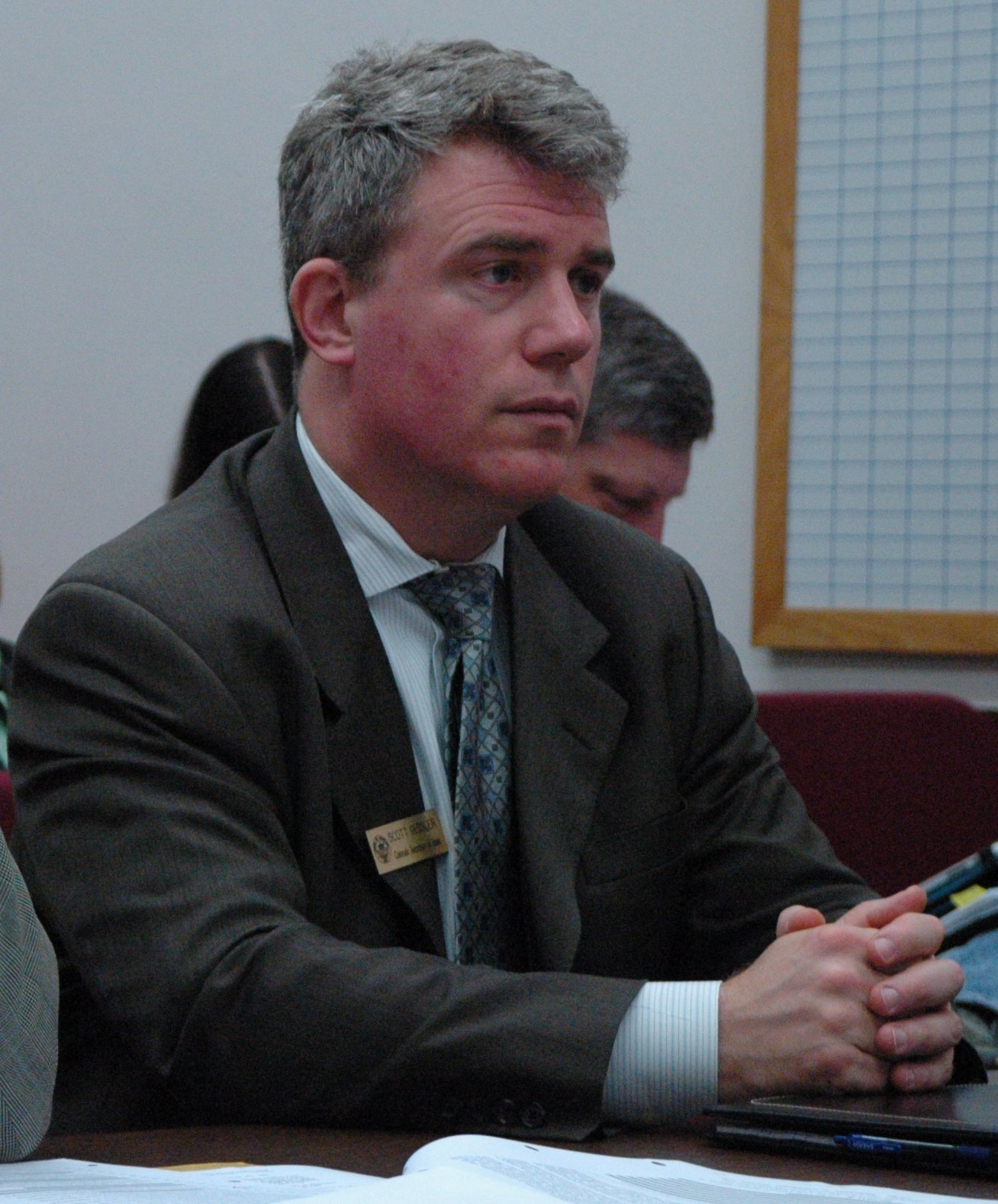

Secretary of State of Colorado
- In office January 11, 2011 – January 15, 2015
- Governor: John Hickenlooper
- Preceded by: Bernie Buescher
- Succeeded by: Wayne W. Williams

Personal details
- Born: Detroit, Michigan, U.S.
- Party: Republican
- Education: Yale University (BA); University of Michigan, Ann Arbor (JD); Northwestern University (MBA)

Scott Gessler is an American politician and the former Secretary of State of Colorado, having served from 2011 to 2015. He is a former business owner and elections attorney. Gessler is a member of the Republican Party. Gessler is also a veteran of the United States Army.

== Early life, education, and early career ==
Scott Gessler was born in Detroit, Michigan, his parents moved many times during his childhood but settled in a small suburb outside of Chicago, Illinois. He attended public schools and graduated from Riverside-Brookfield High School in 1983. After high school, Gessler attended Yale University, where he obtained his bachelor's degree, he would continue to the University of Michigan Law School where he received his Juris Doctor. Gessler later received an MBA at Northwestern University, after doing so, he began his career as a federal prosecutor for the United States Department of Justice in Washington, D.C., and served as a reservist in the United States Army for sixteen years. After Gessler briefly served overseas in the Army, he re-located to Denver, Colorado where he began working for a small law practice, where he specialized in election law. In 2002, Gessler fought against gerrymandering in Colorado House and Senate districts. In 2004, he argued the successful case before the state supreme court keeping presidential candidate Ralph Nader on the Colorado ballot.

== Personal life ==
Scott Gessler is married to his wife Kristi, together they have a daughter and a son. Currently they reside in Denver.

=== Military career ===
As a U.S. Army Reservist; his first assignment was at the 10th Military Law Center in Prince George's County, Maryland. Gessler continued his military service, joining the 12th Special Forces Group (Airborne) in Arlington Heights, Illinois. Following the deactivation of 12th Group, Scott joined the 415th Civil Affairs Battalion in Kalamazoo, Michigan. Within months that unit deployed to Bosnia, where Scott served as a Civil Affairs Officer at British Division Headquarters and later as the officer in charge of a Civil Military Cooperation Center. He remained in the Army Reserves, drilling with the 407th Civil Affairs Battalion in Arden Hills, Minnesota. He received an honorable discharge at the rank of Major.

== Political career ==
When Gessler announced his candidacy for Colorado Secretary of State in late 2009, he did not face any opposition in the Republican party primary elections. In the general election, Gessler challenged Bernie Buescher, the Democratic incumbent and Amanda Campbell, who was a member of the Constitution Party. Gessler won the election with 49.52% of the vote.

In 2011, Secretary of State Gessler filed an order requiring that Denver County not mail ballots to those who did not vote in 2010 and failed to respond to numerous mailings from the county clerks. Though counties had never mailed to these inactive voters for statewide November elections, both Pueblo and Denver, which are heavily Democratic counties, decided this would be the first time they would mail to inactive voters. This caused some to accuse Gessler of making the order for political reasons.

In the lead-up to the 2012 elections, Gessler sent letters to voters who also showed proof of non-citizenship at their recent driver's license application. The letter asked the registered voters to confirm their citizenship. Many non-citizens voluntarily removed themselves from the rolls. Although Gessler never removed or threatened to remove anyone from the voter rolls, many liberal groups complained of his efforts to purge voters. He countered the criticisms of the campaign by saying his office "had spent $1.1m registering Colorado voters, an initiative which netted more Democrats than Republicans, and that the state's electoral roll was cleaner than ever. He compared his campaign to installing fire alarms. 'Even if a building has no history of fires, it's something you do.'"

=== Ethics investigation ===
An investigation and hearing conducted by the Colorado Independent Ethics Commission resulted in a unanimous 5–0 vote finding that Gessler violated the state discretionary fund statute by spending roughly $2000 in government money on travel surrounding a political event, the Republican National Lawyers Association meeting in Sarasota, Florida, in August 2012.

Gessler appealed the findings in court; however, a Denver District Court judge ruled in favor of the Commission and ultimately found Gessler guilty. Gessler appealed again claiming the Commission had no jurisdiction. This was easy to do since the State of Colorado would ultimately pay the fees of both lawyers which eventually totaled over $515,000. He lost again and this time appealed to the United States Supreme Court, which refused to hear his appeal. He finally paid the State of Colorado the fine plus fees of $1,514.88.

Colorado Secretary of State election, 2010
Party	Candidate	Votes	%
Republican	Scott Gessler	852,818	49.52
Democratic	Bernie Buescher	755,522	43.87
Constitution	Amanda Campbell	113,756	6.61
Total votes		1,722,096	100

=== Governor's race ===
In 2013 Gessler announced he would seek the Republican nomination for Governor of Colorado. For much of the campaign Gessler was considered the front-runner being endorsed by Congressman Bob Schaffer, State Senator George Rivera, State Representatives Clarice Navarro, Lois Landgraf, and over fifty County Commissioners, Sheriffs, Mayors and City Councilors. In March 2014, Gessler won the Colorado Republican Caucus Straw poll with 31% of the vote, compared to Bob Beauprez's 22% and Tom Tancredo's 15% of the vote. As the race continued Bob Beauprez poured hundreds of thousands of dollars from his personal fortune into his campaign and emerged the winner of the primary election. Gessler immediately endorsed Bob Beauprez in the general election and embarked on a statewide tour to convince his supporters to vote for Beauprez. Gessler hired RedRock Strategies and Rory McShane to oversee the campaign.

=== Donald Trump 2020 campaign ===
Gessler was an attorney on Donald Trump's 2020 re-election campaign. During the campaign, he suggested that the 2020 elections were stolen by Democrats and falsely claimed there was election fraud.

=== Chair of Colorado Republican Party race ===
Gessler ran for chair of the Colorado Republican Party in 2021. During the campaign, he falsely suggested that the 2020 elections were stolen by Democrats and falsely claimed there was election fraud.

Political offices
Preceded by Bernie Buescher	Secretary of State of Colorado; 2011–2015	Succeeded by Wayne W. Williams
