= Bernie Buescher =

American politician (born 1949)

Secretary of State of Colorado
- In office January 14, 2009 – January 14, 2011
- Governor: Bill Ritter
- Preceded by: Mike Coffman
- Succeeded by: Scott Gessler

Member of the Colorado House of Representatives from the 55th district
- In office January 12, 2005 – January 7, 2009
- Preceded by: Gayle Berry
- Succeeded by: Laura Bradford

Personal details
- Born: July 11, 1949 (age 77) Grand Junction, Colorado, U.S.
- Party: Democratic
- Spouse: Mary Beth Buescher
- Education: University of Notre Dame; University of Colorado
- Profession: Lawyer

Bernie Buescher (born July 11, 1949) is an American politician who served as secretary of state of Colorado. A Democrat, he was appointed to the office in 2009 by Governor of Colorado Bill Ritter to fill the vacancy left by the resignation of Republican Mike Coffman.

== Early life ==
Buescher was born in Grand Junction, Colorado. He attended the University of Notre Dame, graduating with an accounting degree. He received his J.D from the University of Colorado in 1974.

== Career ==
After law school, Buescher returned to Grand Junction and joined the law firm of Williams, Turner and Holmes, where he practiced corporate law until 1987; that year he became president and CEO of West Star Aviation.

In 1996, Governor Roy Romer asked Buescher to serve as interim manager for the Colorado State Fair. Romer then appointed Buescher as executive director of the Colorado Department of Health Care Policy and Financing in 1997. Buescher resigned in 1998.

== Politics ==
In the 1998 Colorado gubernatorial election, Buescher was the Democratic candidate for lieutenant governor, running alongside Gail Schoettler, the candidate for governor. The candidacy was unsuccessful.

In 2004 Buescher was elected to represent the 55th district in the Colorado House of Representatives. He was re-elected in 2006. He ran again in 2008 but was defeated by Republican Laura Bradford. In the legislature, Buescher was appointed to the Joint Budget Committee by Speaker Andrew Romanoff; he served as chair of the Joint Budget Committee in 2006 and 2008, and also chaired the House Appropriations Committee in 2007 and 2008.

In 2009, Buescher was appointed by Governor Bill Ritter to serve as Colorado Secretary of State.

Buescher ran for secretary of state in 2010 but was unsuccessful, losing to Scott Gessler. Shortly after the election, Buescher was asked by John Suthers, the Republican attorney general, to serve as deputy attorney general. Buescher served in this position until September 2014.

In December 2015, Buescher joined the firm of Ireland Stapleton Pryor and Pascoe. His practice involves regulatory matters related to health care, energy and elections.

Buescher has served on non-profit boards, including the Ara Parseghian Medical Research Foundation, the Governor's Residence Preservation Fund, the Colorado Children's Campaign, Bright by Three, St. Mary's Hospital, the Colorado Health and Hospital Association and the Colorado Youth Conservation Corps.

Colorado Governor Jared Polis appointed Buescher to the State Board of Equalization in 2022. However, in January 2024, Polis fired Buescher from the board and replaced him with a Republican designee. The firing came after Buescher voted with the board to reverse a tax break granted to property owners in Douglas County, Colorado enacted by the county's board of commissioners.

== See also ==
- Bibliography of Colorado
- Geography of Colorado
- History of Colorado
- Index of Colorado-related articles
- List of Colorado-related lists
- Outline of Colorado

== Notes ==
Political offices
Preceded by Mike Coffman	Secretary of State of Colorado; 2009–2011	Succeeded by Scott Gessler
