= Mike Coffman =

American politician (born 1955)

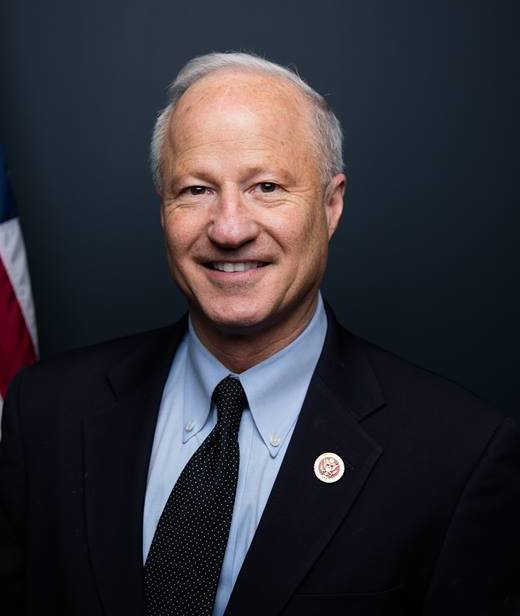

Mayor of Aurora
- Incumbent
- Assumed office December 2, 2019
- Preceded by: Bob LeGare

Member of the U.S. House of Representatives from Colorado's 6th district
- In office January 3, 2009 – January 3, 2019
- Preceded by: Tom Tancredo
- Succeeded by: Jason Crow

35th Secretary of State of Colorado
- In office January 9, 2007 – January 3, 2009
- Governor: Bill Ritter
- Preceded by: Gigi Dennis
- Succeeded by: Bernie Buescher

Treasurer of Colorado
- In office March 27, 2006 – January 9, 2007
- Governor: Bill Owens
- Preceded by: Mark Hillman (acting)
- Succeeded by: Cary Kennedy
- In office January 3, 1999 – June 9, 2005
- Governor: Bill Owens
- Preceded by: Bill Owens
- Succeeded by: Mark Hillman (acting)

Member of the Colorado Senate from the 27th district
- In office December 12, 1994 – January 3, 1999
- Preceded by: Bill Owens
- Succeeded by: John Andrews

Member of the Colorado House of Representatives from the 40th district
- In office January 1993 – December 12, 1994
- Preceded by: Jeanne Adkins
- Succeeded by: Gary McPherson

Member of the Colorado House of Representatives from the 49th district
- In office January 1989 – January 1993
- Preceded by: Bill Owens
- Succeeded by: William Jerke

Personal details
- Born: Michael Harold Coffman; March 19, 1955 (age 71) Fort Leonard Wood, Missouri, U.S.
- Party: Republican
- Spouse: Cynthia Honssinger (m. 2005; div. 2017)
- Education: University of Colorado Boulder (BA)

Military service
- Branch/service: United States Army; United States Army Reserve; United States Marine Corps; United States Marine Corps Reserve
- Years of service: 1972–1978 (Army); 1979–1994, 2005–2006 (Marines)
- Rank: Major
- Battles/wars: Persian Gulf War; Iraq War
- Coffman's voice Coffman supporting a bill to extend the Veterans Choice program. Recorded April 5, 2017

Michael Harold Coffman (born March 19, 1955) is an American politician, businessman, and veteran of the U.S. Army and U.S. Marine Corps serving as the mayor of Aurora, Colorado, since 2019. A Republican, Coffman served as the U.S. representative for Colorado's 6th congressional district for five terms, as well as Colorado secretary of state and Colorado state treasurer.

The son of a soldier, Coffman was born in Missouri and moved to Aurora when he was nine years old. He enlisted in the army himself at age 17, serving two years before leaving for the reserves to attend college. Coffman received his B.A. from the University of Colorado Boulder, while also attending special programs at Harvard University and the University of Veracruz. After transferring to the Marine Corps Reserve, Coffman founded a property management company in Aurora in 1983. As a soldier, Coffman served in both the Gulf War and the Iraq War.

Coffman was first elected to the Colorado House of Representatives in 1988, being reelected in 1990 prior to his appointment to the State Senate in December 1994. He was then elected as Colorado State Treasurer in 1998 and as Colorado Secretary of State in 2006. He resigned as Secretary of State when he was elected to the United States Congress, where he served until his defeat for reelection by Jason Crow in 2018. In 2019, he was elected to his current post as Mayor of Aurora, and was re-elected to a second term in the 2023 election.

== Early life, education, and career ==
Michael Coffman was born on March 19, 1955, at Fort Leonard Wood, Missouri, to Harold and Dorothy Coffman, and is one of five children. His father served in the United States Army at Fort Leonard Wood, and after 1964, at Fitzsimons Army Medical Center in Aurora.

In 1972, Coffman enlisted in the U.S. Army, and was assigned to a mechanized infantry battalion. The following year, he earned a high school diploma through an army program. Leaving active duty for the U.S. Army Reserve in 1974, he entered the University of Colorado, under the G.I. Bill graduating in 1979 with a bachelor's degree in political science. In 1994, he attended the Senior Executive Program at the Harvard Kennedy School. and the University of Veracruz in Mexico. Upon graduation from the University of Colorado, Coffman transferred from the Army Reserve to the United States Marine Corps in 1979, becoming an infantry officer. In 1983, he transferred from active duty to the Marine Reserve, serving until 1994. In 1983, he created an Aurora-based property management firm, serving as senior shareholder until 2000.

== State politics and military deployments ==
=== Colorado Legislature ===
Coffman began his political career serving as a member of the Colorado House of Representatives from 1989 to 1994. Shortly after winning re-election in 1990, he took an unpaid leave of absence from the statehouse during his active duty service in the Persian Gulf War, during which time he saw combat as a light armored infantry officer. He was awarded the Combat Action Ribbon after his first deployment. In 1994, he retired from the U.S. Marine Corps after 20 years of combined service in the Army, Army Reserve, Marines, and Marine Reserve. In 2006, Coffman returned to active duty in the Marines where he deployed to Iraq for combat service. Upon return from his deployment, he retired from the Marine Corps once again after a total of 22 years of military service. When State Senator Bill Owens resigned his seat to become state treasurer, the party's vacancy committee named Coffman as the replacement in December 1994. In 1996, he was elected unopposed to a full term to the Colorado State Senate. He became the chairman of the Finance Committee.

=== Colorado Treasurer ===
In 1998, Coffman was elected as State Treasurer of Colorado with 51% of the vote, defeating Democratic nominee Jim Polsfut. In 2002, he was re-elected with 56%, defeating Democratic State Senator Terry Phillips.

He resigned from that post in 2005 in order to resume his career in the U.S. Marines, and serve in the War in Iraq, where he helped support the Independent Electoral Commission of Iraq, which oversaw two national elections, and helped establish interim local governments in the western Euphrates Valley. In 2006, he completed his duty in Iraq and was re-appointed as State Treasurer. He served that position for only a few months because in November 2006, he was elected Colorado Secretary of State with 51% of the vote, defeating Democratic State Senator and Minority Leader Ken Gordon.

=== Colorado Secretary of State ===
During the general election of 2008, when Coffman was Secretary of State of Colorado, several groups accused the secretary of state's office of improperly marking 6,400 voter registration forms as incomplete, because they failed to check a box on the form, required by legislation sponsored by then Senate Majority Leader Ken Gordon in 2006. Coffman's office responded that incomplete registrations require voters to either re-register or provide extra identification when they go to vote. Soon after the accusations were made, Common Cause filed suit against Coffman, in his official capacity as secretary of state. The secretary of state's office denied wrongdoing, and Coffman said he believes his office was correctly applying the law. On October 30, 2008, the court approved a preliminary injunction allowing purged voters to participate in the 2008 election. Bernie Buescher, Coffman's successor as secretary of state, replaced Coffman as defendant in the case in January 2009.

== U.S. House of Representatives ==
=== Elections ===
==== 2008 ====
Coffman announced that he would run for the U.S. House seat being vacated by retiring Republican Tom Tancredo in 2008 in Colorado's 6th congressional district. Three other candidates decided to run in the Republican primary for the open seat: Wil Armstrong (son of former U.S. Senator Bill Armstrong), State Senator Ted Harvey, and State Senator Steve Ward. Coffman won the August primary with a plurality of 40% of the vote, beating runner-up Wil Armstrong by seven points.

The Denver Post endorsed Coffman on October 10, 2008. In November, Coffman defeated Democrat Hank Eng, an Appleton, Wisconsin City Common Councilman, 61%–39%. Governor Bill Ritter designated State Representative Bernie Buescher, a Democrat, to succeed Coffman as Secretary of State.

==== 2010 ====
Coffman defeated Democrat John Flerlage 66%–31%.

==== 2012 ====
In redistricting, Colorado's 6th congressional district was made more favorable to Democrats than in previous elections since Aurora was added to the district. Democratic State Representative Joe Miklosi challenged Coffman. Coffman defeated Miklosi 48%–46%, a difference of 6,992 votes.

==== 2014 ====
Coffman ran for re-election to the U.S. House in 2014. He won the Republican nomination in the primary election on June 24, 2014, unopposed. He faced Democrat Andrew Romanoff in the general election. Coffman won 52%–43%.

==== 2016 ====
Coffman ran for re-election in 2016 as the Republican nominee against Democratic State Senator Morgan Carroll. He defeated Carroll in the general election, winning 51% of the vote to Carroll's 42%. In July 2016, the conservative advocacy group Americans for Prosperity announced plans to launch a major advertising campaign opposing Carroll.

Coffman subsequently held a public town hall meeting the following April, where he was challenged and often shouted down by residents of his district and others in attendance. Coffman's performance at the town hall and frank discussion with the audience earned praise from KUSA commentator Kyle Clark, who remarked that "[Coffman's] opponents might not like me saying this, but he is clearly prepared to debate the issues, his positions, and his policies." Coffman also made national news during the town hall, telling the audience that White House Press Secretary Sean Spicer "needs to go" because of his historically inaccurate remarks about the Holocaust.

==== 2018 ====
Coffman's 2018 Democratic opponent was Jason Crow, an attorney and Iraq War veteran, who beat Levi Tillemann in the primary by a 66 to 34 margin.

On July 2, 2018, the New York Times ran an article about the fact that a district populated by Somalis, Japanese, Koreans, Latinos, and other minorities has continued to be "a scene of frustration and failure for Democrats, who in a series of expensive elections had been unable to unseat Mike Coffman." The Times explained that Coffman had "kept winning in part because he has sought to show he embraced the needs of his newer constituents," and had become "a renegade Republican on immigration issues."

Coffman was trailing Crow in most of the polls in fall of 2018. The Republican National Congressional Committee confirmed on October 19, 2018, that it had pulled the remaining $1 million in television ad spending in an apparent assessment that Coffman was likely to lose.

In the November 2018 general election, Crow defeated Coffman 54.1% to 42.9%.

At a press conference the day after the election, President Donald Trump blamed Coffman for the loss of his seat, as Coffman had distanced himself from the president. Trump said, "On the other hand, you had some who decided to, 'Let's stay away, let's stay away.' They did very poorly. I'm not sure whether I should be happy or sad but I feel just fine about it ... Mike Coffman. Too bad, Mike."

=== Committee assignments ===
- Committee on Armed Services
  - Subcommittee on Military Personnel
  - Subcommittee on Oversight and Investigations
  - Subcommittee on Seapower and Projection Forces
- Committee on Veterans' Affairs
  - Subcommittee on Economic Opportunity
  - Subcommittee on Oversight and Investigations
  - Subcommittee on Technology Modernization

=== Caucus memberships ===
- Congressional Balanced Budget Amendment Caucus (Chairman)
- Congressional Bike Caucus
- Congressional Caucus on Turkey and Turkish Americans
- Congressional Coal Caucus
- United States Congressional International Conservation Caucus
- Natural Gas Caucus
- Sportsmen's Caucus
- Climate Solutions Caucus
- Republican Main Street Partnership
- Congressional Arts Caucus
- Congressional NextGen 9-1-1 Caucus
- Congressional Western Caucus
- Problem Solvers Caucus

== Mayor of Aurora, Colorado ==
Coffman was defeated for re-election to Congress to Colorado's 6th congressional district by Democrat Jason Crow in 2018. After leaving Congress, Coffman announced his candidacy for mayor of Aurora in 2019. He was elected mayor in November. He took office on December 2, 2019.

He was re-elected in 2023.

== Political positions ==
For the 114th Congress, Coffman was ranked as the 25th most bipartisan member of the U.S. House of Representatives (and the most bipartisan member of the U.S. House of Representatives from Colorado) in the Bipartisan Index created by The Lugar Center and the McCourt School. As of September 2018, Coffman had voted with his party in 91.8% of votes in the 115th United States Congress.

=== Vote Smart Political Courage Test ===
According to Vote Smart's 2016 analysis, Coffman generally supports anti-abortion legislation, opposes an income tax increase, opposes federal spending and supports lowering taxes as a means of promoting economic growth, opposes requiring states to adopt federal education standards, supports building the Keystone Pipeline, supports government funding for the development of renewable energy, opposes the federal regulation of greenhouse gas emissions, opposes gun control legislation, supports repealing the Affordable Care Act, opposes same-sex marriage, and supports requiring immigrants who are unlawfully present to return to their country of origin before they are eligible for citizenship.

=== Social issues ===
In early 2014, Coffman announced that he no longer supported personhood laws.

Coffman supports the Supreme Court's decision in Burwell v. Hobby Lobby Stores, Inc., allowing closely held for-profit corporations to be exempt from a regulation its owners religiously object to, but supports maintaining access to birth control for women.

Coffman supports nationwide reciprocity of concealed weapons permits and opposes universal background checks for gun purchases. He supported the 2012 renewal of the Violence Against Women Act.

In 2014, Coffman co-sponsored the Employment Non-Discrimination Act, which prohibits discrimination in hiring and employment on the basis of sexual orientation or gender identity. In 2016, Coffman initially supported but ultimately opposed an amendment to the National Defense Authorization Act which would provide protections and exemptions to "any religious corporation, religious association, religious educational institution, or religious society" that receives a federal defense contract.

=== Drug laws ===
Coffman had a "B+" grade from marijuana legalization group National Organization for the Reform of Marijuana Laws (NORML) regarding his voting record on cannabis-related matters. He supports allowing veterans access to medical marijuana, if legal in their state, per their Veterans Health Administration doctor's recommendation. He also supports allowing cannabis businesses access to banking, medical marijuana research, and industrial hemp farming.

In January 2018, Coffman joined other Colorado congressman in criticizing a memo by Attorney General Jeff Sessions announcing his intention to rescind the Obama-era practice of allowing states to make marijuana use legal. Coffman suggested that the memo violated the constitution's commerce clause. “The decision that was made to legalize marijuana in Colorado was made by the voters of Colorado and only applies within the boundaries of our state,” he said. “Colorado had every right to legalize marijuana and I will do everything I can do protect that right against the power of an overreaching federal government.”

=== Donald Trump ===
Coffman did not endorse Donald Trump, the Republican Party's nominee for U.S. president in 2016. In August 2016, he ran an advertisement promising to "stand up" to Trump. The ad represented the first time a House Republican used explicitly anti-Trump messaging in paid advertising. Coffman also released a version of the commercial which featured him speaking Spanish. He criticized Trump for his attacks on the parents of Captain Humayun Khan.

In February 2017, he voted against a resolution that would have directed the House to request ten years of Trump's tax returns, which would then have been reviewed by the House Ways and Means Committee in a closed session.

In April 2017, Coffman told a town hall crowd he would support legislation that requires the president, vice president, members of Congress, and all those seeking federal office to publicly release their tax returns prior to an election.

Coffman called for the firing of White House National Security Adviser Michael Flynn over interactions Flynn had with Russian officials. After Flynn was fired, Coffman said "I want to see that transcript to see if there are other conversations that he had is worthwhile finding out, but I also think it's important to move on."

As of September 2018, FiveThirtyEight found that Coffman had voted with President Trump's position 96% of the time, and was the fifth-most partisan Trump supporter in the House when compared to his district's voting patterns.

=== Birther conspiracy theories ===
In May 2012, Coffman stated that he did not know where President Barack Obama was born. Coffman went on to say of Obama that "in his heart, he's not an American. He's just not an American." Coffman issued an apology several days later, saying that he had misspoken and that he had confidence in President Obama's citizenship and legitimacy as president. In a Denver Post op-ed later that month, Coffman described his comment as "inappropriate and boneheaded."

=== Economic issues ===
Coffman voted against the American Recovery and Reinvestment Act of 2009, which was a stimulus package intended to save and create jobs, and provide temporary relief programs as a response to the Great Recession. Coffman cited a nonexistent Congressional Budget Office study to justify his vote against the stimulus package. Coffman later claimed that "the Congressional Budget Office estimates have been changed or suppressed".

He voted in support of the Tax Cuts and Jobs Act of 2017. Regarding his vote, Coffman says "I think the economy is going to perform a lot better." He maintained that individuals would benefit greatly from the change in tax brackets and that corporate tax cuts are "essential to making them globally competitive."

=== Gun rights ===
In 2017, he voted for a bill that would require states to accept concealed-carry permits from other, less-regulated states. He also supported a bill that would reverse an Obama administration rule confiscating guns from people unable to manage their Social Security benefits. At a February 2018 town hall, Coffman said he would consider “reasonable restrictions” on gun rights “within the parameters of the Second Amendment.” He said he would not support an assault-weapons ban, but would allow the temporary confiscation of firearms from persons who represented a threat to themselves or others.

=== Healthcare ===
Coffman is in favor of a "full repeal" of the Affordable Care Act (Obamacare). In January 2017, he voted in support of legislation that began the process of repealing the Affordable Care Act (ACA). In May 2017, Coffman voted against the American Health Care Act of 2017, a Republican bill which would have partially repealed the ACA.

=== Military and veterans affairs ===
In 2011, Coffman proposed a half billion dollars in cuts to military programs such as education reimbursements, the Selective Service and the military's health plan, TRICARE, saying that the programs "have been neglected for a long time. Every dollar wasted is a dollar not going to our war fighters. What they do is important to this country, and we should focus on them."

Coffman introduced the Veterans Paralympic Act of 2013, which funds disabled veterans who want to compete in the Paralympic Games. The bill was signed into law by President Obama in 2013. In response to a 2013 Gazette report about veterans with mental health conditions, such as post-traumatic stress disorder, being stripped of medical benefits, Coffman sponsored a 2014 amendment that would allow servicemen with mental health issues who were discharged because of misconduct to appeal for medical discharge instead.

Coffman introduced the Gulf War Health Research Reform Act of 2014, a bill that would alter the relationship between the Research Advisory Committee on Gulf War Illnesses (RAC) and the United States Department of Veterans Affairs (VA). Coffman was the first congressman to call for Secretary of Veterans Affairs Eric Shinseki to resign after misconduct at multiple VA facilities was revealed. On May 30, 2014, Shinseki resigned as secretary. In 2016, Coffman co-sponsored a bill to abolish the Selective Service System.

In December 2017, Coffman and Elizabeth Esty (D-CT) introduced H.R. 4635 to “direct the Secretary of Veterans Affairs to increase the number of peer-to-peer counselors providing counseling for women veterans.”

In March 2018, Coffman called on President Trump to fire VA Secretary David Shulkin over his travel expenses and other issues. Coffman wrote the president that Shulkin “lacks the moral authority to achieve your goals of a transparent, accountable VA that is dedicated to meeting our nation's obligations to the men and women who wore the uniform and made tremendous sacrifices in defense of our freedoms.”

=== Net neutrality ===
In July 2018, Coffman supported a congressional bill to reinstate net neutrality rules.

=== Immigration ===
In August 2014, Coffman broke ranks with the Republican Party and voted against a bill that would have dismantled the Deferred Action for Childhood Arrivals program. In October 2015, Coffman and Democrat Tammy Duckworth co-sponsored the Military Enlistment Opportunity Act, which would provide undocumented immigrant children an opportunity to serve in the U.S. military and gain a path to citizenship.

Coffman opposed President Donald Trump's 2017 executive order to impose a temporary ban on entry to the U.S. to citizens of seven Muslim-majority countries, stating: "While I've supported heightened vetting procedures, I have never, nor will I ever support a blanket travel ban, for people solely based on ethnic or religious grounds."

In 2017, Coffman petitioned the House to pass a law protecting DREAMers. In September of that year, however, Representative Bob Goodlatte chairman of the House Judiciary Committee, said he would not act on any such legislation before addressing criminal foreign gangs and border security. Coffman then withdrew his petition, saying, “'With all the other things going on right now, it's kind of put on the back burner.” He said, though, that he would sign a Democratic petition to force a vote on the DREAM Act.

In June 2018, Coffman said the Trump administration was “heading in the wrong direction” on immigration owing to Stephen Miller's role as a presidential advisor. Coffman said that Trump should fire Miller, whom he described as “completely tone deaf when it comes to reforming our immigration system.”

Also in June 2018, he talked to NPR about the separation of illegal immigrants from their children, saying that the White House should “appoint one person solely focused on the reunification issue of these families.” He said he had visited a detention center for children, and found the conditions there to be “pretty good.”

=== Voting rights ===
In September 2016, Coffman co-sponsored the Voting Rights Amendment Act of 2015, which would restore some protections in the 1965 Voting Rights Act that had been removed by the United States Supreme Court.

== Electoral history ==
Colorado's 6th congressional district election, 2008
Party	Candidate	Votes	%
Republican	Mike Coffman	250,877	60.66
Democratic	Hank Eng	162,641	39.33
Valid ballots		413,518	93.97
Invalid or blank votes		26,527	6.03
Total votes		440,045	100.00
Turnout			95.70
Republican hold			

Colorado's 6th congressional district election, 2010
Party	Candidate	Votes	%
Republican	Mike Coffman (incumbent)	217,368	65.68
Democratic	John Flerlage	104,104	31.46
Libertarian	Rob McNealy	9,466	2.86
Write-ins		5	0.00
Total votes		330,943	100.00
Republican hold			

Republican primary results
Party	Candidate	Votes	%
Republican	Mike Coffman (incumbent)	35,271	100.0
Total votes		35,271	100.0

Colorado's 6th congressional district, 2012
Party	Candidate	Votes	%
Republican	Mike Coffman (incumbent)	163,938	47.8
Democratic	Joe Miklosi	156,937	45.8
Independent	Kathy Polhemus	13,442	3.9
Libertarian	Patrick E. Provost	8,597	2.5
Total votes		342,914	100.0
Republican hold			

Republican primary results
Party	Candidate	Votes	%
Republican	Mike Coffman (incumbent)	43,737	100.0

Colorado's 6th congressional district, 2014
Party	Candidate	Votes	%
Republican	Mike Coffman (incumbent)	143,467	51.9
Democratic	Andrew Romanoff	118,847	43.0
Libertarian	Norm Olsen	8,623	3.1
Green	Gary Swing	5,503	2.0
Total votes		276,440	100.0
Republican hold			

Republican primary results
Party	Candidate	Votes	%
Republican	Mike Coffman (incumbent)	41,288	100.0
Total votes		41,288	100.0

Colorado's 6th congressional district, 2016
Party	Candidate	Votes	%
Republican	Mike Coffman (incumbent)	191,626	50.9
Democratic	Morgan Carroll	160,372	42.6
Libertarian	Norm Olsen	18,778	5.0
Green	Robert Lee Worthey	5,641	1.5
Total votes		376,417	100.0
Republican hold			

Republican primary results, Colorado 2018
Party	Candidate	Votes	%
Republican	Mike Coffman (incumbent)	56,703	100%
Total votes		56,703	100%

Colorado's 6th congressional district results, 2018
Party	Candidate	Votes	%
Democratic	Jason Crow	187,639	54.10%
Republican	Mike Coffman (incumbent)	148,685	42.87%
Libertarian	Kat Martin	5,886	1.70%
Independent	Dan Chapin	4,607	1.33%
Write-in		5	<0.01%
Total votes		346,822	100%
Democratic gain from Republican			

Aurora, Colorado mayoral election, 2019
Candidate	Votes	%
Mike Coffman	26,690	35.7
Omar Montgomery	26,475	35.4
Ryan Frazier	12,063	16.1
Marsha Berzins	8,015	10.7
Rennie Peterson	1,368	1.8
Write-ins	19	0.0
Total votes	74,630	

== Personal life ==
Coffman was married to former Colorado Attorney General Cynthia Coffman. They filed for divorce in June 2017.

Coffman is a United Methodist.

Political offices
Preceded by Bill Owens	Treasurer of Colorado; 1999–2005	Succeeded by Mark Hillman; Acting
Preceded by Mark Hillman; Acting	Treasurer of Colorado; 2006–2007	Succeeded by Cary Kennedy
Preceded by Gigi Dennis	Secretary of State of Colorado; 2007–2009	Succeeded by Bernie Buescher
Preceded by Bob LeGare	Mayor of Aurora; 2019–present	Incumbent
U.S. House of Representatives
Preceded by Tom Tancredo	Member of the U.S. House of Representatives from Colorado's 6th congressional district 2009–2019	Succeeded by Jason Crow
U.S. order of precedence (ceremonial)
Preceded by Tom Tancredo as Former U.S. Representative	Order of precedence of the United States as Former U.S. Representative	Succeeded by Scott Tipton as Former U.S. Representative
