= Paul Tauer =

American politician (1935–2022)

Paul Tauer (1935–2022) was an American politician who served as the mayor of Aurora, Colorado. He was a member of the Republican Party. His son, Ed Tauer, also served as the mayor of Aurora until November 2011, when he left office due to term limits.

== Elected office ==
Tauer was first elected to serve on the Aurora city council in 1979 and served until 1987, when he was elected mayor. He served as Aurora mayor from 1987 until 2003, when he was term limited. Tauer is noted for playing a major role in the development of Denver International Airport and for bringing the University of Colorado Health Sciences Center (now known as the Anschutz Medical Campus) from Denver to the site of the former Fitzsimons Army Medical Center in Aurora.

== Death ==
Local media outlets in the Denver area first reported Tauer's death on August 26, 2022, without giving an exact date of death.
