= Secretary of State of Colorado =

- Executive Seal

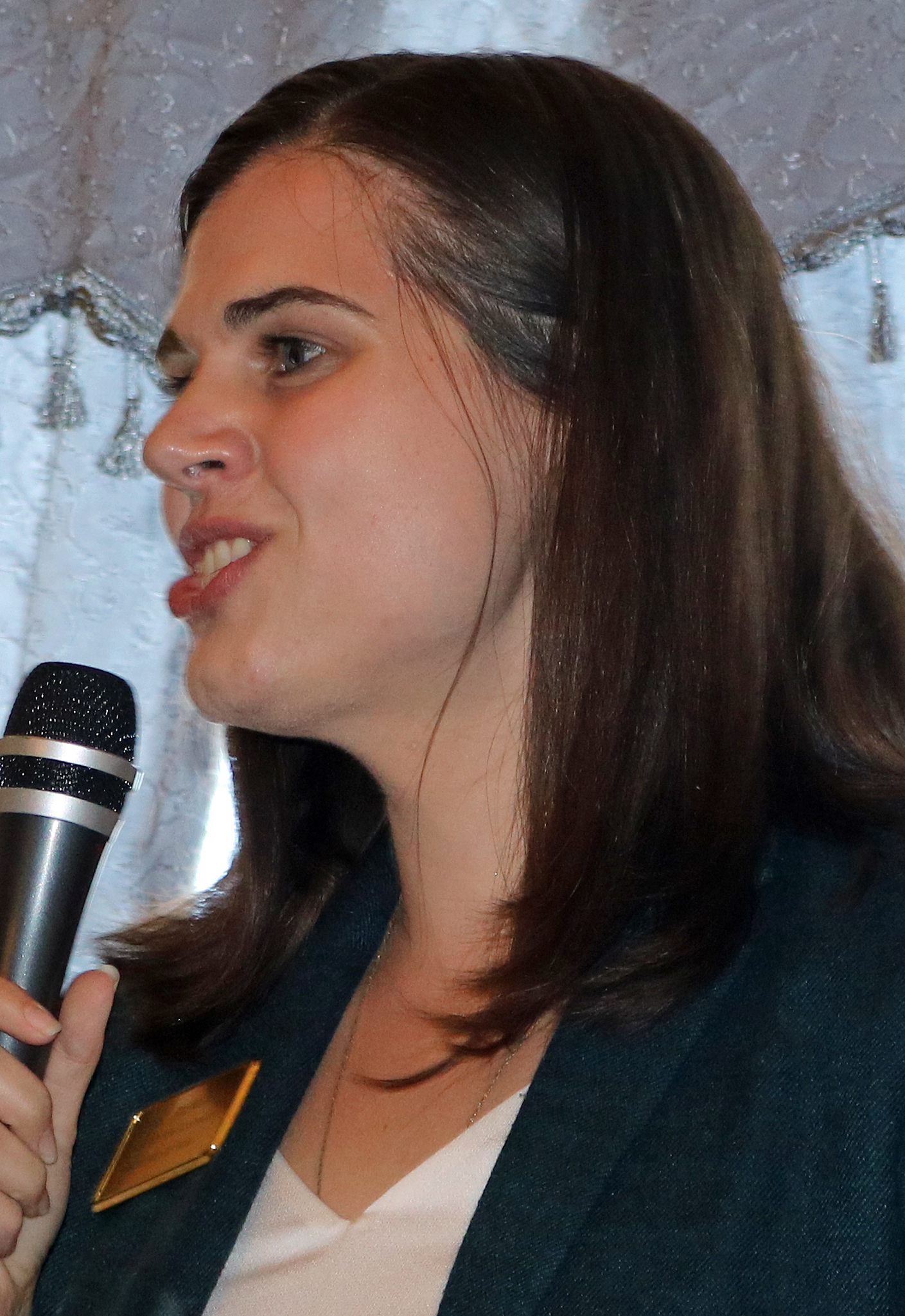
- Incumbent; Jena Griswold since January 8, 2019
- Colorado Department of State
- Constituting instrument: Colorado Constitution
- Formation: June 6, 1861
- First holder: Lewis Weld
- Website: www.sos.state.co.us

The Secretary of State of Colorado is the secretary of state of the state of Colorado in the United States. The office is one of four elected constitutional offices in the state. The current secretary of state is Democrat Jena Griswold.

== Structure ==
The Secretary of State heads the Colorado Department of State, a principal department of the Colorado state government, which is composed of four divisions:

- Business & Licensing Division: Files documents for certain business organizations and business names; files trade names for certain business entities; registers trademarks, and files financing statements and notices of security interests in agricultural products pursuant to the Uniform Commercial Code, federal tax liens; and other miscellaneous statutory liens; performs searches of those records; provides copies of filed documents; issues related certificates; and provides pertinent educational services. Issues bingo/raffle licenses and inspects facilities and operations of these games to ensure compliance with bingo/raffle laws; commissions and regulates notaries public; registers charitable organizations that solicit contributions in Colorado and their professional fundraisers; publishes the Colorado administrative rules code and register, and provides rulemaking guidance for state agencies.
- Elections Division: Supervises elections, maintains the statewide voter registration file, verifies initiative petition signatures, and administers the campaign finance laws; and serves as the filing office for unincorporated communities and for conflict of interest disclosure statements.
- Administration Division: Provides management and central support services for the Department of State such as budgeting, accounting, and human resources; monitors the use of the state seal, certifies the interest rate on appealed money judgments, files acts passed by the General Assembly, and conveys information within the office to the public; plans and monitors legislation that affects the Department of State; responds to inquiries from the press and public; licenses entities that circulate petitions; and registers lobbyists.
- Information Technology Division: Supports the information systems needs of the entire secretary of state's office. Maintains the departmental infrastructure consisting of multiple servers, personal computers, networking equipment, firewall, telephony, peripherals, and other information technology equipment to support the data and imaging needs of the department. Also supports the web presence of the secretary of state.

== Secretaries of the Territory of Colorado ==
Image	Name	Term	Party
	Lewis Ledyard Weld	1861	Republican
	Samuel Hitt Elbert	1862-1866	Republican
	Frank Hall	1866–1874	Republican
	John W. Jenkins	1874–1875	Republican
	John Taffe	1875–1876	Republican

== Secretaries of the State of Colorado ==
Image	Name	Term	Party
	William Clark	1876–1879	Republican
	Norman H. Meldrum	1879–1883	Republican
	Melvin Edwards	1883–1887	Republican
	James Rice	1887–1891	Republican
	Edward J. Eaton	1891–1893	Republican
	Nelson O. McCless	1893–1895	Populist
	Albert B. McGaffey	1895–1897	Republican
	Charles H.S. Whipple	1897–1899	Democratic
	Elmer F. Beckwith	1899–1901	Democratic
	David A. Mills	1901–1903	Democratic
	James Cowie	1903–1907	Republican
	Timothy O'Connor	1907–1909	Republican
	James B. Pearce	1909–1915	Democratic
	John E. Ramer	1915–1917	Republican
	James R. Noland	1917–1921	Democratic
	Carl Miliken	1921–1927	Republican
	Charles Armstrong	1927–1935	Republican
	James Carr	1935–1935	Democratic
	George Saunders	1935–1941	Democratic
	Walter Morrison	1941–1949	Republican
	George Baker	1949–1953	Democratic
	Homer Bruce	1953–1955	Republican
	George Baker	1955–1963	Democratic
	Bryon A. Anderson	1963–1974	Republican
	Mary Estill Buchanan	1974–1983	Republican
	Natalie Meyer	1983–1995	Republican
	Victoria Buckley	1995–1999	Republican
	Donetta Davidson	1999–2005	Republican
	Gigi Dennis	2005–2007	Republican
	Mike Coffman	2007–2009	Republican
	Bernie Buescher	2009–2011	Democratic
	Scott Gessler	2011–2015	Republican
	Wayne W. Williams	2015–2019	Republican
	Jena Griswold	2019–present	Democratic

== See also ==
- Bibliography of Colorado
- Geography of Colorado
- History of Colorado
- Index of Colorado-related articles
- List of Colorado-related lists
- Outline of Colorado
