= Keith King =

American politician (born 1963)

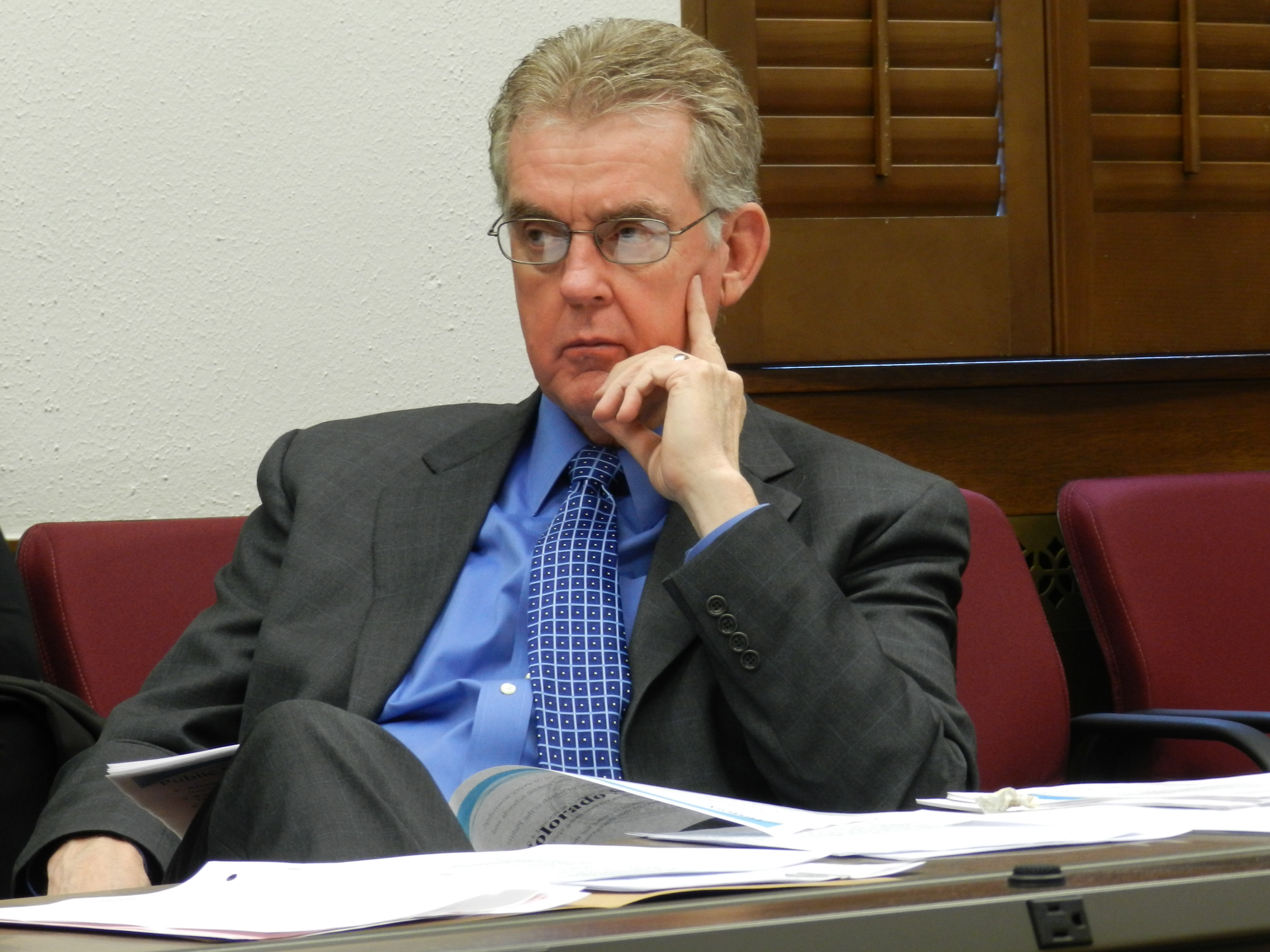
- King in 2011

Member of the Colorado Springs City Council
- In office 2013–2017

Colorado State Senator from the 12th District
- In office 2009–2013
- Preceded by: Andy McElhany
- Succeeded by: Bill Cadman

State Representative from 21st District
- In office 1999 – January 10, 2007
- Preceded by: Chuck Berry
- Succeeded by: Bob Gardner

Personal details
- Born: March 12, 1948 Tekoa, Washington, U.S.
- Died: February 3, 2024 (aged 75) Colorado Springs, Colorado, U.S.
- Party: Republican
- Spouse: Sandi King
- Website: Keith King for City Council District 3

Keith King (March 12, 1948 – February 3, 2024) was an American Republican politician from Colorado. A onetime small businessman, he served in both the Colorado House of Representatives and the Colorado Senate. Later, he served on the Colorado Springs City Council, representing District 3 from 2013 to 2017.

From 1999 to 2006, King represented House District 21 in the Colorado House of Representatives. On November 7, 2002, the Republican Caucus of the House chose King to serve as their Majority Leader, a post he held during the 2003-2004 legislative session. During this session, King also filled in as Governor of Colorado for a week. King was term-limited from the House at the end of 2006. King spent the first half of 2007 preparing to open Colorado Early Colleges Colorado Springs, one of the charter schools he has founded. Once classes started in August 2007, he served as the school's administrator. In 2008, King won election to the Colorado State Senate's 12th district, replacing Minority Leader Andy McElhany, who was term-limited at the end of the 2007-2008 session. In 2012, Colorado redrew Legislative boundaries and placed King in the same district as Minority Leader Bill Cadman. King declined to stand for reelection.

== Career in education and business ==
After graduating from Colorado State University-Pueblo in 1970, King spent seven years teaching high school and coaching basketball in California and Oregon; he also earned a master's degree from Oregon State University in 1976. The following year, King moved to Colorado Springs, Colorado, where he started "Waterbed Palace," a retail venture which grew to include 18 stores in Colorado, Oklahoma, New Mexico, Texas, Tennessee, and Virginia. In 1991, King was named "Retailer of the Year."

King turned from teaching to business, but he continued his work in the field of education, sitting on the Board of Cheyenne Mountain School District 12 from 1991 to 1995. The same year he relinquished his seat on the district board, he helped found Cheyenne Mountain Charter Academy, and served as its president from 1995 to 1998. In 1999, King took his passion for public policy to the Capitol in Denver.

== Political career ==
King served four terms as the State Representative from House District 21. Best known for his "charter-school and education legislation," King made contributions in many other areas as well, leading one commentator to see "his fingerprints...all over the map." King was named "Legislator of the Year" in 2002 by the Colorado Springs Chamber of Commerce and in 2003 by the Economic Development Council of Colorado. He served as Assistant Majority Leader from 2001 to 2002, Majority Leader from 2003 to 2004, and, but for the fact that the Democrats took control of the Legislature, would have become Speaker of the House in 2005. In 2004, King received a prestigious presidential appointment to the National Assessment Governing Board, an organization that monitors standardized testing nationwide. He was America's only Republican state legislator chosen for the board. He was term-limited from the board in November 2008. King was the president of Colorado Springs City Council Elected by District 3 until he was voted out in favor of Richard Skorman.

== Death ==
King died on February 3, 2024, at the age of 75.

=== Legislative awards ===
- 1999, University of Colorado, Colorado Springs – Alumni Legislative Award
- 1999, Colorado Association of Commerce and Industry Friend of Business Award
- 2000, National Federation of Independent Business – Guardian of Small Business
- 2000, Colorado Lawyers Committee – Community Contribution Award
- 2001, Mountain States Council, Legislator Recognition Award, Legislator of the Year
- 2001, Colorado Public Affairs Council – Star Award
- 2001, Colorado League of Charter Schools – Charter Friend Award
- 2002, Colorado Student Association – Student Voice Award
- 2002, Colorado Springs Chamber of Commerce – Legislator of the Year Award
- 2003, Economic Development Council of Colorado, Legislator of the Year
- 2004, Colorado Dental Association, Colorado Distinguished Leadership Award
- 2005, Children's Ark, Friends of the ARK award
