= Gordon Klingenschmitt =

American military officer, politician, and religious figure (born 1968)

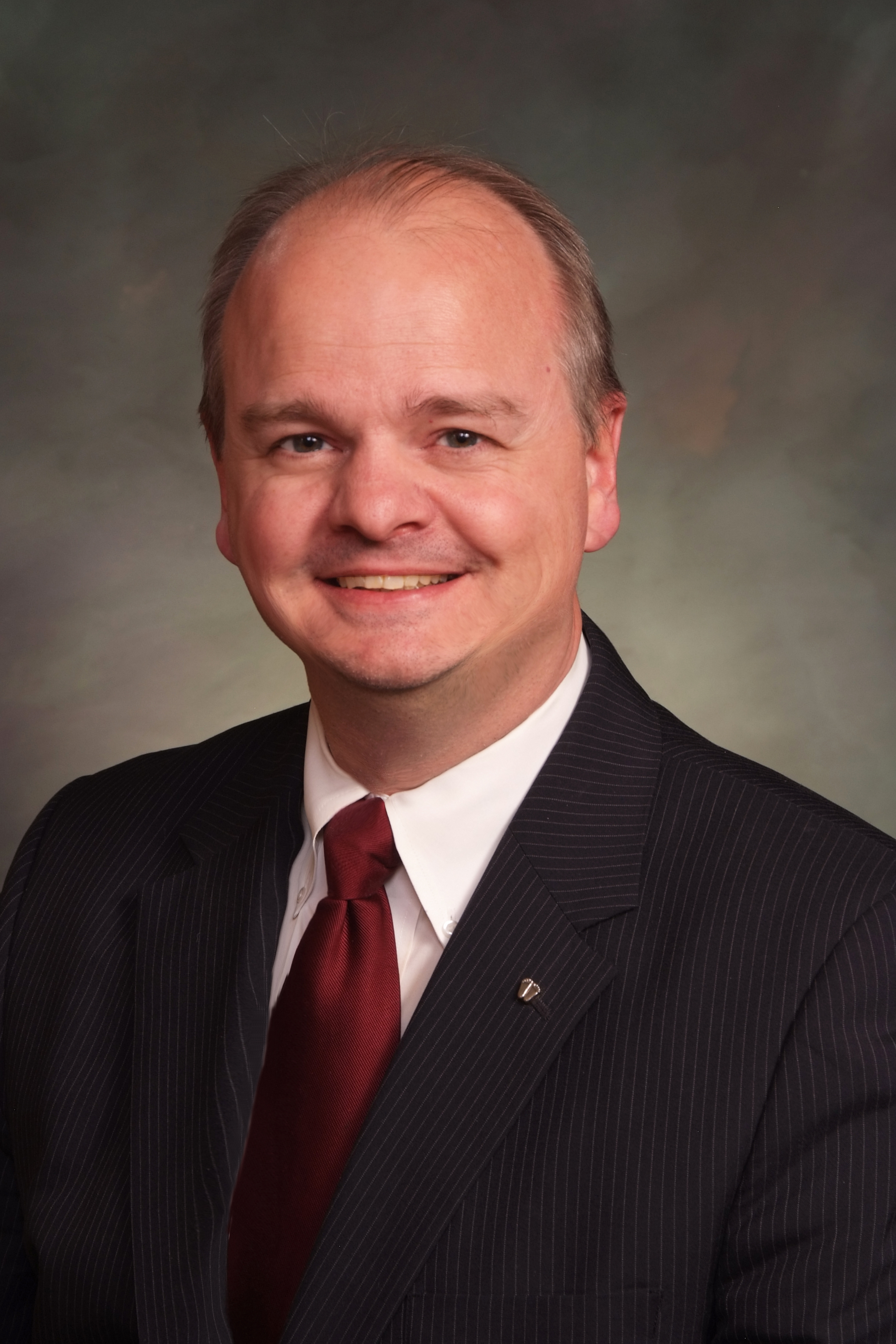
- Klingenschmitt in January 2015
- Born: 1968 (age 57–58); Buffalo, New York, US
- Other name: "Doctor Chaps"
- Education: BS, AF Academy (1991); PhD, Regent U. (2012)
- Occupations: Chaplain; missileer; politician; televangelist
- Political party: Republican
- Criminal charges: UCMJ Article 92
- Criminal penalty: Formal reprimand
- Spouse: Mary Elaine Keifert (m. 1991)
- Military career
- Branches: United States Air Force; United States Navy
- Years: 1991–2007 (15.8 years)
- Rank: Lieutenant (demoted from Major)
- Units: NORAD; USS Anzio (CG-68); Naval Station Norfolk

Signature
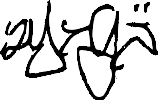

Ecclesiastical career
- Religion: Christianity
- Church: Evangelical Episcopal; Chaplaincy of Full Gospel

Member of the Colorado House of Representatives from the 15th district
- In office 2015–2017
- Preceded by: Mark Waller
- Succeeded by: Dave Williams

Gordon James Klingenschmitt (born 1968) is an American religious figure, former chaplain in the US Navy, and former politician.

A 1991 graduate of the US Air Force Academy, Klingenschmitt spent eleven years as an officer and missileer before accepting a demotion and transferring to the US Navy in 2002 to become a chaplain. There, his strong evangelical drive repeatedly conflicted with the military's religious pluralism, and he received rebuttals from Navy leadership, including his immediate supervisor, his captain, and the commander of Navy Region Mid-Atlantic. This led to his receiving lowered evaluations and reprimands, against which he protested by hunger striking in front of the White House. In 2006, Klingenschmitt was court-martialed for refusing to obey explicit orders prohibiting wearing his uniform "at media events or political protests"; he was issued a formal reprimand. After switching churches that same year, he automatically triggered a review of his professional qualifications which ultimately led to his dismissal from the military after a 15.8-year career.

Klingenschmitt's religious career is centered around his two organizations: the for-profit Pray in Jesus Name Project and the non-profit Pray in Jesus Name Ministries. The latter is designated as an anti-LGBTQ hate group by the Southern Poverty Law Center, and also publishes Klingenschmitt's TV show, Pray in Jesus Name. He was also the target of an unsuccessful lawsuit in 2009 after praying for the cursing and deaths of two men, who subsequently were targeted by harassment and vandalism.

He was elected into the Colorado House of Representatives for District 15 for the 2015–2017 term with 69.88 percent of the vote. There, he caused controversy and was briefly removed from his house committees by both suggesting that the Boy Scouts of America were inviting molestation by allowing homosexual leaders, and for repeatedly suggesting a woman's killing and the theft of her fetus was a punishment by his god for abortion in the United States. Legislatively, he opposed the prohibition of conversion therapy, opposed legal penalties for defendants guilty of religious discrimination, and sponsored one successful bill (about educational testing). Since his single two-year term in office, Klingenschmitt has failed to be elected into the Colorado Senate (2016), the vice-chairship of the El Paso County Republican Party (2017), and the Colorado Springs city council, twice (2019 and 2023).

== Personal life ==
Gordon James Klingenschmitt was born in Buffalo, New York in 1968 to a single mother. At age three, he was adopted by Carl and Joanne Klingenschmitt. In a ceremony officiated by Ted Haggard, Klingenschmitt married Mary Elaine Keifert (born 1965) on 1 June 1991 in Colorado Springs, Colorado.

Klingenschmitt's adoptive parents were devout members of the Catholic Church, and had their son baptized immediately. Despite this, and growing up in a community suffused with Christianity, he was not a practitioner. In his freshman year at the Air Force Academy, several Pentecostal ceremonies led Klingenschmitt to want "to be a preacher and missionary, [...] I wanted to tell the world about Jesus. This was my personal calling."

In 1986, Klingenschmitt was a senior at Clarence Central School in Clarence, New York. Upon his 1991 graduation from the United States Air Force Academy, Klingenschmitt received a Bachelor of Science in political science. In 1999, he was a recent divinity school graduate, and by April 2007, he was pursuing a Doctor of Theology at Regent University. In 2012, he received a Doctor of Philosophy from Regent.

== US military ==
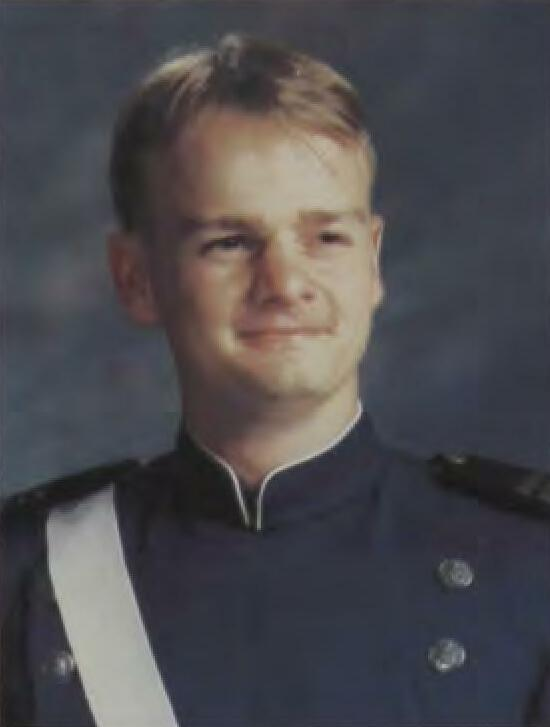
Cadet Klingenschmitt (c. 1991)

Klingenschmitt entered active duty with the United States Air Force on 29 May 1991. For the next eleven years, he served as an officer and missileer, including an assignment to NORAD. Klingenschmitt left the Air Force as a major on 2 September 2002, accepting a demotion (to lieutenant) to become a military chaplain in the United States Navy.

Klingenschmitt was quickly disillusioned at Chaplaincy School, finding that the military's religious pluralism for servicemembers of all faiths ran contrary to his evangelism, despite the National Conference on Ministry to the Armed Forces' code of ethics stating that chaplains must "function in a pluralistic environment". With an ecclesiastical endorsement from the Evangelical Episcopal Church, Klingenschmitt graduated from Naval Chaplaincy School in late November 2002. His first assignment was aboard USS Anzio (CG-68) under commanding officer (CO) Captain James M. Carr.

=== USS Anzio ===
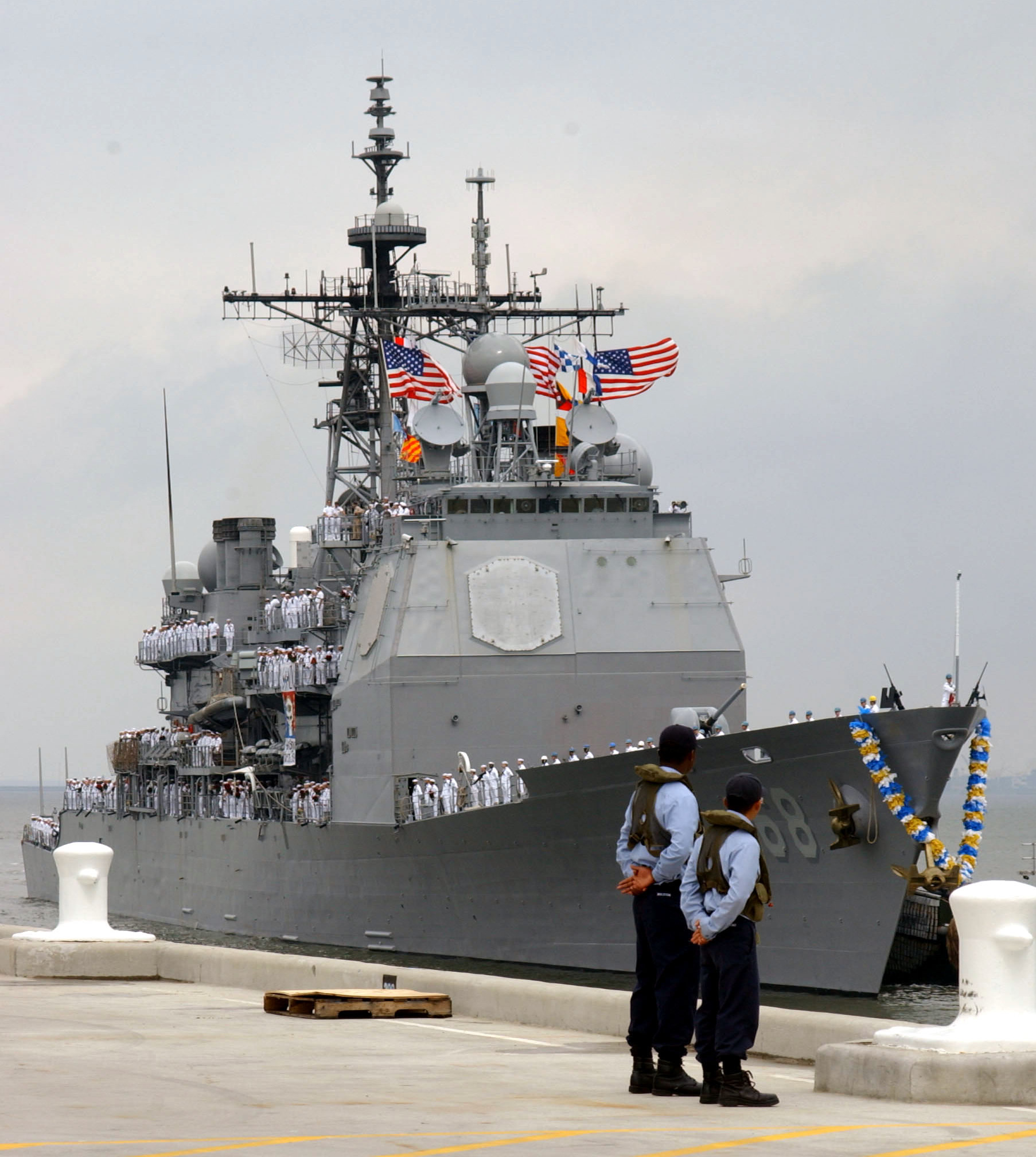
USS Anzio on 3 July 2003

When Anzio participated in Fleet Week 2004 in New York City, Klingenschmitt complained to his superiors about holding Fleet Week services at Marble Collegiate Church—as had been done for many years—because the church provided outreach to homosexual people and "endorses homosexual sin". Captain Carr later wrote that Klingenschmitt had "(incorrectly and improperly) created an impression in the highest levels of the U.S. Navy that Anzio and our Religious Ministries program were in contention with Navy policy to support Fleet Week obligations."

On 26 June 2004, Klingenschmitt spoke at the memorial service for a recently deceased Anzio sailor and preached about faith in Jesus "and the certainty of being 'cast into hell' if one did not". Over a dozen complaints were relayed to Captain Carr, who again counseled Klingenschmitt about inappropriate proselytization.

That July, Anzio sailors were surveyed about the ship's chaplaincy, and about 70% of written comments were negative about Klingenschmitt (including "worst CHAP I have seen in 17 years", "would never seek counsel from CHAPS", and "he is one of the worst CHAPs I have seen"). After receiving a 26/30 from Carr on his periodic Fitness Report, Klingenschmitt declined to provide a formal statement in response, instead submitting an Article 138 complaint against Carr, accusing the CO of religious persecution for lower markings than previously given; commander of Navy Region Mid-Atlantic (CNRMA) dismissed the complaint as meritless and endorsed Carr's report.

Klingenschmitt told the media that he had been unduly reprimanded for preaching about his religion. The Navy responded that he had "not received any punishment for language used in public forums". Furthermore, United States Department of Defense spokesman William J. Marks explained that chaplains were encouraged to evoke Jesus' name during actual Christian services; while non-religious events like promotion ceremonies or memorial services should be pluralistically sensitive, a prayer to Jesus at such a gathering would not warrant discipline or trouble for the chaplain.

In March 2005, Carr recommended that Navy Personnel Command not extend Klingenschmitt's active-duty tour, saying the lieutenant "demonstrated recurring confusion concerning a chaplain's role within a military organization." Klingenschmitt was transferred from Anzio to Naval Station Norfolk in April 2005, a move he characterized as punitive and foreshadowing the end of his career.

=== Naval Station Norfolk ===
After his assignment to Norfolk, in protest of the Navy's position on his religious proselytization, Klingenschmitt collaborated with US Representative Walter B. Jones Jr. to pressure President George W. Bush to issue a military–religious executive order that would guarantee "the right of chaplains to pray 'in the name of Jesus.'"

Invited onto Fox News' The O'Reilly Factor for 19 December 2005, Klingenschmitt wrote to President Bush on 15 December and said, "I'm scheduled to appear on Bill O'Reilly's TV show, and I plan to appear in uniform, unless you personally [sic] order me to wear civilian attire". On 16 December, Captain Lloyd Pyle, Jr.—CO of Naval Station Norfolk—issued the chaplain an explicit order: "pursuant to paragraph 1401.3(b) of the Navy Uniform Regulations, [Lieutenant] Klingenschmitt was prohibited from wearing his uniform for this appearance or for any other media appearance without Captain Pyle's 'express prior permission.'"

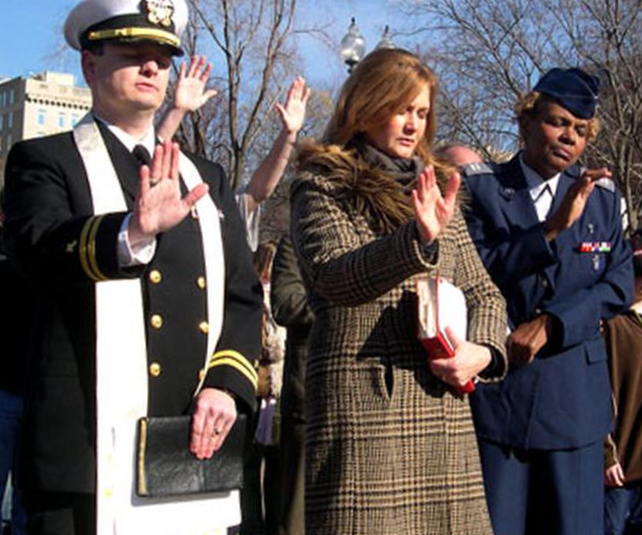
Klingenschmitt at the White House during his 18-day hunger strike

While on official leave in late December 2005, in an effort to prevent his anticipated dismissal from the Navy, and hoping to force President Bush's hand, Klingenschmitt began an 18-day hunger strike in front of the White House to protest the Navy "mandating nonspecific language in public, nondenominational events, and an order from superior officers prohibiting him from wearing his uniform during television appearances related to his protest". The Navy responded to Klingenschmitt's event by releasing a memorandum affirming their position "that sailors cannot wear their uniforms for media appearances without prior approval from command, but are permitted to do so for any legitimate worship services". Despite having declared he would only consume water "until the president of the United States gives me back my uniform and lets me pray publicly in Jesus' name", Klingenschmitt pointed to this Navy memo as his victory on 7 January 2006. He told the assembled press that "Today the Navy has reluctantly obeyed the law, to grant me the religious liberty I always should've had"; the military elaborated that there had been no changes in policy, and had not given Klingenschmitt carte blanche permission to publicly wear his uniform.

By February, Klingenschmitt was repeating the very same complaints about the Navy's policy of pluralistic inclusion at non-religious events, and William Marks reiterated the Navy's still-unchanged policies to the press. People for the American Way reported from a Vision America conference—called "The War on Christians and Values Voters in 2006"—that on 27 March, Klingenschmitt was the opening speaker; he reiterated his claims about the Navy's guidelines and policies, and ended by comparing himself to Abdul Rahman, who faced capital punishment in Afghanistan for leaving Islam and converting to Christianity.

After verifying that Pyle's orders restricted uniform-wear to "attending or participating in a bona fide religious service or observance", Klingenschmitt led prayers in uniform for a clergy lobbyist group's demonstration in Lafayette Square, Washington, D.C. before immediately removing parts of his uniform, replacing them with a clerical collar, and making statements to the assembled press. For these acts of disrespect to the uniform, plus a lack of military bearing and professionalism, and openly challenging his chain of command (by claiming to only answer to the president and using intemperate language to describe his leadership to the media), Klingenschmitt's 3 February 2006 Fitness Report was a lower 19/30, with "Military Bearing/Character" rated at 2/5.

Captain Pyle issued a letter of caution to Klingenschmitt for violating Article 89 of the Uniform Code of Military Justice (UCMJ) by disrespecting senior commissioned officers via "intemperate language" on the chaplain's personal website. Ordered to remove the offending material, Klingenschmitt did so, but cited the Military Whistleblower Protection Act in warning that "[w]hile I consented this one time to modify the content of my communications to Congress, I shall not do so again. [... I] will respect rank, but never their abuse of power and religious harassment, of which I directly accuse them in my whistleblower reports." These reports were part of a complaint Klingenschmitt filed with the Department of Defense Office of Inspector General (IG) on 4 April, alleging constitutional violations by his superiors and religious persecution; the IG found his claims without merit, and closed the case on 3 October.

=== Court-martial ===
Lieutenant Klingenschmitt had Captain Pyle's explicit orders to not wear his Navy uniform "at media events or political protests". In continuance of his protest of the Navy's prayer guidelines, he nonetheless wore his uniform to a press conference on 30 March 2006 in Lafayette Park. Klingenschmitt prayed at the event, and distributed a document detailing both his complaints about Navy policy, as well as his explicit intent to disobey orders about appearing in uniform.

On 27 April 2006, Pyle notified Klingenschmitt about his consideration of non-judicial punishment for the violation of orders and regulations. The lieutenant instead demanded a special court-martial, saying, "I want to defend my innocence in court [...] The public will see first hand how they are punishing a chaplain for his faith".

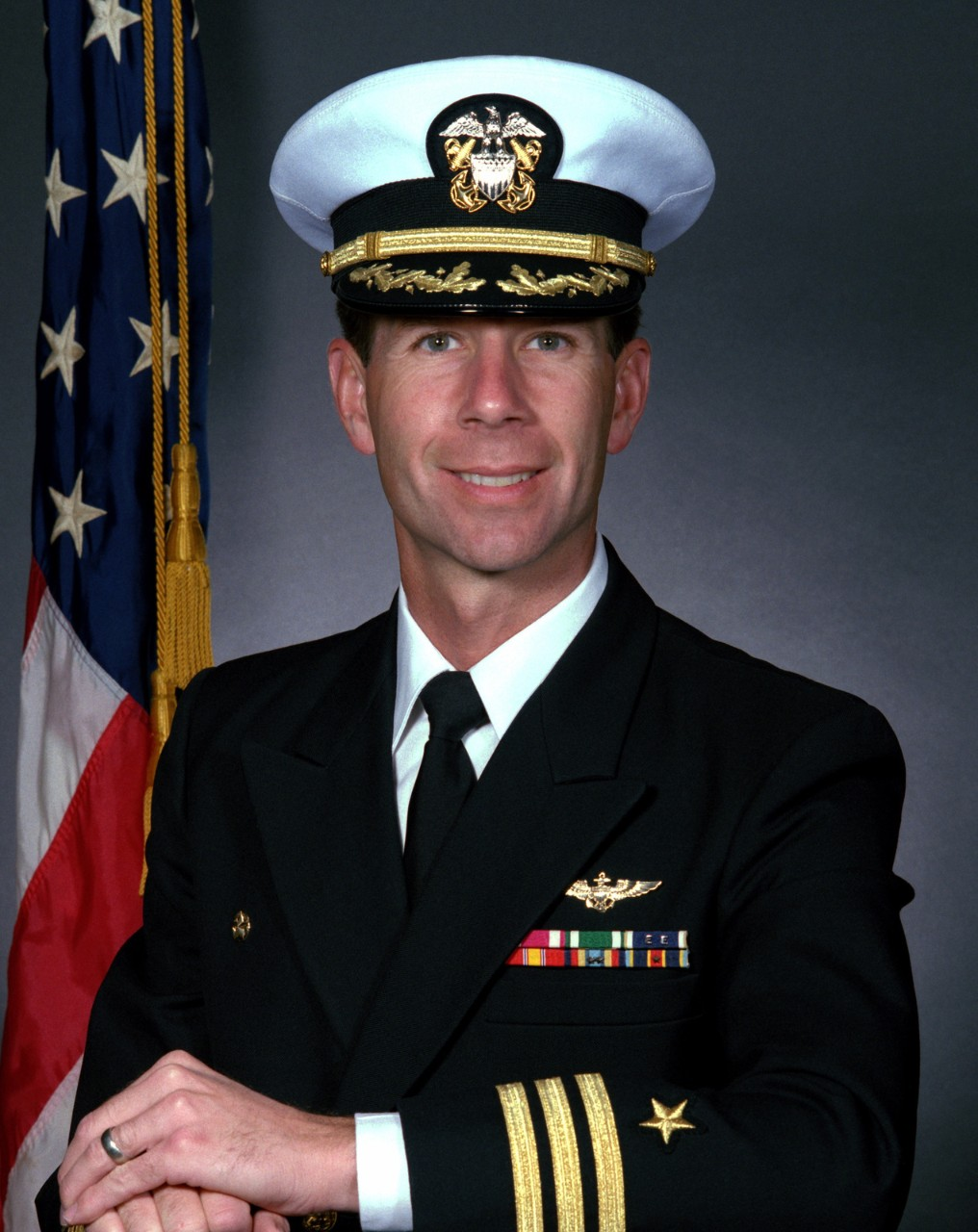
Rear Admiral Ruehe, CNRMA

He was formally charged with one count of Article 92 of the UCMJ (failure to obey order or regulation) on 3 August, whereafter he pled not-guilty and requested trial by jury. If found guilty, the utmost sentence imposable included a fine, forfeiture of US$41,925.6 (equivalent to $66,958 in 2025) over twelve months, a letter of reprimand, and two months' restriction to base; dismissal from the Navy was not a possible outcome based on the charges levied.

Klingenschmitt's first motion to dismiss claimed that Pyle's order was not lawful under the First Amendment to the United States Constitution, and his second alleged that CNRMA had a personal investment in the trial's outcome and could not convene the court-martial. Both were denied.

On 12 September 2006, Captain Norm Holcomb—Naval Station Norfolk's head chaplain and Klingenschmitt's supervisor—testified that leading a public prayer was not sufficient to categorize an event as a "bona fide religious service"; he described Klingenschmitt as "untruthful, unethical, insubordinate, contemptuous of authority, unteachable … a totally frustrating, independent operator". Lieutenant Commander Richard Inman was Holcomb's deputy, and he told the court that Holcomb had reminded Klingenschmitt of the uniform prohibition on 29 March; "He assured us a couple times that he would not wear his uniform". A witness from the Naval Chief of Chaplains' office testified she saw Klingenschmitt distributing pamphlets while in uniform. Represented by a military public defender and private civilian attorney on 13 September, Klingenschmitt testified that his 30 March actions were permissible because the news conference was "a bona fide worship service or observance". Despite having subpoenaed Roy Moore to testify, Klingenschmitt's civilian attorney called no witnesses, saying it was because the government's own evidence would exonerate his client; Klingenschmitt himself instead claimed it was because he heard his god's voice thrice the previous evening.

After 80 minutes of deliberation, the jury found Klingenschmitt guilty of "one misdemeanor count of disobeying a lawful order." They sentenced him to a formal reprimand and forfeiture of $3,000 (equivalent to $4,791 in 2025) over twelve months, but also recommended for Rear Admiral Frederic Ruehe (CNRMA) to suspend the financial sentence. Klingenschmitt said he would appeal the verdict "by all means possible all the way to the Supreme Court." Admiral Ruehe concurred with the jury's recommendation, suspended the financial sentence, and issued the written reprimand to Klingenschmitt on 3 January 2007.

=== Dismissal ===
If a chaplain loses ecclesiastical authority to function as an RMP [Religious Ministry Professional] or has ecclesiastical endorsement to serve as a chaplain withdrawn, the appropriate Religious Organization shall provide written notification to the Military Department concerned. Processing for separation in accordance with Section 643 of [Title 10 of the United States Code] shall be initiated immediately upon such notification.

Under regulations prescribed by the Secretary of Defense, a commissioned officer on the active-duty list of the Army, Navy, or Air Force who is appointed or designated as a chaplain may, if he fails to maintain the qualifications needed to perform his professional function, be discharged or, if eligible for retirement, may be retired.

— DoDI 1304.28, ¶ 6.5
& 10 U.S.C. § 643

On 25 September 2006, Klingenschmitt resigned from the Evangelical Episcopal Church, which immediately notified the Chief of Naval Personnel of Klingenschmitt's loss of ecclesiastical endorsement, effective 1 October. In accordance with Department of Defense Instruction 1304.28, paragraph 6.5, this immediately instigated separation proceedings. Klingenschmitt argued that a subsequent 29 September endorsement by the Chaplaincy of Full Gospel Churches should allow for continuity of endorsement, but Office of the Chief of Naval Operations Instruction 1120.9 nonetheless required recertification of professional qualifications.

An advisory board, the Chief of Naval Personnel, the Chief of Chaplains, and the Assistant Secretary of the Navy for Manpower and Reserve Affairs concurred against approving Klingenschmitt's new endorsement, based on professional unsuitability, disciplinary record, and unsatisfactory performance: "The Secretary concluded that you do not possess the character, leadership, or professional traits needed to successfully serve as a naval officer." On 1 March 2007, Klingenschmitt was formally and honorably separated from the US Navy.

=== Post-separation ===
While framing his dismissal from the Navy as punishment for his religion, Klingenschmitt was recognized by the Kentucky House of Representatives for his "service to God [sic], country and the Commonwealth of Kentucky", and invited to open that body's 7 March session with a prayer. Captain Holcomb wrote at length to the Kentucky House to not only refute Klingenschmitt's specific claims about the court-martial, but to characterize his ex-chaplain as "totally untruthful, unethical and insubordinate".

By June 2007, Klingenschmitt was touring churches, alleging that his court-martial was instead for invoking Jesus' name in public prayer, that his separation from the Navy was the result of his court-martial, and that his conviction had been overturned.

==== Legal and administrative ====
On 15 June 2007, a Naval Judge Advocate reviewed Klingenschmitt's court-martial as required by law and determined "the findings and sentence were correct as to law and fact, and that no material error existed". Klingenschmitt requested the Judge Advocate General of the Navy (JAG) to review the case and dismiss the conviction. On 15 June 2009, JAG Vice Admiral Bruce E. MacDonald denied Klingenschmitt's application, concurring with his advocate.

Alleging that his impending separation was a violation of Navy policies, religious persecution, a First-Amendment violation, and "that the Navy unconstitutionally established a Unitarian religion", Klingenschmitt filed suit against Secretary of the Navy Donald C. Winter in the District Court for the District of Columbia (D.D.C.). Judge Henry H. Kennedy Jr. dismissed Klingenschmitt v. Winter on 21 August 2007. Klingenschmitt appealed to the Court of Appeals for the District of Columbia Circuit, which affirmed D.D.C.'s decision on 14 April 2008.

From 11 February 2008 through 11 August 2010, Klingenschmitt repeatedly petitioned the Board for Correction of Naval Records to remove Carr and Pyle's Fitness Reports from his records, repeating many of his arguments about constitutional violations and religious persecution; the board declined all of his requests. He tried again at the United States Court of Federal Claims, but was ruled against by Judge Elaine D. Kaplan on 24 November 2014.

By late April 2012, Klingenschmitt had filed another lawsuit in efforts to "have his military career restored". In 2016, he filed a writ of certiorari with the Supreme Court of the United States, hoping to have the Roberts Court overrule the Navy's decision, be restored to the Navy chaplaincy, and receive his military salary back-dated to his dismissal.

== Religious career ==
Klingenschmitt publicly prayed for death and other curses to befall Barry W. Lynn (of the Americans United for Separation of Church and State) and Michael L. Weinstein (of the Military Religious Freedom Foundation). His targets were beset with "death threats, had a swastika emblazoned on their home in New Mexico, animal carcasses left on their doorstep and feces thrown at the house." In October 2009, Weinstein filed a lawsuit against Klingenschmitt to cease inciting and encouraging the harassment campaign. On 2 April 2012, Judge Martin Hoffman dismissed the lawsuit for lack of evidence connecting Klingenschmitt's exhortations with the threats and damages inflicted.

For a time, Klingenschmitt taught at Colorado Christian University, but was no longer faculty by March 2016.

=== Businesses ===
Klingenschmitt runs two similarly-named religious institutions. One is a for-profit religious entity called the Pray in Jesus Name Project.

Persuade the World Ministries, which operates under the trade name Pray in Jesus Name Ministries, was founded in 1999 as a tax-exempt 501(c)(3) organization with the goal "to promote and preach the gospel of Jesus Christ." In 2014, it raised $825,679 while spending $905,866 (equivalent to about $1.12M and $1.23M in 2025). Of its expenses, the most went to printing and postage (69%), administrative expenses (14%), and management (9%). The charity also funds Klingenschmitt's televangelist TV show: Pray in Jesus Name, where he calls himself "Doctor Chaps". Klingenschmitt himself does not draw "a salary or other compensation from the charity". When he used the platform to call a transgender six-year-old a demon, the organization was added to the Southern Poverty Law Center's anti-LGBTQ hate list.

After People for the American Way's Right Wing Watch (RWW) began using clips from Pray in Jesus Name to illustrate videos about Klingenschmitt's "incendiary comments", Klingenschmitt filed numerous DMCA takedown notices with YouTube, resulting in the repeated and temporary removal of both RWW's channel and videos. In late 2013, an intellectual property lawyer with Cozen O'Connor said that RWW's use was plainly legal and allowed under fair use, while the Electronic Frontier Foundation sent Klingenschmitt a cease and desist "outlining why [RWW's] videos constitute fair use and warning that misuse of procedures to 'shut down lawful speech can result in liability for any damages.'"

== Political office ==
=== Colorado House ===
==== Election campaign ====
With Mark Waller vacating the seat, Klingenschmitt announced his 2014 campaign for the 15th-district seat (Colorado Springs' east side) in the Colorado House of Representatives. He faced Mike Kuhn and Dave Williams for the Republican nomination and expected electoral win (with registered Republicans comprising 80% of the district electorate). Klingenschmitt claimed he was running for office because his god told him to, though shied away from his religious opinions while campaigning for office. By 19 February, he had received campaign contributions totaling $13,223 (equivalent to $17,983 in 2025), with 27% being his own money, and 44% coming from outside Colorado.

In the June primary election, only Klingenschmitt and Williams were on the ballot, respectively receiving 52.6% (3,472) and 47.3% (3,128) of the votes. Afterwards, the Colorado Republican Party chairman distanced the party from Klingenschmitt's controversial rhetoric such as comparing President Obama to a demon, calling homosexuality a sin, and declaring that "Obamacare causes cancer". That August, Klingenschmitt was again disavowed by his own party, as well as condemned by Colorado House Speaker Mark Ferrandino, for claiming that then-Representative Jared Polis wanted to behead Christians in the United States like ISIS did in Syria; he later walked back those remarks. By 3 September, Klingenschmitt had raised $34,400 (equivalent to $46,784 in 2025), with 23% self-funded.

In the general election, Klingenschmitt faced Democrat Lois Fornander. On 4 November, Klingenschmitt received 17,053 votes (69.88%), while Fornander received 7,350 (30.12%). One week later, Klingenschmitt told David Pakman that he would "probably tone down the rhetoric", having secured the election. In an interview with KUSA, he described himself as "one person, but I might wear two hats", referring to working both in the legislature and on Pray in Jesus Name, while keeping the two separate.

==== Service ====
Klingenschmitt was the 15th district representative for one term from 2015–2017.

House Bill 15-1175 proposed to prohibit Colorado-licensed medical professionals from providing conversion therapy; rather than speak up in the House to oppose the legislation, in early March, Klingenschmitt distributed a lengthy letter that outlined his numerous problems with the bill. That same month, he co-sponsored a bill that would prohibit legal penalties for defendants guilty of religious discrimination. As of 28 June 2016, Klingenschmitt had only sponsored one successful bill: requiring the Colorado Department of Education to investigate alternative tests for required state assessments.

He was succeeded by Dave Williams, who won the seat with 24,848 to 11,659 votes (68 to 32%).

==== Controversy ====
On 18 March 2015, a woman in Longmont, Colorado had her fetus cut out and killed. Klingenschmitt described the attack as an "act of God [sic]", a punishment for abortion in the United States. When he was criticized by the public, the Colorado Republican party, and former House minority leader Mark Waller, Klingenschmitt initially refused to retract the comments, repeating them on Pray in Jesus Name. With few disciplinary measures available, current minority leader Brian DelGrosso removed Klingenschmitt from his position in the Health, Insurance and Environment Committee on 30 March. Klingenschmitt decried the punishment as unfair, but nonetheless published an apology and announced a six-week hiatus of his religious TV show. His committee assignment was returned 22 days later on 21 April.

After the Boy Scouts of America ended their prohibition of homosexual leaders in July 2015, Klingenschmitt criticized the organization for putting children in danger of molestation. He was again strongly condemned by his own party, who emphasized that he did not speak on their behalf.

=== Other campaigns ===
Klingenschmitt ran in the primary for the twelfth-district seat in the 2016 Colorado Senate election. Running against Bob Gardner in the primary, Klingenschmitt filed a police report that October, accusing fellow representative Larry Liston of taking five Klingenschmitt-campaign flyers in collusion with Gardner. By 27 April, Klingenschmitt had raised $23,883.63 (equivalent to $32,040 in 2025), with himself as his largest donor (27%). The election was held on 28 June, and Klingenschmitt lost with 5,096 votes (38.2%) to Gardner's 8,231 (61.7%). He blamed "people [who] can lie, steal and cheat and violate their cadet honor oath and still win elections" for preventing his divinely-ordained win.

On 21 January 2017, Klingenschmitt announced his run for vice-chair of the Republican Party of El Paso County, Colorado. Upon the 11 February election, he lost with 30 percent of the vote to Josh Hosler's 55 percent. After claiming that party officials tampered with the election, Klingenschmitt appealed to the Colorado Supreme Court; on 28 May, that body declined to hear the case because "Klingenschmitt failed to produce evidence".

In 2019, Klingenschmitt ran for one of three at-large seats on the Colorado Springs city council, on a platform opposing taxation and predominant left-wing politics. With 27,063 votes, he lost to Wayne Williams (45,687 votes), Bill Murray (30,137 votes), and Tom Strand (29,919 votes). Klingenschmitt ran again in 2023 as one of eleven candidates for three at-large seats, and he came in sixth with 7.90 percent of votes cast.

=== Political views ===
Because of their "demonic spirit of child abuse", Klingenschmitt argued for disqualifying homosexual people from being teachers. His belief in Christianity similarly drove opposition to those same people being allowed to serve in the United States Armed Forces: during political discussions about repealing don't ask, don't tell, he advocated against the 112th United States Congress certifying the military as ready for such a change, and to "instead pass strong law's [sic] protecting the rights of Christian troops". He has also said that, "We gotta put [homosexual people] back in the closet. Especially if they're so flagrant they want to violate one another."

During his successful campaign for the Colorado House, Klingenschmitt's platform was anti-abortion, pro-gun, and strongly opposed to same-sex marriage.

=== Electoral history ===
2014, primary, Colorado state representative, 15th District
| Party | Candidate | Votes | % |
|---|---|---|---|
| Republican | Gordon Klingenschmitt | 3,472 | 52.6 |
| Republican | Dave Williams | 3,128 | 47.3 |

2014, general, Colorado state representative, 15th District
| Party | Candidate | Votes | % |
|---|---|---|---|
| Republican | Gordon Klingenschmitt | 17,053 | 69.88 |
| Democratic | Lois Fornander | 7,350 | 30.12 |

2016, primary, Colorado Senate, 12th District
| Party | Candidate | Votes | % |
|---|---|---|---|
| Republican | Bob Gardner | 8,231 | 61.7 |
| Republican | Gordon Klingenschmitt | 5,096 | 38.2 |

2017, general, vice-chair, Republican Party of El Paso County, Colorado
| Party | Candidate | Votes | % |
|---|---|---|---|
| Republican | Josh Hosler | | 55 |
| Republican | Gordon Klingenschmitt | | 30 |
| Republican | Anita Miller | | 16 |

2019, Colorado Springs city council, at-large
| Candidate | Votes | % |
|---|---|---|
| Wayne Williams | 45,687 | 18.72 |
| Bill Murray | 30,137 | 12.35 |
| Tom Strand | 29,919 | 12.26 |
| Gordon Klingenschmitt | 27,063 | 11.09 |
| Terry Martinez | 25,974 | 10.64 |
| Tony Gioia | 19,721 | 8.08 |
| Regina English | 18,737 | 7.68 |
| Athena Roe | 16,769 | 6.87 |
| Val Snider | 14,118 | 5.79 |
| Dennis Spiker | 9,334 | 3.83 |
| Randy Tuck | 6,563 | 2.69 |

2023, Colorado Springs city council, at-large
| Candidate | Votes | % |
|---|---|---|
| David Leinweber | 43,649 | 15.37 |
| Lynette Crow-Iverson | 40,470 | 14.25 |
| Brian Risley | 39,662 | 13.97 |
| Katherine Gayle | 28,205 | 9.93 |
| Glenn Carlson | 25,362 | 8.93 |
| Gordon Klingenschmitt | 22,424 | 7.90 |
| Roland Rainey, Jr. | 20,038 | 7.06 |
| Chineta Davis | 18,488 | 6.51 |
| Jay Inman | 16,384 | 5.77 |
| Jane Northrup Glenn | 14,768 | 5.20 |
| Jaymen Johnson | 14,534 | 5.12 |

== Published works ==
- "Let Us Pray". Proceedings. Vol. 133, no. 1. United States Naval Institute. January 2007. pp. 20–22. ISSN 0041-798X. "The government cannot tell chaplains how to pray (not even in school) nor exclude chaplains who pray 'the wrong way.'"
- "Lesslie Newbigin, Missionary Theologian: a Reader – Edited by Paul Weston". Religious Studies Review. 33 (3). Wiley-Blackwell: 217. July 2007. doi:10.1111/j.1748-0922.2007.00200_13.x. ISSN 0319-485X. OCLC 1682754.
- "Believe not Every Spirit: Possession, Mysticism & Discernment in Early Modern Catholicism – By Moshe Sluhovsky". Religious Studies Review. 34 (3). Wiley-Blackwell: 217. July 2008. doi:10.1111/j.1748-0922.2008.00301_3.x. ISSN 0319-485X. OCLC 1682754.
- Parco, James E.; Levy, David A., eds. (February 2010). "Burning Bibles and Censoring Prayers: Is That Defending Our Constitution?". Attitudes Aren't Free: Thinking Deeply about Diversity in the US Armed Forces (PDF). Maxwell Air Force Base: Air University Press. pp. 25–28. ISBN 978-1-58566204-3. Archived from the original (PDF) on 1 November 2022.
- How to See The Holy Spirit, Angels and Demons: Ignatius of Loyola on the Gift of Discerning of Spirits in Church Ethics. Eugene, Oregon: Wipf and Stock. 2013.
