= Marc Snyder =

American politician

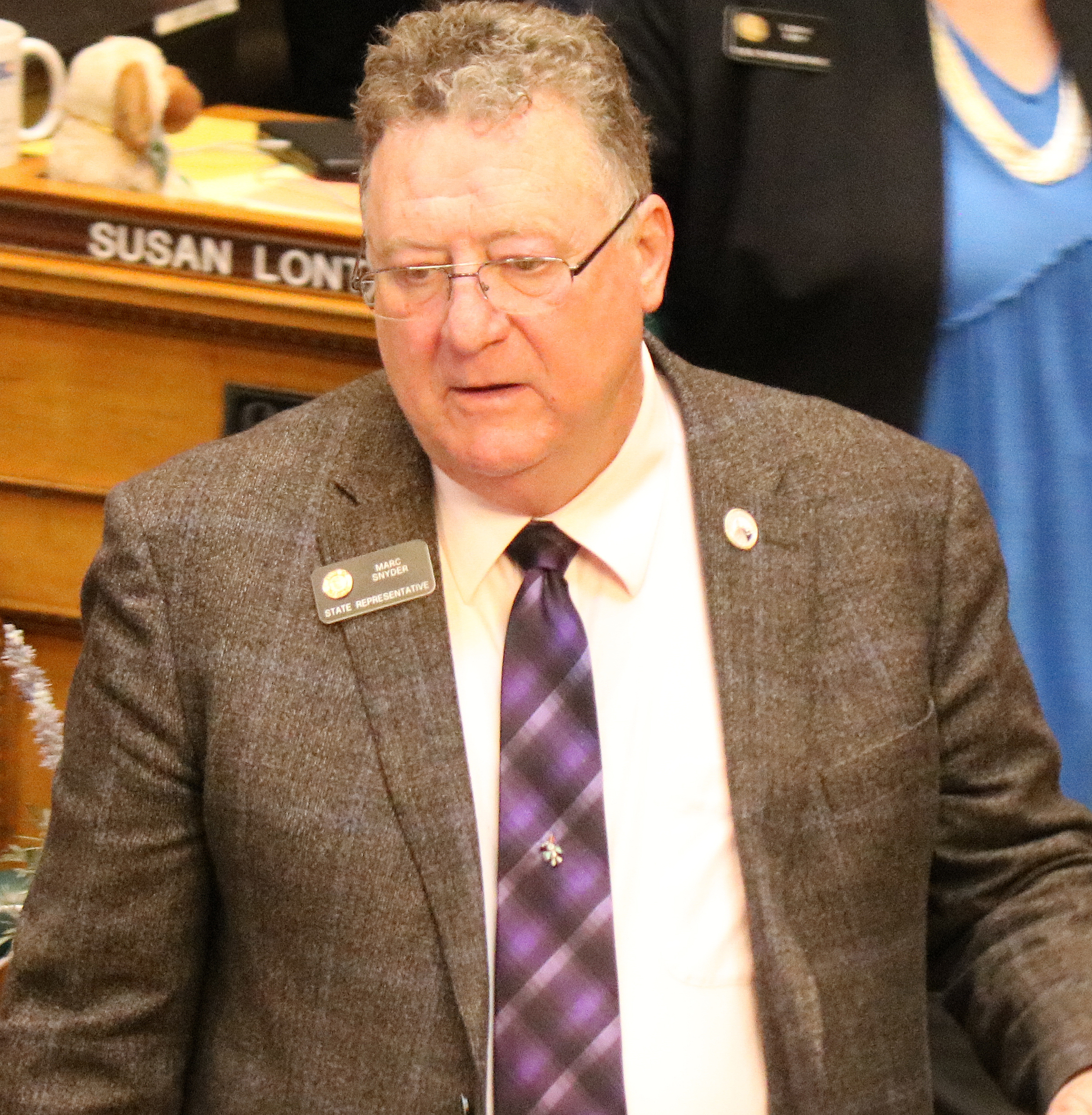

Member of the Colorado Senate from the 12th district
- Incumbent
- Assumed office January 8, 2025
- Preceded by: Bob Gardner

Member of the Colorado House of Representatives for District 18
- In office January 4, 2019 – January 8, 2025
- Preceded by: Pete Lee
- Succeeded by: Amy Paschal

Personal details
- Born: January 6, 1961 (age 65)
- Party: Democratic

Marc Alan Snyder (born January 6, 1961) is an American politician who is the member of the Colorado Senate from the 12th district in El Paso County.

== Political career ==
=== Election ===
Snyder was elected in the general election on November 6, 2018, winning 57 percent of the vote over 36 percent of Republican candidate Mary Fabian.

== Elections Results ==
2018 Democratic State House District 18 Primary Election
Party	Candidate	Votes	%
Democratic	Marc Snyder	5,279	55.0%
Democratic	Terry Martinez	4,312	45.0%

2018 General State House District 18 Election
Party	Candidate	Votes	%
Democratic	Marc Snyder	20,778	57.5%
Republican	Mary Elizabeth Fabian	12,853	35.6%
Independent Politician	Maile Foster	2,489	6.9%

2020 General State House District 18 Election
Party	Candidate	Votes	%
Democratic	Marc Snyder	26,325	59.1%
Republican	George Rapko	16,331	36.6%
Libertarian	Nathan Foutch	1,907	4.3%

2022 General State House District 18 Election
Party	Candidate	Votes	%
Democratic	Marc Snyder	20,057	52.8%
Republican	Shana Black	16,826	44.3%
Libertarian	Greg Lauer	1,101	2.9%

2024 General State Senate District 12 Election
Party	Candidate	Votes	%
Democratic	Marc Snyder	36,758	48.9%
Republican	Stan VanderWerf	35,728	47.5%
Libertarian	John Angle	2,735	3.6%
