= Colorado's 15th House of Representatives district =

American legislative district

Colorado's 15th State House of Representatives district
Representative
Scott Bottoms; R–Colorado Springs
- Demographics: 58% White; 6% Black; 22% Hispanic; 5% Asian; 0% Native American; 8% Multiracial
- Population (2021): 97,084

Colorado's 15th House of Representatives district is one of 65 districts in the Colorado House of Representatives. It has been represented by Scott Bottoms since 2023.

== Geography ==
District 15 is based in eastern Colorado Springs, and includes the suburb of Cimarron Hills.

== Members ==
- Ron May (1993–2001)
- Bill Cadman (2001–2007)
- Douglas Bruce (2008–2009)
- Mark Waller (2009–2017)
- Gordon Klingenschmitt (2015–2017)
- Dave Williams (2017–2023)
- Scott Bottoms (since 2023)
