= Mark Waller (politician) =

American politician

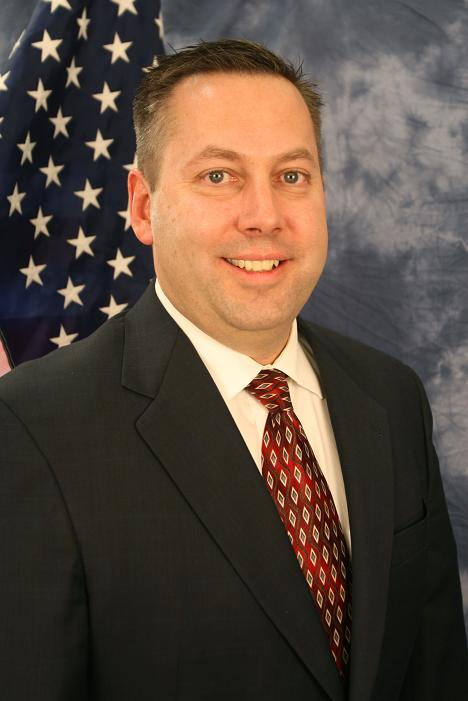

El Paso County Commissioner from the 2nd district
- In office June 19, 2016 – January 12, 2021
- Preceded by: Amy Lathen
- Succeeded by: Carrie Geitner

Member of the Colorado House of Representatives from the 15th district
- In office January 7, 2009 – January 7, 2015
- Preceded by: Douglas Bruce
- Succeeded by: Gordon Klingenschmitt

Personal details
- Born: 1969 Macomb, Illinois
- Party: Republican
- Children: Truman; Camille
- Education: University of Denver; University of North Dakota; Southern Illinois University at Edwardsville
- Occupation: Attorney

Mark Waller (born 1969) is a former Colorado county commissioner as well as a former legislator in the U.S. state of Colorado and county level assistant district attorney. Elected to the Colorado House of Representatives as a Republican in 2008, Waller had represented House District 15, which encompasses portions of northeastern Colorado Springs, Colorado. Waller also served in the US Air Force from 1993 until 2000, joining the Air Force Reserves in 2001, and following his graduation from the University of Denver Law School, he worked as an attorney prosecuting insurgents during the Iraq War; he was deployed in 2006.

Waller obtained his B.S. in political science from Southern Illinois University at Edwardsville in 1992, his M.S. in space studies from the University of North Dakota in 1998, and his J.D. from the University of Denver College of Law in 2003. His professional experience includes working as deputy district attorney for the 10th Judicial District of Pueblo Colorado, reservist for the legal office of 21st Space Wing, Peterson AFB, space systems operator for Schriever AFB, and a private attorney. Waller served as an officer in the United States Air Force.

== Legislative career ==
=== 2008 election ===
Mark Waller defeated incumbent Rep. Douglas Bruce in the contested Republican primary in August, taking 52 percent of votes cast.

Waller faced Democrat Leslie Maksimowicz in the November 2008 general election. Waller's candidacy was endorsed by the Denver Post and the Colorado Springs Independent, and he won election to the legislature with 66 percent of votes cast.

=== 2009 legislative session ===
For the 2009 legislative session, Waller was named to seats on the House Education Committee and the House Judiciary Committee.

Waller sponsored legislation to require disclosure on clothes collection bins operated by for-profit companies, to include a new derivative of methamphetamine to Colorado's list of banned drugs, and to exclude dry-ice bombs from a felony list of explosives, and to allow homeschooled students to enroll in college classes.

=== 2010 legislative session ===
During the 2010 legislative session, Waller concentrated on criminal-justice related bills. A bill based on Governor Bill Ritter's criminal justice commission addressed reforming possession-related drug offenses, reducing some of the felonies and redirecting money toward treatment and recidivism reduction. Waller also worked to stop House Bill 1205, a military exclusion bill that Waller viewed as unfair in regards to private property rights; he sought to reconcile interests of both military installations and private property owners, particularly in terms of the prevalence of both within his district.

=== 2010 election ===
Waller defeated Democrat Marcus Cimino with 74.7% of the 26,229 votes cast in the 2010 Midterm Election.

=== 2012 election ===
In the 2012 General Election, Representative Waller faced Libertarian challenger Larry Reedy. Waller was reelected by a margin of 73% to 15% with other third-party candidates garnering the remainder of the vote.

=== 2013 legislative session ===
Waller served as House Minority leader during the 2013 legislative session. A bipartisan effort with Democrat Pete Lee passed legislation that moved forward the state's restorative justice programs, albeit with compromises acknowledged on Waller's part.

== Post-legislative career ==
=== 2014 election ===
When John Suthers left the position to run in the 2015 Colorado Springs mayoral election, Waller declared his candidacy for Colorado Attorney General. Following a low performance in the primary on June 24, Waller withdrew from the race and endorsed Cynthia Coffman, who went on to win the November election.

=== 2016 election ===
Following a defeat of his primary opponent Tim Geitner, Waller was sworn in as El Paso County Commissioner for District 2, which encompasses the eastern side of Colorado Springs and the eastern edges of El Paso County. Waller took his seat early due to his predecessor, Amy Lathen, exiting her position for another job in June 2016. Waller's four-year term began on January 11, 2017, following his win in the November 2016 General Election.

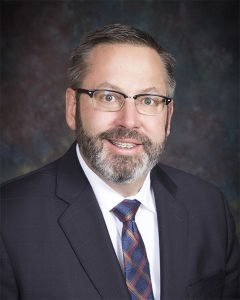
Mark Waller, 2019

=== 2020 election ===
Waller declared his candidacy for the position of District Attorney in the 4th Judicial District in June 2019. He faced Senior Deputy District Attorney Michael Allen in the GOP primary, held June 30, 2020. Both Waller and Allen secured multiple endorsements early in the contest; Waller's included El Paso County Sheriff Bill Elder, while Allen was endorsed by John Suthers Allen won the race on June 30 by around 8,000 votes. Waller's term as county commissioner ended after 2020.
