= Bill Cadman =

American politician

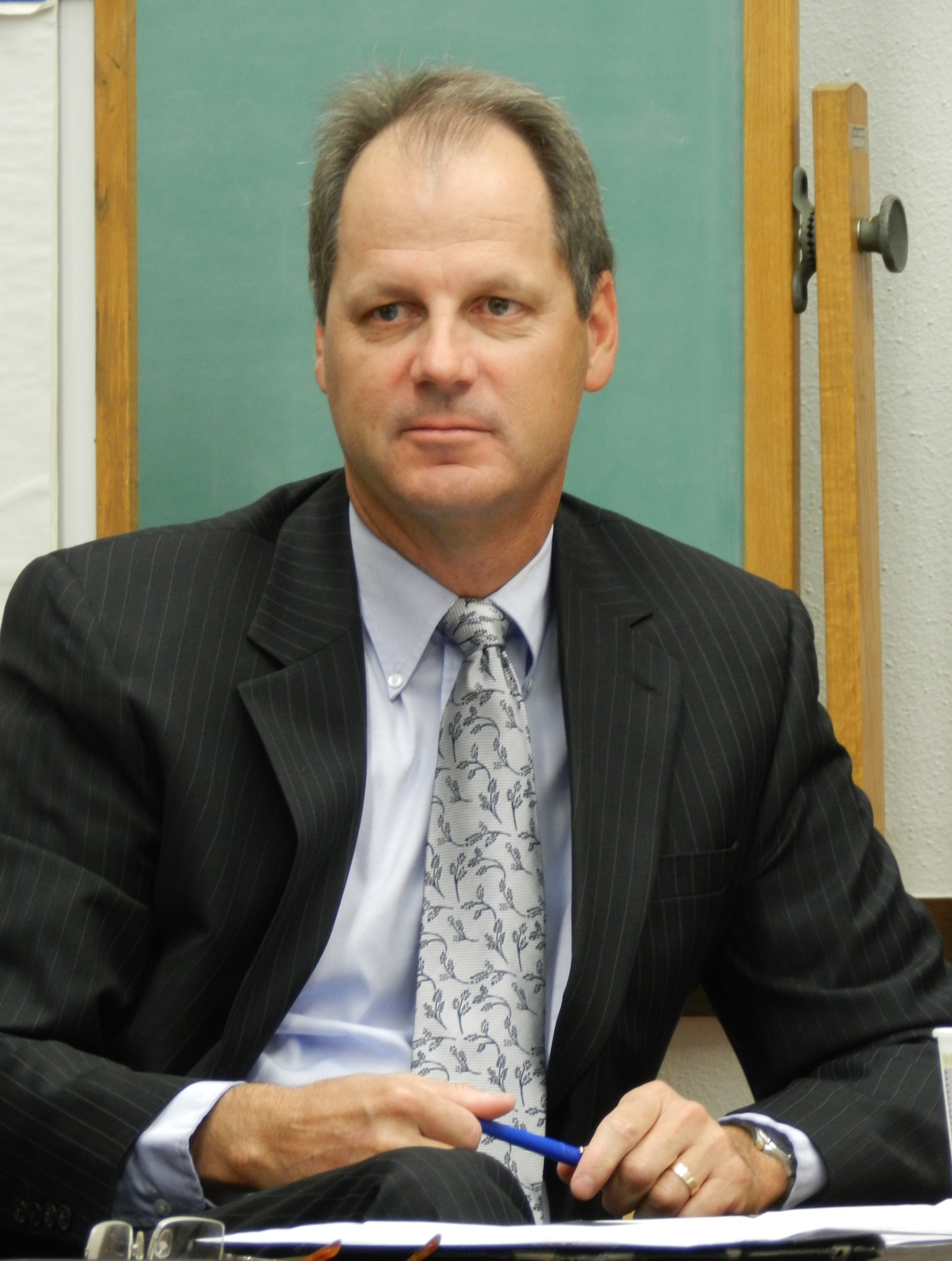
- Cadman in 2010.

President of the Colorado Senate
- In office January 7, 2015 – January 11, 2017
- Preceded by: Morgan Carroll
- Succeeded by: Kevin Grantham

Minority Leader of the Colorado Senate
- In office October 2011 – January 7, 2015
- Preceded by: Mike Kopp
- Succeeded by: Morgan Carroll

Member of the Colorado Senate from the 12th district
- In office January 9, 2013 – January 11, 2017
- Preceded by: Keith King
- Succeeded by: Bob Gardner

Member of the Colorado Senate from the 10th district
- In office December 11, 2007 – January 9, 2013
- Preceded by: Ron May
- Succeeded by: Owen Hill

Member of the Colorado House of Representatives from the 15th district
- In office January 10, 2001 – December 10, 2007
- Preceded by: Ron May
- Succeeded by: Douglas Bruce

Personal details
- Born: October 4, 1960 (age 65) Hollywood, Maryland, U.S.
- Party: Republican
- Spouse: Lisa
- Education: Montana State University, Bozeman; University of Maryland, College Park; Saddleback College; California State University, Fullerton

Bill Lee Cadman (born October 4, 1960) is an American politician who is a former Colorado state legislator. First elected to the Colorado House of Representatives in 2000, Cadman was appointed to fill a vacancy in the Colorado Senate in 2007. Later, he represented Senate District 12, which covers rural Colorado Springs, Fort Carson, Security-Widefield, Cimarron Hills, and Cheyenne Mountain.

He was on the board of directors of the American Legislative Exchange Council (ALEC), a national association of legislators. In 2015, he was elected as President of the Colorado Senate when the GOP won control of the chamber for the 1st time in ten years. He left those offices on January 11, 2017. He was previously Republican Leader while in the minority.

== Biography ==
Born in Hollywood, Maryland, Cadman earned a bachelor's degree from California State University in 1989 before settling in Colorado. Cadman worked as the office manager for U.S. Representative Joel Hefley from 1994 to 2000. From 1996-98, he was a board member of the Colorado Republican Party. Cadman is married; he and his wife, Lisa, have two children and live in Colorado Springs.

== Colorado House of Representatives ==
In 2000, he was elected to the Colorado House of Representatives, representing House District 15, which covered eastern Colorado Springs, Colorado. Cadman rose to become House Majority Whip during the 2003–2004 session.

Cadman won re-election to four terms in the House, defeating a series of Democratic opponents (Steven Bell in 2000, Charley Johnson in 2002, Bill Martin in 2004, and Allison Hunter in 2006), each time claiming more than 65% of the vote. During his time in the majority, Cadman sponsored legislation on the subjects of immigration, eviction practices, and domestic violence laws.

After Democrats took control of the legislature in 2004, Cadman served as Minority Caucus Chair. During the 2007 legislative session, he sat on the House State, Veterans, and Military Affairs Committee, and on the legislature's Joint Computer Management Committee.

== Colorado State Senate ==
=== 2007 appointment and 2008 election ===
Term-limited in the State House, Cadman filed to run for the Colorado Senate in the 2008 legislative elections, seeking the seat held by Senator Ron May who was himself term-limited. Upon May's resignation in October 2007, Cadman sought and unanimously won a vacancy appointment to May's seat in the Colorado Senate. He resigned from the State House on December 10, 2007, and was sworn into the Senate on December 11.

He faced opposition in the 2008 election from Democrat Diane Whitley, but ultimately won election to the Senate with 65% of the vote.

=== 2009 legislative session ===
During the 2009 legislative session, Cadman was the prime sponsor of a Senate Joint Memorial focusing on protecting the rights of workers to cast secret ballots in workplace elections. SJM 09-007 fought to counter-act the "Employee Free Choice Act" that would force employees to cast secret ballots for union elections in the presence of a union organizer. The bill would have urged Congress to stop the EFCA from passing. The bill, while supported by the entire Senate Republican Caucus, failed to reach the Colorado House of Representatives as it was postponed indefinitely in the Senate State, Veterans, and Military Affairs Committee.

=== 2010 legislative session ===
In 2010, Cadman sponsored HB10-1287 with Representative Lambert that would have disallowed state employees from using state-owned vehicles for commuting purposes. The bill, which would have freed up $3 million for the state budget, passed through both chambers before reaching the Governor's desk. Governor Bill Ritter, a Democrat, vetoed the bill, claiming it "sweeps too broadly" and would diminish public safety in the process.

=== 2011 legislative session ===
Senator Cadman sponsored several legislative measures throughout the course of the 2011 legislative session, one of the biggest measures being HB 11-1284. This bill would have impacted how beer is sold throughout Colorado, allowing grocery stores and convenience stores to sell full-strength beer. The bill was first introduced the House and assigned to the Committee on Economic and Business Development where it was passed to the House floor; however, the bill was postponed indefinitely during second reading.

In 2011 after Senator Kopp’s resignation, Senator Cadman was elected to serve as the Minority Leader by the Colorado Senate Republican Caucus.

=== 2012 legislative session ===
During the 2012 session, one of the several bills Cadman sponsored was a bill urging state agencies to seek Colorado-specific solutions "in lieu of federal regulations whenever possible". HB 12-1175 would have focused on finding solutions to local problems on a local level, instead of applying a "one-size fits all" idea from federal solutions, giving state’s more control. The legislation passed through the House before being assigned to the Senate Health and Human Services committee, where it was postponed indefinitely by a party-line 3–5 vote.

In 2012, Cadman was re-elected as Minority Leader for the Senate Republican Caucus by his peers. He served on the Legislative Council and the Executive Committee of Legislative Council due to his leadership role.

=== 2012 election ===
After the redistricting of Colorado’s legislative seats in 2011, Senator Cadman was drawn into Senate District 12 with Senator Keith King. Therefore, in order avoid a contested primary of two current legislators, Senator King [Keith King], deferred to Senator Cadman and chose not to run for re-election.

During the general election, Cadman faced no Democratic opponent; his opponents were Dave Respecki from the Libertarian Party, and James Bristol from the American Constitution Party. Cadman won 68.2% of the vote.

=== 2013 legislative session ===
Senator Cadman was re-elected as Minority Leader by the Republican Caucus and will continue to serve on the Legislative Council and Executive Committee of Legislative Council as well.
