= Douglas Bruce =

American politician and activist (born 1949)

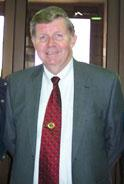
- Bruce in 2005

Member of the Colorado House of Representatives from the 15th district
- In office January 14, 2008 – January 7, 2009
- Preceded by: Bill Cadman
- Succeeded by: Mark Waller

Personal details
- Born: Douglas Edward Bruce; August 26, 1949 (age 77) Los Angeles, California, U.S.
- Party: Republican
- Education: Pomona College (BA); University of Southern California (JD)

Douglas Edward Bruce (born August 26, 1949) is an American conservative activist, attorney, and former legislator who served in the Colorado House of Representatives from 2008 to 2009, and in 2011 was convicted of money laundering, attempted bribery of a public official, and tax fraud.

He is also known for being the author of Colorado's Taxpayer Bill of Rights (TABOR). A strict advocate for limited government, Bruce wrote and promoted TABOR, a spending limitation measure approved by Colorado voters in 1992. His name is so associated with the measure that attempts to bypass its restrictions are known as "de-Brucing."

After two unsuccessful campaigns for the Colorado Senate in 1996 and 2000, Bruce was elected to the El Paso County Commission in 2004. Bruce was appointed to a vacant seat in the Colorado House of Representatives in December 2007 and represented House District 15, which includes eastern Colorado Springs. After kicking a Rocky Mountain News photographer on the day he was sworn in, Bruce became the first legislator in Colorado history to be formally censured. He was later removed from a House committee overseeing veterans affairs after refusing to sponsor a ceremonial resolution honoring veterans. Although defeated for election to a full term in the August 2008 Republican Party primary, Bruce continued his activism to reduce government expenditures and taxes in Colorado Springs and statewide.

In 2010, Bruce was indicted for money laundering, attempted bribery of a public official, and tax fraud involving the use of a charitable organization and anti-tax activism. In 2011, Bruce was convicted of all counts in the indictment, including four counts of felony criminal activity including money laundering, attempted improper influence of a public official, and tax fraud. He was discovered to be using a small-government charity he founded to hide millions of dollars from the state department of revenue. He was sentenced on February 13, 2012 to a total of 180 days in jail, ordered to pay a total of $49,000 in fines, and subject to six months of probation which included extensive disclosure requirements.

== Early life and education ==
Born in Los Angeles, California, Bruce graduated from Hollywood High School at the age of 16 and then from Pomona College with a double major in history and government. He earned a Juris Doctor from the USC Gould School of Law in 1973 and worked as a Los Angeles County deputy district attorney from 1973 to 1979, resigning amid frustration with the court system.

== Career ==
In 1980, Bruce ran a largely self-financed campaign for the California State Assembly, running in the Democratic Primary for the 38th Assembly district, which, at that time, centered on Pacific Palisades and Malibu. Running with the campaign slogan "Specifics, Not Safe Generalities," Bruce ran what a local newspaper described as "something of an anomaly, a law and order primary campaign by a Democrat." Bruce lost by five percentage points in a high-turnout primary. His opponent, Steven Afriat, narrowly lost the general election to Republican Marian W. La Follette.

=== Move to Colorado and rental properties ===
During the late 1970s, Bruce acquired a number of rental properties in the Los Angeles area, which he managed full-time after leaving the district attorney's office. During the late 1970s and early 1980s, Bruce was embroiled in several protracted tax disputes with the Internal Revenue Service. In 1986, Bruce acquired several properties in Colorado Springs and moved to Colorado permanently. Shortly before moving to Colorado, Bruce changed his political party affiliation from Democrat to Republican.

In addition to his Colorado Springs properties, Bruce acquired rental properties in Denver and Pueblo, Colorado. He has been cited repeatedly by law and code enforcement officials regarding the upkeep of his properties, although most of the dozens of citations brought against him have been overturned. In connection with charge of operating an unsafe building, Bruce spent eight days in jail in 1995 on a contempt of court citation. In response to the numerous complaints filed against him, Bruce has questioned the constitutionality of city code provisions, and accused city officials of selective prosecution and carrying out a "vendetta" against him personally.

In 2003, Bruce announced that he intended to sell his rental properties in order to devote more time to political activism, but was cited by Colorado Springs for keeping dilapidated properties as recently as 2007. In 2008, Bruce was cited by Colorado Springs for two properties they considered "dilapidated," in part because of windows boarded up under orders from the city, but the charges were ultimately dropped when Bruce sold the buildings. Shortly before his August 2008 legislative primary, Colorado Springs declared a four-plex owned by Bruce as "dilapidated;" Bruce responded that he had put money into repairing the building and readying it for sale. In early 2010, Colorado Springs told Bruce that it would charge him $40,000 to restart water service at seven of his rental properties, a charge that Bruce said amounted to political retaliation, but that city staff justified by noting all of the properties had been abandoned.

=== Taxpayer's Bill of Rights ===
Although similar tax-limitation measures had been rejected by voters over the previous decades, in 1988, Bruce authored and led the campaign that was eventually successful in enacting TABOR, a "Taxpayer Bill of Rights," in Colorado. Among other provisions, TABOR mandated voter approval of any tax increases and constrained state government spending to grow at a rate no greater than the rates of population growth and inflation. Although TABOR did not pass in 1988, garnering only 42% of the vote in a statewide reference, Bruce revised the measure and it was placed on the ballot again in 1990, when it received 49% support. A third attempt in 1992 was successful, and TABOR was passed with 54% of the vote and became part of Colorado's constitution. In 1997, TABOR's restrictions on state spending were triggered for the first time, resulting in refunds to taxpayers.

During these campaigns, Bruce was the primary spokesperson for TABOR, often trading barbs with TABOR opponent and Colorado governor Roy Romer. In one frequently-cited incident, Romer likened the TABOR proposal to "economic terrorism;" in response, Bruce printed personal business cards reading "Douglas Bruce: Terrorist." The passage of TABOR was Bruce's most prominent political accomplishment; years later, Bruce's personalized license plate read "MRTABOR." Bruce also wrote and successfully passed a similar spending limitation measure in Colorado Springs in 1991. The statewide and local effects of TABOR on government finances led Colorado College political science professor Robert D. Loevy, in 2009, to call Bruce "the most influential Colorado politician of his time."

Since the passage of TABOR in 1992, hundreds of local jurisdictions in Colorado have sought voter approval to temporarily or permanently exceed the spending limitations of TABOR, measures which became known as "de-Brucing," in reference to TABOR's author. By 2007, over half of Colorado's school district and counties had "de-Bruced," as had many municipalities. TABOR's budget restrictions were frequently cited by officials in Bruce's native El Paso County as resulting in deficiencies in health, law enforcement, and administrative services, and on the state level, creating financial difficulties for higher education.

In 2005, after several years of tight budgets brought about by recession, the spending limitations of TABOR, and other budgetary obligations, the Colorado General Assembly referred Referendum C, a statewide "de-Brucing" measure, to Colorado voters. Bruce was a vocal opponent of Referendum C, facing off against supporters including Gov. Bill Owens, who had supported the original passage of TABOR. Referendum C, which was ultimately passed by voters, authorized a five-year "hiatus" from some of TABOR's spending restrictions. Although Bruce threatened a lawsuit against the state of Colorado if the referendum passed, the measure was ultimately enacted into law, raising state revenue by several billion dollars.

In 2008, following his term in the state legislature, Bruce argued against a measure to reverse some of the spending restrictions of the Taxpayer's Bill of Rights. The initiative, known as the Savings Account for Education, would divert refunds given to taxpayers under TABOR to a special fund for K-12 education. Bruce opposed the measure in legislative hearings and then filed a legal challenge once House Speaker Andrew Romanoff, its primary proponent, sought to place the measure on the Colorado ballot as a citizen initiative. The measure was ultimately placed on the November 2008 statewide ballot as Amendment 59, and Bruce launched a website opposing it.

=== State senate campaigns ===
Bruce's first attempt to seek elected office in Colorado came in 1996, when Bruce challenged incumbent Republican state senator Ray Powers in the Republican Party primary. Bruce lost to Powers, who went on to become the Colorado State Senate President. Because of the negativity of Bruce's campaign against Powers, Bruce was the only person banned from Powers' ranch, a frequent site for Colorado Springs Republican fundraisers.

Bruce also ran unsuccessfully for the Colorado State Senate in 2000, losing a hotly contested Republican party primary to Ron May in the solidly Republican district. Running with the slogan "Ron May, but Bruce will," Bruce faced institutional opposition from statewide Republican leaders, including Governor Bill Owens, who had once supported Bruce's TABOR initiatives. May ultimately won by only 112 votes.

=== El Paso County commissioner ===
==== 2004 election ====
Bruce sought election to the El Paso County, Colorado, county commission in 2004, winning the Republican Party nomination by defeating Colorado Springs councilwoman Maraget Radford in the party primary. In the general election, Bruce defeated Democrat Stanley Hildahl and two Republicans who ran as write-in candidates with the backing of some party leaders. Bruce won the general election with 58% of the vote. Bruce self-funded his campaign, refusing to accept outside donations.

==== Policy positions ====
While serving on the El Paso County Commission, Bruce was frequently the only opposition to measures supported by the other four county commissioners. He cast the only vote against implementing mail ballot elections, against county interference in the proposed incorporation of Falcon, Colorado (although he also opposed the incorporation), against a package of road improvement projects recommended by the Colorado Department of Transportation, against the appointment of County Administrator Jeff Greene, against stricter building codes for mobile homes, and against awarding a county grant to an anti-poverty agency, calling it handouts for "deadbeats."

He was unsuccessful in attempting to reduce the number of paid holidays taken by county employees, but was instrumental in lowering property tax rates and in negotiating the expansion of a gravel pit operation. He also spoke in favor of turning over management of the county fair to a volunteer organization and called for the number of volunteer boards and commissions to be reduced. Bruce was also outspoken in support of deportation for illegal immigrants, and went against his normal practice of refusing to support ceremonial resolutions to support a resolution in favor of the creation of an Immigration and Customs Enforcement office in El Paso County.

==== Conflicts with county staff and commissioners ====
When Bruce joined the commission, he sought to have his salary of over $60,000 per year directed to charity, per a campaign promise. Designating Active Citizens Together, an educational non-profit he helped found, as the recipient, Bruce sought to have the county not withhold income tax from his checks, as the money would go directly to charity and he would receive no direct personal benefit. After ten months of disputing arrangements with county staff, Bruce agreed to accept checks with taxes and deductions withheld. In 2007, Bruce attempted to use the non-profit group to donate copies of the U.S. Constitution for local school districts to distribute to graduating seniors; several districts refused his donation on logistical grounds or policies forbidding distribution of external material. The nonprofit group has purchased tens of thousands of copies of the constitution, with the goal of giving one to every graduating high school senior in Colorado.

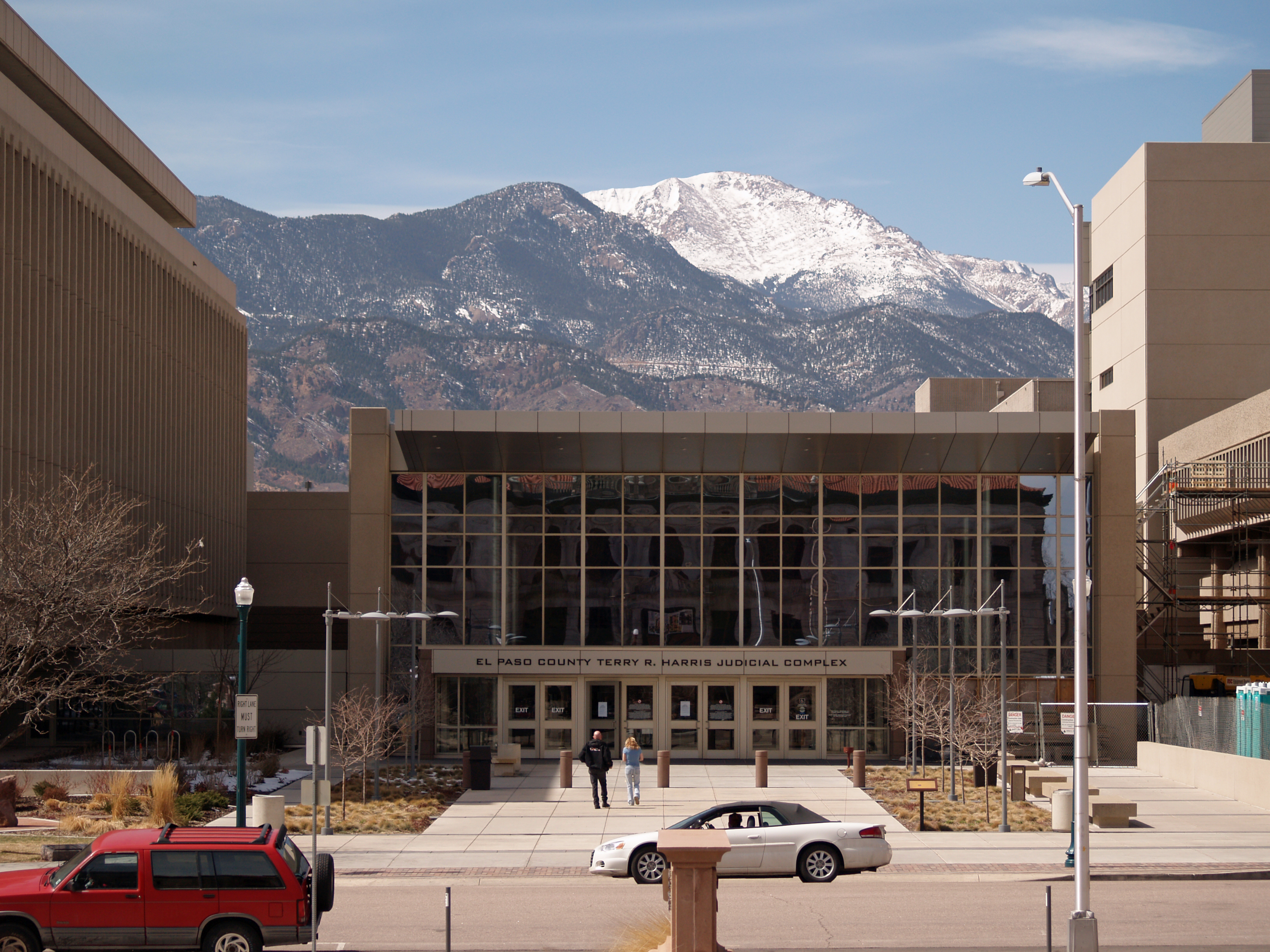
Because of his opposition the methods used to finance its construction, Douglas Bruce, as a county commissioner in 2005, objected to the placement of his name on a plaque marking county support of the El Paso County Terry R. Harris Judicial Complex. (pictured)

He also refused to accept a VIP pass from the Colorado Springs Airport, characterizing it as a "bribe;" he also objected to the introduction of public prayer during county commission meetings. Bruce also objected to the inclusion of his name (alongside other county commissioners) on a plaque marking county support of a new courthouse expansion, threatening to physically remove his name from the plaque; his opposition to financing methods for the courthouse had been a driving factor behind his 2004 county commission campaign.

Bruce's debating and speaking style during county commission meetings led to occasional conflicts with county staff and other commissioners. During his first year, an escalating series of disputes with Commissioner Sallie Clark led to her ruling, at a meeting which she chaired, that Bruce was not allowed to discuss Colorado Springs city politics. In 2006, Bruce was also accused of intervening in a county bidding process for a copying contract in favor of a campaign supporter.

In 2006, El Paso County Attorney Bill Louis denounced Bruce as a "narcissist, sociopath and crackpot enabler" for supporting Colorado's Amendment 38, a referendum designed to ease rules for petitioning measures onto election ballots. Bruce and Louis verbally tangled after Louis called Bruce's tactics "guerrilla" and Louis announced: "I plan to do everything in my limited power to make sure that [Bruce's tenure in elected office] comes to an end at some point for the good not only of this community but for all of Colorado and the nation."

Tensions also rose during Bruce's final weeks on the county commission, as he sought a vacancy committee's appointment to the state legislature. Bruce criticized county staff for being unresponsive to his inquiries, and Sheriff Terry Maketa responded by accusing Bruce of harming the morale of county staff, and told Bruce that he supported his bid for the legislature in order "to put you in an environment that will match your ineffectiveness," a statement applauded by other county staff. During his final commission meetings, Bruce was also repeatedly cut off by other commissioners during his comments; other members of the commission described his behavior as an increase in "grandstanding" prior to the vacancy committee's meeting.

=== Activism in Colorado Springs ===
In June 2000, Bruce was called to appear as a potential juror for a sexual assault trial in Colorado Springs. During the jury selection process, Bruce distributed leaflets written by the Fully Informed Jury Association in support of jury nullification. After defense attorneys objected to Bruce's actions, the presiding judge dismissed Bruce and 50 other potential jurors who had received the fliers, resulting in a two-week delay for the trial.

Bruce authored two measures, Issues 200 and 201, which appeared on the November 2006 Colorado Springs election ballot, and would have reduced the city's sales tax rate, eliminated its property tax, and restricted the city's ability to borrow money. The legality of the measures was challenged by city officials; the dispute rose to the Colorado Court of Appeals, which ruled in favor of the measures' placement on the ballot. Bruce also unsuccessfully contested both the editing of statements of support for the measures in ballot summaries mailed to voters, and what he claimed was deceptive wording in other taxation measures that election.

Bruce was also the subject of several criminal citations — first in May 2006, stemming from charges that he campaigned against a tax increase for the Falcon Fire Protection District at a polling place closer than the legal 100-foot (30 m) limit, and then in August 2009, when he and another man were charged with trespassing after being asked by police to stop soliciting signatures outside a Costco for the second time in a year. Bruce alleged that the City of Colorado Springs attempted to "bully" him and violate his First Amendment rights, a charge city officials denied. A trial was eventually held after paperwork errors, a tainted jury pool, and claims by Bruce of selective prosecution; after a three-day trial, both were acquitted. Bruce later filed an unsuccessful complaint alleging professional misconduct by the case's prosecutor and judge.

=== Colorado House of Representatives ===
==== Appointment, swearing-in, and censure ====
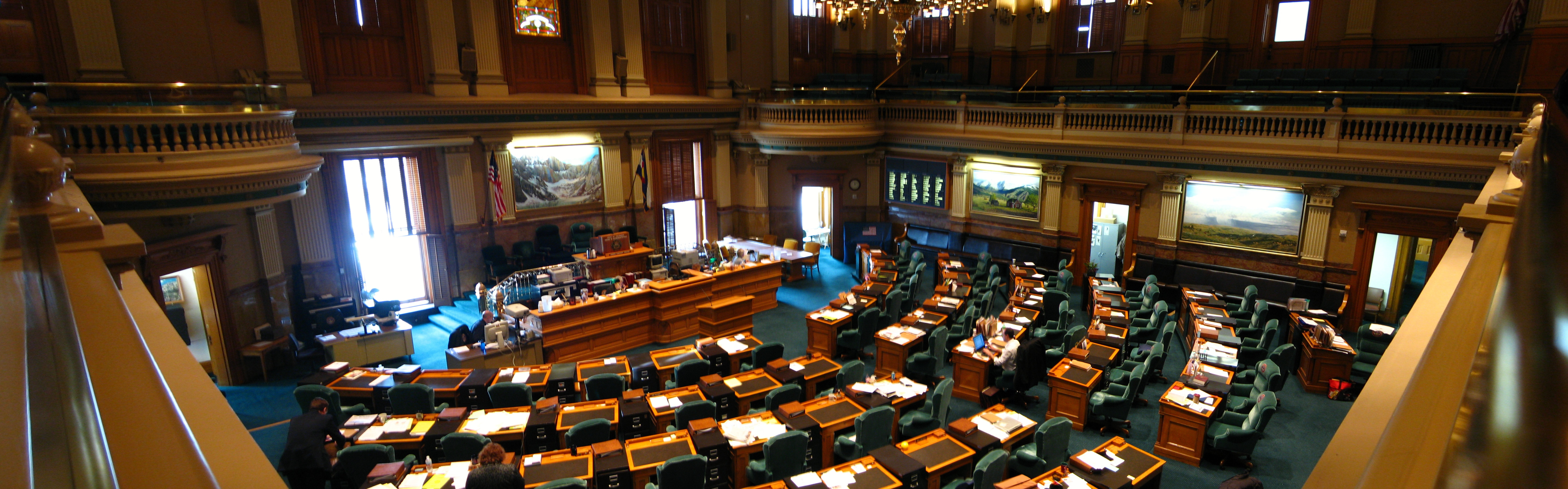
On the morning before being sworn in, Bruce kicked a Rocky Mountain News photographer while on the floor of the Colorado House of Representatives (pictured). For this action, Bruce became the first legislator in Colorado history to be officially censured.

In October 2007, Bruce was chosen over two other Republican contenders for the state house seat vacated by Rep. Bill Cadman in District 15, following a short but contentious battle for the appointment. Bruce received two-thirds of the votes from the 66-member vacancy committee. Although eligible to be sworn in immediately after his appointment was certified, Bruce postponed the oath of office in order to be eligible to serve a full four terms beyond the partial term under Colorado's term limits rules, an action which was criticized by both Republican and Democratic lawmakers. His delay led to the enactment of legislation requiring legislators to be sworn in within 14 days of their selection. Bruce cast the only dissenting vote on the measure.

Bruce also demanded to be sworn in in front of the full house, a request denied by both Republican and Democratic leadership. He acquiesced to an individual swearing-in ceremony on January 14 after House Republicans voted 22-1 to call for a representative to be named for District 15 if Bruce did not take the oath of office by the end of the day.

On the morning before he was sworn in, Bruce kicked a Rocky Mountain News photographer who took Bruce's picture during the prayer; Bruce accused the photographer of "violating the order and decorum" of the house, and refused to apologize, describing his action instead as a "nudge or a tap." A six-member legislative panel recommended 6-0 that Bruce be censured by the House for his actions. On January 24, the full House of Representatives voted 62-1 to censure Bruce. He became the first representative in the recorded history of the state house to be formally censured.

==== Legislative agenda ====
For the 2008 session of the Colorado General Assembly, Bruce was named to seats on the House Finance Committee and the House State, Veterans, and Military Affairs Committee. Bruce was similarly critical of the proposed state budget debated during the 2008 legislative session; however, his budget amendment proposals were unsuccessful.

All of the legislation introduced by Bruce died in House committees, including proposals to distribute copies and require instruction on the Declaration of Independence and U.S. Constitution to high school seniors, to prohibit counties from assessing any charges other than property taxes on property tax bills, to raise legislative pay and index pay to inflation, and to create a bipartisan panel to draw up Colorado's congressional and legislative districts.

Bruce routinely objected to the practice of attaching a "safety clause" to bills, the inclusion of which declares the bill as "necessary for the immediate preservation of the public peace, health or safety," enacting it into law sooner and prohibiting challenges to the legislation via the petition process. He offered amendments to a number of bills to remove the safety clause, which often failed on account of legislators' personal hostility towards him; however, in 2008, 41% of bills passed had no safety clause, up from 25% the previous year. Bruce also opposed proposals to raise signature requirements for citizen-initiated constitutional amendments, and opposed a bill to impose new requirements on landlords, despite criticism that voting on the measure constituted a conflict of interest.

==== Removal from committee ====
Consistent with Bruce's practice as a county commissioner, Bruce opposed ceremonial resolutions in the legislature, and on February 13, was the lone legislator who refused to sign on as a cosponsor to a resolution recognizing Military and Veterans Appreciation Day. Other Republican legislators denounced Bruce in a public letter for "callous indifference" towards veterans, and Republican Minority Leader Mike May removed Bruce from the House State, Veterans and Military Affairs Committee. Bruce offered as evidence of his support for veterans his successful amendment to a house bill to include interest in a state repayment to the Colorado Veterans Trust Fund, a move which resulted in an additional $636,000 repaid to the fund. Bruce would later cite this as one of his major accomplishments during the 2008 session.

==== "Illiterate peasants" comments ====
On April 21, 2008, Bruce voiced opposition during house debate on a bill sponsored by Rep. Marsha Looper (R) to create a guest worker program to facilitate temporary employment visas for agricultural workers from Mexico. After speaking against illegal immigration and being advised to restrict comments to the bill by debate chair Rep. Kathleen Curry, Bruce took the floor a second time and commented:

I would like to have the opportunity to state at the microphone why I don't think we need 5,000 more illiterate peasants in Colorado.

Bruce was immediately gavelled to order by Rep. Kathleen Curry, who ruled that he would no longer be recognized during debate on the bill. Bruce's comments were denounced by legislators on both sides of the aisle, as well the Mexican consulate in Denver. Bruce proudly defended his remarks as being factually accurate, citing dictionary definitions of "illiterate" and "peasant." Legislators responded to Bruce's propensity for generating controversy by declaring that they would "start ignoring him." The following weekend, Bruce's comments were the target of a local protest in Colorado Springs.

==== 2008 election ====
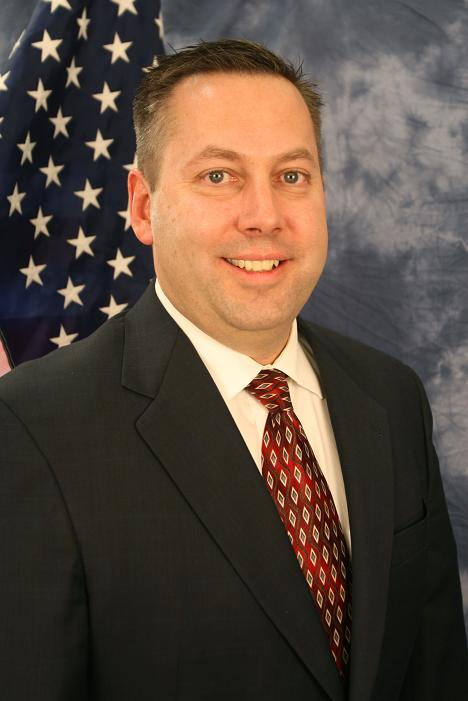
Attorney and Air Force veteran Mark Waller (pictured) defeated Bruce for the 2008 Republican Party nomination for the state house.

Bruce announced in November 2007 that he would stand in the 2008 general election for the House District 15 seat. He faced a challenge for the Republican nomination from attorney and Iraq War veteran Mark Waller. Bruce funded his own campaign with over $30,000 of personal funds, refusing to accept private campaign donations; Waller, however, received endorsements or contributions from at least five sitting state representatives, and Colorado Attorney General John Suthers. Waller received 57% of the vote at the Republican assembly in March, claiming the top line on the August Republican primary ballot; he did not differ publicly with Bruce on political positions, but argued that Bruce's temperament caused him to be an ineffective legislator.

Both Bruce and Waller accused each other of inappropriate conduct while campaigning; Bruce was accused of inappropriately distributing campaign flyers to Republican representatives on the House floor, of mailing flyers promoting his charity shortly before the primary, and of inappropriately listing endorsements on his web site. In turn, Bruce filed several campaign finance complaints against Waller, one of which resulted in Waller's campaign being fined for failing to properly disclose a campaign contribution. Ultimately, Bruce was defeated for the Republican nomination in the August 12 party primary, taking 48 percent of the vote to Waller's 52 percent.

=== Later career ===
==== Colorado Springs ====
In 2007, Bruce began a series of challenges to the City of Colorado Springs' creation of a Stormwater Enterprise Fee, which he contended amounted to an illegal tax collected by a government entity. After his first attempt at a ballot measure to end the fee was held to violate Colorado's single subject rule, Bruce gained permission for a second petition following a year-long battle over wording, and placed the measure on the November 2008 ballot following struggles to collect the necessary number of signatures but were rejected by voters.

Bruce was again successful at placing a measure targeting the Stormwater Enterprise on the ballot in 2009, despite challenges from the city that signatures were not submitted in time, but not after Bruce lost disputes over the wording of the ballot measures. Bruce's Issue 300 was passed by voters with about 55 percent of the vote, and mandated that enterprise payments to Colorado Springs be phased out over eight years. Bruce and city officials disputed, even before the election, as to whether his measure would apply to the city's Stormwater Enterprise Fee; and after threatening to launch a ballot initiative to cut property taxes after an initial 5-4 vote by the city council over two years, the city council then voted 5-4 to phase out the authority immediately. Bruce, however, objected to the city council's proposed implementation of the initiative, which would allow the city to collect payments from the authority in exchange for services rendered. Bruce claimed that this would "undo the plain meaning of issue 300," and made similar claims regarding a local government restructuring proposal made by Colorado Springs mayor Lionel Rivera.

In March 2010, Bruce filed suit against the city of Colorado Springs and its city council, charging that they had illegally hired outside legal counsel. He also accused the council members of receiving benefits greater than that authorized by law.

In June 2010, Bruce filed a ballot measure to dramatically expand the powers of the city's mayor, including eliminating the positions of city manager, chief financial officer, and communications staff, as well as giving the mayor power to veto ordinances, lower taxes, and excuse city code violations.

==== Statewide ballot measures ====
Although Bruce attempted to distance himself from three statewide ballot measures aimed at limiting Colorado governments' power to raise and borrow money, several petitioners for the measures were linked to Bruce through records showing that they temporarily resided at one of his Colorado Springs apartment buildings, and through their past work on TABOR initiatives in other states and petitioning for Bruce's Issue 300 in Colorado Springs. The three measures — Amendment 60, Amendment 61 and Proposition 101 — would impose restrictions or tax cuts, eliminate governments' ability to borrow money without voter approval, cut the state income tax from 4.63 to 3.5 percent, and eliminate vehicle ownership taxes.

Opponents of the ballot measures filed a complaint alleging the backers violated Colorado campaign finance laws by failing to disclose contributions and expenditures. Bruce was subpoenaed to testify in a hearing related to the case in March, but contested the summons unsuccessfully. During the month of May 2010, the state attempted 29 times to serve a notice of a court order testify to Bruce at his Colorado Springs residence; Bruce stated that he was out of town at the time, although both notices and delivered newspapers were removed during that period.

At a hearing in late May, one of the ballot measures' sponsors, Michelle Northrup, testified that she had met with Bruce before the measures were filed and that he provided advice on submitting the initiates and other legal matters. In early June, an administrative law judge ruled that the evidence showed Bruce was behind the three measures and imposed fines on their proponents, and state attorney general John Suthers' office stated that they would seek a contempt citation against Bruce in district court.

=== Crime, trial, conviction and sentence ===
In 2010, Bruce was charged with money laundering, attempted bribery of a public official, and tax fraud, after he was discovered to be using a small-government charity he founded to hide millions of dollars from the Colorado Department of Revenue, pocketing interest and using the revenue to fund his political activism. The case went to trial during which Bruce acted as his own attorney. During the trial, Bruce showed up late to proceedings and introduced evidence by throwing documents onto the floor. After eight days of trial, on December 22, 2011, jurors convicted Bruce on four counts. On February 13, 2012, he was sentenced to two consecutive 90-day jail terms and six months of probation, during which he would have to make extensive financial disclosures to the court aimed to ensure he did not become a repeat offender. Bruce was also ordered to pay around $21,000 to cover the cost of prosecution, and about $29,000 to cover the taxes that were owed. Bruce defiantly denounced the trial, saying, "This was the dirtiest trial I have seen in 38 years, regardless of the outcome."

Bruce began serving his sentence February 17, 2012. He spent 104 days in jail, and was paroled under 20 terms and conditions. After a year, the probation department of the Denver District Court brought two complaints against Bruce, claiming that he failed to submit financial disclosures and tax filings, did not disclose a financial deal with Colorado Springs Councilwoman Helen Collins, and did not report code violations and court cases related to six personal properties in Ohio, Wisconsin and Illinois.

On March 11, 2016, Bruce was found in violation of his probation and sentenced to two years. He served his sentence in several locations, including the Colorado Territorial Correctional Facility in Cañon City, Colorado and Delta, Colorado. On July 28, 2016, Bruce appeared before the Colorado State Board of Parole, where he was granted parole on his eligibility date of September 3, 2016. Bruce was quoted as saying "I accept responsibility for all my actions. I deeply regret them. It will never happen again."
