= Bob Gardner =

American politician (born 1954)

Robert S. Gardner
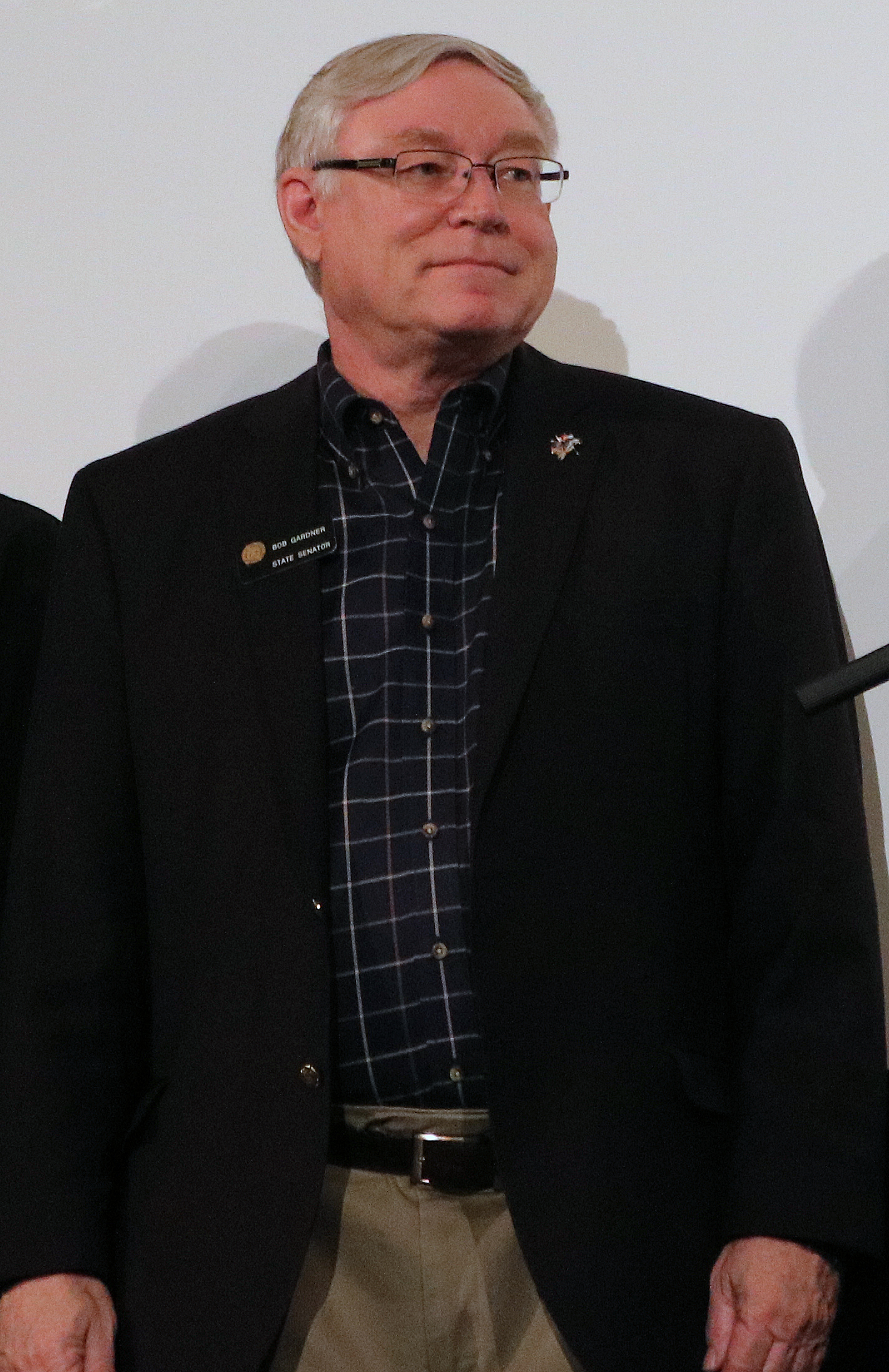
- Gardner in 2019

Member of the Colorado Senate from the 12th district
- In office January 11, 2017 – January 8, 2025
- Preceded by: Bill Cadman
- Succeeded by: Marc Snyder

Member of the Colorado House of Representatives from the 20th district
- In office January 12, 2011 – January 7, 2015
- Preceded by: Amy Stephens
- Succeeded by: Terri Carver

Member of the Colorado House of Representatives from the 21st district
- In office January 10, 2007 – January 12, 2011
- Preceded by: Keith King
- Succeeded by: Lois Landgraf

Personal details
- Born: 1953 or 1954 (age 72–73)
- Party: Republican
- Spouse: LeAnn Gardner (divorced)
- Children: 2
- Education: United States Air Force Academy; University of Texas (JD); George Washington University Law School (LLM)
- Profession: Retired Air Force officer; attorney

Robert S. Gardner (born 1953 or 1954) is a former legislator in the U.S. state of Colorado. A United States Air Force veteran and attorney, Gardner was elected to the Colorado House of Representatives as a Republican in 2006. From 2006 to 2012, he represented House District 21, which encompasses western El Paso County and northeastern Fremont County.

In the 2016 general election, Gardner was elected to represent Senate District 12.

On January 9, 2024, Gardner announced that he was running for United States House of Representatives Colorado 5th Congressional District in the 2024 elections, replacing retiring Congressman Doug Lamborn.

== Biography ==
Gardner graduated from the United States Air Force Academy in 1976, and served as a missile launch officer in the Air Force. While an Air Force officer, Gardner earned a J.D. from the University of Texas in 1981 with honors and a L.L.M. from George Washington University Law School in 1986, specializing in government procurement law. After earning his law degree, Gardner served in the Judge Advocate General's Corps. He also taught procurement and business law as a member of the Air Force Academy law faculty.

After leaving active duty in 1989 at the rank of lieutenant colonel, Gardner became an attorney in private practice, specializing in government contract law, representing public contractors and charter schools. He served on the board of Cheyenne Mountain Charter Academy, which he helped found, from 1994 to 1997 and on the board of the Colorado League of Charter Schools Legal Advocacy Fund. He continues to operate a private law practice in Colorado Springs, Colorado, specializing in government affairs and contracts, business and commercial law, and campaign and election law. The law firm website is www.rsglaw.net.

Gardner is divorced; he has two adult children: Bob Jr. and Laura.

=== Political activism ===
From 1993 to 1997, Gardner served as chair of the El Paso County Republican Party and was involved in numerous candidate and issue campaigns in the Colorado Springs area.

In 1999, Gardner was treasurer for the Colorado Springs Safety Association, a group opposing a ballot measure to grant police and fire personnel collective bargaining powers.

Gardner registered the political committee Citizens for Honest Government to oppose a slate of candidates during Colorado Springs' 2001 city council elections, and distributed fliers critical of four candidates; he was threatened with arrest following a dispute with a deputy city clerk regarding distributing flyers near an early voting site at city hall.

Gardner helped coordinate campaigns for a slate of "reform" candidates for Colorado Springs School District 11 in 2003 who backed school vouchers.

He played a prominent role in the formation in 2004 of Citizens for Student Achievement and Progress, a local political committee formed to support "education reform candidates and issues" in El Paso County, In 2005, he was a spokesperson for the Colorado branch of All Children Matter, a national political group supporting school choice.

In 2004, Gardner worked on the campaign for a local ballot measure to increase taxes to support The Resource Exchange, a nonprofit serving people with developmental disabilities. During the campaign, he submitted, for anonymous publication in voter guides, statements opposing the tax increase including: "The families of people with mental retardation, [should] not expect the government to help," and "By funding programs to care for these children, we are encouraging irresponsibility." Others working on the campaign justified the statements as a campaign tactic designed to stir support for the tax measure.

Gardner was also a spokesman and campaign manager for Ed Jones's successful campaign for the Colorado State Senate in 2002, and his unsuccessful reelection campaign against Democratic challenger John Morse in 2006.

During Jones' 2002 campaign, he called for an internal investigation of a police officer who told to news media that Jones had been seen at a bar where drugs were known to be sold. Gardner was also co-manager of Sen. Ron May's re-election campaign in 2004. and has served as attorney for local Republican candidates on multiple occasions.

Gardner was also involved in the contested Republican primary for Colorado's 5th congressional district that year, supporting Jeff Crank over victor Doug Lamborn. During the general election, Gardner filed a complaint against Lamborn, accusing his campaign of coordinating illegally with 527 organizations. The complaint was referenced in attack ads by Lamborn's Democratic opponent, and Gardner withdrew it shortly before the general election. Lamborn was cleared of wrongdoing by the Federal Election Commission.

== Legislative career ==
=== 2006 election ===
In 2006, Gardner sought the house seat held by retiring Rep. Keith King; he faced no opposition for the Republican nomination. Gardner won his seat in the Colorado House of Representatives in the 2006 general election, defeating Democrat Anna Lord with about 59% of the popular vote.

=== 2007 legislative session ===
During the 2007 session of the Colorado General Assembly, Gardner sat on the House Judiciary Committee and the House Local Government Committee. The newly elected Rep. Bob Gardner joined Rep. Cory Gardner in the state house, leading to the need to distinguish them as "Gardner, B." and "Gardner, C." in house roll calls. During his first session, Gardner was noted for his passionate speeches on the House floor.

Gardner proposed legislation to increase driver's license fees by $1 to fund an audit of driver's license office performance. After the bill was defeated in committee, Gardner led a bipartisan effort to request the Legislative Audit Committee to investigate the matter. Gardner also unsuccessfully proposed legislation to ease restrictions on petition circulators.

Gardner introduced legislation — passed and signed into law — to provide a full-time judge for Fremont County and to require that victims of crimes be informed of attempts by offenders to overturn convictions or halt sex offender registration.

Following the legislative session, Gardner served on the legislature's interim committee on Long-Term Care Health Care Services and Support to Persons with Developmental Disabilities.

In November 2007, Gardner, along with Rep. Amy Stephens was named Greater Colorado Springs Chamber of Commerce legislator of the year.

=== 2008 legislative session ===
In the 2008 session of the Colorado General Assembly, Gardner sat on the House Finance Committee, and the House State, Veterans, and Military Affairs Committee.

Gardner was among those who criticized Democratic Governor Bill Ritter, a Democrat, for signing an executive order allowing state employees collective bargaining rights.

In response, Gardner introduced a bill that would have prohibited all public employees in Colorado from striking; his bill was voted down in committee, but a narrower measure prohibiting state employees from striking advanced. Gardner unsuccessfully attempted to add some of his bill's stiffer penalties for striking into the competing measure, which was signed into law by Gov. Ritter.

Gardner also proposed a legislative package designed to assist Coloradoans with developmental disabilities. To address backlog in provision of state services, Gardner proposed an $8.6 million increase in funding to reduce the waiting list; Ritter similarly supported a $10.6 increase in funding. Gardner's proposal, which would have directed 2 percent of annual budget increases to services for the developmentally disabled, won the endorsement of an interim legislative committee. During the legislative session, the bill passed a House committee after being pared down to a $2 million increase for the following fiscal year. Gardner proposed giving state preference in contracts to companies that employ developmentally disabled individuals and was the house sponsor of a Senate bill to create a state employment program for the developmentally disabled. Following the legislative session, Gardner was named "Legislator of the Year" by Alliance, a group serving people with developmental disabilities.

Gardner proposed legislation to create a college scholarship program for low-income students, and a bill to guarantee tuition rates for four-year college students, which died in a House committee. A measure to grant immunity to parole board members acting in their official capacity was passed by the state house. A bill to require certain sex offenders to wear GPS monitoring bracelets during parole passed a house committee unanimously, but was passed over for funding in the state budget.

Gardner proposed a state constitutional change that would deny bail to illegal immigrants arrested for some felonies and serious drunk driving offenses. The measure was not passed by the legislature, but Gardner pledged during his re-election campaign to re-introduce it in the 2009 session.

=== 2008 election ===
During the contested 2008 Republican presidential primaries, Gardner supported former Massachusetts Gov. Mitt Romney. Gardner himself sought a second term in the legislature, again facing Democrat Anna Lord.

Gardner's re-election bid was endorsed by the Denver Post, while the Colorado Springs Independent endorsed his Democratic opponent. During the final weeks of the campaign, Lord accused Gardner of conflicts of interest because of his law firm's focus on lobbying, government contracts, and policy formation. In response, Gardner stated that Lord's accusations approached the legal threshold of slander. Gardner ultimately won re-election, taking 58 percent of the popular vote.

Following his re-election, Gardner was nominated for the post of House Minority Caucus Whip, but lost the caucus' vote for the post to Rep. Cory Gardner (no relation).

=== 2009 legislative session ===
For the 2009 legislative session, Gardner was named to seats on the House Appropriations Committee and the House Judiciary Committee. During the 2009 session, Gardner introduced legislation to allow all Colorado counties to levy sales tax, a power previously only held by home rule counties. The bill was weakened from its original form to mandate new reporting by the Department of Revenue, taking a step towards its original purpose.

Gardner led Republican opposition to legislation to create designated beneficiary agreements, calling them "de facto civil unions", and to legislation strengthening regulations on oil and gas drilling, and to Colorado joining the National Popular Vote Interstate Compact.

In May 2009, Gardner was the commencement speaker at Florence High School's graduation.

== 2018 Legislative Session ==
In 2018, Senator Gardner, in his second year in his first term as Senator from Colorado Springs, carried a wide variety of Legislation. He is the Chairman of the Senate Judiciary Committee, and serves on four other committees including the Committee on Legal Services, where he draws on his experience as “a simple country lawyer” as he likes to say when speaking from the well.

Among the bills of which he was the prime sponsor, he ran Senate Bill 273 which would have allowed seniors to receive a senior property tax exemption even when the senior home owner is required to move to a different location due to health issues.

Senate Bill 262 provided targeted funding for institutions of higher education; Senate Bill 252 adjusts the way competency is determined in criminal cases; and Senate Bill 15, the Protecting Homeowners and Deployed Military Act, alters the way a person can be removed from a property when they have no authority to be on the property.
