= Lois Landgraf =

American politician (1952–2026)

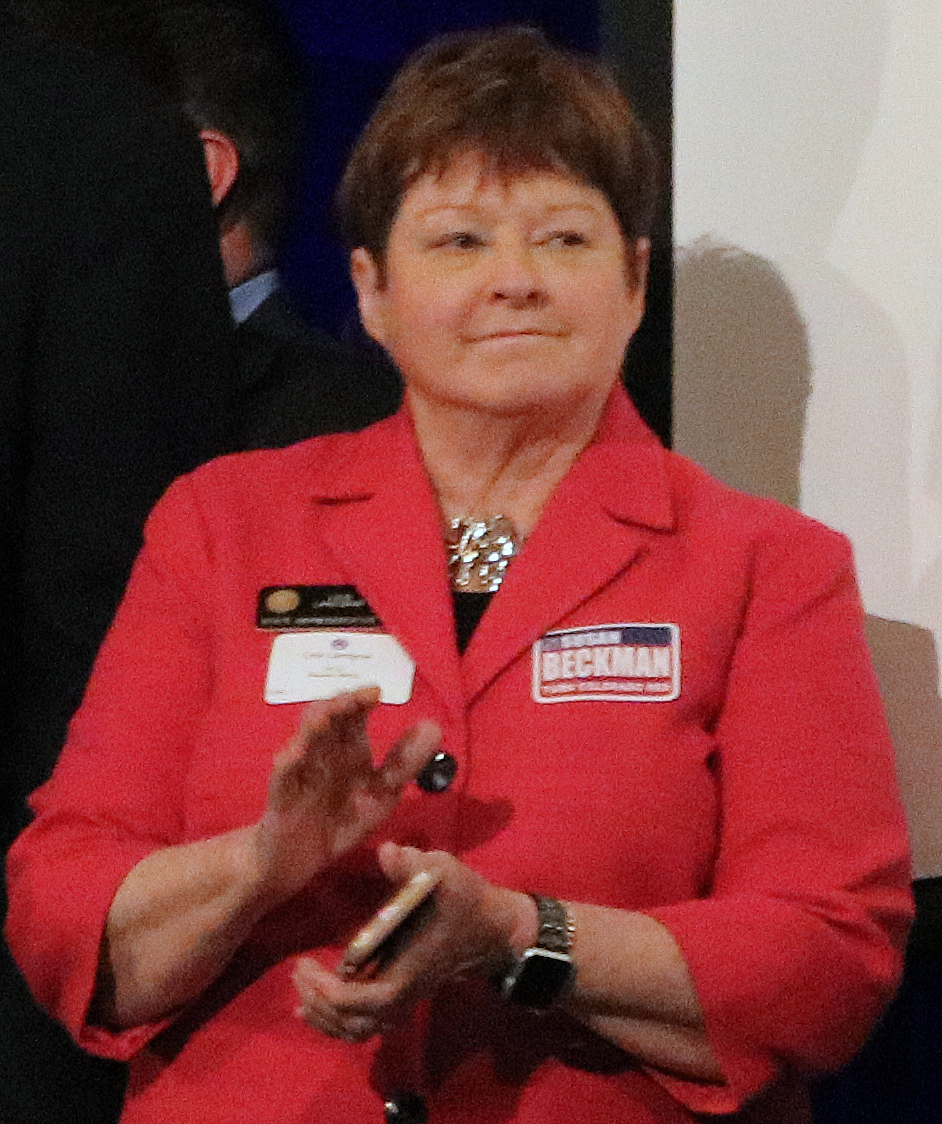
- Landgraf in 2019

Member of the Colorado House of Representatives from the 21st district
- In office January 9, 2013 – January 13, 2021
- Preceded by: Bob Gardner
- Succeeded by: Mary Bradfield

Personal details
- Born: March 16, 1952 Chula Vista, California, U.S.
- Died: June 1, 2026 (aged 74) Colorado Springs, Colorado, U.S.
- Party: Republican
- Education: University of Maryland (BS); University of Washington (MBA)
- Website: loislandgraf.us

Lois Landgraf (March 16, 1952 – June 1, 2026) was an American politician who was a Republican member of the Colorado House of Representatives. She represented District 21 from January 9, 2013, to January 13, 2021.

== Life and career ==
Landgraf was born in Chula Vista, California, on March 16, 1952. She earned her bachelor's degree in science from the University of Maryland and her MBA from the University of Washington.

Landgraf died in Colorado Springs, Colorado, on June 1, 2026, at the age of 74.

== Elections ==
- 2012 With District 21 incumbent Republican Representative Bob Gardner redistricted to District 20, Landgraf won the June 26, 2012 Republican Primary with 2,293 votes (60.4%); and won the three-way November 6, 2012 General election with 13,707 votes (65.7%) against Libertarian candidate Laticia Burns and American Constitution candidate Sean Halstead.
