= Dave Williams (Colorado politician) =

American politician (born 1986)

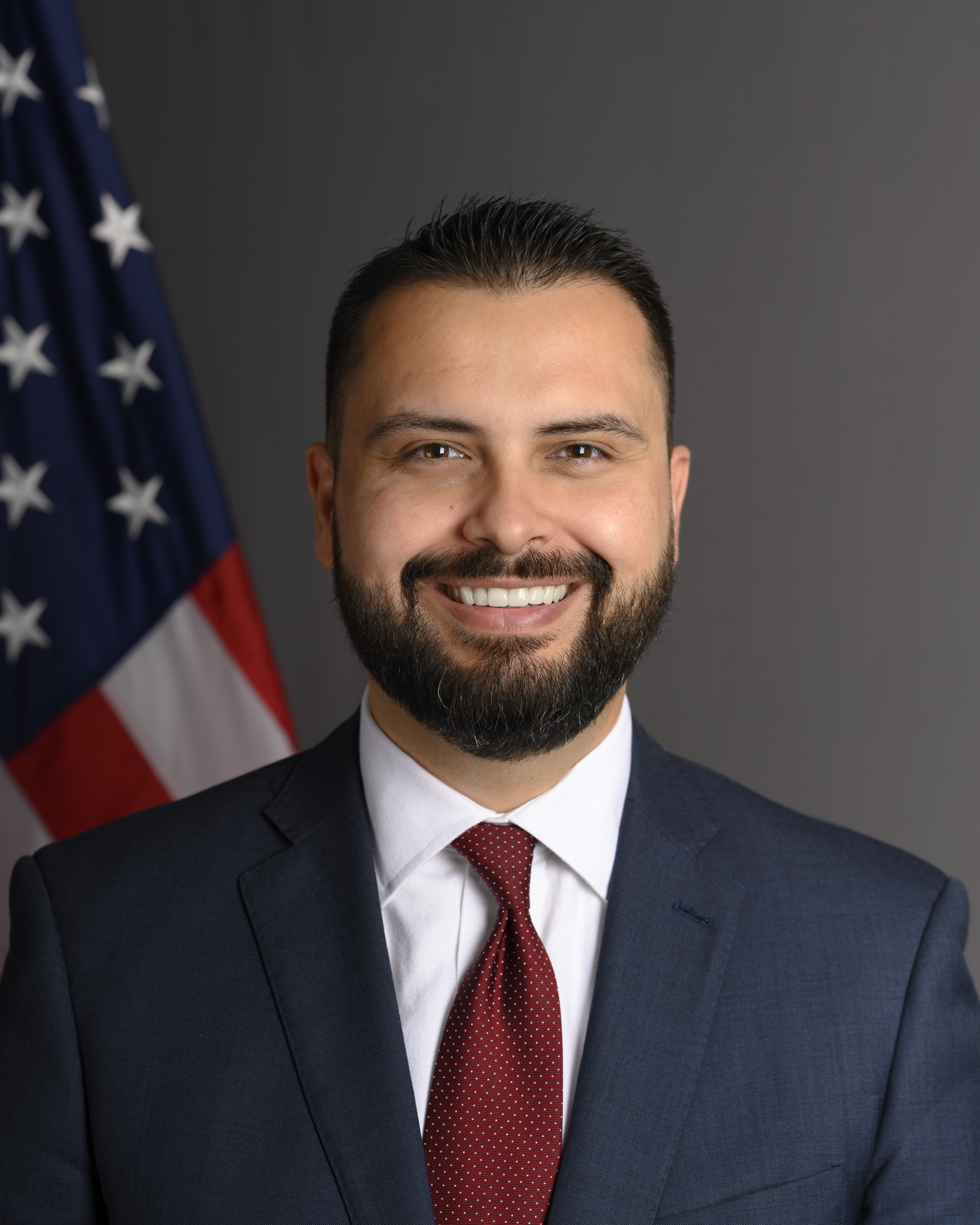

Senior Official in the Office to Monitor and Combat Trafficking in Persons
- In office April 20, 2026 – October 13, 2026
- Preceded by: Cindy Dyer (as Ambassador-at-Large)
- Succeeded by: Barbera Thornhill (as Ambassador-at-Large)

Chair of the Colorado Republican Party
- In office March 11, 2023 – March 29, 2025 (Note: Eli Bremer was elected as chair of the state party by the party’s central committee. However, a lawsuit in El Paso County, Colorado lead to the results being overturned and thus Williams has remained the party’s chair.)
- Preceded by: Kristi Burton Brown
- Succeeded by: Brita Horn

Member of the Colorado House of Representatives from the 15th district
- In office January 11, 2017 – January 9, 2023
- Preceded by: Gordon Klingenschmitt
- Succeeded by: Scott Bottoms

Personal details
- Born: David Alan Williams; July 20, 1986 (age 40) Albuquerque, New Mexico, U.S.
- Party: Republican
- Education: University of Colorado, Colorado Springs (BA)
- Website: Campaign website

David Alan Williams (born July 20, 1986) is an American far-right politician from Colorado Springs, Colorado, who previously served as the chair of the Colorado Republican Party from 2023 until 2025. He formerly represented Colorado House of Representatives District 15 from 2017 to 2023, which encompassed Colorado Springs and Cimarron Hills in El Paso County.

Williams was a candidate for Colorado's 5th congressional district in the 2024 elections, running to replace the retiring Doug Lamborn. He lost the primary election to Republican Jeff Crank.

== Early life ==
Between 2008 and 2020 Williams was a vice president of logistics for MKW Global, a family business.

== Political career ==
=== State House ===
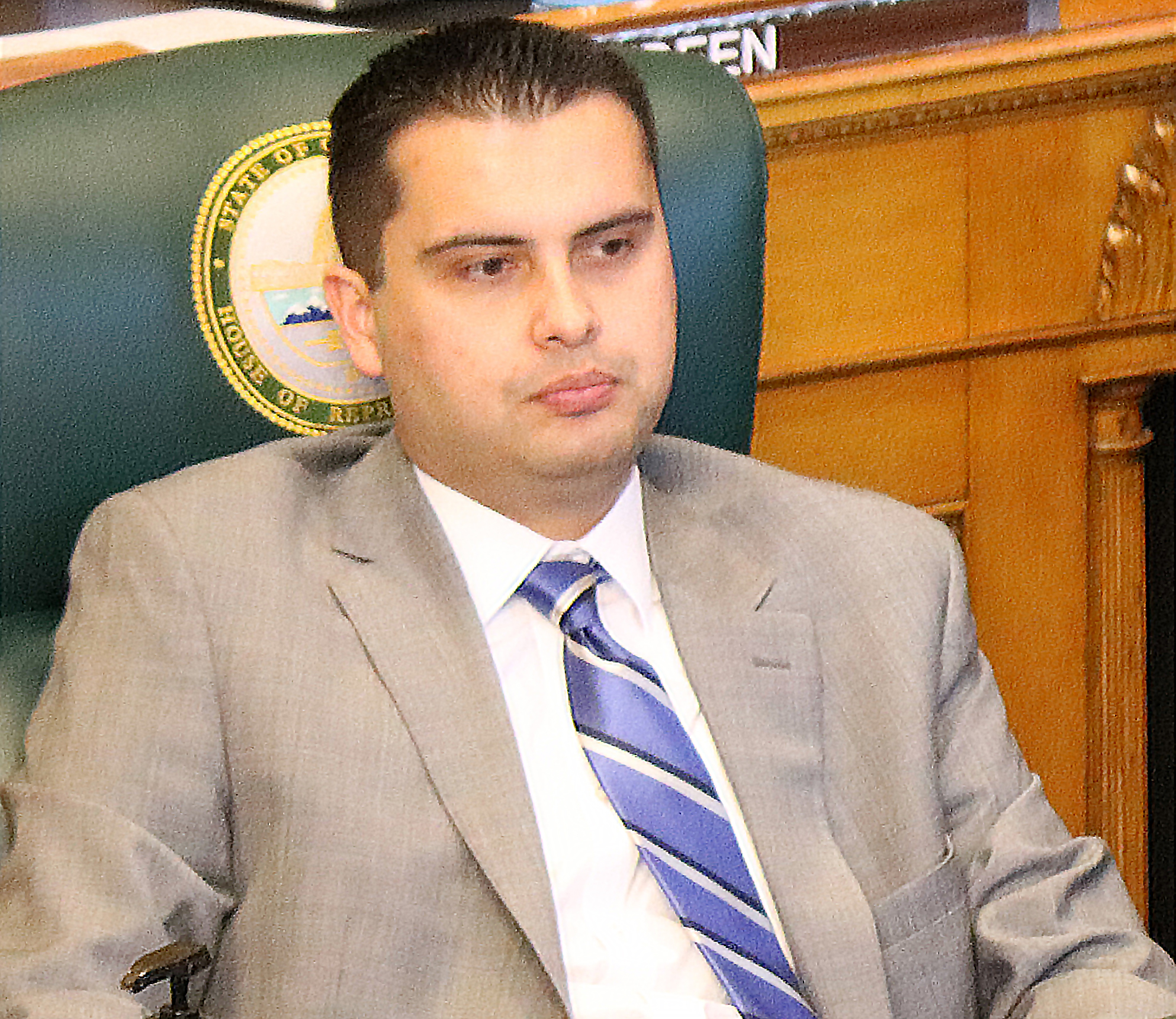
Williams in the Colorado House of Representatives

Williams was first elected to the State House in 2016 after winning 67.8% of the vote.

Williams was the first Latino elected to House District 15. His mother's maiden name is "Sanchez" and their family has roots going back to Mexico and Southern California.

On December 7, 2020, Williams and seven other Republicans requested to the Speaker of the House KC Becker that a committee be formed on "election integrity" to conduct an audit of the Dominion Voting Systems used in Colorado's 2020 elections in spite of no evidence of issues. The request was rejected, with Becker criticizing it as a promotion of "debunked conspiracy theories."

In July 2021, Williams and Ron Hanks held a town hall at Colorado Springs in which both made multiple claims of election fraud. Williams claimed that 5,600 dead people voted in the 2020 Colorado elections and that fraud played a role in Democrat John Hickenlooper's victory against Republican Cory Gardner.

During the 2022 legislative session, Williams and the majority of Republicans rejected a resolution passed by the state house meant to urge congress to pass voting right legislation. Williams proposed two failed amendments to the resolution which included calling for an audit of the 2020 election, thanking the pro-Trump rioters that stormed the Capitol and decertifying the election results in favor for Trump.

=== Chair of Colorado GOP ===
On March 11, 2023, Williams was elected chair of the Colorado Republican Party for a two-year term. Williams' position as chairman of the party has been controversial among several other Republicans. Under his leadership, the party has faced a significant loss of funding, and an increase in infighting.

In early June 2024, the Colorado GOP sent out a mass email signed by Dave Williams titled "God Hates Pride", and reading in part "The month of June has arrived and, once again, the godless groomers in our society want to attack what is decent, holy, and righteous so they can ultimately harm our children." The email message contained an image reading "God Hates Flags", which was widely viewed as a reference to the Westboro Baptist Church. Colorado Republican congressional candidate Valdamar Archuleta "renounced the GOP's endorsement as a result."

In 2024, the Colorado Republican Party called on parents to remove their children from public schools in Colorado, arguing that the schools "turn more kids trans.” The mailer and social media posts provoked widespread bipartisan condemnation, and triggered a crisis within the Colorado GOP. Log Cabin Republican Valdamar Archuleta renounced the party's endorsement of him in the Colorado's 1st congressional district election as a result. Aurora city counsellor Curtis Gardner renounced his affiliation with the Colorado GOP. The Jefferson County Republican Party, speaking on behalf of “numerous Colorado Republican County Chairs, other county party officers, members of the Colorado State Central Committee in all 64 Counties, and many Republican candidates” called for Dave Williams to resign immediately.

On August 24, 2024, Williams was removed as Colorado Republican Party chairman during a meeting in Brighton, Colorado. Then on September 25, 2024, a court invalidated this action, leaving Williams still the chairman.

Williams chose not to seek reelection in 2025, and was replaced by Brita Horn.

=== Congressional campaigns ===
In December 2021, Williams announced his campaign bid aimed at challenging Rep. Doug Lamborn. He attempted to get listed on the ballot as Dave "Let's Go Brandon" Williams, but this was rejected by Colorado Secretary of State Jena Griswold. In the 2022 Republican primary election for Colorado's 5th congressional district, incumbent representative Doug Lamborn defeated Williams and two other Republican Party challengers.

On January 8, 2024, Williams announced that he was again running for Colorado's 5th congressional district in the 2024 elections, running for the seat of retiring congressman Doug Lamborn. In March 2024, he was criticized by campaign opponents for MKW Global's importation of Chinese products during his tenure as vice president.

In June 2024, Williams lost the primary election for Colorado's 5th congressional district to Republican Jeff Crank. This race was characterized as a "battle" for the "soul" of the GOP in Colorado, with Williams representing the far-right, election-denying side of the party, and Crank representing the more traditional conservative version of the party.

=== U.S. State Department ===
In April 2026, President Donald Trump appointed Williams senior official in the Office to Monitor and Combat Trafficking in Persons until an ambassador-at-large could be confirmed. In October 2026, Los Angeles business leader and philanthropist Barbera Thornhill was confirmed by the US Senate as ambassador-at-large.

== Notes ==
Party political offices
Preceded by Kristi Burton Brown	Chair of the Colorado Republican Party; 2023–2025	Succeeded by Brita Horn
