= Colorado's 12th Senate district =

American legislative district

Colorado's 12th State Senate district
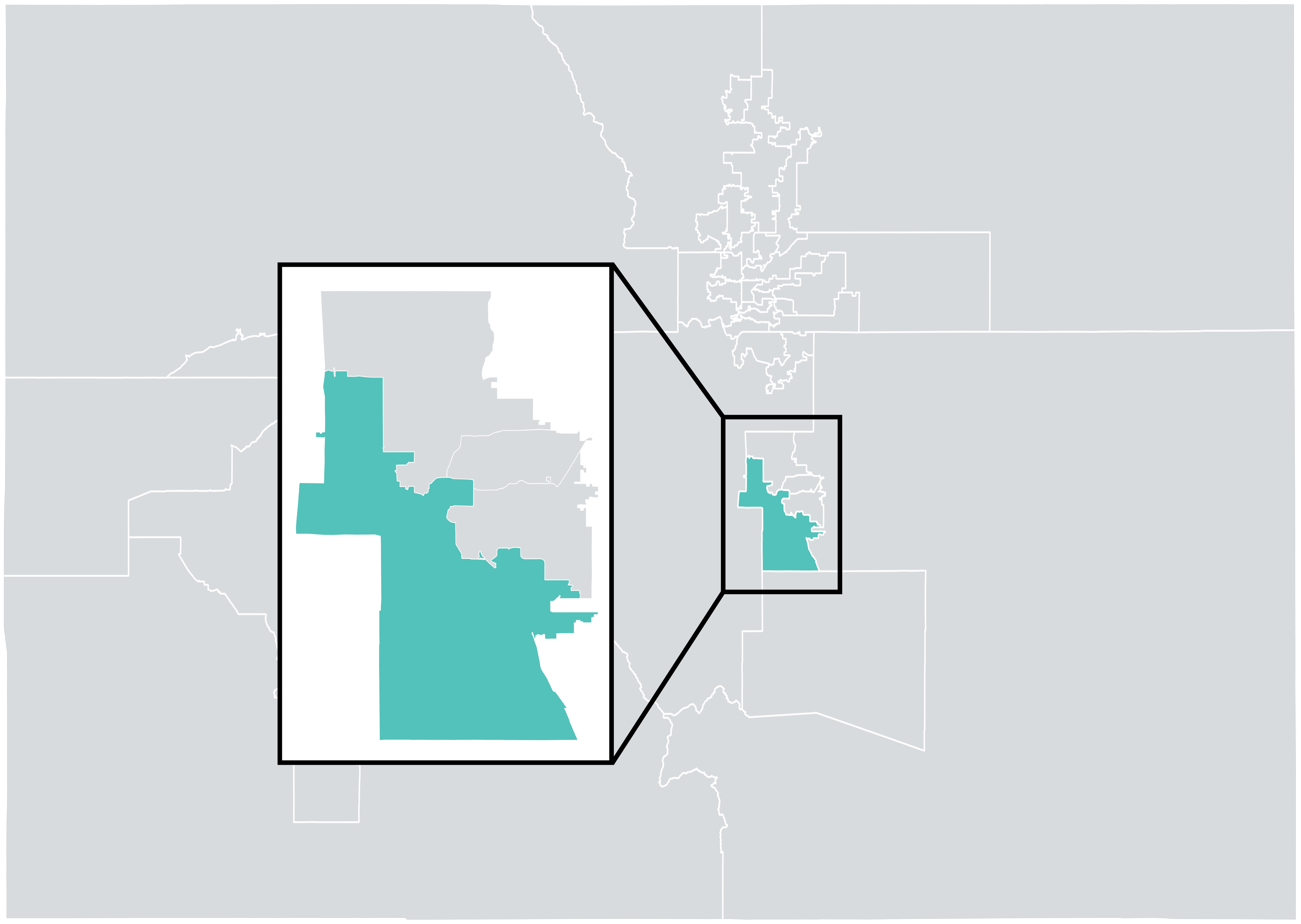
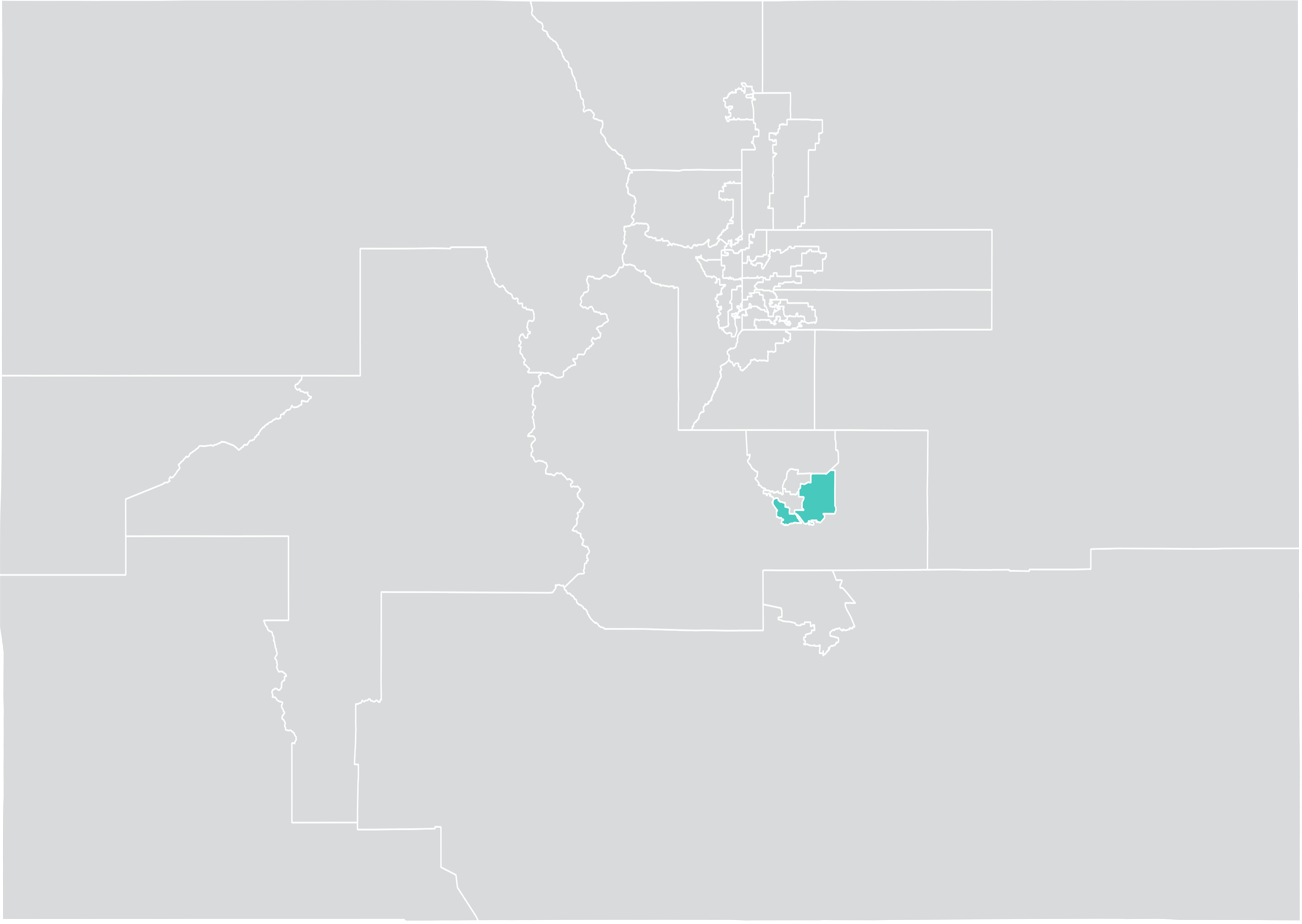
Senator
Marc Snyder; D–Colorado Springs
- Registration: 24.8% Republican; 20.6% Democratic; 51.9% No party preference
- Demographics: 68% White; 8% Black; 16% Hispanic; 3% Asian; 4% Other
- Population (2018): 162,195
- Registered voters: 103,694

Colorado's 12th Senate district is one of 35 districts in the Colorado Senate. It has been represented by Democrat Marc Snyder since January, 2025.

== Geography ==
District 12 is based in southern Colorado Springs in El Paso County, also covering the nearby communities of Cimarron Hills, Fort Carson, and parts of Security-Widefield, Falcon, and Stratmoor.

The district is located entirely within Colorado's 5th congressional district, and overlaps with the 15th, 16th, 17th, 18th, 19th, 20th, and 21st districts of the Colorado House of Representatives.

== Recent election results ==
Colorado Senators are elected to staggered four-year terms; under normal circumstances, the 12th district holds elections in presidential years.

=== 2024 ===
2024 Colorado Senate election, District 14
Party	Candidate	Votes	%
Democratic	Marc Snyder	36,971	48.90
Republican	Stan VanderWerf	35,872	47.45
Libertarian	John Michael Angle	2,755	3.64
Total votes		75,584	100
Democratic gain from Republican			

=== 2020 ===
2020 Colorado Senate election, District 12
Party	Candidate	Votes	%
Republican	Bob Gardner (incumbent)	45,808	58.3
Democratic	Electra Johnson	29,656	37.8
Libertarian	Zechariah Harris	3,048	3.9
Total votes		78,512	100
Republican hold			

=== 2016 ===
2016 Colorado Senate election, District 12
Primary election
Party	Candidate	Votes	%
Republican	Bob Gardner	8,243	61.8
Republican	Gordon Klingenschmitt	5,103	38.2
Total votes		13,346	100
General election
Republican	Bob Gardner	45,938	75.3
Libertarian	Manuel Quintel	15,071	24.7
Total votes		61,009	100
Republican hold			

=== 2012 ===
2012 Colorado Senate election, District 12
Party	Candidate	Votes	%
Republican	Bill Cadman (incumbent)	34,673	67.9
Libertarian	Dave Respecki	8,603	16.9
Constitution	James Michael Bristol	7,762	15.2
Total votes		51,038	100
Republican hold			

=== Federal and statewide results ===
Year	Office	Results
2020	President	Trump 53.7 – 42.4%
2018	Governor	Stapleton 55.8 – 39.4%
2016	President	Trump 56.9 – 33.4%
2014	Senate	Gardner 61.9 – 31.7%
2014	Governor	Beauprez 61.2 – 33.2%
2012	President	Romney 58.9 – 38.7%
