= Ron May (politician) =

American politician (born 1934)

Ronny J. "Ron" May

Member of the Colorado Senate from the 10th district
- In office January 10, 2001 – October 31, 2007
- Preceded by: Ray Powers
- Succeeded by: Bill Cadman

Member of the Colorado House of Representatives from the 15th district
- In office January 1993 – January 10, 2001
- Succeeded by: Bill Cadman

Personal details
- Born: September 16, 1934 (age 92) Sherman, Texas
- Party: Republican
- Spouse: Onilla

Ronny J. "Ron" May (born September 16, 1934) is an American technologist and former Colorado legislator. An Air Force veteran, he was elected to the Colorado Springs city council, then to the Colorado House of Representatives as a Republican in 1992. After serving eight years in the state house, he was elected to the Colorado Senate in 2000 and again in 2004. He retired from government in 2007 to become a fellow with the Center for Digital Government and Government Technology magazine.

== Biography ==
Born in Sherman, Texas, May attended Southeastern Oklahoma State University, where he played college baseball. He earned a bachelor's degree from the University of Nebraska. He joined the United States Air Force in 1954, and was a pilot and navigator. He was then sent for training as a programmer analyst on early computer technology in the 1960s, beginning a lifelong interest in information technology. He served on Colorado's Information Management Commission, the Multi-Use Network, and as a charter member of the United States Internet Council.

May retired from the Air Force in 1974 and settled in Colorado Springs, Colorado, where he served on the Colorado Springs city council from 1981 to 1985, then in the Colorado House of Representatives from 1993–2000.

In the legislature, May also established was a social and fiscal conservative who focused on transportation and technology issues. Having worked on the expansion of Powers Boulevard in eastern Colorado Springs in the 1980s, he sponsored legislation creating Colorado's first ongoing budgetary reserve for roadway funding. When federal speed limits were revoked in 1995, he sponsored legislation to raise speed limits on rural Interstate highways to 75 miles per hour (120.7 km/h). He was noted for his opposition to labor unions, and repeatedly introduced legislation to strengthen Colorado's right-to-work legislation.

May chaired the legislature's Joint Computer Management Committee and was a member of the Colorado legislature during the installation of Internet service in the Colorado State Capitol in the 1990s. He is credited with setting up the building's first wireless internet network. As a member of the state's Information Management Commission, he also helped established the Colorado General Assembly's online legislative information system. In 2006, he sponsored legislation creating the state position of chief information security officer, and provided state funding to the Colorado cyber-security office. Outside the legislature, he operated a firm specializing in computer consulting for small businesses.

In 2000, May ran for the Colorado State Senate, facing activist Douglas Bruce in the Republican primary. In an unusual move, the local Chamber of Commerce and state party leaders, including Governor Bill Owens, endorsed May in the party primary, which he won by 112 votes.

May was elected to the Colorado State Senate in the 2000 general election, defeating Democrat Dan Tafoya and Libertarian Patricia Glidewell. He was unchallenged for reelection in 2004,representing Senate District 10, which includes eastern Colorado Springs, Colorado and rural El Paso County, Colorado. During Republican control of the legislature, he rose to become chairman of the Senate Transportation Committee. When Democrats obtained control of the legislature, he became Minority Caucus Chair. During the 2007-2008 legislature session, he served on the Senate State, Veterans & Military Affairs Committee and the Senate Transportation Committee.

Nearing the end of his second term, barred by term limits from running again, May announced his resignation from the legislature effective October 31, 2007. He had become a senior fellow at Government Technology Magazine and the Center for Digital Government; in 2005, the magazine named him one of their top 25 "Doers, Dreamers and Drivers." State Representative Bill Cadman was appointed to fill May's seat.
