= List of John Kasich 2016 presidential campaign endorsements =

Kasich For America
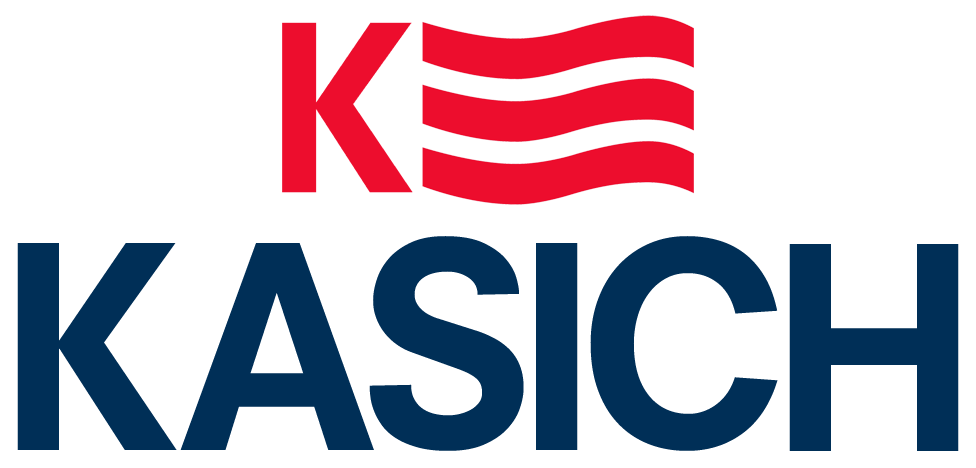
- Campaign: U.S. presidential election, 2016
- Candidate: John Kasich; Governor of Ohio (2011–2019)
- Affiliation: Republican Party
- Status: Announced: July 21, 2015; Suspended: May 4, 2016
- Headquarters: Columbus, Ohio
- Key people: Matt Carle, campaign manager
- Receipts: (2015-09-30)
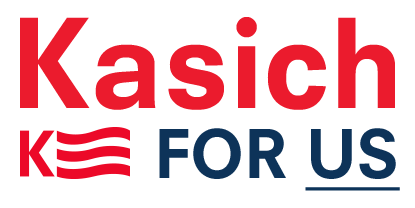
- Slogan

Website
- www.johnkasich.com

This is a list of prominent individuals and organizations that voiced their endorsement of John Kasich as the Republican Party's presidential nominee for the 2016 U.S. presidential election.

== Federal cabinet-level officials ==
=== Former ===
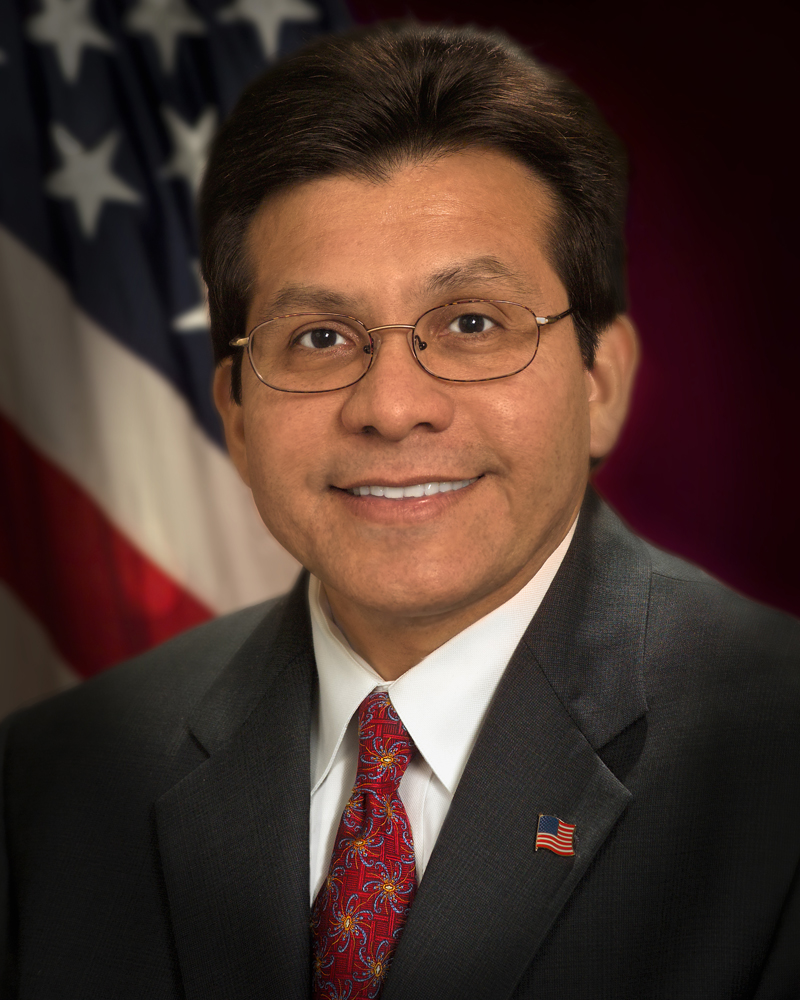
Alberto Gonzales

- Alberto Gonzales, 80th United States Attorney General (2005–2007), White House Counsel (2001–2005)
- Ray LaHood, 16th Secretary of Transportation (2009–2013) and Congressman from Illinois's 18th district (1995–2009)
- Mike Leavitt, 20th Secretary of Health and Human Services (2005–2009), 10th Administrator of the Environmental Protection Agency (2003–2005) and 14th governor of Utah (1993–2003)
- Robert McFarlane, 13th Assistant to the President for National Security Affairs (1983–1985)
- Tom Ridge, 1st Secretary of Homeland Security (2003–2005) and 43rd governor of Pennsylvania (1995–2001)
- Dick Thornburgh, 76th United States Attorney General (1988–1991), and 41st governor of Pennsylvania (1979–1987)
- Tommy Thompson, 19th United States Secretary of Health and Human Services (2001–2005), and 42nd governor of Wisconsin (1987–2001)
- Christine Todd Whitman, 9th Administrator of the Environmental Protection Agency (2001–2003) and 50th governor of New Jersey

== Governors ==
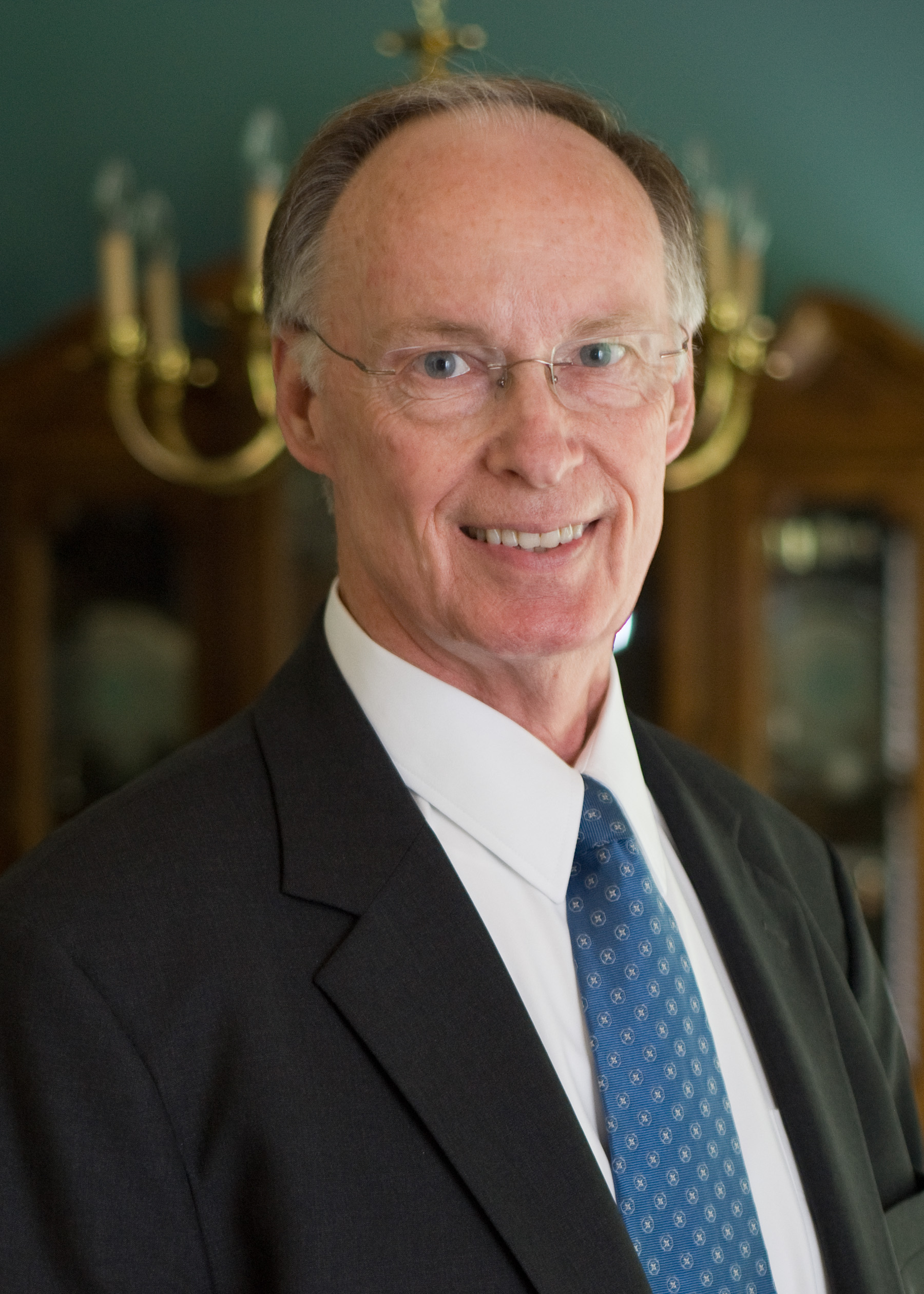
Robert J. Bentley

=== Current ===
- Robert J. Bentley, 53rd governor of Alabama
- Butch Otter, 32nd governor of Idaho
- Brian Sandoval, 29th governor of Nevada

=== Former ===
- Jim Martin, 70th governor of North Carolina (1985–1993)
- Scott McCallum, 43rd governor of Wisconsin (2001–2003)
- Arnold Schwarzenegger, 38th governor of California (2003–2011)
- William Weld, 68th governor of Massachusetts (1991–1997)
- Lincoln Almond, 72nd governor of Rhode Island (1995–2003)
- George Pataki, 53rd governor of New York (1995–2006) and former 2016 presidential candidate
- Jim Douglas, 80th governor of Vermont (2003–2011)

== U.S. senators ==
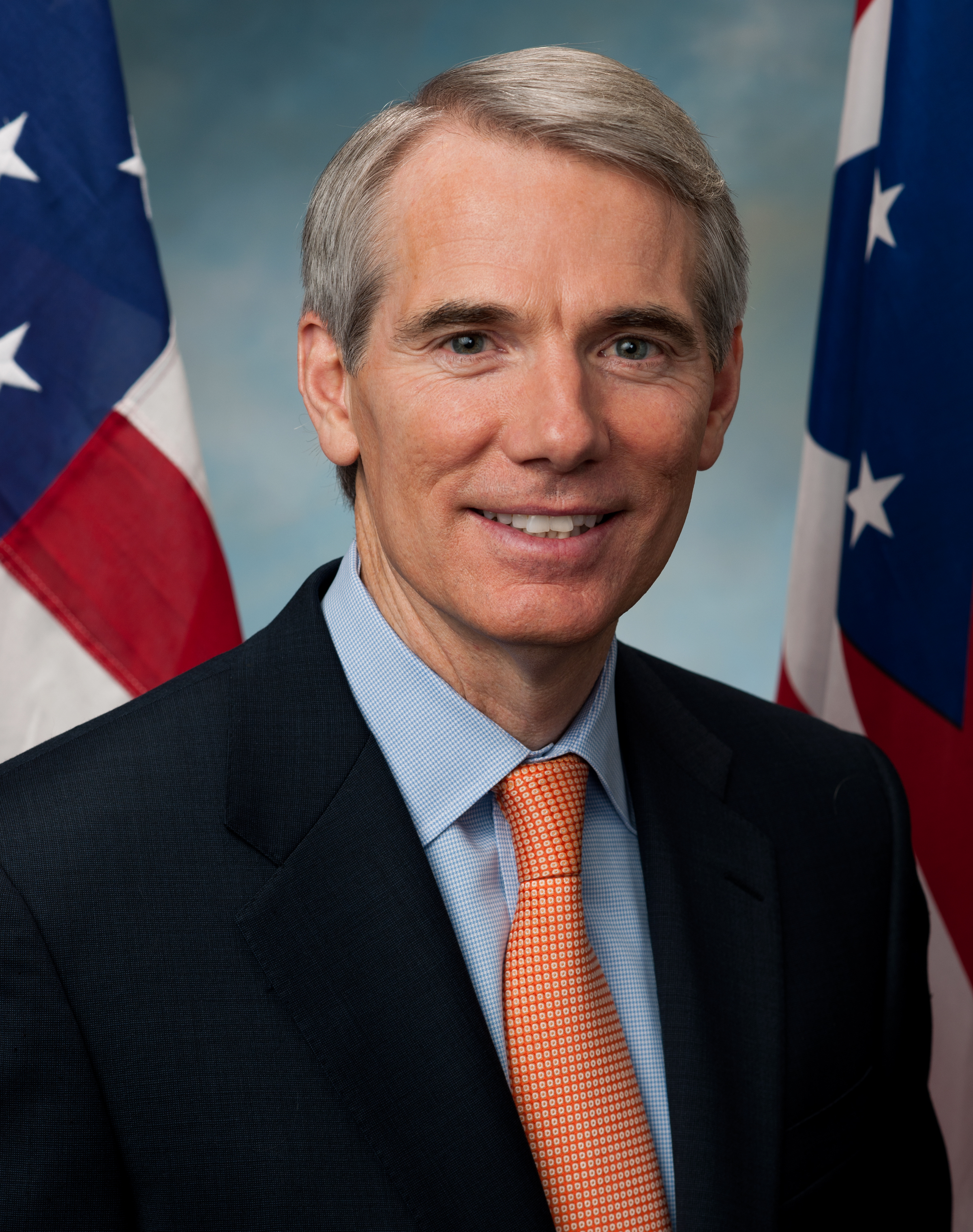
Rob Portman

=== Current ===
- Jim Inhofe, Oklahoma
- Rob Portman, Ohio

=== Former ===
- Bob Bennett, Utah (1993–2011)
- Ben Nighthorse Campbell, Colorado (1993–2005)
- Al D'Amato, New York (1981–1999)
- Mike DeWine, Ohio (1995–2007), future governor of Ohio
- Daniel J. Evans, Washington (1983–1989) and 16th governor of Washington (1965–1977)
- Slade Gorton, Washington (1981–1987, 1989–2001)
- Judd Gregg, New Hampshire (1993–2011) and 76th governor of New Hampshire (1989–1993)
- Gordon J. Humphrey, New Hampshire (1979–1990)
- Trent Lott, Mississippi (1989–2007), former Senate majority leader
- Alan K. Simpson, Wyoming (1979–1997)
- John E. Sununu, New Hampshire (2003-2009)

== U.S. representatives ==
=== Current ===
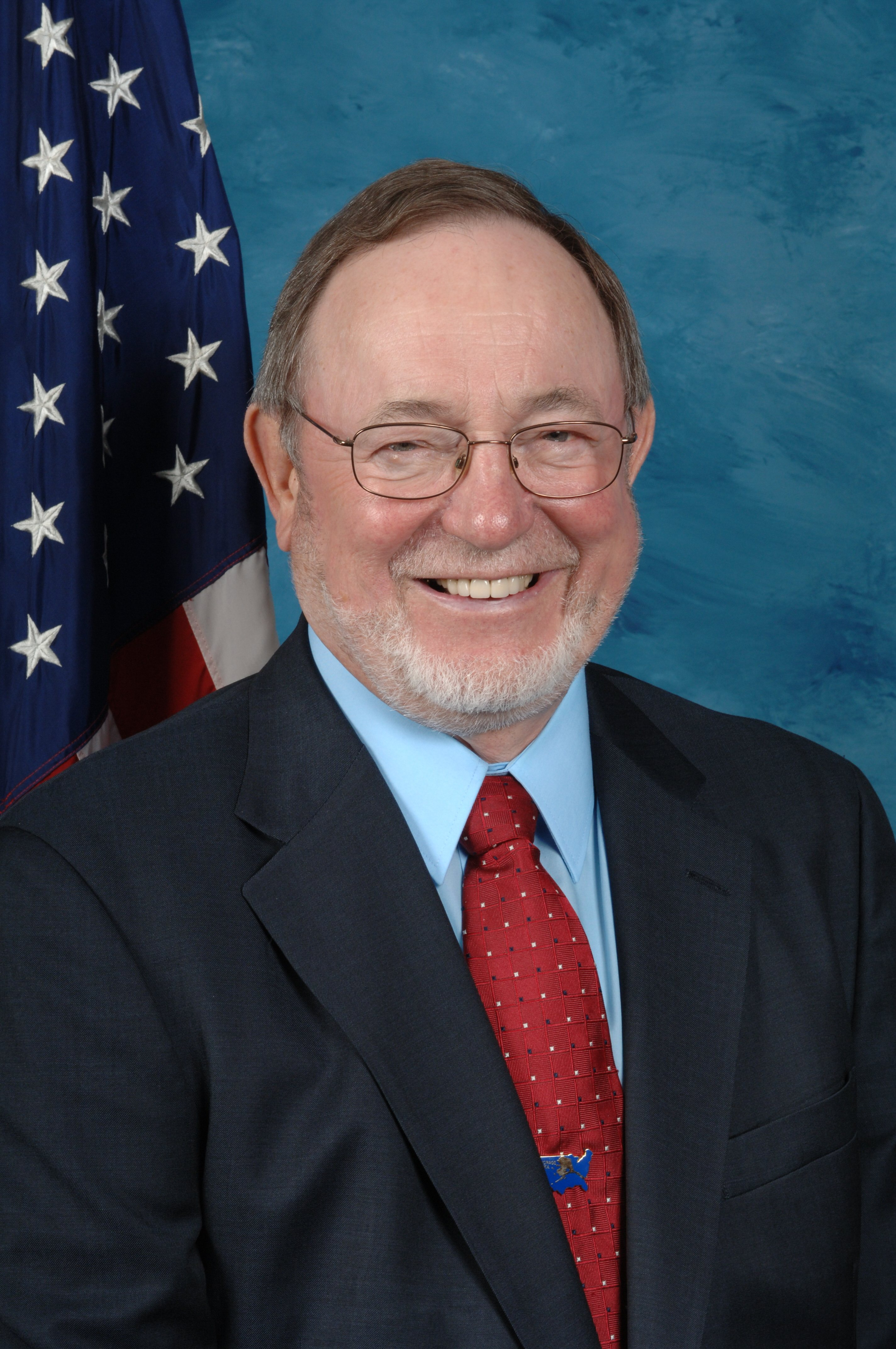
Rep. Don Young

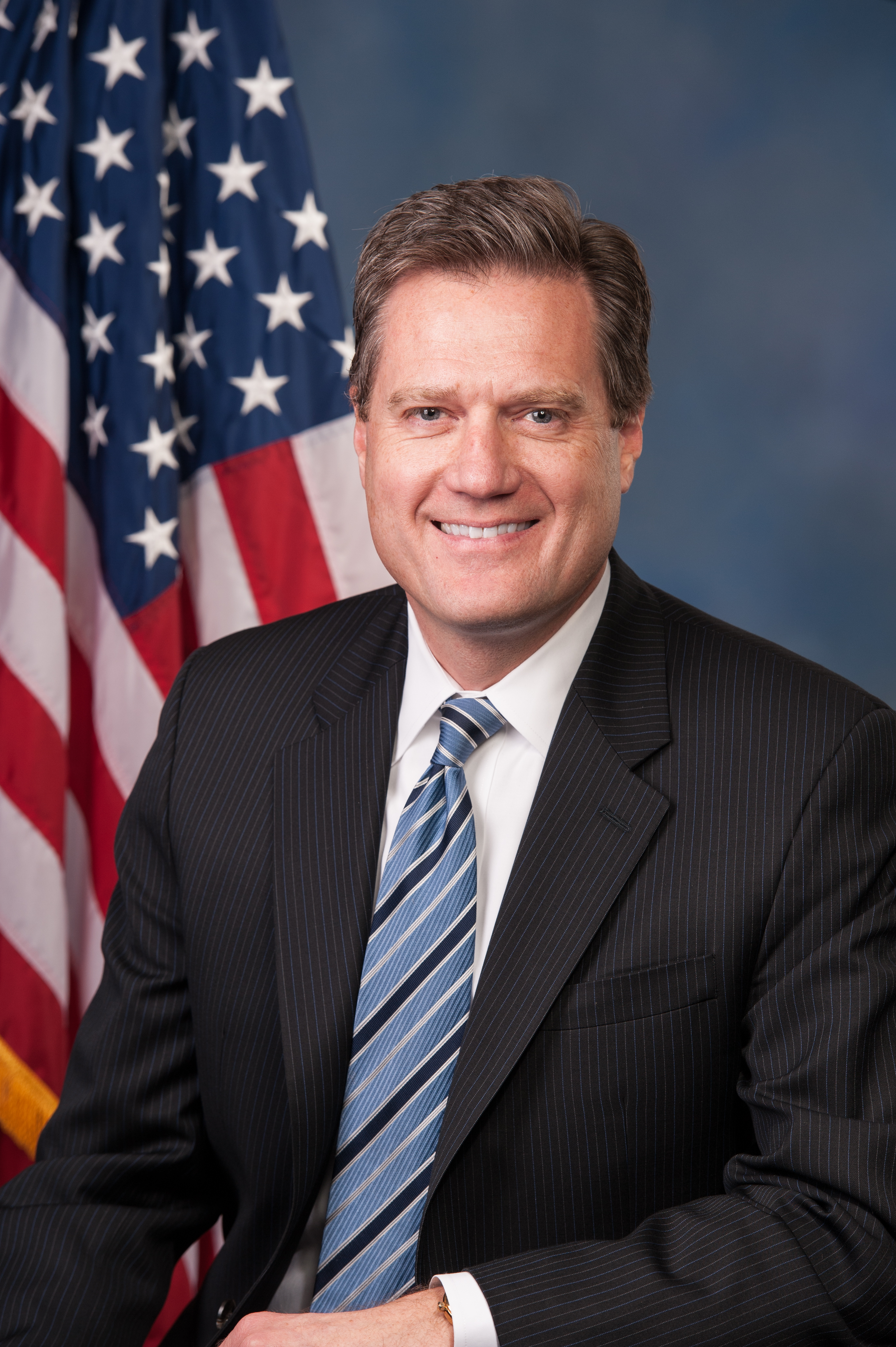
Rep. Mike Turner

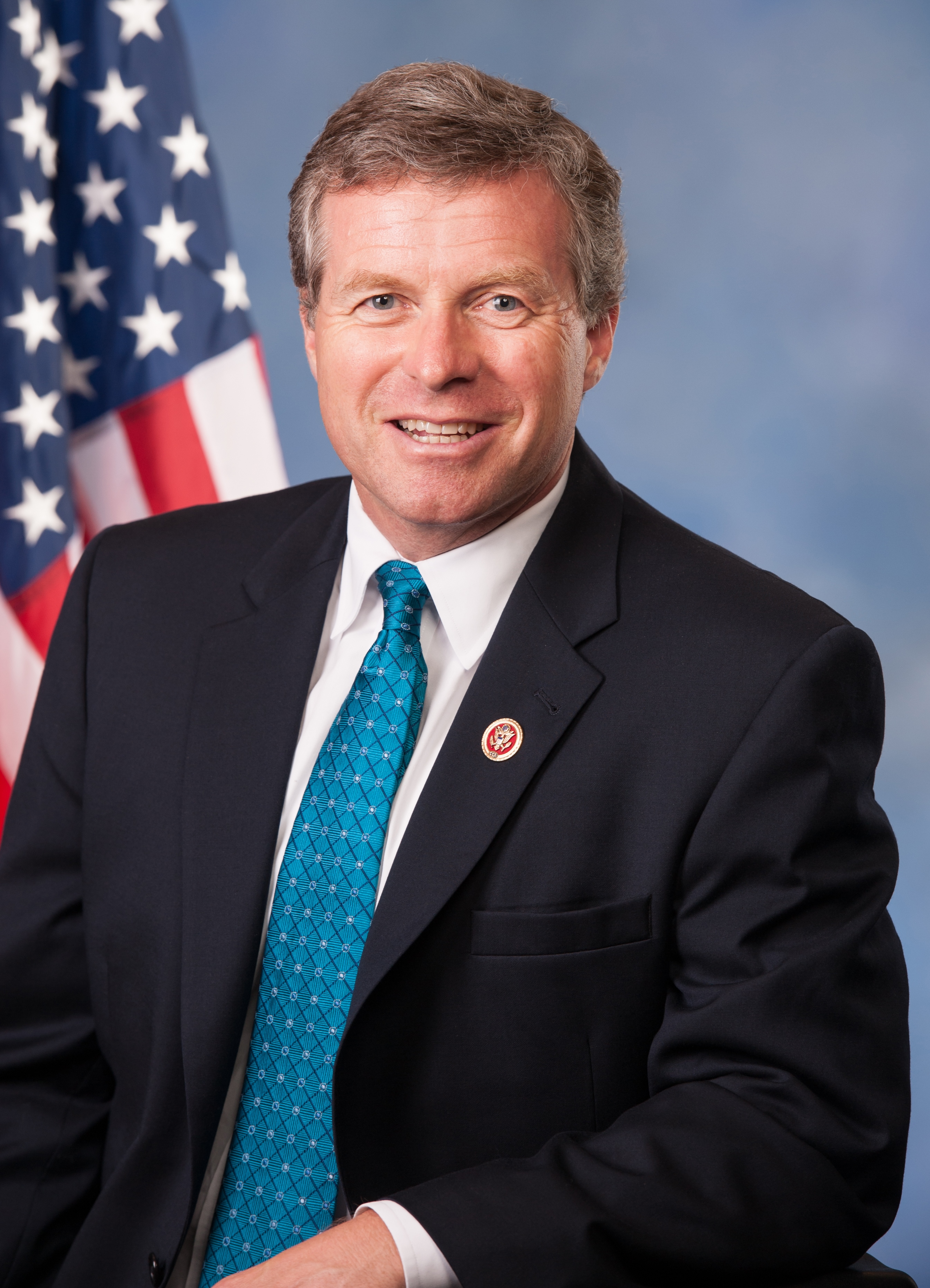
Chairman Charlie Dent

- Don Young of Alaska
- Mike Bishop of Michigan
- Gregg Harper of Mississippi
- Bill Johnson of Ohio
- Steve Stivers of Ohio
- Pat Tiberi of Ohio
- Mike Turner of Ohio, also the president of the NATO Parliamentary Assembly
- Charlie Dent of Pennsylvania, also chairman of the House Ethics Committee

=== Former ===
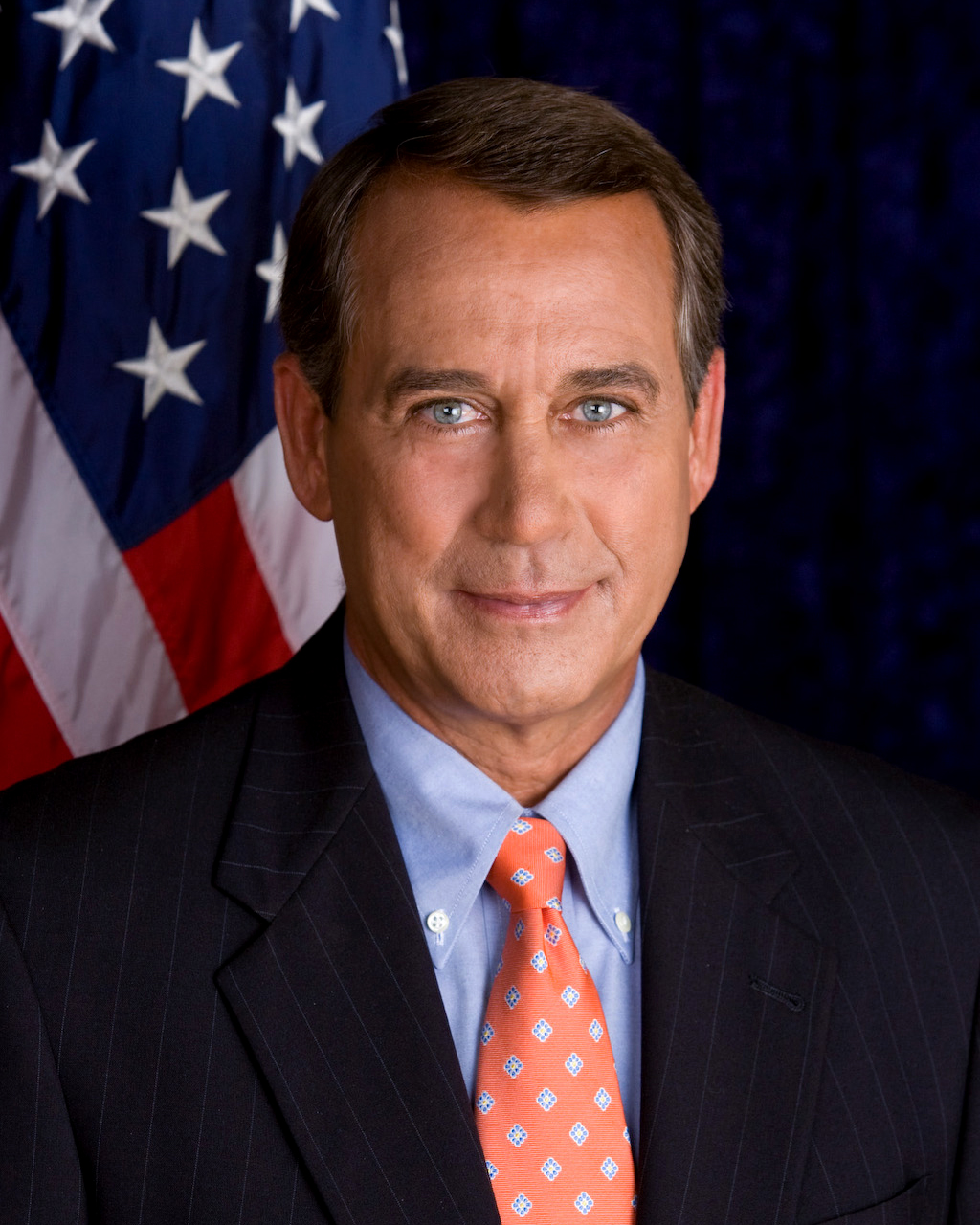
Speaker John Boehner

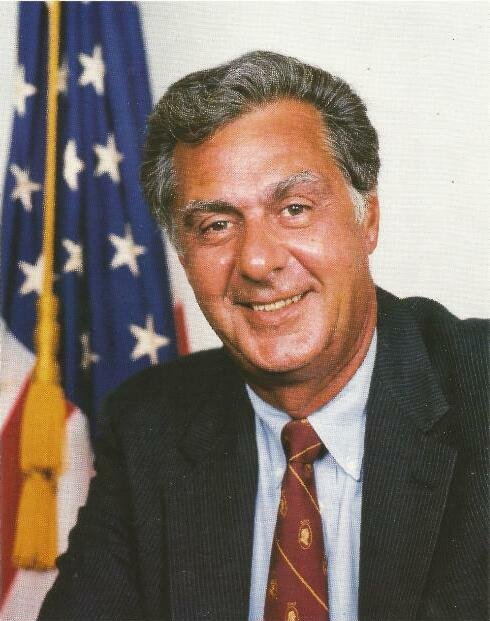
House Majority Leader Dick Armey

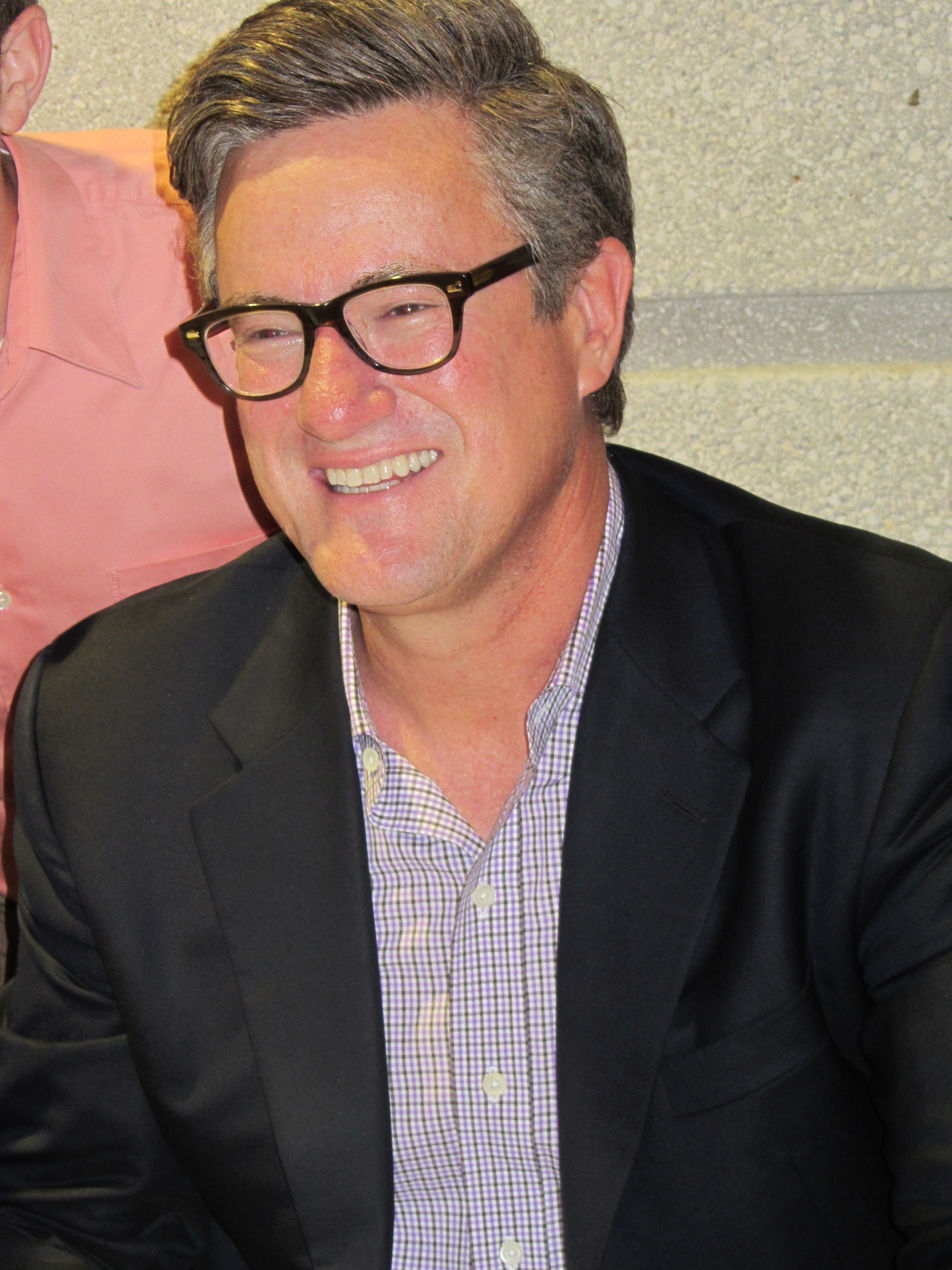
Former Rep. and Morning Joe Co-host Joe Scarborough

- Spencer Bachus of Alabama
- Mary Bono of California
- Tom Campbell of California, current Dean of Chapman University School of Law
- Chris Shays of Connecticut
- Lawrence J. DeNardis of Connecticut
- Nancy Johnson of Connecticut
- Thomas B. Evans Jr. of Delaware
- Joe Scarborough of Florida (currently a media pundit) (previously endorsed Jeb Bush)
- Charles Djou of Hawaii
- Dan Burton of Indiana
- Larry J. Hopkins of Kentucky
- Jim McCrery of Louisiana
- Connie Morella of Maryland
- Peter G. Torkildsen of Massachusetts
- Pete Hoekstra of Michigan
- Vin Weber of Minnesota
- Webb Franklin of Mississippi
- Michael Parker of Mississippi
- Kenny Hulshof of Missouri
- Chuck Douglas of New Hampshire
- Charles Bass of New Hampshire
- Dick Zimmer of New Jersey
- James T. Walsh of New York
- Joseph J. DioGuardi of New York
- Bill Cobey of North Carolina
- John Boehner of Ohio, former Speaker of the United States House of Representatives
- Mike Oxley of Ohio
- Deborah Pryce of Ohio
- Martin Hoke of Ohio
- Ralph Regula of Ohio
- Steve LaTourette of Ohio
- Robert Smith Walker of Pennsylvania
- Jon D. Fox of Pennsylvania
- Dick Armey of Texas, former House Majority Leader
- Tom Loeffler of Texas
- Steve Bartlett of Texas
- Jim Hansen of Utah
- Chris Cannon of Utah
- Thomas M. Davis of Virginia
- G. William Whitehurst of Virginia
- George Nethercutt of Washington
- Scott Klug of Wisconsin
- Mark Neumann of Wisconsin

== U.S. ambassadors ==
- Tom C. Korologos, former ambassador to Belgium (2004–2007)
- William McCormick, former ambassador to New Zealand and Samoa (2005–2009)
- Charles Swindells, former ambassador to New Zealand and Samoa (2001–2005)

== Statewide officials ==
- California: Steve Poizner Silicon Valley entrepreneur and former insurance commissioner of California,
- Michigan: Brian Calley, Lieutenant Governor of Michigan
- Two from Nevada: Ron Knecht (State Controller of Nevada), Bob Seale (former Nevada State Treasurer)
- New Hampshire: Thomas D. Rath (former attorney general of New Hampshire)
- New Jersey: Andrew Sidamon-Eristoff (former state treasurer)
- Four from Ohio: Jon Husted (Ohio Secretary of State), Dave Yost (Auditor of Ohio), Mary Taylor (Lieutenant Governor of Ohio) Mike DeWine (Attorney General)
- Pennsylvania: Robert Jubelirer (former lieutenant governor of Pennsylvania)
- Rhode Island: Bernard Jackvony (former lieutenant governor of Rhode Island)
- South Carolina: Buck Limehouse (former South Carolina Secretary of Transportation)
- Two from Vermont: Phil Scott (Lieutenant Governor of Vermont) and Randy Brock (former Vermont Auditor of Accounts)
- Three from Washington: Rob McKenna (former attorney general of Washington), Sam Reed (former secretary of state of Washington) and Ralph Munro (former secretary of state of Washington)
- Wisconsin: Jack Voight, former state treasurer

== State legislators ==
=== Arizona ===
- Arizona State Representatives: Tony Rivero, Bob Robson, John Kaites (former)

=== Arkansas ===
- Arkansas State Representative: Mathew Pitsch

=== Colorado ===
- Three Colorado State Representatives: Amy Stephens (former majority leader), B.J. Nikkel (former majority whip), Jeannie Reeser (former)

=== Delaware ===
- Two Delaware State Representatives: Deborah Hudson (Minority Whip), Tim Boulden (former)

=== Georgia ===
- Four Georgia State Senators: Bill Cowsert (State Majority Leader), Fran Millar, Rusty Paul (former; also former state party chair, current mayor of Sandy Springs), Chuck Hufstetler
- Five Georgia State Representatives: Tom Taylor, Wendell Willard, David Knight, John Meadows, John Deffenbaugh

=== Idaho ===
- Idaho State Senator: Marv Hagedorn
- Idaho State Representative: Robert Anderst

=== Illinois ===
- Three Illinois State Senators: Christine Radogno (Minority Leader), Daniel Cronin (former), Dave Syverson
- Seven Illinois State Representatives: Ed Sullivan Jr., David Harris, Ron Sandack, Tom Demmer, Randy Frese, Jil Tracy (former), Chad Hays (Assistant Minority Leader)

=== Iowa ===
- Nine Iowa State Representatives: Mary Ann Hanusa, Brent Siegrist (former Speaker), David Sieck, Brad Hansen (former), Dan Clute (former), Doug Struyk (former), John Clark (former), Darrell Hanson (former), George Eichhorn (former)
- Two Iowa State Senators: Andy McKean (former), Bob Brunkhorst (former)

=== Kentucky ===
- Kentucky State Representative: Jim Zimmerman,

=== Louisiana ===
- Louisiana State Senator: Norby Chabert

=== Maine ===
- Maine State Senator: Tom Saviello

=== Maryland ===
- Maryland State Senator: Howard Denis (former)
- Seven Maryland State Delegates: Mary Beth Carozza, Ric Metzgar, Robert Flanagan, Tony O'Donnell, Herbert H. McMillan, Michael Malone, Donald E. Murphy (former)

=== Massachusetts ===
- Massachusetts State Senator: Bruce Tarr (Minority Leader)
- Six Massachusetts State Representatives: Paul Frost, Kimberly Ferguson, Peter Durant, F. Jay Barrows Kate Campanale, Lenny Mirra

=== Michigan ===
- Seven Michigan State Senators: Arlan Meekhof (Senate Majority Leader), Wayne Schmidt, Joel Gougeon (former), Beverly Hammerstrom (former majority leader), Tom George (former), Leon Stille (former), Wayne Kuipers (former),
- Eleven Michigan State Representatives: Tom Leonard (Speaker Pro Tempore), Jason Sheppard, Bradford Jacobsen, Chris Ward (former majority leader), Edward Gaffney (former), Chris Afendoulis, Larry Inman, Earl Poleski, Mickey Mortimer (former), Paul H. Scott (former), Andrew Richner

=== Mississippi ===
- Five Mississippi State Senators: Giles Ward (President Pro Tem), Josh Harkins, Brice Wiggins, Billy Hewes (former president pro tem; current mayor of Gulfport), Billy Hudson,
- Two Mississippi State Representative: Toby Barker, Trey Lamar

=== Missouri ===
- Two Missouri State Senators: Ryan Silvey, Emory Melton

=== Nevada ===
- Member of the Nevada Assembly: John Hambrick (Speaker)

=== New Hampshire ===
==== State senators ====
- Six New Hampshire State Senators: David Boutin, Ed Dupont (former State Senate President), Andrew Peterson (former), Frederick King Sr., William S. Bartlett Jr., Mark Hounsell (former)

==== State representatives ====
- Nine New Hampshire State Representatives: Jack Flanagan (House Majority Leader), Harold B. Parker, Doug Scamman (former Speaker), Stella Scamman (former), Robert Rowe, Stephen Darrow, Norman Major, Ken Peterson, Dino Scala (former)

=== New Jersey ===
- New Jersey State Senator: Jen Beck
- New Jersey Assembly Member: Barbara Wright (former)

=== New York ===
- Five Members of the New York State Assembly: Raymond Walter, Andrew Raia, Chad A. Lupinacci Andrew Garbarino, Andy Goodell

=== North Carolina ===
- North Carolina State Senator: Stan Bingham
- Two North Carolina State Representatives: D. Craig Horn, Rex L. Baker (former)

=== Ohio ===
- Twenty-three Ohio State Senators: Keith Faber (President of the Senate), Frank LaRose., Chris Widener, Joe Uecker, Tom Patton, Grace Drake (former), Bob Peterson, Kevin Bacon, Jim Hughes, John Eklund, Bill Seitz, Cliff Hite, Jay Hottinger, Gayle Manning, Jimmy Stewart (former), Bill Beagle, Peggy Lehner, Troy Balderson, Scott Oelslager, Frank LaRose, David Burke, Shannon Jones, Randy Gardner
- Thirty-seven Ohio State Representatives: Jo Ann Davidson (former), Robert R. Cupp, Timothy Derickson, Ross McGregor (former), Tim Ginter, Jeffrey McClain, Marlene Anielski, Nan Baker, Jim Buchy, Andrew Brenner, Mike Duffey, Anne Gonzales, Cheryl Grossman, Stephanie Kunze, Ryan Smith, Robert Sprague, Dave Hall, Margaret Ruhl, Bill Hayes, Scott Ryan, Nathan Manning, Barbara Sears, Bob Hackett, Larry Obhof, Steve Huffman, Niraj Antani, Brian Hill, Tony Burkley, Gary Scherer, Terry Johnson, Bill Reineke, Kirk Schuring, Marilyn Slaby, Anthony DeVitis, Dorothy Pelanda, Ron Amstutz, Cliff Rosenberger (Speaker)

=== Oregon ===
- Two Oregon State Senators: Jason Atkinson (former), Bruce Starr (former)
- Four Oregon State Representatives: Knute Buehler, John Davis, Billy Dalto (former), Derrick Kitts (former)

=== Pennsylvania ===
- Three Pennsylvania State Senators: Joseph B. Scarnati (President pro tem), Earl M. Baker (former), John Gordner
- Three Pennsylvania State Representatives: Gary Day, Fred Keller, Aaron Kaufer

=== Rhode Island ===
- Rhode Island State Senator: Dawson Hodgson (former)

=== South Carolina ===
- Four South Carolina State Senators: Raymond Cleary, Paul G. Campbell Jr., Greg Gregory, Ronnie W. Cromer
- Six South Carolina State Representatives: Heather Ammons Crawford, Gary E. Clary, Jeffrey A. Bradley, Chip Limehouse, Donna C. Hicks, Phyllis Henderson

=== Tennessee ===
- Tennessee State Representative: Steve Buttry (former)

=== Utah ===
- Four Utah State Senators:Daniel W. Thatcher, Steve Urquhart Brian Shiozawa, Evan Vickers
- 15 Utah State Representative: Becky Edwards, Sophia DiCaro, Steve Handy, Merrill Nelson, Kraig Powell, Lowry Snow, Raymond Ward, Bruce Cutler, Jack Draxler, Steve Eliason, Gage Froerer, Tim Hawkes, Don Ipson, Paul Ray, Doug Sagers

=== Vermont ===
- Three Vermont State Senators: Peg Flory, Kevin J. Mullin, Rich Westman

=== Virginia ===
- Four Virginia State Delegates: Glenn Davis, Chris Peace, Ron Villanueva, Thomas Davis Rust
- Three Virginia State Senators: Emmett Hanger, Jeannemarie Devolites Davis (former), Frank Wagner

=== West Virginia ===
- Two West Virginia State Senators: Ryan Ferns, Daniel Hall
- Two West Virginia State Delegates: Roger Hanshaw, Matthew Rohrbach

== Mayors and other municipal leaders ==
- Arizona: Rick Romley, former county attorney for Maricopa County, Arizona (1989–2004).
- Nevada: Bob Beers (Las Vegas City Councilman)
- Utah: Jon Pike, mayor of St. George, Utah
- Virginia: John Cook (Fairfax County Supervisor)

== Republican National Committee members (current and former) ==
- Amy Tarkanian, former Nevada Republican chairwoman, wife of Danny Tarkanian
- Chuck Yob, former Republican National Committee member
- Fergus Cullen, former New Hampshire GOP chairman.
- Clarke Reed, former Mississippi GOP chairman.
- Raul Danny Vargas, former chairman of the Republican National Hispanic Assembly
- Frank Suitter, former Utah GOP chairman

== Businesspeople ==
- Ronald Burkle, billionaire venture capitalist, co-owner of the Pittsburgh Penguins
- Rick Caruso, billionaire businessman and philanthropist.
- Robert Addison Day, business executive and philanthropist.
- Stanley Druckenmiller, billionaire hedge fund manager
- Philip Geier, former chairman and chief executive officer of the Interpublic Group of Companies
- Dan Gilbert, Quicken Loans
- Ken Langone, Home Depot co-founder and CEO of Geeknet
- Julian Robertson, hedge fund manager
- JD Vance, venture capitalist, future Vice President of the United States.

== State parties ==
- Ohio Republican Party

== Other political individuals ==
- Robert F. Orr, former North Carolina Supreme Court Associate Justice
- Michael Hayden, former director of the CIA
- Joseph Mohorovic, commissioner of the U.S. Consumer Product Safety Commission
- Bobbie Kilberg, former director of the Office of Public Liaison.
- Ron Saxton, 2006 Republican nominee for Governor of Oregon
- Richard Tarrant, businessman, 2006 Republican nominee for United States Senator from Vermont

== Newspapers ==
- The New York Times
- Boston Globe
- The Arizona Republic
- Concord Monitor
- The Keene Sentinel
- Storm Lake Times
- The Portsmouth Herald
- Foster's Daily Democrat
- Nashua Telegraph
- The Daily Nonpareil Council Bluffs, Iowa.
- New Hampshire Valley News
- Monadnock Ledger-Transcript
- The Dallas Morning News
- The State
- The Post and Courier
- Corpus Christi Caller-Times
- Waco Tribune-Herald
- The Free Lance–Star
- Daily Hampshire Gazette
- Detroit Free Press
- SF Tech Beat
- Seattle Times
- Portland Press Herald
- Detroit News
- Lexington Herald-Leader
- Cincinnati Enquirer
- Chicago Sun-Times
- The Clarion-Ledger
- Idaho Statesman
- Seattle Times
- Cleveland Plain Dealer
- Akron Beacon Journal
- Journal Star
- Milwaukee Journal Sentinel
- Albany Times Union
- The Post-Standard (Syracuse.com)
- The Post-Star (Glen Falls, New York)
- The Daily Gazette (Capital Region, New York)
- The Hartford Courant
- Iowa City Press Citizen
- Quad-City Times

== Organizations ==
- United States Hispanic Chamber of Commerce

== Celebrities, commentators, and activists ==
- Tim Allen, comedian and actor
- Charles Barkley, former basketball player and current analyst
- Brady C. Olson, founder of Deez Nuts presidential campaign
- Montel Williams, television personality, radio talk show host, and actor
- Michael Reagan, son of former president Ronald Reagan, and former radio talk show host.
- Urban Meyer, Ohio State Buckeyes football head coach, and 3 time NCAA football championship winning head coach
- Stephen S. Oswald, former NASA astronaut.
- William F. Readdy, former NASA astronaut.
- Eugene Cernan, former Naval aviator, fighter pilot, and NASA astronaut
- Dirk Haire, general counsel to the Maryland Republican Party
- Chris Mowery, Historian, YouTuber (VloggingThroughHistory)

== See also ==
- List of Donald Trump presidential campaign endorsements, 2016
- List of Ted Cruz presidential campaign endorsements, 2016
- List of Republicans opposing Donald Trump presidential campaign, 2016
