= List of Ted Cruz 2016 presidential campaign endorsements =

Cruz For President
- Campaign: 2016 U.S. presidential election
- Candidate: Ted Cruz; U.S. Senator (2013–present); Carly Fiorina; CEO of Hewlett-Packard (1999–2005)
- Affiliation: Republican Party
- Status: Announced: March 23, 2015
- Headquarters: Houston, Texas
- Key people: Jeff Roe, campaign manager
- Receipts: US$66,547,755 (2016-02-29)
- Slogan(s): Together, we will win.

Website
- Cruz for President

This is a list of prominent individuals and organizations that voiced their endorsement of Ted Cruz as the Republican Party's presidential nominee for the 2016 United States presidential election.

== U.S. governors ==
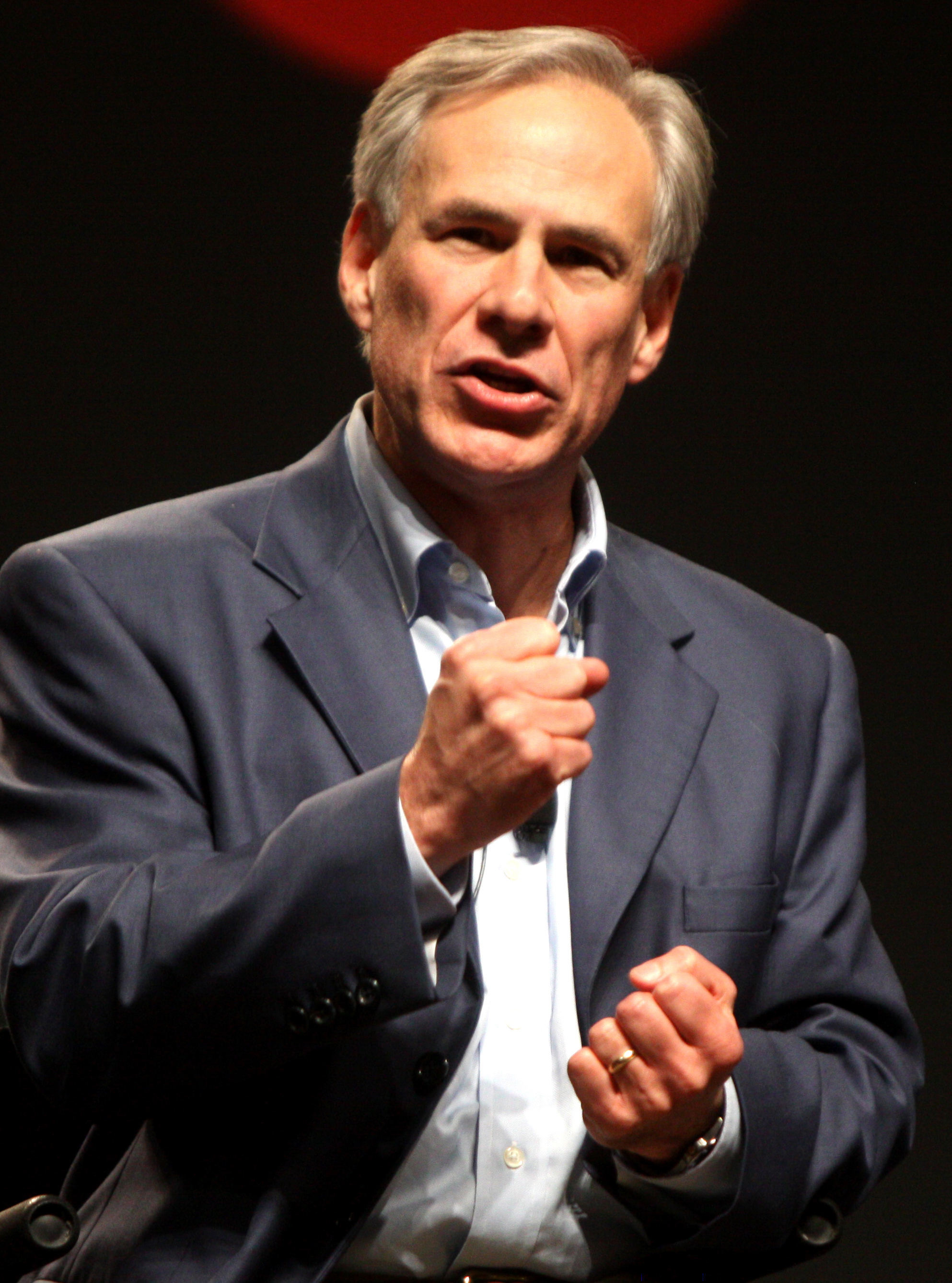
Greg Abbott

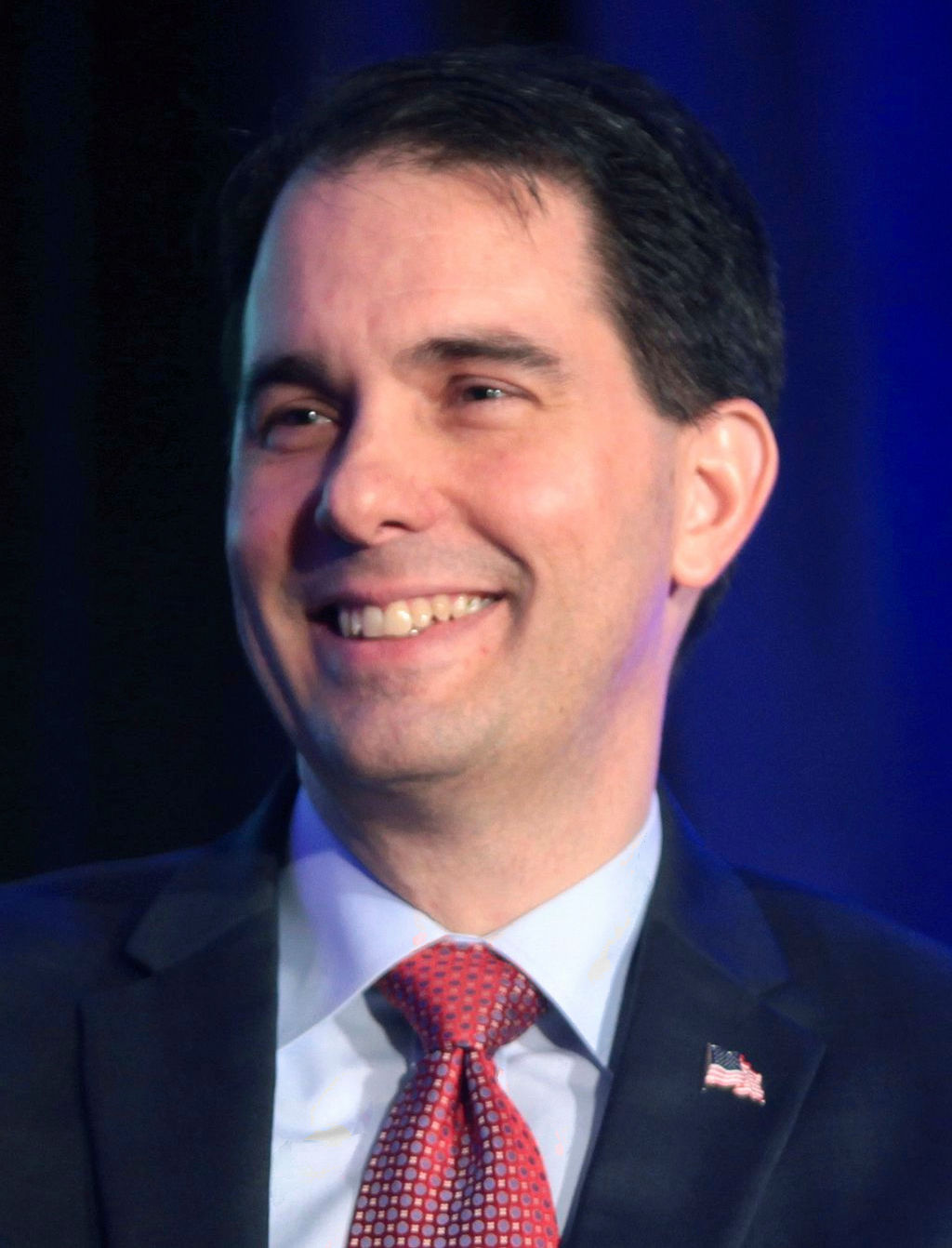
Scott Walker

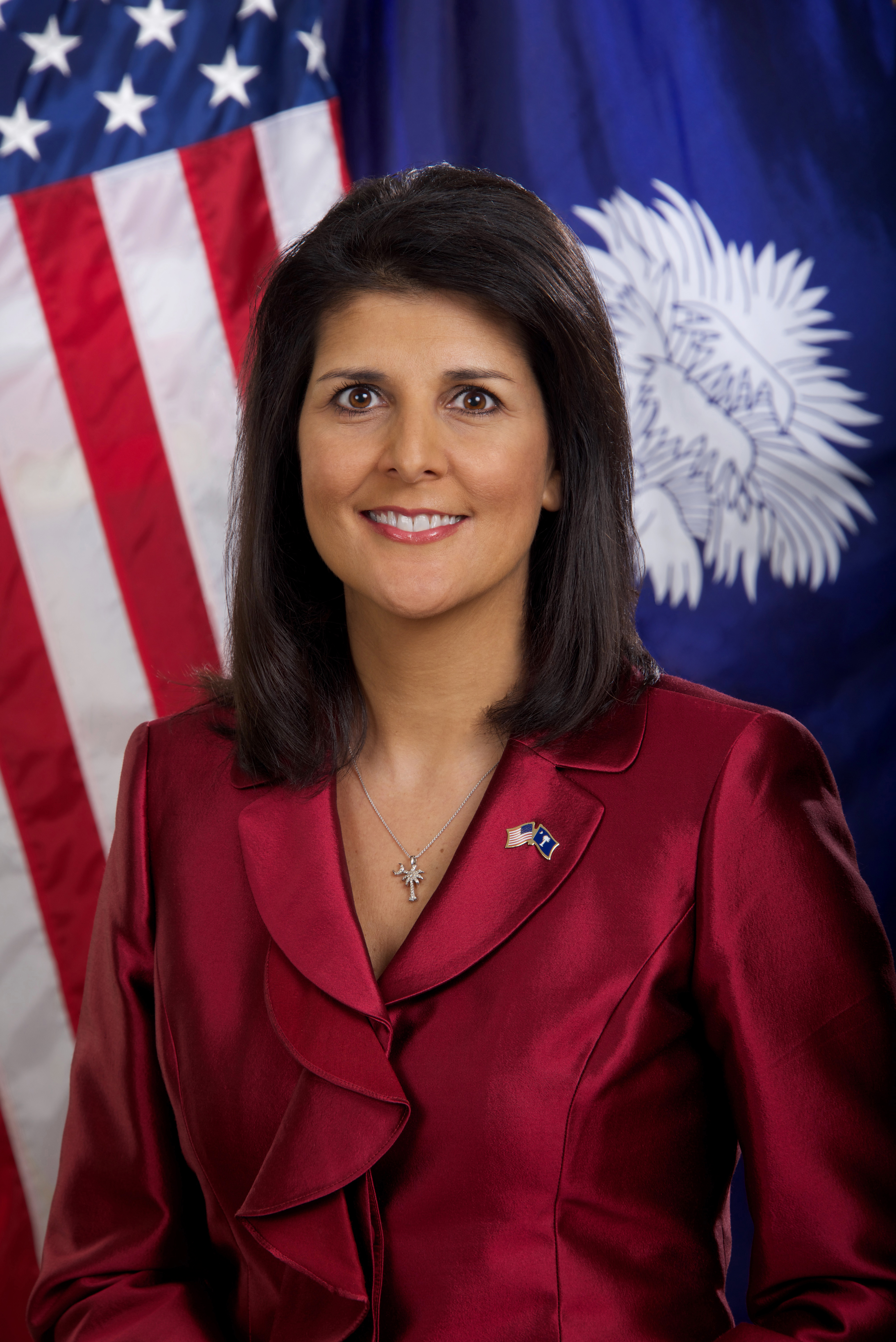
Nikki Haley

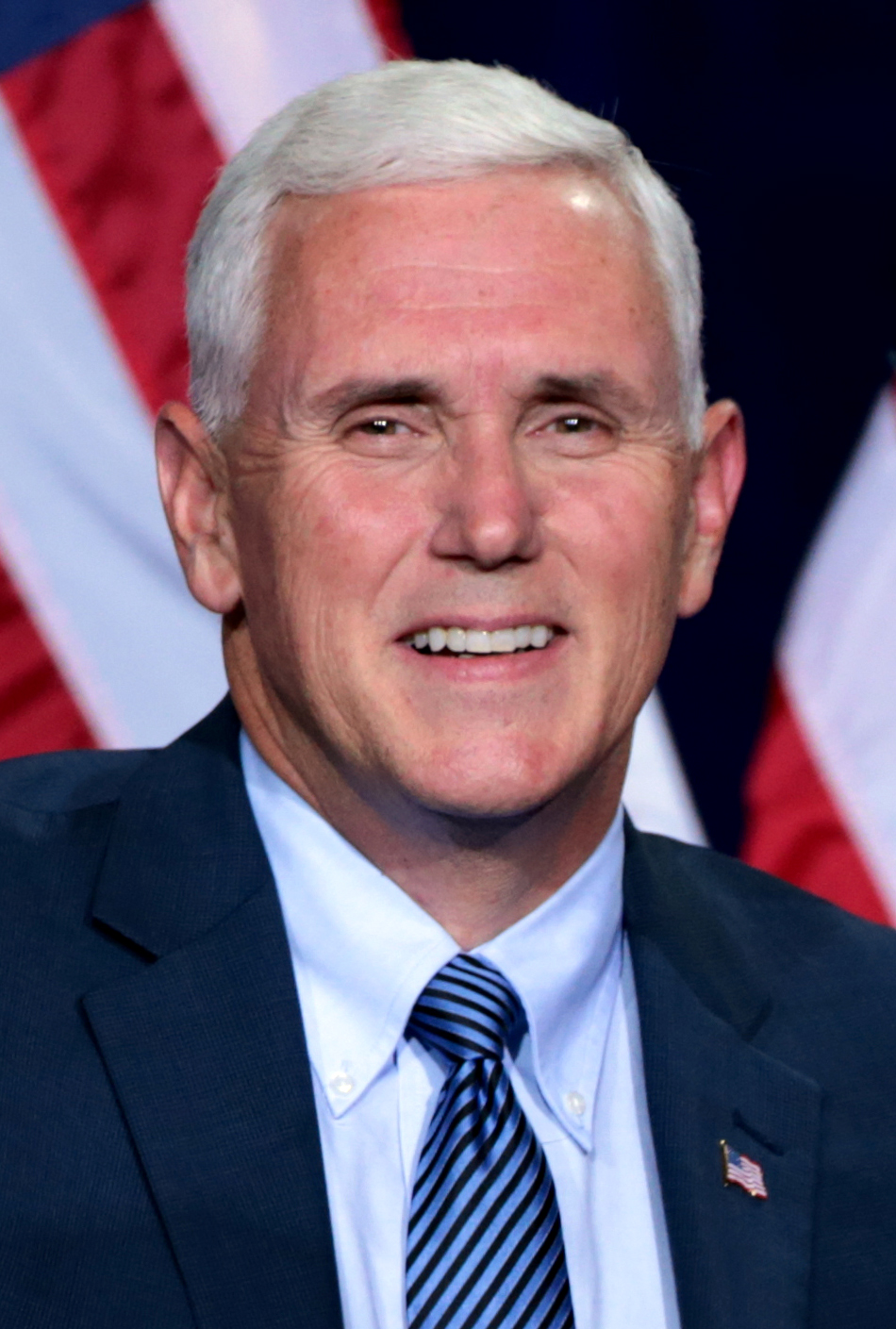
Mike Pence

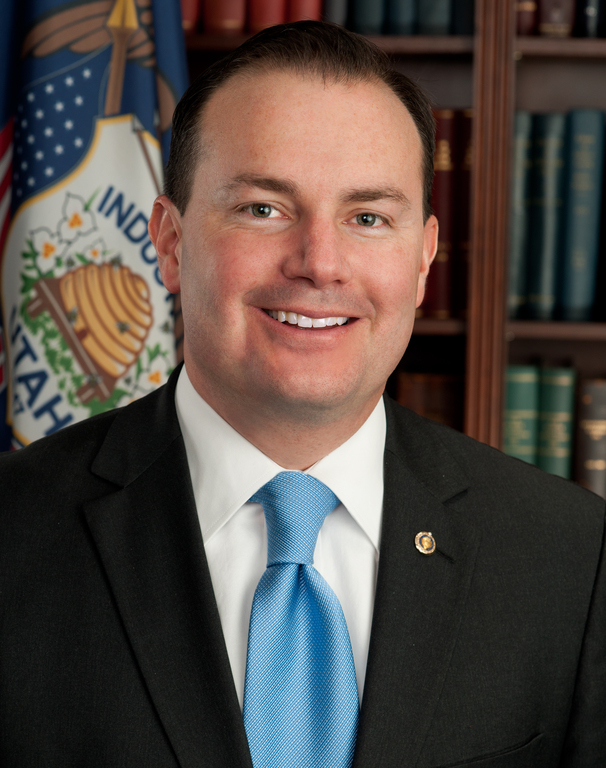
Mike Lee

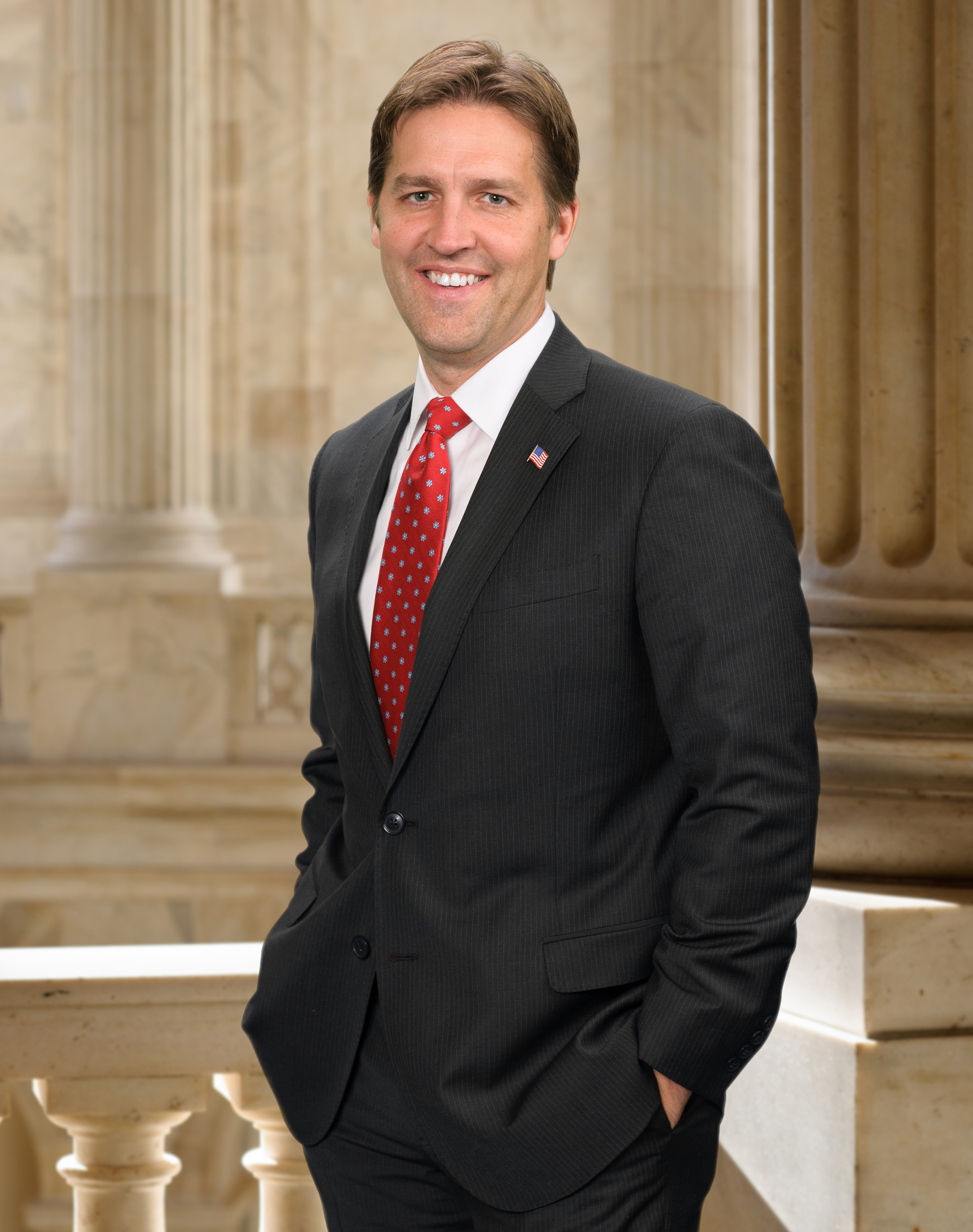
Ben Sasse

=== Incumbent ===
- Greg Abbott, Texas
- Phil Bryant, Mississippi
- Eddie Calvo, Guam
- Nikki Haley, South Carolina (previously endorsed Marco Rubio)
- Gary Herbert, Utah
- Mike Pence, Indiana (eventual running mate of Donald Trump)
- Scott Walker, Wisconsin; 2016 presidential candidate

=== Former ===
- Jeb Bush, Florida; 2016 presidential candidate
- Rick Perry, Texas; 2012 and 2016 presidential candidate
- Mitt Romney, Massachusetts; Republican nominee for President of the United States in 2012 ("Mr. Romney’s vote in Utah, where he owns a house in Holladay, is not an endorsement, his allies stressed. Rather, it is part of his effort to unite the Republican Party around an alternative to Mr. Trump." per The New York Times)
- Mark Sanford, South Carolina; also U.S. representative from South Carolina 1995–2001 and 2013–2019
- Pete Wilson, California

== U.S. senators ==
=== Current ===
- Cory Gardner, Colorado (previously endorsed Marco Rubio)
- Lindsey Graham, South Carolina; 2016 presidential candidate (previously endorsed Jeb Bush)
- Mike Lee, Utah
- Jim Risch, Idaho (previously endorsed Marco Rubio)
- Ben Sasse, Nebraska
- Pat Toomey, Pennsylvania (previously endorsed Marco Rubio)

=== Former ===
- Phil Gramm, Texas (previously endorsed Marco Rubio)
- Bob Smith, New Hampshire; 2000 presidential candidate
- Pete Wilson, California

== Executive branch officials ==
- John S. Herrington, 5th United States Secretary of Energy (1985–1989)

== U.S. representatives ==
=== Current ===
- Justin Amash, Representative from Michigan (previously endorsed Rand Paul)
- Brian Babin, Representative from Texas
- Jim Bridenstine, Representative from Oklahoma
- Mo Brooks, Representative from Alabama
- Ken Buck, Representative from Colorado
- Michael C. Burgess, Representative from Texas
- John Culberson, Representative from Texas
- Jeff Duncan, Representative from South Carolina
- Trent Franks, Representative from Arizona
- Louie Gohmert, Representative from Texas
- Paul Gosar, Representative from Arizona
- Sam Graves, Representative from Missouri
- Glenn Grothman, Representative from Wisconsin
- Jeb Hensarling, Representative from Texas
- Jody Hice, Representative from Georgia
- Tim Huelskamp, Representative from Kansas
- Sam Johnson, Representative from Texas
- Steve King, Representative from Iowa
- Doug Lamborn, Representative from Colorado
- Mia Love, Representative from Utah (previously endorsed Marco Rubio)
- Tom McClintock, Representative from California
- Mark Meadows, Representative from North Carolina
- Alex Mooney, Representative from West Virginia
- John Ratcliffe, Representative from Texas
- Reid Ribble, Representative from Wisconsin (previously endorsed Marco Rubio)
- Dana Rohrabacher, Representative from California
- Matt Salmon, Representative from Arizona
- David Schweikert, Representative from Arizona
- Ann Wagner, Representative from Missouri
- Randy Weber, Representative from Texas
- Roger Williams, Representative from Texas

=== Former ===
- Bob Barr, Representative from Georgia; also Libertarian nominee in 2008
- Paul Broun, Representative from Georgia
- David Davis, Representative from Tennessee
- Jack Kingston, Representative from Georgia
- Jim Ryun, Representative from Kansas
- Tom Tancredo, Representative from Colorado; also presidential candidate in 2008

== Republican National Committee members ==
- Saul Anuzis, chair of MI GOP (2005–2009)
- Ellen Barrosse (DE), Melody Potter (WV), and Carolyn McLarty (OK), leaders of the Conservative Steering Committee of the Republican National Committee
- Tina Benkiser, chair of TX GOP (2003–2009)
- Morton Blackwell, Republican National Committeeman from Virginia
- Richard Cebra, chair of ME GOP (2012–2013)
- Giovanni Cicione, former chairman of the Rhode Island Republican Party
- Tirso del Junco, former California Republican Party Chairman
- Will Deschamps, former Montana Republican Party Chairman
- Kathy Hayden, Republican National Committeewoman from Virginia
- Jack Kimball, former chairman of the New Hampshire Republican State Committee
- Willis Lee, former Hawaii Republican Party Chairman
- Ron Nehring, chair of CA GOP (2007–2011)
- Dr. Jim Pelura, former chairman, Maryland Republican Party 2006–2009.
- Barry Peterson, former chairman of the Idaho Republican Party
- Mike Schroeder, California Republican Party Chairman (1997–1999)
- Norm Semanko, chair of ID GOP (2008–2012)

== Statewide officials ==
- Kirk Bushman, Montana Public Service Commissioner
- Patricia Dillon Cafferata, former Nevada State Treasurer
- Charlie Condon, former South Carolina Attorney General
- Spencer Cox, Lieutenant Governor of Utah (2013-2021)
- Ron Crane, Idaho State Treasurer
- Ken Cuccinelli, former Attorney General of Virginia and President of Senate Conservatives Fund
- David Dewhurst, former lieutenant governor of Texas
- Scott Gessler, former secretary of state of Colorado
- Ralph Hudgens, Georgia Insurance Commissioner
- Adam Laxalt, Nevada Attorney General (2015-2019)
- Mark Martin, Arkansas Secretary of State
- Dan Patrick, Lieutenant Governor of Texas
- Ken Paxton, Texas Attorney General (2015-present)
- David J. Porter, Texas Railroad Commissioner
- Matt Schultz, former secretary of state of Iowa
- Ryan Sitton, Texas Railroad Commissioner
- Don Stenberg, Treasurer of Nebraska
- George Strake Jr., former secretary of state of Texas
- Wayne W. Williams, Secretary of State of Colorado

== State legislators ==
Alabama:

- Shay Shelnutt, state senator

Arizona:

- Sylvia Allen, state senator
- Judy Burges, state senator
- Noel W. Campbell, state representative
- Mark Finchem, state representative
- Anthony Kern, state representative
- Adam Kwasman, state representative (former)
- Jay Lawrence, state representative
- Vince Leach, state representative
- David Livingston, state representative (House Majority Whip)
- Al Melvin, state senator (former)
- Steve Montenegro, state representative (House Majority Leader)
- Steve Smith, state senator
- Bob Thorpe, state representative

Arkansas:

- Bob Ballinger, state representative
- Rick Beck, state representative
- Mary Bentley, state representative
- Linda Collins-Smith, state senator
- Donnie Copeland, state representative
- Bruce Cozart, state representative
- Scott Flippo, state senator
- Justin Gonzales, state representative
- Michelle Gray, state representative
- Kim Hammer, state representative
- Peggy Jeffries, state senator (former),
- Jack Ladyman, state representative
- Robin Lundstrum, state representative
- Stephen Meeks, state representative
- John Payton, state representative
- Terry Rice, state senator
- Brandt Smith, state representative
- Gary Stubblefield, state senator
- Dan Sullivan, state representative

California:

- Travis Allen, state assembly
- Jim Battin, state senator (former)
- Scott Baugh, state assembly (former Minority Leader)
- Ted Gaines, state senator
- Martin Garrick, state assembly (former Minority Leader)
- Shannon Grove, state assembly
- Matthew Harper, state assembly
- Ray Haynes, state assembly (former)
- Dennis Hollingsworth, state senator (former Minority Leader)
- Brian Jones, state assembly
- Jay Obernolte, state assembly
- Donald P. Wagner, state assembly
- Marie Waldron, state assembly

Colorado:

- Perry Buck, state representative
- Justin Everett, state representative
- Kevin Grantham, state senator
- Ted Harvey, state senator (former)
- Chris Holbert, state senator
- Stephen Humphrey, state representative
- Janak Joshi, state representative
- Gordon Klingenschmitt, state representative
- Kent Lambert, state senator
- Timothy Leonard, state representative
- Kevin Lundberg, state senator
- Paul Lundeen, state representative
- Patrick Neville, state representative
- Dan Nordberg, state representative
- Kim Ransom, state representative
- Jack Tate, state senator
- Kevin Van Winkle, state representative
- Cole Wist, state representative
- Laura J. Woods, state senator

Connecticut:

- Joe Markley, state senator

Florida:

- Neil Combee, state representative
- Alan Hays, state senator
- Mike Hill, state representative
- Larry Metz, state representative

Georgia:

- Timothy Barr, state representative
- Mike Crane, state senator
- Clint Day, state senator (former)
- Emory Dunahoo, state representative
- Sheri Gilligan, state representative
- Micah Gravley, state representative
- Marty Harbin, state senator
- Dustin Hightower, state representative
- Bill Jackson, state senator
- Jeff Jones, state representative
- William Ligon, state senator
- Tony McBrayer, state representative (former)
- Josh McKoon, state senator
- Jason Spencer, state representative
- Bruce Thompson, state senator

Hawaii:

- Bob McDermott, state representative
- Sam Slom, state senator

Idaho:

- Lenore Barrett, state representative (former)
- Gayle Batt, state representative
- Judy Boyle, state representative
- Greg Chaney, state representative
- Brent Crane, state representative
- Sage Dixon, state representative
- Terry Gestrin, state representative
- Steven Harris, state representative
- Ron Mendive, state representative
- Jason Monks, state representative
- Ronald M. Nate, state representative
- Bob Nonini, state senator
- Sheryl Nuxoll, state senator
- Joe Palmer, state representative
- Jim Rice, state senator
- Heather Scott, state representative
- Paul Shepherd, state representative
- Mary Souza, state senator
- Janet Trujillo, state representative
- Steve Vick, state senator

Illinois:

- Tim Bivins, state senator
- Jeanne Ives, state representative
- Chapin Rose, state senator

Indiana:

- Tim Brown, state representative
- Bob Cherry, state representative
- Wes Culver, state representative
- Dale DeVon, state representative
- Bob Heaton, state representative
- Brandt Hershman, state senator (Majority Leader)
- Travis Holdman, state senator
- Dennis Kruse, state senator
- Donald Lehe, state representative
- Matthew Lehman, state representative (Majority Leader)
- Cindy Noe, state representative (former)
- Jeff Raatz, state senator
- Scott Schneider, state senator
- Mike Speedy, state representative
- P. Eric Turner, state representative (former Speaker Pro Tempore)
- Timothy Wesco, state representative

Iowa:

- Bill Anderson, state senator
- Terry Baxter, state representative
- Jerry Behn, state senator
- Jake Chapman, state senator
- Randy Feenstra, state senator
- Dennis Guth, state senator
- Greg Heartsill, state representative
- Steve Holt, state representative
- Sandy Salmon, state representative
- Jason Schultz, state senator
- Larry Sheets, state representative
- Ralph Watts, state representative

Kansas:

- Tom Arpke, state senator
- Tony Barton, state representative
- Blake Carpenter, state representative
- J. R. Claeys, state representative
- Steve Fitzgerald, state senator
- Randy Garber, state representative
- Amanda Grosserode, state representative
- Dennis Hedke, state representative
- Brett Hildabrand, state representative
- Steve Huebert, state representative
- Mark Kahrs, state representative
- Kasha Kelley, state representative
- Mike Kiegerl, state representative
- Craig McPherson, state representative
- Mary Pilcher-Cook, state senator
- Randy Powell, state representative
- John Rubin, state representative
- William Sutton, state representative

Louisiana:

- Elbert Guillory, state senator (former)

Maine:

- Kevin Battle, state representative
- Russell Black, state representative
- David Burns, state senator
- Richard Campbell, state representative
- Dale Crafts, state representative
- Paul Davis, state senator
- Kathleen Dillingham, state representative
- Stacey Guerin, state representative
- James Hamper, state senator
- Jeffrey Hanley, state representative
- Jonathan Kinney, state representative
- MaryAnne Kinney, state representative
- Ricky Long, state representative
- Peter Lyford, state representative
- Garrett Mason (Majority Leader), state senator
- Michael McClellan, state representative
- Joel Stetkis, state representative
- Jeff Timberlake, state representative

Maryland:

- Steven J. Arentz, state representative
- William Folden, state representative
- Jefferson L. Ghrist, state representative
- Glen Glass, state representative
- Michael Hough, state senator
- Tony McConkey, state representative
- Warren E. Miller, state representative
- Neil Parrott, state representative
- Justin Ready, state senator
- Deb Rey, state representative
- Sid Saab, state representative
- Stephen M. Waugh, state senator
- Brett Wilson, state representative

Massachusetts:

- James J. Lyons Jr., state representative

Michigan:

- Patrick Colbeck, state senator
- Ray Franz, state representative
- Gary Glenn, state representative
- Thomas Hooker, state representative
- Joel Johnson, state representative
- Bruce Patterson, state senator
- Fulton Sheen, state representative (former)
- Lana Theis, state representative

Minnesota:

- Roger Chamberlain, state senator
- Al DeKruif, state senator (former)
- Steve Drazkowski, state representative
- Paul Gazelka, state senator
- Steve Green, state representative
- Glenn Gruenhagen, state representative
- Dave Hancock, state representative
- Josh Heintzeman, state representative
- Jerry Hertaus, state representative
- Kathy Lohmer, state representative
- Tim Miller, state representative
- Jim Newberger, state representative
- Cindy Pugh, state representative

Mississippi:

- Chris McDaniel, state senator
- Melanie Sojourner, state senator (former)

Missouri:

- Kurt Bahr, state representative
- Carl Bearden, state representative (former Speaker pro Tempore)
- Rick Brattin, state representative
- Eric Burlison, state representative
- Jason Crowell, state senator (former)
- Paul Curtman, state representative
- Charlie Davis, state representative
- Ed Emery, state senator
- Doug Funderburk, state representative (former)
- Denny Hoskins, state representative (Speaker Pro Tem)
- Will Kraus, state senator
- Brad Lager, state senator (former)
- John Lamping, state senator (former)
- Jim Lembke, state senator (former)
- John McCaherty, state representative
- Bob Onder, state senator
- Mark Parkinson, state representative
- Chuck Purgason, state senator (former)
- Eric Schmitt, state senator
- Delbert Scott, state senator (former)
- Bryan Stevenson, state representative (former)
- Rob Vescovo, state representative
- Bill White, state representative
- John Wiemann, state representative

Montana:

- Nancy Ballance, state representative
- Seth Berglee, state representative
- Tom L. Burnett, state representative
- Alan Doane, state representative (Majority Whip)
- Kris Hansen, state senator
- Austin Knudsen, state representative (Speaker)
- Sarah Laszloffy, state representative
- Theresa Manzella, state representative
- Ken Miller, state senator (former)
- Matthew Monforton, state representative
- Dale L. Mortensen, state representative
- Matthew Rosendale, state senator (Majority Leader)
- Cary Smith, state senator (Majority Whip)
- Brad Tschida, state representative
- Daniel Zolnikov, state representative

Nebraska:

- Dave Bloomfield, state senator
- Joni Craighead, state senator
- Laura Ebke, state senator
- Curt Friesen, state senator
- Mike Groene, state senator
- Dan Hughes, state senator
- Bill Kintner, state senator
- Tyson Larson, state senator
- Brett Lindstrom, state senator
- John Murante, state senator
- Merv Riepe, state senator
- Jim Scheer, state senator
- Ken Schilz, state senator
- Dan Watermeier, state senator

Nevada:

- Victoria Dooling, state assembly
- Michele Fiore, state assembly
- Ira Hansen, state assembly
- John Moore, state assembly
- Victoria Seaman, state assembly
- Jim Wheeler, state assembly

New Hampshire:

- Max Abramson, state representative
- Harry Accornero, state representative (former)
- Patrick Bick, state representative
- Duane R. Brown, state representative
- Carol Bush, state representative
- Rick Christie, state representative
- Guy Comtois, state representative
- Jane Cormier, state representative (former)
- Allen Cook, state representative
- Sue DeLemus, state representative
- Eric Eastman, state representative
- Harold F. French, state representative
- Larry Gagne, state representative
- Richard Gordon, state representative
- Fenton Groen, state senator (former)
- Warren Groen, state representative
- Jeffrey Harris, state representative
- J. R. Hoell, state representative
- Eric Johnson, state representative
- Walter Kolodziej, state representative
- Bill Kuch, state representative
- Mark McLean, state representative
- Maureen Mooney, state representative
- Josh Moore, state representative
- Jeanine Notter, state representative
- Bill O'Brien, state representative (Speaker 2010–2012)
- Katherine Prudhomme-O'Brien, state representative
- Greg Salts, state representative (former)
- David Scott, state representative (former)
- Ken Sheffert, state representative (former)
- Will Smith, state representative (former)
- James Spillane, state representative
- Len Turcotte, state representative
- Timothy Twombly, state representative
- Carol Vita, state representative (former)
- Lucien Vita, state representative (former)
- Fran Wendelboe, state representative (former)
- Dave Wheeler (1992–1998, also rep 1988–1992), state senator
- Colette Worsman, state representative (former)

New Jersey:

- Michael Patrick Carroll, Assemblyman

New York:

- David Storobin, state senator (former)

North Carolina:

- Phil Berger, state senator (President pro tempore)
- Rayne Brown, state representative

Ohio:

- Andy Thompson, state representative

Oklahoma:

- Brian Bingman, state senator (President pro tempore)
- David Brumbaugh, state representative
- David Derby, state representative
- Dan Fisher, state representative
- Mark Lepak, state representative
- Mark McCullough, state representative
- Michael Rogers, state representative
- Gary Stanislawski, state senator
- Chuck Strohm, state representative
- Anthony Sykes, state senator
- Ken Walker, state representative
- Justin Wood, state representative

South Carolina:

- Lee Bright, state senator
- Mike Burns, state representative
- Bill Chumley, state representative
- Wendy Nanney, state representative
- Garry R. Smith, state representative

Tennessee:

- Janice Bowling, state senator
- Sheila Butt, state representative (House Majority Floor Leader)
- Joe Carr, state representative (former)
- Tilman Goins, state representative
- Mark Green, state senator
- Joey Hensley, state senator
- Kelly Keisling, state representative
- Ron Lollar, state representative
- Judd Matheny, state representative (former House Speaker Pro-Tempore)
- Frank S. Niceley, state senator
- Jay Reedy, state representative
- Courtney Rogers, state representative
- Jerry Sexton, state representative
- Mike Sparks, state representative
- Billy Spivey, state representative
- Jim Tracy, state senator
- James Van Huss, state representative
- Rick Womick, state representative
- Jason Zachary, state representative

Texas:

- Cecil Bell Jr., state representative
- Brian Birdwell, state senator
- DeWayne Burns, state representative
- Konni Burton, state senator
- Brandon Creighton, state senator
- Myra Crownover, state representative
- Gary Elkins, state representative
- Pat Fallon, state representative
- Allen Fletcher, state representative
- Dan Flynn, state representative
- James Frank, state representative
- John Frullo, state representative
- Bob Hall, state senator
- Dan Huberty, state representative
- Bryan Hughes, state representative
- Jason Isaac, state representative
- Mark Keough, state representative
- Stephanie Klick, state representative
- Lois Kolkhorst, state senator
- Matt Krause, state representative
- Brooks Landgraf, state representative
- Jodie Laubenberg, state representative
- Jeff Leach, state representative
- Ken Mercer, state representative (former)
- Will Metcalf, state representative
- Doug Miller, state representative
- Rick Miller, state representative
- Jim Murphy, state representative
- Andrew Murr, state representative
- Gilbert Peña, state representative
- Larry Phillips, state representative
- Paul Pressler, state representative (former)
- John Raney, state representative
- Debbie Riddle, state representative
- Matt Rinaldi, state representative
- Matt Schaefer, state representative
- Mike Schofield, state representative
- Matt Shaheen, state representative
- Wayne Smith, state representative
- Stuart Spitzer, state representative
- Tony Tinderholt, state representative
- Scott Turner, state representative
- Jason Villalba, state representative
- Molly White, state representative
- John Wray, state representative
- Bill Zedler, state representative
- John Zerwas, state representative

Utah:

- Christopher Herrod, state representative (former)
- Curtis Oda, state representative
- Ken Sumsion, state representative (former)
- Matt Throckmorton, state representative (former)

Virginia:

- Mark Berg, state delegate
- Dick Black, state senator
- Brenda Pogge, state delegate
- Bill Stanley, state senator

Washington:

- Graham Hunt, state representative
- Jesse Young, state representative

Wisconsin:

- Joan Ballweg, state representative
- Janel Brandtjen, state representative
- Robert Brooks, state representative
- David Craig, state representative
- Bob Gannon, state representative
- Andre Jacque, state representative
- Joel Kleefisch, state representative
- Dean Knudson, state representative
- Jesse Kremer, state representative
- Mike Kuglitsch, state representative
- John Macco, state representative
- Stephen Nass, state senator
- Adam Neylon, state representative
- Jim Ott, state representative
- Keith Ripp, state representative
- Joe Sanfelippo, state representative
- Ken Skowronski, state representative
- John Spiros, state representative
- Jim Steineke, state representative (Majority Leader)
- Duey Stroebel, state senator
- Jeremy Thiesfeldt, state representative
- Robin Vos, state representative (Speaker)
- Van Wanggaard, state senator

Wyoming:

- Mark Baker, state representative
- Edward Buchanan, state representative (former Speaker)
- Scott Clem, state representative
- Amy Edmonds, state representative
- Harlan Edmonds, state representative
- Larry S. Hicks, state senator
- Kit Jennings, state senator (former)
- Mark Jennings, state representative
- Curt Meier, state senator
- David Miller, state representative
- Tom Reeder, state representative
- Mark Semlek, state representative
- Matt Teeters, state representative
- Nathan Winters, state representative

== Mayors and other municipal leaders ==
- Jan Goldsmith, San Diego City Attorney
- Diane Harkey, Member of the California State Board of Equalization
- Steve Lonegan, former Mayor of Bogota, New Jersey
- Michelle Park Steel, Orange County Supervisor

== International political figures ==
- Cory Bernardi, Australian Senator (Liberal Party)
- Oskar Jarle Grimstad, Norwegian MP (Progress Party)
- Janusz Korwin-Mikke, Polish MEP, leader of KORWiN
- Trevor Loudon (ACT New Zealand), New Zealand-born anti-communist commentator
- Louise Mensch, former British MP (Conservative Party), author and political commentator
- Kenneth Svendsen, Norwegian MP (Progress Party)

== Businesspeople ==
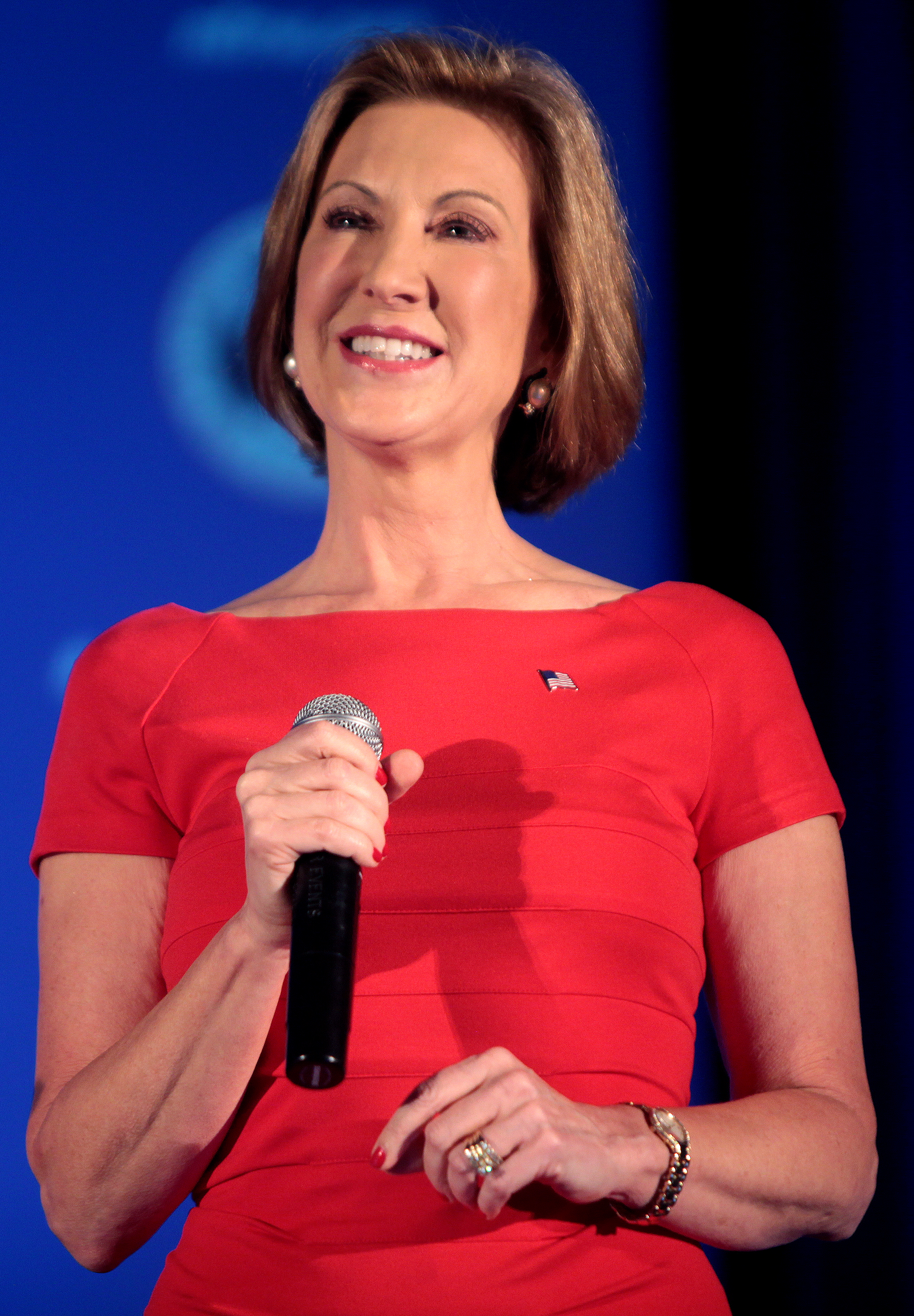
Carly Fiorina

- Neil Bush, son of George H. W. Bush; brother of George W. Bush and Jeb Bush
- Darwin Deason, founder of Affiliated Computer Services
- Carly Fiorina, former CEO of Hewlett Packard; 2016 presidential candidate; also Cruz's VP candidate
- Charles Foster, chairman of Foster LLP
- Cary M. Maguire, president of energy companies
- Robert Mercer, hedge fund manager
- Toby Neugebauer, shale and fracking private equity
- Richard Uihlein, manufacturing
- Kelcy Warren, chairman and chief executive officer of Energy Transfer Partners
- Jack Welch, former CEO of General Electric (also author/speaker)
- Dan and Farris Wilks, founders of Wilks Masonry

== Celebrities, commentators, and activists ==
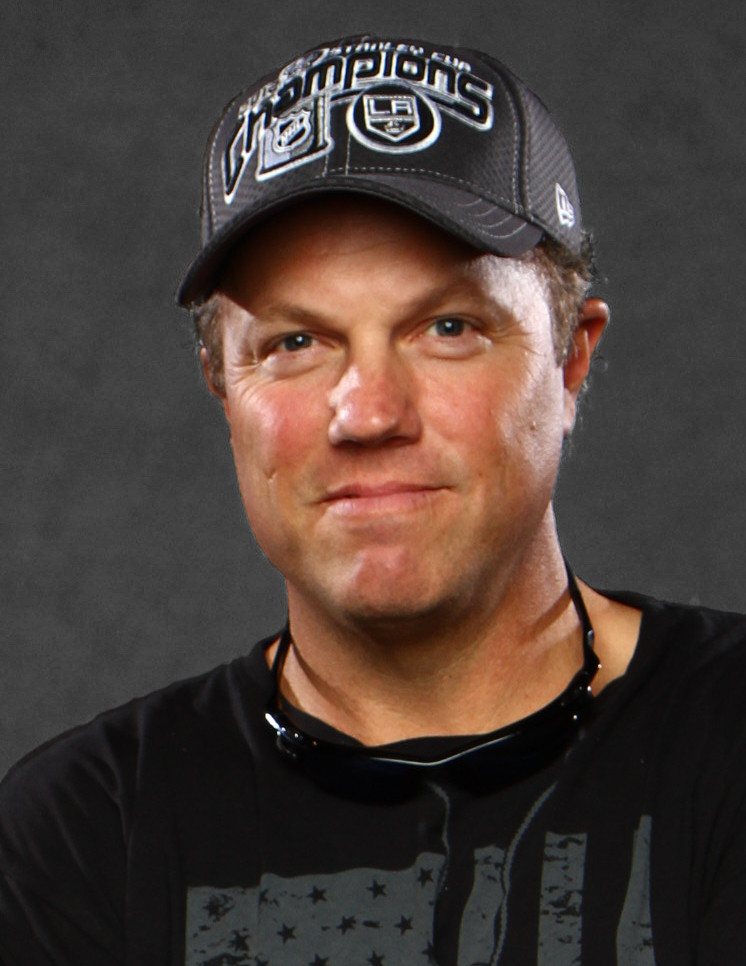
Adam Baldwin

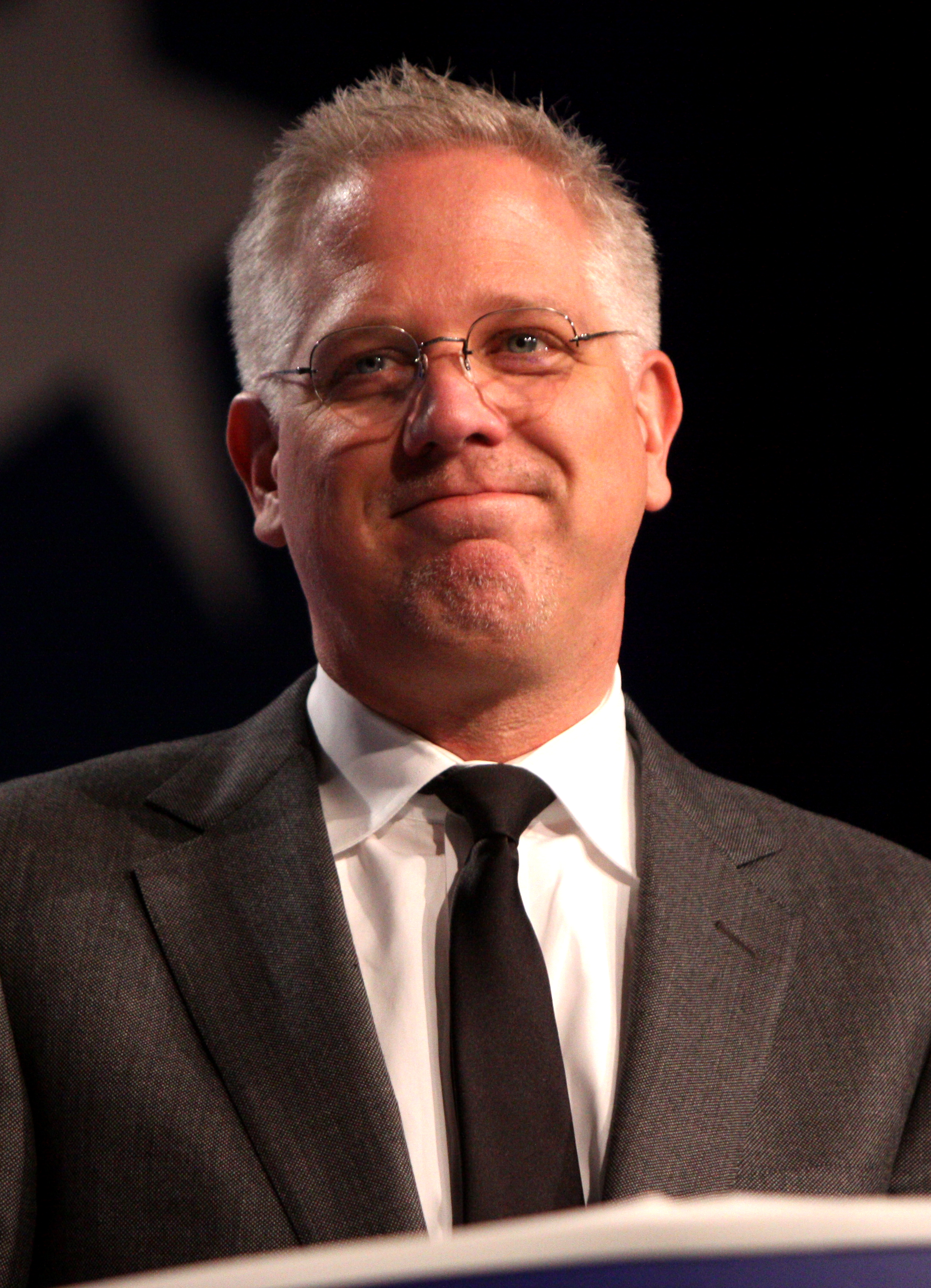
Glenn Beck

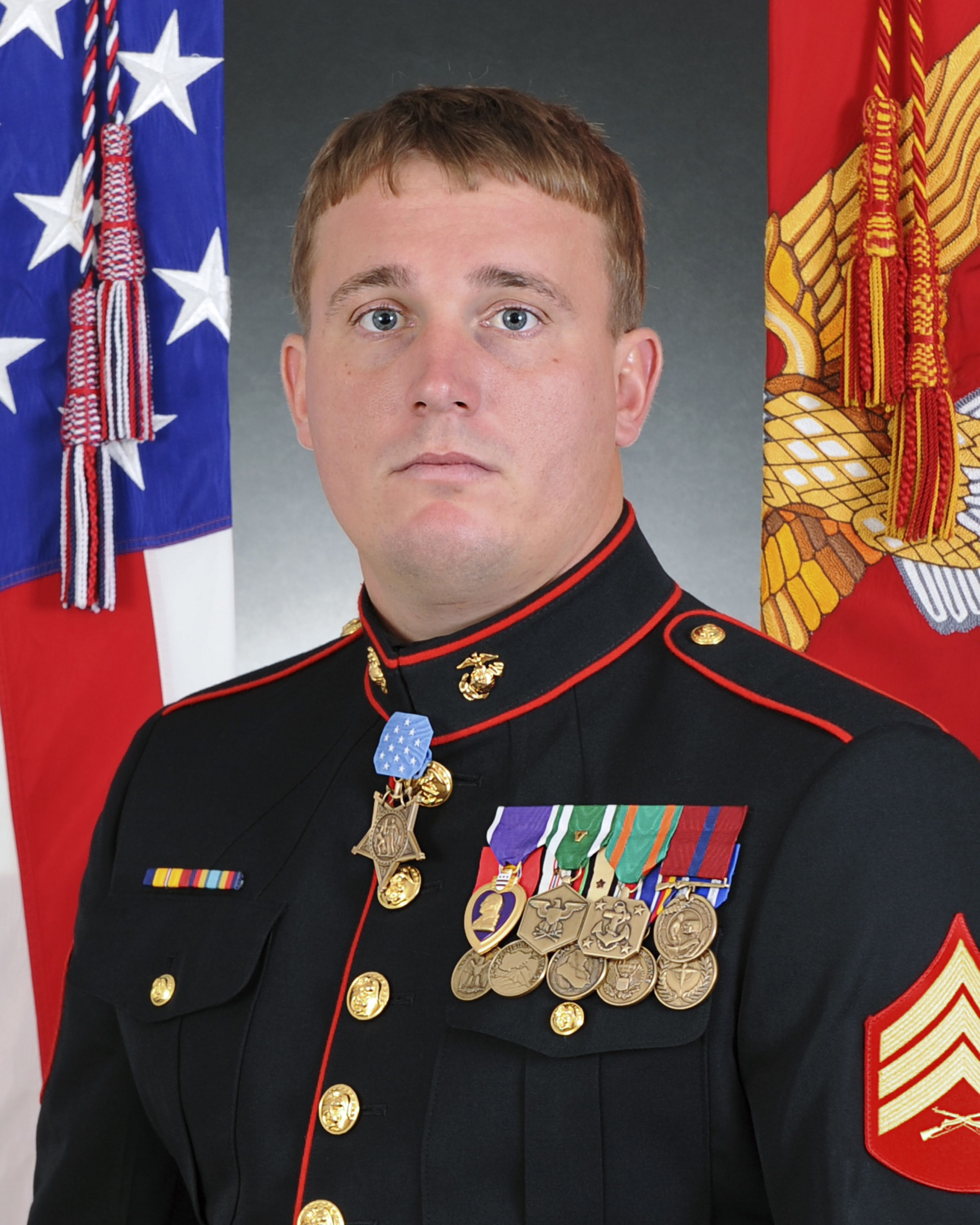
Dakota Meyer

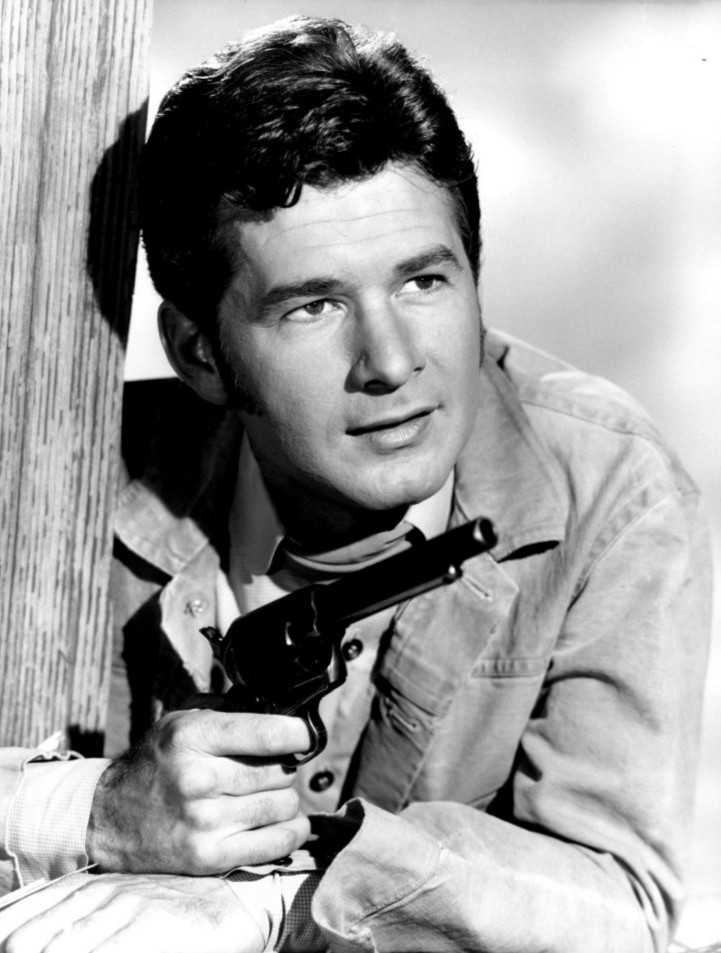
Gary Clarke

- Gus Alzona, realtor, CPA, consultant, musician, elected Member of the Montgomery County Maryland Republican Central Committee, first elected official in Maryland to endorse Ted Cruz for president, August 6, 2016
- Robin Armstrong, former vice chairman of the Republican Party of Texas
- Adam Baldwin, actor
- Gary Bauer, conservative activist; unsuccessful presidential candidate, 2000
- Steven Bauer, actor
- Glenn Beck, conservative/libertarian activist, columnist, founder of 9-12 Project
- The Benham Brothers, former MLB players and TV hosts
- Mike Bickle, evangelical leader
- William G. Boykin, former lieutenant general
- L. Brent Bozell III, conservative activist, columnist, president, Media Research Center
- Brian S. Brown, president of the National Organization for Marriage
- Don Brown, former U.S. Navy JAG officer, bestselling author of the Navy Justice series and Call Sign Extortion 17
- Michael L. Brown, Messianic Jewish theology professor, columnist, and radio host
- C. L. Bryant, conservative African-American radio talk show host, pastor Shreveport, Louisiana
- Keli Carender, initial activist for Tea Party movement
- Adam Carolla, radio and television host
- Paul Chappell, college president and pastor
- Lynne Cheney, author, scholar and wife of former vice president Dick Cheney
- Lionel Chetwynd, script writer
- Gary Clarke, actor
- James Dobson, founder of Focus on the Family
- Cynthia Dunbar,
- John Eastman, law professor and constitutional law scholar
- Erick Erickson, columnist and radio host
- R. Lee Ermey, actor and former Marine
- de:Carol Everett, anti-abortion activist, president of the Heidi Group
- Joseph Farah, editor-in-chief of WorldNetDaily
- Michael Farris, Chancellor of Patrick Henry College
- Ben Ferguson, conservative political commentator
- Ric Flair, wrestler
- William R. Forstchen, historian and author
- Kabeer Gbaja-Biamila, former Green Bay Packers defensive
- Pamela Geller, activist
- Robert P. George, professor of jurisprudence at Princeton University
- Steve Gill, conservative talk radio host
- C. Boyden Gray, former US diplomat (previously endorsed Jeb Bush)
- Jonathan Hoenig, founding member of the Capitalist Pig Hedge Fund
- Clint Howard, actor
- E. W. Jackson, 2013 Republican nominee for Lieutenant Governor of Virginia
- Jerry A. Johnson, president of National Religious Broadcasters
- Bob Jones III, third president of Bob Jones University
- Jason Jones, film-maker
- Robert Koons, professor of Philosophy at the University of Texas
- Taya Kyle, widow of Navy SEAL sniper Chris Kyle and former Rick Perry supporter
- David Limbaugh, political commentator
- Dana Loesch, radio host
- Marcus Luttrell, former Navy Seal, actor and former Rick Perry supporter
- David Mamet, writer-director, playwright
- Jenny Beth Martin, co-founder and national coordinator of Tea Party Patriots
- Dakota Meyer, Medal of Honor recipient and veterans' advocate
- Andrew C. McCarthy, columnist and national security expert
- Gavin McInnes, Canadian writer, far-right political commentator, founder of the Proud Boys
- Michael McIver, publisher, Texas Conservative Digest
- Kayla Moore, president of the Foundation for Moral Law
- Len Munsil, president of Arizona Christian University
- Penny Nance, president of Concerned Women for America
- Troy Newman, anti-abortion activist
- Barbara Nicolosi, screenwriter
- Twila Paris, musician
- CJ Pearson, conservative activist (previously endorsed Rand Paul)
- Tony Perkins, president of the Family Research Council and Republican former member of the Louisiana House of Representatives
- Everett Piper, President of Oklahoma Wesleyan University
- Daniel Pipes, founder and president of the Middle East Forum
- Dan Proft, radio talk show host
- Tyler Ricks (formerly with the Ted Cruz campaign)
- Sandy Rios, Director of Governmental Affairs for American Family Association
- Phil Robertson, hunter, businessman, and reality TV star of Duck Dynasty
- Jeff Roe (campaign manager for Ted Cruz's 2016 presidential campaign)
- Gayle Ruzicka, state leader, Utah Eagle Forum
- Debbie Schlussel, talk radio host and political commentator
- Virginia Thomas, attorney and founder of Liberty Consulting
- Michael Uhlmann, professor of government at Claremont Graduate University
- Bob Vander Plaats, president of the Family Leader
- Richard Viguerie, chairman of ConservativeHQ.com
- Douglas Wilson, pastor
- Peter Wolfgang, executive director of Family Institute of Connecticut
- Chuck Woolery, game show host

== Newspapers and magazines ==
- National Review, semi-monthly magazine
- The New York Sun, daily newspaper based in New York City

== Organizations ==
- American Conservative Party (United States)
- California Republican Assembly
- CatholicVote
- Club for Growth
- Georgia Right to Life
- Gun Owners of America
- National Federation of Republican Assemblies
- National Organization for Marriage
- National Right to Life Committee
- Secure America Now
- Tea Party Patriots Citizens Fund
- Texans for Fiscal Responsibility
- Texas Patriots PAC
- Young Conservatives of Texas
