= Senator Jeffries =

Senator Jeffries may refer to:

- Glenn Jeffries (fl. 2010s–present), West Virginia State Senate
- Peggy Jeffries (born 1940), Arkansas State Senate

== See also ==
- William H. Jeffreys Jr. (1871–1938), Virginia State Senate
