= Governorship of Mike Huckabee =

Mike Huckabee's tenure as the 44th Governor of Arkansas

- Governorship of Mike Huckabee; July 15, 1996 – January 9, 2007
- Party: Republican
- Election: 1998; 2002
- Seat: Governor's Mansion
- Seal of Arkansas

Mike Huckabee served as the third Republican governor of Arkansas since Reconstruction from 1996 to 2007.

== Ascension ==
In 1996, incumbent Democratic governor Jim Guy Tucker was convicted of fraud. The Arkansas Constitution, like nearly all state constitutions in the United States, does not allow convicted felons to hold office, so Tucker was forced to resign. However, Tucker, insisting he had a strong case for appeal, rescinded his resignation as Huckabee was preparing to be sworn in on July 15. Within a few hours, Tucker reinstated his resignation after Huckabee threatened to initiate impeachment proceedings against Tucker. Huckabee was sworn in as Governor of Arkansas on July 15, 1996. In November 1998, Huckabee was elected to a full four-year term by defeating retired Colonel Gene McVay in the primary and Jonesboro attorney Bill Bristow in the general election, becoming the state's third elected Republican governor since Reconstruction. In November 2002, Huckabee was reelected to his second four-year term by defeating State Treasurer Jimmie Lou Fisher, garnering 53 percent of the vote. By the end of his term, Huckabee owned the third-longest tenure of any Arkansas governor. Only Democrats Orval Faubus, who served six consecutive two-year terms (1955–1967), and Bill Clinton, who served 11 years, 11 months (1979–1981; 1983–1992), had longer tenures.

== The first years ==
In late 1996, Huckabee campaigned for ballot Amendment 1, a plan to adjust property tax rules to make school funding more equal across the state, and Amendment 2, a constitutional amendment increasing the state sales tax 0.125 percent to improve the state's park system and natural resources. As part of the campaign, Huckabee traveled the entire length of the Arkansas River within Arkansas by boat. Amendment 1 passed 52%-48% and Amendment 2 passed 51%-49%.

Huckabee proclaimed 1997 as a year of racial reconciliation by saying "Let every one of us make it our priority to bring reconciliation, not so much that we can force it or legislate it, because we cannot, but that we begin in each of our own lives to purpose in our hearts that we will not harbor anger, hostility, prejudice, bigotry and racism toward any person."

Huckabee signed legislation to create a health insurance program which extended coverage to children of lower-income families, to be funded in part by Medicaid, SCHIP, and a tobacco industry lawsuit settlement. The program, ARKids First, reduced the number of uninsured children to nine percent (compared with 12 percent for the nation) in 2003. Also in his first year as governor Huckabee signed a partial birth abortion ban and a $7.6 Million Smart Start program for primary school students to learn "the basic skills of reading, math, and character". Huckabee vetoed a $140 million bill for capital improvements. The Arkansas General Assembly overrode the veto.

Huckabee signed the Child Welfare Agency Licensing Act in 1997. This bill has provisions which allow religious groups to contract for social services with the state without having to compromise their principles. An excerpt reads,

Provided that the health, safety and welfare of children in the care of a child welfare agency is not endangered, nothing in this act shall be construed to permit the Board to promulgate or enforce any rule that has the effect of: (A) interfering with the religious teaching or instruction offered by a child welfare agency; (B) infringing upon the religious beliefs of the holder(s) of a child welfare agency license; (C) infringing upon the right of an agency operated by a religious organization to consider creed in any decision or action relating to admitting or declining to admit a child or family for services; (D) infringing upon the parents' right to consent to a child's participating in prayer or other religious practices while in the care of the child welfare agency; (E) prohibiting the use of corporal discipline.

Huckabee made sure that state agencies were compliant with charitable choice. His administration issued guidelines in October 2000, which allow religious groups to offer voluntary religious programs and to leave their religious artifacts on the walls as long as welfare clients are not pressured to convert and tax money doesn't directly underwrite them. Religious groups are allowed to reject a job candidate on religious grounds. The guidelines also guarantee that any client can receive alternative placement if the client objects to a religious provider.

In a February 1998 presidential straw poll of 65 Christian Coalition leaders, Huckabee came in second to John Ashcroft and ahead of Steve Forbes, J. C. Watts and George W. Bush.

On May 22, 1998, the Arkansas Ethics Commission fined Huckabee US$1,000 for failing to report campaign payments made to himself and his wife. In October 1998 the Arkansas Times suggested Huckabee used a fund set up for the maintenance of the Governor's Mansion for his own personal use. The Arkansas Times later reported Huckabee was listed as the recipient of furniture given to the Governor's Mansion and not the Mansion itself. Tom Mars, Huckabee's attorney, denied any misuse or inappropriate actions.

=== Sentence commutations ===
==== Wayne DuMond case ====
Huckabee has come under criticism for his handling of the case of Wayne DuMond (also spelled Dumond), a convicted rapist who was released during Huckabee's governorship. Despite a crude castration and a professed religious conversion in prison, DuMond subsequently sexually assaulted and murdered a woman in Missouri. DuMond's case had attracted national attention in the mid-1990s from critics of President Clinton who felt that Clinton, Arkansas governor at the time of the rape, had been too harsh with DuMond because DuMond's victim was a distant Clinton relative. Clinton had recused himself from any involvement in the case. Before taking office, Huckabee met with DuMond's wife and privately announced his intention that DuMond be set free, stating his unhappiness with the way Clinton handled the case.

On September 20, 1996, Huckabee publicly announced his intention of commuting DuMond's sentence to time served. DuMond had originally been sentenced to life plus twenty years in prison, but in 1992, Tucker reduced the sentence to 39½ years, which gave DuMond the possibility of parole. Although there was strong pressure to commute DuMond's sentence from Clinton critics ill-informed by the New York Post columns of Steve Dunleavy, a close friend and writer for Rupert Murdoch, there was also strong opposition to Huckabee's plan from DuMond's victims, female Arkansas legislators, and various law enforcement officials, leaving Huckabee in a difficult situation politically.

On October 31, 1996, Huckabee met privately with the parole board to talk about the DuMond case. The Arkansas Times has argued that this closed-door meeting appeared to violate Arkansas' FOIA law. On January 16, 1997, DuMond was granted parole, just five months after he had been rejected. Huckabee released a statement saying, "I concur with the board's action and hope the lives of all those involved can move forward. The action of the board accomplishes what I sought to do in considering an earlier request for commutation ... In light of the action of the board, my original intent to commute the sentence to time served is no longer relevant." The parole was granted on the condition that DuMond leave the state. He moved to Smithville, Missouri, in 1999 and was later convicted there of sexually assaulting and murdering a woman who lived near his home. DuMond was also a suspect in the murder of a pregnant woman in Platte County, Missouri. DuMond died in prison in 2005. Pulaski County Prosecuting Attorney Larry Jegley has argued Huckabee granted too many clemencies.

In 2005, The Arkansas Times reported on the role that Huckabee played in the parole board's decision.

When questioned about the case during his presidential campaign in 2007, Huckabee denied pressuring any parole board members to release DuMond, despite three of the parole board members stating that they felt he did pressure them to do so. Huckabee's official website states: "Governor Huckabee either denied Wayne DuMond's clemency request, or took no action (which is the same as a denial) on four separate occasions." The website states that it was Governor Jim Tucker who "made Wayne DuMond immediately eligible for parole", which, his website says, is granted by the parole board and not by the governor.

=== Maurice Clemmons case ===
In an unrelated matter, Huckabee also commuted the sentence of Maurice Clemmons, the primary person of interest in the November 29, 2009, murders of four Lakewood, Washington police officers, because Clemmons was 17 at the time of his offenses.

== First full term ==
In January 1999, Huckabee joined the presidential exploratory committee of Lamar Alexander. Later, Huckabee endorsed George W. Bush. The Washington Post reported in February 2000,

"This is a guy who gets things done," said Arkansas Gov. Mike Huckabee. "The more people get to know George Bush, the more than are going to get to like him."

On April 1, 1999, Huckabee signed into law a three cent increase in tax on gasoline and a four cent increase on diesel. Attached to the bill was a bond issue to pay for highway construction. The Commercial Appeal reported: "All the diesel money will be earmarked to pay off the bonds or, if the bond issue fails, to directly finance repairs to the interstates. The gasoline tax money will finance work on non-interstate state roads, notably projects approved in a 1991 road program that without new money remains seven years from completion. Should the bond issue fail, the taxes would remain in place, lessening the chances that the trucking industry will campaign against the bonds." Huckabee commented that the bond issue "won't affect taxes, it will only affect construction acceleration".

Huckabee led a public relations campaign for the bond program for road reconstruction. Arkansas voters approved Huckabee's program. In 1999, the Arkansas Comprehensive Testing, Assessment and Accountability Program (ACTAAP) was established. Huckabee modeled ACTAAP after K-12 programs in other states:

I've been fortunate to become friends with Gov. Jim Hunt of North Carolina and Gov. George W. Bush of Texas. They've shared their comprehensive assessment and accountability programs. We now have statewide academic standards that allow us to set clear teaching objectives. We have statewide assessments linked to those standards. We have accountability systems with consequences for schools that fail to perform.

Subsequent legislation amended ACTAAP to conform to No Child Left Behind. Later, in 2005, Huckabee stated,

And one thing I salute about [George W. Bush] is No Child Left Behind, and no matter what you've heard about it let me tell you it's the best thing that ever happened in education because it says we're not going to let children spend years and years and let taxpayers spend thousands and thousands of dollars only to find out when the kid graduates high school that he's basically a functional illiterate, that we're not going to leave him lingering back in those classrooms and that he or she will get a decent education and we will hold accountable those who are responsible for getting that child a good education.

In July 1999, Huckabee hosted a $500-a-plate fundraiser for Rudy Giuliani's campaign for US Senate in Little Rock.

Rather than funnel 100 percent of the state's tobacco settlement revenues into the general fund, Huckabee campaigned to put it in the state's health care system.

On March 7, 2001, Huckabee signed a tax on private nursing homes for $5.25 per day per non-Medicare patient. However, Huckabee was named "Friend of a Taxpayer" by Americans for Tax Reform for his cut in statewide spending.

On April 11, 2001, Huckabee signed the "Covenant Marriage Act", a marriage contract option that compels couples to seek counseling if problems develop during the marriage, provides limited grounds for divorce or separation, and restricts lawsuits against spouses. Huckabee said the law, "offers couples a chance to be held to a higher level of marital commitment". He and his wife converted to a covenant marriage in 2004.

In 2001 Huckabee urged student districts to allow students to pray and proclaimed October as "Student Religious Liberty Month".

Later in 2001, his refusal to raise taxes in the face of a budget shortfall sparked criticism from lawmakers and the media. However, the Club for Growth argues Huckabee increased state spending 65.3 percent (1996–2004) and supported five tax increases. In response, Huckabee said he doubled the standard deduction and the child care tax credit, eliminated the marriage penalty and the capital gains tax on the sale of a home, and reduced the capital gains tax for both businesses and individuals. Ernest Dumas of the Arkansas Times, a consistent Huckabee critic, responded most of the tax cuts were small deductions and exemptions initiated by the state legislature, that the broad-based tax cut was proposed by his predecessor and Huckabee was "the biggest taxer and spender in Arkansas history". Former Arkansas State Representative Randy Minton (R) has said; "[Huckabee's] support for taxes split the Republican Party, and damaged our name brand." The group has pointed out that Huckabee publicly opposed the repeal of a sales tax on groceries and medicine in 2002, signed a bill raising taxes on gasoline in 1999, and signed a $5.25 bed-tax on private nursing home patients in 2001.

In 2002, Huckabee ran for governor and his wife Janet ran for Arkansas Secretary of State. The New York Times reported this set off an "avalanche of criticism". A Republican state representative, Jake Files of Fort Smith, commented, "'That's just a lot of power in one family's hands" Mike Huckabee later stated that his wife tried to recruit other Republican candidates willing to run for Secretary of State. But no one else was willing, so she ran herself. Mike Huckabee won his race with 53 percent of the vote, while his wife Janet lost her race by 62% to 38%.

== Second full term ==
On November 21, 2002, the Arkansas Supreme Court declared the state's school funding procedure was unconstitutional and ordered to produce a fair system. Huckabee proposed a plan to consolidate schools districts of less than 1,500 students. The plan would have consolidated 310 schools districts into 107-116 schools districts with a more centralized administrative and governance network. The legislature instead passed a plan in January 2004 to consolidate school districts of less than 350 students. The issue would resurface when the Arkansas Supreme Court ruled again on school funding in December 2005.

On April 11, 2003, Huckabee signed a law which mandates annual body mass index (BMI) measurements for all public school children. The results are reported to parents with information about how to combat obesity. The law also sets up advisory committees to promote exercise and good nutrition for schools. On May 8, 2003, Huckabee signed into law increases in cigarette and tobacco taxes as well as a three percent income tax surcharge.

In July 2003, Roby Brock reached a settlement with Huckabee and the Arkansas Educational Television Network. Brock had filed a lawsuit alleging that the defendants had conspired to remove his television program from the air.

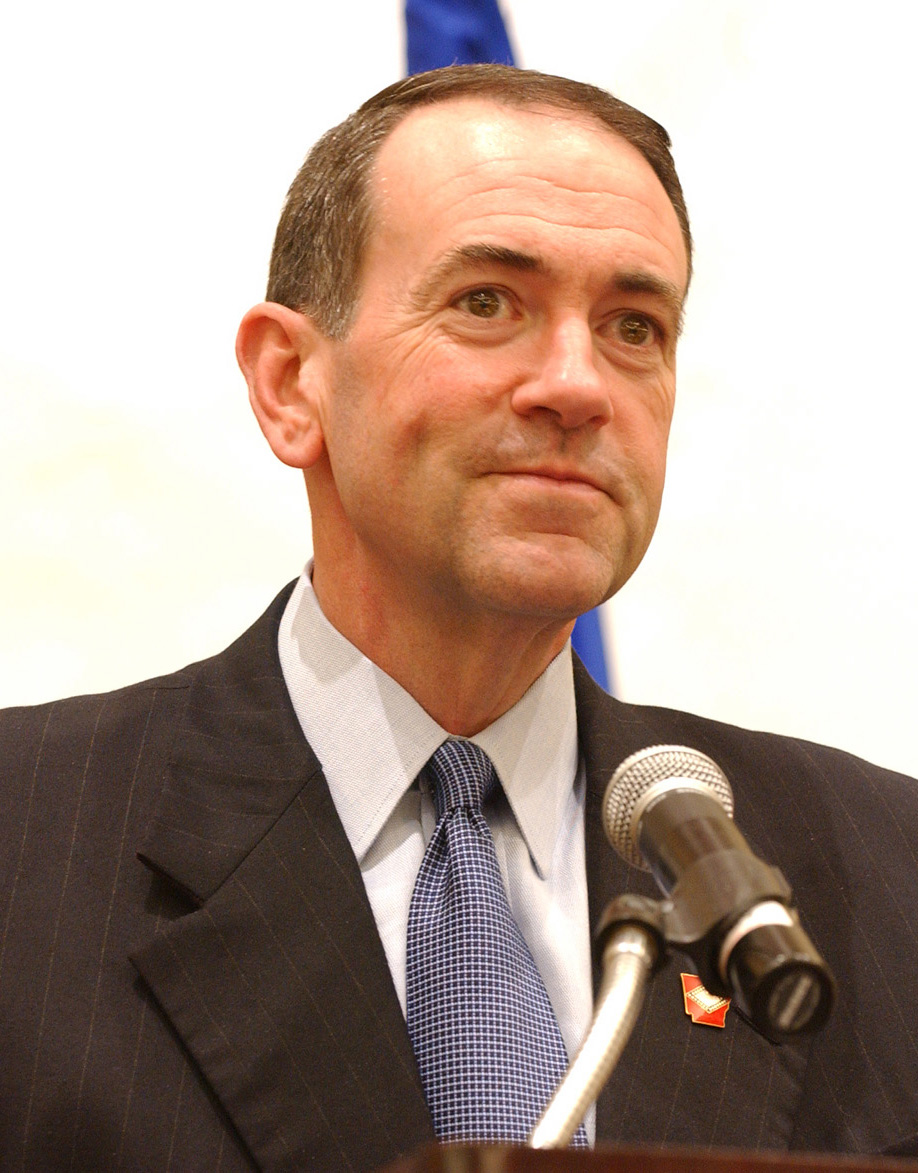
Huckabee in 2004

Huckabee supported a 2005 bill by Arkansas State Representative Joyce Elliott to make some illegal immigrants eligible for scholarships and in-state college tuition, while vehemently opposing a bill sponsored by Arkansas State Senator Jim Holt which would deny state benefits to illegal immigrants, calling it "un-Christian".

In opening remarks among Hispanic civil rights leaders at a LULAC convention, Huckabee said the nation will need to address the concerns of the Hispanic community because of its growing influence and population base. "Pretty soon, Southern white guys like me may be in the minority", Huckabee said jokingly as the crowd roared in laughter. He told the LULAC delegates that their presence in the state's capital city was very important because Arkansas has one of the fastest growing Hispanic populations in the nation. "Your gathering is so very significant for our state", Huckabee said.

In April 2005, Huckabee vetoed a bill which would have allowed public drinking of alcohol in entertainment districts.

After Hurricane Katrina made landfall in August 2005, an estimated 70,000 evacuees fled to Arkansas and Huckabee ordered state agencies to take care of them. State parks offered discounts, waived pet restrictions, and bumped other reservations in favor of evacuees. Pharmacists were given emergency authority to dispense prescriptions and provide access to dialysis machines. Shelters opened up in nearly every portion of the state, and Huckabee requested that the entire state be declared a disaster area. It was not. Many of these shelters, either closed or set to close, were reopened or kept open to process a "second wave" of Katrina evacuees moved from Texas in the wake of arriving Hurricane Rita. (See also Hurricane Katrina disaster relief).

In 2005, Huckabee, supported by then-Arkansas Attorney General Mike Beebe, opposed efforts by Oklahoma Attorney General Drew Edmondson to reduce water pollution. Edmondson had sued Arkansas poultry companies alleging that chicken waste fouled Oklahoma rivers explaining, "You can't stand on the Arkansas side of the border, dump toxins into the river and wash your hands of the problem." Huckabee accused Edmondson of "political gamesmanship", later Edmondson, in 2006, called Huckabee "a poultry company apologist". Huckabee went to Oklahoma to campaign against Edmondson in the 2006 election.

In early 2006, Huckabee– along with fellow governors Rick Perry (R-TX); Jim Doyle (D-WI); and Dave Freudenthal (D-WY)– went on a week-long visit to the Middle East and South Asia as part of a Department of Defense-funded trip to provide the state leaders with an idea of the conditions under which American forces are serving. While visiting Baghdad and Tikrit, Huckabee and the governors received briefings from Gen. George Casey and Amb. Zalmay Khalilzad.

In November 2006, both Huckabee and his wife drew criticism for creating wedding registries in the amount of over $6000 at both the Target and Dillard's web sites, in conjunction with a housewarming party to celebrate a new house they had purchased in Little Rock. The Arkansas Times, which first reported the story, noted that wedding gifts represent one of the exceptions to a $100 cap on gifts to political leaders under Arkansas law. Huckabee said that the registries were intended only for those who were invited to the event, that he was not involved in organizing the event, and that they were classified as wedding registries only because those sites did not have separate categories for housewarming parties.

Throughout his tenure as governor, welfare enrollment declined by nearly half. During his last year in office the state's economy grew 4.4%, beating the national average of 4.2%.

Shortly before announcing his candidacy for the President of the United States, Huckabee ordered that the drives of 83 computers and 4 servers be destroyed during his transition phase in leaving office. According to Claire Bailey, director of the Arkansas Department of Information Systems, the governor's office chose a combination of writing over the data and destroying the hard drives. Huckabee said that the decision to crush the hard drives was made in order to "protect the privacy of those who had personal information on the drives". Critics, however, recalled that early in Huckabee's term as governor, documents, e-mails and memos stored on hard drives formed the basis of embarrassing stories about Huckabee, including the allegations regarding personal use of the Governor's Mansion funds.

In 2005, Time magazine named him one of the five best governors in the U.S., writing "Huckabee has approached his state's troubles with energy and innovation". The Club for Growth accuses Huckabee of being a liberal in disguise, saying Huckabee increased state spending 65.3 percent (1996–2004) and supported five tax increases. The Arkansas Department of Finance and Administration states during Huckabee's tenure, taxes were cut ninety times for a decrease of $378 million, while taxes were raised twenty-one times for an increase of $883 million. Arkansas Health Care Association President Jim Cooper stated the private nursing home tax was necessary in order to avert future huge tax increases as a result of years of mismanagement.

On December 26, 2007, the conservative organization Judicial Watch announced that Mike Huckabee was named to its list of Washington's "Ten Most Wanted Corrupt Politicians" for 2007. They state that Huckabee, as governor, was the subject of "14 ethics complaints and a volley of questions about his integrity, ranging from his management of campaign cash to his use of a nonprofit organization to subsidize his income to his destruction of state computer files on his way out of the governor's office." Judicial Watch further accused Huckabee of attempting to block the state ethics commission's investigations of the allegations.

The Cato Institute, a libertarian non-profit public policy research foundation, gave Huckabee an "F" for spending and tax policy in 2006. Huckabee has asserted he did not raise spending significantly in areas he could control and in those areas spending rose six-tenths of one percent a year during his entire governance. He also signed the first broad-based tax cut in Arkansas's history. For 2006, he says that his state enjoyed a surplus of nearly $850 million. In January 2008, Huckabee repeated this assertion, while also pointing out that at the beginning of his term Arkansas had a $200 million deficit. However, during his tenure, the state's general obligation debt increased by almost $1 billion.

At the end of his final term, Governor Huckabee pardoned Rolling Stone Keith Richards of a traffic offense in Arkansas 32 years prior.
