= Tim Brown (Indiana politician) =

American politician from Indiana (born 1956)

Member of the Indiana House of Representatives from the 41st district
- In office November 9, 1994 – November 22, 2022
- Preceded by: Dan Pool
- Succeeded by: Mark Genda

Personal details
- Born: May 29, 1956 (age 70) Bloomington, Illinois, U.S.
- Party: Republican
- Spouse: Jane
- Children: 4
- Education: Illinois Wesleyan University (BA); University of Illinois (MD)
- Occupation: Politician

Timothy Neal Brown (born May 29, 1956) is an American politician who is a Republican member of the Indiana House of Representatives, representing the 41st District since 1994. He was elected to chair of the House Ways and Means Committee in 2012. On September 12, 2018, Brown was injured in a motorcycle accident. He retired from political life in 2022.
