= Stephen Darrow =

American politician

Member of the New Hampshire House of Representatives from the 17th Grafton district
- In office December 3, 2014 – December 5, 2018
- Preceded by: Catherine Mulholland
- Succeeded by: Joshua Adjutant

Personal details
- Party: Republican

Stephen Darrow is an American politician. He served as a Republican member for the Grafton 17th district of the New Hampshire House of Representatives. He was first elected in 2014. He was reelected in 2016. He lost reelection in 2018.
