= Randy Minton =

American politician

Member of the Arkansas House of Representatives from the 69th district
- In office January 11, 1999 – January 13, 2003
- Preceded by: David Choate
- Succeeded by: Phillip Jacobs

Personal details
- Born: March 8, 1951 (age 75) Jacksonville, Arkansas
- Party: Republican

Randy Minton (born March 8, 1951) is an American politician who served in the Arkansas House of Representatives from the 69th district from 1999 to 2003.
