= Endorsements in the 2016 Republican Party presidential primaries =

This is a list of notable political endorsements for declared candidates for the Republican primaries for the 2016 United States presidential election. Endorsements are part of the "invisible primary" process, which occurs not only long before the general election, but also largely occurs before even the caucuses and primaries have begun.

Early endorsements were correlated with the success candidates achieved in caucuses and primaries, for elections from 1980 through 2004. (See the UCLA School of Political Parties.) Historically, there has been a correlation ("76% of the eventual vote percentage") between the percentage of political endorsements from sitting and former elected officials earned by a Republican candidate in the first half of the year prior to a presidential election (for the purposes of this article, January–June, 2015), with the percentage of votes cast for that candidate in Republican primaries during the first half of the election year (i.e., January–June, 2016).

The value of political endorsements varies, depending on whom they are from, when they are given, and other factors. Endorsements from politicians who live in states with early primaries are highly sought after. So are endorsements from governors, federal senators, and federal representatives. Endorsements from people from the candidate's home state are less valuable, unless multiple candidates from that state are running. The impact of celebrity endorsements of political candidates is less clear, but can increase general election turnout, or increase fundraising totals and media exposure.

== Donald Trump (won presidency) ==
Background: Donald Trump (born in New York in 1946 and raised there) is a real estate CEO (1971–present), with investments in New York, Florida, and several other states and countries. He is an author (1987–present) and television personality (2003–2015).

== Jeb Bush (withdrawn) ==
Background: Jeb Bush (born in 1953) was the 43rd Governor of Florida (1999–2007). He was raised in Texas, where his brother, George was governor (1995–2000) and his father, George H. W. Bush, was a representative (1967–1971). He was a Texas banker (1974–1979) and Florida real estate developer (1980–1986) before entering politics. He suspended his campaign on February 21, 2016, and endorsed Ted Cruz on March 23, 2016.

== Ben Carson (withdrawn) ==
Background: Dr. Ben Carson (born in 1951) was a Maryland brain surgeon and professor (1984–2013). He was raised in Michigan. He is an author, speaker, and runs a scholarship fund. He also served on the board of directors for Kellogg and Costco Wholesale Corporation for 18 and 16 years respectively. He suspended his campaign on March 4 and later endorsed Trump on March 11.

== Chris Christie (withdrawn) ==
Chris Christie (born in 1962) has been Governor of New Jersey since 2010. He was raised in New Jersey. He was a lawyer in New Jersey (1987–2002) before entering politics. He was elected Morris County legislator in 1995 and served until 1998. In 2002, he was appointed by George W. Bush to the position of United States Attorney for New Jersey, he held this position until 2008. On February 10, 2016, he suspended his campaign. He later endorsed Trump on the 26th.

== Ted Cruz (withdrawn) ==
Background: Ted Cruz (born in 1970) is a Texas U.S. Senator (2013–present). Born in Calgary, Alberta, Canada, he was raised in Texas. He was a Texas lawyer (1997–98) before entering politics. He suspended his campaign on May 3, 2016, and eventually endorsed Trump.

== Carly Fiorina (withdrawn) ==
Background: Carly Fiorina (born in 1954) was CEO of HP/Compaq in 1999–2005, and an east coast manager at AT&T/Lucent (1980–1999). She was raised in multiple states. She led the CIA External Advisory Board (2007–2009), was the 2010 U.S. Senate nominee in California, and runs several organizations. On February 10, 2016, she suspended her campaign and endorsed Ted Cruz on March 9, 2016.

== Jim Gilmore (withdrawn) ==
Background: Jim Gilmore (born in 1949) was Governor of Virginia (1998–2002), and ran for president in 2008. He was raised in Virginia. He was an overseas Army Intel officer (1971–1974) and Virginia lawyer (1977–1987) before entering politics.

== Lindsey Graham (withdrawn) ==
Background: Lindsey Graham (born in 1955) was a U.S. Senator from South Carolina (2003–2026). He was raised in South Carolina. He was a lawyer (USAF overseas [1982–89], privately in South Carolina (1989–1992) before entering politics. He withdrew on December 21, 2015. He first endorsed Jeb Bush on January 15, 2016, and then endorsed Ted Cruz on March 17, 2016.

== Mike Huckabee (withdrawn) ==
Background: Mike Huckabee (born in 1955) was Governor of Arkansas from 1996 to 2007, and ran for president in 2008. He was raised in Arkansas. He was a minister (1980–1992) before entering politics, an author (1997–2015), and television host (2008–2015). He suspended his campaign February 1, 2016, after the Iowa Caucus.

== Bobby Jindal (withdrawn) ==
Background: Bobby Jindal (born in 1971) is Governor of Louisiana (2008–2016). He was raised in Louisiana. He was a Rhodes Scholar in political science before entering politics. He withdrew on November 17, 2015, and endorsed Marco Rubio on February 5, 2016.

== John Kasich (withdrawn) ==
Background: John Kasich (born in 1952) is Governor of Ohio (2010–present), ran for the Republican presidential nomination in 2000, and was U.S. Representative from Ohio (1983–2001). He was raised in Pennsylvania. He has an Ohio degree in political science before entering politics, then was a television commentator and banker (2001–2008).

== George Pataki (withdrawn) ==
Background: George Pataki (born in 1945) was Governor of New York from 1995 to 2006. He was raised in New York. He was a New York lawyer (1970–1981) before politics. He withdrew on December 29, 2015, and endorsed John Kasich on April 14, 2016, having previously endorsed Marco Rubio on January 26, 2016.

== Rand Paul (withdrawn) ==
Background: Rand Paul (born in 1963) is a U.S. Senator from Kentucky (2010–present). He was raised in Texas, where his father, Ron Paul was a U.S. Representative (1976–1977, 1979–1985, 1997–2013) and presidential candidate (1988/2008/2012). He was a Kentucky eye surgeon (1993–2010) before entering politics. He withdrew on February 3, 2016.

== Rick Perry (withdrawn) ==
Background: Rick Perry (born in 1950) was Governor of Texas from 2000 to 2014, and ran for president in 2012. He was raised in Texas. He was a Texas-and-overseas USAF pilot (1972–1977) and Texas farmer (1977–1984) before entering politics. He withdrew on September 11, 2015, and endorsed Ted Cruz on January 25, 2016.

== Marco Rubio (withdrawn) ==
Background: Marco Rubio (born in 1971) is a U.S. Senator from Florida (2010–present). He was raised in Florida (and Nevada). He was a Florida lawyer (1996–98) before entering politics. On March 15, 2016, Rubio announced he has suspended his campaign.

== Rick Santorum (withdrawn) ==
Background: Rick Santorum (born in 1958) was a Pennsylvania U.S. Senator from 1995 to 2007, and ran for president in 2012. He was raised in Pennsylvania (and West Virginia). He was a Pennsylvania lawyer (1987–1990) before entering politics. He withdrew on February 3, 2016, and endorsed Marco Rubio.

== Scott Walker (withdrawn) ==
Background: Scott Walker (born in 1967) is Governor of Wisconsin (2011–present). He was raised in Wisconsin (and Iowa). He was at Marquette University in politics and economics before entering politics. He withdrew on September 21, 2015, and endorsed Ted Cruz on March 29, 2016.

== Endorsement withholding ==
The intentional withholding of an endorsement (aka "negative endorsement") is a relevant and important category for this topic. At a minimum, it represents the loss of an endorsing entity for a candidate. It also represents the introduction of a minimum threshold. The editorial department of the Deerfield Beach, Florida-based Sun-Sentinel on March 4, 2016, announced that it would endorse no GOP candidates because, it said, "The kind of person who should be running is not in the race".

== See also ==
- Endorsements in the 2016 Democratic Party presidential primaries
