= Peggy Jeffries =

American teacher, politician (born 1940)

Peggy Sue Jeffries (née Newlon; born June 4, 1940) is a former teacher and state legislator in Arkansas. Sue served in the Arkansas Senate from 1995 to 1998. A Republican, she worked on Ted Cruz's presidential campaign.

She was born in St. James, Missouri. She graduated from Fort Smith Senior High School in 1958.
