= 2023 Colorado Springs mayoral election =

- April 4, 2023 (first round); May 16, 2023 (runoff)
- Turnout: 35.15% ▼ (first round); 37.41% ▲ (runoff)
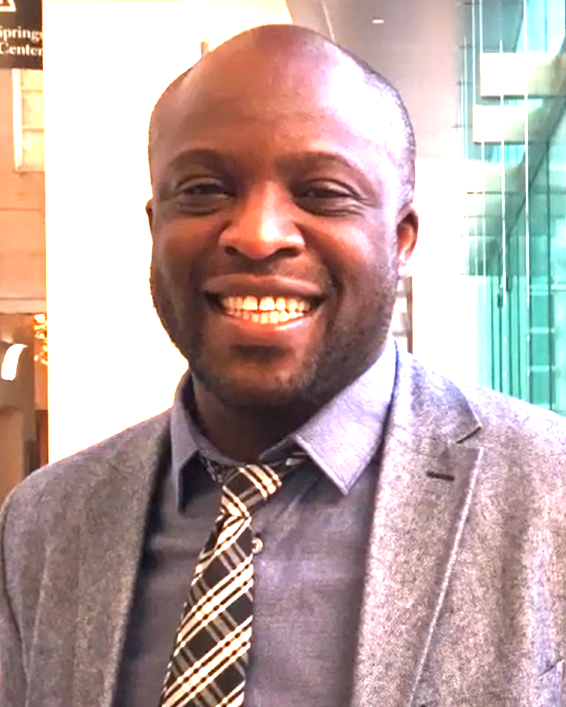

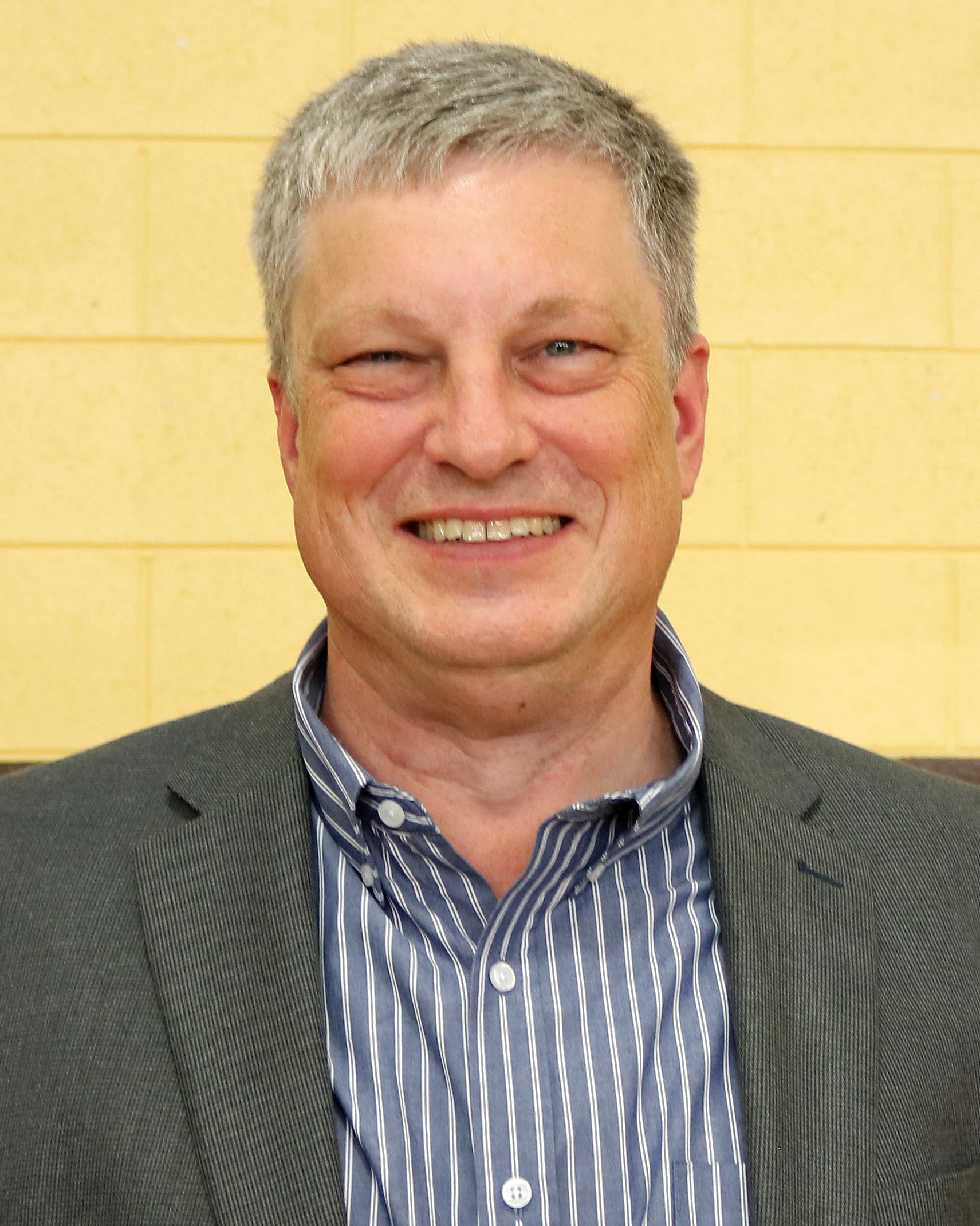

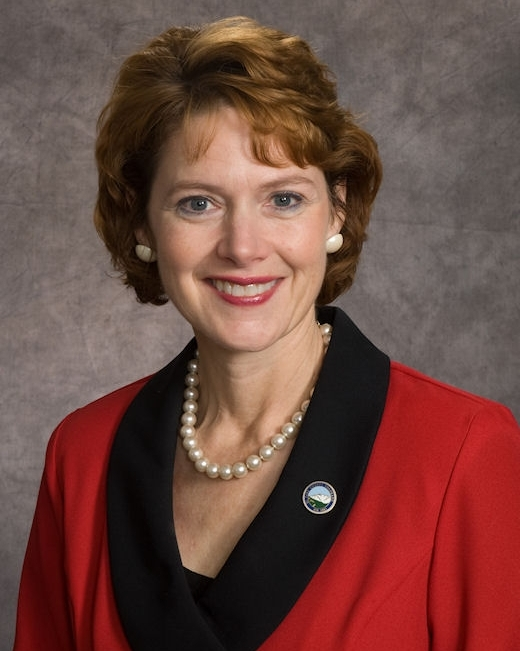
Candidate	Yemi Mobolade	Wayne Williams	Sallie Clark
First round	32,429; 29.8%	20,908; 19.2%	19,384; 17.8%
Runoff	67,442; 57.5%	49,909; 42.5%	Eliminated
Candidate	Darryl Glenn	Longinos Gonzalez Jr.
First round	9,470; 8.7%	8,622; 7.9%
Runoff	Eliminated	Eliminated
Mayor before election
John Suthers
Republican
Elected mayor
Yemi Mobolade
Independent

The 2023 Colorado Springs mayoral election was held on April 4, 2023, to elect the mayor of Colorado Springs, Colorado, with a runoff scheduled for May 16. Incumbent mayor John Suthers was term-limited and could not seek a third term in office. The election was officially nonpartisan.

A wide field of candidates filed to run in the election, including several members of municipal government. Colorado Springs has long been a conservative bastion in the state of Colorado, and none of the candidates running to succeed Suthers identified as members of the Democratic Party. In the first round of voting, no candidate received a majority and the race was forced to a runoff election. Independent Nigerian immigrant and political newcomer Yemi Mobolade advanced to the runoff, along with Republican city councilor and former Colorado Secretary of State Wayne Williams.

Mobolade defeated Williams in the runoff. He became the first elected black mayor of Colorado Springs, as well as the first non-Republican elected (Note: Although Mobolade is the first black and first non-Republican elected mayor of Colorado Springs, he is not the first black person or first non-Republican to serve as mayor; Leon Young, a black Democrat, briefly served as acting mayor in 1997 following the resignation of Bob Isaac.) mayor in the city's history.

== Candidates ==
The following candidates qualified to appear on the ballot. Glenn and Gonzalez were identified as the most conservative candidates in the race, with Strand and Williams being more moderate.

=== Advanced to runoff ===
- Blessing "Yemi" Mobolade, restaurateur and former Colorado Springs Small Business Development administrator (party affiliation: Independent)
- Wayne Williams, at-large city councilor and former Colorado secretary of state (party affiliation: Republican)

=== Eliminated in first round ===
- Sallie Clark, former Colorado director of USDA Rural Development, former El Paso County commissioner, former Colorado Springs city councilor, former president of the National Association of Counties, and candidate for mayor in 1999 and 2003 (party affiliation: Republican)
- Andrew Dalby, RV storage business owner
- Darryl Glenn, Penrose Hospital trustee, former El Paso County commissioner, former Colorado Springs city councilor, nominee for U.S. Senate in 2016, and candidate for CO-05 in 2018 (party affiliation: Republican)
- Longinos Gonzalez Jr., El Paso County commissioner (party affiliation: Republican)
- Lawrence Martinez, hospice home care specialist and perennial candidate
- Jim Miller, tire business owner
- Christopher Mitchell, electrical engineer
- Kallan Rodebaugh, standup comedian
- Tom Strand, president of the Colorado Springs city council (party affiliation: Independent)
- John "Tig" Tiegen, former CIA security contractor

== First round ==
=== Endorsements ===
Sallie Clark (R)

Local officials

- Steve Bach, former mayor of Colorado Springs (2011–2015)
Wayne Williams (R)

Local officials

- John Suthers, mayor of Colorado Springs (2015–2023) and former Colorado attorney general (2005–2015)

Labor unions

- Colorado Springs Police Protective Association
- Colorado Springs Professional Firefighters (IAFF Local 5)

=== Results ===
2023 Colorado Springs mayoral election
Candidate	Votes	%
Yemi Mobolade	32,429	29.81
Wayne Williams	20,908	19.22
Sallie Clark	19,384	17.82
Darryl Glenn	9,470	8.70
Longinos Gonzalez Jr.	8,622	7.93
John Tig Tiegen	5,405	4.97
Andrew Dalby	4,825	4.44
Tom Strand	2,597	2.39
Lawrence Joseph Martinez	1,823	1.68
Christopher Mitchell	1,248	1.15
Kallan Reece Rodebaugh	1,129	1.04
Jim Miller	948	0.87
Total votes	108,788	100.00

== Runoff ==
=== Post-primary endorsements ===
Yemi Mobolade (I)

Federal officials

- Sallie Clark, former Colorado director of USDA Rural Development, former El Paso County commissioner, former Colorado Springs city councilor, former president of the National Association of Counties, and former 2023 mayoral candidate (Republican)

County officials

- Bill Elder, former El Paso County sheriff
- Amy Folsom, former El Paso County Administrator

City officials

- Tom Strand, president of the Colorado Springs city council and former 2023 mayoral candidate
Wayne Williams (R)

Local officials

- Lynette Crow-Iverson, Colorado Springs city councilor
- Dave Donelson, Colorado Springs city councilor
- Randy Helms, Colorado Springs city councilor
- Dave Leinweber, Colorado Springs city councilor
- Mike O'Malley, Colorado Springs city councilor

=== Results ===
2023 Colorado Springs mayoral runoff election
Candidate	Votes	%
Yemi Mobolade	67,442	57.47
Wayne Williams	49,909	42.53
Total votes	117,351	100.00

== See also ==
- List of mayors of Colorado Springs, Colorado
