= 2015 Colorado Springs mayoral election =

- April 7, 2015 (first round); May 19, 2015 (runoff)
- Turnout: 38.61% (first round); 42.58 (runoff)
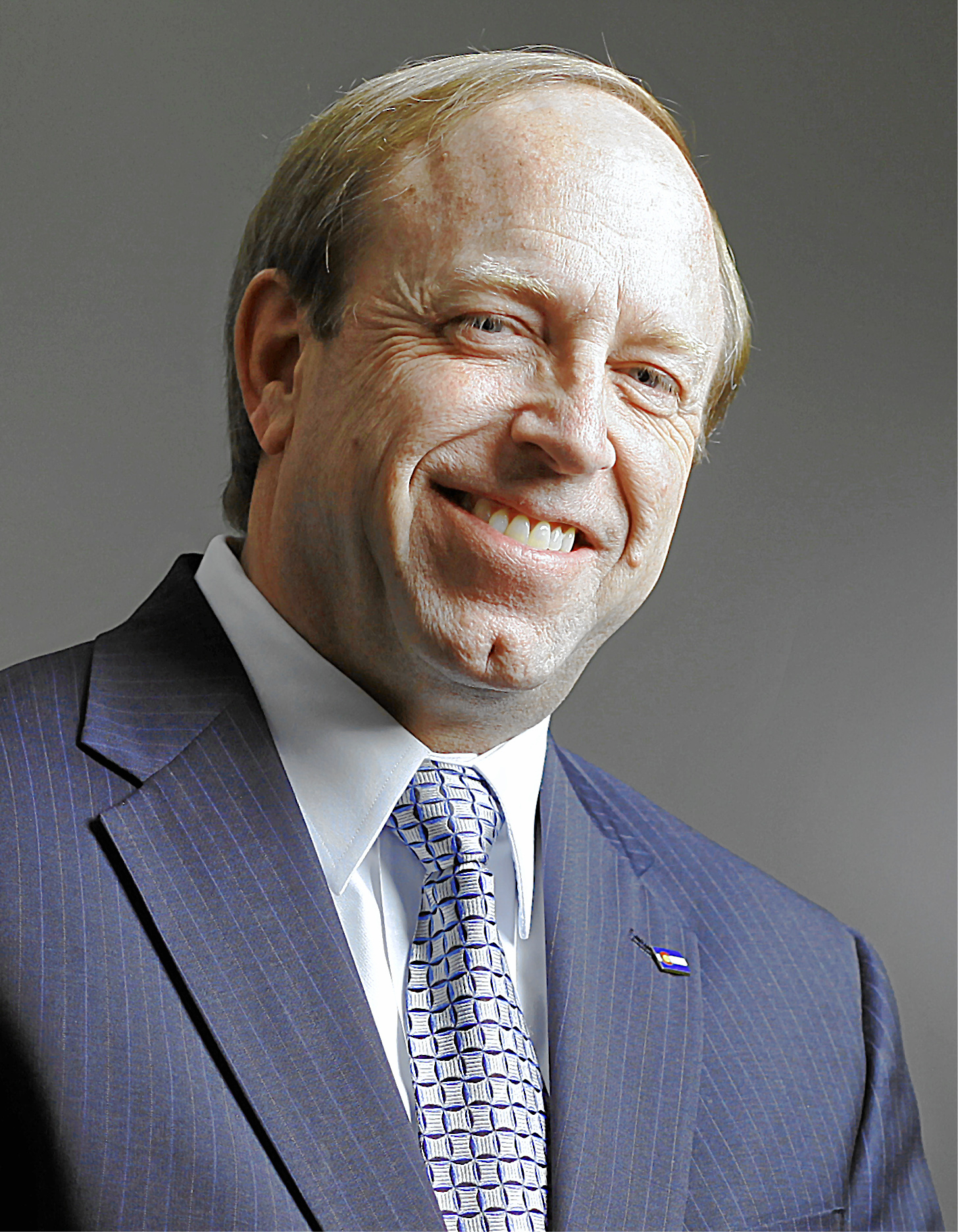

Candidate	John Suthers	Mary Lou Makepeace	Joel Miller
First round vote	40,900	20,783	13,794
First round percentage	46.37%	23.56%	15.64%
Runoff vote	65,991	31,666
Runoff percentage	67.57%	32.43%
Candidate	Amy Lathen
First round vote	10,352
First round percentage	11.74%
Mayor before election
Steve Bach
Republican
Elected mayor
John Suthers
Republican

The 2015 Colorado Springs mayoral election took place on April 7 and May 19, 2015, to elect the mayor of Colorado Springs, Colorado. The election was held concurrently with various other local elections. The election was officially nonpartisan.

Incumbent Mayor Steve Bach, in office since 2011, announced that he would not seek a second term in office.

Since no candidate won a majority of the vote, a runoff was held on May 19 between Mary Lou Makepeace and John Suthers, the top two finishers in the April general election. Suthers defeated Makepeace in the runoff to become mayor.

== Candidates ==
- Tony Carpenter, perennial candidate
- Moses Humes (as a write-in candidate)
- Amy Lathen, El Paso County commissioner
- Mary Lou Makepeace, former mayor
- Lawrence Martinez, community activist
- Joel Miller, former city councilman
- John Suthers, former Colorado attorney general

=== Disqualified ===
- Justine Herring, real estate broker

=== Declined ===
- Steve Bach, incumbent mayor
- Richard Skorman, former city councilman and candidate for mayor in 2011

== General election ==
=== Polling ===
Poll source	Date(s) administered	Sample size	Margin of error	Amy Lathen	Mary Lou Makepeace	Joel Miller	John Suthers	Other	Undecided
Luce Research	February 17–22, 2015	400	± ?	7.75%	22.25%	2%	30%	2%	33.25%

=== Results ===
Colorado Springs mayoral general election, 2015
Party	Candidate	Votes	%
Nonpartisan	John Suthers	40,900	46.37
Nonpartisan	Mary Lou Makepeace	20,783	23.56
Nonpartisan	Joel Miller	13,794	15.64
Nonpartisan	Amy Lathen	10,352	11.74
Nonpartisan	Lawrence Martinez	1,125	1.28
Nonpartisan	Tony Carpenter	1,048	1.19
Nonpartisan	Moses Humes (write-in)	5	0.01
Total votes		88,007	100

== Runoff election ==
=== Candidates ===
- Mary Lou Makepeace, former mayor
- John Suthers, former Colorado attorney general

=== Results ===
Colorado Springs mayoral runoff election, 2015
Party	Candidate	Votes	%
Nonpartisan	John Suthers	65,991	67.57
Nonpartisan	Mary Lou Makepeace	31,666	32.43
Total votes		97,657	100

== See also ==
- List of mayors of Colorado Springs, Colorado
