= 2019 Colorado Springs mayoral election =

- April 2, 2019
- Turnout: 36.30%
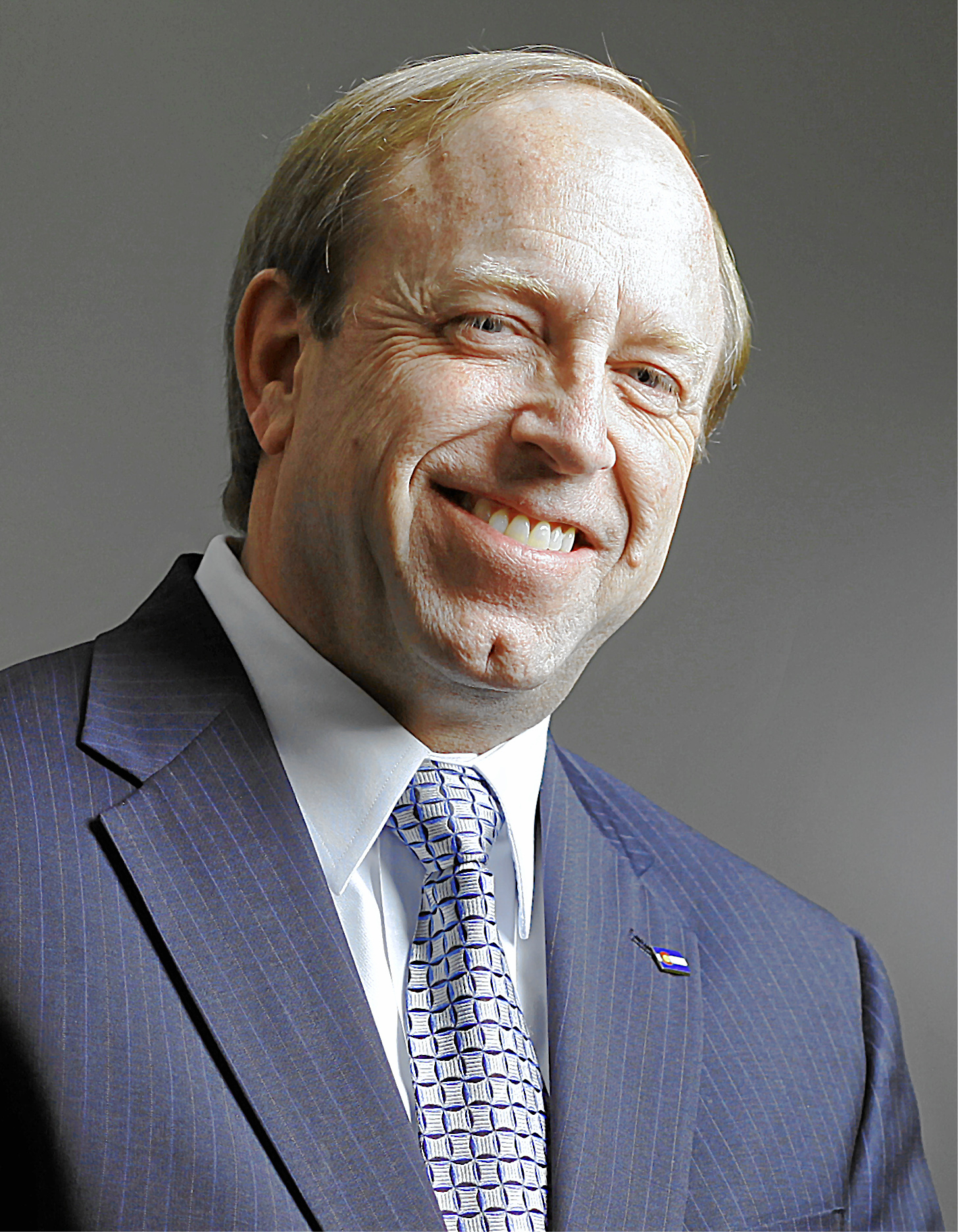

Candidate	John Suthers	Juliette Parker
Popular vote	69,703	11,438
Percentage	72.51%	11.90%
Candidate	John Pitchford	Lawrence Martinez
Popular vote	9,985	5,000
Percentage	10.39%	5.21%
Mayor before election
John Suthers
Republican
Elected mayor
John Suthers
Republican

The 2019 Colorado Springs mayoral election was held on April 2, 2019, to elect the mayor of Colorado Springs, Colorado. The election was officially nonpartisan.

A runoff had been scheduled for May 21, 2019, but John Suthers received enough votes in the general election.

Incumbent mayor Suthers won reelection to a second term.

== Candidates ==
- Lawrence Martinez, candidate in the 2015 Colorado Springs mayoral election
- Juliette Parker
- John Pitchford
- John Suthers, incumbent Republican mayor

== Results ==
Results
Party	Candidate	Votes	%
Nonpartisan	John Suthers (incumbent)	69,771	72.51
Nonpartisan	Juliette Parker	11,453	11.90
Nonpartisan	John Pitchford	9,994	10.39
Nonpartisan	Lawrence Joseph Martinez	5,009	5.21
Total votes		96,227	

== See also ==
- List of mayors of Colorado Springs, Colorado
