= 1997 Colorado Springs mayoral special election =

Colorado Springs mayoral special election, 1997
- April 1, 1997
- Turnout: 28.27%
Candidate	Mary Lou Makepeace	Cheryl Gillaspie	John G. Hazelhurst
Popular vote	29,357	15,320	8,263
Percentage	52.97%	27.64%	14.91%
Mayor before election
Robert M. Isaac
Republican
Elected mayor
Mary Lou Makepeace
Republican

The 1997 Colorado Springs mayoral special election took place on April 1, 1997, to elect the mayor of Colorado Springs, Colorado. The election was triggered by the resigning of incumbent mayor Robert M. Isaac. The election was held concurrently with various other local elections. The election was officially nonpartisan.

== Results ==
Results
Party	Candidate	Votes	%
Nonpartisan	Mary Lou Makepeace	29,357	52.97
Nonpartisan	Cheryl Gillaspie	15,320	27.64
Nonpartisan	John G. Hazlehurst	8,263	14.91
Nonpartisan	Earl Robert Janack	1,342	2.42
Nonpartisan	Andy Walker	1,141	2.06
Total votes		55,423	

== See also ==
- List of mayors of Colorado Springs, Colorado
