= List of mayors of Colorado Springs, Colorado =

The following is a list of mayors of the city of Colorado Springs, Colorado, United States.

- Wm. Wagner, c.1877
- D.W. Robbins, ca.1882
- Finando E. Dow, c.1886
- Wm. M. Strickler, c.1888–1894
- John R. Robinson, c.1900–1901
- Henry Clay Hall, 1905–1907
- H.F. Avery, c.1912
- Charles E. Thomas, c.1919
- Ira Harris, ca.1924
- George M. Taylor, c.1927
- Victor Hungerford, c.1929
- George C. Birdsall, c.1939
- J.N. McCullough, c.1951
- C. Harry Blunt, c.1952–1955
- Fred W. Simpson Jr., c.1959
- Eugene McCleary, 1967–1973
- Andrew Marshall, c.1974
- Larry Ochs, 1975–1979
- Bob Isaac, 1979–1997
- Leon Young, 1997
- Mary Lou Makepeace, 1997–2003
- Lionel Rivera, 2003–2011
- Steve Bach, 2011–2015
- John Suthers, 2015–2023
- Yemi Mobolade, 2023–

== See also ==
- Mayoral elections in Colorado Springs, Colorado: 1995, 1997, 1999, 2003, 2007, 2011, 2015, 2019, 2023
- Colorado Springs City Hall
- Timeline of Colorado Springs, Colorado
