= 2019 Colorado Springs elections =

US local election

The 2019 Colorado Springs elections were held in two segments. The April 2, 2019, elections included mayor of Colorado Springs, three Colorado Springs City Council at-large positions, and one ballot issue. The election on November 5, 2019, included four Colorado Springs School District 11 Board of Education seats.

== Mayor ==
Republican incumbent mayor John Suthers ran for re-election for mayor of Colorado Springs. He was re-elected.

All candidates are confirmed on the Colorado Springs City Clerk website.

=== Declared ===
- Lawrence Martinez
- Juliette Parker
- John Pitchford
- John Suthers

=== Results ===
| Candidate | Votes | % |
| Lawrence Martinez | 5,000 | 5.20% |
| John Pitchford | 9,985 | 10.39% |
| John Suthers | 69,703 | 72.51% |
| Juliette Parker | 11,438 | 11.90% |

== City Council ==
Unaffiliated incumbent city council member Merv Bennett is term-limited and cannot run for another term on the city council. Unaffiliated incumbent city council members Bill Murray and Tom Strand ran for re-election.

All candidates are confirmed on the Colorado Springs City Clerk website.

Wayne Williams and incumbents Bill Murray and Tom Strand were elected to the Colorado Springs City Council.

=== Declared ===
- Regina English
- Tony Gioia
- Gordon Klingenschmitt, former state representative 2014–2016
- Terry Martinez, primary candidate against Marc Snyder for House District 18
- Bill Murray, incumbent
- Athena Roe
- Val Snider, former city council at-large member 2011–2015
- Dennis Spiker
- Tom Strand, incumbent
- Randy Tuck
- Wayne Williams, former Colorado secretary of state 2015–2019

=== Results ===
| Candidate | Votes | % |
| Gordon Klingenschmitt | 28,352 | 11.09% |
| Bill Murray | 31,578 | 12.35% |
| Val Snider | 14,771 | 5.78% |
| Wayne Williams | 47,581 | 18.61% |
| Tony Gioia | 20,506 | 8.05% |
| Terry Martinez | 27,410 | 10.72% |
| Regina English | 19,816 | 7.75% |
| Tom Strand | 31,082 | 12.16% |
| Randy Tuck | 6,913 | 2.70% |
| Athena Roe | 17,727 | 6.93% |
| Dennis Spiker | 9,863 | 3.86% |

=== Withdrew from race ===
- John Pitchford, running for mayor

== Issues on ballot ==
The following issues were on the April election ballot.

- Issue 1 - Collective Bargaining for all Uniformed Fire Department Employees

Issue 1 was struck down.

=== Results ===
| Decision | Votes | % |
| Yes | 31,547 | 31.10% |
| No | 65,295 | 67.42% |

== Colorado Springs School District 11 Board of Education ==
Unaffiliated incumbent school board members Nora Brown and Elaine Naleski were term-limited and could not run for re-election. Unaffiliated incumbent school board members Theresa Null and Mary Coleman were eligible to run for re-election. Mary Coleman ran for re-election; Theresa Null did not.

=== Ballot list ===
School board candidates were pulled on 9/3/2019 and appeared on the El Paso County ballot on November 5, 2019.

- Mary Coleman, incumbent
- Darleen Daniels, D11 community member
- Jason Jorgenson, D11 community member
- Parth Melpakam, former chair of D11 Accountability Committee
- Vincent Puzick, D11 community member
- Conner Sargent, former D11 student
- Joseph Shelton, alumnus of Colorado Springs School District 11
- Chris Wallis

=== Results ===
Results shown per the El Paso County Clerk and Recorder office.

Mary Coleman, Darleen Daniels, Parth Melpakam and Jason Jorgeonson were elected to the School Board of District 11.

| Candidate | Votes | % |
| Mary Coleman | 24,977 | 19.32 |
| Darleen Daniels | 21,045 | 16.28 |
| Joseph Shelton | 10,237 | 7.92 |
| Conner Sargent | 9,373 | 7.25 |
| Jason Jorgenson | 16,727 | 12.94 |
| Parth Melpakam | 17,814 | 13.78 |
| Vincent Puzick | 12,944 | 10.01 |
| Chris Wallis | 16,169 | 12.51 |
