= Tim Gill =

American tech entrepreneur (born 1953)

- Born: October 18, 1953 (age 73); Hobart, Indiana, U.S.
- Education: University of Colorado, Boulder (BS)
- Occupations: Founder of the Gill Foundation and Quark, Inc.
- Known for: Philanthropy; LGBTQ Rights Activism; Computer Software Programming
- Political party: Democratic
- Spouse: Scott Miller

Tim Gill (born October 18, 1953) is an American computer software programmer, entrepreneur, philanthropist, and LGBTQ rights activist. He was among the first openly gay people to be on the Forbes 400 list of America's richest people.

He is the founder and co-chair of the Gill Foundation, a private Denver-based philanthropic organization supporting efforts to secure nationwide civil rights for LGBTQ Americans. As of 2019, he was the single largest individual donor to the LGBTQ rights movement in U.S. history, having personally committed more than $500 million since the early 1990s.

Gill is also the founder of the pioneering page layout software company Quark, Inc. Gill sold his fifty percent stake in the company in 1999 for a reported $500 million. Following the sale of his stake in Quark, Inc., Gill set aside sixty percent of his assets – more than $300 million – to fight for LGBTQ rights.

He is the co-founder and Chief Technology Officer of Josh.ai.

== Early life and education ==
Tim Gill was born in Hobart, Indiana, and moved to Colorado with his family when he was in third grade. He attended Wheat Ridge High School in Jefferson County, Colorado, eventually studying computer science and applied mathematics at the University of Colorado at Boulder.

== Philanthropy and political action ==
Gill is the founder of the Gill Foundation, Gill Action Fund, and OutGiving.

Gill first became involved in LGBTQ activism as a freshman at the University of Colorado at Boulder. He volunteered for the campus gay-liberation group and later supported local HIV/AIDS awareness. In 1992, he continued his involvement in LGBTQ political action in response to the passage of Colorado Amendment 2, which prevented non-discrimination ordinances in the state from protecting people based on sexual orientation and which the United States Supreme Court struck down as unconstitutional in its 1996 ruling in Romer v. Evans.

He is credited as a strategist and philanthropist who has made contributions to many LGBTQ rights victories in the United States, from the 2003 Goodridge v. Dept. of Public Health decision making Massachusetts the first U.S. state to allow same-sex marriage, to the U.S. Supreme Court's 2015 Obergefell v. Hodges decision legalizing same-sex marriage throughout the country.

Gill, along with Pat Stryker, Jared Polis and Rutt Bridges—called by the press the "Gang of Four"—together donated funds in support of Democratic organizations in Colorado, which many believe helped to flip control of the state legislature to Democratic control in 2004.

In July 2017, Gill was the subject of a profile by journalist Andy Kroll for Rolling Stone magazine titled "The Quiet Crusader: How Tim Gill turned a $500 million fortune into the nation's most powerful force for LGBTQ rights."

=== Gill Foundation ===
Tim Gill founded the Gill Foundation in 1994, and co-chairs it with his husband Scott Miller. The national, Denver-based non-profit organization underwrites academic research, polling, litigation, data analytics, and field organizing related to the LGBTQ rights movement.

The foundation's initial focus was to build LGBTQ public acceptance through support of mainstream projects in Colorado. The foundation established the Gay & Lesbian Fund for Colorado in 1996, which provides financial support to a variety of non-profit organizations in the state. In addition to LGBTQ equality, the foundation focuses on providing STEM education to every Colorado student, curbing predatory lending and increasing financial literacy, and supporting public media.

=== Gill Action Fund ===
In 2005, Tim Gill established the Gill Action Fund, which is separate from the charitable endeavors of the foundation. The political fund has helped to elect hundreds of pro-equality lawmakers across the country at the local, state, and federal levels. In 2006, its first election year, the fund helped defeat 50 of the 70 anti-LGBTQ candidates it targeted.

The fund also contributed to the successful 2016 election campaign of North Carolina Gov. Roy Cooper, who defeated the incumbent Republican Gov. Pat McCrory. Gill prioritized unseating McCrory after he championed and passed the anti-LGBTQ HB2 "bathroom bill," which forced transgender people to use public restrooms corresponding with their sex at birth rather than their gender identity.

=== OutGiving ===
In 1996, Gill founded OutGiving, a private, invitation-only philanthropic conference, to bring major pro-LGBTQ philanthropists together. OutGiving holds a conference every two years to discuss philanthropic strategies.

=== Freedom for All Americans ===
Since the U.S. Supreme Court's legalization of same-sex marriage in 2015, Gill has shifted his focus to securing non-discrimination protections in the 28 states where it is still legal to discriminate against LGBTQ people in housing, employment and public accommodations.

Gill is credited with developing a bipartisan strategy for securing non-discrimination protections in traditionally Republican states. In 2015, Gill, Paul Singer and Daniel Loeb, helped fund Freedom for All Americans to advocate for non-discrimination protections on the basis of sexual orientation and gender identity in states and local communities across the country. Freedom for All Americans has successfully enlisted the support of businesses and corporations to work with Republican-held state legislatures to reject or overturn anti-LGBTQ legislation. The organization borrows the state-focused model of Freedom to Marry, the grassroots organizations that directed the fight for same-sex marriage equality from state to state leading up to the U.S. Supreme Court's 2015 Obergefell v. Hodges decision.

=== University of Colorado endowment ===
In 1998, Gill endowed the Tim Gill Professorship in Infectious Diseases at the University of Colorado's medical school to support HIV research and education.

=== Others ===
In 2016, Tim Gill directed funding from the foundation to support a comprehensive theme study by the National Park Service to identify historically significant places related to LGBTQ history for potential inclusion in the National Register of Historic Places or designation as a National Monument.

== Business ventures ==
=== Quark, Inc. ===
After jobs at Hewlett-Packard and a consulting services firm, Gill started the company Quark, Inc. in 1981 with a $2,000 loan from his parents. Quark produced page layout software for the graphics market. With the introduction of Fred Ebrahimi as CEO in 1986, and the launch of the company's flagship page layout software, QuarkXPress, in 1987, Gill became a multi-millionaire. Gill sold his fifty percent interest in Quark in 1999 for a reported $500 million, citing his growing involvement in philanthropic and activist endeavors.

=== Connexion.org ===
In 2003, Gill created Connexion.org, a social media platform for engaging the LGBTQ community in political activities. Connexion closed in September 2011.

=== JStar LLC ===
In March 2015, Gill co-founded the smart home technology start-up JStar LLC. He is the chairman and Chief Technology Officer of the company. JStar's flagship product is Josh.ai, a voice-controlled home automation system using JStar's own artificial intelligence technology platform. The company is headquartered in Denver with offices in Los Angeles. In July 2017, JStar announced an additional $8 million in private investment to create original hardware to compete with Google Home, Amazon Echo, and other devices with intelligent assistants inside. Josh.ai can be used through Amazon Alexa-enabled devices, Google Home, and iOS and Android apps.

== Personal life ==
Gill married his husband, Scott Miller, in Massachusetts in 2009. They live in Denver, Colorado with their dog.

In 2022, Gill's husband Scott Miller became the U.S. Ambassador to Switzerland and Liechtenstein.

Gill is an avid snowboarder.

== Awards and honors ==
In 1996, Gill received the University of Colorado Distinguished Service Award for his work supporting HIV/AIDS research.

Macworld awarded him the Lifetime Achievement Award in 2001.

Gill was awarded the NOGLSTP GLBT Engineer of the Year Award in 2007.

In September 2007, People for the American Way awarded Gill its Spirit of Liberty Award.

Gill received Liberty Hill Foundation's Upton Sinclair award in 2011.

Colorado Governor Jared Polis awarded Gill the Colorado 2019 Vanguard Legacy Governor's citizenship Medal.

In August 2020, he was honored with Family Equality's Murray/Reese Family Award.

In January 2025, he was awarded the Presidential Medal of Freedom by President Biden.

In May 2025, Tim Gill and his husband, Scott Miller, were honored by TIME Magazine as "Titans" on the TIME 100 Philanthropy 2025 list. In the accompanying article, Gill says, “We understand there will be setbacks but we think that over time we will make incremental progress toward a freer and more fair world.”
