= Larry Ochs =

Larry Ochs may refer to:

- Larry Ochs (politician)
- Larry Ochs (musician)
