= Wayne W. Williams =

American politician (born 1963)

Wayne Williams
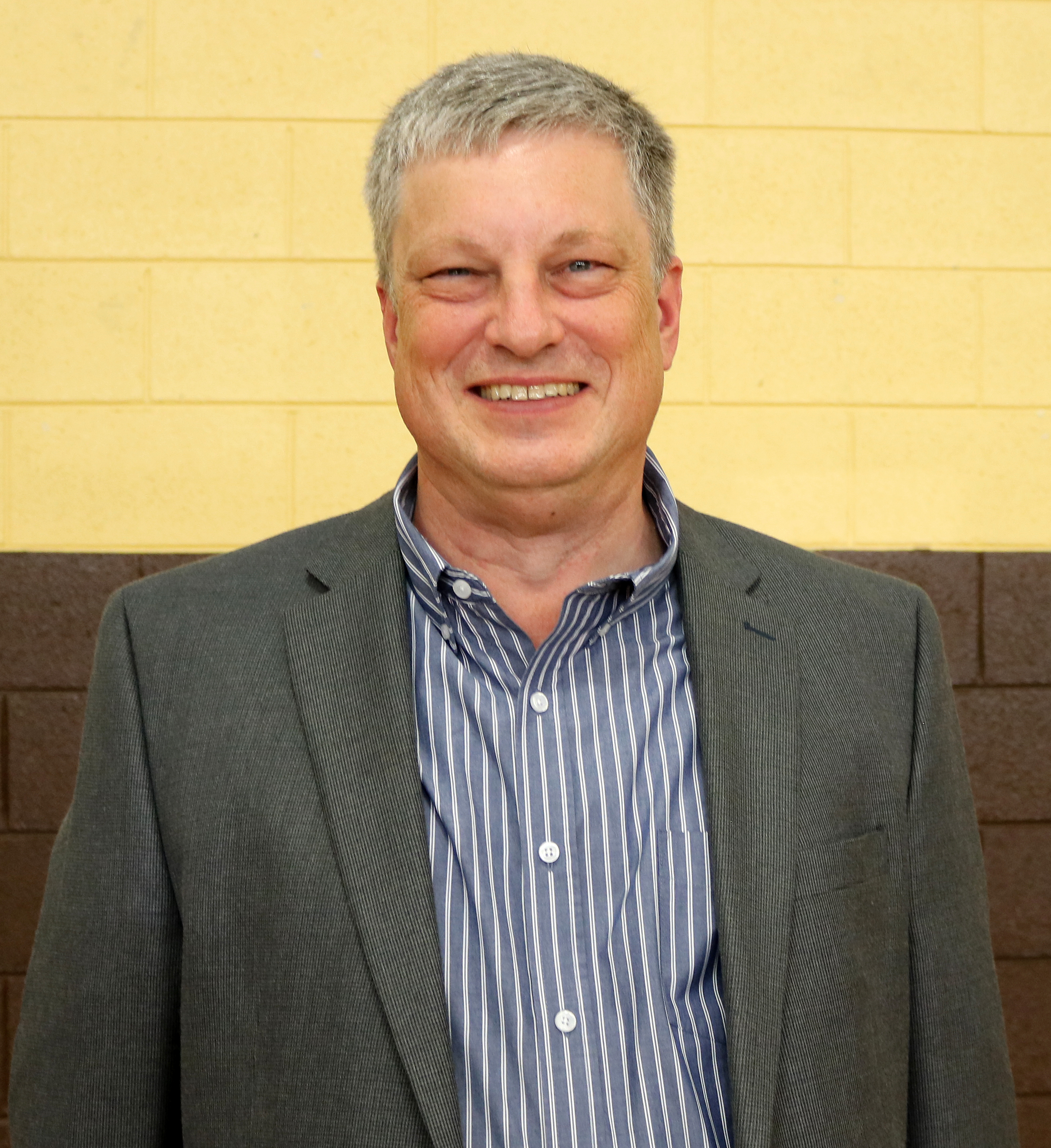

Member of the Colorado Springs City Council from the at-large district
- In office April 16, 2019 – April 18, 2023
- Preceded by: Merv Bennett
- Succeeded by: Lynette Crow Iverson

38th Secretary of State of Colorado
- In office January 13, 2015 – January 8, 2019
- Governor: John Hickenlooper
- Preceded by: Scott Gessler
- Succeeded by: Jena Griswold

Clerk and Recorder of El Paso County, Colorado
- In office 2011–2015
- Preceded by: Robert Balink
- Succeeded by: Chuck Broerman

Member of the El Paso County Board of County Commissioners from the 1st district
- In office 2003–2011
- Succeeded by: Darryl Glenn

Personal details
- Born: Wayne Warren Williams; January 19, 1963 (age 63) Palo Alto, California, U.S.
- Party: Republican
- Spouse: Holly Williams
- Children: 4
- Education: Brigham Young University (BA); University of Virginia (JD)

Wayne Warren Williams (born January 19, 1963) is an American attorney and politician. A member of the Republican Party, he served as an at-large member on the city council of Colorado Springs, Colorado from 2019 to 2023. Before serving on City Council, Williams was the Secretary of State of Colorado from 2015 to 2019.

== Early life ==
Williams grew up in the Shenandoah Valley of Virginia. His father was the facilities manager of the National Zoo's Smithsonian Conservation Biology Institute, where Williams was raised.

In high school, Williams organized for local Republican Party candidates. He also served as a delegate at the Virginia Republican Party convention. He attended Brigham Young University (BYU) on the Harry S. Truman Scholarship, and graduated in 1985 with a bachelor's degree in political science. He graduated from the University of Virginia School of Law in 1989.

== Career ==
=== Early career ===
Williams began practicing employment law and labor law in the Salt Lake City office of Holme Roberts & Owen. He was offered a job with Sherman & Howard in Colorado Springs, which he accepted in 1992.

Bob Isaac, the mayor of Colorado Springs, appointed Williams to the city's Housing Authority board. Williams served for eight years as an El Paso County Commissioner.He was succeeded by Darryl Glenn on the commission. In 2010, Williams was elected the El Paso County Clerk & Recorder.

=== Secretary of state ===
In 2014, Scott Gessler, the Secretary of State of Colorado, announced his candidacy for Governor of Colorado in the 2014 Colorado gubernatorial election. Williams ran unopposed for the Republican Party nomination for Secretary of State. He defeated Democratic Party nominee Joe Neguse in the general election, 47.5% to 44.9%.

On December 19, 2016, Micheal Baca, a Colorado presidential elector, was replaced by Williams with Celeste Landry after Baca failed to vote for Hillary Clinton as he was pledged; Landry voted for Clinton. Two Colorado electors filed suit against Williams in August 2017, but ultimately lost in the Supreme Court (Chiafolo v. Washington) in 2020.

=== Colorado secretary of state ===
In 2017, Williams complied with Donald Trump's request by sending publicly available voter data to the Presidential Advisory Commission on Election Integrity.

Colorado followed nearly every recommendation made by election experts in the wake of Russian interference in the 2016 election prior to the 2018 elections.

On November 6, 2018, Williams lost re-election to Democrat Jena Griswold.

=== Colorado Springs ===
In 2019, Williams announced his candidacy for the city council of Colorado Springs, Colorado, in the 2019 elections. He won an at-large seat on the council.

In 2023, Williams was a candidate for mayor of Colorado Springs. In the mayoral election held April 4, 2023, no candidate received more than 50% of the vote, and Williams was one of the top two vote-getters. A runoff election was held between Williams and the other top vote getter, Yemi Mobolade, on May 16. Mobolade defeated Williams.

On April 20, 2026, Yemi Mobolade selected Williams to fill the role of Interim Chief of Staff to the Mayor.

== Personal life ==
Williams and his wife, Holly, met at BYU. They have four children: Sean, Greg, Lindsey, and Wendy.

== Electoral history ==
=== Results ===
2023 Colorado Springs mayoral runoff election
Candidate	Votes	%
Yemi Mobolade	67,442	57.47
Wayne Williams	49,909	42.53
Total votes	117,351	100.00

2023 Colorado Springs mayoral election
Candidate	Votes	%
Yemi Mobolade	32,429	29.81
Wayne Williams	20,908	19.22
Sallie Clark	19,384	17.82
Darryl Glenn	9,470	8.70
Longinos Gonzalez Jr.	8,622	7.93
John Tig Tiegen	5,405	4.97
Andrew Dalby	4,825	4.44
Tom Strand	2,597	2.39
Lawrence Joseph Martinez	1,823	1.68
Christopher Mitchell	1,248	1.15
Kallan Reece Rodebaugh	1,129	1.04
Jim Miller	948	0.87
Total votes	108,788	100.00

2019 Colorado Springs at-large city council election

Candidate	Votes	%
Gordon Klingenschmitt	24,638	11%
Bill Murray	27,677	12%
Val Snider	12,997	6%
Wayne Williams	42,256	19%
Tony Gioia	18,155	8%
Terry Martinez	23,512	11%
Regina English	16,990	8%
Tom Strand	27,842	12%
Randy Tuck	5,981	3%
Athena Roe	15,143	7%
Dennis Spiker	8,410	4%

Colorado secretary of state election, 2018
Party	Candidate	Votes	%
Democrat	Jena Griswold	1,179,509	51.67
Republican	Wayne Williams	1,047,309	45.80
Constitution	Amanda Campbell	46,512	2.0
Approval Voting	Blake Huber	17,613	0.5

Colorado secretary of state election, 2014
Party	Candidate	Votes	%
Republican	Wayne Williams	932,588	47.34
Democrat	Joe Neguse	886,043	44.98
Constitution	Amanda Campbell	77,790	3.95
Libertarian	Dave Schambach	73,413	3.73

Political offices
Preceded by Scott Gessler	Secretary of State of Colorado; 2015–2019	Succeeded by Jena Griswold
