= Tamika Butler =

American businessman

- Education: Creighton University
- Occupations: Executive Director, Los Angeles Neighborhood Land Trust

Tamika Butler is the former Executive Director of the Los Angeles Neighborhood Land Trust.

== Early life and education ==
Butler was raised in Bellevue, Nebraska in the United States. In 2006, she received Bachelor's degrees in sociology and psychology from Creighton University. While at Creighton University, Butler was the president of the Gender and Sexual Alliance. In 2009, she received a Juris Doctor degree from Stanford Law School. After studying, she worked in employment law, LGBT and gender discrimination, and healthcare policy.

== Career ==
Butler was director of the California branch of Young Invincibles, a youth advocacy group; co-chair on the board of directors for the National Center for Lesbian Rights, a non-profit law firm for LGBT issues; and Director of Social Change Strategies at the Liberty Hill Foundation.

Butler was the Executive Director of the Los Angeles County Bicycle Coalition from 2014 to 2017. She originally became interested in cycling when she learned that about her diabetes risks. In 2015, she coordinated and participated in a bicycle ride to the Emmy Awards with Mad Men writer Tom Smuts to encourage cycling.

== Awards ==
In 2016, she won the Association of Pedestrian and Bicycle Professionals' award for Professional of the Year (Non-Profit Sector).

In 2017, Stanford Law School awarded Butler the Miles L. Rubin Public Interest Award for her work in "justice and social change in the lives of vulnerable populations."

In 2018, NLC Los Angeles recognized Tamika Butler with the organization's Hero award, following her leadership of the Los Angeles chapter.
