= 2011 Colorado Springs mayoral election =

- April 5, 2011 (first round); May 17, 2011 (runoff)
- Turnout: 58.75% (first round); 64.03% (runoff)
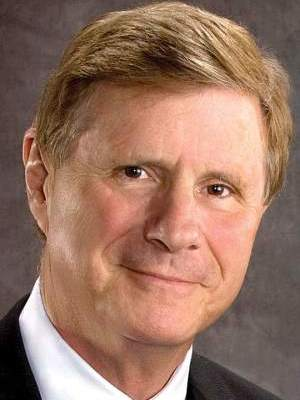

Candidate	Steve Bach	Richard Skorman
First round vote	29,767	31,889
First round percentage	33.46%	35.85%
Runoff vote	56,656	42,522
Runoff percentage	57.13%	42.87%
Candidate	Brian Bahr	Tom Gallagher
First round vote	13,576	4,703
First round percentage	15.26%	5.29%
Mayor before election
Lionel Rivera
Republican
Elected mayor
Steve Bach
Republican

The 2011 Colorado Springs mayoral election took place on May 17 and April 5, 2011, to elect the mayor of Colorado Springs, Colorado. The election was held concurrently with various other local elections. The election was officially nonpartisan.

This was the first mayor to elect a mayor of Colorado Springs to function under the strong mayor style of governance.

== Results ==
=== First round ===
First round results
Party	Candidate	Votes	%
Nonpartisan	Richard Skorman	31,889	35.85
Nonpartisan	Steve Bach	29,767	33.46
Nonpartisan	Brian Bahr	13,576	15.26
Nonpartisan	Tom Gallagher	4,703	5.29
Nonpartisan	Dave Munger	3,957	4.45
Nonpartisan	Budy Gilmore	3,581	4.03
Nonpartisan	Kenneth Paul Duncan	972	1.09
Nonpartisan	Mitch Christiansen	515	0.58
Total votes		88,960	

=== Runoff ===
Runoff results
Party	Candidate	Votes	%
Nonpartisan	Steve Bach	56,656	57.13
Nonpartisan	Richard Skorman	42,522	42.87
Total votes		99,178	

== See also ==
- List of mayors of Colorado Springs, Colorado
