= 2006 Colorado Attorney General election =

- November 7, 2006
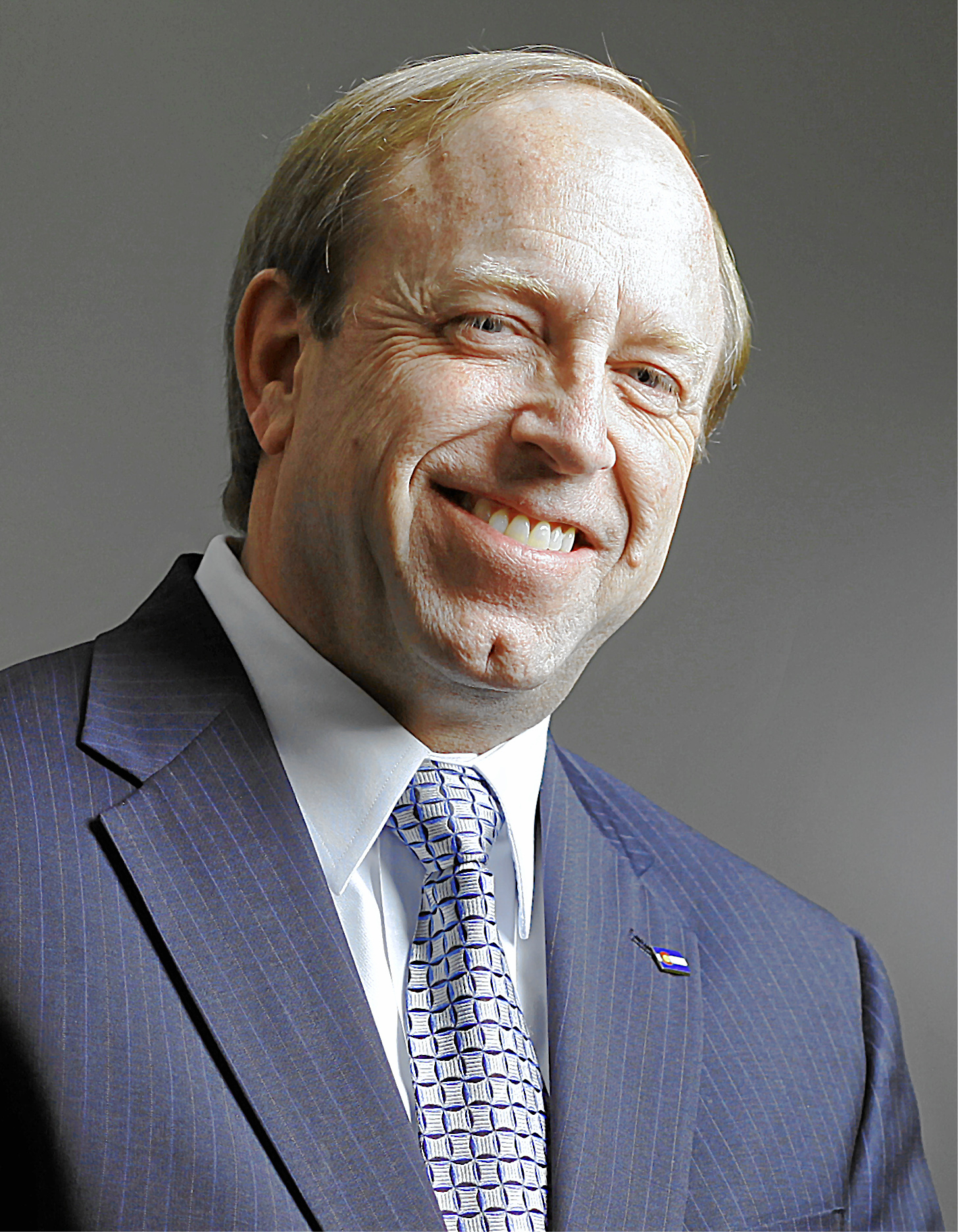

Nominee	John Suthers	Fern O'Brien
Party	Republican	Democratic
Popular vote	789,010	651,486
Percentage	52.50%	43.35%
- County results Suthers: 50–60% 60–70% 70–80% 80–90% O'Brien: 40–50% 50–60% 60–70%
Attorney General before election
John Suthers
Republican
Elected Attorney General
John Suthers
Republican

The 2006 Colorado Attorney General election was held on November 7, 2006, to elect the Colorado Attorney General. Republican incumbent John Suthers, who was appointed in 2005, won election to a full term, defeating Democratic challenger and lawyer Fern O'Brien by nine percentage points.

== Republican primary ==
=== Candidates ===
- John Suthers, incumbent Colorado Attorney General (2005–2015)

=== Results ===
Republican primary results
Party	Candidate	Votes	%
Republican	John Suthers	199,862	100.00%
Total votes		199,862	100.00%

== Democratic primary ==
=== Candidates ===
- Fern O'Brien, lawyer

=== Results ===
Democratic primary results
Party	Candidate	Votes	%
Democratic	Fern O'Brien	132,249	100.00%
Total votes		132,249	100.00%

== General election ==
=== Candidates ===
- John Suthers, incumbent Colorado Attorney General (2005–2015) (Republican)
- Fern O'Brien, lawyer (Democratic)

=== Results ===
2006 Colorado Attorney General election results
Party	Candidate	Votes	%	±%
Republican	John Suthers	789,010	52.50%	+14.84%
Democratic	Fern O'Brien	651,486	43.35%	−14.57%
Libertarian	Dwight K. Harding	62,426	4.15%	+2.27%
Total votes		1,502,922	100.00%	
Republican hold				
