= Scott Miller (activist) =

American LGBT activist and diplomat (born 1979)

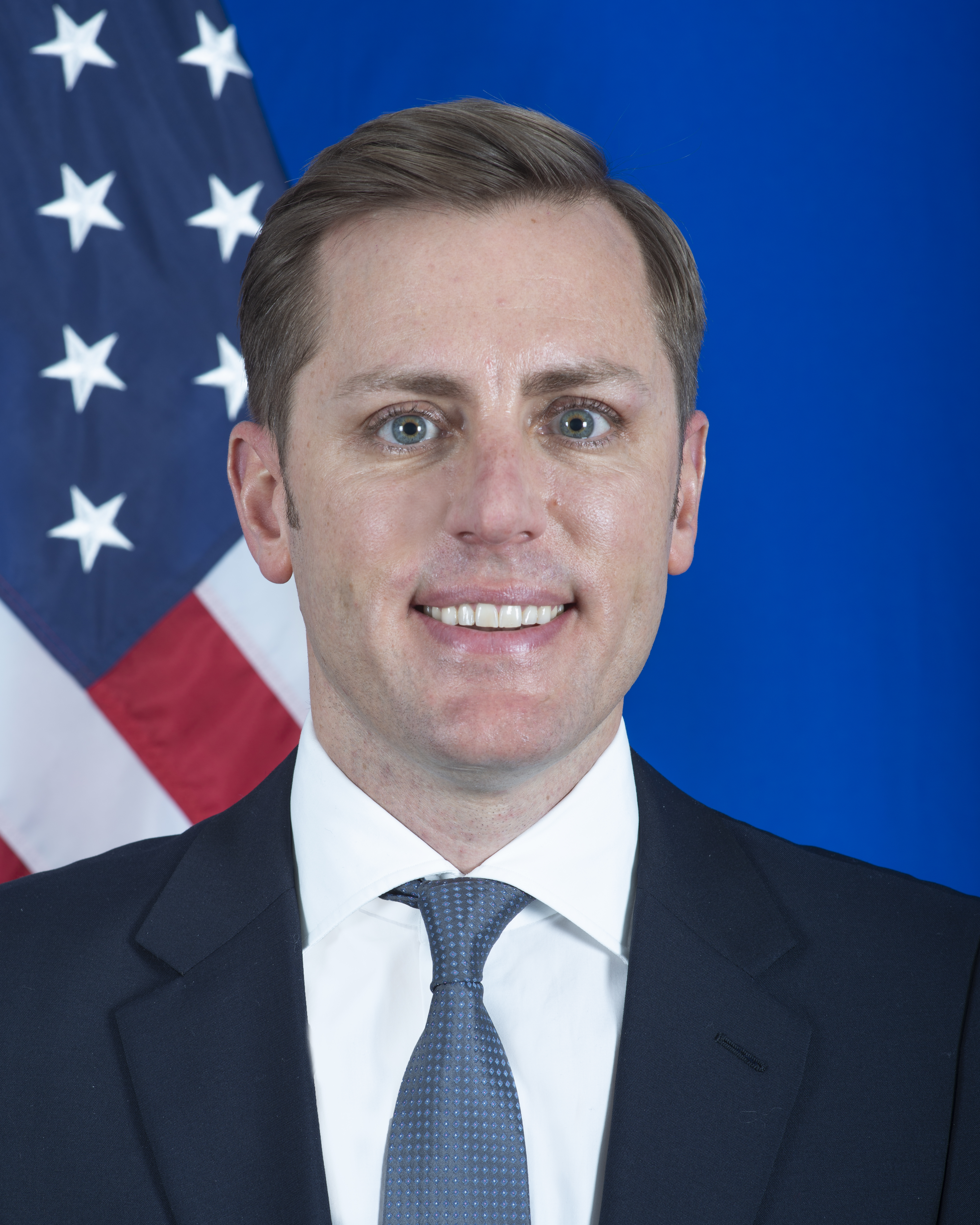
- Official portrait, 2022

United States Ambassador to Switzerland and Liechtenstein
- In office January 11, 2022 – January 20, 2025
- President: Joe Biden
- Preceded by: Ed McMullen
- Succeeded by: Callista Gingrich

Personal details
- Born: Scott Charles Miller; May 13, 1979 (age 47) Glenwood Springs, Colorado, U.S.
- Party: Democratic
- Spouse: Tim Gill (m. 2009)
- Education: University of Colorado Boulder (BSBA)
- Website: Department of State website

Scott C. Miller (born May 13, 1979) is an American LGBT rights activist, philanthropist and former banker. He served as the U.S. ambassador to Switzerland and Liechtenstein from 2022 to early 2025.

== Education ==
Miller was born on May 13, 1979, in Glenwood Springs, Colorado, to David and Beverly Miller. He was raised in Colorado. He graduated from the University of Colorado Boulder with a Bachelor of Science in Business Administration.

== Career ==
Miller worked as a management consultant at Accenture, as an event planner and as an account vice president at UBS Wealth Management in Denver.

=== Activism and philanthropy ===
Together with his husband, Tim Gill, Miller is active in LGBT rights activism, philanthropy, and Democratic Party politics.

Both are co-chairs of the Gill Foundation, one of the largest sponsors of LGBT equality causes in the United States. The foundation was instrumental in improving the reputation and visibility of LGBT people in Colorado and changing its image as a "hate state". During the COVID-19 pandemic, Miller led programs that provided more than 5 million meals to Coloradans in need.

Gill and Miller are political allies of Colorado Governor Jared Polis, and Gill has been described as "one of the architects of the Democratic takeover of Colorado politics". Gill and Miller have donated at least $3.6 million to Democratic candidates and campaigns since 2010, and Miller has been active in groups supporting the presidential candidacies of Hillary Clinton and Joe Biden.

In May 2025, TIME Magazine listed Miller and Gill as "Titans" on its TIME 100 Philanthropy 2025 list.

=== Ambassador to Switzerland ===
On August 6, 2021, President Joe Biden announced his intent to nominate Miller to be the U.S. Ambassador to Switzerland and Liechtenstein. The post is traditionally given to a political appointee, often a prominent donor. Notable LGBTQ+ organizations like Victory Fund praised Miller's nomination.

On August 10, 2021, his nomination was sent to the Senate. Hearings on his nomination were held before the Senate Foreign Relations Committee on November 2, 2021. In his prepared testimony, Miller highlighted priorities that would guide his work if confirmed. The committee reported him favorably on December 15, 2021.

On December 18, 2021, the United States Senate confirmed his nomination by voice vote. He was sworn in on December 21, 2021. He presented his letters of credence to the President of the Swiss Confederation, Ignazio Cassis, on January 11, 2022. On February 16, 2022, he presented his credentials to Alois, Hereditary Prince of Liechtenstein at Vaduz Castle. Miller is one of a small number of openly gay U.S. Ambassadors.

== Personal life ==
Miller married Tim Gill, the founder of Quark, in 2009, in a ceremony officiated by Governor Deval Patrick. The couple lives in Phipps Mansion in Denver. His official residence during his time as ambassador was Villa Blumenrain in Bern, Switzerland.

Diplomatic posts
Preceded by Ed McMullen	United States Ambassador to Switzerland; 2022–present	Incumbent
Preceded by Ed McMullen	United States Ambassador to Liechtenstein; 2022–present	Incumbent
