= Josh.ai =

American artificial intelligence company

- Industry: Home automation
- Founded: March 2015
- Founder: Tim Gill; Alex Capecelatro
- Headquarters: Denver, Colorado, United States
- Number of employees: 30
- Website: www.josh.ai

Josh.ai is an American artificial intelligence company known for developing the voice-controlled home automation system known as Josh. The company was founded in 2015 by Tim Gill and Alex Capecelatro. It is headquartered in Denver, Colorado.

== History ==
Prior to founding Josh.ai, Tim Gill was the founder of Quark, Inc. and the Gill Foundation. Co-founder Alex Capecelatro was previously a biomedical and rocket science researcher and co-founder of the social networking site At The Pool.

Gill and Capecelatro founded Josh.ai in March 2015 and shipped its first product in 2016. The company was originally known as JStar. During its first year, the company focused on developing AI voice assistant software available through the Apple Mac Mini. Its products were initially sold through CEDIA Integrators. In 2016, Josh.ai became the first CEDIA-channel brand to integrate its services with Google Home. Josh.ai also tested software for new voices and Sonos control for the Amazon Echo in 2016.

In 2017, Josh.ai released its first hardware product, the Josh Micro.

Josh.ai partnered with Atlona to integrate its voice control technology with Atlona's whole-home AV systems in 2018. At the 2018 CEDIA Expo, Josh.ai introduced the Josh 3.0 app's new learning and automation features for security, energy management, and control of entertainment devices.

In 2019 Josh.ai collaborated with Sonance to integrate Josh’s voice control with Sonance’s DSP amplifiers. Josh.ai also partnered with Trufig to release an in-wall mount for the Josh Micro product. In the same year, Josh.ai also provided voice control for Barco Residential, Sony, and AudioControl’s entertainment devices and systems.

In 2020, Josh.ai released the Josh Nano and Josh Core, which were home automation systems that used hard-wired connections and were composed of rack-based hardware components.

Josh.ai collaborated with Crestron Electronics in 2021 to release the first voice control solution for the Crestron Home smart home system. Josh.ai also partnered with IHG Hotels & Resorts to provide voice-controlled smart room features at the Kimpton Rowan hotel in Palm Springs, California.

In August 2021, Lutron Electronics unveiled the Josh.ai ready wallplate integrated voice control keypad, which integrates the Josh.ai Nano voice control module into a control keypad.

== See also ==
- Tim Gill
