= Yemi Mobolade =

American businessman and politician (born 1979)

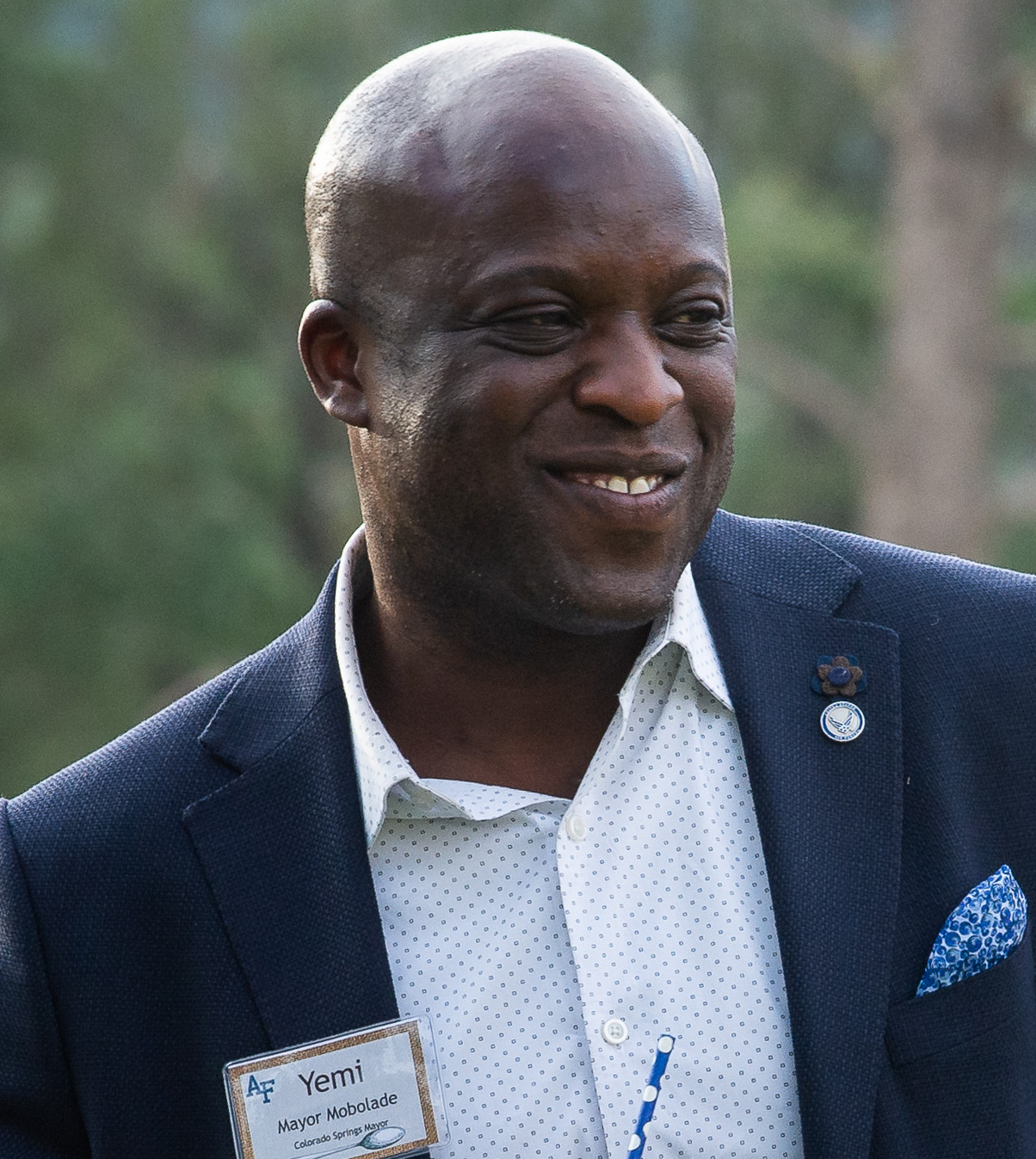
- Mobolade in 2023

42nd Mayor of Colorado Springs
- Incumbent
- Assumed office June 6, 2023
- Preceded by: John Suthers

Personal details
- Born: February 12, 1979 (age 47) Lagos, Nigeria
- Citizenship: Nigeria • United States
- Party: Independent
- Spouse: Abbey Mobolade
- Children: 3
- Education: Bethel University (BA); Indiana Wesleyan University (MA); Simpson University (MDiv)

Blessing Adeyemi Mobolade (born February 12, 1979) is an American businessman and politician. He is the 42nd mayor of Colorado Springs, Colorado, being sworn in on June 6, 2023.

== Early life and career ==
Yemi Mobolade was born and raised in Lagos, Nigeria. Mobolade's father worked in finance for ExxonMobil while his mother was a high school teacher. He has an older brother and two younger sisters. His parents converted to Christianity as young adults, and pursued education that would lead them to their current careers. Religion is a big factor in Mobolade and his family's lives. His name, Adeyemi, means "the crown fits me." His parents adopted a co-vocational approach to their lifestyle to indicate that both religion and professional development are important.

In August 1997, Mobolade alone immigrated to the United States. He attended Bethel University in Indiana, a private Christian school. In 2001, he graduated from the school, and pursued higher education, earning a master's degree in Management and Leadership from Indiana Wesleyan University. At Bethel, he received a Bachelors of Science in Computer Information Systems, and Bachelors of Arts in Business Administration. Finally, he received a Masters of Divinity at A.W Tozer Theological Seminary.

=== Personal life ===
Mobolade became a United States citizen in 2017. He met his wife, Abbey, in Indiana; they have three children. She now works as a full-time nurse educator. While in Lagos, Mobolade states that he did not have a ton of childhood memories, potentially indicating a sign of childhood trauma. He grew up in Yoruba culture, raised by a village. It was more community centered than individualistic. He described himself as "inquisitive" at a younger age, questioning things around him. His father working at ExxonMobil meant he was always gone. Mobolade developed both a combative relationship and a relationship of little communication with his father as a result of his father's physical absence. Despite that, he still holds family in high regard.

When Mobolade was almost 30, he underwent a faith and health crisis along with other health issues. He later discovered that he had 3 autoimmune diseases, with specifics not given. He chose to move out west to be outdoors and by mountains. He moved to Colorado in 2010.

Mobolade's transition to mayor then occurred through his affiliation with the church in Colorado Springs. The Christian and Missionary Alliance denomination hired Mobolade to open a new church and work with it.

Mobolade co-founded two restaurants, The Wild Goose and Good Neighbors Meeting House. He also founded a church within the Christian and Missionary Alliance, and was a ministry leader at the First Presbyterian Church of Colorado Springs between 2015 and 2017. Mobolade was the vice president of business retention for Colorado Springs' Chamber of Commerce from 2017 to 2019 and small business development manager for Colorado Springs from 2019 to 2022. In this role, Mobolade was tasked with promoting business growth that attracts work and business to the city.

== Mayor of Colorado Springs ==
Mobolade announced his candidacy for mayor of Colorado Springs in the 2023 election as an independent politician in April 2022. In the nonpartisan blanket primary, held on April 4, Mobolade finished in first place in the 12 candidate field with 29 percent of the vote, advancing to a runoff election against Republican Wayne W. Williams, former secretary of state, who received 20 percent. Mobolade defeated Williams in the runoff election on May 16, 57 percent to 43 percent, become the first elected Black mayor and the first non-Republican mayor of the city (Leon Young, who served as interim mayor in 1997, was the first Black mayor although appointed by the City Council).

Candidate	Total votes	% of Vote
Yemi Mobolade	32,429	29.8%
Wayne W. Williams	20,908	19.2%
Sallie Clark	19,384	17.8%
Darryl Glenn	9,470	8.7%
Longinos Gonzales Jr.	8,622	7.9%
Jonathan Tiehen	5,405	5.0%
Andrew Dalby	4,825	4.4%
Tom Strand	2,597	2.4%
Lawrence Martinez	1,823	1.7%
Christopher Mitchell	1,248	1.1%
Kaplan Rodebaugh	1,129	1.0%
Jim Miller	948	0.9%

Mayoral Runoff

Candidate	Total Votes	% of Votes
Yemi Mobolade	71,491	57.51%
Wayne W. Williams	52,812	42.49%

== Political positions ==
=== Immigration ===
As an immigrant himself, Mobolade notes the complexity and difficulty of the legal processes concerning immigration. Mobolade mentioned immigration from the southwest border in a statement early 2024. He prioritizes current residents benefitting from taxpayer dollars over new immigrants. He labels immigration patterns at the southern border as a "crisis" and has made it clear that Colorado Springs is not a sanctuary city. He does support the work of community nonprofits thus far to provide temporary housing for immigrants that found their way to Colorado Springs, but emphasizes that their resources are limited. He remains in contact with nonprofit shelters and the Pikes Peak Regional Office of Emergency Management.

=== Public safety ===
He seeks to crack down on unsafe drivers by focusing on speeding and alcohol use. During his time in office, a speed radar program was launched and implemented in school zones, construction areas, residential areas, and areas around parks. Mobolade wants to close the gap in the shortage of police officers in Colorado Springs. He hopes to reach the "authorized strength" value of 818 officers.

=== Infrastructure ===
Upon the start of his term, Ballot Issue 2C was already in effect. Sales tax has been used to renovate many roads in Colorado Springs, including via concrete pouring and paving. Mobolade supports 2C and expressed gratitude for it passing again in November 2024. According to the Mobolade's office, in his first year in office, 101,181 potholes were filled and signage for five school zones was installed. With funding from the 2C initiative, the equivalent of 179 miles of lanes and 47.5 miles of sidewalk were paved in Colorado Springs. The city's 24th fire station also underwent construction at this time. With goals of expanding city borders, Mobolade drafted a plan titled AnnexCOS.

=== Housing ===
Mobolade has a multistep plan to harness the issue of unsheltered homelessness in Colorado Springs. He aims to balance the preservation of public spaces with ensuring the homeless population has a safe place to sleep. To achieve this, he aims to provide funding for housing projects and nonprofit organizations. Mobolade also supports Colorado Springs' WorkCOS Program, which offers employment opportunities for unhoused people.

As of 2024, the city is dealing with a housing shortage due to population growth. Mobolade sees it a priority to close the supply-demand gap. He said it is important to keep the city's essential workers, like teachers and nurses, in the city. He created the Housing & Community Vitality department. Additionally, 345 affordable housing units went into construction during his first year as mayor.

=== Economic vitality ===
One of Mobolade's goals upon entering office was bolstering economic vitality. He has attempted to uphold this goal in a few ways. He hired a Workforce Development Administrator and Small Business Development Administrator. He also proposed the Business Navigator program, with the goal of assisting entrepreneurs in utilizing governmental resources.

== Faith and community ==
Mobolade co-founded COSILoveYou and CityServe Day, a nonprofit and movement that brings together over 100 churches from different denominations to serve Colorado Springs.

Through COSILoveYou, Mobolade built a "City Gospel Movement" in Colorado Springs—a collaboration between local churches and community leaders to transform the city. In 2023, 3,831 volunteers from 72 churches came together for CityServe Day.

== See also ==
- List of mayors of the 50 largest cities in the United States
- List of mayors of Colorado Springs, Colorado
- List of first African-American mayors

== Notes ==
Political offices
Preceded by John Suthers	Mayor of Colorado Springs; 2023–present	Incumbent
