= 1995 Colorado Springs mayoral election =

Colorado Springs mayoral election, 1995
- April 4, 1995
- Turnout: 15.69%
Candidate	Robert M. Isaac	Carl Heinze	Mark Grisko
Popular vote	18,690	2,809	2,167
Percentage	78.97%	11.87%	9.16%
Mayor before election
Robert M. Isaac
Republican
Elected mayor
Robert M. Isaac
Republican

The 1995 Colorado Springs mayoral election took place on April 4, 1995, to elect the mayor of Colorado Springs, Colorado. The election was held concurrently with various other local elections. The election was officially nonpartisan. It saw the reelection of incumbent mayor Robert M. Issac to a fifth term.

== Results ==
Results
Party	Candidate	Votes	%
Nonpartisan	Robert M. Isaac (incumbent)	18,690	78.97
Nonpartisan	Carl Heinze	2,809	11.87
Nonpartisan	Mark Grisko	2,167	9.16
Total votes		23,666	

== See also ==
- List of mayors of Colorado Springs, Colorado
