= Gill Action Fund =

- Founder: Tim Gill
- Type: 501(c)(4) nonprofit

The Gill Action Fund is an American 501(c)(4) issue advocacy organization founded in 2005 by philanthropist and entrepreneur Tim Gill to provide resources to individuals and organizations on both sides of the aisle working to advance equality for LGBT people through the legislative, political, and electoral process.

== Overview ==
Gill Action's Political OutGiving program works to engage a network of lesbian, gay, bisexual, transgender (LGBT), and allied political donors to advance full equality for LGBT people.

Gill Action is independent from the Gill Foundation. As a 501(c)(4) organization, Gill Action can support political and other organizations that actively lobby for the passage of legislation that protects LGBT people and their families.

== History ==
Prior to founding Gill Action, Tim Gill's 2004 political contributions helped Democrats take control of the Colorado General Assembly and elect Ken Salazar to the U.S. Senate.

During the 2006 midterm elections, the national network of donors Gill Action works with contributed more than $2.8 million to 68 political campaigns in 11 states with the aim of protecting pro-LGBT politicians or unseating elected officials they saw as anti-gay; 56 of Gill Action's targeted campaigns won.

In 2010, Tim Gill provided seed funding for a bipartisan independent expenditure campaign to unseat New York state senators who voted against marriage equality. The campaign, called Fight Back New York, successfully ousted Sen. Hiram Monserrate (D-Queens), Sen. William Stachowski (D-Buffalo), and Sen. Frank Padavan (R-Queens), replacing them with senators who support marriage equality.

Since its inception, Gill Action has played a role in passing and protecting nondiscrimination legislation in Iowa, Hawaii, Massachusetts, and municipalities in Michigan. Gill Action also played a role in passing and protecting relationship recognition (civil unions, marriage, etc.) legislation in Colorado, Connecticut, Hawaii, Illinois, Iowa, Maine, New Hampshire, New York, Rhode Island, Vermont, and Wisconsin.
