= Gay & Lesbian Fund for Colorado =

Organization funding LGBT nonprofits

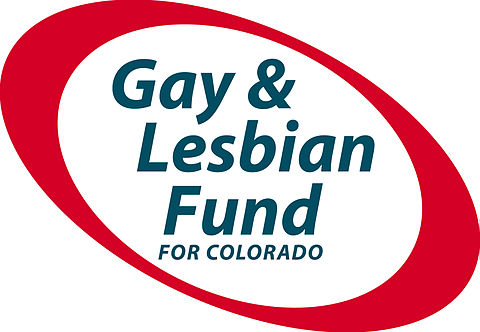
Gay & Lesbian Fund for Colorado logo

The Gay & Lesbian Fund for Colorado, a program of the Gill Foundation, provides financial support to nonprofit organizations in Colorado. Current grant making through the Gay & Lesbian Fund includes STEM education, promoting fair lending practices, access to safe capital, and financial literacy, support for Colorado public broadcasting stations, and statewide LGBT service and advocacy organizations. Based in Denver with the Gill Foundation, the Gay & Lesbian Fund for Colorado has awarded more than $52 million in grants since its inception.

== History ==
The Gill Foundation launched the Gay & Lesbian Fund for Colorado program in 1996. In 2009, the Gay & Lesbian Fund for Colorado won the Outstanding Foundation Award from the Colorado Nonprofit Association.

In 2011, the Gill Foundation closed its Colorado Springs office housing the Gay & Lesbian Fund for Colorado and moved all services to its Denver office during a period of strategic re-evaluation. In July 2012, the Gill Foundation gifted its Colorado Springs building to Rocky Mountain PBS to create the Tim Gill Center for Public Media.

== Today ==
Today, the Gay & Lesbian Fund for Colorado encompasses all Colorado programs and grants of the Gill Foundation, as well as a new program area in science, technology, engineering and math (STEM) education.

== Leadership ==
- Brad Clark, President & CEO, Gill Foundation
- Denise Whinnen, Director of Colorado Programs

== Awards ==
- 2009: National Philanthropy Day in Colorado, Outstanding Foundation
- 2009: Colorado College, Community Diversity Award (Mary Lou Makepeace)
- 2008: Colorado Women's Hall of Fame Inductee (Mary Lou Makepeace)
- 2007: Latin American Research and Service Agency: Bernie Valdez Corporate Award
- 2007: NEWSED Community Development Corporation and Santa Fe Drive Redevelopment Corporation: Celebrate Culture Civil Rights Award
- 2007: Greater Colorado Springs Chamber of Commerce: ATHENA Award (Mary Lou Makepeace)
- 2006: Denver Business Journal: Outstanding Woman in Business, "Nonprofits and Public Entities" sector (Mary Lou Makepeace)
- 2006: Colorado Springs Hispanic Chamber of Commerce: Non-Profit Organization of the Year

== See also ==
- LGBT rights in the United States
- List of LGBT rights organizations
