= 2003 Colorado Springs mayoral election =

Colorado Springs mayoral election, 2003
- April 1, 2003
Candidate	Lionel Rivera	Ted Eastburn
Popular vote	27,687	20,538
Percentage	34.33%	25.46%
Candidate	Sallie Clark	Jim Null
Popular vote	19,268	8375
Percentage	23.89%	10.38%
Mayor before election
Mary Lou Makepeace
Republican
Elected mayor
Lionel Rivera
Republican

An election was held on April 1, 2003, to elect the mayor of Colorado Springs, Colorado. The election was held concurrently with various other local elections. The election was officially nonpartisan.

== Results ==
Results
Party	Candidate	Votes	%
Nonpartisan	Lionel Rivera	27,687	34.33
Nonpartisan	Ted Eastburn	20,538	25.46
Nonpartisan	Sallie Clark	19,268	23.89
Nonpartisan	Jim Null	8,375	10.38
Nonpartisan	Tony Carpenter	2,163	2.68
Nonpartisan	MarieAnn Carter	1,669	2.07
Nonpartisan	Ken Kretzschmar	960	1.19
Total votes		80,660	

== See also ==
- List of mayors of Colorado Springs, Colorado
