= 1999 Colorado Springs mayoral election =

Colorado Springs mayoral election, 1999
- April 6, 1999
- Turnout: 30.29%
Candidate	Mary Lou Makepeace	Will Perkins	Sallie Clark
Popular vote	29,689	20,539	16,953
Percentage	44.19%	30.57%	25.23%
Mayor before election
Mary Lou Makepeace
Republican
Elected mayor
Mary Lou Makepeace
Republican

The 1999 Colorado Springs mayoral election took place on April 6, 1999, to elect the mayor of Colorado Springs, Colorado. The election was held concurrently with various other local elections. The election was officially nonpartisan.

== Results ==
Results
Party	Candidate	Votes	%
Nonpartisan	Mary Lou Makepeace (incumbent)	29,689	44.19
Nonpartisan	Will Perkins	20,539	30.57
Nonpartisan	Sallie Clark	16,953	25.23
Total votes		67,181	

== See also ==
- List of mayors of Colorado Springs, Colorado
