= Ed McMullen =

American political strategist and diplomat (born 1964)

Edward T. McMullen Jr.
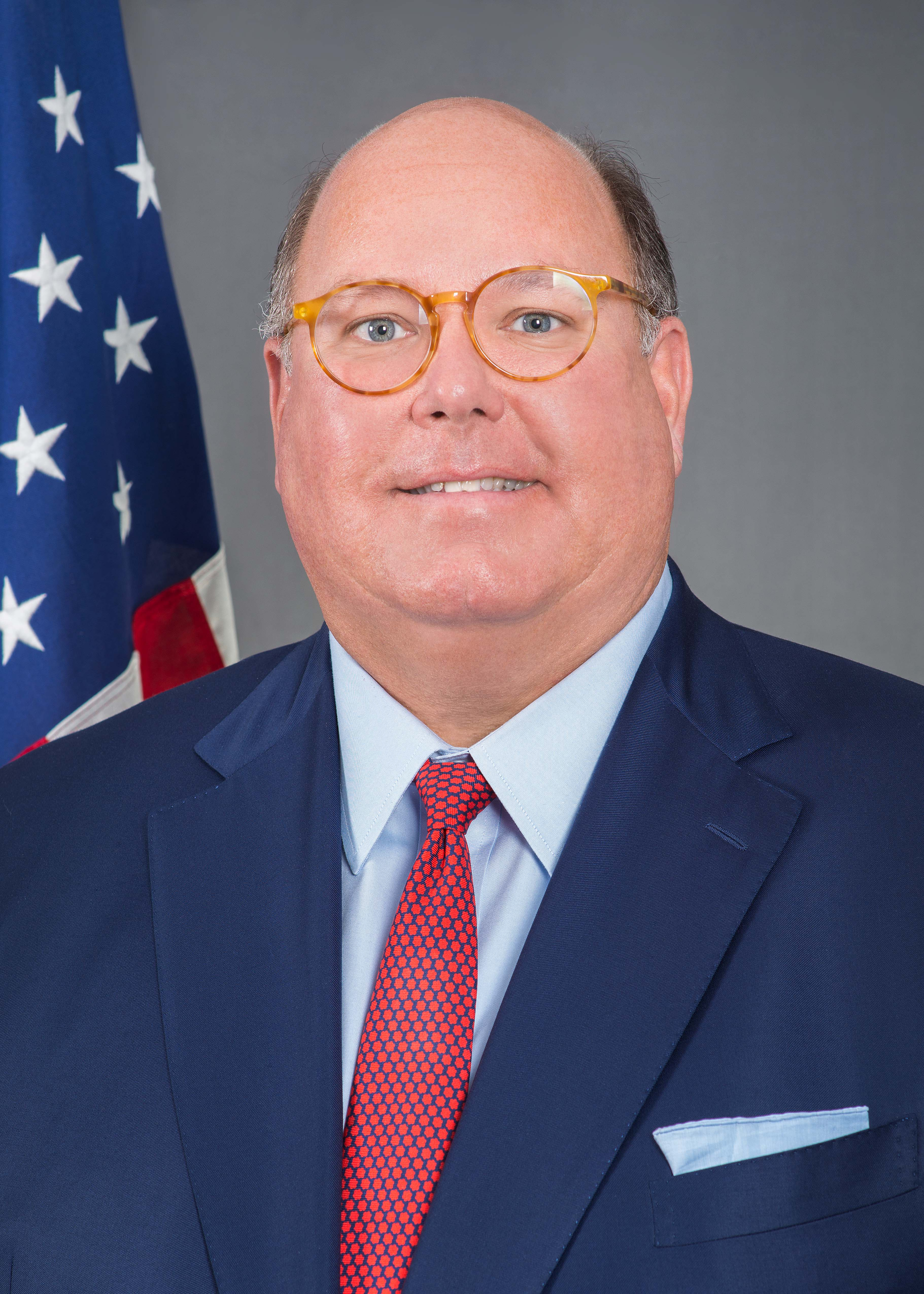

United States Ambassador to Switzerland and Liechtenstein
- In office November 21, 2017 – January 17, 2021
- President: Donald Trump
- Preceded by: Suzan G. LeVine
- Succeeded by: Scott Miller

Personal details
- Born: Edward Thomas McMullen Jr. May 1, 1964 (age 62) New York City, New York, U.S.
- Spouse: Margaret Ann Wade (m. 1989)
- Children: 2
- Education: Earl L. Vandermeulen High School
- Alma mater: Hampden–Sydney College

Edward Thomas McMullen Jr. (born May 1, 1964) is an American political strategist and diplomat, who served as the United States Ambassador to Switzerland from 2017 to 2021.

== Early life and education ==
McMullen was born May 1, 1964 in New York City, a son of Edward Thomas McMullen Sr. and Christine McMullen (née Cochran; later Valliere). He has two sisters; Michelle McMullen and Melissa McMullen and was primarily raised in Port Jefferson, New York on Long Island.

He attended Port Jefferson High School graduating in 1983, before studying Political Science at Hampden-Sydney College, a private college, located in Hampden Sydney, Virginia. He graduated in 1986 with a Bachelor of Arts in political science.

== Career ==
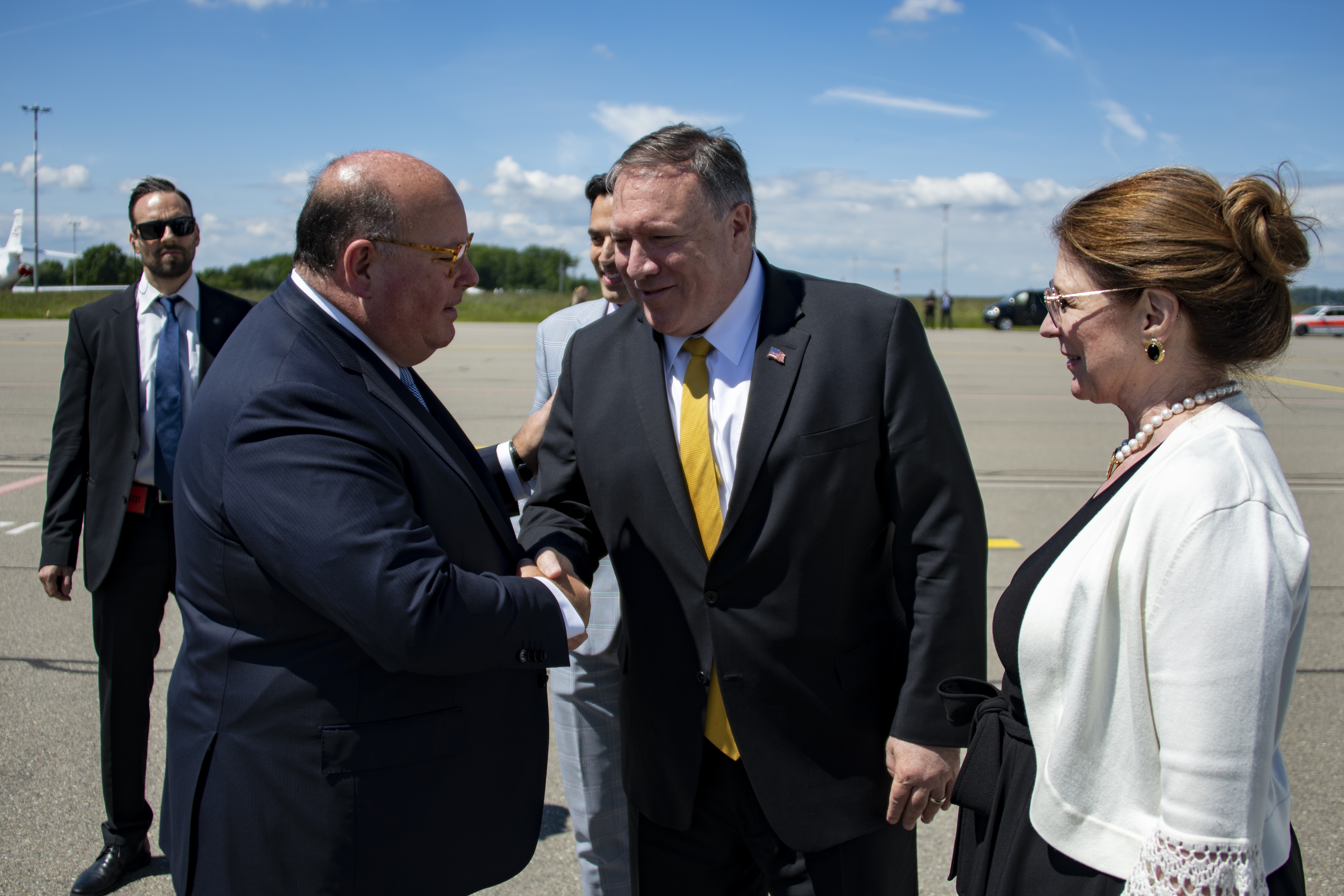
McMullen greets Secretary of State Michael R. Pompeo upon Pompeo's arrival to Zurich, Switzerland on May 31, 2019.

Prior to his appointment as Ambassador, he was the president of McMullen Public Affairs, an advertising and corporate public affairs company. In the 2002 election, he was a candidate in the Republican primary for South Carolina Secretary of State, losing to Mark Hammond who subsequently won the general election.

McMullen was involved with Trump's successful 2016 presidential campaign, acting as chairman of the candidate's South Carolina Republican primary efforts, helping to plan the 2016 Republican National Convention, and serving as a member of Trump's transition team and as vice chair of the Trump inaugural committee.

McMullen left office on January 17, 2021.

== Personal life ==
On April 1, 1989, McMullen married Margaret Ann Wade, a daughter of Julian "Hootie" L. Wade Jr. and Martha Ann Wade (née Echols), originally of Greenville, South Carolina. Her father was employed by J.P. Stevens & Co, a textile mill. They have two children;

- Edward T. McMullen III (born 1993)
- Katherine W. McMullen (born 1997)

Since his resignation from his Ambassador post in Switzerland, he moved back to Sullivan's Island, South Carolina.

Diplomatic posts
Preceded by Suzan G. LeVine	United States Ambassador to Switzerland and Liechtenstein; 2017–2021	Succeeded by Scott Miller
