= 2007 Colorado Springs mayoral election =

Regional election in Colorado

Colorado Springs mayoral election, 2007
- April 3, 2007
- Turnout: 38.79%
Candidate	Lionel Rivera	Tony Carptenter
Popular vote	33,970	11,037
Percentage	55.38%	17.99%
Candidate	Mike Coletta	Tony L. Tyler
Popular vote	8,432	3,909
Percentage	13.75%	6.37%
Mayor before election
Lionel Rivera
Republican
Elected mayor
Lionel Rivera
Republican

The 2007 Colorado Springs mayoral election took place on April 3, 2007, to elect the mayor of Colorado Springs, Colorado. The election was held concurrently with various other local elections. The election was officially nonpartisan.

== Results ==
Results
Party	Candidate	Votes	%
Nonpartisan	Lionel Rivera (incumbent)	33,970	55.38
Nonpartisan	Tony Carpenter	11,037	17.99
Nonpartisan	Mike Coletta	8,432	13.75
Nonpartisan	Tony L. Tyler	3,909	6.37
Total votes		57,348	

== See also ==
- List of mayors of Colorado Springs, Colorado
