= Lionel Rivera =

American politician

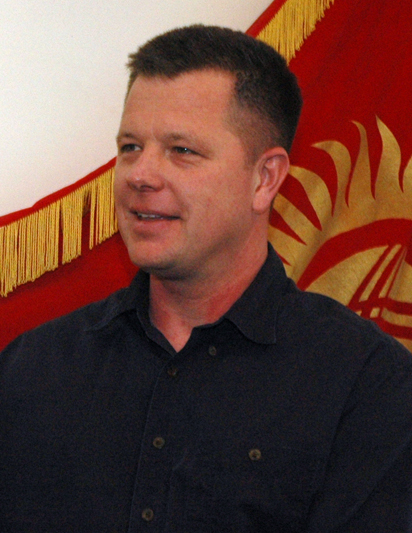

39th Mayor of Colorado Springs
- In office April 2003 – May 17, 2011
- Preceded by: Mary Lou Makepeace
- Succeeded by: Steve Bach

Personal details
- Born: Lionel Rivera Honolulu, Hawaii, U.S.
- Party: Republican
- Education: Texas Tech University (BS); Jacksonville State University (MBA)

Military service
- Branch/service: United States Army
- Rank: Captain

Lionel Rivera (born 1956) is an American politician who served as the mayor of Colorado Springs, Colorado, from 2003 to 2011. Elected in April 2003 and re-elected in 2007 on a mail ballot only election, he was the first Hispanic mayor in the city's history.

== Early life and education ==
Born in Honolulu, Hawaii, Rivera earned a bachelor's degree in microbiology from Texas Tech University and a Master of Business Administration from Jacksonville State University.

== Career ==
Rivera came to Colorado Springs in 1984 as an Army captain stationed at Fort Carson. He has served on several community boards and organizations, including as a founding member and past president of the Colorado Springs Hispanic Chamber of Commerce, a member of the Greater Colorado Springs Chamber of Commerce Board of Directors, and a member of the United Way Board of Trustees and its executive committee. He also served as co-chair of the Springs Community Action Plan.

Rivera was first elected to an at-large seat on the Colorado Springs City Council in April 1997 and re-elected in April 1999. In April 2001, his fellow City Council members elected him to serve a two-year term as vice mayor.

Rivera ran for the United States House of Representatives in Colorado's 5th congressional district but lost to Doug Lamborn in the Republican primary on August 8, 2006.

He was succeeded as mayor of Colorado Springs by Steve Bach on May 17, 2011. He did not seek re-election due to term limits.

== See also ==
- List of mayors of Colorado Springs, Colorado

Political offices
Preceded by Mary Lou Makepeace	Mayors of Colorado Springs; 2003 – 2011	Succeeded by Steve Bach
