= Larry Ochs (politician) =

American politician

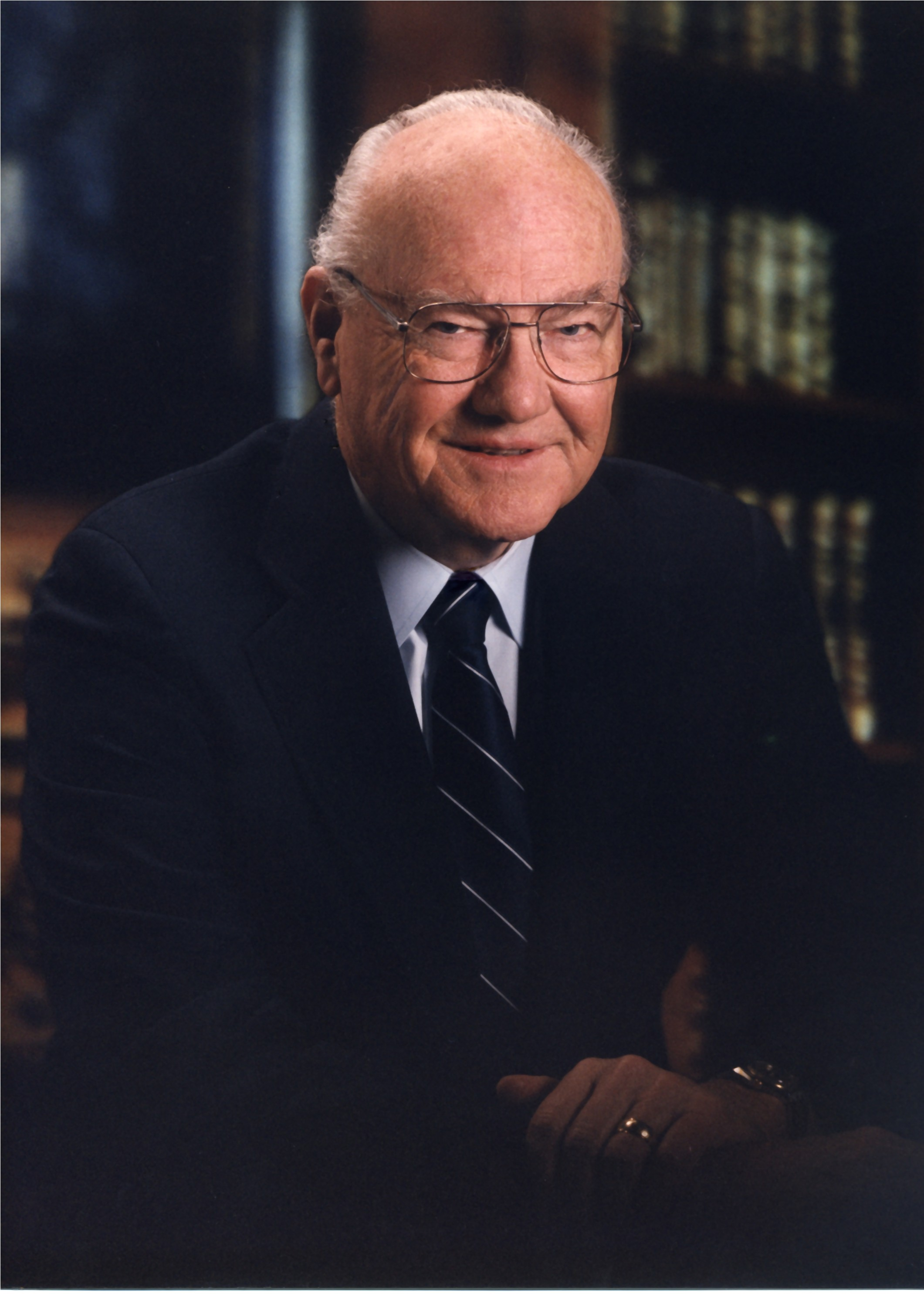

36th Mayor of Colorado Springs
- In office 1975–1979
- Preceded by: Andrew Marshall
- Succeeded by: Robert M. Isaac

Personal details
- Born: Lawrence Ochs; March 9, 1924 Russell, Kansas
- Died: April 23, 2003 (aged 79) Colorado Springs, Colorado
- Children: 2
- Education: University of Kansas

Military service
- Branch/service: United States Army
- Battles/wars: World War II

Lawrence "Larry" Ochs (March 9, 1924 – April 23, 2003) was an American politician who served as the 36th Mayor of Colorado Springs, Colorado.

== Early life and education ==
Ochs was born on March 9, 1924, in Russell, Kansas, the second of five children born to David and Matilda Emma Ochs (née Strecker). Ochs grew up in Russell where his father was a Chevrolet salesman. He received his education in Russell public schools where he excelled academically as well as in music, oratory, debate, basketball and student government. His family belonged to the Trinity Methodist Church. Ochs was also an Eagle Scout.

In the fall of 1942, he enrolled at the University of Kansas and became a member of Kappa Sigma fraternity, which later inducted him into its Hall of Fame. Ochs was a classmate of Bob Dole since the first grade and continued their relationship into college. In 1946, Ochs was drafted into the United States Army, on an officer's commission through OCS and overseas service until he was relieved from active duty in 1946. Ochs graduated from college in 1948.

== Career ==
In Colorado Springs, Ochs joined with brothers Harlan, Kenneth and Donald Ochs in a business partnership and opened the PDQ Car Wash in Colorado Springs, followed by launching Acorn Petroleum in 1959.

In 1967, Ochs was elected to the Colorado Springs City Council. In 1970, Ochs was elected Vice Mayor under Mayor T. Eugene McCleary.

In December 1970, Vice Mayor Ochs traveled to Paris with a League of Wives delegation and attempted to meet with North Vietnam representatives. They delivered 125,000 letters of support for the POWS to the North Vietnamese Embassy with the assistance of Hussein of Jordan and the Jordanian Embassy. Throughout the war, Ochs supported the POW-MIA cause.

In 1975, Ochs was elected Mayor by the Colorado Springs City Council, the last mayor to be elected by City Council rather than popular vote. As mayor, Ochs worked aggressively to expand business and other opportunities for Colorado Springs. He played an instrumental role in courting the United States Olympic Committee (USOC), and facilitated the arrangements that brought USOC to Colorado Springs, where the USOC moved into the campus that formerly was the home of Ent Air Force Base in downtown Colorado Springs. Ochs enthusiastically supported the “sister city” relationship with Fujiyoshida, Yamanashi, Japan (which began in 1962), and facilitated goodwill visits between the officials of both cities. He led the city in the airport expansion, building of a new propane storage facility to ease the natural gas shortage, further procurement of water rights and development of water storage, transmission and treatment facilities crucial to the expansion and growth of the city's population and businesses.

=== Later career ===
From 1979 to 2003, Ochs and his wife lived a quiet life in Colorado Springs. Out of politics, Ochs continued to manage Acorn Petroleum with his brothers, participated in the Pikes Peak Range Riders, and was an active member of the First United Methodist Church in Colorado Springs.

== Personal life ==
Ochs married Martha Lou Norton on September 4, 1946. The couple had two children. Martha died in 1977, and Ochs remarried in 1978 to Jean Mitchell, a widow from Dallas.

In 2001, Ochs was diagnosed with pulmonary fibrosis. He died on April 23, 2003, at the age of 79.

== See also ==
- List of mayors of Colorado Springs, Colorado

Political offices
Preceded by Andrew Marsall	Mayors of Colorado Springs; 1967 – 1975	Succeeded by Robert M. Isaac
