= Steve Bach (politician) =

American politician

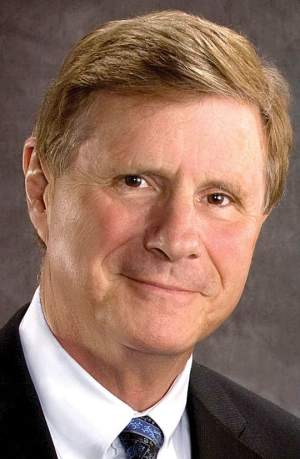

40th Mayor of Colorado Springs
- In office June 7, 2011 – July 2, 2015
- Preceded by: Lionel Rivera
- Succeeded by: John Suthers

Personal details
- Born: Goodland, Kansas, U.S.
- Party: Republican
- Education: University of Colorado Colorado Springs (BA)

Military service
- Branch/service: United States Army

Stephen G. "Steve" Bach is an American politician who served as the mayor of Colorado Springs, Colorado. Elected in a runoff in May 2011, he was the city's first mayor under the new "strong mayor" form of government. In 2014, Bach announced he would not seek a second term as mayor.

== Early life and education ==
Bach was born in Kansas and spent summers with family in Colorado, where he later returned to serve in the United States Army and graduated from the University of Colorado Colorado Springs.

== Career ==
After graduation, Bach moved to Cincinnati, Ohio, where he conducted business for a few years before returning to Colorado Springs. He stated that moving away from Colorado Springs was "The hardest day of my life. I know what it’s like to leave." He succeeded in selling real estate in the community, and founded his own brokerage firm.

=== Mayor of Colorado Springs ===
Bach was one of at least 11 mayoral candidates who ran in the April 2011 election to determine the candidates for runoff. He campaigned in the non-partisan election on a platform of "shaking up City Hall" and bringing jobs to the city. Bach ran numerous television spots in both the primary round of voting and the runoff. The runoff election, held May 17, 2011, was between Bach and former City Councilman Richard Skorman, a downtown businessman and a moderate. When the final results were calculated the next day, Bach had received 56,466 votes to Skorman's 42,315. The turnout was 64%, a high number for a local election in an off-year.

Bach was sworn in on June 7, 2011, at the city's historic Pioneers Museum downtown.

Political offices
Preceded by Lionel Rivera	Mayors of Colorado Springs; 2011 – 2015	Succeeded by John Suthers

== See also ==
- List of mayors of the largest 50 US cities
- List of mayors of Colorado Springs, Colorado
