= Leon Young (mayor) =

American politician

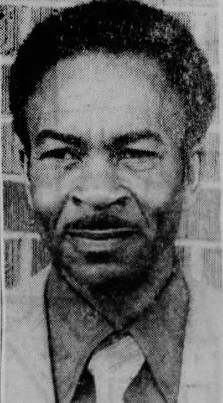

Mayor of Colorado Springs, Colorado
- In office 1997–1997
- Preceded by: Bob Isaac
- Succeeded by: Mary Lou Makepeace

Vice Mayor of Colorado Springs, Colorado
- In office 1981–1997

City Council of Colorado Springs, Colorado
- In office 1973–2001

Personal details
- Born: 1924 West Monroe, Louisiana
- Died: October 24, 2004 (aged 79–80) Colorado Springs, Colorado
- Party: Democratic
- Spouse: Margaret Lyon
- Children: 1

Military service
- Branch/service: United States Navy
- Battles/wars: World War II

Leon Young (1924 – October 24, 2004) was an American politician from Colorado Springs, Colorado. He served on the city council of Colorado Springs and was the city's first African-American mayor.

== Biography ==
Young was born in 1924 in West Monroe, Louisiana. He was raised by his grandparents after his father died when he was 5 and his mother when he was 10. Having to work, he did not complete the 10th grade. At the age of 18, he moved to Colorado Springs where his aunt lived. He enrolled at Colorado Springs High School but dropped out to work at a shoe repair store and later as a doorman and bartender at the El Paso Club. In 1943, he enlisted in the US Navy where he served during World War II. In 1945, he returned to Colorado Springs and founded Young Janitorial Services which went on to become one of the most successful Black-owned businesses in Colorado.

In 1973, Young was elected to the Colorado Springs City Council despite Colorado Springs being 86.6% non-Hispanic white in 1970. In 1981, he was unanimously appointed as Vice Mayor where he served until 1997. In 1997, he was elevated to interim Mayor after the early retirement and resignation of mayor Bob Isaac becoming the first African-American mayor of the city. He continued to serve on the City Council until his death in 2004.

== Personal life ==
In 1945, he married Margaret; they had a daughter, Denise Young Smith, in 1955.

== See also ==
- List of mayors of Colorado Springs, Colorado
- List of first African-American mayors
