= Gill Foundation =

American LGBT rights foundation

- Formation: 1994
- Founder: Tim Gill
- Tax ID no.: 84-1264186
- Headquarters: Denver, Colorado
- Location: United States
- Website: https://gillfoundation.org

The Gill Foundation is an American philanthropic foundation based in Denver, Colorado. It is one of the funders of efforts to secure full equality for lesbian, gay, bisexual, and transgender (LGBTQ) people in the United States. The foundation's mission is "to secure equal opportunities for all Americans, regardless of sexual orientation or gender identity and expression."

== History ==
The Gill Foundation was founded by Tim Gill in 1994, two years after the passage of Amendment 2, a Colorado ballot initiative denying lesbian, gay, and bisexual people equal protection under the law. As of 2017, the foundation had granted more than $335 million to various nonprofits.

In 2004, the Association of Fundraising Professionals (AFP), the largest association of charitable fundraisers in the world, honored the Gill Foundation with its Outstanding Foundation award.

On April 1, 2025, Kate Kendell was announced as the new CEO of the foundation, with a start date of May 7.

== Grant-making activities ==
The Gill Foundation supports nonprofit organizations in the United States working to bring about equality for LGBT people. Beyond its grant-making, the foundation also has been recognized for its OutGiving program, through which the foundation seeks to build a larger base of philanthropists giving strategically in support of LGBT causes. In recognition of the OutGiving program, Liberty Hill Foundation honored Tim Gill with its Upton Sinclair Award in 2011 "for his vision, passion and leadership in helping to create and continuing to inspire the modern day LGBTQ donor movement."

The Gill Foundation invests a significant portion of its funding in its home state of Colorado, supporting nonprofits working to improve the quality of life for all Colorado residents. In 2016, $1.7 million was invested in Colorado organizations. Its Gay & Lesbian Fund's $1 million challenge grant in 2005 to the Mile High chapter of American Red Cross was one of the largest non-corporate donations in the country for Hurricane Katrina disaster relief.

At its inception, the Gill Foundation office was based in Colorado Springs. In June 2012, to consolidate operations, the Gill Foundation closed down the office in Colorado Springs while continuing its presence in Denver. The foundation donated the Colorado Springs building to Rocky Mountain PBS to create the Tim Gill Center for Public Media. The foundation reevaluated the future direction of the Gay & Lesbian Fund, although it remains committed to its Colorado programs.

== See also ==
- List of LGBT organizations
- Gay & Lesbian Fund for Colorado
