= Liberty Hill Foundation =

US non-profit organization

The Liberty Hill Foundation is a non-profit organization founded by Sarah Pillsbury, heir to the Minnesota Pillsbury baking fortune, along with Anne Mendel, Larry Janss and Win McCormack, in 1976. Its motto is "Change. Not Charity."

The name of the foundation derives from a famous incident on May 15, 1923 when writer Upton Sinclair spoke to approximately 3,000 striking longshoremen at Liberty Hill in San Pedro, Los Angeles, California. In a piece of street theater designed to highlight ongoing suppression of freedom of speech by the LAPD, Sinclair began his address by reading the Bill of Rights. Within moments, he was arrested.

== Activities ==
The foundation presents an annual award in the name of activist and writer Upton Sinclair to "a person of unwavering idealism and vision, whose work illustrates an abiding commitment to social justice and equality." The Upton Sinclair Award is given to "a person like Sinclair, whose lifelong crusade for equality and justice inspires us even today." In addition, Liberty Hill presents its Founders Award to individuals who embody the spirit of change, not charity, with the belief that real progress happens in communities.

The foundation also funds local Los Angeles organizations dedicated to environmental justice, such as East Yard Communities for Environmental Justice. It has also provided funding for out-of-state organizations such as the Brennan Center for Justice at New York University School of Law.
