= Mary Lou Makepeace =

Mayor of Colorado Springs, Colorado, 1997-2003 (born 1940)

38th Mayor of Colorado Springs
- In office April 4, 1997 – April 17, 2003
- Preceded by: Leon Young
- Succeeded by: Lionel Rivera

Personal details
- Born: Mary Louise Pfahl; April 30, 1940 (age 86) Dickinson, North Dakota, U.S.
- Party: Democratic (2017-current); Independent (2017-2023); Republican (before 2017)
- Education: University of North Dakota (BA); University of Colorado Colorado Springs (MPA)

Mary Lou Makepeace (born April 30, 1940) is an American politician who served as the mayor of Colorado Springs, Colorado from 1997 to 2003. She was the first woman to hold that position.

== Early life and education ==
Born Mary Louise Pfahl, she received a bachelor's degree in journalism and political science from the University of North Dakota and attended the Harvard University Program for State & Local Government. She earned a Masters of Public Administration from the University of Colorado Colorado Springs in 1979.

== Career ==
=== Early career ===
She taught at the American School in Antananarivo, Madagascar, and was appointed Assistant to the Defense Attaché at the American Embassy in Prague, Czechoslovakia, following the 1968 Soviet invasion. She later served as adult education officer at Ramstein Air Base in Germany.

Makepeace moved to Colorado Springs in 1973, where she worked as a caseworker, and later administrator, for the El Paso County Department of Social Services between 1974 and 1982, working on child abuse cases.

Her work in the nonprofit world began when she became the executive director of the Community Council of the Pikes Peak Region, which established programs like a homeless shelter and Project COPE, designed to assist the elderly and the poor with their utility bills.

She entered politics in 1985, when she was appointed to fill a council seat being vacated. She was the executive director of the adolescent child placement agency STAY from 1995 to 1997. As councilmember, Makepeace helped form the Colorado Springs Women's Network in response to the growing number of women who voiced concerns about discrimination.

=== Mayor of Colorado Springs ===
Colorado Springs’ first female mayor, Makepeace was elected in 1997 to fill the last two years of retiring Mayor Bob Isaac’s term, defeating Republican Cheryl Gillaspie, known for carrying a pistol in public, by 25%. She was re-elected in 1999, defeating Republican Will Perkins, who opposed the zero-tolerance discrimination policy passed by the city in 1997.

As mayor in a Council-Manager form of government, she led a 9-member city council, served as chairman of the board of Colorado Springs Utilities and provided oversight to the city owned Memorial Hospital. Makepeace was known for her open leadership, unifying a once-fractious Council and gained voter approval for significant improvements, notably America the Beautiful Park.

She appointed the city's first female municipal judges and initiated the successful Springs Community Action Program (SCIP) engaging hundreds of citizens in prioritizing capital improvements needs in the city, which resulted in citizen approval of the largest bond issue in the city's history up to then.

=== Post-mayoral career ===
Term limited in 2003, she joined the Gill Foundation and became the executive director of the Gay & Lesbian Fund for Colorado, distributing millions of dollars to nonprofits across the state.

Makepeace continued her affiliation with philanthropy and nonprofit organizations in the Pikes Peak area when she became executive director of the highly successful Indy Give! campaign raising over $1 million in the last two months of 2013.

She has served as executive director of Leadership Pikes Peak, as adjunct faculty at the Center for Creative Leadership, executive director of the Community Council of the Pikes Peak Region, and executive director of STAY, a child placement agency. Recently she was the executive director of Inside Out Youth Services, an organization for LGBTQ youth in the Colorado Springs community.

She currently is on the faculty of the political science department at UCCS.

Makepeace has served on a variety of state, local and national committees including the Board of Governors of Colorado State University, the Colorado Space Advisory Committee, the Policy Advisory Council of the America Power Association, and the Energy Committee of the U.S. Conference of Mayors. She is a founding board member of Artemis Women and the Women's Chamber of Southern Colorado.

She was inducted to the Colorado Women's Hall of Fame in 2008. Other recognitions include the Athena Award, Colorado College Community Diversity Award, Denver Business Journal’s Outstanding Woman in Business, Colorado Springs Chamber of Commerce Outstanding Community Service Award, the Mary Jean Larson Community Service Award, and numerous others.

== Awards ==
- 2009: Colorado College, Community Diversity Award
- 2008: Colorado Women’s Hall of Fame Inductee
- 2007: Greater Colorado Springs Chamber of Commerce: ATHENA Award
- 2006: Denver Business Journal: Outstanding Woman in Business, “Nonprofits and Public Entities” sector

Political offices
Preceded by Robert M. Isaac	Mayor of Colorado Springs; 1997 – 2003	Succeeded by Lionel Rivera

== Articles ==
- The Gazette: Mayor Mary Lou Makepeace was a Downtown Colorado Springs Champion, Dec. 18, 2013
- CausePlanet.org: Altering the Course of History: Collaborations Make Good, Sept. 5, 2008
- Colorado Springs Business Journal: Bringing an End to Discrimination: Good for Business, June 13, 2008.
- CausePlanet.org: Advancing equality: From the Lobby to the Legal Ease, Your Work Environment Says a Lot, October 15, 2007.
- CausePlanet.org: Collaborate and improvise for organizational change, July 17, 2007.
- CausePlanet.org: Looking at Diversity in a New Way, April 2, 2007.
- Denver Business Journal: Advancing Latino Education is Good for Business, January 5, 2007.
- Denver Business Journal: Arts and Cultural Events Can Help Drive Your Business Success, July 7, 2006.
- Denver Business Journal: Strategies and Business-Like Approaches Help with Fundraising, October 14, 2005.

== Electoral history ==
Colorado Springs Mayoral General election, 2015
Party	Candidate	Votes	%
Non-Partisan	John Suthers	40,900	46.37
Non-Partisan	Mary Lou Makepeace	20,783	23.56
Non-Partisan	Joel Miller	13,794	15.64
Non-Partisan	Amy Lathen	10,352	11.74
Non-Partisan	Lawrence Martinez	1,125	1.28
Non-Partisan	Tony Carpenter	1,048	1.19
Non-Partisan	Moses Humes (Write In)	5	0.01

Colorado Springs Mayoral Runoff election, 2015
Party	Candidate	Votes	%
Non-Partisan	John Suthers	65,991	67.58
Non-Partisan	Mary Lou Makepeace	31,666	32.43

== See also ==
- List of mayors of Colorado Springs, Colorado
