= Bob Isaac =

American politician (1928–2008)

Robert Isaac

37th Mayor of Colorado Springs
- In office 1979–1997
- Preceded by: Larry Ochs
- Succeeded by: Leon Young

48th President of the United States Conference of Mayors
- In office 1990–1991
- Preceded by: Kathy Whitmire
- Succeeded by: Raymond Flynn

Personal details
- Born: Robert Michael Isaac; January 27, 1928 Colorado Springs, Colorado, U.S.
- Died: May 2, 2008 (aged 80)
- Party: Republican
- Children: 5
- Education: United States Military Academy (BS); University of Southern California (JD)

Robert Michael Isaac (January 27, 1928 – May 2, 2008) was an American attorney and politician who served as the 37th mayor of Colorado Springs, Colorado. Elected in April 1979, he was the first popularly-elected mayor in the history of Colorado Springs, serving five four-year terms through 1997.

== Early life and education ==
Isaac was born and raised in Colorado Springs, Colorado. He graduated from Colorado Springs High School in 1945. He earned a Bachelor of Science in electrical engineering from the United States Military Academy in 1951 and a Juris Doctor from the University of Southern California's Gould School of Law in 1962.

== Career ==
After graduating from the United States Military Academy, Isaac worked as a math teacher in Germany.

Isaac was a partner in the law firm of Isaac, Johnson & Alpern. He served as assistant district attorney for the Fourth Judicial District of Colorado in 1965 and 1966, and as a judge for the Colorado Springs Municipal Court from 1966 to 1969. He was a city councilman for Colorado Springs from April 1975 to April 1979.

On September 29, 1983, President Ronald Reagan nominated Isaac to be a member of the board of trustees of the Harry S. Truman Scholarship Foundation for a term expiring December 10, 1987, succeeding Washington state legislator Dick King.

During his tenure, KVUU aired a daily drive-time segment called "Stump Mayor Bob", in which the DJs would call the mayor's office and ask him trivia questions.

In 1997, the Colorado Springs Municipal Court at 224 East Kiowa Street was renamed the Robert M. Isaac Municipal Court Building. The terminal at the Colorado Springs Municipal Airport is also named in his honor.

== Personal life ==
Of Syrian Christian descent, he was twice-married and had five children. Isaac died on May 2, 2008, from complications from pneumonia.

== See also ==
- List of mayors of Colorado Springs, Colorado

Political offices
Preceded by Larry Ochs	Mayor of Colorado Springs; 1979–1997	Succeeded by Mary Lou Makepeace
