= John Suthers =

American attorney and politician (born 1951)

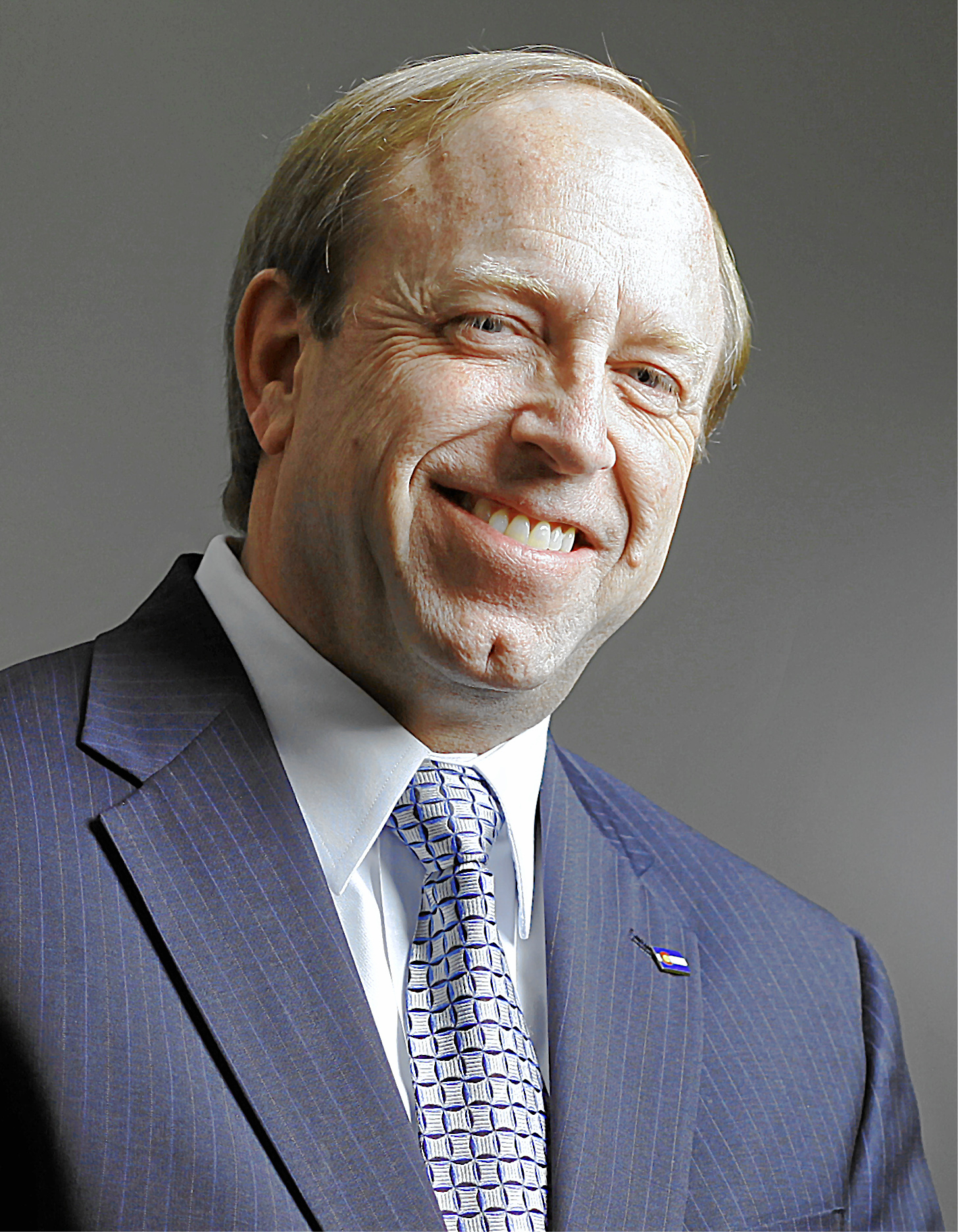

41st Mayor of Colorado Springs
- In office June 3, 2015 – June 6, 2023
- Preceded by: Steve Bach
- Succeeded by: Yemi Mobolade

37th Attorney General of Colorado
- In office January 4, 2005 – January 13, 2015
- Governor: Bill Owens; Bill Ritter; John Hickenlooper
- Preceded by: Ken Salazar
- Succeeded by: Cynthia Coffman

United States Attorney for the District of Colorado
- In office August 2001 – January 2005
- President: George W. Bush
- Preceded by: Tom Strickland
- Succeeded by: Troy Eid

District Attorney for the 4th Judicial District of Colorado
- In office January 1989 – January 1997
- Preceded by: Barney Iuppa
- Succeeded by: Jeanne Smith

Personal details
- Born: John William Suthers; October 18, 1951 (age 74) Denver, Colorado, U.S.
- Party: Republican
- Spouse: Janet Suthers
- Education: University of Notre Dame (BA); University of Colorado, Boulder (JD)

John William Suthers (born October 18, 1951) is an American attorney and politician who served as the mayor of Colorado Springs, Colorado, the Attorney General of Colorado, U.S. Attorney for Colorado, executive director of the Colorado Department of Corrections, and Fourth Judicial District Attorney. He is a member of the Republican Party.

== Early life and education ==
Suthers was born in Denver and adopted a month later by William and Marguerite Suthers of Colorado Springs. His father died when Suthers was 15, and his mother died when he was 23.

He attended St. Mary's High School in Colorado Springs, and the University of Notre Dame, from which he graduated magna cum laude with a degree in government in 1974. Suthers graduated from the University of Colorado School of Law in 1977. He attended college and law school on academic scholarships.

== Career ==
=== Early career ===
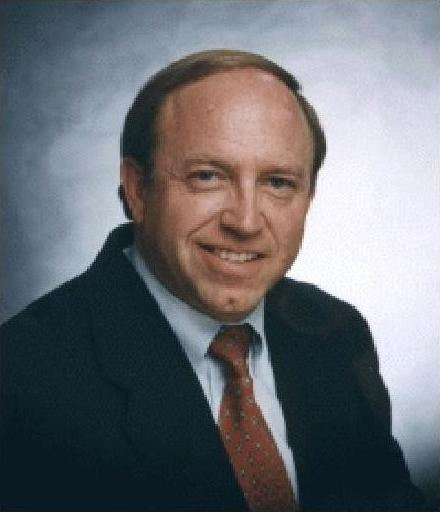
Suthers as U.S. Attorney

From 1977 to 1981, Suthers served as a deputy and chief deputy district attorney in Colorado Springs. From 1979 to 1981, he headed the Economic Crime Division of the district attorney's office and co-authored a book on consumer fraud and white-collar crime. During his time as a prosecutor at the local level, he tried cases ranging from drunken driving to first degree murder and from shoplifting to securities fraud.

In 1981, Suthers became a litigation partner in the Colorado Springs law firm of Sparks Dix, P.C. He remained with the firm until 1989, at which time he defeated an incumbent to become the elected district attorney of the Fourth Judicial District. He served as president of the Colorado District Attorneys Council in 1994-1995. At the conclusion of his second term, Suthers returned to Sparks Dix in 1997 as senior counsel in charge of the firm's litigation section. He then ran for Attorney General in 1998 and lost 47.5% to 50% to Colorado Department of Natural Resources Director Ken Salazar.

In January 1999, Suthers was appointed executive director of the Colorado Department of Corrections by Governor Bill Owens. In that capacity he managed a department of 6,000 employees and an annual budget of more than $500 million.

Suthers has served as an adjunct professor at the University of Denver School of Law and as a scholar in residence at the University of Colorado Colorado Springs. He also has held several bar association leadership positions, including president of the El Paso County Bar Association and senior vice president of the Colorado Bar Association. He served as Colorado Commissioner on the National Conference of Commissioners on Uniform State Laws from 1993 to 1997.

=== United States Attorney ===
In August 2001, Suthers was appointed by President George W. Bush as United States Attorney for the District of Colorado. He was unanimously confirmed by the United States Senate and assumed the position the week before the terrorist attacks of Sept. 11, 2001. During his tenure as U.S. Attorney for the District of Colorado, he led the state's anti-terrorism efforts and his office prosecuted several high-profile white collar cases, including cases against executives of Qwest.

=== Colorado Attorney General ===
Following the election of Ken Salazar to the United States Senate, John Suthers was nominated by Governor Owens and confirmed by the State Senate as the 37th Attorney General of Colorado in January 2005. Suthers served the remaining two years of Salazar's term before running for reelection in 2006. In November 2006, Suthers won election to the Attorney General's Office, defeating challenger Fern O'Brien by nine percent. During the same election cycle, the Republican candidate for Governor, Congressman Bob Beauprez, lost 56%–40%.

Despite being courted in 2008 and 2010 to run for the U.S. Senate, Suthers chose to run for re-election. Suthers defeated his Democratic opponent, Stan Garnett, in 2010 election by a 13-point margin – the largest margin of victory in a two-way race in Colorado that year. In both 2006 and 2010, Suthers received the endorsement of virtually every major newspaper in Colorado. including The Denver Post, which called him a "tireless public servant".

Suthers served on the executive committee of the National Association of Attorneys General (NAAG) from 2007 to 2013. He chaired the NAAG Criminal Law Committee from 2005 to 2007 and was a member of the U.S. Attorney General's Executive Working Group on Prosecution from 2005 to 2015. He served as the Chairman of the Conference of Western Attorneys General (CWAG) in 2009-2010.

In December 2008, Suthers personally argued before the U.S. Supreme Court in the case of Kansas v. Colorado. The issue was decided in favor of Colorado.

In June 2012, Suthers was awarded the Kelley-Wyman Award by the National Association of Attorneys General. It is the highest award given by the Association and is presented annually to the Attorney General who has done the most to advance the interests of the Association. Suthers had been a principal negotiator for the state attorneys general in the National Mortgage Settlement in which the nations five largest mortgage services agreed to pay $25 billion in compensation for loan servicing misconduct.

Suthers was the second longest-serving attorney general in Colorado history. Only Duke Dunbar, who served 22 years from 1951 to 1973, had a longer tenure as Colorado Attorney General.

=== Mayor of Colorado Springs ===
On May 19, 2015, Suthers was elected Mayor of Colorado Springs, defeating former Mayor Mary Lou Makepeace in a runoff election by a 68% to 32%. Colorado Springs is the 39th largest city in the United States, with a population of 500,000. The population of the metropolitan area is 770,000.

Suthers stated his priorities as restoring a collaborative relationship with City Council and other governmental entities in the Pikes Peak region, addressing the city's infrastructure issues, particularly roads and stormwater, and aggressively promoting new job creation.

In November 2015, his plan to increase sales taxes for five years in order to raise $250 million to repair roads in Colorado Springs was approved by the City Council 8 - 1 and by voters by a 65% to 35% margin. The tax was extended by the voters in November 2019, again with 65% of the vote.

In April 2016, Colorado Springs entered into an intergovernmental agreement with Pueblo County under which the city of Colorado Springs committed to spend at least $460 million over the next 20 years on its stormwater program. The agreement paved the way for a new water delivery project, The Southern Delivery System (SDS), to go online as scheduled. The system is expected to meet the water needs of Colorado Springs for the next 50 years. In November 2017, Colorado Springs voters approved by a 54% to 46% margin a stormwater fee to fund its stormwater program.

In April 2018, Colorado Springs approved an amended annexation agreement for Banning Lewis Ranch, paving the way for development of 24,000 acres that will accommodate the growth of the city for decades to come.

In December 2015, Suthers was awarded the Colorado Governor's Citizenship Medal, the highest award given to a citizen of Colorado, in recognition of his service as attorney general and for his work as Mayor, to put Colorado Springs on a "very positive trajectory".

In November 2016, Suthers was named Colorado Technology Advocate of the Year for his efforts in establishing a National Cybersecurity Center in Colorado Springs and advancing the city's efforts to become a cybersecurity hub for the nation.

In May 2017, Suthers was listed among others on a short list of candidates to replace James Comey as the FBI Director after a recommendation to the first Trump administration from Colorado Senator Cory Gardner. While Suthers expressed gratitude for being listed amongst leading law enforcement officials from around the US, he expressed disinterest in moving into any federal position as well as disinterest in any future runs for the office of Governor of Colorado. On April 2, 2019 Suthers was re-elected to a second term as mayor, capturing 74% of the vote in a four way race.

Under Suthers' leadership, Colorado Springs has become widely known as "Olympic City USA", for its identity as the home of 24 National Governing Bodies, as well as the United States Olympic and Paralympic Committee and the U.S. Olympic and Paralympic Training Center. In July 2020, the nation's only U.S. Olympic and Paralympic Museum opened in Colorado Springs.

In 2021, Colorado Springs secured the final approvals for the City for Champions initiative, a five-project effort that saw the City add a downtown stadium, a new indoor arena on the Colorado College campus, the Olympic Museum, the Hybl Sports Medicine and Performance Center on the campus of the University of Colorado Colorado Springs and a new Visitors Center at the United States Air Force Academy.

During Suthers' tenure as mayor, Colorado Springs' gross domestic product (GDP) has grown by a third from $30 billion to $40 billion annually. According to the Milken Institute, the city's economy was 98th among the nation's 200 largest cities when Suthers took office in 2015. In 2022, the city ranked among the nation's top 10 municipal economies. According to U.S. News & World Report, Colorado Springs was ranked the Most Desirable City in America from 2019 to 2022.

== Electoral history ==
Colorado Springs Mayoral General election, 2019
Candidate	Votes	%
John Suthers	61,830	74%
Juliette Parker	9,512	11%
John Pitchford	8,478	10%
Lawrence Martinez	4,160	5%

Colorado Springs Mayoral Runoff election, 2015
Party	Candidate	Votes	%
Non-Partisan	John Suthers	65,991	67.58
Non-Partisan	Mary Lou Makepeace	31,666	32.43

Colorado Springs Mayoral General election, 2015
Party	Candidate	Votes	%
Non-Partisan	John Suthers	40,900	46.37
Non-Partisan	Mary Lou Makepeace	20,783	23.56
Non-Partisan	Joel Miller	13,794	15.64
Non-Partisan	Amy Lathen	10,352	11.74
Non-Partisan	Lawrence Martinez	1,125	1.28
Non-Partisan	Tony Carpenter	1,048	1.19
Non-Partisan	Moses Humes (Write In)	5	0.01

Colorado Attorney General election, 2010
Party	Candidate	Votes	%
Republican	John Suthers	960,995	56.3
Democrat	Stan Garnett	744,601	43.7

Colorado Attorney General election, 2006
Party	Candidate	Votes	%
Republican	John Suthers	789,034	52.4
Democrat	Fern O'Brien	652,268	43.4
Libertarian	Dwight K. Harding	64,122	4.29

== Post political career ==
After being term limited as Mayor of Colorado Springs in 2023, Suthers became a shareholder in the law firm of Brownstein Hyatt Farber Schreck, LLP. His practice areas include litigation, government relations, state attorneys general and external investigations for private and public entities. Suthers also serves on the boards of the Daniels Fund, Alpine Bank, the U.S. Olympic and Paralympic Museum and the Colorado Freedom Counsel.

== Personal life ==
Suthers and his wife Janet have two adult daughters, Alison and Kate. Alison is a Deputy District Attorney in Denver, and Kate is a Commander in the United States Navy. Suthers has two grandchildren.

On July 1, 2019, Suthers' son-in-law Dr. Mark Karla died following a crash where the Uber in which he was riding was struck by a stolen car fleeing from Denver police. The Uber driver was also killed, and the driver of the stolen vehicle was convicted of two counts of vehicular homicide.

Suthers has authored six books, including No Higher Calling, No Greater Responsibility: A Prosecutor Makes His Case (Fulcrum Publishing, 2008) and Becoming a Good Ancestor (Morris Publishing, 2011). His autobiography, "All This I Saw and Part of It I Was" (Gracepoint Publishing, 2023) was published in June 2023.

== See also ==
- List of mayors of the 50 largest cities in the United States

Legal offices
Preceded by Tom Strickland	United States Attorney for the District of Colorado; 2001–2005	Succeeded by Troy Eid
Preceded by Ken Salazar	Attorney General of Colorado; 2005–2015	Succeeded by Cynthia Coffman
Political offices
Preceded by Steve Bach	Mayor of Colorado Springs; 2015–2023	Succeeded by Yemi Mobolade
