= Jillaire McMillan =

American politician

Member-elect of the Colorado House of Representatives from the 19th district
- Assuming office January 2027
- Succeeding: Dan Woog

Personal details
- Party: Democratic
- Education: Boston College (BA, MA)

Jillaire McMillan is an American politician. She is the Representative-elect for district 19 of the Colorado House of Representatives.

== Career ==
McMillan first ran for office in 2024, when a Democratic vacancy committee appointed her to the ballot to replace Representative Jennifer Parenti on the ballot. She lost to Republican challenger Dan Woog by 110 votes. McMillan later ran again in 2026, defeating Woog in the general election.

She is the co-founder of Blue Trail Engineering, a marine robotics company.

== Education ==
McMillan has both a Bachelor of Arts in history and a Master's degree in American history, both from Boston College.
