= Marsha Looper =

American politician (born c.1959)

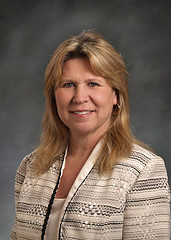

Member of the Colorado House of Representatives from the 19th district
- In office January 10, 2007 – January 9, 2013
- Preceded by: Richard Decker
- Succeeded by: Amy Stephens

Personal details
- Party: Republican
- Spouse: Lynn
- Education: Mesa State College
- Occupation: Appraiser; Rancher; Realtor

Marsha Looper (born c. 1959) is a former Colorado legislator. Elected to the Colorado House of Representatives as a Republican in 2006, Looper represented House District 19, which encompasses eastern El Paso County, Colorado from 2006 to 2012.

== Early career ==
Born to a family of Eastern European descent, Looper was raised on Colorado's Western Slope. She graduated from Fruita Monument High School in Mesa County in western Colorado and took coursework at Mesa State College. A systems engineer, Looper certified as an IBM Network Engineer and a Novell Systems Engineer, and worked for ROLM, IBM and the Widefield School District before starting a company of her own, Computing Solutions Group, in 1993.

Looper entered the real estate business in 2004 and has earned Associate Broker and Registered Appraiser credentials. Since 2004, she has been a partner in Big Sky Realty, in addition to operating Phoenix & Associates, a home remodeling company. She is now working at Keller Williams Partners, specializing in Military Relocations, Recreational and Country properties.

Looper and her husband, Lynn, have operated their family's ranch in near Calhan, Colorado for two decades, as well as Waterworks Sales, a water pipe distribution company. After Waterworks' was purchased by Hughes Supply, Inc., Looper remained with the company as a branch manager. She and Lynn have three children.

Within the community, Looper has been a member of the Pikes Peak Firearms Coalition, the National Rifle Association, the El Paso County Republican Women, the Falcon School District Accountability Committee, the Pikes Peak Range Riders, and the El Paso County Soil and Water Conservation Society, and volunteered with St. Michael's Church, the Special Olympics, and local 4-H and YMCA clubs.

=== Property-rights activism ===
Looper was a driving force behind opposition to a proposed toll road project along the Colorado Front Range — the Prairie Falcon Parkway Express, or "Super Slab" project — a 210-mile (340 km) highway and rail corridor stretching from Pueblo to Fort Collins. The project would have resulted in the condemnation or taking by eminent domain of privately held properties in seven Colorado counties; Looper's land fell within the corridor designated by the toll road's developers, and subsequently dropped in market value.

As the founder, in 2004, and chair of the Eastern Plains Citizens Coalition and executive director of Colorado Citizens for Property Rights, Looper led grassroots opposition to the toll road and supported several measures during the 2006 legislative session to tighten the rules regarding eminent domain under which toll roads could be constructed. Among the successful measures lobbied for by Looper and others were rules narrowing the proposed corridor for toll roads from twelve to three miles (19.3 to 4.8 km), and new reporting requirements that property owners be informed that their land lay within that corridor.

Looper also led an effort to place a statewide referendum on the 2006 general election ballot to prohibit governments from condemning private property for the purpose of economic development. The citizen initiative gathered over 30,000 signatures, but fell more than 30,000 signatures short of the total required for placement on the statewide ballot.

== Legislative career ==
=== 2006 election ===
In February 2006, upon the retirement of term-limited Rep. Richard Decker in House District 19, covering eastern El Paso County, Colorado, Looper announced her candidacy for the seat. After experience pushing for legislation Colorado General Assembly to restrict to use of eminent domain, she cited her frustration at the influence of lobbyists, and Looper identified her top legislative concerns as property rights, transportation, and illegal immigration. She also identified water issues and renewable energy as areas of interest. Facing military veteran and school board member Jim Brewer, Looper won the Republican primary with 62% of the vote.

In the general election, Looper faced former Fountain, Colorado mayor and Democrat Ken Barela. Barela criticized Looper's emphasis on property rights, calling her a "one issue candidate;" in response, Looper characterized Barela as "too liberal" for the district. Although she was endorsed by Republican Rep. David Schultheis, she was not endorsed by Republican and outgoing Rep. Richard Decker, who criticized her for possible involvement in an independent publication promoting her campaign, and for donating over $50,000 of personal money to her legislative race; Looper outraised Barela by roughly 10 to 1, and won the general election by a 2 to 1 margin.

=== 2007 legislative session ===
Bills Introduced in 2007 by Rep. Looper (for which Rep. Looper is the primary originating sponsor)
| BILL | TITLE | OUTCOME |
| HB07-1068 | Concerning [...] requirements on private toll companies for the purpose of alleviating unintended consequences of those provisions that may affect real property. | Passed House; Postponed indefinitely in Senate committee |
| HB07-1156 | Concerning the disclosure of water sources in connection with the sale of residential real property. | Signed by Gov. Ritter |

In the 2007 session of the Colorado General Assembly, Looper sat on the House Agriculture, Livestock and Natural Resources Committee and the House Local Government Committee.

Stemming from her work on toll road issues, including opposition to the "Super Slab" project as an activist, Looper sponsored legislation to impose new requirements, including planning in conjunction with the Colorado Department of Transportation, on new toll road development in Colorado. Other opponents of the "Super Slab" project criticized the bill for removing requirements that property owners be informed of planned development; the requirements had resulted in a decrease in property values for many in the proposed project's corridor. Looper contended that the purpose of the bill was to reduce the potential property value impact of speculative toll road projects. Although the bill passed the Colorado House of Representatives 61-3, the bill was postponed indefinitely in a Senate committee.

Looper also sponsored legislation to require disclosure of water sources for newly sold homes, a move designed to inform homeowners of possibly scarce groundwater resources. Unsuccessfully put forward in three previous years, the bill pass unanimously through committee and the full house before being signed by Gov. Ritter.

=== 2008 legislative session ===
In the 2008 session of the Colorado General Assembly, Looper sits on the House Agriculture, Livestock, and Natural Resources Committee, and the House State, Veterans, and Military Affairs Committee.

In response to concerns about agricultural labor shortages and the difficulty of hiring legal foreign guest workers, Looper and Democratic Sen. Abel Tapia drafted legislation to create a state office to assist with the logistics of clearing guest workers for jobs in Colorado; under their proposal, the state of Colorado would seek a waiver from the federal government to process H-2A visas applications, including operating a guest-worker screening office in Mexico. The bill, which also contained a provision requiring that guest workers have 20% of their wages withheld until they returned to their home countries, was criticized as a possible violation of federal law. After 26 amendments, including removal of the wage withholding provision, the bill passed House committee with support from farming and ranching groups.

Looper's guest-worker bill became the center of controversy and widespread attention in April, when Rep. Douglas Bruce made controversial comments concerning guest workers during House debate. Looper had previously received death threats for sponsoring the bill, and received additional threats in the wake of the controversy. The bill ultimately passed both houses of the legislature, and was signed into law by Gov. Ritter.

Continuing her work on toll road legislation, Looper again sponsored a bill to alter the reporting and disclosure requirements surrounding planned toll roads, in an effort to reduce the property value impact on homeowners who live within a proposed toll road corridor. The bill was met with opposition from some toll road opponents for being ineffective at halting toll road development, and Looper herself postponed consideration of the bill in favor of a more expansive measured introduced by Rep. Debbie Stafford. Stafford's bill, however, was killed in a House committee, and Looper's measure passed the state house.

Looper has also introduced legislation to require property buyers to be informed of paperwork tracking residential well ownership, and sponsored a bill to allow judges to include restorative justice as part of sentencing for juveniles.

Following the legislative session, Looper was recognized by the Colorado Farm Bureau with their 2008 Pinnacle Award for legislative support of agriculture. In December 2008, she was named Colorado Legislator of the Year by the Rocky Mountain Farmers Union, citing her guest worker legislation.

=== 2008 election ===
In the 2008 Congressional election, Looper supported Bentley Rayburn's challenge to incumbent Rep. Doug Lamborn in the Republican party primary for Colorado's 5th congressional district. Looper also stood against some fellow Republicans by opposing Amendment 52, a ballot measure on the November ballot that would reallocate some severance tax revenue from water projects to transportation.

Looper herself sought a second term in the legislature, facing Democrat Jimmy Phillips. Looper's re-election bid was endorsed by the Denver Post. She won re-election with 67 percent of the popular vote.

=== 2009 legislative session ===
For the 2009 legislative session, Looper was named to seats on the House Agriculture, Livestock, and Natural Resources Committee and the House Transportation and Energy Committee. Looper sponsored bills to expand unemployment benefits for the spouses of Colorado military personnel killed in the line of duty, to pilot test electronic online voting for military personnel, and to extend the statute of limitations for vehicular homicides. Looper was also the House sponsor of a proposal to create a Fountain Creek Watershed, Flood Control and Greenway District in Pueblo and El Paso counties,

Looper's most prominent legislative work during 2009 session surrounded two proposals on rainwater harvesting, previously not allowed under Colorado's prior appropriation water rights law. Looper was the Senate sponsor of a bill to allow residents on wells to collect rainwater, which was signed by Gov. Ritter, revising more than a century of Colorado water law. Another proposal sponsored by Looper and enacted into law created a pilot program to study the effects of rainwater diversion for landscaping in mixed-use developments.

=== 2010 legislative session ===
During the 2010 legislative session, Looper sponsored a bill to allow the creation of Veterans' court, and sponsored legislation revise how Colorado's $1.50/tire recycling fee is spent, after proposals to use the funds for purposes other than tire disposal, and in response to the growth of tire dumps in her district. With Democratic Rep. Joe Rice, Looper introduced legislation to require automobile manufacturers to, when opening a dealership in a market where they had previously closed one, offer right of first refusal the previous dealer. After having passed the state house, a brief but intense lobbying campaign against the bill by Chrysler and General Motors resulted in some concessions to automobile makers before the bill moved forward in the Colorado Senate. In February, Looper introduced a measure to block the transfer of prisoners held at the Guantanamo Bay detention camp to facilities in Colorado.

In March 2010, Looper was one of four legislators named by Gov. Ritter to a 12-member Carbon Capture and Sequestration Task force, convened to consider "complex legal, regulatory and policy issues" surrounding the topic.
