= Geitner =

Geitner is a surname. Notable people with the surname include:

- Ernst August Geitner (1783–1852), German chemist, prominent in development of nickel silver
- Kurt von Geitner (1884-1968), German soldier and defendant at Nuremberg in Hostages Trial
- Tim Geitner (Colorado politician)
- Thomas Geitner (born 1955), German-born journalist

== See also ==
Timothy Geithner (born 1961), American economist and Secretary of the Treasury
