= Paint mines =

Paint mines may refer to:

- Calhan Paint Mines Archeological District
- Paintball equipment
