= Terri Carver =

American judge advocate, lawyer, and politician from Colorado

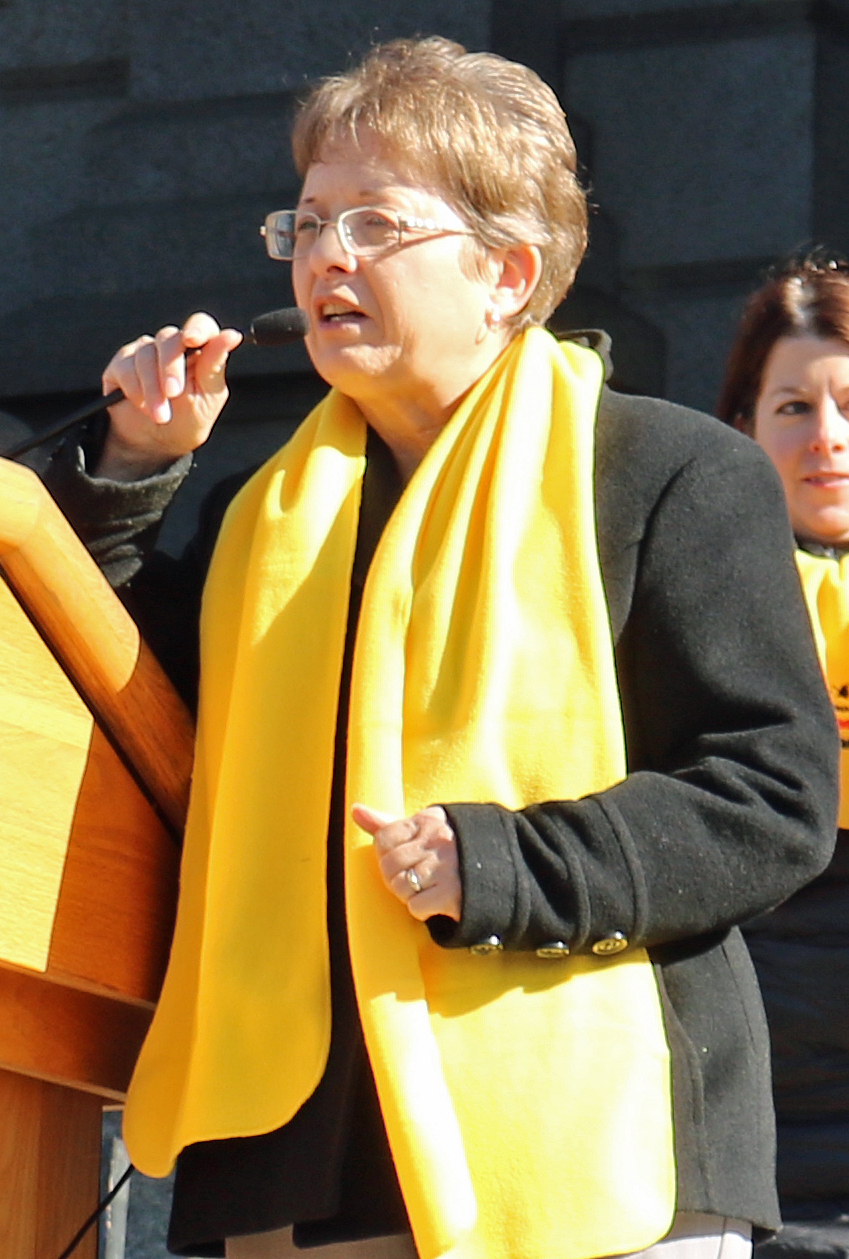
- Carver addressing an audience in 2017.

Member of the Colorado House of Representatives from the 20th district
- In office January 7, 2015 – January 9, 2023
- Preceded by: Bob Gardner
- Succeeded by: Redistricted

Personal details
- Party: Republican
- Occupation: Judge advocate, lawyer, politician

Terri Carver is a former state representative and candidate for state senator from Colorado Springs, Colorado. A Republican, Carver represented Colorado House of Representatives District 20, which encompassed several communities in El Paso County, including Air Force Academy, Cascade, Chipita Park, Colorado Springs, Green Mountain Falls, and Palmer Lake. She served in the state house from January 2015 to January 2023.

== Career ==
From 1986 to 2014, Carver was a colonel in the Judge Advocate General's Corps (JAG) for the U.S. Air Force Reserve. From 1994 to 2008, Carver worked as a civilian lawyer for the Air Force Space Command.

== Awards ==
- 2018 Legislator of the Year Award. Presented by Colorado Association of REALTORS.
- 2019 Elected Women of Excellence Award. Presented by National Foundation for Women Legislators.

== 2026 state senate race ==
In 2026, Carver is a candidate to represent Colorado's 9th Senate district. In the Republican primary election held June 30th, she defeated incumbent Lynda Zamora Wilson, who was appointed to the office in June 2025.
