= Kent Lambert =

American politician

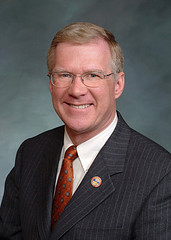

Member of the Colorado Senate from the 9th district
- In office January 2011 – January 4, 2019
- Preceded by: David Schultheis
- Succeeded by: Paul Lundeen

Member of the Colorado House of Representatives from the 59th district
- In office January 2007 – January 2011
- Succeeded by: Janak Joshi

Personal details
- Party: Republican
- Spouse: Gretchen
- Profession: retired Air Force Colonel

Kent Douglas Lambert is a former legislator in the U.S. state of Colorado. A United States Air Force veteran, Lambert was elected to the Colorado General Assembly as a Republican in 2006. Most recently, he represented Senate District 9, which encompasses northwest Colorado Springs, the United States Air Force Academy, Monument and Black Forest.

== Biography and early career ==
Lambert attended the United States Air Force Academy, where he served on the Cadet Wing Staff and was chairman of the Cadet Professional Ethics Committee. He was commissioned from the academy in 1974, earning a B.S. in military history.

Lambert served as a B-52 instructor pilot, and was director of battle staff for a B-52 wing. He rose from scientific analyst to division chief within the Air Force Studies and Analyses Agency at The Pentagon and worked on policy studies for major military systems, including bomber and intercontinental ballistic missile forces. He was deputy defense intelligence officer for Europe in the Defense Intelligence Agency. Lambert worked as an attaché at several international postings, serving as the air attaché and deputy chief of military assistance program, in Amman, Jordan, and as the defense attaché and chief of the Office of Defense Cooperation, Stockholm, Sweden. He was assigned to Air Force Space Command in 2001 as deputy director of the Space Analysis Division, where his duties included support for investigation of the Space Shuttle Columbia disaster.

While in the military, Lambert graduated from the Air War College, earned a master's degree in international relations from the University of Southern California in 1981, a master's in strategic and tactical sciences from the Air Force Institute of Technology in 1983, and a graduate studies certification in command, control, and communications from Air Force Institute of Technology. His awards include the Legion of Merit, the Defense Meritorious Service Medal, the Meritorious Service Medal with oak leaf cluster, the Southwest Asia Service Medal with star, and the Combat Readiness Medal with oak leaf cluster. He is also a lieutenant colonel with the Colorado Civil Air Patrol.

Lambert and his wife, Gretchen, have three children and six grandchildren. He has served as a leader in several churches and was an Eagle Scout and scoutmaster.

== Political career ==
=== Early campaigns ===
After retiring from the Air Force at the rank of colonel in 2004, Lambert entered Colorado politics, challenging Michael Merrifield for the 18th house district seat in central Colorado Springs, losing with 42 percent of the vote. He served as legislative assistant to representatives Dave Schultheis and Keith King and helped found the Republican Study Committee of Colorado, serving as its executive director until 2005.

In 2006, Lambert ran to succeed Rep. David Schultheis, who was elected to the Colorado Senate that same year. Lambert faced Colin Mullaney in the Republican primary, in which he garnered the endorsements of the Minutemen PAC, the Rocky Mountain Gun Owners, and a homeschoolers PAC. In the general election, he defeated Democrat Karen Teja with over 68 percent of the popular vote.

== Colorado House of Representatives ==
=== 2007 legislative session ===
During the 2007 session of the Colorado General Assembly, Lambert sat on the House Finance Committee and the House State, Veterans, and Military Affairs Committee.

In his first year in the legislature, Lambert was noted for his conservative stances on legislation. He was the primary house sponsor of a senate bill that would have criminalized abortion in Colorado —the bill died in the Colorado State Senate — and he spoke out against a measure that would have allowed adoption by homosexual couples. All five bills introduced by Lambert were defeated in House committees, including measures to make Colorado a right-to-work state and to prohibit labor unions from deducting fees from government employees' paychecks.

During the legislative session, Lambert filed a formal ethics complaint against the Colorado Education Association, arguing that emails sent by the CEA lobbying in favor of a property tax freeze to bring in additional revenue for public schools included deceptive statements. The complaint was called "frivolous" by the CEA and was dismissed by the Colorado Legislative Council's executive committee on a vote that was boycotted by Republican leaders.

For the session, the Colorado Union of Taxpayers gave Lambert its "Taxpayer Champion" award. Lambert, along with Rep. Douglas Bruce, was also noted for rarely supporting nonbinding resolutions in the legislature.

=== 2008 legislative session ===
In the 2008 session of the Colorado General Assembly, Lambert sat on the House Finance Committee, and the House State, Veterans, and Military Affairs Committee. One piece of legislation he introduced created a specialty license plate commemorating the 100th anniversary of the Boy Scouts of America.

In April 2008, Lambert filed a campaign finance complaint against Gov. Bill Ritter, alleging that Ritter's 2006 campaign manager, Greg Kolomitz, improperly used inaugural committee funds to pay himself and pay off campaign debts. In August, Lambert's complaint was dismissed by an administrative law judge, and he was ordered to pay Ritter's legal fees. The ruling was overturned by the Court of Appeals, and Ritter eventually admitted the charges against him after his announcement not to run for a second term.

=== 2008 election ===
In 2008, Lambert won a second term in the Colorado House of Representatives. He was opposed by Democratic nominee Chyrese Exline. Lambert's re-election bid was endorsed by the Denver Post, while the Colorado Springs Independent endorsed his opponent. Lambert won re-election with 71 percent of the popular vote.

Lambert was also a delegate to the 2008 Republican National Convention in St. Paul, Minnesota, alongside El Paso County Commissioner Wayne Williams and Colorado's Attorney General John Suthers.

=== 2009 legislative session ===
For the 2009 legislative session, Lambert was named to seats on the House State, Veterans, and Military Affairs Committee and the House Finance Committee, where he was the ranking Republican.

In August 2009, Lambert was appointed to the Joint Budget Committee to replace departing member Rep. Dan Marostica.

=== 2010 legislative session ===
For the 2010 legislative session, Lambert was on the House Appropriations Committee and the Joint Budget Committee.

Lambert produced a bill that focused on establishing an income tax credit for nonpublic education in the state of Colorado. HB10-1295 would have set forth, as a future tax credit, for families who either pay private school tuition or home-school their children. The bill was introduced to the House Finance Committee, where it was postponed indefinitely.

== Colorado Senate ==
=== 2010 election ===
In the 2010, Lambert ran for election to the 9th District Senate seat. He ran unopposed in both the primary and the general election, and won a 4-year term to the Colorado Senate.

=== 2011 legislative session ===
Following Lambert's election in 2010, he was elected by the Republican caucus to continue service on the Joint Budget Committee, as well as join the Senate Appropriations Committee.

During the 2011 legislative session, Lambert sought to remove unnecessary use of state vehicles for personal commuting with SB11-023, a measure he also ran previously as a representative in the Colorado House. In 2010 when the bill (HB10-1287) was initially run, it successfully made it through both chambers before eventually being vetoed by Governor Bill Ritter. The bill limits the use of state vehicles by private persons for personal business, and would have required an employee to reimburse the state for commuting with a state-owned vehicle for such use and openly labeled appropriate terms of use. The bill was assigned to the Senate Transportation Committee, but failed and was postponed indefinitely on a 5–2 vote. Lambert also sponsored several major bills pertaining to illegal immigrants: SB11-054 and HB11-1088.

Lambert was elected as a delegate to the 2012 Republican National Convention in Tampa Bay, Florida. He had been a committed delegate to Senator Rick Santorum before he dropped out of the presidential race.

=== 2012 legislative session ===
In 2012, Lambert brought forth a major piece of legislation regarding PERA transparency, SB12-084, which would have required PERA records of elected officials and cabinet-level appointees to be publicly disclosed and available for review. Lambert's bill was assigned to the Senate Finance Committee, where it was defeated in a committee vote and postponed indefinitely.

=== 2013 legislative session ===
In 2013, Lambert was re-elected by the Senate Republican Caucus to serve on the Joint Budget Committee for the Colorado General Assembly. He was also appointed to the Senate Appropriations Committee.

=== 2017 legislative session ===
In the 2017 legislative session, Lambert served as the chairman of the Joint Budget Committee and vice-chair of the Senate Appropriations Committee. He chairs the Legislative Emergency Preparedness, Response, and Recovery Committee and serves as vice-chair of the Opioid and Other Substance Use Disorders Interim Study Committee.

In addition to his responsibilities as the chair of the JBC, he ran a wide variety of bills, including Senate Bill 82 concerning the regulation of methadone clinics; Senate Bill 96, which created a grant program for the reserve peace officer academy program; Senate Bill 300 which would have created a high risk pool for impoverished citizens to obtain medical insurance through the state; and Senate Bill 297 that revised the requirements for higher education performance.
