= Tim Geitner =

American politician

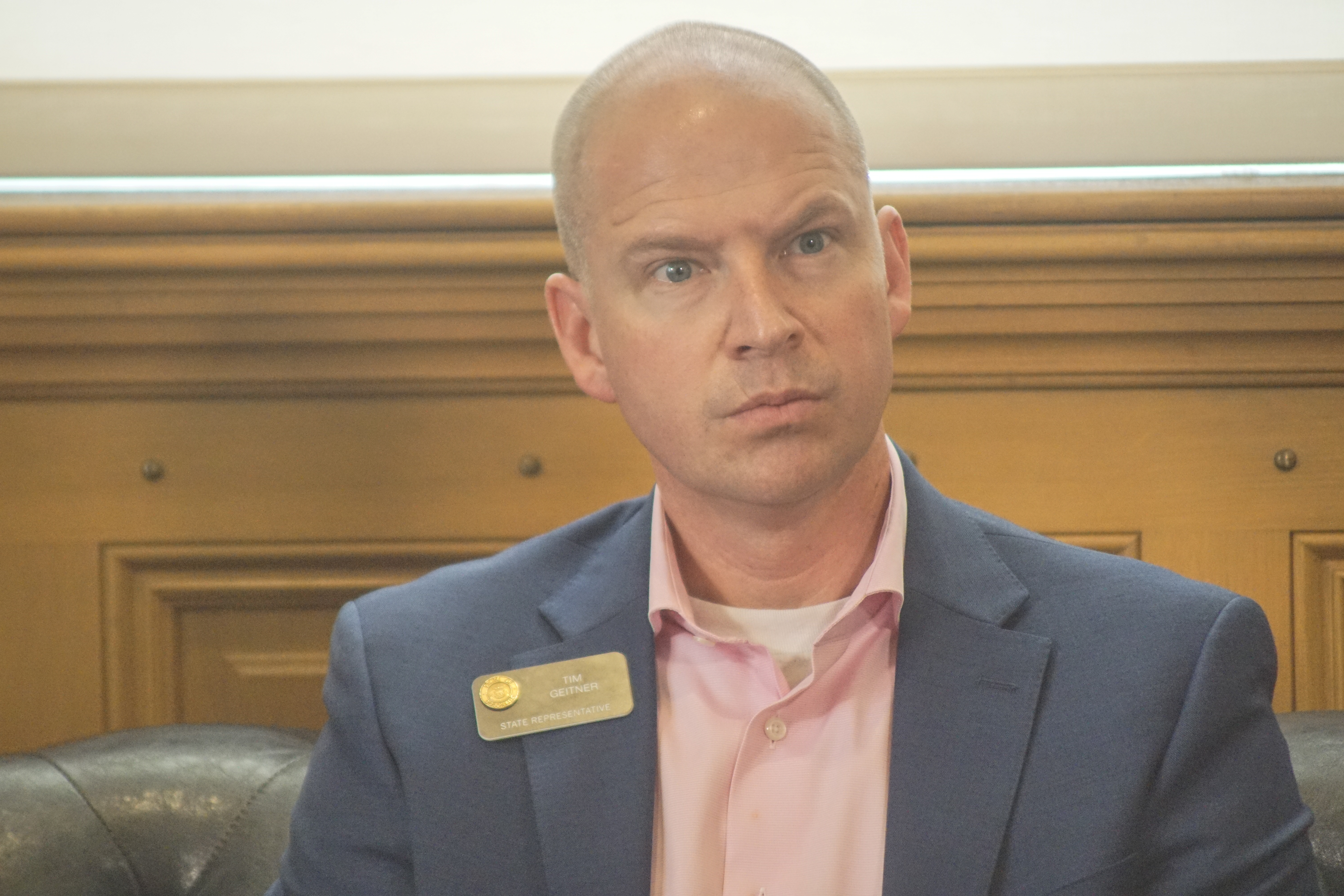
- Geitner in 2021

Member of the Colorado House of Representatives from the 19th district
- In office January 4, 2019 – October 7, 2022
- Preceded by: Paul Lundeen
- Succeeded by: Don Wilson

Personal details
- Party: Republican
- Spouse: Carrie
- Education: University of Central Florida (BBA); University of Colorado Colorado Springs (MPA)

Tim Geitner is a former state representative from El Paso County, Colorado. A Republican, Geitner represented Colorado House of Representatives District 19, which encompassed the El Paso County communities of Black Forest, Calhan, Ellicott, Gleneagle, Monument, Peyton, Ramah, and Woodmoor. He served on the House Education Committee, the House Legislative Council Committee, and the Legislative Interim Committee on School Finance.

== Political career ==
Geitner was first elected as a state representative in the 2018 general elections. In that election, he defeated his Democratic opponent, winning 75.94% of the vote.

In the 2020 elections, Geitner ran unopposed in the Republican primary and defeated Democratic nominee Joe Thompson in the general election, winning 48,521 votes to Thompson's 16,198.

As Assistant House Minority Leader, Geitner was the chamber's second-highest ranked Republican.

In February 2022, Geitner announced that he would not seek re-election in 2022. He resigned his House seat effective October 7, 2022.
