= Calhan station =

Historic railroad station in Colorado, United States

Calhan
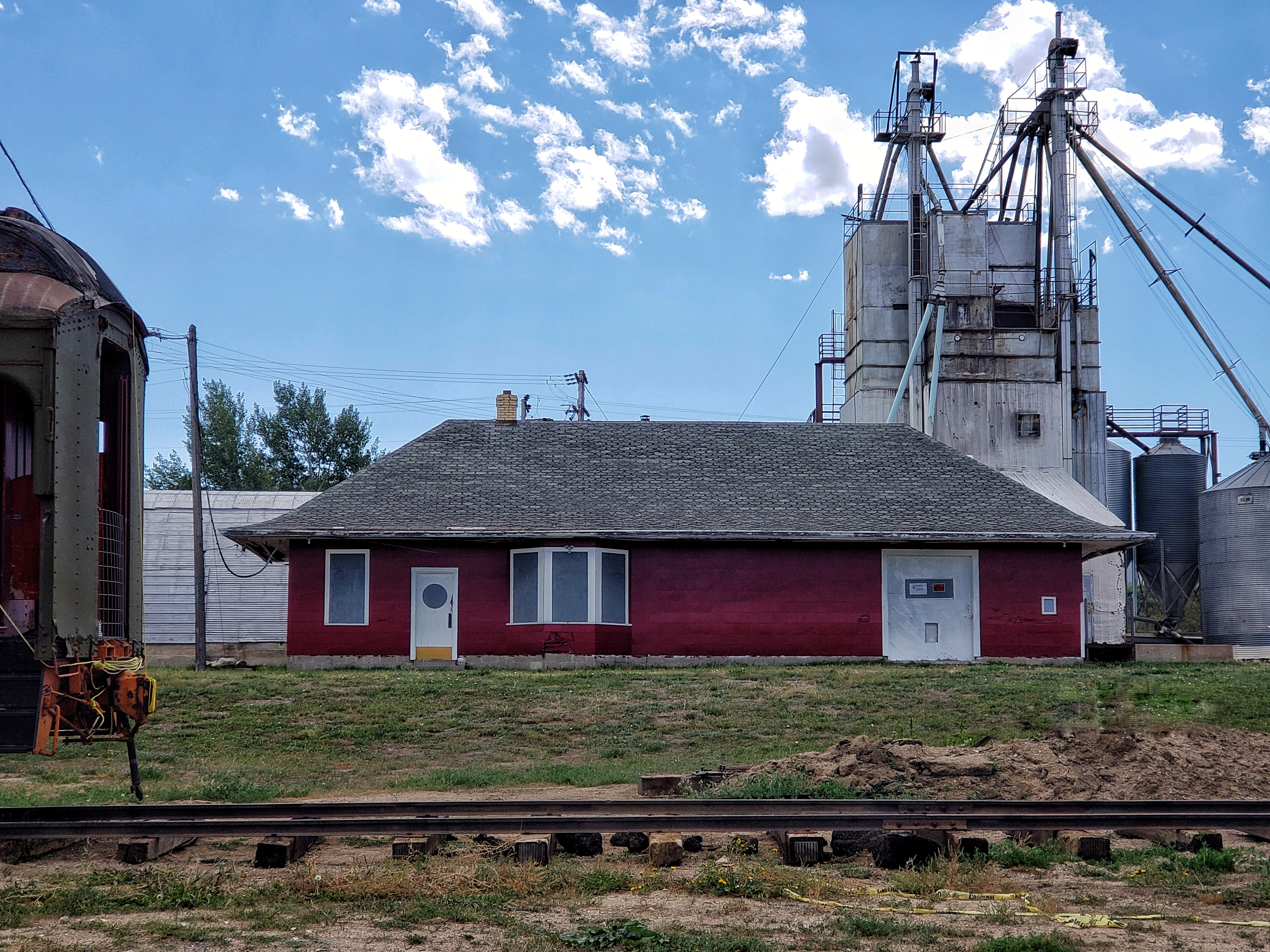

General information
- Location: 704 Fourth Street, Calhan, Colorado 80808
- System: Former Rock Island Line passenger rail station

History
- Rebuilt: 1906

Services
Preceding station	Chicago, Rock Island and Pacific Railroad	Following station
Peyton toward Colorado Springs	Main Line	Simla toward Chicago
- Calhan Rock Island Railroad Depot
- U.S. National Register of Historic Places
- Colorado State Register of Historic Properties No. 5EP.2173
- Location within Colorado Location within the United States
- Location: Calhan, Colorado
- Coordinates: 39°2′18″N 104°17′55″W
- NRHP reference No.: 95000476
- CSRHP No.: 5EP.2173

Significant dates
- Added to NRHP: April 20, 1995
- Designated CSRHP: 1995
Location

Calhan Rock Island Railroad Depot is a historic railroad station located in Calhan, Colorado, United States. The Chicago, Rock Island and Pacific Railroad provided transportation between Colorado Springs and Kansas until it went into bankruptcy in the early 1970s. The depot, built in 1906, still stands on its original site. (Note: There is a discrepancy between the History Colorado information and the National Register of Historic Places nomination form as to whether the Calhan depot is one, or one of three, Chicago, Rock Island and Pacific depots in Colorado that remain on their original site. History Colorado says that the depot is one of three still standing on its original site. The NRHP form, on page 6, delineates the status of the remaining intact depots as follows: It is thought that there were at least nine Colorado Rock Island stations between Colorado Springs and the state border with Kansas. The Calhan depot remains intact and at its original location. Four others are known to have been moved and altered: the Bethune station has been moved to Burlington, where it is preserved largely intact as part of a museum; the Peyton depot, moved to Calhan, where it was incorporated into the Methodist church; the depot from Seibert, moved to a location near Interstate 70 and converted to a gas station; and the Simla depot, moved to Strasburg and converted to a brick-clad private home. The NRHP document then summarizes: "The Calhan Depot is one of only two Rock Island depots in Colorado that are intact and it is the only such depot in its original location...") The rails were removed and sold for scrap by 1994.

== Depot station ==
The one story depot was built according to a common Rock Island depot plan at the time. It had a waiting room, ticket office, freight storage area and a pot belly coal stove. The building, about 24 by 64 feet (7.3 m × 19.5 m), had wood clapboard siding, and windows facing the train tracks in the passenger waiting area. Station personnel were able to view trains as they entered and left the station from a bay window. Later the wood siding was covered by asbestos siding and there was likely a change in window and door placement from the original design.
