= Paul Lundeen =

American politician

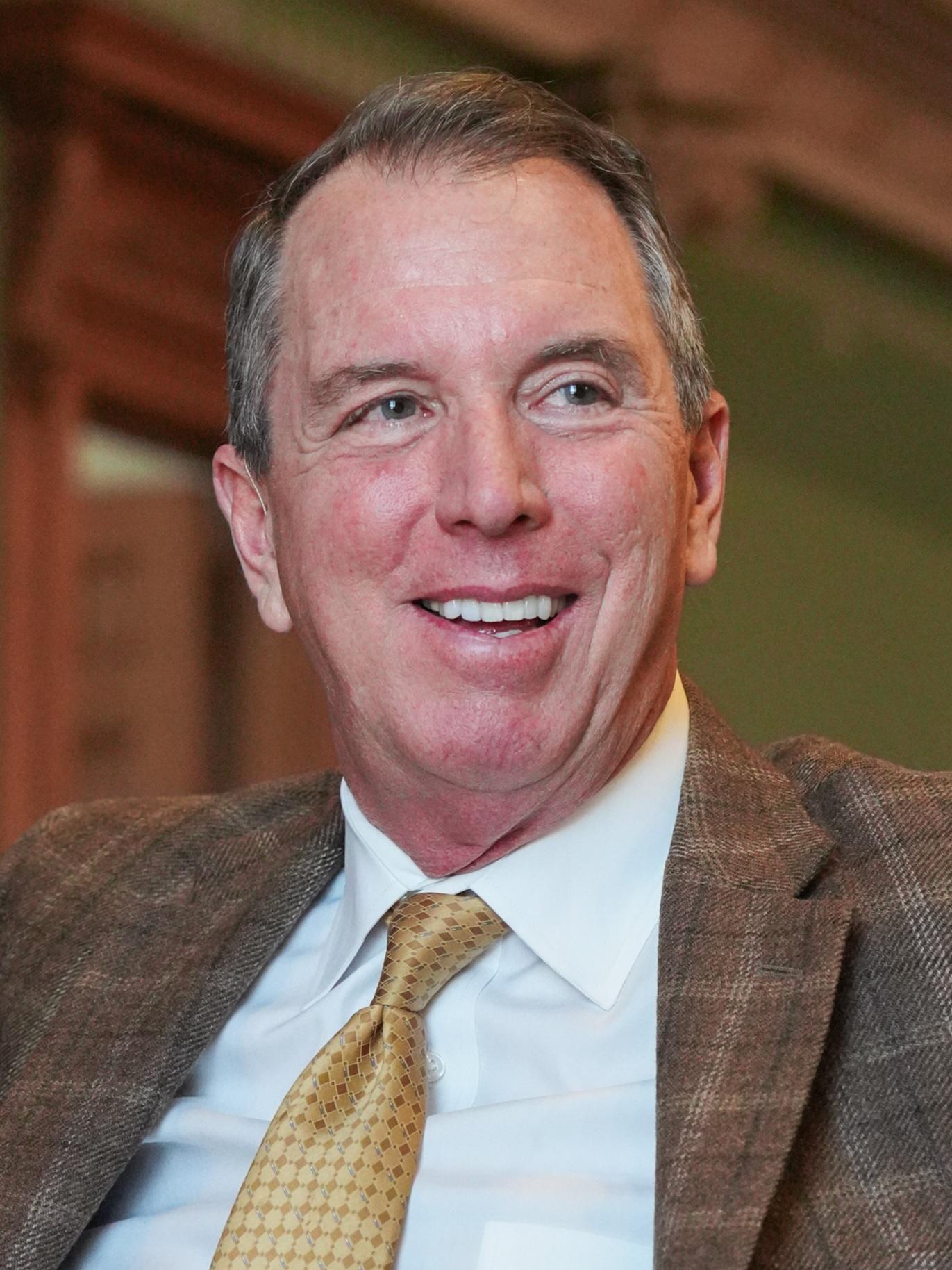
- Lundeen in 2023

Minority Leader of the Colorado Senate
- In office January 9, 2023 – June 9, 2025
- Preceded by: John Cooke
- Succeeded by: Cleave Simpson

Member of the Colorado Senate from the 9th district
- In office January 4, 2019 – June 9, 2025
- Preceded by: Kent Lambert
- Succeeded by: Lynda Zamora Wilson

Member of the Colorado House of Representatives from the 19th district
- In office January 7, 2015 – January 4, 2019
- Preceded by: Amy Stephens
- Succeeded by: Tim Geitner

Personal details
- Born: 1959 (age 66–67)
- Party: Republican
- Spouse: Connie
- Children: 2
- Education: University of Nebraska–Lincoln; New York University (BA)
- Occupation: Politician; businessman; journalist
- Website: Official website

Paul Lundeen (born 1959) is an American politician and former member of the Colorado General Assembly, who represented Colorado's 9th Senate District and 19th House district. Lundeen is a Republican and lives in Monument, Colorado. He attended the University of Nebraska–Lincoln as a Regent Scholar, later graduating from New York University with a Bachelor of Arts in journalism.

A businessman, Lundeen founded numerous small enterprises over more than three decades, including investment management, real estate development, and brain training and learning centers. Early in his career he served as a Washington correspondent and bureau chief on Capitol Hill, holding White House press credentials. He previously served on the Colorado State Board of Education, representing the Fifth District, and served as the Board's chair.

Lundeen served in the Colorado House of Representatives from 2015 to 2019 and in the Colorado State Senate from 2019 to 2025, including as Senate Minority Leader from January 2023 until his resignation on June 9, 2025. On that date, he announced he would become President and CEO of the American Excellence Foundation, a conservative non profit based in Washington, D.C.

== Early life and education ==
Lundeen was born in 1959 in Minden, Nebraska, where he was raised in a family with roots in farming and small business. His father operated a feed store; Lundeen has described growing up hearing discussions of small business at the kitchen table as formative in shaping his political philosophy of limited government and free markets.

Lundeen attended the University of Nebraska–Lincoln as a Regent Scholar, a merit distinction awarded to outstanding incoming students. He later transferred to New York University, graduating with a Bachelor of Arts degree in journalism in 1981.

Following graduation, Lundeen began his professional career as a Washington correspondent and bureau chief on Capitol Hill, where he held White House press credentials. He later transitioned to entrepreneurship in California and Colorado.

== Business career ==
Lundeen previously served on the Colorado State Board of Education, representing the Fifth District, and for a time he served as the Board's chair.

On June 9, 2025, Lundeen announced his resignation from the Colorado State Senate to be President and CEO of the American Excellence Foundation.

Prior to his public service career, Lundeen founded and operated numerous small businesses in California, Nebraska and Colorado over more than 30 years. These included Arkenstone Financial, an investment management firm; brain training and learning centers; national and international marketing services; real estate development; and golf course association landscape management.

== Political career ==
=== Colorado State Board of Education (2010–2014) ===
Lundeen served on the Colorado State Board of Education from 2010 to 2014, representing the Fifth Congressional District. During his tenure he served as the Board's chairman, championing parental choice in education, charter school expansion, and academic free markets. He was succeeded on the Board by Steven J. Durham in December 2014.

Lundeen was first elected to the State House in 2014. He ran unopposed in both the Republican primary and the general election.

2014 Colorado House of Representatives election, District 19
Party	Candidate	Votes	%
Republican	Paul Lundeen	31,519	100.00%
Total votes		31,519	100%
Republican hold			

In 2016, Lundeen was re-elected. In the general election, he won 79.59% of the vote against his Democratic opponent.

2016 Colorado House of Representatives election, District 19
Party	Candidate	Votes	%
Republican	Paul Lundeen (incumbent)	40,011	79.59%
Democratic	Tom Reynolds	10,258	20.41%
Total votes		50,269	100%
Republican hold			

In June, 2017, Lundeen announced that in the 2018 elections he would seek the District 9 State Senate seat currently held by Kent Lambert, who is term limited. Lambert immediately endorsed Lundeen.

2018 Colorado Senate election, 9th District
Party	Candidate	Votes	%
Republican	Paul Lundeen	61,341	70.3%
Democratic	Gil Armendariz	25,892	29.7%
Total votes		87,233	100%
Republican hold			

Running for reelection in 2022, Lundeen won the Republican primary held on June 28, and in the 2022 Colorado Senate general election, Lundeen defeated his Democratic Party and Libertarian Party opponents, winning 62.31% of the total votes cast.

2022 Colorado Senate Republican primary, 9th District
Party	Candidate	Votes	%
Republican	Paul Lundeen (incumbent)	20,470	66.4%
Republican	Lynda Zamora Wilson	10,378	33.6%
Total votes		30,848	100%

2022 Colorado Senate election, 9th District
Party	Candidate	Votes	%
Republican	Paul Lundeen (incumbent)	50,266	62.3%
Democratic	Arik Dougherty	28,327	35.1%
Libertarian	Stephen Darnell	2,075	2.6%
Total votes		80,668	100%
Republican hold			

== Legislative record ==
=== Education finance ===
Lundeen co-sponsored House Bill 24-1448, a bill to rewrite Colorado's public school finance formula, which had not been significantly revised since 1994. The bill was introduced in April 2024 alongside House Speaker Julie McCluskie (D), Rep. Jennifer Bacon (D), and Sen. Rachel Zenzinger (D).

The bill passed the Senate 28–7 and was signed by Governor Polis on May 23, 2024. It restructured per-pupil funding weights to increase allocations for at risk students, English language learners, students with disabilities, and rural districts.

In 2025, Lundeen co-sponsored House Bill 25-1320 (the 2025 School Finance Act), which adjusted funding levels under the new formula for the 2025–26 school year. Governor Polis signed the bill on May 23, 2025.

Lundeen served on the Senate Education Committee throughout his legislative tenure.

=== Human trafficking ===
Lundeen co-sponsored Senate Bill 18-084 (2018), which would have created a statutory presumption that minors engaged in prostitution related conduct are victims of human trafficking, requiring referral to child services. The bill passed the Senate Health and Human Services Committee but was postponed indefinitely in the Senate Judiciary Committee.

He co-sponsored Senate Bill 19-185 (2019), introduced by Sen. Rhonda Fields, which established criminal immunity for minors who are victims of human trafficking. The bill was signed into law in June 2019. Lundeen was among the sponsors of Senate Bill 24-035 (2024), which added human trafficking to the list of crimes of violence subject to enhanced sentencing and extended the statute of limitations for trafficking offenses. Governor Polis signed the bill on April 11, 2024.

=== Other sponsored legislation ===
According to the Colorado General Assembly's records, Lundeen's name appears on more than 150 bills and resolutions across his eleven sessions. In a 2020 interview with Colorado Politics, Lundeen described his approach to education funding, saying the existing formula focused on sustaining the system rather than individual student needs.

== Political position ==
=== Education and school choice ===
Lundeen has supported school choice policies throughout his political career, including charter school expansion and increased parental choice in education. In a 2020 interview, he noted that charter school enrollment in Colorado had grown to approximately 124,000 students, representing about 13% of the student population.

=== Election integrity ===
In February 2021, a Colorado Senate panel rejected SB21-007, a bill sponsored by Lundeen that would have replaced Colorado's default mail-ballot system with in-person voting as the default, with mail voting available only to those who opted in. Colorado Politics reported the bill received opposition from election officials and advocates.

In March 2021, Lundeen attended a panel event in Colorado Springs at which claims were made that the 2020 United States presidential election results were fraudulent. During remarks, Lundeen expressed doubt about the validity of the election results in Colorado, according to the Colorado Times Recorder.

== Resignation and post-legislative career ==
On June 9, 2025, Lundeen announced his resignation from the Colorado State Senate, effective immediately, to become President and CEO of the American Excellence Foundation (AEF), a conservative non profit based in Washington, D.C. that awards grants to advance conservative public policy. He stated he would remain living in Colorado.

In his resignation statement Lundeen said: "Serving Colorado has been an honor and blessing. I am grateful to the people of Senate District 9 for the opportunity to fight for policies that empower individuals, protect our communities, and promote prosperity. As I transition to a national platform, I am eager to continue advocating for personal freedom, economic opportunity and common-sense conservative values".

== Personal life ==
Lundeen and his wife, Connie Lundeen, have two children. The family resides in Monument, Colorado, within the district he represented as state senator.

Colorado Senate
Preceded by John Cooke	Minority Leader of the Colorado Senate; 2023–2025	Succeeded by Cleave Simpson
