= David Schultheis =

American politician

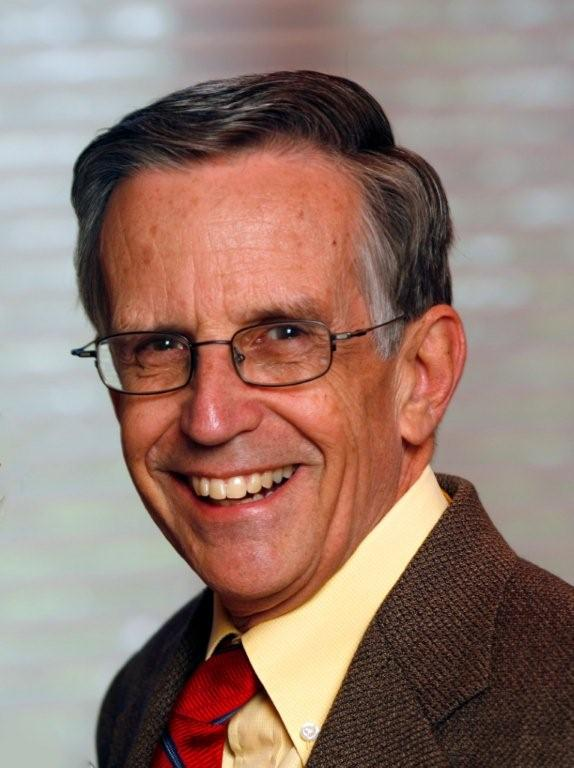

Member of the Colorado Senate from the 9th district
- In office 2007–2011
- Preceded by: Doug Lamborn
- Succeeded by: Kent Lambert

Member of the Colorado House of Representatives from the 14th district
- In office 2001–2007
- Succeeded by: Kent Lambert

Personal details
- Born: July 19, 1940 (age 86) Los Angeles, California, U.S.
- Party: Republican
- Spouse: Sandra
- Profession: businessman, real estate

David Schultheis (born July 19, 1940) is an American businessman and former Republican member of the Colorado Senate, representing the 9th district from 2007 to 2011. Previously he was a member of the Colorado House of Representatives from 2000 to 2007.

== Biography ==
Schultheis has lived in Colorado Springs, Colorado since 1992, before which he lived in California. He is known for his conservative views, particularly regarding education and illegal immigration to the United States. He has been married to his wife, Sandra, for 42 years and has two daughters and five grandsons. Schultheis is an Eagle Scout.

== Legislative career ==
Schultheis is a strong opponent of abortion and illegal immigration. He has sponsored numerous pieces of legislation that would crack down on illegal immigration.

In 2009, he created controversy by stating he hoped babies born from mothers with HIV were born with severe cases of AIDS to punish the mothers. He voted against Senate Bill 179, which requires health care providers treating pregnant women to test those women for HIV unless they opt out. This provision is intended to ensure that steps can be taken to prevent mother to child transmission of the disease if the mother is infected. Schultheis claimed that HIV infection was the result of "sexual promiscuity for the most part", and that the point of the proposed legislation was " . . . to remove the consequences of poor behavior, unacceptable behavior, quite frankly. I'm not convinced that part of the role of government should be to protect individuals from the negative consequences of their actions."

Again in 2009, Schultheis stirred up controversy by posting to his Twitter account, "[President Barack Obama is] flying the U.S. plane right into the ground." He then ended his tweet with the phrase "Let's roll," the signature sign-off of Flight 93 before reclaiming the hijacked plane during the 9/11 terrorist attacks on the U.S. Trade Towers in New York. The next day, Schultheis made clear his remarks were not intended to compare President Barack Obama to terrorist hijackers, but to express his rage against the president's fiscal policies. Evidence suggests the clarification was made in response to demands that he retract his statement by Colorado Senate President Brandon Shaffer and public admonishment by State Senate Minority Leader Josh Penry.
