= Trista Vick-Majors =

American Antarctic biogeochemist and microbial ecologist

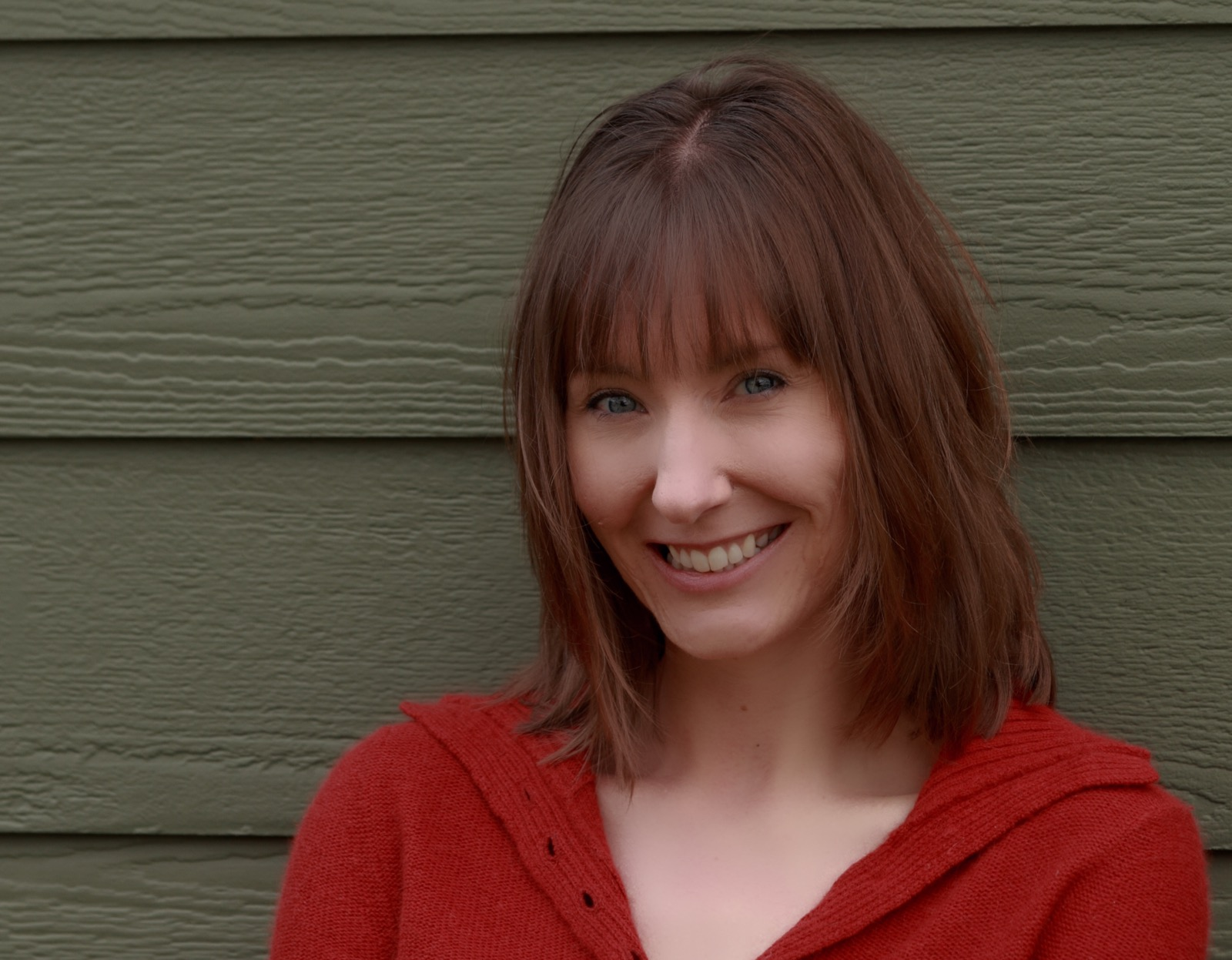
- Education: Colorado College (BA); Montana State University (MS, PhD)
- Scientific career
- Fields: Biogeochemisty; Microbial ecology
- Workplaces: BSc Colorado College; PhD Montana State University; Assistant Professor Michigan Technological University
- Website: http://www.whereverthereswater.org

Trista Vick-Majors is an American Assistant Professor in Biological Sciences at Michigan Tech. She is an Antarctic biogeochemist and microbial ecologist, best known for her work showing that microorganisms are present under the Antarctic ice sheet.

== Early life and education ==
Vick-Majors grew up in Calhan, Colorado and completed her BA in biology at Colorado College in 2003. Vick-Majors spent two years studying the microbial ecology of hot springs at the University of Nevada-Las Vegas and graduated with her MSc from Montana State University in 2010. Vick-Majors earned her PhD in Ecology and Environmental Sciences from Montana State University in 2016.

Vick-Majors’ MSc work focused on the responses of heterotrophic microorganisms to the onset of the polar night in Antarctica, while her PhD focused on microbial ecology and biogeochemistry in Subglacial Lake Whillans and under the McMurdo Ice Shelf.

== Career and impact ==
Vick-Majors is a biogeochemist and microbial ecologist with interests in carbon biogeochemistry, polar environments, aquatic ecology, and subglacial ecosystems. Vick-Majors began working in the Antarctic in 2008 as part of an International Polar Year-funded project to study ecosystem responses to the Antarctic Polar Night – the first expedition of its kind, and has since been involved in Antarctic expeditions to the McMurdo Dry Valleys, the McMurdo Ice Shelf, Subglacial Lake Whillans in West Antarctica, and to the Ross Ice Shelf.

Vick-Majors was part of the first field team (the Whillans Ice Stream Subglacial Access Research and Drilling project (WISSARD)) to successfully obtain samples from an Antarctic subglacial lake. Her work with WISSARD showed that microorganisms are present under the Antarctic ice sheet.

Vick-Majors has contributed to the advancement of early career researchers in the polar sciences through her work with the Association of Polar Early Career Scientists and to public education and outreach efforts, and the popular press.

== Awards and honours ==
Vick-Majors was awarded the American Fellowship by the American Association of University Women in 2014, to support her dissertation work and in recognition of her commitment to helping women and girls through service to her community. Vick-Majors has also been a fellow of the Institute on Ecosystems (2014 and 2015) and the Montana Space Grant Consortium. In 2015, she received the American Society for Microbiology Travel Award ($500) and the Institute on Ecosystems Graduate Research Fellow ($750).

== Selected bibliography ==
- Vick, TJ; Dodsworth, Jeremy A; Costa, KC; Shock, EL; Hedlund, Brian P; (2010) Microbiology and geochemistry of Little Hot Creek, a hot spring environment in the Long Valley Caldera. Geobiology 8(2)140-154
- Christner, Brent C; Priscu, John C; Achberger, Amanda M; Barbante, Carlo; Carter, Sasha P; Christianson, Knut; Michaud, Alexander B; Mikucki, Jill A; Mitchell, Andrew C; Skidmore, Mark L, Vick-Majors, Trista J. (2014) A microbial ecosystem beneath the West Antarctic ice sheet Nature 512,7514:310-313.
- Vick-Majors, Trista J; Priscu, John C; Amaral-Zettler, Linda A (2014) Modular community structure suggests metabolic plasticity during the transition to polar night in ice-covered Antarctic lakes, The ISME Journal 8:4,778-789
