= Lynda Zamora Wilson =

American politician

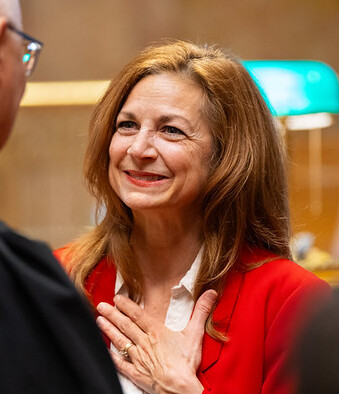

Member of the Colorado Senate from the 9th district
- Incumbent
- Assumed office July 8, 2025
- Preceded by: Paul Lundeen

Personal details
- Party: Republican
- Education: United States Air Force Academy

Lynda Zamora Wilson is an American politician and former United States Air Force officer from El Paso County, Colorado. A Republican, Zamora Wilson currently represents Colorado's 9th Senate district, which covers the northern suburbs of Colorado Springs in El Paso County, and parts of Falcon and Colorado Springs proper. The district is also home to the United States Air Force Academy.

Wilson was selected by vacancy committee to represent Senate District 9 following the resignation of Senator Paul Lundeen.

== Background ==
Lynda Zamora Wilson served in the United States Air Force for 25 years where she served as an analyst at the Pentagon, and as an associate professor of economics at the United States Air Force Academy.

== Electoral history ==
Wilson had previously sought the Republican nomination for Colorado's 9th Senate district in the 2022 Colorado Senate election, challenging incumbent Senator Paul Lundeen. Wilson decisively lost the primary election, securing 10,378 of the 30,849 total votes cast. Wilson questioned the outcome of her primary loss to Lundeen and fundraised over $20,000 to pay for a recount, which only reaffirmed her overwhelming defeat.

In June 2025, Wilson was selected by a vacancy committee to represent the district after Lundeen resigned.

In 2026, Wilson sought election to the office to which she was appointed. However, in the Republican primary election held June 30, she was defeated by former state representative Terri Carver.
