= Amy Stephens =

American politician and lawyer

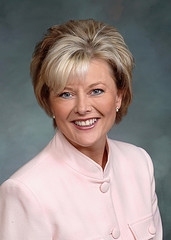

Member of the Colorado House of Representatives from the 19th district
- In office January 9, 2013 – January 7, 2015
- Preceded by: Marsha Looper
- Succeeded by: Paul Lundeen

Member of the Colorado House of Representatives from the 20th district
- In office January 10, 2007 – January 9, 2013
- Preceded by: Lynn Hefley
- Succeeded by: Bob Gardner

Personal details
- Born: New Orleans, Louisiana, U.S.
- Party: Republican
- Spouse: Ron Stephens
- Education: University of California, Los; Angeles; California State University, Fullerton; University of Colorado, Colorado Springs

Amy Stephens is a Principal in Public Policy and Regulation Practice at Dentons, a multinational law firm; previously, she served as Colorado House Majority Leader and House Minority Caucus Chairman in the Colorado House of Representatives.

== Biography ==
Stephens attended the University of California at Los Angeles and then California State University Fullerton, earning a bachelor's degree in communications. From 1991 to 2001, she worked as a public policy and youth culture specialist for the Christian ministry Focus on the Family. A sexual risk avoidance curriculum written by Stephens, No Apologies, has been translated into over a dozen languages. After leaving Focus on the Family, Stephens founded the consulting firm Fresh Ideas Communication & Consulting, assisting non-profit and faith-based organizations with communication, organization, and development issues. She also served as a panel expert on federal grant review committees for the federal Department of Health & Human Services.

Before running for the legislature herself, Stephens was a veteran of numerous Republican campaigns, including those of Colorado Governor Bill Owens, 4th Judicial District Attorney John Newsome, El Paso County Commissioner Wayne Williams, and U.S. President George W. Bush. She served as a member of the El Paso County Republican Committee and as a delegate to the 1996 and 2004 Republican National Conventions. Governor Owens also appointed Stephens to the Governor's Commission on the Welfare of Children.

Elected to the Colorado House of Representatives as a Republican in 2006, Stephens represented House District 20, which covers northern El Paso County, Colorado, including portions of Colorado Springs and the areas surrounding the United States Air Force Academy. She served as the House Majority Leader during the two years of Republican control of the House from 2010 to 2012. Following redistricting, Stephens was elected as the representative for Colorado's 19th House District. She sought the Republican nomination to challenge then-U.S. Senator Mark Udall in 2014, but withdrew from the race on February 27, 2014. In 2015 she was hired by Dentons, the world's largest global law firm, to lead their Denver Government Affairs practice.

Stephens is married; she and her husband, Ron (former Town of Monument Trustee), have one son, Nicholas.

== Political career ==
=== 2006 election ===
In 2006, Stephens won a 3:1 victory over Democratic opponent Jan Hejtmanek in an overwhelmingly Republican district. During her campaign, Stephens identified infrastructure issues, including water, as among her major legislative concerns.

=== 2007 legislative session ===
In the 2007 session of the state legislature, Stephens sat on the House Judiciary Committee and was the ranking Republican on the House Business & Labor Affairs Committee. Four bills introduced by Rep. Stephens were passed by the General Assembly, most prominently a measure that would prohibit criminal charges against illegal immigrants from being dismissed without their deportation. In November 2007, upon Rep. Bill Cadman's appointment to the Colorado Senate, the first-term legislator was elected to succeed him as House Minority Caucus Chair.

=== 2008 legislative session ===
In the 2008 session of the Colorado General Assembly, Stephens sat on the House Business Affairs and Labor Committee and the House Judiciary Committee. Stephens sponsored a bill to tax in-room pay-per-view movies sold by hotels to fund child advocacy centers; after facing opposition from the hotel industry, Stephen asked for the bill to be killed in committee. Stephens also sponsored a bill, passed by the General Assembly, to streamline the teaching licensure application process for military spouses, and sponsored another bill to provide unemployment benefits to military spouses forced to relocate out of state. She sponsored successful legislation to require hospitals to publicly publish charges for common medical procedures. Stephens led Republican opposition to the 2008 state budget, criticizing it for excessive spending.

=== 2008 election ===
Stephens again faced Democrat Jan Hejtmanek in the November 2008 legislative election.

In September 2008, Stephens was named to the "Palin Truth Squad," representatives of the McCain-Palin presidential campaign tasked with countering alleged distortions concerning the record of Republican vice-presidential candidate Sarah Palin. In that capacity, she made a number of media statements in support of Palin during the 2008 presidential campaign, spoke at an October rally in Colorado Springs featuring Palin, and delivered the invocation at a Denver rally featuring John McCain. In October, Stephens, with other Republican legislators, participated in a statewide "Save, Don't Spend" RV Tour critical of Democratic policies.

After winning re-election with 76 percent of the popular vote, Stephens was also re-elected Minority Caucus Chair by House Republicans, fending off a challenge for the post from Rep. Ellen Roberts.

=== 2009 legislative session ===
With Democratic Rep. Joe Rice, Stephens sponsored legislation allowing health insurance providers to offer discounts for participation in wellness programs. Responding to a deal between labor and business leaders to remove several statewide referendums from the 2008 general election ballot, Stephens introduced legislation that would prohibit financial deals that would impact initiatives on Colorado election ballots. The measure was defeated in a House committee.

=== 2012 election ===
As a consequence of redistricting in the state of Colorado, Representative Stephens ran for the State House in the 19th House District. The seat was previously held by Republican legislator Marsha Looper since the 2006 general election. Representative Stephens faced third party challengers from the ACN and Libertarian parties, but was reelected with over 80% of the vote.

=== 2013 Legislative Session ===
In the 2013 session of the Colorado General Assembly, Stephens sat as Ranking Member on the House Health, Insurance & Environment Committee and House Public Health Care & Human Services Committee. Stephens played a critical role in passing a bill that identifies mandatory reporters for incidents of elder abuse and applies a class 3 misdemeanor as a penalty for failing to do so (SB 111 Require Reports Of Elder Abuse and Exploitation). She also made it easier for mental health care providers from other states to work in treatment facilities operated by the U.S. Armed Forces (HB 1065 Federal Professionals Mental Health Authority). Additionally, Stephens passed a piece of legislation targeted at reporting waste-prevention in health care (HB 1196 Report Waste-Prevention Methods Accountable Care), as well as another bill assisting home-schooled students in participating in extracurricular activities in public schools (HB 1095 Home School Students Participation in Activities).

=== 2014 U.S. Senate race ===
Stephens organized a campaign for U.S. Senate to run against Mark Udall. On February 26, 2014, while in the process of raising campaign funds and gathering signatures to petition onto the June Republican primary ballot, she announced her intentions to drop out of the race and support Cory Gardner.

== Colorado Health Benefit Exchange Act ==
Noting that the Affordable Care Act had already been passed in Colorado, Stephens and Senate President Pro-tem Betty Boyd co-sponsored bill SB-11-200, the Colorado Health Benefit Exchange Act, dubbed by some critics as “Amycare,” in an attempt to create a free market within the healthcare system. "AmyCare" was not well received by fellow Republicans and Coloradans in general. “The bill allowed individuals and small businesses to band together and negotiate in marketplaces for health care coverage the way large companies do.” “Stephens sponsored the legislation that created the Connect for Health Colorado insurance marketplace, arguing, “The only thing to decide was if we would exercise our state rights or put people in a federally run exchange.” Stephens set up an implementation review committee to provide oversight and hold the exchange accountable to the legislature and to state audit.
