= Thomas Geitner =

German businessman (born 1955)

- Born: March 14, 1955 (age 71); Heidenheim an der Brenz, West Germany
- Education: Technical University of Munich; MBA, INSEAD

Thomas Geitner (born 14 March 1955) is a German businessman.

== Career ==
Geitner is the chairman of Riskmethods, a supply chain risk management company with offices in Boston, Munich, and Wrocław, and a member of the supervisory board at HolidayCheck Group AG since 23 June 2020.

He joined the board of BBC Worldwide, the BBC’s main commercial subsidiary, as a non-executive director in April 2007 to advise on new media developments, investments and international growth.

Previously, he was the CEO at new businesses and innovation of Vodafone, since April 2006, and a board director since May 2000. During the restructuring of Vodafone, he left the company in late 2006. Geitner had joined Vodafone in 2000, as an executive director, establishing and managing global products and services, he was responsible for establishing Vodafone as a global brand, and for the creation and launch of Vodafone live!, in 2002, and the establishment of a global supply chain organisation. In July 2003, Geitner was appointed Vodafone's CTO, where he initiated and led the One Vodafone programme, established a set of shared service organizations, and created the company's leadership position on 3G across Europe.

He was a director of several of the Group's overseas subsidiaries including chairman of the board of Arcor, a member of the board of Vodafone and a member of the management boards of Vodafone Holding GmbH and Vodafone Deutschland GmbH. He was a member of the supervisory board of Singulus from 1997 to 2009.

Prior to Vodafone, Geitner led a number of engineering businesses and later was responsible for telecommunications at RWE Group and a member of the management board. He was CEO of Otelo Communications GmbH and E-Plus, two German telecommunications companies.
