= Calhan Paint Mines Archeological District =

Archaeological site in Colorado, United States

- U.S. National Register of Historic Places
- U.S. Historic district
- Colorado State Register of Historic Properties No. 5EP3258
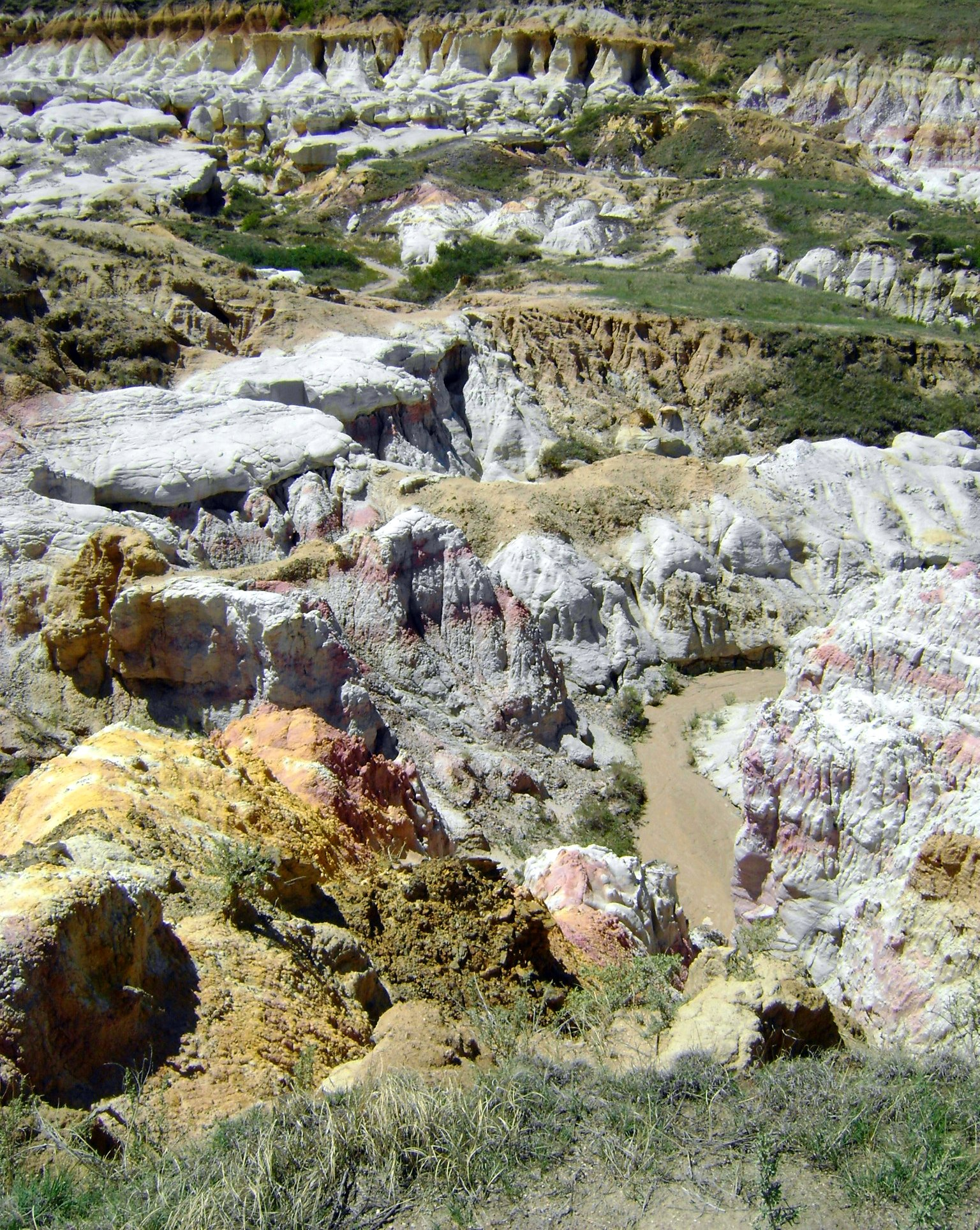

- Location within Colorado Location within the United States
- Location: Calhan, Colorado
- Coordinates: 39°1′18.66″N 104°15′59.57″W
- Area: 750 acres
- NRHP reference No.: 00000783
- CSRHP No.: 5EP3258

Significant dates
- Added to NRHP: July 14, 2000
- Designated CSRHP: 2000

Calhan Paint Mines is an archeological district located on the eastern plains of Colorado in El Paso County, one mile south of Calhan. The Paint Mines Interpretive Park is "a unique blending of geological, archaeological, historical and ecological resources".

== Park ==
The park has a diverse ecological system, with a combination of prairie, badlands and wetlands that attracts coyote, mule deer, song birds, horned toads, falcons, rabbits, and hawks.

The park has 4 miles (6.4 km) of trails that rise over 500 feet (150 m) in elevation. It covers 750 acres (300 ha), containing grassland and geological formations of hoodoos, colored clay and sandstone-capped spires. The site is protected by law because of the fragile environment, as well as the geological and archaeological significance of the artifacts, rocks, animals and plants.

Each year the park is visited by birdwatchers and hikers. It is also an outdoor geological lab.

== Archaeological district ==
Archaeological evidence, such as arrow heads and stone dart tips, has found that there was prehistoric and historic occupation by Native American peoples. The earliest occupation was about 9,000 years ago. Artifacts found represent the Apishapa culture, Cody complex and Duncan complex. The clay was used in prehistoric and historic times to create and paint pottery and as paint for ceremonial purposes. The selenite clay was used for arrowheads. The "channels" were used to herd bison into a gulch where they could be easily hunted with bows and arrows. In the 1800s Euro-American people settled in the park property.

The Calhan Paint Mines Archaeological District was designated by the National Park Service. The land is protected by the El Paso County Parks Department, with funding by the State Historical Fund for master planning and an archaeological survey.

== Gallery ==
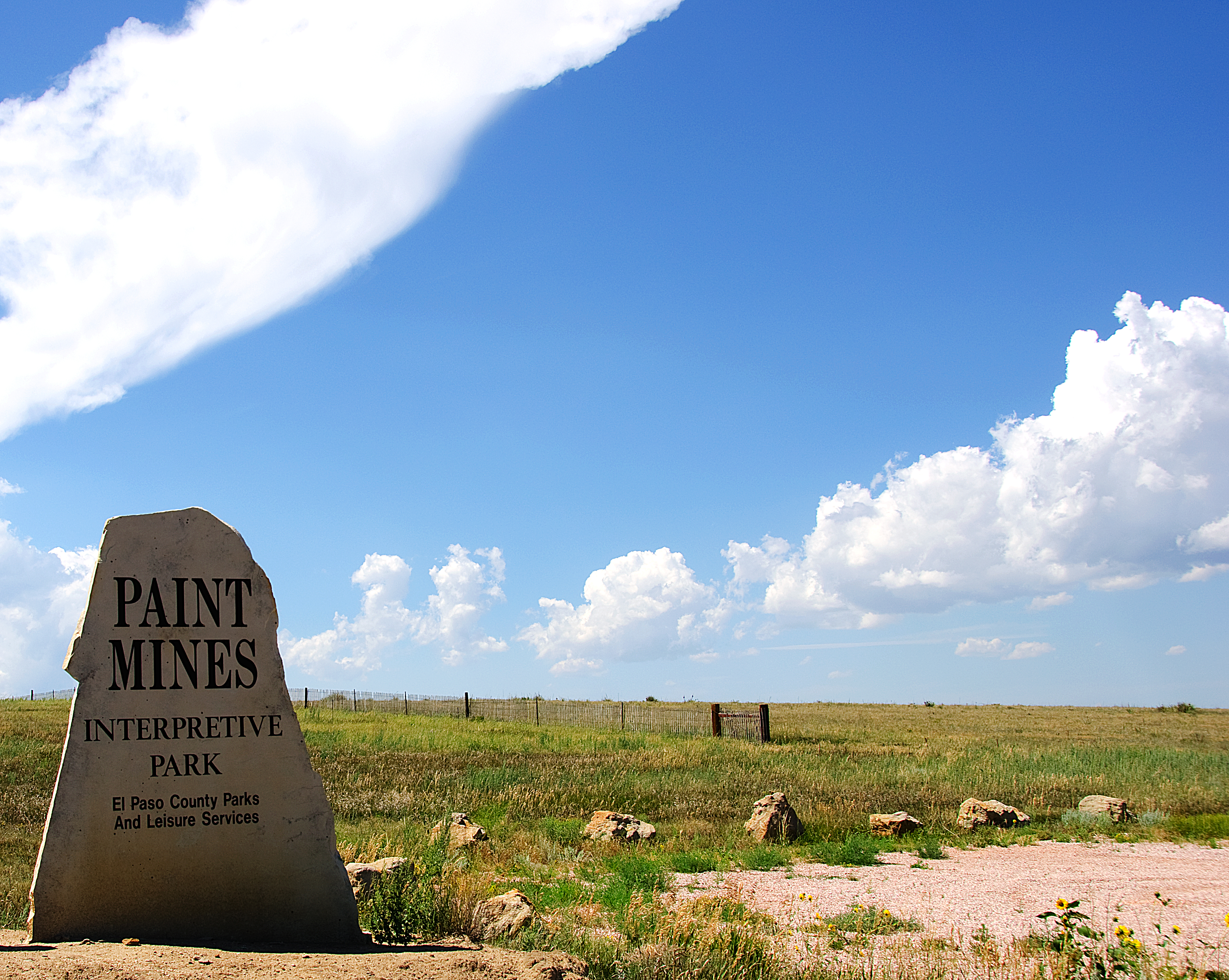

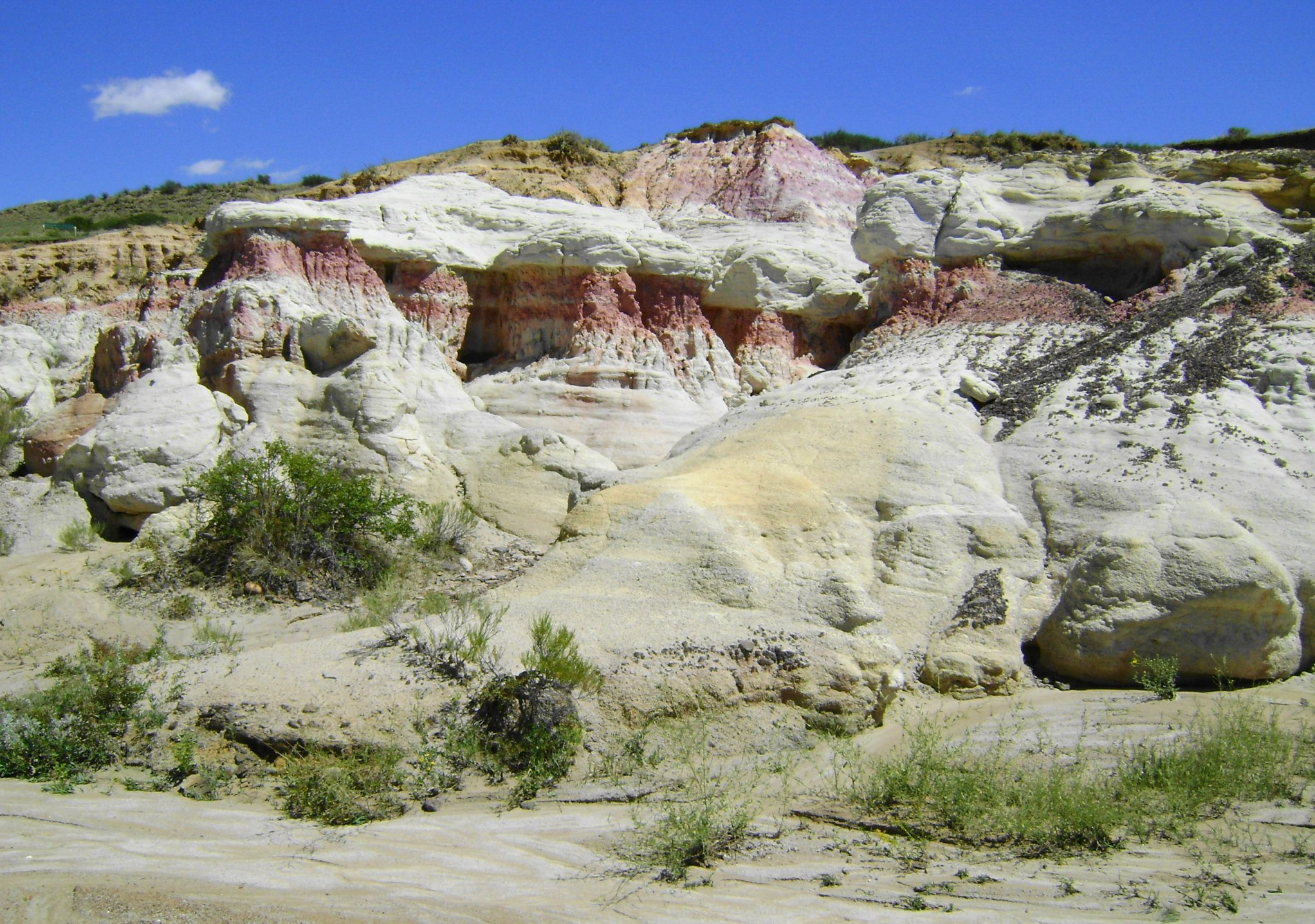

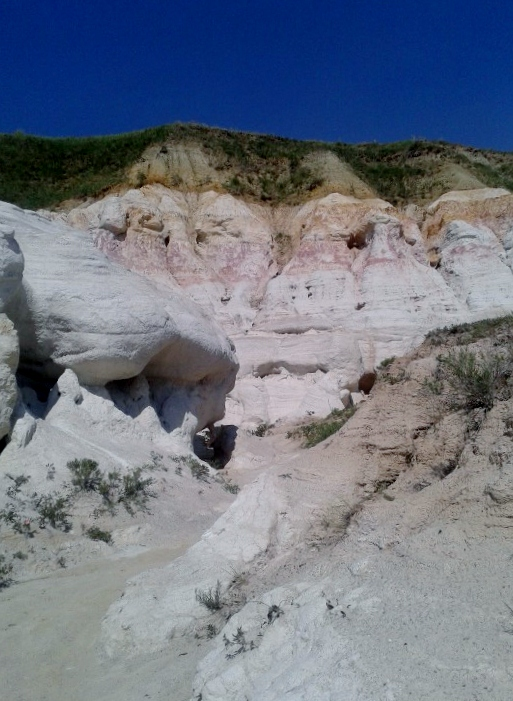

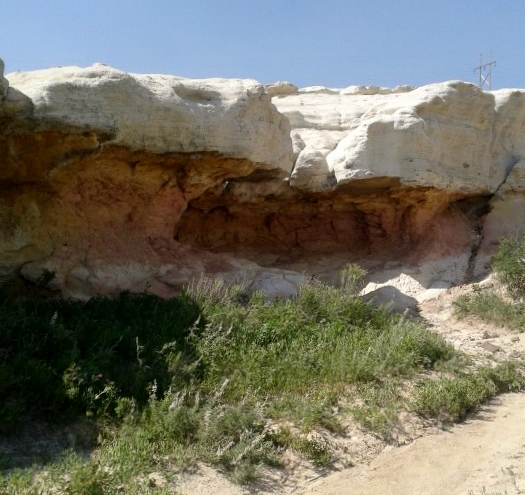

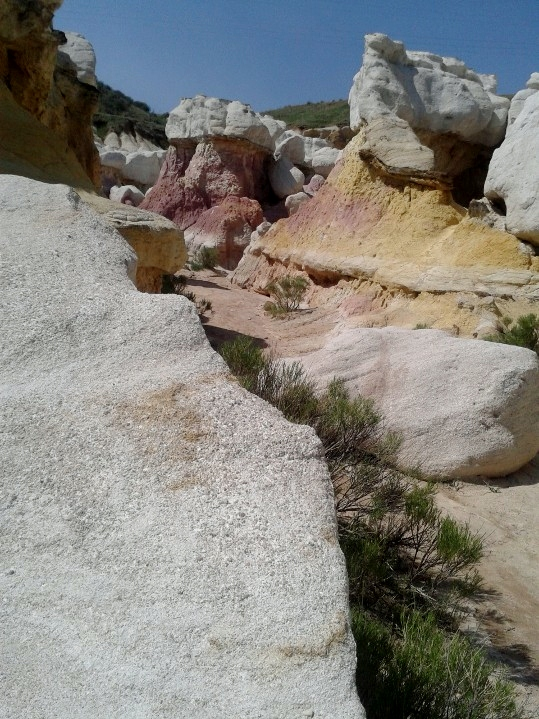

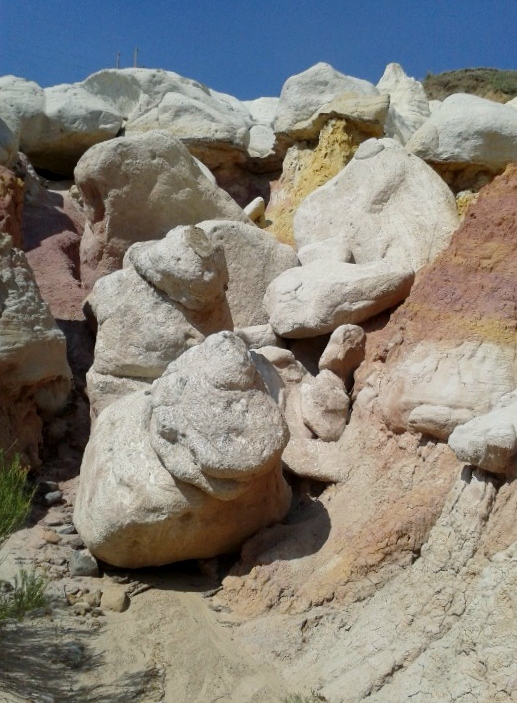

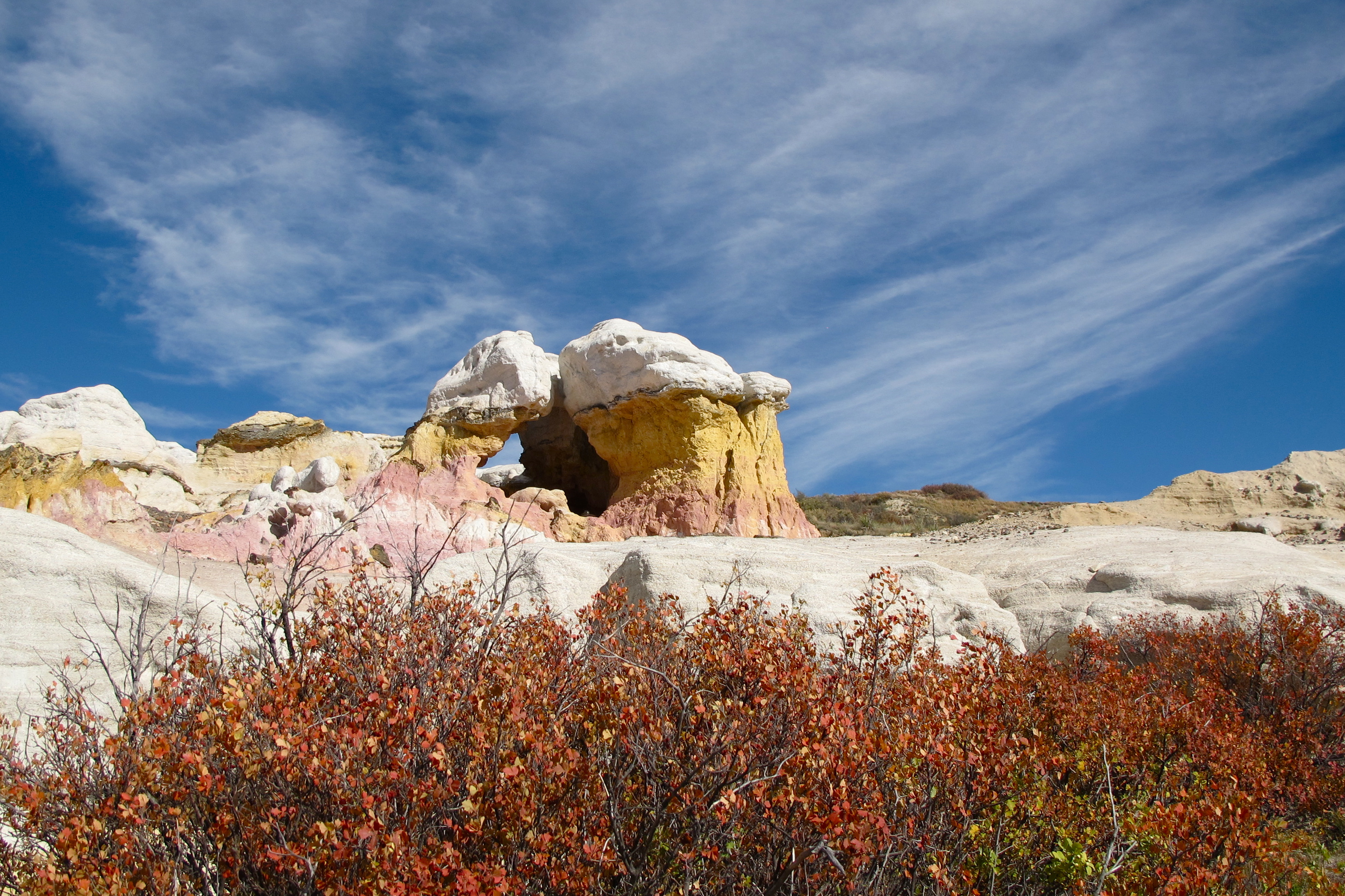

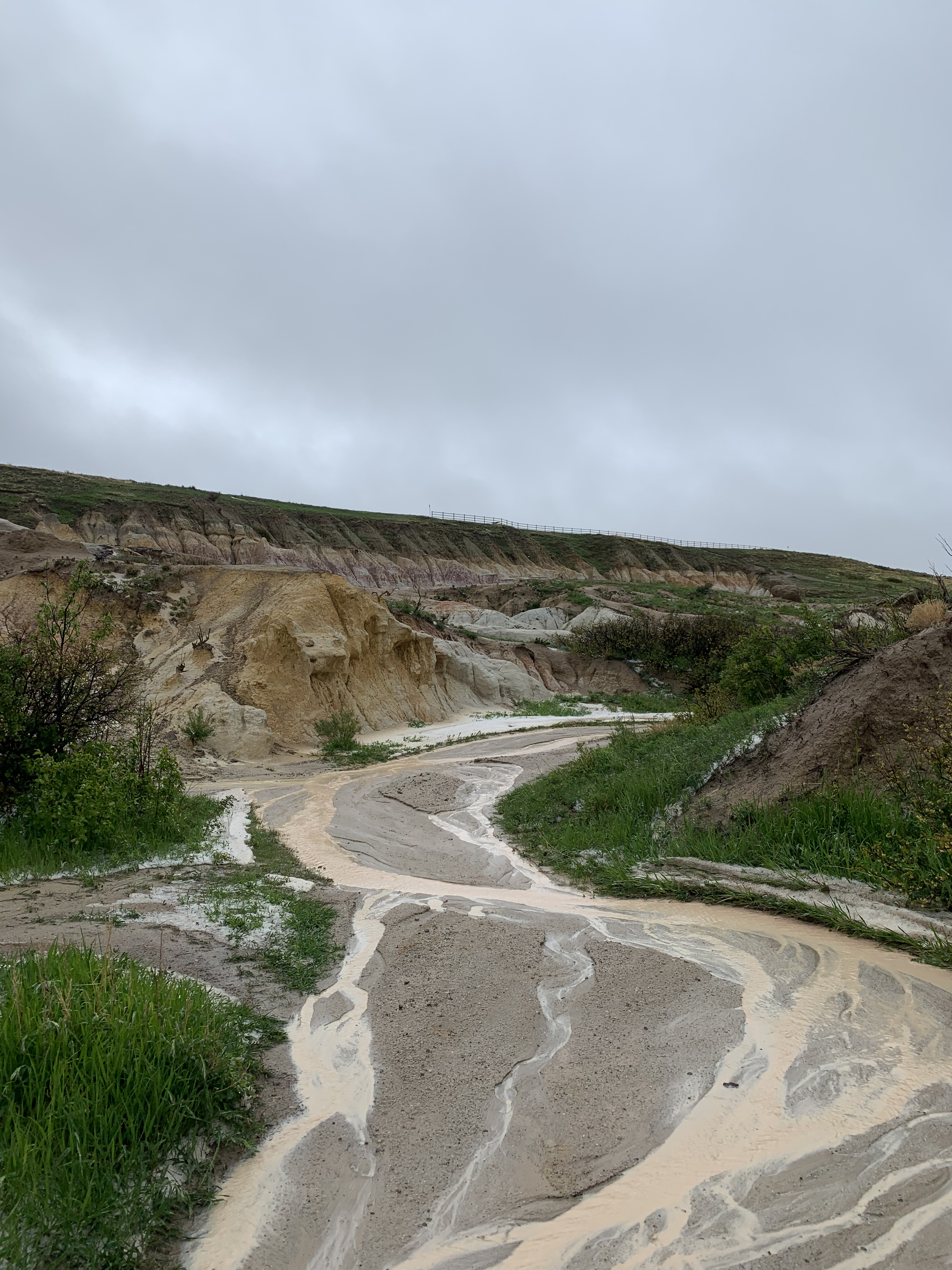
The park after some late spring rains.
