= Dan Woog =

American real estate agent and politician

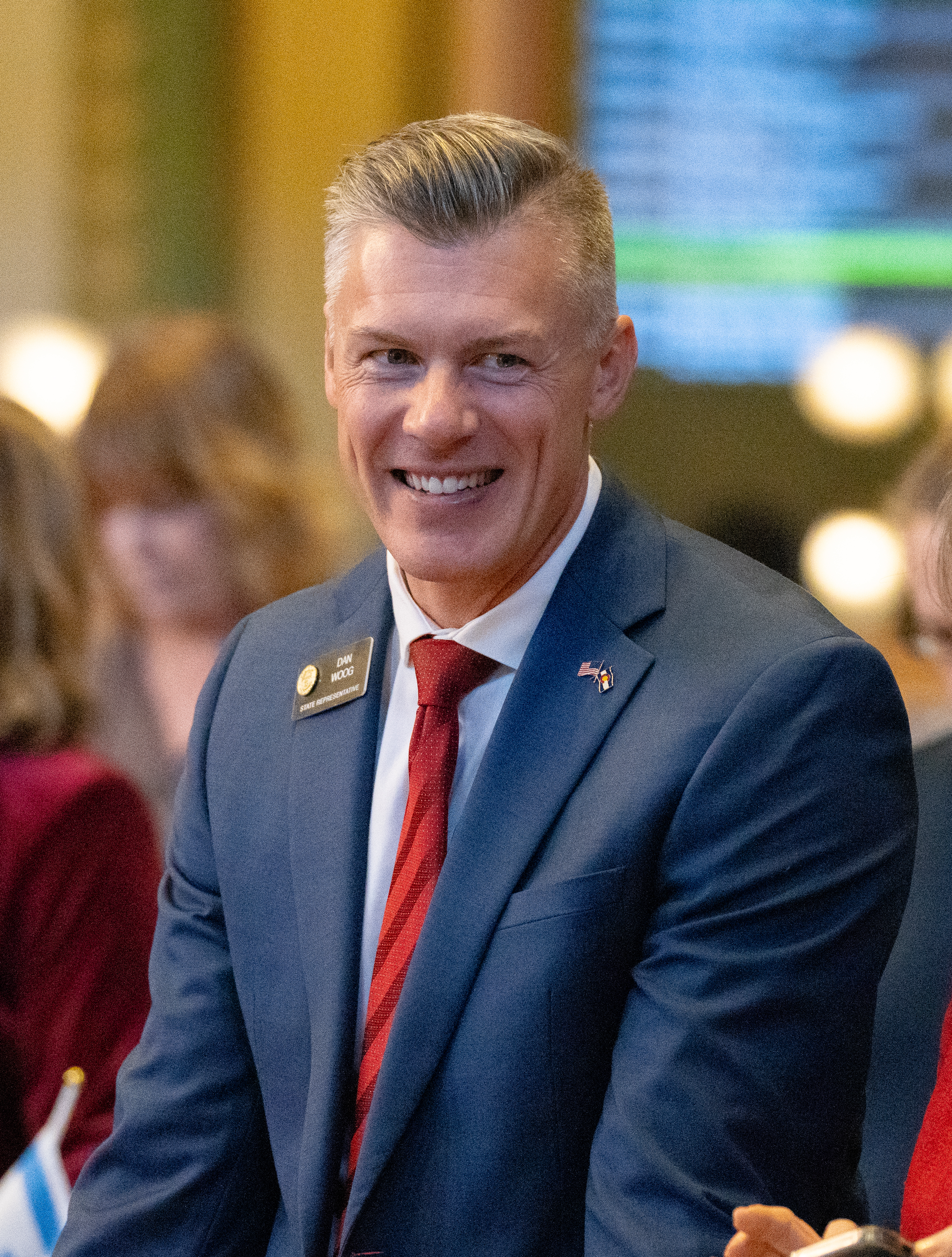
- Woog in 2025

Member of the Colorado House of Representatives from the 19th district
- Incumbent
- Assumed office January 8, 2025
- Preceded by: Jennifer Parenti

Member of the Colorado House of Representatives from the 63rd district
- In office January 13, 2021 – January 9, 2023
- Preceded by: Lori Saine
- Succeeded by: Jennifer Parenti

Personal details
- Party: Republican
- Occupation: Politician & Small Business Owner
- Website: Campaign website

Dan Woog is an American politician from Frederick, Colorado. A Republican, Woog represents Colorado House of Representatives District 19, which includes parts of Weld and Boulder counties in northcentral Colorado, including the municipalities of Erie, Frederick, Firestone, Dacono and a small part of Longmont. From 2021 to 2023, Woog represented House District 63, which included a large part of Weld County in northcentral Colorado.

== Background ==
Woog works as a real estate broker and lives in Frederick, Colorado. Previously, he served on the Erie Economic Development Council and the Erie Planning and Zoning Commission, and he was elected and re-elected to the Erie Board of Trustees. He ran unsuccessfully for mayor of Erie in 2018. After districts were redrawn in 2022, he ran unsuccessfully for Colorado House District 19. Woog earned a bachelor's degree from Arizona State University.

== Elections ==
=== 2020 ===
Woog was first elected to the Colorado House of Representatives in the 2020 general election. In the June 2020 Republican House District 63 primary, he defeated challenger Patricia E. Miller, winning 62.39% of the vote. In the 2020 general election, Woog defeated his Democratic Party and Libertarian Party opponents, winning 59.75% of the total votes cast.

=== 2022 ===
In the 2022 general election, after redistricting, Woog ran in the 19th district but lost to Democrat Jennifer Parenti.

=== 2024 ===
In September 2023, Woog announced his candidacy to once again represent his district in the Colorado House of Representatives in the 2024 elections. In the Republican primary election held June 25, 2024, he ran unopposed. In the general election held November 5, 2024, Woog defeated Democratic candidate Jillaire McMillan by a narrow margin. Given the narrow margin between the two candidates' vote totals, a statutory automatic recount was triggered. The recount confirmed his victory in the race.

2026 - lost.
