= Jennifer Parenti =

American politician

Jennifer Lea Parenti

Member of the Colorado House of Representatives from the 19th district
- In office January 9, 2023 – January 8, 2025
- Preceded by: Dan Woog
- Succeeded by: Dan Woog

Personal details
- Born: Denver, Colorado
- Party: Democratic
- Education: United States Air Force Academy (BS); Naval Postgraduate School (MS); Air University (MA)

Military service
- Branch/service: United States Air Force
- Years of service: 1995–2014
- Rank: Lieutenant Colonel

Jennifer Lea Parenti is an American politician and a former member of the Colorado House of Representatives from the 19th district, which includes portions of Erie, Longmont, Firestone, Dacono, Frederick and other surrounding areas. She was elected in 2022 and assumed office in January 2023.

== Background ==
Parenti was born in Denver, Colorado. From 1995 to 2014 she served as an U.S. Air Force officer, retiring as a Lieutenant Colonel. In 1995, she graduated with a bachelor's degree from the U.S. Air Force Academy and received her graduate degree from the Naval Postgraduate School. Among the highlights of her Air Force service were serving as a ROTC instructor at the University of Massachusetts, an Air Force international affairs specialist, and as a military attache at the US Embassy in Paris. After retirement, she worked for NATO before returning to Colorado.

== Political career ==
In the 2022 general election, Parenti defeated the incumbent Republican representative, Dan Woog, after redistricting. Her legislative priorities included housing, transportation, veteran issues and advocating for civil liberties.

On July 19, 2024, Parenti abandoned her re-election bid after winning the Democratic primary for her district the prior month. Reports quoted Parenti as stating, "I cannot continue to serve while maintaining my own sense of integrity." She placed the blame on special interests and personal agendas for making it too difficult for her to continue to serve in the State House. She will serve out what remains of her term. A Democratic vacancy committee will name a replacement.

=== Tenure ===
In the State House, Parenti was a member of the Joint Technology, Transportation, Housing & Local Government and Agriculture, Water & Natural Resources committees.

== Personal life ==
Parenti is an Air Force veteran. She has two children.
