= Colorado's 19th House of Representatives district =

American legislative district

Colorado's 19th State House of Representatives district
Representative
Dan Woog; R–Frederick
- Demographics: 71% White; 0% Black; 18% Hispanic; 4% Asian; 0% Native American; 5% Multiracial
- Population (2021): 98,539

Colorado's 19th House of Representatives district is one of 65 districts in the Colorado House of Representatives. It has been represented by Dan Woog since 2024.

== Geography ==
District 19 is based in northcentral Colorado and contains parts of Weld and Boulder counties.

== Members ==
- Richard Decker (until 2007)
- Marsha Looper (2007–2013)
- Amy Stephens (2013–2015)
- Paul Lundeen (2015–2019)
- Tim Geitner (2019–2022)
- Jennifer Parenti (2023–2025)
- Dan Woog (since 2025)
