= Colorado's 9th Senate district =

American legislative district

Colorado's 9th State Senate district
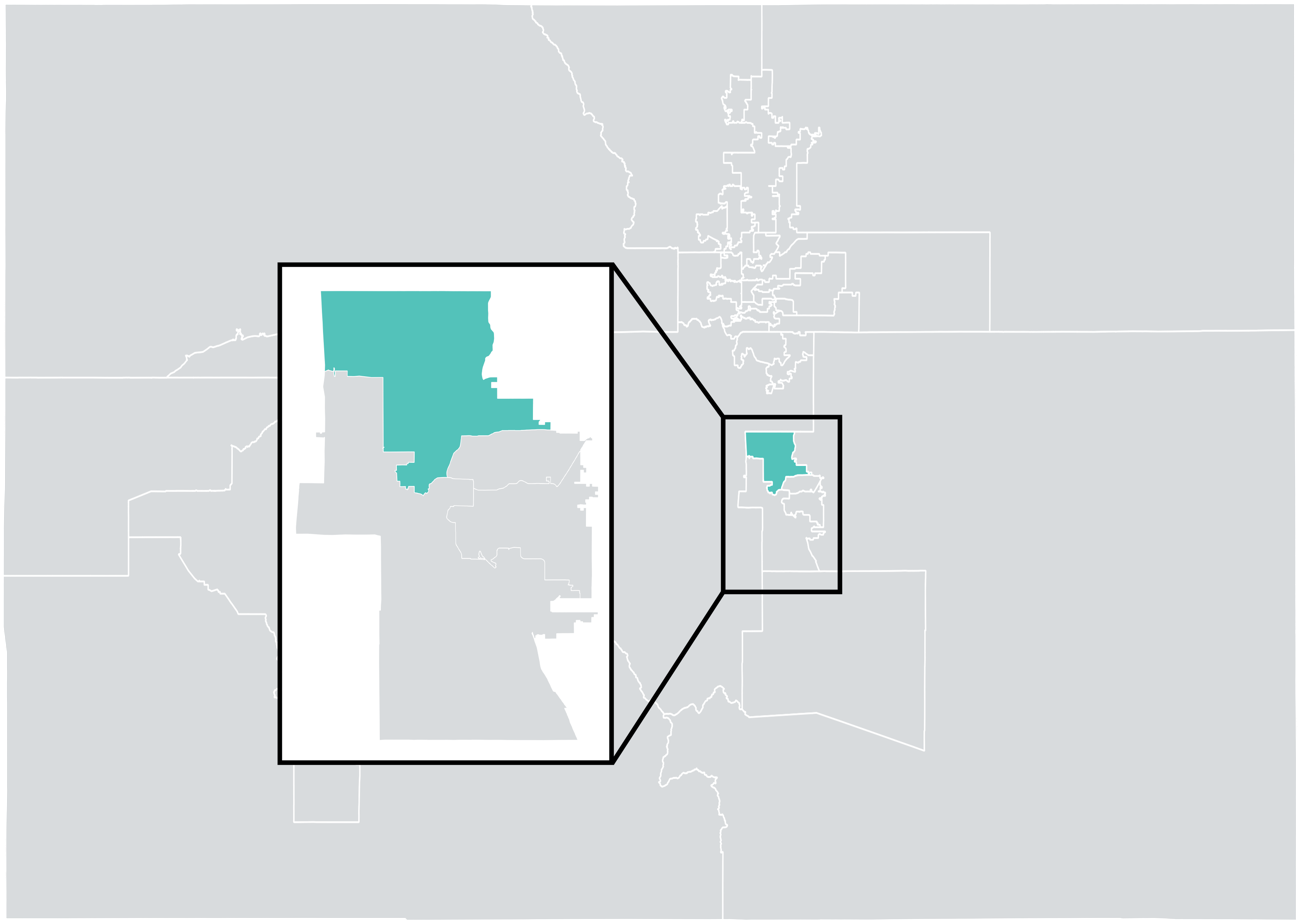
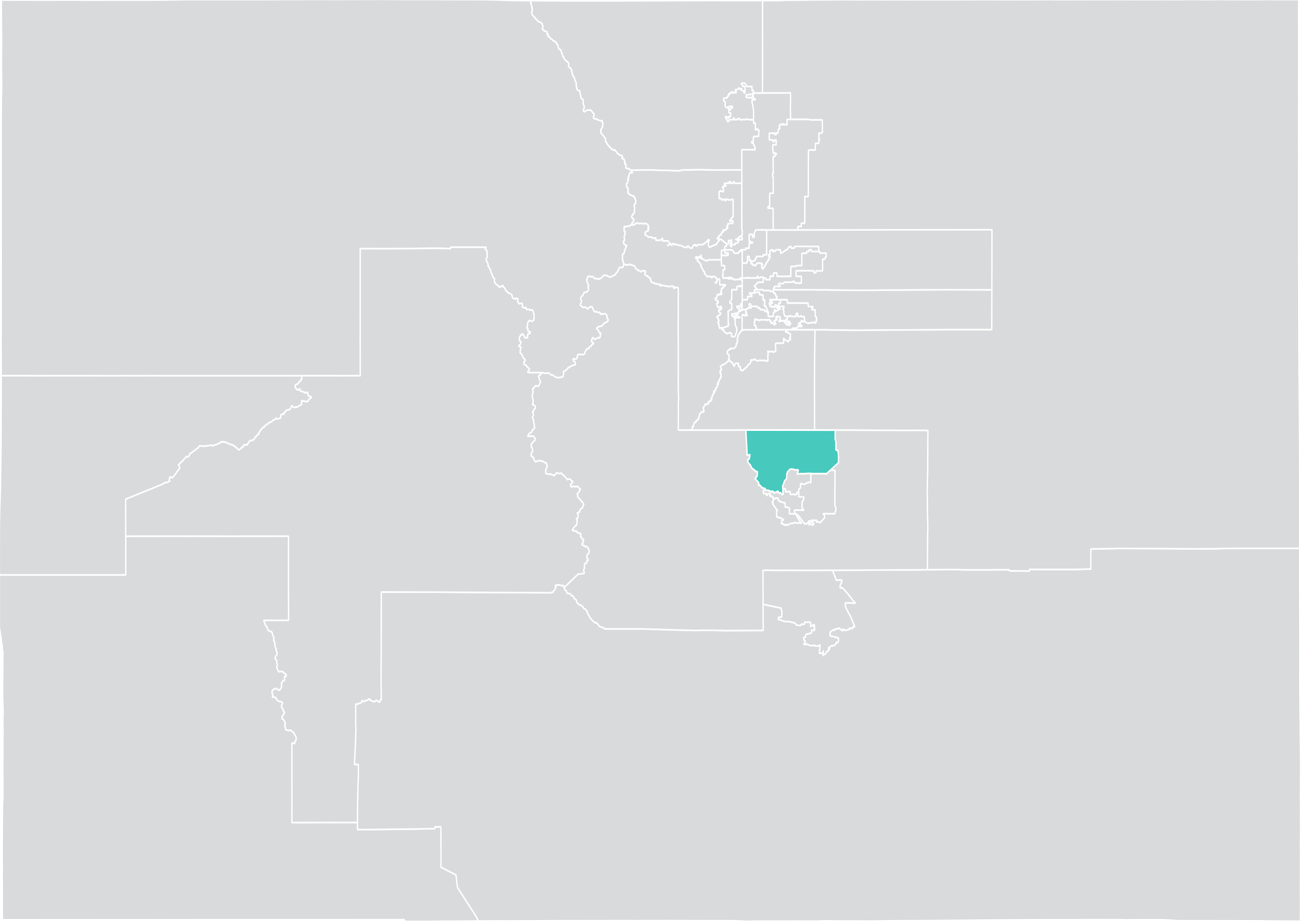
Senator
Lynda Zamora Wilson; R–Air Force Academy
- Registration: 34.3% Republican; 14.1% Democratic; 49.6% No party preference
- Demographics: 81% White; 3% Black; 10% Hispanic; 3% Asian; 3% Other
- Population (2018): 164,800
- Registered voters: 138,308

Colorado's 9th Senate district is one of 35 districts in the Colorado Senate. It is currently represented by Lynda Zamora Wilson, who was selected by vacancy committee following the resignation Paul Lundeen, who reprsentated the district from 2019 until his resignation in June 2025.

== Geography ==
District 9 covers the northern suburbs of Colorado Springs in El Paso County, including the communities of Monument, Palmer Lake, Black Forest, Gleneagle, Woodmoor, and parts of Falcon and Colorado Springs proper. The district is also home to the United States Air Force Academy.

The district is located entirely within Colorado's 5th congressional district, and overlaps with the 14th, 15th, 18th, 19th, and 20th districts of the Colorado House of Representatives.

== Recent election results ==
=== 2022 ===
Colorado state senators are elected to staggered four-year terms; under normal circumstances, the 9th district holds elections in midterm years. The 2022 election will be the first held under the state's new district lines.

2022 Colorado State Senate election, District 9
Primary election
Party	Candidate	Votes	%
Republican	Paul Lundeen (incumbent)	20,470	66.4
Republican	Lynda Zamora Wilson	10,378	33.6
Total votes		30,848	100
General election
Republican	Paul Lundeen (incumbent)	50,266	62.3
Democratic	Arik Dougherty	28,327	35.1
Libertarian	Stephen Darnell	2,075	2.6
Total votes		80,668	100

== Historical election results ==
=== 2018 ===
2018 Colorado State Senate election, District 9
Party	Candidate	Votes	%
Republican	Paul Lundeen	61,341	70.3
Democratic	Gil Armendariz	25,892	29.7
Total votes		87,233	100
Republican hold			

=== 2014 ===
2014 Colorado State Senate election, District 9
Party	Candidate	Votes	%
Republican	Kent Lambert (incumbent)	53,867	100
Total votes		53,867	100
Republican hold			

=== Federal and statewide results ===
Year	Office	Results
2020	President	Trump 60.2 – 36.6%
2018	Governor	Stapleton 64.8 – 32.0%
2016	President	Trump 62.8 – 27.8%
2014	Senate	Gardner 70.6 – 25.4%
2014	Governor	Beauprez 68.8 – 27.8%
2012	President	Romney 69.7 – 28.3%
