= Calhan, Colorado =

Town in Colorado, US

- Statutory town
- Town of Calhan
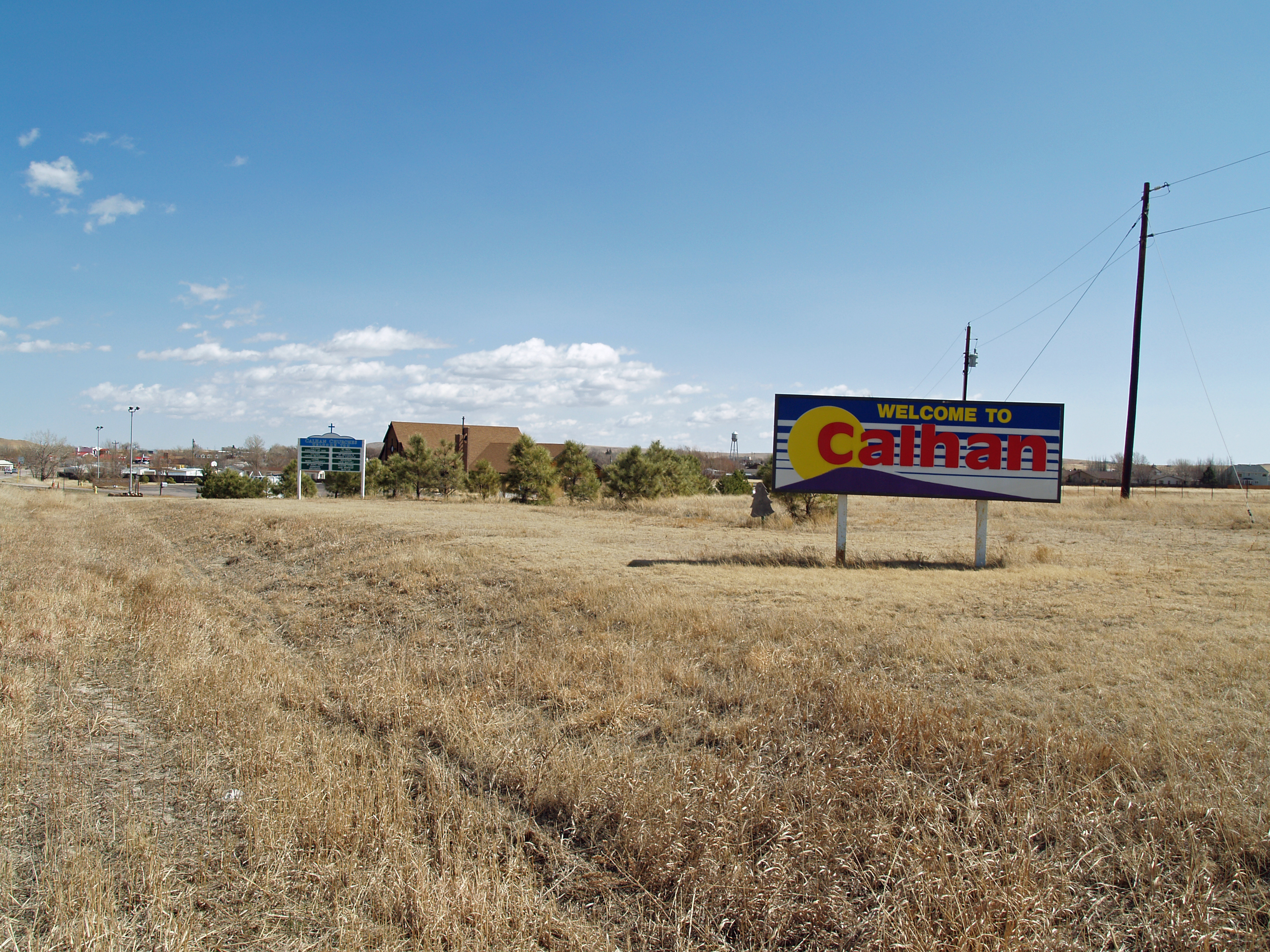
- Motto: "Highest Incorporated Non-Mountain Town in the U.S."
- Location of the Town of Calhan in El Paso County, Colorado

- Location of the Town of Calhan, Colorado. Calhan (Colorado)
- Coordinates: 39°02′04″N 104°17′58″W
- Country: United States
- State: Colorado
- County: El Paso
- Incorporated: May 10, 1919

Government
  - Type: Statutory town

Area
  - Total: 0.828 sq mi (2.144 km^{2})
  - Land: 0.828 sq mi (2.144 km^{2})
  - Water: 0 sq mi (0.000 km^{2})
- Elevation: 6,536 ft (1,992 m)

Population (2020)
  - Total: 762
  - Density: 921/sq mi (356/km^{2})
- Time zone: UTC−07:00 (MST)
  - Summer (DST): UTC−06:00 (MDT)
- ZIP code: 80808
- Area code: 719
- GNIS town ID: 2413149
- FIPS code: 08 11260
- Major Highways: link = U.S. Route 24 in Colorado
- Website: www.calhan.co

The Town of Calhan is a statutory town located in El Paso County, Colorado, United States. The town population was 762 at the 2020 United States census. Calhan is a part of the Colorado Springs, CO Metropolitan Statistical Area and the Front Range Urban Corridor. The town straddles U.S. Highway 24. With Calhan sitting at an elevation of 6,535 feet (1,992 meters) above sea level, Calhan is the highest non-mountain town in the United States.

== History ==
Calhan was established in 1888 as a water station for the now-defunct Chicago, Rock Island and Pacific Railroad, with the first steam locomotive arriving on November 5, 1888. The town was named by and for Michael Calahan, who had the contract to lay railroad tracks from the Colorado/Kansas border to Colorado Springs. However, when the town's first U.S. Post Office opened on November 24, 1888, the middle "a" had been dropped and the town was registered as "Calhan." The town was incorporated as a statutory town in 1919. The town grew quickly, but it was not until 1906 that the Calhan Rock Island Railroad Depot was built to meet the growing needs of the area.

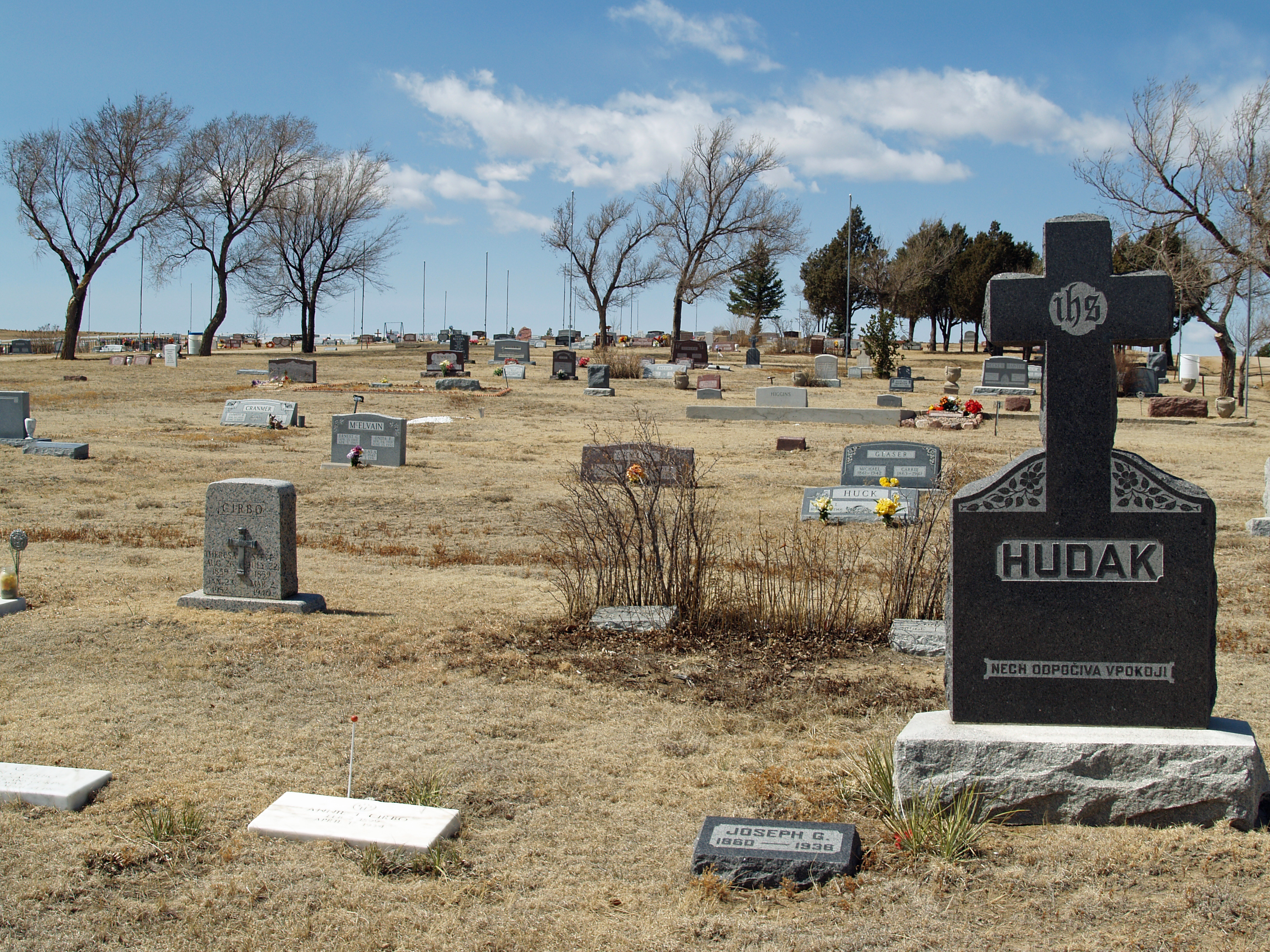
The Calhan cemetery

Jesse N. Funk was a rancher in Calhan when the United States joined the First World War in 1917. Having enlisted in 1915, Private Funk was sent to France to support the Allied efforts at the Battle of Saint-Mihiel. There on October 31, 1918, Funk rescued two wounded officers from no man's land while under machine gun fire, for which Funk received the Medal of Honor.

In 1993, the Orthodox Church in America established the Protection of the Holy Virgin community, a female monastic community. Until they moved further west to Lake George in 1995, the monastics rented a home in Calhan.

== Geography ==
At the 2020 United States census, the town had a total area of 530 acres (2.144 km^{2}), all of it land.

=== Climate ===
Calhan has a cold semi-arid climate, characterised by the low levels of rainfall and the cold temperatures.

Climate data for Calhan, Colorado
| Month | Jan | Feb | Mar | Apr | May | Jun | Jul | Aug | Sep | Oct | Nov | Dec | Year |
|---|---|---|---|---|---|---|---|---|---|---|---|---|---|
| Mean daily maximum °F (°C) | 43 (6) | 45 (7) | 52 (11) | 60 (16) | 69 (21) | 79 (26) | 86 (30) | 82 (28) | 75 (24) | 63 (17) | 51 (11) | 42 (6) | 62 (17) |
| Mean daily minimum °F (°C) | 15 (−9) | 18 (−8) | 25 (−4) | 32 (0) | 42 (6) | 50 (10) | 56 (13) | 55 (13) | 45 (7) | 34 (1) | 23 (−5) | 16 (−9) | 34 (1) |
| Average precipitation inches (mm) | 0.23 (5.8) | 0.27 (6.9) | 0.77 (20) | 1.48 (38) | 2.20 (56) | 2.28 (58) | 2.61 (66) | 2.68 (68) | 0.97 (25) | 0.78 (20) | 0.42 (11) | 0.27 (6.9) | 14.96 (381.6) |
Source: The Weather Channel

== Demographics ==
Historical population
| Census | Pop. | Note | %± |
|---|---|---|---|
| 1930 | 399 | | — |
| 1940 | 352 | | −11.8% |
| 1950 | 375 | | 6.5% |
| 1960 | 347 | | −7.5% |
| 1970 | 465 | | 34.0% |
| 1980 | 541 | | 16.3% |
| 1990 | 562 | | 3.9% |
| 2000 | 896 | | 59.4% |
| 2010 | 780 | | −12.9% |
| 2020 | 762 | | −2.3% |
U.S. Decennial Census

As of the census of 2000, there were 896 people, 347 households, and 246 families residing in the town. The population density was 1,204.1 inhabitants per square mile (464.9/km^{2}). There were 376 housing units at an average density of 505.3 units per square mile (195.1 units/km^{2}). The racial makeup of the town was 96.99% White, 0.22% Native American, 0.67% Asian, 0.22% from other races, and 1.90% from two or more races. Hispanic or Latino of any race were 1.90% of the population.

There were 347 households, out of which 39.5% had children under the age of 18 living with them, 57.3% were married couples living together, 10.1% had a female householder with no husband present, and 29.1% were non-families. 25.4% of all households were made up of individuals, and 14.4% had someone living alone who was 65 years of age or older. The average household size was 2.58 and the average family size was 3.11.

In the town, the population was spread out, with 29.7% under the age of 18, 7.4% from 18 to 24, 28.1% from 25 to 44, 20.3% from 45 to 64, and 14.5% who were 65 years of age or older. The median age was 36 years. For every 100 females, there were 86.7 males. For every 100 females age 18 and over, there were 84.8 males.

The median income for a household in the town was $35,735, and the median income for a family was $50,000. Males had a median income of $32,135 versus $24,659 for females. The per capita income for the town was $19,266. About 3.7% of families and 8.2% of the population were below the poverty line, including 5.4% of those under age 18 and 12.0% of those age 65 or over.

== Notable people ==
- Jesse N. Funk, Medal of Honor, World War I
- Trista Vick-Majors, Antarctic researcher

== Education ==
Students are served by Calhan School District RJ-1.

== Attractions ==
- Calhan Rock Island Railroad Depot
- Calhan Paint Mines Archeological District
- The El Paso County Fair
- Calhan Summer Fest, held the Friday before the El Paso County Fair opens
- The annual Homecoming Parade, held in late September/early October
- Annual Christmas Parade of Lights held in December
- El Paso County Speedway

== Transportation ==
U.S. Highway 24 runs directly through town. Calhan is served by U.S. 24 as it heads to Limon from Colorado Springs.

== See also ==
- Colorado Springs, CO Metropolitan Statistical Area
