= Hobby =

Regular activity done for enjoyment

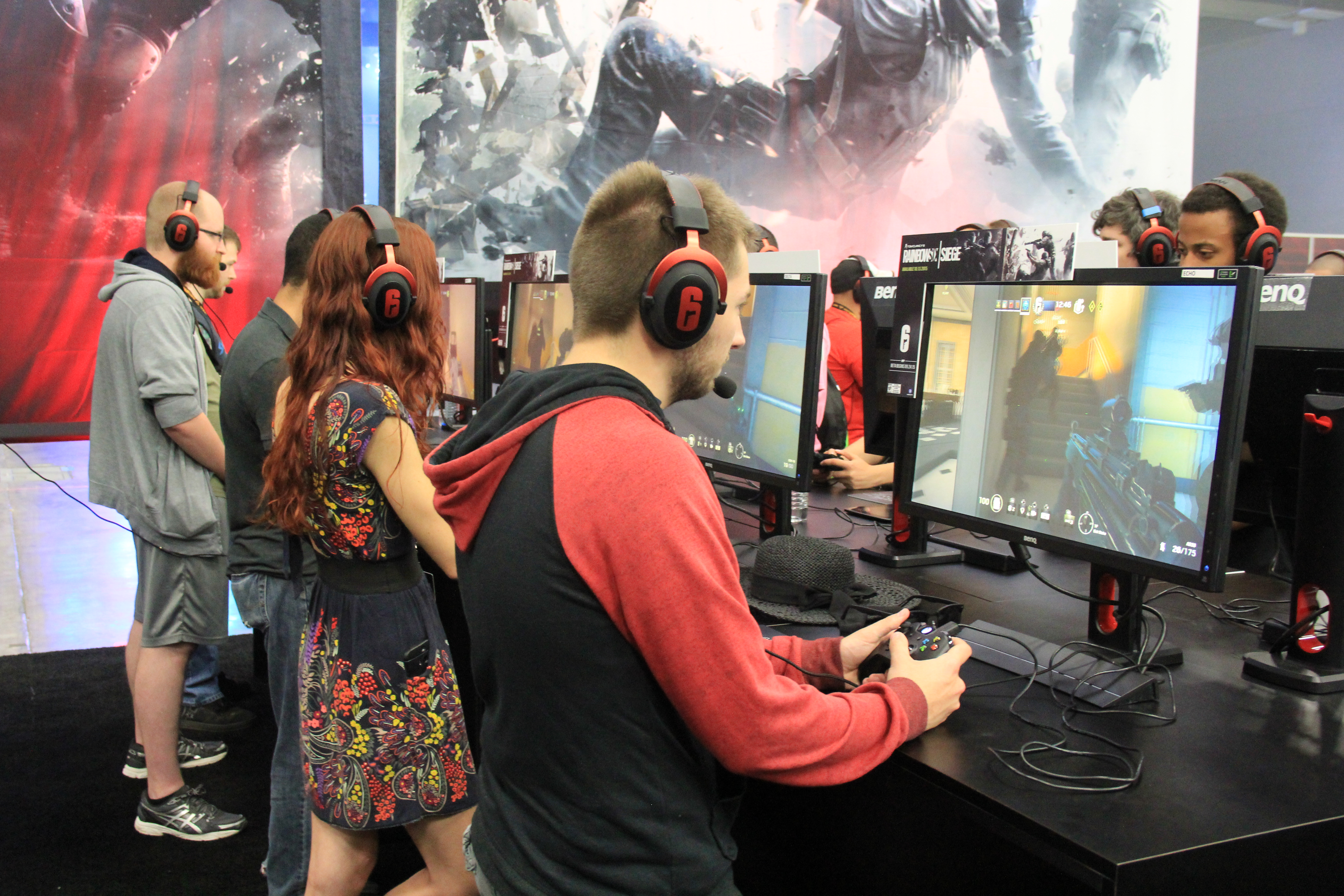
People partaking in various hobbies, such as painting, gaming, skateboarding and stamp collecting.

A hobby is a regular activity that is done for enjoyment, typically during one's leisure time. Hobbies include collecting themed items and objects, engaging in creative and artistic pursuits, playing sports, or pursuing other amusements or avocations. Participation in hobbies encourages acquiring substantial skills and knowledge in that area. A list of hobbies changes with renewed interests and developing fashions, making it diverse and lengthy. Hobbies tend to follow trends in society. For example, stamp collecting was popular during the nineteenth and twentieth centuries as postal systems were the main means of communication; in more recent years, video games have become more popular following technological advances. The advancing production, technology, and labour movements of the nineteenth century provided workers with more leisure time to engage in hobbies. Because of this, the efforts of people investing in hobbies have increased with time.

There are various types of hobbies, which can be classified in various ways, including subject matter, degree of time commitment, and social versus solitary nature. The Serious Leisure Perspective of Robert Stebbins identifies hobbies under three sub-categories: casual leisure, which is intrinsically rewarding, short-lived, pleasurable activity requiring little or no preparation; serious leisure, which is the systematic pursuit of an amateur, hobbyist, or volunteer that is substantial, rewarding and results in a sense of accomplishment; and finally project-based leisure, which is a short-term, often one-off, project that is rewarding.

== Etymology ==
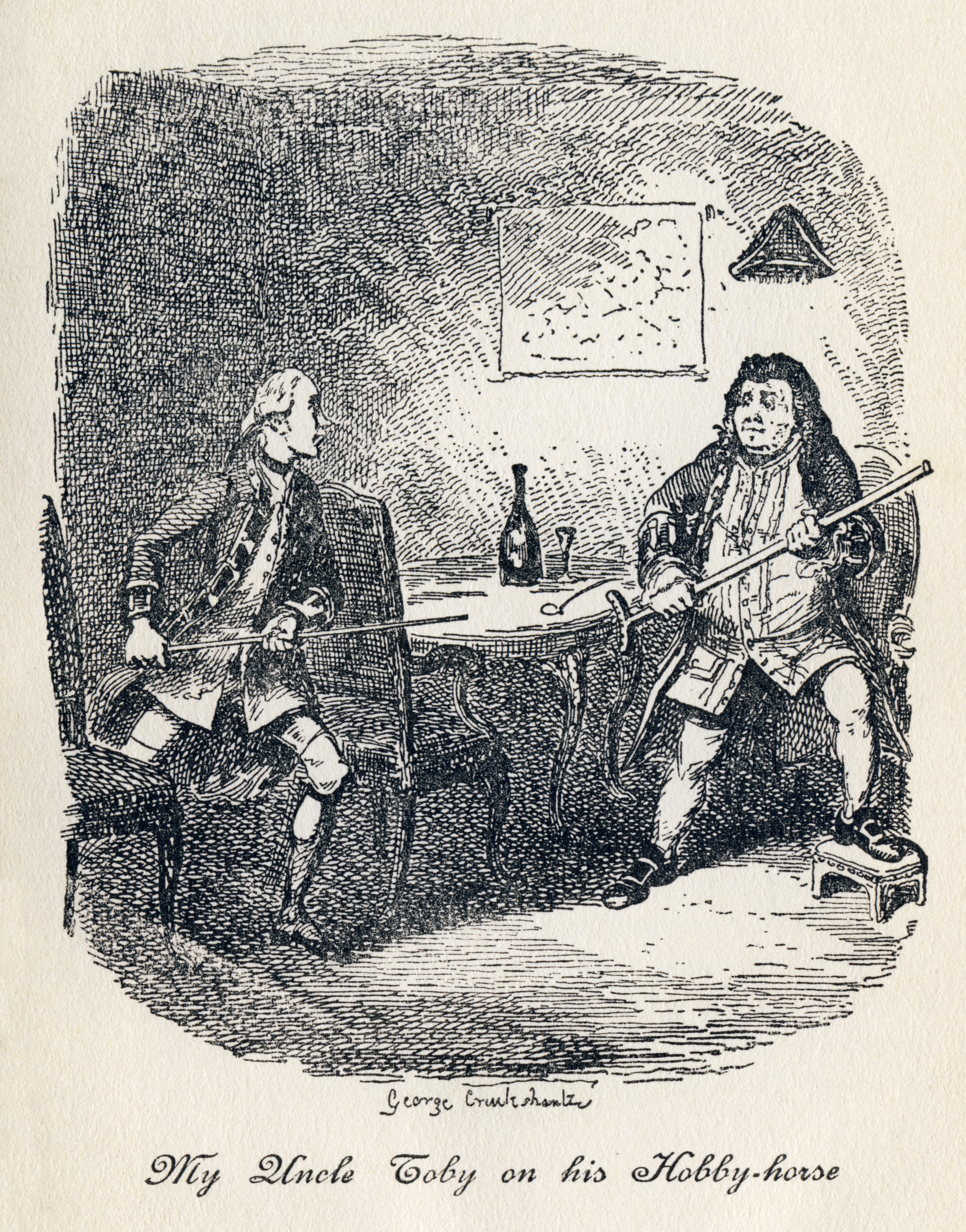
In Tristram Shandy, the term "hobby-horse" was used to refer to whimsical obsessions, which led to the current use of the word "hobby".

In the 16th century, the term "hobby" had the meaning of "small horse and pony". The term "hobby horse" was documented in a 1557 payment confirmation for a "Hobbyhorse" from Reading, England. The item, originally called a "Tourney Horse", was made of a wooden or basketwork frame with an artificial tail and head. It was designed for a child to mimic riding a real horse. By 1816 the derivative, "hobby", was introduced into the vocabulary of a number of English people. Over the course of subsequent centuries, the term came to be associated with recreation and leisure. In the 17th century, the term was used in a pejorative sense by suggesting that a hobby was a childish pursuit, however, in the 18th century with more industrial society and more leisure time, hobbies took on greater respectability. A hobby is also called a pastime, derived from the use of hobbies to pass the time. A hobby became an activity that is practiced regularly and usually with some worthwhile purpose. Hobbies are usually, but not always, practiced primarily for interest and enjoyment, rather than financial reward.

== History ==
Prior to the mid-19th century, hobbies were generally considered as an obsession, childish or trivial, with negative connotations. However, as early as 1676 Sir Matthew Hale, in Contemplations Moral and Divine, wrote "Almost every person hath some hobby horse or other wherein he prides himself." He was acknowledging that a "hobby horse" produces a legitimate sense of pride. The cultural shift towards acceptance of hobbies was thought to begin during the mid 18th century as working people had more regular hours of work and greater leisure time, spending more time to pursue interests that brought them satisfaction. However, there was concern that these working people might not use their leisure time in worthwhile pursuits. "The hope of weaning people away from bad habits by the provision of counter-attractions came to the fore in the 1830s, and has rarely waned since. Initially, the bad habits were perceived to be of a sensual and physical nature, and the counter attractions, or perhaps more accurately alternatives, deliberately cultivated rationality and the intellect." The book and magazine trade of the day encouraged worthwhile hobbies and pursuits. The burgeoning manufacturing trade made materials used in hobbies cheap and was responsive to the changing interests of hobbyists.

In 1941, George Orwell identified hobbies as central to English culture at the time: "Another English characteristic which is so much a part of us that we barely notice it … is the addiction to hobbies and spare-time occupations, the privateness of English life. We are a nation of flower-lovers, but also a nation of stamp-collectors, pigeon-fanciers, amateur carpenters, coupon-snippers, darts-players, crossword-puzzle fans. All the culture that is most truly native centers round things which even when they are communal are not official—the pub, the football match, the back garden, the fireside and the 'nice cup of tea'."

Deciding what to include in a list of hobbies provokes debate because it is difficult to decide which pleasurable pass-times can also be described as hobbies. During the 20th century the term hobby suggested activities, such as stamp collecting, embroidery, knitting, painting, woodwork, and photography. Typically the description did not include activities like listening to music, watching television, or reading. These latter activities bring pleasure, but lack the sense of achievement usually associated with a hobby. They are usually not structured, organized pursuits, as most hobbies are. The pleasure of a hobby is usually associated with making something of value or achieving something of value. "Such leisure is socially valorized precisely because it produces feelings of satisfaction with something that looks very much like work but that is done of its own sake." "Hobbies are a contradiction: they take work and turn it into leisure, and take leisure and turn it into work." A 2018 study using survey results identified the term "hobby" to most accurately describe activities associated with making or collecting objects, especially when done alone.

Cultural trends related to hobbies change with time. In the 21st century, the video game industry has been popular as a hobby involving millions of children and adults. Stamp collecting declined along with the importance of the postal system. Woodwork and knitting declined as hobbies, because manufactured goods provide cheap alternatives for handmade goods. Through the internet, an online community has become a hobby for many people; sharing advice, information and support, and in some cases, allowing a traditional hobby, such as collecting, to flourish and support trading in a new environment.

== Hobbyists ==
Hobbyists are a part of a wider group of people engaged in leisure pursuits where the boundaries of each group overlap to some extent. The Serious Leisure Perspective groups hobbyists with amateurs and volunteers and identifies three broad groups of leisure activity with hobbies being found mainly in the Serious leisure category. Casual leisure is intrinsically rewarding, short-lived, pleasurable activity requiring little or no preparation. Serious leisure is the systematic pursuit of an amateur, hobbyist, or volunteer that is substantial, rewarding and results in a sense of accomplishment. Finally, project-based leisure is a short-term often a one-off project that is rewarding.

The terms amateur and hobbyist are often used interchangeably. Stebbins has a framework which distinguishes the terms in a useful categorization of leisure in which casual leisure is separated from serious Leisure. He describes serious leisure as undertaken by amateurs, hobbyists and volunteers. Amateurs engage in pursuits that have a professional counterpart, such as playing an instrument or astronomy. Hobbyists engage in five broad types of activity: collecting, making and tinkering (like embroidery and car restoration), activity participation (like fishing and singing), sports and games, and liberal-arts hobbies (like languages, cuisine, literature). Volunteers commit to organizations where they work as guides, counsellors, gardeners and so on. The separation of the amateur from the hobbyist is because the amateur has the ethos of the professional practitioner as a guide to practice. An amateur clarinetist is conscious of the role and procedures of a professional clarinetist.

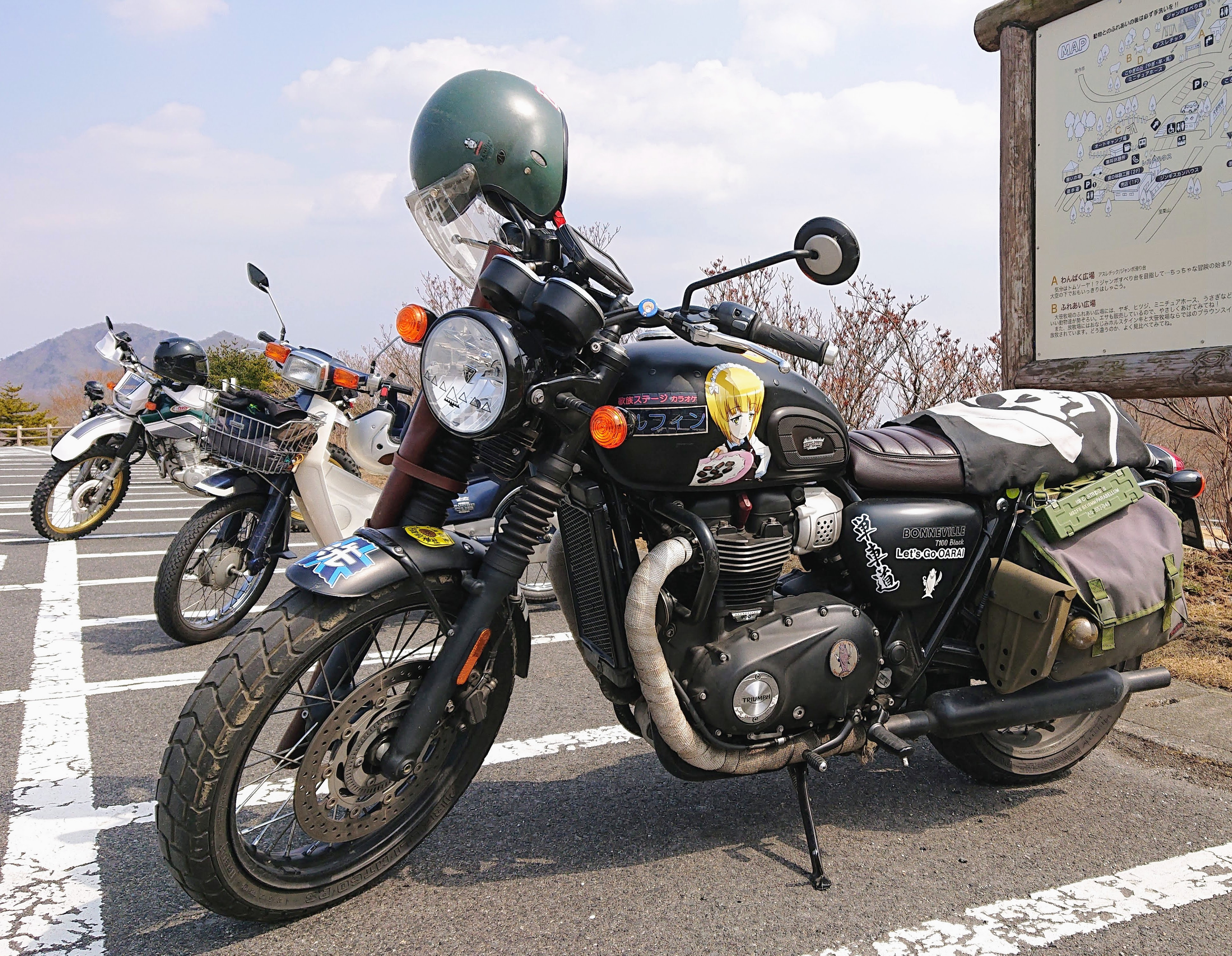
There are people who enjoy motorcycle touring alone or in groups, and there are also club teams.

A large proportion of hobbies are mainly solitary in nature. However, individual pursuit of a hobby often includes club memberships, organized sharing of products and regular communication between participants. For many hobbies there is an important role in being in touch with fellow hobbyists. Some hobbies are of communal nature, like choral singing and volunteering.

People who engage in hobbies have an interest in and time to pursue them. Children have been an important group of hobbyists because they are enthusiastic for collecting, making and exploring, in addition to this they have the leisure time that allows them to pursue those hobbies. The growth in hobbies occurred during industrialization which gave workers set time for leisure. During the Depression there was an increase in the participation in hobbies because the unemployed had the time and a desire to be purposefully occupied. Hobbies are often pursued with an increased interest by retired people because they have the time and seek the intellectual and physical stimulation a hobby provides.

== Types of hobbies ==
Hobbies are a diverse set of activities and it is difficult to categorize them in a logical manner. The following categorization of hobbies was developed by Stebbins.

=== Collecting ===
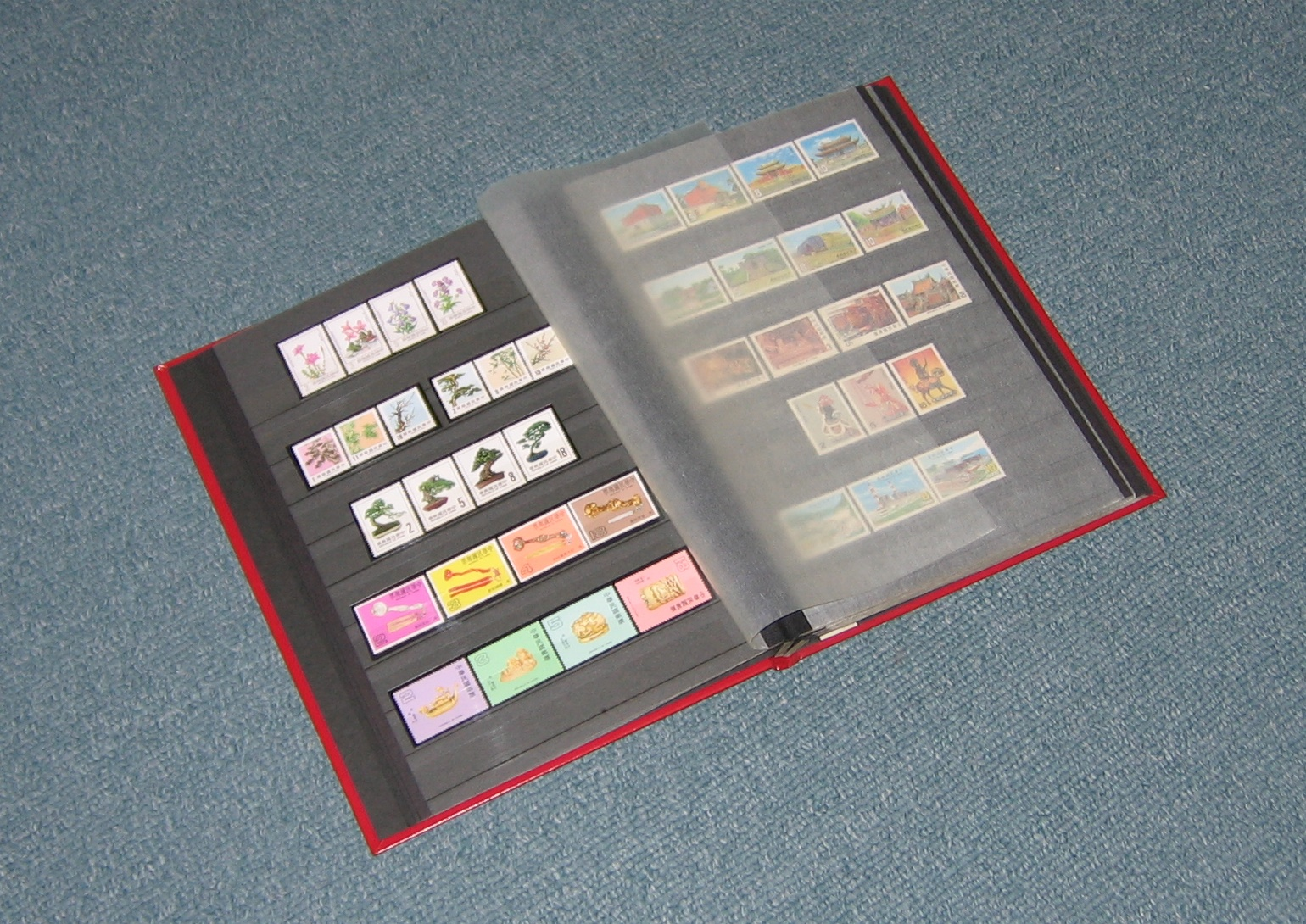
A stamp album used in stamp collecting

Collecting includes seeking, locating, acquiring, organizing, cataloging, displaying and storing. Collecting is appealing to many people due to their interest in a particular subject and a desire to categorize and make order out of complexity. Some collectors are generalists, accumulating items from countries of the world. Others focus on a subtopic within their area of interest, such as 19th century postage stamps.

Collecting is an ancient hobby, with Caesar Augustus being a collector of coins. Sometimes collectors have turned their hobby into a business, becoming commercial dealers that trade in the items being collected.

=== Observing ===
An alternative to collecting physical objects is to observe and collect records of events of a particular kind. Examples include train spotting, bird-watching, aircraft spotting, and any other form of systematic recording a particular phenomenon. The recording form can be written, photographic, online, etc.

=== Making and tinkering ===
Making and tinkering includes working on self-motivated projects for fulfillment. These projects may be progressive, irregular tasks performed over a long period of time. Making and tinkering hobbies include higher-end projects, such as building or restoring a car or building a computer from individual parts. For computer savvy do-it-yourself hobbyists, CNC (Computer Numerical Control) machining may also be popular. A CNC machine can be assembled and programmed to make different parts from wood or metal.

Tinkering is 'dabbling' with the making process, often applied to the hobby of tinkering with car repairs, and various kinds of restoration: of furniture, antique cars, etc. It also applies to household tinkering: repairing a wall, laying a pathway, etc. Examples of Making and Tinkering hobbies include Scale modeling, model engineering, 3D printing, dressmaking, and cooking.

Scale modeling is making a replica of a real-life object in a smaller scale and dates back to prehistoric times with small clay "dolls" and other children's toys that have been found near known populated areas. Some of the earliest scale models of residences were found in Cucuteni–Trypillia culture in Eastern Europe. These artifacts were dated to be around 3000–6000 BC. Similar models dating back to the same period were found in ancient Egypt, India, China and Mesopotamia archaeological sites.

At the turn of the Industrial Age and through the 1920s, some families could afford things such as electric trains, wind-up toys (typically boats or cars) and the increasingly valuable tin toy soldiers. The current form of scale modeling became popular shortly after World War II. Before 1946, children as well as adults were content in carving and shaping wooden replicas from block wood kits, often depicting enemy aircraft to help with identification in case of an invasion.

With the advent of modern plastics, the amount of skill required to get the basic shape accurately shown for any given subject was lessened, making it easier for people of all ages to begin assembling replicas in varying scales. Superheroes, aero planes, boats, cars, tanks, artillery, and even figures of soldiers became quite popular subjects to build, paint and display. Although almost any subject can be found in almost any scale, there are common scales for such miniatures which remain constant today.

Model engineering refers to building functioning machinery in metal, such as internal combustion motors and live steam models or locomotives. This is a demanding hobby that requires a multitude of large and expensive machine tools, such as lathes and mills. This hobby originated in the United Kingdom in the late 19th century, later spreading and flourishing in the mid-20th century. Due to the expense and space required, it is becoming rare.

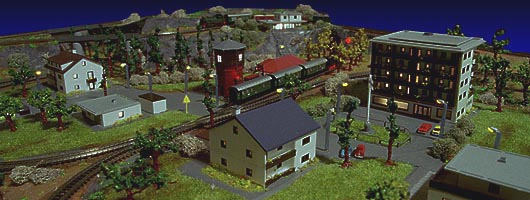
A coffee-table sized model railroad

3D Printing is a relatively new technology and has become a hobby as the cost of printers has come down. It is an example of how hobbyists can quickly engage with new technologies, communicate with one another, and become producers related to their former hobby. 3D modeling is the process of making mathematical representations of three dimensional items and is an aspect of 3D printing.

Dressmaking has been a major hobby up until the late 20th century, in order to make cheap clothes, but also as a creative design and craft challenge. It has been reduced by the low cost of manufactured clothes.

Cooking is for some people an interest, a hobby, a challenge and a source of significant satisfaction. For many other people it is a job, a chore, a duty, like cleaning. In the early 21st century the importance of cooking as a hobby was demonstrated by the high popularity of competitive television cooking programs.

=== Activity participation ===
Activity participation includes partaking in "non-competitive, rule-based pursuits."

Outdoor pursuits are the group of activities which occur outdoors. These hobbies include gardening, hill walking, hiking, backpacking, cycling, canoeing, climbing, caving, fishing, hunting, target shooting (informal or formal), wildlife viewing (as birdwatching) and engaging in watersports and snowsports.

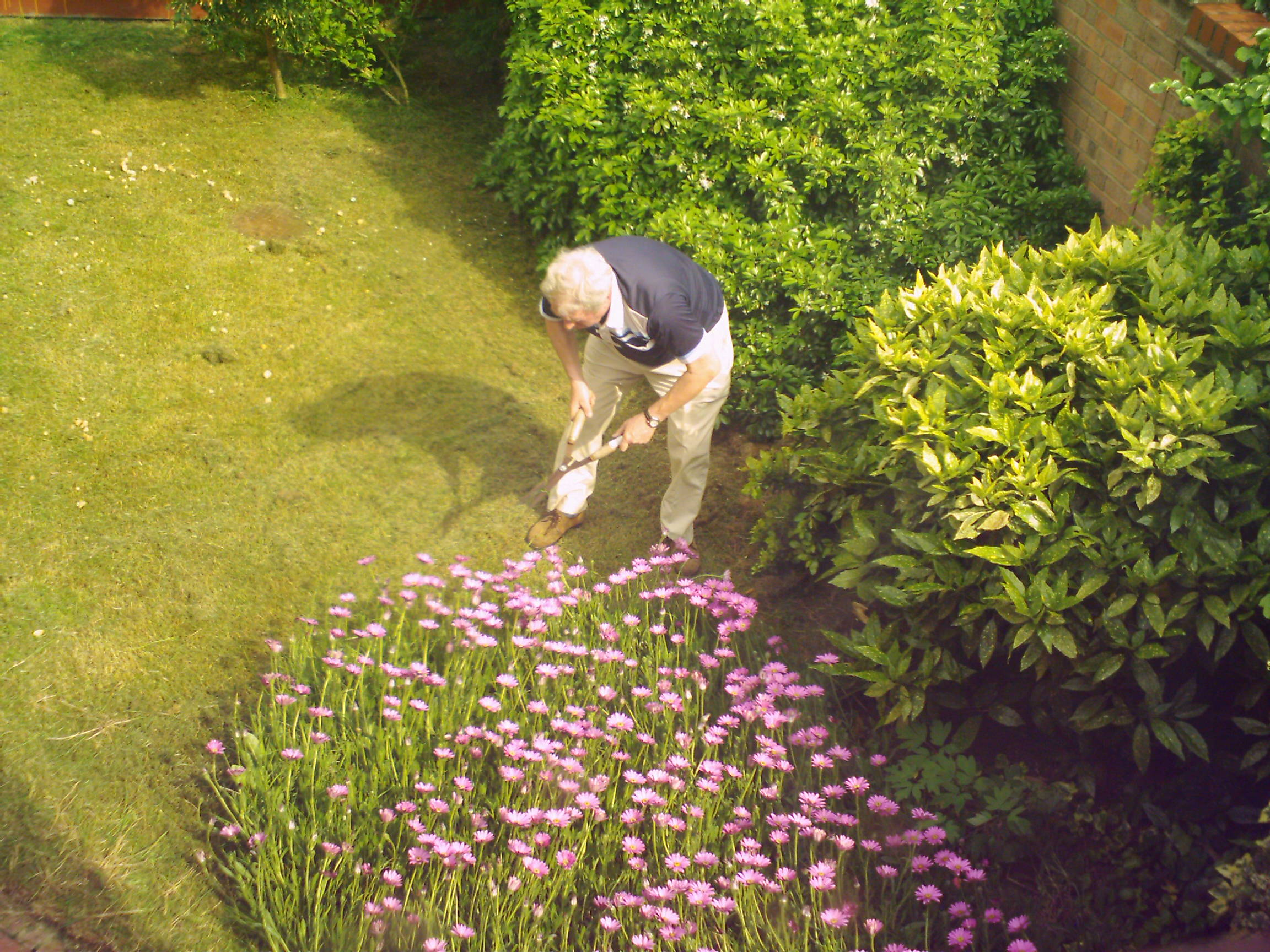
Gardening

One large subset of outdoor pursuits is gardening. Residential gardening most often takes place in or about one's own residence, in a space referred to as the garden. Although a garden typically is located on the land near a residence, it may also be located on a roof, in an atrium, on a balcony, in a windowbox, or on a patio or vivarium.

Gardening also takes place in non-residential green areas, such as parks, public or semi-public gardens (botanical gardens or zoological gardens), amusement and theme parks, along transportation corridors, and around tourist attractions and hotels. In these situations, a staff of gardeners or groundskeepers maintains the gardens.

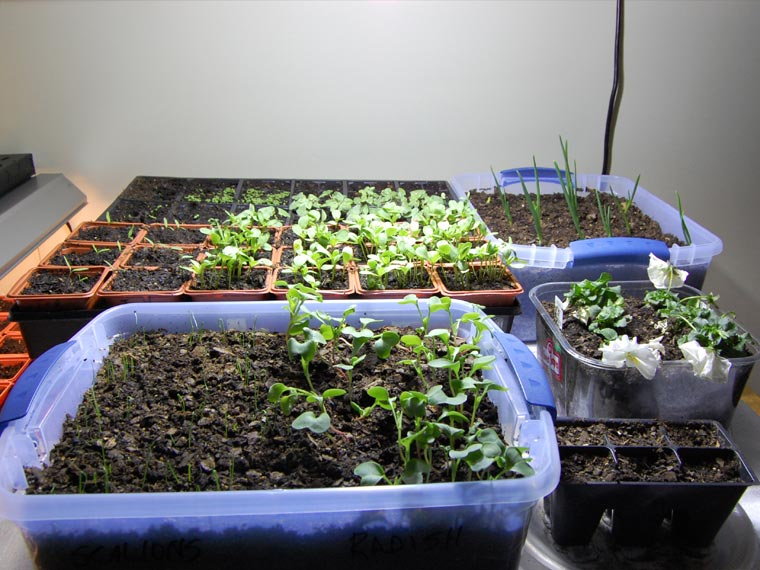
A variety of flowers and vegetables in an indoor garden

Indoor gardening is concerned with growing houseplants within a residence or building, in a conservatory, or in a greenhouse. Indoor gardens are sometimes incorporated into air conditioning or heating systems.

Water gardening is concerned with growing plants that have adapted to pools and ponds, along with aqua-scaping in planted aquariums. Bog gardens are also considered a type of water garden. A simple water garden may consist solely of a tub containing the water and plants.

Container gardening is concerned with growing plants in containers that are placed above the ground.

=== Liberal arts pursuits ===
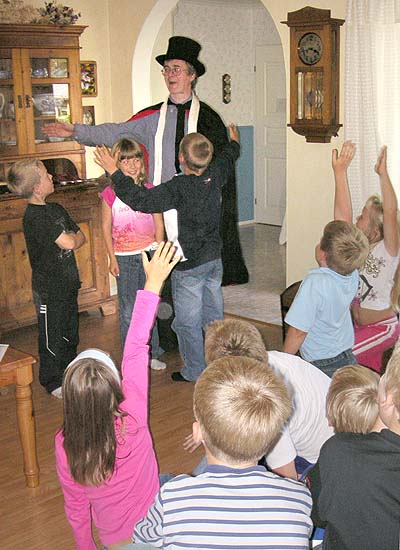
An amateur magician performing

Many hobbies involve performances by the hobbyist, such as singing, acting, juggling, magic, dancing, playing a musical instrument, martial arts, and other performing arts.

Some hobbies may result in an end product. Examples of this would be woodworking, photography, moviemaking, jewelry making, software projects such as Photoshopping and home music or video production, making bracelets, artistic projects such as drawing, painting, cosplay (design, creation, and wearing a costume based on an already existing creative property), creating models out of card stock or paper – called papercraft (which includes origami), Many of these fall under the category visual arts.

Writing is often taken up as a hobby by aspiring writers and usually appears in the form of personal blog, guest posting or fan fiction (literary art resulting in creation of written content based on already existing, licensed creative property under specified terms).

Reading books, eBooks, magazines, comics, or newspapers, along with browsing the internet is a common hobby, and one that can trace its origins back hundreds of years. A love of literature, later in life, may be sparked by an interest in reading children's literature as a child. Many of these fall under the category literary arts.

Knitting and crocheting are other hobbies. Knitting involves two needles and crocheting uses a hook. Both use stitching to create a textile.

=== Sports and games ===
Stebbins distinguishes an amateur sports person and a hobbyist by suggesting a hobbyist plays in less formal sports, or games that are rule-bound and have no professional equivalent. On the other hand, an amateur sports individual plays a sport with a professional equivalent such as football or tennis. Amateur sport may range from informal play to highly competitive practice such as deck tennis or long-distance trekking.

The Department for Culture, Media, and Support in England suggests that playing sports benefits physical and mental health. A positive relationship appeared between engaging in sports and improving overall health.

== Psychological role ==
During the 20th century and beyond, there was extensive research into the important role that play has in human development. While most evident in childhood, play continues throughout life for many adults in the form of games, hobbies, and sport. Moreover, studies of aging and society support the value of hobbies in healthy aging.

== Significant achievements ==
There have been many instances where hobbyists and amateurs have achieved significant discoveries and developments. These are a small sample.

- Amateur astronomers have explored the skies for centuries, and there is a long list of Notable amateur astronomers who have made major discoveries. Amateur astronomers Alan Hale and Thomas Bopp discovered the Comet Hale–Bopp in 1995.
- A substantial amount of early scientific research came from the amateur activities of the wealthy, such as Antoine Lavoisier's contributions to the science of chemistry and Benjamin Franklin's investigations into electricity.
- Open source is a development model using open collaboration to cooperate on projects. It is most notable in the development of software and widely used software, which has been developed and maintained by large numbers of people, including many home-based amateurs with high-level expertise.
- While the general public was not aware of nature observation which was formally conducted as field research, during the 1930s, practitioners of the hobby went on to become the pioneers of the conservation movement that flourished in the UK from 1965 onwards.

== See also ==
- Avocation
- Entertainment
- Community of interest
- Personal life
- Play (activity)
- Special interest (autism)
