= Alfa Romeo 80A =

Chronology
- Predecessor: Alfa Romeo 40A
- Successor: Alfa Romeo 85A

Alfa Romeo 80A was a bus produced by Italian manufacturer Alfa Romeo in the late 1920s. Succeeding the Alfa Romeo 40A, it was primarily used in Italy and was less successful in the rest of Europe.

== Technical characteristics ==
The Alfa Romeo 80A came powered by a Diesel engine with 52 bhp (39 kW). It featured three different wheelbases and was 2,030 mm (79.9 in) wide and 2,010 mm (79.1 in) tall. Inside, it was equipped with single and double seats made of wood and came with two double doors on the right hand side and a single door on the driver's side.

== Transport ==
- ATAC Romeo
- ATM Milan

== See also ==
- List of buses
