= Alan Hale (astronomer) =

American astronomer; co-discoverer of Comet Hale–Bopp (1958–2026)

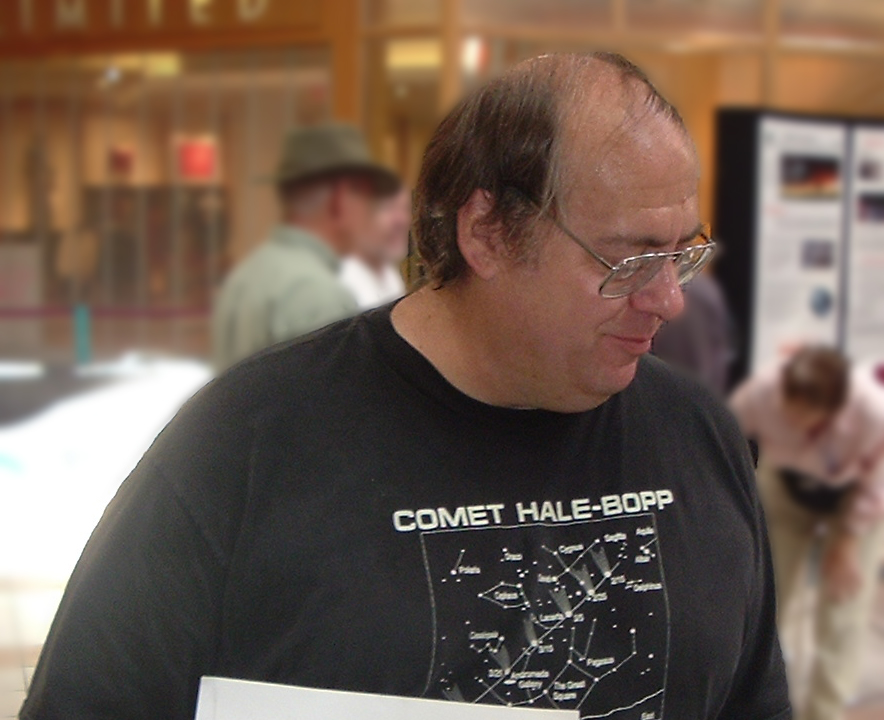
- Hale in 2005
- Born: March 7, 1958; Tachikawa, Japan
- Died: June 6, 2026 (aged 68); Cloudcroft, New Mexico, U.S.
- Education: New Mexico State University; United States Naval Academy
- Known for: Co-discovery of Comet Hale–Bopp
- Scientific career
- Fields: Astronomy, physics
- Workplaces: New Mexico Museum of Space History; Earthrise Institute
- Thesis: Orbital Coplanarity in Solar-Type Binary Systems: Implications for Planetary System Formation and Detection (1992)

Alan Hale (March 7, 1958 – June 6, 2026) was an American professional astronomer who co-discovered Comet Hale–Bopp independently of its other co-discoverer, Thomas Bopp, an amateur astronomer.

Hale specialized in the study of Sun-like stars and the search for extra-solar planetary systems, and had side interests in the fields of comets and near-Earth asteroids. He was an astronomer most of his life and served as the president of the Earthrise Institute, which he founded, and which has as its mission the use of astronomy as a tool for breaking down international and intercultural barriers. The International Astronomical Union (IAU) named an asteroid in Hale's honor, 4151 Alanhale, in recognition of his numerous comet observations.

== Early life and career ==
Alan Hale was born on March 7, 1958, in Tachikawa, Japan, where his father was serving in the United States Air Force. Four months later his father was transferred to Holloman Air Force Base outside Alamogordo, New Mexico.

Hale was raised in Alamogordo, where his father retired from the Air Force and worked in civil service. In 2013 Hale said, "I refuse to say that 'I grew up there' because anyone who knows me knows that I really haven't grown up yet." He credited several factors for inspiring his interest in science and astronomy in the 1960s: the clear night skies in Alamogordo, library books on astronomy his father gave him in the first grade, the U.S. space program, and the original Star Trek television series. Hale also said that as a child he was interested in other sciences as well, and he "went through a dinosaur phase when I was in second grade. I knew them all. Drove my parent nuts."

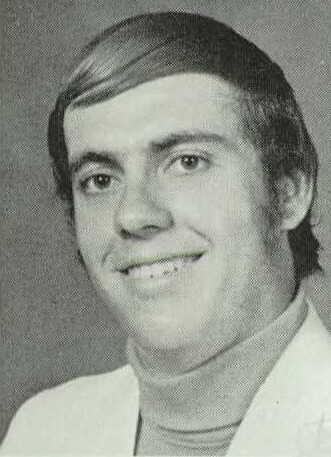
Hale's 1976 yearbook photo at Alamogordo High School

Hale graduated from Alamogordo High School in 1976, and then served in the United States Navy from 1976 to 1983. He graduated from the United States Naval Academy in 1980 with a bachelor's degree in physics. Following his Navy service he worked at the Jet Propulsion Laboratory (JPL) until 1986 as an engineering contractor for Allied Bendix Aerospace working on the NASA Deep Space Network project, as well as on several spacecraft projects. During the 1986 Voyager 2 fly-by of Uranus, he worked with the Radio Science Experiment, using the spacecraft carrier signal to deduce information about Uranus's atmosphere and rings.

After leaving JPL, Hale enrolled in the astronomy department of New Mexico State University, Las Cruces, where he earned a Master's Degree and a PhD in 1989 and 1992 respectively, both in astronomy. His doctoral dissertation was published in the January 1994 issue of The Astronomical Journal. After completing his studies at New Mexico State University, Hale worked at the New Mexico Museum of Space History in Alamogordo as its staff astronomer and outreach education coordinator.

== Earthrise Institute ==
In 1993, Hale founded the Southwest Institute for Space Research (SWISR), which later became the Earthrise Institute, where Hale served as president.

Hale said, "There is an entire generation that has come of age having never really seen the dark sky", so part of what he wanted to accomplish with Earthrise was "to create an environment where students could spend some nights out under a dark sky and see what it really looks like."

In 1999, Hale assembled a group of American scientists, students, and educators for a two-week+ trip to Iran (coinciding with a solar eclipse) during which they gave talks throughout the country. Hale feels that "Science is a ... universal language" and "it would be a great idea if we could use science as a tool to bring people together ... to break down barriers between nations and between cultures." Hale uses the expression 'Science Diplomacy' in this context, which he says he may have coined. "The sky looks the same from Iran as it does from here in the US. It's the same sky we study ... Science does not know political boundaries."

This sentiment is reflected in the mission of his Earthrise Institute, which is "to use astronomy, space, and other related endeavors as a tool for breaking down international and intercultural barriers and for bringing humanity together." Earthrise's inaugural educational project was announced in a press release on March 1, 2007:

The Earthrise Institute is pleased to announce its inaugural educational project, entitled "Countdown to 500 Comets." The project takes its name and focus from Earthrise Institute founder and President Alan Hale's quest to observe 500 comets, begun over 37 years ago. He has recently collected his 400th comet and, in his words, "I've decided to share my quest for comet number 500 with the astronomy students of the world ... Students of all ages and nationalities are invited to participate in "Countdown." The goal ... is for students to observe as many of Dr. Hale's next 100 comets as they are able, either by viewing them through a telescope, and/or by taking images of them with appropriately equipped telescopic cameras. Special awards will be presented to any student who successfully observes ten of Dr. Hale's next 100 comets. Hale estimates that it will take him five to seven years to collect those 100 comets, and thus, there are plenty of opportunities for participation.

Hale was active with the Earthrise Institute and performed science outreach. For example, his "In Our Skies" column appears in the Alamogordo Daily News, in which he discusses current astronomical issues.

In 2019, Hale announced he was authoring a weekly educational series about the "small bodies" of the Solar System. The series, titled Ice and Stone 2020, featured three presentations about comets and asteroids—This Week in History, Comet of the week, and a Special Topic—released each week throughout 2020. Ice and Stone 2020 is available for free online at the websites of both the Earthrise Institute and RocketSTEM.

== Discovery of Comet Hale–Bopp ==
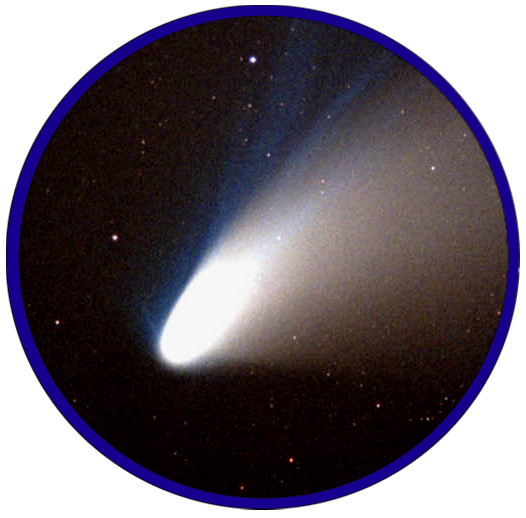
Comet Hale–Bopp

Hale first spotted the comet that would come to bear his name from his home in Cloudcroft, New Mexico, where the night sky is exceptionally dark. Since 1970 Hale had observed over 200 known comets, and on the night of July 22–23, 1995, after finishing his observations of periodic Comet Clark, and while waiting for periodic Comet d'Arrest to become visible above the horizon, he "decided to pass the time by observing some deep-sky objects in Sagittarius", and pointed his Meade DS-16 telescope towards globular cluster M70. He said that he "immediately noticed a fuzzy object in the field" which had not been present when he had observed that region of the sky two weeks earlier.

After consulting his astronomical sources, and determining that the comet was likely unknown, Hale said:

I sent an email to Brian Marsden and Dan Green at the Central Bureau ... informing them of a possible comet; later, when I had verified that the object had moved against the background stars, I sent them an additional email. I continued to follow the comet for a total of about 3 hours, until it set behind trees in the southwest, and then was able to email a detailed report, complete with two positions.

Unknown to Hale, that night Thomas Bopp was observing the same region of the sky with friends near Stanfield, Arizona. At around 11:00 p.m., Bopp was observing M70 through his telescope and "noticed a fainter, fuzzy object coming into the field". Bopp and his friends determined that it was a comet, and after Bopp returned home he informed Central Bureau of his discovery.

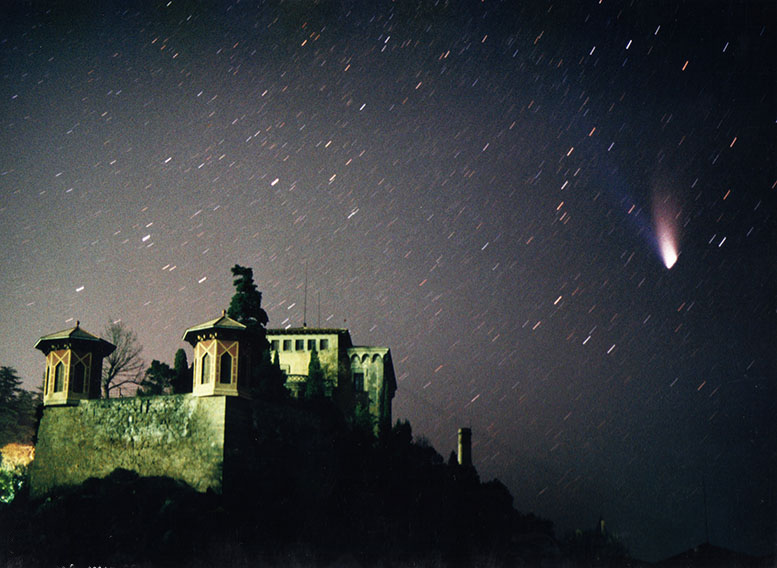
Comet Hale–Bopp

On July 23, the IAU issued Circular 6187 to announce the joint discovery of the new comet. Per Hale, calculations indicate that Hale–Bopp likely last appeared on the order of 4000 years ago, but any record of this previous encounter had not yet been positively identified from ancient records. It has also been determined that Hale–Bopp will not return to the inner Solar System until approximately 4385.

Comet Hale–Bopp, originally labeled C/1995 O1, and sometimes called "the Great Comet of 1997", became one of the most-viewed comets in human history, and the brightest comet seen since Comet West in 1976, appearing "1000 times brighter than Comet Halley did at the same distance."

When the comet was at the peak of its brightness, Hale says he was giving talks about the comet in big cities with light-polluted night skies, so he did not get a chance "to see it all that much when it was really bright."

Regarding the press conference of the comet's discovery, Hale praised the reporting done by "the very first reporter that broke the story of the comet's discovery," the Albuquerque Journal science reporter John Fleck:

John spoiled me. The rest of the media ... were mostly not like him. I would go round and round the same things over and over and over again and they would still get it wrong.

As an example of the media getting it wrong, Hale told this story:

Due to frustration with the reporter interviewing him for USA Today when they asked him about a supposed UFO following the comet, Hale made a joke that he would meet the aliens when they land at Roswell and confront them for following "his" comet. Hale stated that the resulting article reported in seriousness that "Hale said he will go to Roswell to meet the spacecraft when it lands." And that line was the only thing they reported of what he said in the entire 45-minute interview.

== Heaven's Gate reaction ==
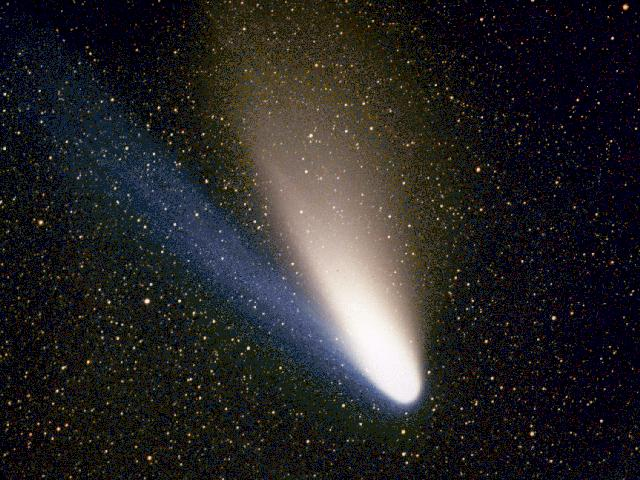
Comet Hale–Bopp taken from Davis, West Virginia, U.S., on March 11, 1997

Historically linked to the discovery and first recorded appearance of Hale–Bopp is Heaven's Gate, a religious cult in San Diego led by Marshall Applewhite who preached that an alien spacecraft was following Comet Hale–Bopp. The cult members believed that transporting their souls to the spacecraft and evacuating the Earth—which was soon to be "recycled"—would permit them to achieve salvation. Applewhite and 38 followers poisoned themselves over three days in March 1997 in the belief this would allow them to pass through "Heaven's Gate" and achieve "the Evolutionary Level Above Human". The rationale for taking their lives was (and is, as of this writing) clearly detailed on the group's Web site, which is maintained by surviving cult members.

When news broke of the Heaven's Gate mass suicides and their relation to Comet Hale–Bopp, Hale's phone "never stopped ringing the entire day." Hale did not respond until the next day, when he spoke at a press conference on the subject, only after he had researched details of the incident.

At the 20th annual convention of the Freedom from Religion Foundation (FFRF) in Tampa, Florida, in 1997 Hale was a featured speaker and discussed the suicides, calling their death pact and other religion-fostered violence "another victory for ignorance and superstition."

Speaking at the Second World Skeptics Congress in Heidelberg, Germany, on July 24, 1998:

Dr. Hale discussed the scientific significance and popular lore of comets and gave a personal account of his discovery. He then lambasted the combination of scientific illiteracy, willful delusions, a radio talk-show's deception about an imaginary spacecraft following the comet, and a cult's bizarre yearnings for ascending to another level of existence that led to the Heaven's Gate mass suicides.

Hale said that, well before Heaven's Gate, he had told a colleague:

"We are probably going to have some suicides as a result of this comet." The sad part is that I was really not surprised. Comets are lovely objects, but they don't have apocalyptic significance. We must use our minds, our reason.

== Media appearances ==
Following his discovery of Comet Hale–Bopp, Hale was in demand to speak about the comet bearing his name, and this gave him a platform to discuss Hale-Bopp as well as general astronomy and science. Hale was a guest speaker at the February 16, 1996, meeting of New Mexicans for Science and Reason (NMSR) which according to member and Science Watch host Dave Thomas "was one of our most memorable and well-attended ever." Hale spoke on "Comet Hale–Bopp: Potentials and Opportunities" and cautioned against complacency about asteroid and comet impacts on the Earth, saying that:

Although Hale–Bopp will miss Earth by more than 1 AU, the newly-discovered Comet Hyakutake will come within 0.102 AU of our planet. Hyakutake's near-miss of Earth will occur in late March of this year; it was discovered in late January. That's not very much advance warning.

On February 26, 1997, Hale was the guest speaker for two public lectures sponsored by the Center for Particle Astrophysics at UC Berkeley. Hale has been a periodic guest on The Space Show, an Internet radio talk show centering on space commerce and exploration, which is also available as a podcast. On the March 19, 2002, broadcast, Hale spoke of the importance of the search for Near-Earth Asteroids (NEAs) and their danger to civilization:

Even though a major catastrophic event would be very unlikely to occur during our lifetime, if it were to occur it would wipe out a significant fraction of the Earth's population ... The chances that there will actually be a major catastrophic world-wide event during our lifetime are actually very slim, but they are NOT zero. If we know where (the NEAs) are we can project their motions out decades into the future. At least then if there is something heading our way we'll have enough lead time – decades perhaps – in order to figure out what we might want to do about it. For objects a hundred meters in diameter we are talking (just) centuries. One such small object exploded over the Siberia wilderness in 1908 (the Tunguska event) and created blast effects similar to a nuclear explosion ... If that happened 4 hours later it would have been over Moscow and would have changed world history.

From 2004 to 2006 Hale was host of a weekly radio program, The Other Side of the Sky (the precursor to Earthrise Radio). On March 11, 2006, Hale was interviewed on the NMSR's Science Watch radio show in an episode called "An Hour-long visit with Dr. Alan Hale, co-discoverer of the Hale–Bopp Comet!"

== Scientific skepticism advocacy ==
As a scientific skeptic, Hale was a periodic contributor to Skeptical Inquirer magazine. One of his articles, titled "An Astronomer's Personal Statement on UFOs", appeared in the March/April 1997 edition. In the article Hale stated:

When I am confronted with beliefs about UFOs or other paranormal phenomena—or, for that matter, just about anything—I am guided by three basic principles, to wit:

1. Extraordinary claims require extraordinary evidence.
2. The burden of proof is on the positive. (If you are making an extraordinary claim, the burden is on you to produce the extraordinary evidence to prove that you are correct; the burden is not on me to prove that you are wrong.)
3. Occam's razor: If one is confronted with a series of phenomena for which there exists more than one viable explanation, one should choose the simplest explanation which fits all the observed facts.

After an analysis of the claims of extraterrestrial visitation with regards to these three principles, Hale concluded:

In summary, I consider it likely that there are advanced alien races somewhere "out there," and I remain open to the possibility that, unlikely as it may seem, one or more such races could be visiting Earth. But if so, where are they? If they possess the technology capable of traveling interstellar distances, then they are so far ahead of us that there can be no reason for them to be afraid of us. If they wish to hide from us, they could do so easily; if they don't wish to, then they have no need to play games with us and only show themselves to a few unwitting individuals. Let them reveal themselves to humanity at large, to our scientists, and to me.

== Atheist activism ==
Hale was an atheist and member of the honorary board of the online group Internet Infidels, which has the mission of using the Internet to promote a view that supernatural forces or entities do not exist. Hale stated on religion that:

I'm quite biased against invoking mysterious mythical beings that other people want to claim exist but which they can offer no evidence for. By telling students that the beliefs of a superstitious tribe thousands of years ago should be treated on an equal basis with the evidence collected with our most advanced equipment today is to completely undermine the entire process of scientific inquiry.

== Death ==
By 2025 age-associated health issues forced Hale to retire from regular comet observing. He died at his home in Cloudcroft, New Mexico, on June 6, 2026, at the age of 68. Prior to his death, he had been experiencing complications from a surgical procedure.

== Awards and honors ==
In 1980 Alan Hale was awarded the Navy League of the United States prize in Applied Physics.

In 1991, years prior to his discovery of Hale–Bopp, the IAU named an asteroid, 4151 Alanhale, in Hale's honor in recognition of his numerous comet observations, stating that:

In the past several years he has published careful visual observations of more than 130 comets, several at more than one apparition. His observations include both magnitude estimates and confirmations of discoveries. He has also applied his magnitude estimating skill to asteroids, particularly the fast-moving objects 1989 AC and 1989 VA, and has participated in asteroid occultation teams. He has done much to promote asteroid-comet education through articles on comets and emphasis on asteroids in his introductory astronomy classes.

The name was suggested by Carolyn and Eugene Shoemaker, while David Levy provided the citation.

== Selected works ==
=== Books ===
- Everybody's Comet: A Layman's Guide to Hale–Bopp
- Great Balls of Ice: A Century of Comets
- the comet man (a memoir) e-book

=== Scientific journals ===
- The Astronomical Journal: Dissertation published in January 1994
- The International Comet Quarterly:

=== Popular publications ===
From August 2002 to January 2003, Hale wrote a weekly newspaper column for the Space Frontier Foundation, titled "In Our Skies", which has been archived online. He also wrote a monthly column titled "Hale to the Stars". Hale contributed to the Alamogordo Daily News with his "In Our Skies" column, covering a variety of astronomical and spaceflight topics.

Other publications to which Hale contributed include Astronomy, Skeptical Inquirer, Free Inquiry and the McGraw-Hill Encyclopedia of Science & Technology.

== Professional societies ==
- American Astronomical Society
- Sigma Pi Sigma
