= Model 70 =

Model 70 may refer to:

== Aircraft ==
- Aeromarine-Klemm Model 70 Trainer, an American derivative of the Klemm Kl 25, a German light aircraft produced by Klemm
- Beech Model 70, a twin-piston-engine civil utility aircraft
- Curtiss Model 70, also known as the Curtiss XF13C, a fighter aircraft
- Learjet Model 70, a mid-size business jet

== Firearms ==
- Beretta Model 70, a semi-automatic pistol
- Winchester Model 70, a bolt-action sporting rifle

== Other ==
- Dana/Spicer Model 70, an automotive axle
- IBM PS/2 Model 70, a midrange member of the PS/2 family of personal computers
- RCA Spectra Model 70/15, a model of mainframe computer

== See also ==
- M70 (disambiguation)
