= 4151 Alanhale =

Carbonaceous main-belt asteroid

Discovery
- Discovered by: C. S. Shoemaker; E. M. Shoemaker
- Discovery site: Palomar Obs.
- Discovery date: 24 April 1985

Designations
- Named after: Alan Hale (astronomer)
- Alternative designations: 1985 HV_{1} · 1968 HD; 1976 SO_{1} · 1979 FX_{1} 1982 SZ_{4} · 1985 JX
- Minor planet category: main-belt · Themis

Orbital characteristics
- Epoch 4 September 2017 (JD 2458000.5)
- Uncertainty parameter 0
- Observation arc: 48.95 yr (17,878 days)
- Aphelion: 3.5904 AU
- Perihelion: 2.7017 AU
- Semi-major axis: 3.1461 AU
- Eccentricity: 0.1412
- Orbital period (sidereal): 5.58 yr (2,038 days)
- Mean anomaly: 346.46°
- Mean motion: 0° 10^{m} 35.76^{s} / day
- Inclination: 1.0079°
- Longitude of ascending node: 67.051°
- Argument of perihelion: 75.088°

Physical characteristics
- Dimensions: 15.37 km (calculated); 19.526±0.269 km 22.66±0.59 km
- Synodic rotation period: 11.9177±0.0047 h
- Geometric albedo: 0.045±0.006; 0.0734±0.0099; 0.08 (assumed)
- Spectral type: C
- Absolute magnitude (H): 11.976±0.003 (R) · 12.0 · 12.20 · 12.3 · 12.43 · 12.78±0.21

4151 Alanhale, provisional designation 1985 HV_{1}, is a carbonaceous Themistian asteroid from the outer region of the asteroid belt, approximately 19 kilometers in diameter. It was discovered by the American astronomer couple Carolyn and Eugene Shoemaker at the U.S. Palomar Observatory, California, on 24 April 1985. It was named for American astronomer Alan Hale.

== Orbit and classification ==
Alanhale is a member of the Themis family, a dynamical family of outer-belt asteroids with nearly coplanar ecliptical orbits. It orbits the Sun in the outer main-belt at a distance of 2.7–3.6 AU once every 5 years and 7 months (2,038 days). Its orbit has an eccentricity of 0.14 and an inclination of 1° with respect to the ecliptic. It was first identified as 1968 HD at Zimmerwald Observatory in 1968, extending the body's observation arc by 17 years prior to its official discovery observation at Palomar.

== Physical characteristics ==
Alanhale has been characterized as a dark C-type asteroid by PanSTARRS' photometric survey.

=== Rotation period ===
A rotational lightcurve of Alanhale was obtained from photometric observations made at the U.S. Palomar Transient Factory in October 2010. The fragmentary lightcurve gave a rotation period of 11.9177±0.0047 hours with a low brightness variation of 0.07 in magnitude (U=1).

=== Diameter and albedo ===
According to the surveys carried out by NASA's spaced-based Wide-field Infrared Survey Explorer and its subsequent NEOWISE mission, Alanhale measures 19.5 and 22.7 kilometers in diameter, respectively, with a corresponding albedo of 0.07 and 0.05. The Collaborative Asteroid Lightcurve Link assumes an albedo of 0.08 and calculates a smaller diameter of 15.4 kilometers with an absolute magnitude of 12.43.

== Naming ==
This minor planet was named in honor of American astronomer Alan Hale (1958–2026), co-discoverer of comet Hale–Bopp.

His precise visual observations include more than 130 comets, several at more than one apparition, and both, magnitude estimates and confirmations of discoveries. He has also skillfully estimated the magnitudes of the near-Earth objects, 4179 Toutatis and (99907) 1989 VA, and has performed asteroid occultation. Hale has promoted the study of small Solar System bodies in articles and in his astronomy lectures. The official naming citation was provided by David Levy and published by the Minor Planet Center on 28 April 1991 (M.P.C. 18139).
