= M70 =

M70, M-70, or M.70 may refer to:

== Transportation ==
- BMW M70, a 1990s V12 automobile engine
- M-70 (Michigan highway), a former state highway in Michigan
- M-70 (marine highway), a federal marine highway, including parts of the Mississippi River, the Missouri River, and the Ohio River
- M70 motorway (Hungary), a motorway in Hungary
- Macchi M.70, an Italian light biplane of the late 1920s
- M70 (Johannesburg), a road in Johannesburg

== Other uses ==
- Messier 70, a globular cluster in the constellation Sagittarius
- Zastava M70, a Yugoslav version of the AK-47 assault rifle
- M 70, an age group for Masters athletics (athletes aged 35+)
- M70, a Samsung Sens laptop computer model

== See also ==
- Model 70 (disambiguation)
