= Thomas Bopp =

American astronomer (1949–2018)

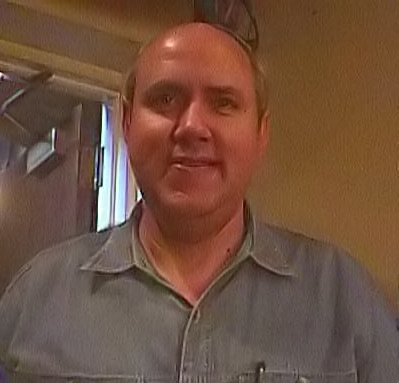
- Thomas Bopp in 1997 at Comet Chasers: On the Trail of a Comet
- Born: October 15, 1949; Denver, Colorado, U.S.
- Died: January 5, 2018 (aged 68); Phoenix, Arizona, U.S.
- Education: Youngstown State University
- Occupations: Professional speaker, amateur astronomer
- Known for: Co-discovery of comet Hale–Bopp with Alan Hale

Thomas Joel Bopp (October 15, 1949 – January 5, 2018) was an American amateur astronomer. In 1995, he discovered comet Hale–Bopp; Alan Hale discovered it independently at almost the same time, and it was thus named after both of them. At the time of the comet discovery he was a manager at a construction materials factory and an amateur astronomer. On the night of July 22, Bopp was observing the sky with friends in the Arizona desert when he made the discovery. It was the first comet he had observed and he was using a borrowed, home-built telescope.

== Early life and education ==
Bopp was born October 15, 1949, in Denver, Colorado. The following year his family relocated to Youngstown, Ohio. It was there that, at the age of three, his father Frank Bopp introduced him to astronomy on the porch steps of the family home as they watched a meteor shower. Frank began to teach him about planets, constellations and the aurora borealis. At the age of ten he received his first telescope, a four-inch reflector.

Bopp attended Chaney High School and graduated in 1967. He joined the United States Air Force and served in the Philippines where several times he observed the green flash, an optical phenomenon which occurs just before sunset above the setting sun. After 18 months of service he was moved to Davis–Monthan Air Force Base in Tucson, Arizona, where he met his wife-to-be Charlotte. He left the Air Force in 1972. The couple soon married and had a daughter, April. Bopp then attended Youngstown State University and studied business administration. While attending the university, he had access to the physics and astronomy departments and took their classes as part of the elective elements of his education. It was here he met Yale University astrophysicist Dr. Edwin Bishop and Youngstown State emeritus professor of Astronomy Dr. Warren Young, who encouraged him to join the Mahoning Valley Astronomical Society (MVAS) in Warren, Ohio. He regularly attended meetings and became friends with astronaut Ronald A. Parise and enjoyed observing deep sky objects with the club's 16" Newtonian reflector telescope.

== Discovery of comet Hale–Bopp ==
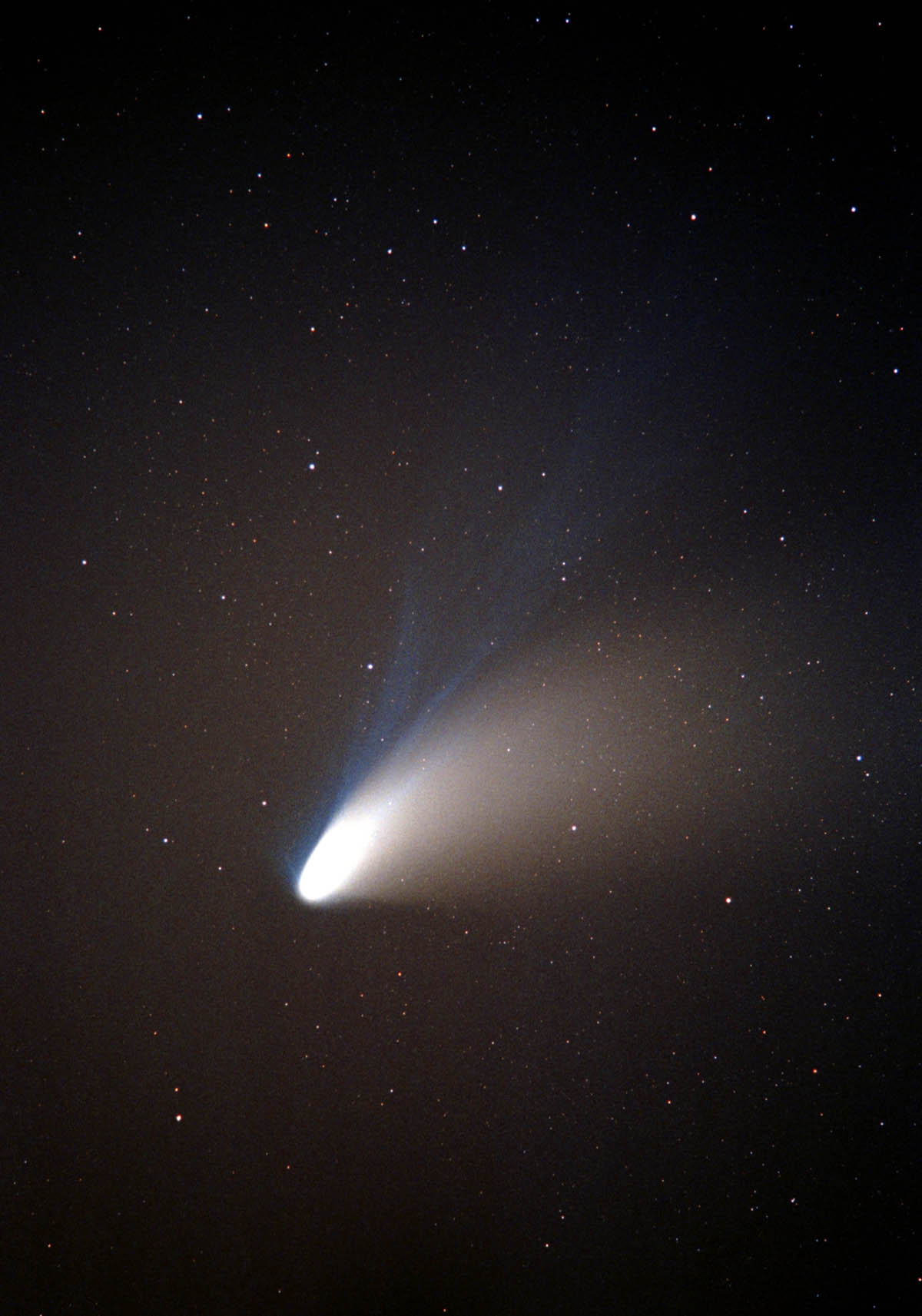
Comet Hale–Bopp

In 1980, Bopp moved to Phoenix, Arizona, to work in the parts department of a construction company and continued to attend astronomy clubs in the local area. He joined the North Phoenix Alternative Astronomical Society, an unofficial group of enthusiasts founded by Kevin Gill, who met up to observe in the Arizona desert. Despite multiple attempts, prior to 1995, Bopp had never observed a comet. At this time Bopp was making use of a 17.5-inch reflecting telescope belonging to close friend Jim Stevens. On the night of July 22, 1995, eight members of the club met at an undisclosed spot near Vekol Ranch, ninety miles south of Phoenix and, as usual, Stevens and Bopp were sharing time looking through Stevens' telescope. Stevens had set up his newest home-built telescope and decided to look for globular clusters. Stevens lined up Messier 70 (M70) in the constellation Sagittarius and called Bopp over to look. At around 11 p.m. Bopp looked into the telescope and said, "What's this other object?" Stevens replied, "You might have something there, Tom." Bopp later described what he saw as "a little fuzzy glow", which he initially believed to be a galaxy. On the same night, professional astronomer and experienced comet observer Alan Hale had spotted the same thing at his home in Cloudcroft, New Mexico, while he was waiting for Comet d'Arrest to appear above the horizon. Bopp, on the other hand, had never seen a comet before. Bopp and his friends checked star charts and watched the object for an hour to determine whether it was moving. Bopp and another member of the group, Bertie Sanden, made drawings of its position in relation to other nearby dim stars and, on discovering the movement, Bopp attempted to contact the Central Bureau for Astronomical Telegrams at the International Astronomical Union (IAU) in Cambridge, Massachusetts, the organization that records all astronomical sightings and names them, to officially log his findings. Discovering his cell phone had no coverage in the desert, he drove towards home, stopping at a public payphone before realizing he did not have the phone number. At home again, Bopp finally reported the sighting by telegram to the IAU. Bopp had taken the institute's name literally and sent a telegram via Western Union. Hale had already sent three emails with the comet's coordinates.

Bopp later acknowledged the chance discovery:

I never seriously thought I would find anything like that. The chances of me discovering a bright comet, something that occurs once every 20 years or so, were astronomically small.

At 8:25 a.m. the following morning, the office of Brian Marsden, director of the Central Bureau for Astronomical Telegrams, called him back to confirm the sighting was, indeed, a comet. The comet was given the formal name Comet 1995 O1, and three days later its full title, C/1995 O1 (Hale–Bopp), designating the first comet found during the second half-month of July 1995. Hale's name precedes Bopp's, because his was the first report to arrive. It is uncertain who was the first to discover it, as they both spotted it at around the same time. The following day Hale phoned Bopp to introduce himself with the words, "I think that we have something in common." When they met at a conference two months later, Bopp said to the press that he was glad that Hale "turned out to be a nice guy."

== After the discovery ==
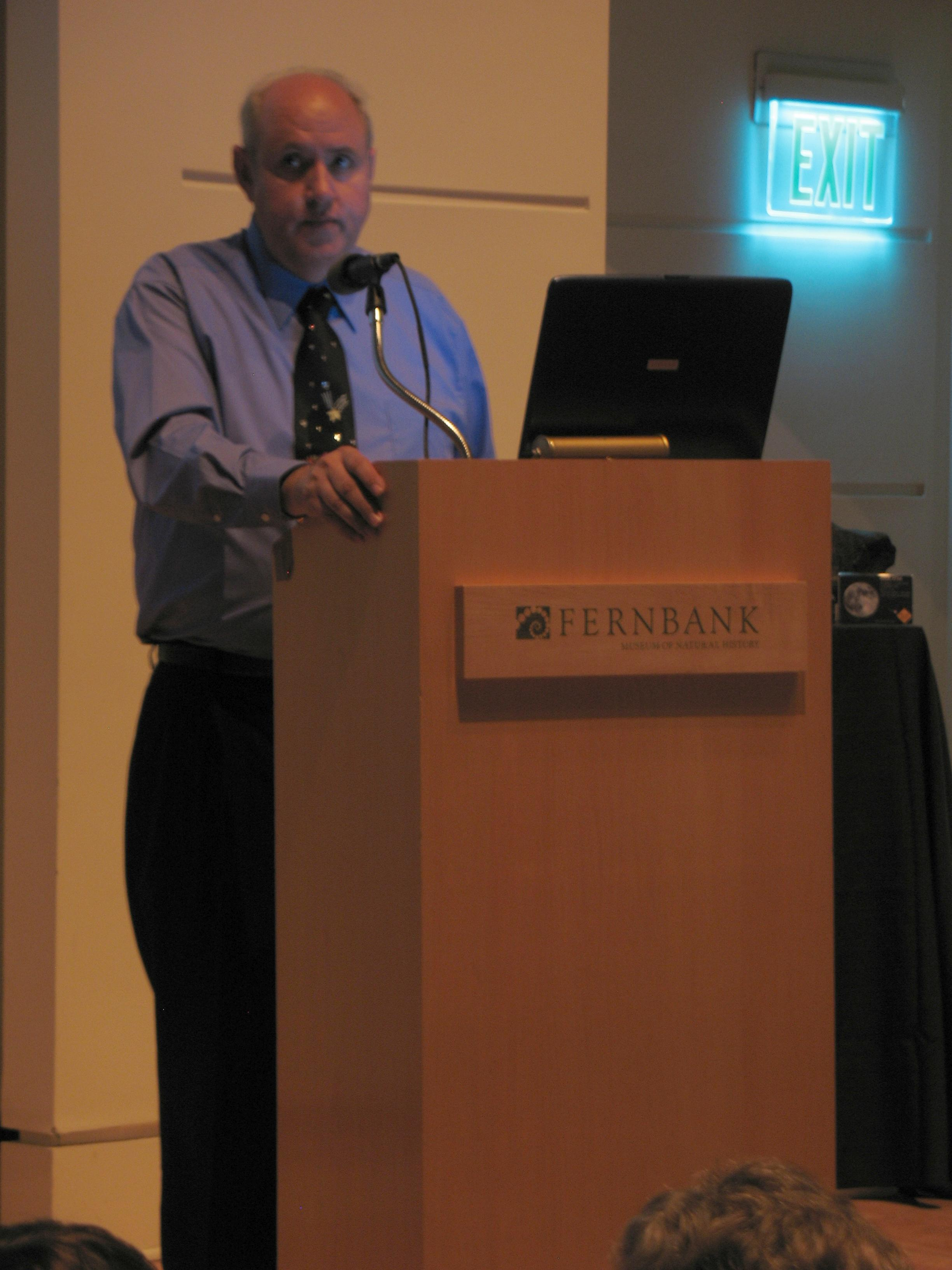
Thomas Bopp at Fernbank Museum of Natural History auditorium, 2010

After the discovery, Bopp was in demand on television and radio, and was invited to speak at conferences. One such appearance was on the children's science television show Bill Nye the Science Guy. On March 21, 1997, Hale and Bopp were named ABC Person of the Week in the Friday night broadcast. Bopp has said that "I thought that it would be a comet that would be mentioned in the back of some obscure textbook somewhere, but it's certainly not turned out to be that way." As Hale–Bopp became more visible, Bopp left his job and became a full-time speaker and educator. He enjoyed presenting in schools, science centers and museums, enthusing children with astronomy, and met up with his co-discoverer Hale in Queensland while taking a group of school children to see the 2012 eclipse in Australia. At White Sands Missile Range in 1997 Bopp was invited to be an observer when an ultraviolet spectrograph was launched by Black Brant rocket to observe the comet and look for argon and neon. Previously unobserved isotopes were discovered in addition to a third sodium tail. Bopp was awarded an honorary doctor of Science degree from Youngstown State University in 1998. Bopp and his father also became the first two members of the Friends of Ward Beecher Planetarium at the university.

In 1997, as comet Hale–Bopp reached its brightest point, Bopp's brother and sister-in-law were killed in a car accident after photographing the comet. "This has been the best week of my life. And the worst," Bopp told a National Geographic reporter.

Bopp and his father Frank have had an asteroid named after them, (7086) Bopp, discovered October 5, 1991, by Carolyn and Gene Shoemaker. In 1997, the Shoemakers, both famous for co-discovering comet Shoemaker–Levy 9, were involved in a car crash. Gene died in the crash, and his ashes were sent to the Moon along with an image of Comet Hale-Bopp, "the last comet that the Shoemakers observed together."

In 1997, when Bopp pointed out the comet would soon disappear from view and would not be visible for another 2380 years, he said he would always continue looking up at the stars.

I'll never give up looking at the skies. There are so many beautiful things there. And I love to share that with people.

He continued to volunteer at observatories near Phoenix, Arizona, towards the end of his life, speaking about Hale–Bopp. He died of liver failure on January 5, 2018, at the age of 68.
