= Messier 69 =

Globular cluster in the constellation Sagittarius

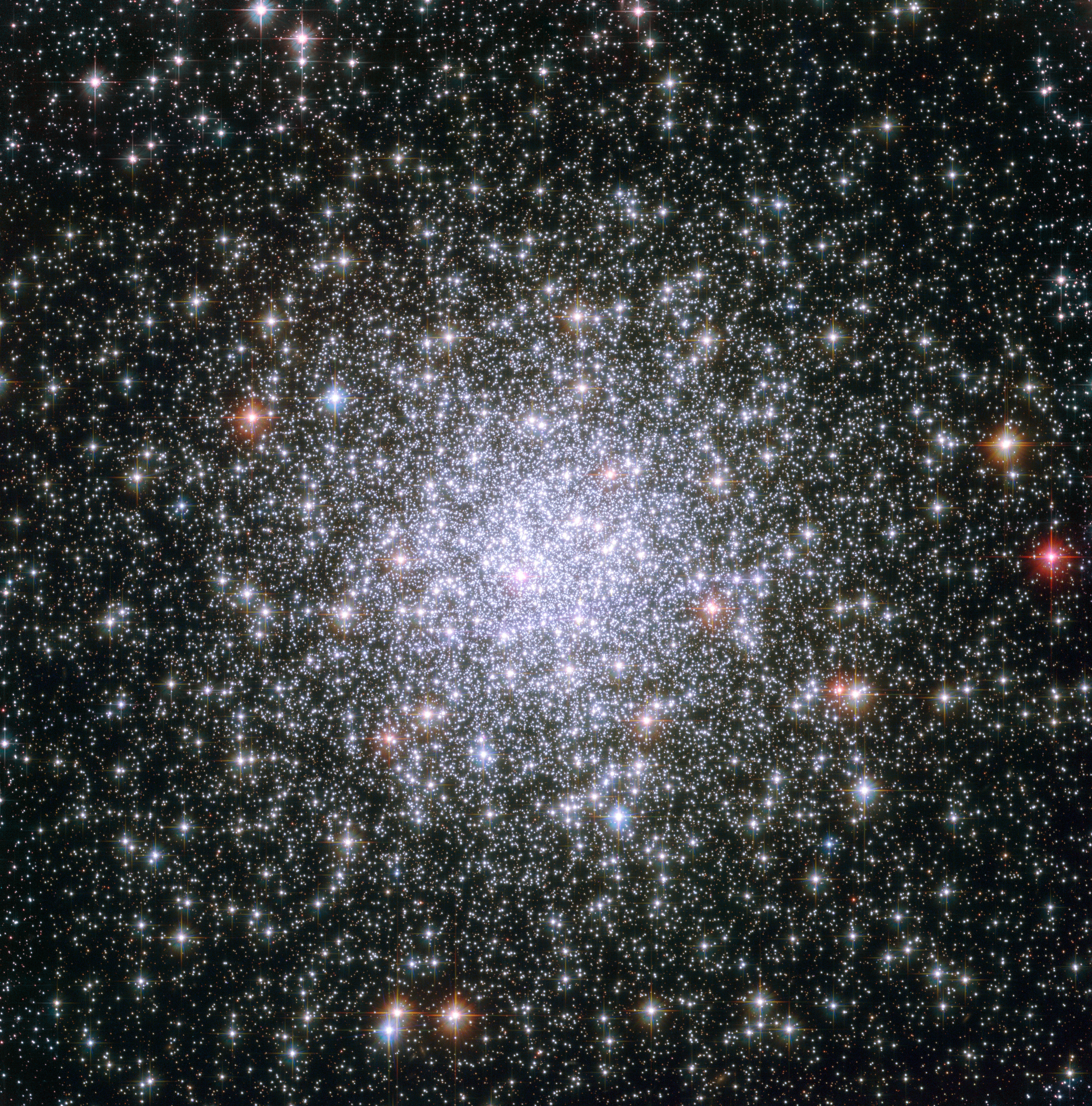
- Globular cluster Messier 69 by Hubble Space Telescope; 3.5′ view Credit: NASA/STScI/WikiSky

Observation data (J2000 epoch)
- Class: V
- Constellation: Sagittarius
- Right ascension: 18^{h} 31^{m} 23.10^{s}
- Declination: −32° 20′ 53.1″
- Distance: 29 kly (8.8 kpc)
- Apparent magnitude (V): 7.6
- Apparent dimensions (V): 10.8′

Physical characteristics
- Mass: 2.0×10^{5} M_{☉} M_{☉}
- Radius: 45 ly
- Tidal radius: 91.9 ly.
- Metallicity: [Fe/H] = –0.78 dex
- Estimated age: 13.06 Gyr
- Other designations: GCl 96, M69, NGC 6637,NGC 6634

Messier 69 or M69, also known NGC 6637, and NGC 6634, is a globular cluster in the southern constellation of Sagittarius. (Note: In daily rising of this globular cluster, whether in day- or nighttime, it will reach 15° above the due southern horizon, at the 90°−32°−15° parallel thus the 43rd parallel north, the furthest north for very detailed, easy observation for this object) It can be found 2.5° to the northeast of the star Epsilon Sagittarii and is dimly visible in 50 mm aperture binoculars. The cluster was discovered by Charles Messier on August 31, 1780, the same night he discovered M70. At the time, he was searching for an object described by Nicolas-Louis de Lacaille in 1751–2 and thought he had rediscovered it, but it is unclear if Lacaille actually described M69.

This cluster is about 28,700 light-years away from Earth and 5,200 ly from the Galactic Center, with a spatial radius of 45 light-years. It is a relatively metal-rich globular cluster that is a likely member of the galactic bulge population. It has a mass of 200000 M_{☉} with a half-mass radius of 11.6 ly, a core radius of 29.2 ly, and a tidal radius of 91.9 ly. Its center has a bright luminosity density of 6,460 L_{☉}·pc^{−3} (meaning per cubic parsec). It is a close neighbor of its analog M70 – possibly only 1,800 light-years separates the two.

== Gallery ==
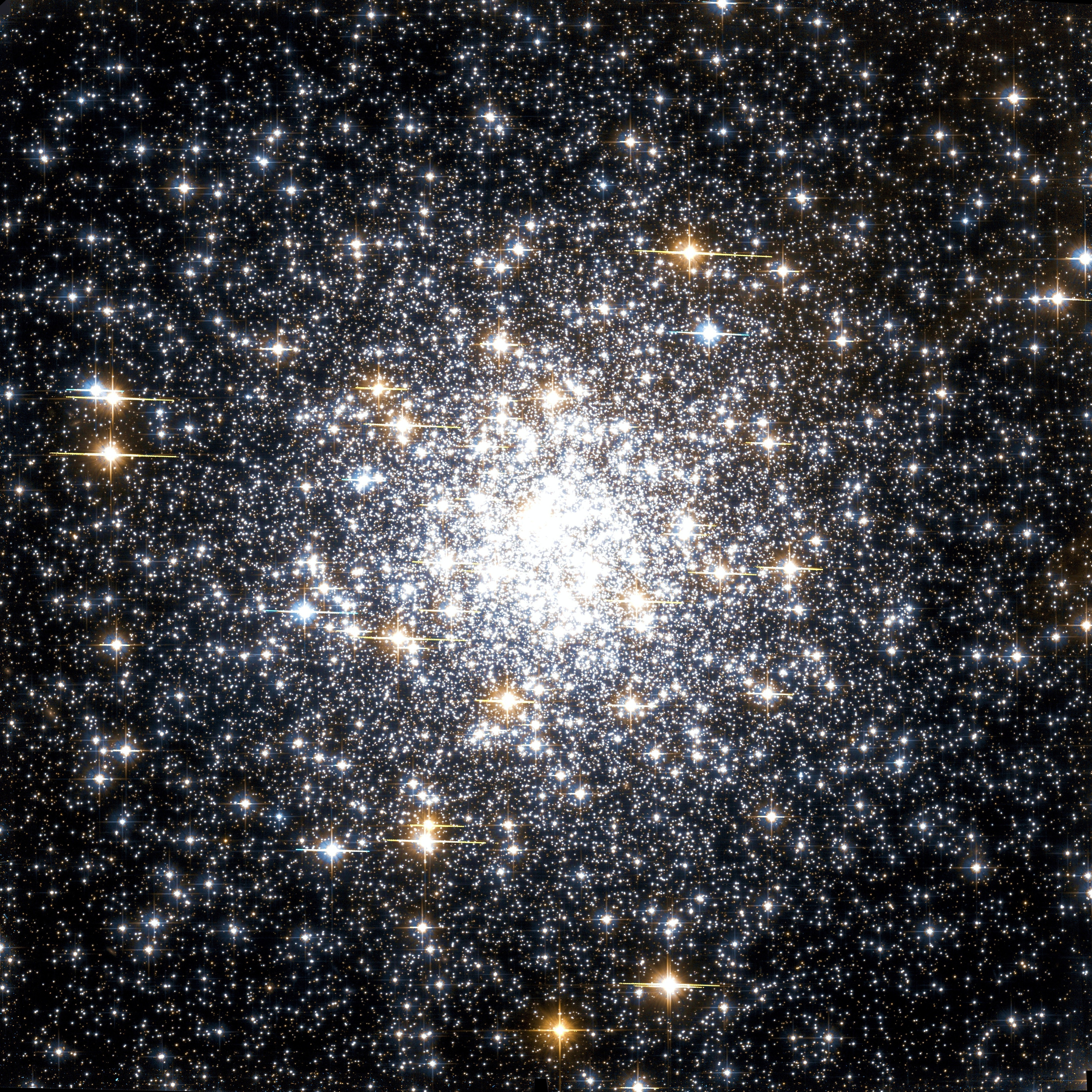
As globular clusters go, M69 is one of the most metal-rich on record.

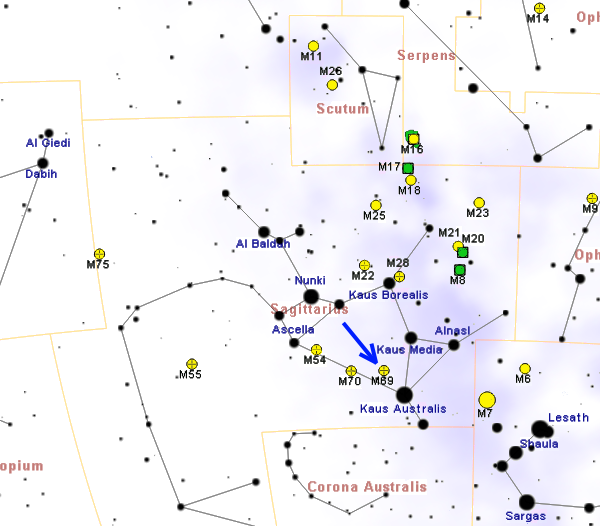
Map showing location of M69

== See also ==
- List of Messier objects
