= McGraw-Hill Encyclopedia of Science & Technology =

Encyclopedia published by McGraw-Hill

The McGraw-Hill Encyclopedia of Science & Technology is an English-language multivolume encyclopedia, specifically focused on scientific and technical subjects, and published by McGraw-Hill Education. The most recent edition in print is the eleventh edition, copyright 2012 (ISBN 9780071778343), comprising twenty volumes. The encyclopedia covers the life sciences and physical sciences, as well as engineering and technology topics.

There is also a one-volume McGraw-Hill Concise Encyclopedia of Science and Technology based on the full set. The sixth edition was published in May 2009 in twenty volumes including the "Index" (ISBN 9780071613668).

Further "Concise" editions for Chemistry or Engineering are available today.

The references work has been mentioned and reviewed too.
