= Alfa Romeo 85A =

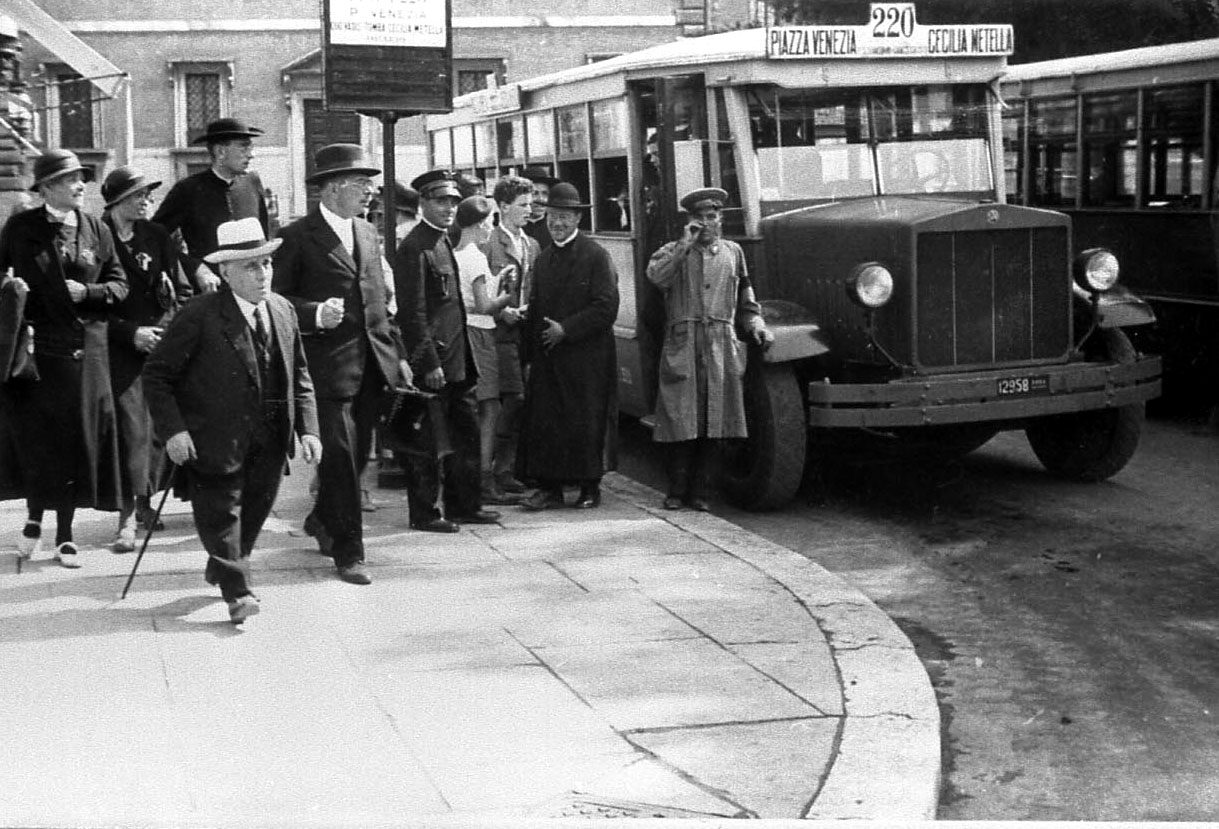
- Autobus Alfa Romeo 85-A in piazza Venezia (1933)

Dimensions
- Length: 10 m (390 in)

The Alfa Romeo 85A is an Italian bus produced by Alfa Romeo in small series in the beginning of the 1930s.

== History ==
The bus had a 6 cylinder Alfa Romeo engine A.R. F6M317 with 100 PS (74 kW; 99 hp). The body of the bus is based on body of Macchi.

== Production ==
Around 30 were produced in Italy.

== See also ==
- List of buses
