= Alfa Romeo 40A =

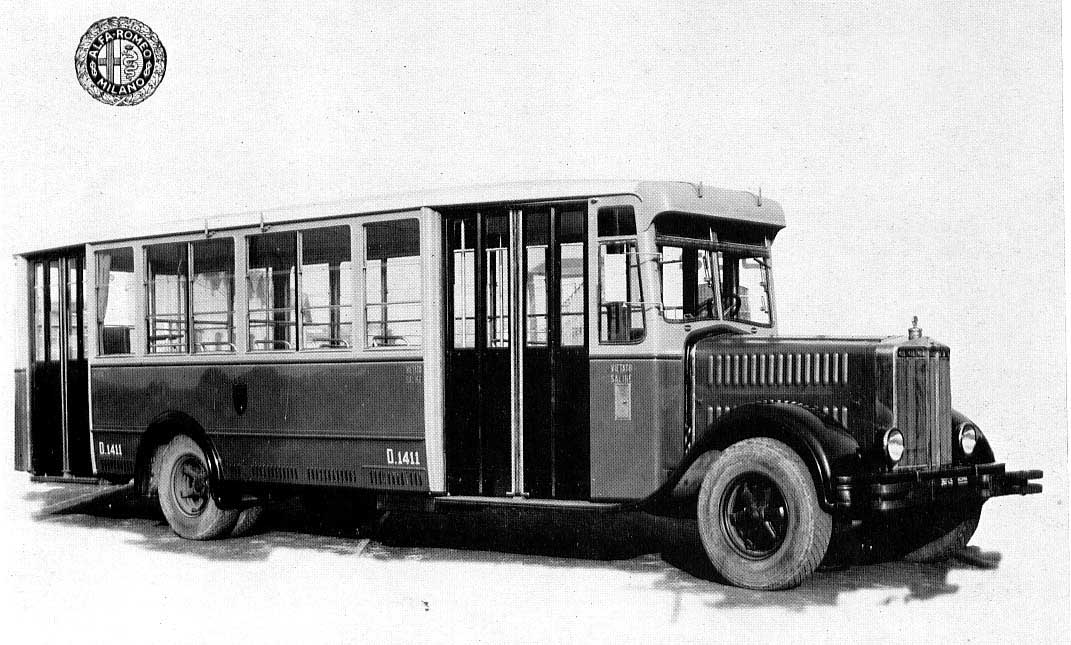

Alfa Romeo 40A is one of the first buses produced by the Italian company Alfa Romeo.

== Technical characteristics ==
The bus uses 4 cylinder engine with 45 horsepower. It has 2 wheelbases and places for 50 passengers (single version) and a double version for 70. The bus has 2 doors and 14 seats.

== History ==
The buses were constructed with partnership of other Italian vehicle companies. It uses a typical body for the buses in that time. The double version is with a load in the back.

== Transport ==
Used by:

- ATAC Rome
- ATM Milan

== See also ==
- List of buses
