= Comet Hale–Bopp =

Great Comet of 1997

C/1995 O1 (Hale–Bopp) (Great Comet of 1997)
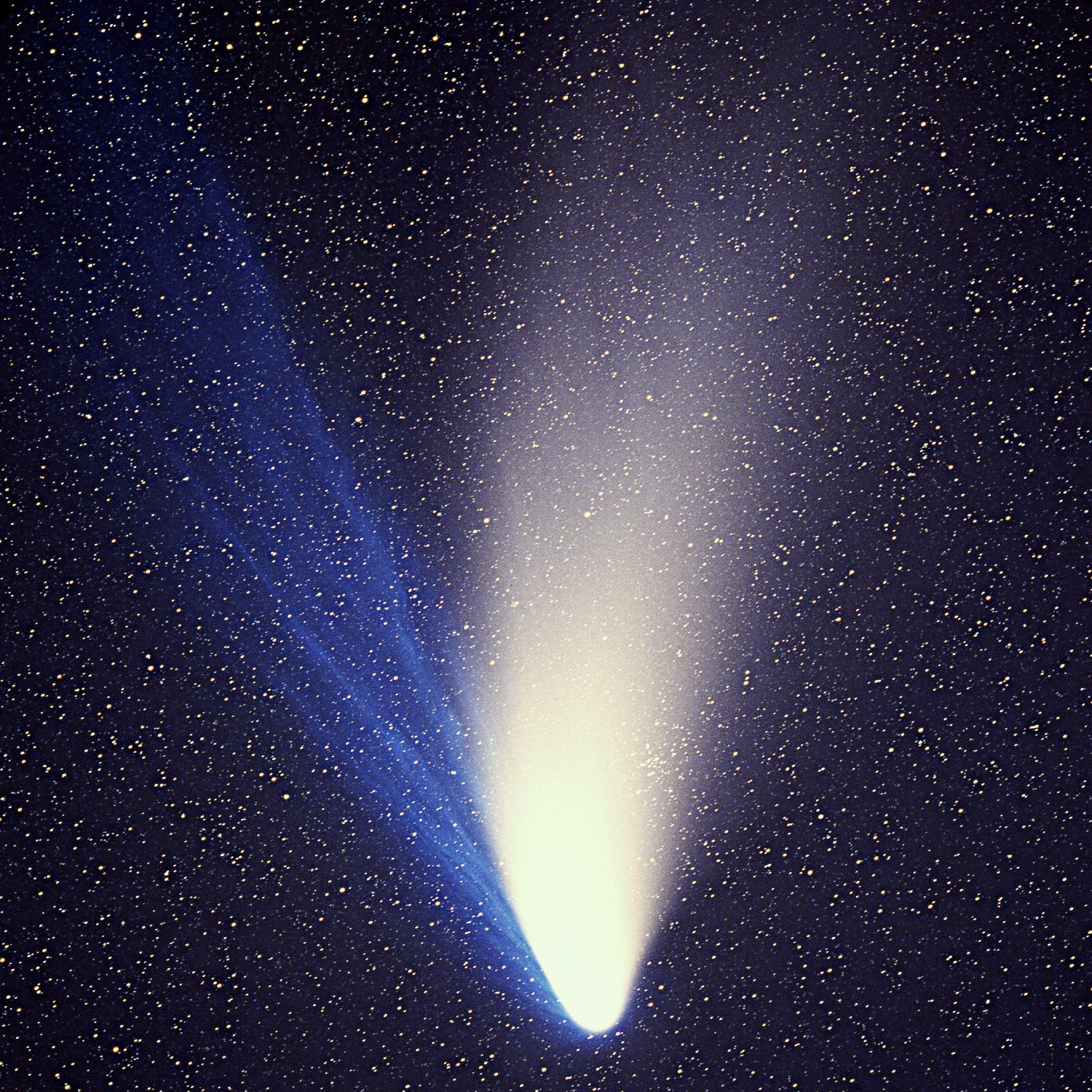
- Comet Hale–Bopp, shortly after passing perihelion on April 4, 1997; the gas tail is to the left and the dust tail to the right.

Discovery
- Discovered by: Alan Hale; Thomas Bopp
- Discovery site: United States
- Discovery date: July 23, 1995

Designations
- Pronunciation: /ˌheɪl ˈbɒp/
- Alternative designations: CJ95O010

Orbital characteristics
- Epoch: 15 September 2022 (JD 2459837.5)
- Observation arc: 29.2 years (Note: Observation arc from the Minor Planet Center database covering dates from 27 April 1993 until 9 July 2022.)
- Earliest precovery date: 27 April 1993
- Number of observations: 3,617
- Aphelion: 353.98 AU
- Perihelion: 0.914 AU
- Semi-major axis: 177.43 AU
- Eccentricity: 0.99498
- Orbital period: (Barycentric 2,399 yr); 2,364–2,520 yr
- Inclination: 89.288°
- Longitude of ascending node: 282.73°
- Argument of periapsis: 130.41°
- Last perihelion: April 1, 1997; 2215 BC
- Next perihelion: c. 4383–4387 AD
- T_{Jupiter}: 0.044
- Earth MOID: 0.088 AU
- Jupiter MOID: 0.079 AU

Physical characteristics
- Mean diameter: 60 ± 20 km (37 ± 12 mi)
- Mean radius: 30 ± 10 km (18.6 ± 6.2 mi)
- Mass: 1.9×10^{14} kg
- Synodic rotation period: 11.35±0.04 hours
- Geometric albedo: 0.01–0.07
- Comet total magnitude (M1): −1.3
- Apparent magnitude: −1.8 (1997 apparition)

Comet Hale–Bopp (formally designated C/1995 O1) is a long-period comet that was one of the most widely observed of the 20th century and one of the brightest seen for many decades.

Alan Hale and Thomas Bopp discovered Comet Hale–Bopp separately on July 23, 1995, before it became visible to the naked eye. It is difficult to predict the maximum brightness of new comets with any degree of certainty, but Hale–Bopp exceeded most predictions when it passed perihelion on April 1, 1997, reaching about magnitude −1.8. Its massive nucleus size made it visible to the naked eye for a record 18 months. This is twice as long as the Great Comet of 1811, the previous record holder. Accordingly, Hale–Bopp was dubbed the Great Comet of 1997.

== Discovery ==
The comet was discovered independently on July 23, 1995, by two observers, Alan Hale and Thomas Bopp, both in the United States.

Hale had spent many hundreds of hours searching for comets without success, and was tracking known comets from his driveway in New Mexico when he chanced upon Hale–Bopp just after midnight. The comet had an apparent magnitude of 10.5 and lay near the globular cluster M70 in the constellation of Sagittarius. Hale first established that there was no other deep-sky object near M70, and then consulted a directory of known comets, finding that none were known to be in this area of the sky. Once he had established that the object was moving relative to the background stars, he emailed the Central Bureau for Astronomical Telegrams, the clearing house for astronomical discoveries, at around 6:50 UT, shortly after his observations.

Bopp did not own a telescope. He was out with friends at Vekol Ranch, about 140 kilometres (90 miles) south of Phoenix (near Stanfield), observing star clusters and galaxies when he chanced across the comet while at the eyepiece of a homemade 44 cm (17.5 in) Dobsonian telescope owned by his friend Jim Stevens. He realized he might have spotted something new when, like Hale, he checked his star maps to determine if any other deep-sky objects were known to be near M70, and found none. He alerted the Central Bureau for Astronomical Telegrams about two hours after Hale through a Western Union telegram. Brian G. Marsden, who had run the bureau since 1968, laughed, "Nobody sends telegrams anymore. I mean, by the time that telegram got here, Alan Hale had already e-mailed us three times with updated coordinates."

The following morning, it was confirmed that this was a new comet, and it was given the designation C/1995 O1. The discovery was announced in International Astronomical Union circular 6187.

== Early observation ==
Hale–Bopp's orbital position was calculated as 7.2 astronomical units (AU) from the Sun, placing it between Jupiter and Saturn and by far the greatest distance from Earth at which a comet had been discovered by amateurs. Most comets at this distance are extremely faint, and show no discernible activity, but Hale–Bopp already had an observable coma. A precovery image taken at the UK Schmidt Telescope in 1993 was found to show the then-unnoticed comet some 13 AU (1.9×10^{9} km or 1.2 billion miles) from the Sun, a distance at which most comets are essentially unobservable (e.g., Halley's Comet was more than 100 times fainter at the same distance from the Sun). Analysis indicated later that its comet nucleus was 60 ± 20 km (37 ± 12 miles) in diameter, approximately six times the size of Halley's Comet.

Its great distance and surprising activity indicated that comet Hale–Bopp might become very bright when it reached perihelion in 1997. However, comet scientists were wary—comets can be extremely unpredictable, and many have large outbursts at great distances only to diminish in brightness later. Comet Kohoutek in 1973 had been touted as a "comet of the century" and turned out to be unspectacular.

== Perihelion ==
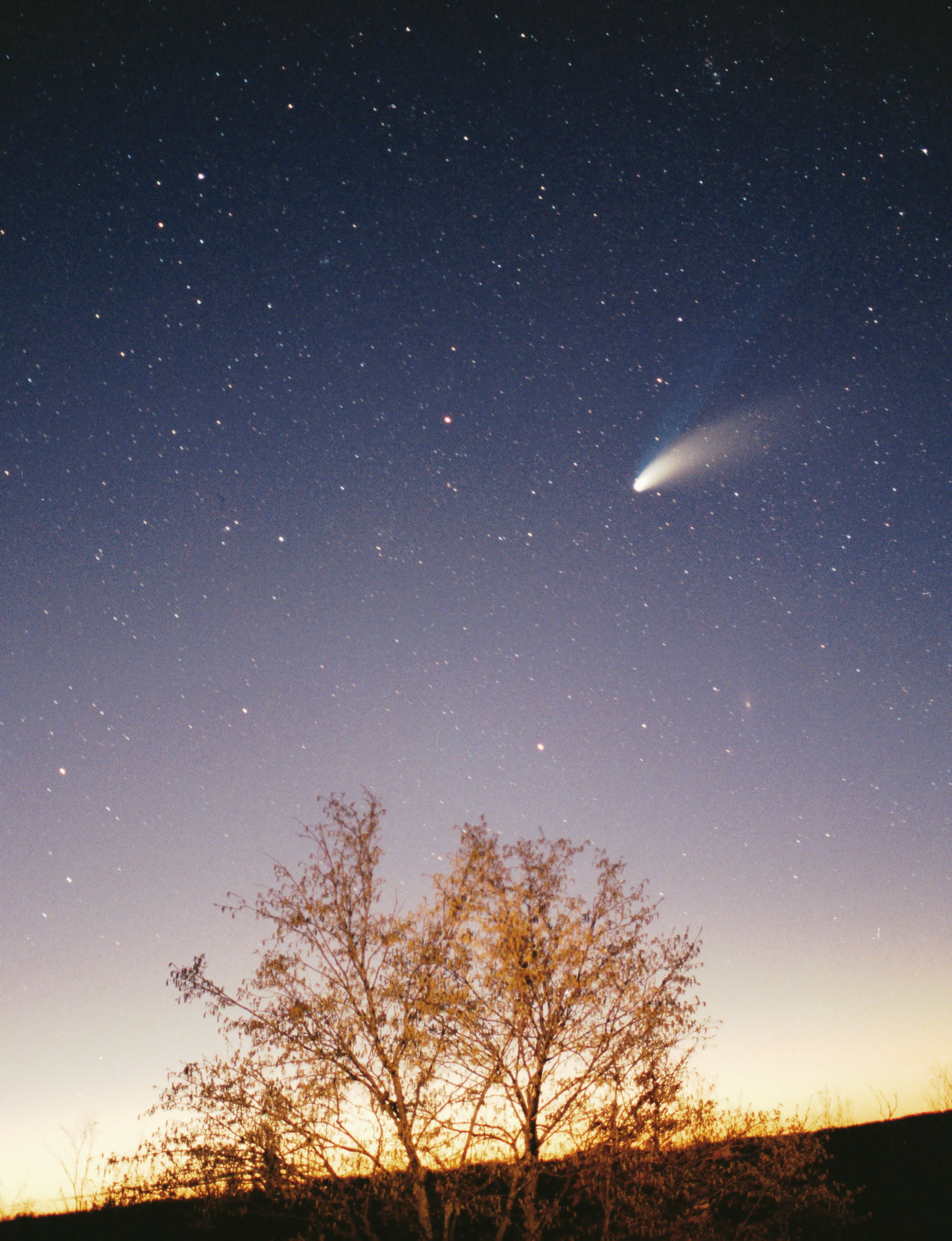
The comet became a spectacular sight in early 1997.

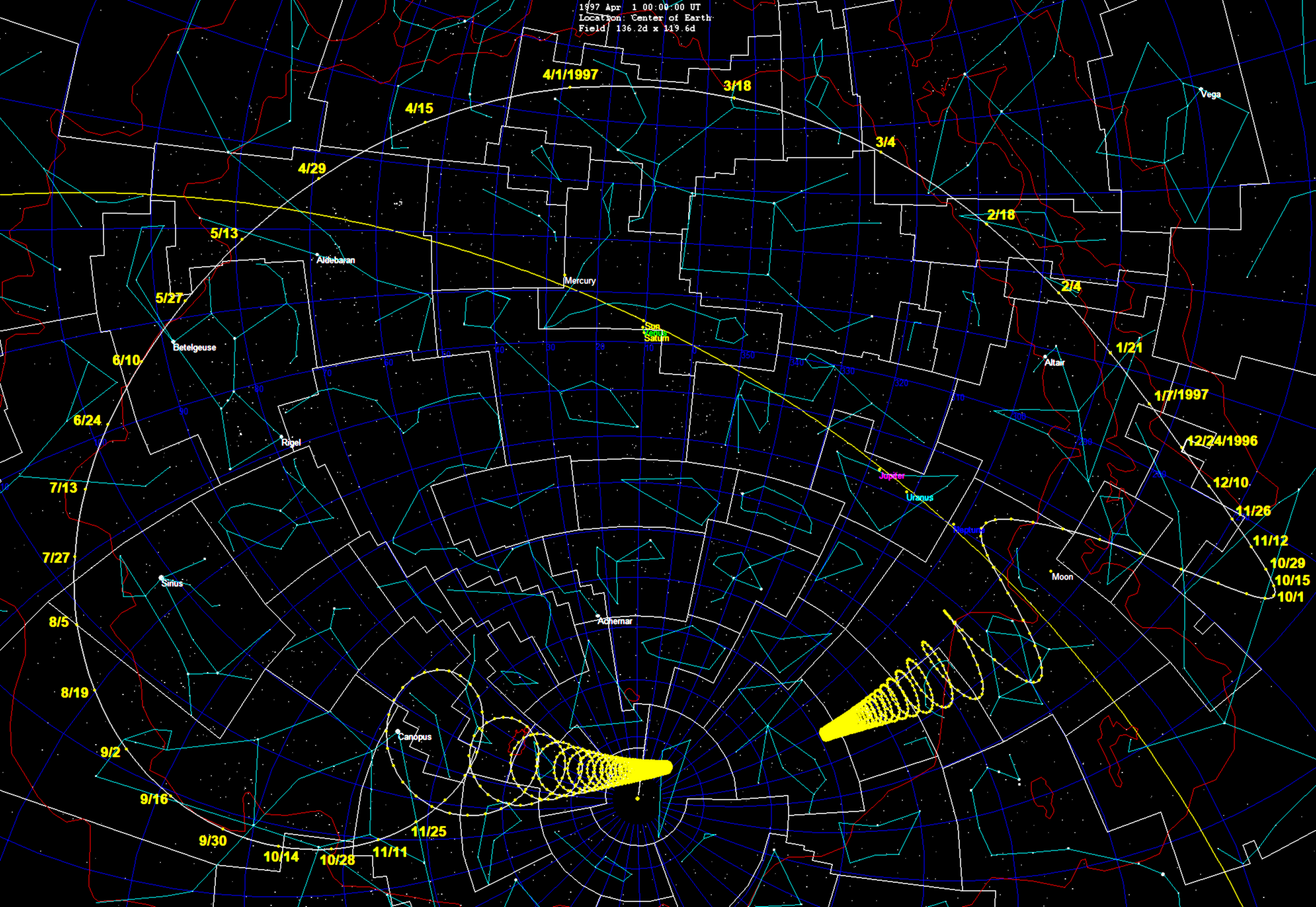
Star map of path with 14-day motion marked

Hale–Bopp became visible to the naked eye in May 1996, and although its rate of brightening slowed considerably during the latter half of that year, scientists were still cautiously optimistic that it would become very bright. It was too closely aligned with the Sun to be observable during December 1996, but when it reappeared in January 1997, it was already bright enough to be seen by anyone who looked for it, even from large cities with light-polluted skies.

The internet was a growing phenomenon at the time, and numerous websites that tracked the comet's progress and provided daily images from around the world became extremely popular. The Internet played a large role in encouraging the unprecedented public interest in comet Hale–Bopp.

As the comet approached the Sun, it continued to brighten, shining at 2nd magnitude in February, and showing a growing pair of tails, the blue gas tail pointing straight away from the Sun and the yellowish dust tail curving away along its orbit. On March 9, a solar eclipse in China, Mongolia and eastern Siberia allowed observers there to see the comet in the daytime. Hale–Bopp had its closest approach to Earth on March 22, 1997, at a distance of 1.315 AU (196.72 million km; 122.24 million mi).

As it passed perihelion on April 1, 1997, the comet developed into a spectacular sight. It shone brighter than any star in the night sky except Sirius, and its dust tail stretched 40–45 degrees across the sky. The comet was visible well before the sky got fully dark each night, and while many great comets are very close to the Sun as they pass perihelion, Comet Hale–Bopp was visible all night to Northern Hemisphere observers. The next time the Northern Hemisphere observed a comet similarly as bright was Comet Tsuchinshan–ATLAS in October 2024.

== After perihelion ==
After its perihelion passage, the comet moved into the southern celestial hemisphere. While Comet Hale–Bopp reached perihelion on April 1, 1997, it achieved its maximum visual brightness between April 2 and April 4, 1997. During this window, the comet reached a peak apparent magnitude of roughly −1.8, making it the brightest object in the night sky other than Sirius. This period of maximum brilliance occurred slightly after perihelion due to a "solar heating lag," where the intensified heat from its closest solar approach continued to maximize the outgassing of its dust and ion tails. At this peak, the comet's dust tail stretched significantly across the sky and remained visible to the naked eye even in light-polluted urban areas.

Inhabitants of the Southern Hemisphere could see the comet gradually fade from view during the second half of 1997. The last naked-eye observations were reported in December 1997, which meant that the comet had remained visible without aid for 569 days, or about 18 1/2 months. The previous record had been set by the Great Comet of 1811, which was visible to the naked eye for about nine months.

The comet continued to fade as it receded, but was still tracked by astronomers. In October 2007, ten years after the perihelion and at a distance of 25.7 AU from the Sun, the comet was still active as indicated by the detection of the CO-driven coma. Herschel Space Observatory images taken in 2010 suggest comet Hale–Bopp is covered in a fresh frost layer. Hale–Bopp was again detected in December 2010 when it was 30.7 AU away from the Sun, and in 2012, at 33.2 AU from the Sun. The James Webb Space Telescope observed Hale–Bopp in 2022, when it was 46.2 AU from the Sun.

== Orbital changes ==
Hale–Bopp at perihelion on April 1, 1997

Animation of Hale–Bopp orbit

Polar view

Equatorial view

- Hale–Bopp
- Mercury
- Venus
- Earth
- Mars
- Jupiter

The comet likely made its previous perihelion approximately 4,200 years ago, roughly the year 2215 BC. The estimated closest approach to Earth was 1.4 AU, and it may have been observed in ancient Egypt during the 6th-dynasty reign of the Pharaoh Pepi II (r. 2247 – c. 2216 BC). Pepi's pyramid at Saqqara contains a text referring to an "nhh-star" as a companion of the pharaoh in the heavens, where "nhh" is the hieroglyph for long hair.

Hale–Bopp may have had a near collision with Jupiter in 2215 BC, which probably caused a dramatic change in its orbit, and 2215 BC may have been its first passage through the inner Solar System from the Oort cloud. The comet's current orbit is almost perpendicular to the plane of the ecliptic, so further close approaches to planets will be rare. However, in April 1996 the comet passed within 0.77 AU (115 million km) of Jupiter, close enough for its orbit to be measurably affected by the planet's gravity. The comet's orbit was shortened considerably to a period of roughly 2,399 years, and its next return to the inner Solar System will be around the year 4385. Its greatest distance from the Sun (aphelion) will be about 354 AU, reduced from about 525 AU.

The estimated probability of Hale–Bopp's striking Earth in future passages through the inner Solar System is remote, about 2.5 × 10^{−9} per orbit. However, given that the comet nucleus is around 60 km (37 mi) in diameter, the consequences of such an impact would be apocalyptic. Weissman conservatively estimates the diameter at 35 km (22 mi); an estimated density of 0.6 g/cm^{3} then gives a cometary mass of 1.3 × 10^{19} g. At a probable impact velocity of 52.5 km/s, impact energy can be calculated as 1.9 × 10^{32} ergs, or 4.4 × 10^{9} megatons, about 44 times the estimated energy of the K–T impact event.

Over many orbits, the cumulative effect of gravitational perturbations on comets with high orbital inclinations and small perihelion distances is generally to reduce the perihelion distance to very small values. Hale–Bopp has about a 15% chance of eventually becoming a sungrazing comet through this process.

== Scientific results ==
Due to the massive size of its nucleus, Comet Hale–Bopp was observed intensively by astronomers during its perihelion passage, and several important advances in cometary science resulted from these observations. The dust production rate of the comet was very high (up to 2.0×10^{6} kg/s), which may have made the inner coma optically thick. Based on the properties of the dust grains—high temperature, high albedo and strong 10 μm silicate emission feature—the astronomers concluded the dust grains are smaller than observed in any other comet.

Hale–Bopp showed the highest-ever linear polarization detected for any comet. Such polarization is the result of solar radiation getting scattered by the dust particles in the coma of the comet and depends on the nature of the grains. It further confirms that the dust grains in the coma of comet Hale–Bopp were smaller than inferred in any other comet.

=== Sodium tail ===
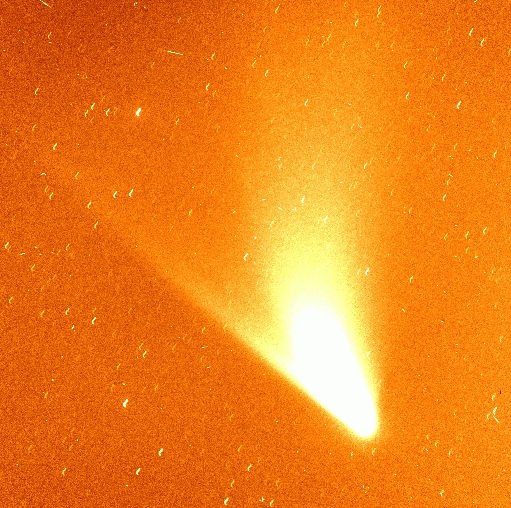
Comet Hale–Bopp's neutral sodium tail (the straight tail extending up to the left from the nucleus)

One of the most remarkable discoveries was that the comet had a third type of tail. In addition to the well-known gas and dust tails, Hale–Bopp also exhibited a faint sodium tail, only visible with powerful instruments with dedicated filters. Sodium emission had been previously observed in other comets, but had not been shown to come from a tail. Hale–Bopp's sodium tail consisted of neutral atoms (not ions), and extended to some 0.33 AU (49 million km; 31 million mi) in length.

The source of the sodium appeared to be the inner coma, although not necessarily the nucleus. There are several possible mechanisms for generating a source of sodium atoms, including collisions between dust grains surrounding the nucleus, and "sputtering" of sodium from dust grains by ultraviolet light. It is not yet established which mechanism is primarily responsible for creating Hale–Bopp's sodium tail, and the narrow and diffuse components of the tail may have different origins.

While the comet's dust tail roughly followed the path of the comet's orbit and the gas tail pointed almost directly away from the Sun, the sodium tail appeared to lie between the two. This implies that the sodium atoms are driven away from the comet's head by radiation pressure.

=== Deuterium abundance ===
The abundance of deuterium in comet Hale–Bopp in the form of heavy water was found to be about twice that of Earth's oceans. If Hale–Bopp's deuterium abundance is typical of all comets, this implies that although cometary impacts are thought to be the source of a significant amount of the water on Earth, they cannot be the only source.

Deuterium was also detected in many other hydrogen compounds in the comet. The ratio of deuterium to normal hydrogen was found to vary from compound to compound, which astronomers believe suggests that cometary ices were formed in interstellar clouds, rather than in the solar nebula. Theoretical modelling of ice formation in interstellar clouds suggests that comet Hale–Bopp formed at temperatures of around 25–45 kelvin (−414 to −387 degrees Fahrenheit, −248 to −233 degrees Celsius).

=== Organics ===
Spectroscopic observations of Hale–Bopp revealed the presence of many organic chemicals, several of which had never been detected in comets before. These complex molecules may exist within the cometary nucleus, or might be synthesised by reactions in the comet.

=== Detection of argon ===
Hale–Bopp was the first comet where the noble gas argon was detected. Noble gases are chemically inert and vary from low to high volatility. Since different noble elements have different sublimation temperatures, and do not interact with other elements, they can be used for probing the temperature histories of the cometary ices. Krypton has a sublimation temperature of 16–20 K (−430 to −423 degrees Fahrenheit, −257 to −253 degrees Celsius) and was found to be depleted more than 25 times relative to the solar abundance, while argon with its higher sublimation temperature was enriched relative to the solar abundance. Together these observations indicate that the interior of Hale–Bopp has always been colder than 35–40 K (−396 to −387 degrees Fahrenheit, −238 to −233 degrees Celsius), but has at some point been warmer than 20 K (−423 degrees Fahrenheit, −253 degrees Celsius). Unless the solar nebula was much colder and richer in argon than generally believed, this suggests that the comet formed beyond Neptune in the Kuiper belt region and then migrated outward to the Oort Cloud.

=== Rotation ===
Comet Hale–Bopp's activity and outgassing were not spread uniformly over its nucleus, but instead came from several specific jets. Observations of the material streaming away from these jets allowed astronomers to measure the rotation period of the comet, which was found to be about 11 hours 46 minutes.

=== Binary nucleus question ===
In 1997 a paper was published that hypothesised the existence of a binary nucleus to fully explain the observed pattern of comet Hale–Bopp's dust emission observed in October 1995. The paper was based on theoretical analysis, and did not claim an observational detection of the proposed satellite nucleus, but estimated that it would have a diameter of about 30 km (19 mi), with the main nucleus being about 70 km (43 mi) across, and would orbit in about three days at a distance of about 180 km (110 mi). This analysis was confirmed by observations in 1996 using Wide-Field Planetary Camera 2 of the Hubble Space Telescope which had taken images of the comet that revealed the satellite.

Although observations using adaptive optics in late 1997 and early 1998 showed a double peak in the brightness of the nucleus, controversy still exists over whether such observations can only be explained by a binary nucleus. The discovery of the satellite was not confirmed by other observations. Also, while comets have been observed to break up before, no case had been found of a stable binary nucleus until the subsequent discovery of the cometary nature of P/2006 VW_{139} in 2016.

== UFO claims ==
In November 1996, amateur astronomer Chuck Shramek of Houston, Texas, took a CCD image of the comet which showed a fuzzy, slightly elongated object nearby. His computer sky-viewing program did not identify the star, so Shramek called the Art Bell radio program Coast to Coast AM to announce that he had discovered a "Saturn-like object" following Hale–Bopp. UFO enthusiasts, such as remote viewing proponent and Emory University political science professor Courtney Brown, soon concluded that there was an alien spacecraft following the comet.

Alan Hale responded to the claim by announcing that the object was simply an 8th-magnitude star in the background. They noted that the star did not appear on Shramek's computer program because the user preferences were set incorrectly. Art Bell claimed to have obtained an image of the object from an anonymous astrophysicist who was about to confirm its discovery. However, astronomers Olivier Hainaut and David Tholen of the University of Hawaii stated that the alleged photo was an altered copy of one of their own comet images.

Thirty-nine members of the Heaven's Gate cult died in a mass suicide, in March 1997 with the intention of teleporting to a spaceship which they believed was flying behind the comet.

Nancy Lieder, who claims to receive messages from aliens through an implant in her brain, stated that Hale–Bopp was a fiction designed to distract the population from the coming arrival of "Nibiru" or "Planet X", a fictional giant planet whose close passage would disrupt the Earth's rotation, causing global cataclysm. Her original date for the apocalypse was May 2003, which passed without incident, but various conspiracy websites continued to predict the coming of Nibiru, most of whom tied it to the 2012 phenomenon. Lieder and others' claims of the planet Nibiru have been repeatedly debunked by scientists.

== Legacy ==
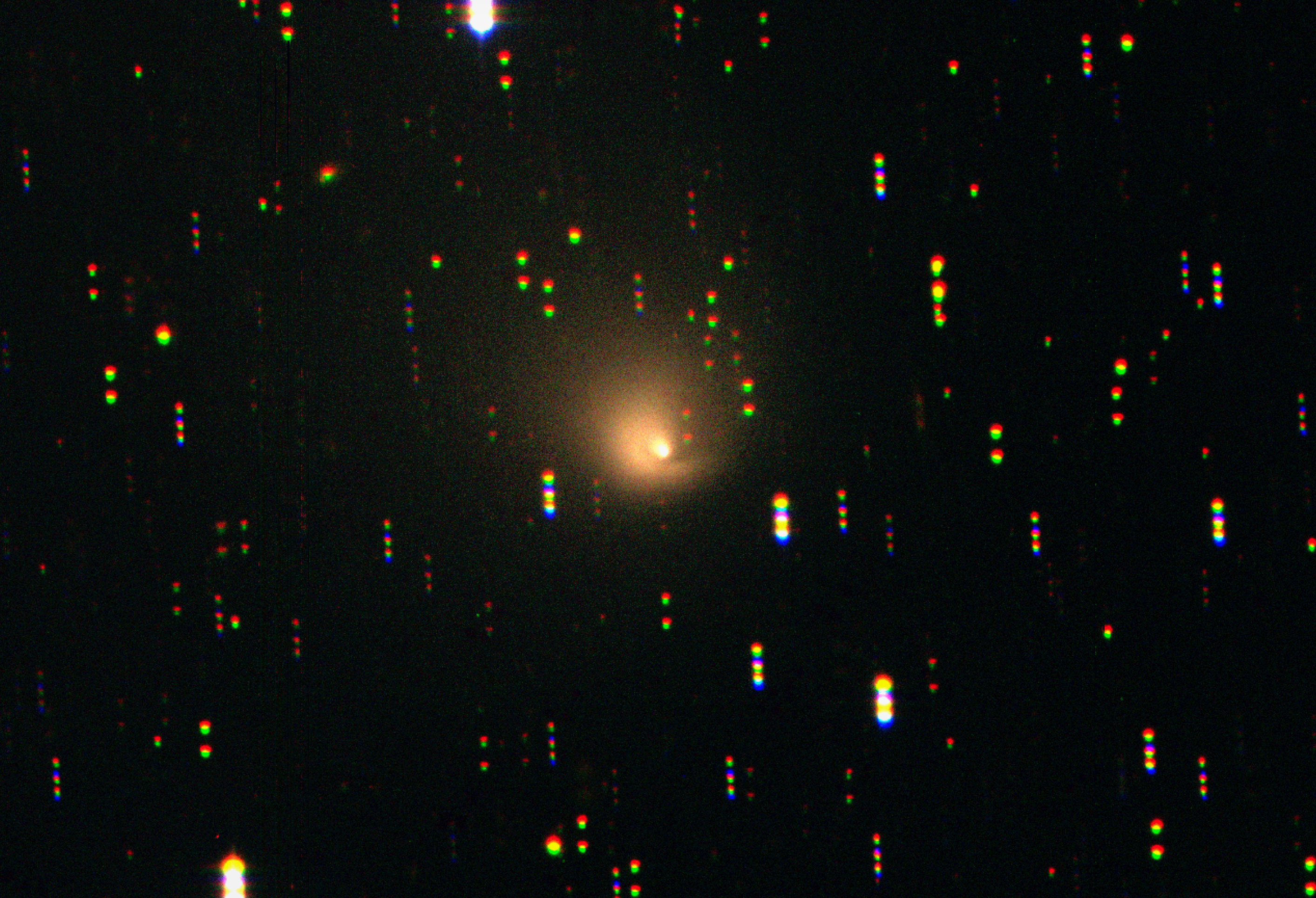
Comet Hale–Bopp in 2001, at a distance of nearly 2.0 billion km (1.2 billion mi) from the Sun.

Its lengthy period of visibility and extensive coverage in the media meant that Hale–Bopp was probably the most-observed comet in history, making a far greater impact on the general public than the return of Halley's Comet in 1986, and certainly seen by a greater number of people than witnessed any of Halley's previous appearances. For instance, 69% of Americans had seen Hale–Bopp by April 9, 1997.

Hale–Bopp was a record-breaking comet—the farthest comet from the Sun discovered by amateurs, with the largest well-measured cometary nucleus known after 95P/Chiron, and it was visible to the naked eye for twice as long as the previous record-holder. It was also brighter than magnitude 0 for eight weeks, longer than any other recorded comet.

Carolyn Shoemaker and her husband Gene, co-discoverers of comet Shoemaker–Levy 9, were involved in a car crash after photographing the comet. Gene died in the crash and his ashes were sent to the Moon aboard NASA's Lunar Prospector mission along with an image of Hale–Bopp, "the last comet that the Shoemakers observed together".

Composer Dmitry Kayukin created the music album Comet 97 based on his memories of observing Comet Hale–Bopp.

== See also ==
- Comet Hyakutake
- Hale Bopp (Waterhouse), a 1997 string orchestra composition
- Century Rolls (Adams), a 1997 piano concerto
- Lists of comets
