= Messier 70 =

Globular cluster in the constellation Sagittarius

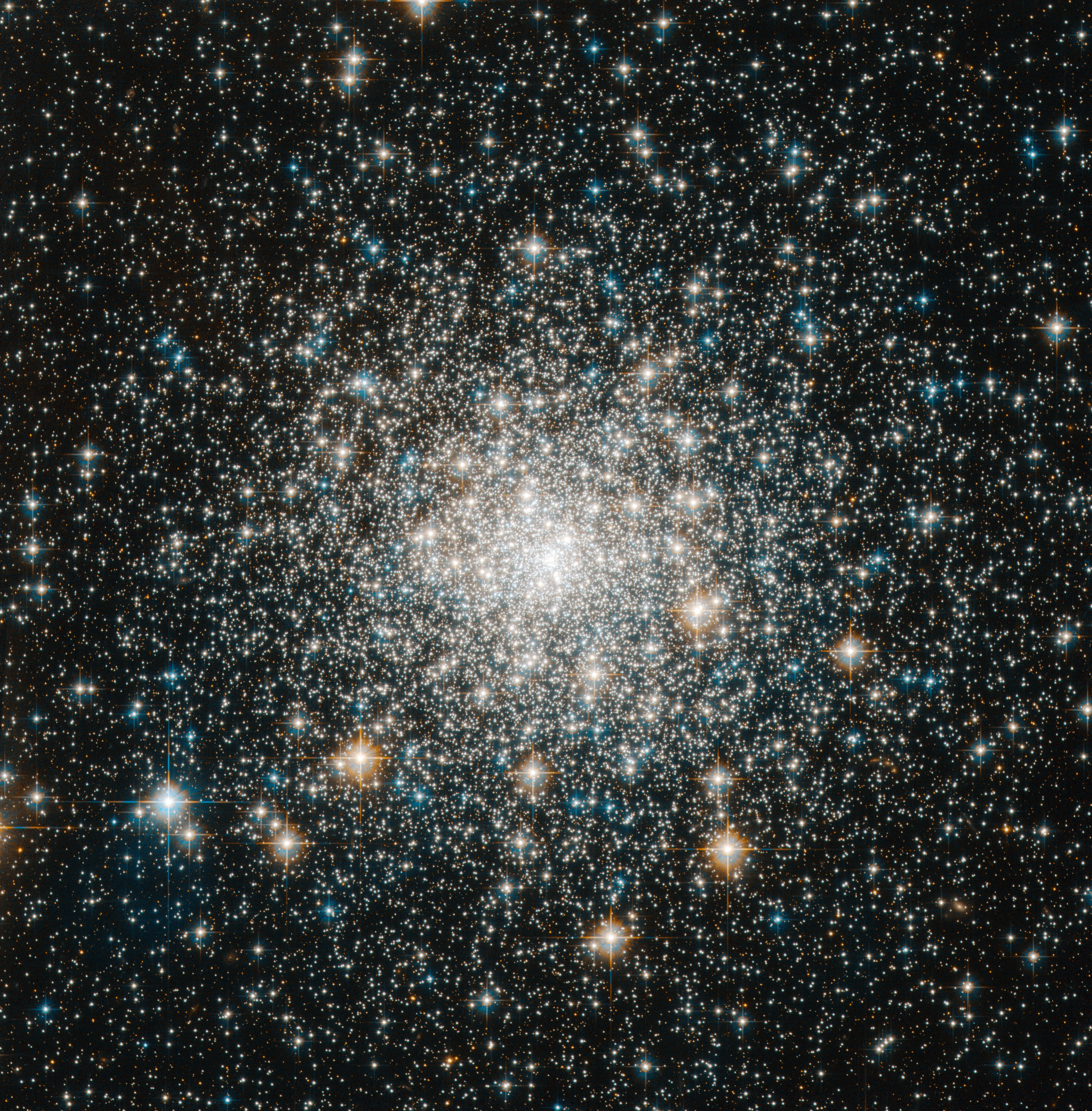
- Globular cluster Messier 70 by Hubble Space Telescope; 3.3′ view

Observation data (J2000 epoch)
- Class: V
- Constellation: Sagittarius
- Right ascension: 18^{h} 43^{m} 12.76^{s}
- Declination: –32° 17′ 31.6″
- Distance: 29.4 kly (9.0 kpc)
- Apparent magnitude (V): 7.9
- Apparent dimensions (V): 8.0′

Physical characteristics
- Mass: 1.79×10^{5} M_{☉}
- Radius: 34 ly
- Tidal radius: 11.2′
- Metallicity: [Fe/H] = –1.35 dex
- Estimated age: 12.80 Gyr
- Other designations: GCl 101, M70, NGC 6681

Messier 70 or M70, also known as NGC 6681, is a globular cluster of stars to be found in the south of Sagittarius. (Note: On the southernmost line of the main (teapot) asterism; its declination means it will not rise (above the horizon) above the 58th parallel north and will need the observer to be as much as a further fifteen degrees of latitude south for detailed, little distorted observation) It was discovered by Charles Messier in 1780. (Note: on 31 August) The famous comet Hale–Bopp was discovered near this cluster in 1995. (Note: on 23 July)

It is about 29,400 light years away from Earth and around 6,500 light-years from the Galactic Center. It is roughly the same size and luminosity as its neighbour in space, M69. M70 has a very small core radius of 0.22 ly (0.068 pc) and a half-light radius of 182.0 ly (55.80 pc). This cluster has undergone core collapse, leaving it centrally concentrated with the luminosity distribution following a power law.

There are two distinct stellar populations in the cluster, with each displaying unique abundances. These likely represent different generations of stars. Five known variable stars lie within its broadest radius, the tidal radius, all of which are RR Lyrae variables. The cluster may have two blue stragglers near the core.

== Gallery ==
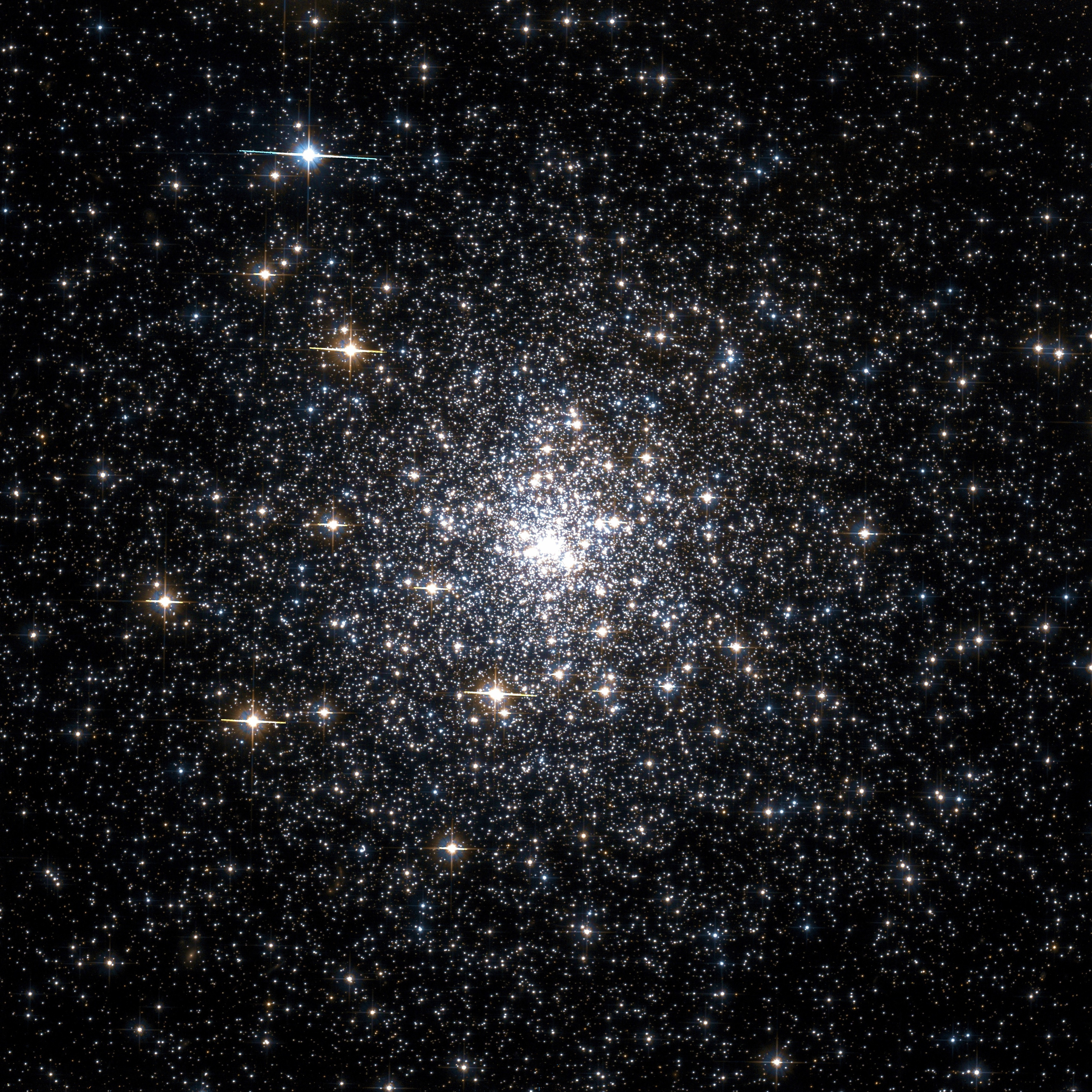
Image by Hubble Space Telescope

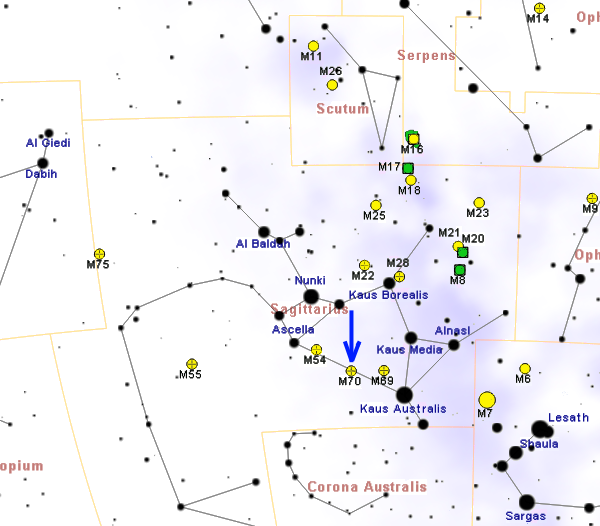
Map showing M70, against a conventional (southern) horizon

== See also ==
- List of Messier objects
