= Horizon High School (Colorado) =

Location
- 5321 East 136th Avenue; Thornton, Colorado 80602; United States; 39°56′39″N 104°55′33″W

Information
- Established: 1988 (38 years ago)
- School district: Adams 12 Five Star Schools
- CEEB code: 060144
- Principal: William Shaw
- Staff: 229
- Faculty: 97.58 (FTE)
- Grades: 9-12
- Student to teacher ratio: 20.15
- Campus type: Suburban
- Colors: Maroon and silver
- Athletics: 5A
- Athletics conference: Front Range League
- Mascot: Hawk
- Rivals: Legacy High School
- Feeder schools: Rocky Top Middle School; Shadow Ridge Middle School; Century Middle School
- Website: horizon.adams12.org

Horizon High School is a public secondary institution located in Thornton, Colorado.

== History ==
Horizon High School opened in 1988 to relieve crowding at Northglenn High School.

Following rapid growth in Adams County throughout the 1990s, Horizon High School quickly filled to capacity, and by 1999 the campus had 20 portable classrooms outside the school's main building.

Originally, the school only had grades 10-12. The graduating class of 1998 was the first freshman class to attend the school.

== Athletics ==
Horizon High School fields teams that compete in interscholastic competition in baseball, basketball, cross-country, football, golf, gymnastics, soccer, softball, swimming, diving, tennis, track and field, volleyball and wrestling.

State championship titles:

- Boys' basketball: 1998 (5A)
- Girls' basketball: 1993 (6A)
- Boys' soccer: 1991 (6A), 1992 (6A), 2000 (5A)

== Notable alumni ==
- Josh Bredl, 2009, professional wrestler
- Jamie Carey, 1999, WNBA player
- John Denney, long snapper for the Miami Dolphins
- Ryan Denney, 1995, defensive end for the Buffalo Bills
- Matthew Ryan Hoge, 1992, director, The United States of Leland
- Jeremy McKinney, 1994, offensive lineman for the St Louis Rams, Cleveland Browns, Dallas Cowboys, picked in the 11th round of the expansion draft by the Houston Texans
- Kevin Priola, Colorado State Senate, District 25(R)

== See also ==
- Adams County School District 12
- List of high schools in Colorado
