= New Mexicans for Science and Reason =

Organization

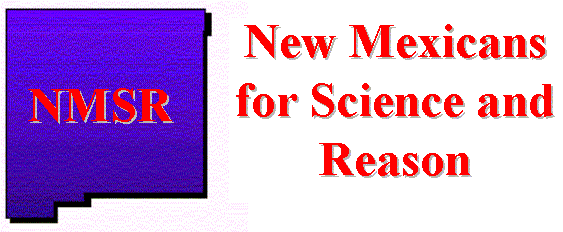
- Founder: Kendrick Frazier
- Purpose: Science advocacy
- Headquarters: Albuquerque, New Mexico
- Location: New Mexico
- President: Dave Thomas
- Vice President: John Covan
- Treasurer: Nancy Shelton
- Past President: John Geohegan
- Key people: Eddy Jacobs, Kim Johnson, Marilyn Savitt-Kring, Robert Cormack, Kendrick Frazier, John Geissman, Alan Hale, Randy Thornhill, Mark Boslough
- Affiliations: Committee for Skeptical Inquiry (CSI), Coalition for Excellence in Science and Math Education (CESE)
- Website: www.nmsr.org

New Mexicans for Science and Reason (also known by the abbreviation NMSR) is a science advocacy organization based in Albuquerque, New Mexico. Founded by Skeptical Inquirer editor Kendrick Frazier on May 16, 1990. As of 1998 the President is physicist and mathematician Dave Thomas. Thomas was still the President in spring of 2018 In 1996 creationists on the New Mexico School Board tried to change science standards to water down instruction of evolution. NMSR was instrumental in having that decision reversed.

== History ==
The organization was established in 1990 by Kendrick Frazier, the editor of Skeptical Inquirer. The Committee for Skeptical Inquiry's (CSI) focus during that time was to start local skeptic groups. Frazier, as a resident of Albuquerque, felt that the area had a good mix of potential members. "We have a lot of bizarre claims," he said, "from UFOs in the south to New Age claims in Santa Fe". At that time New Mexico was tied for second place in Skeptical Inquirer's state rankings of subscribers per capita, behind first-place California and tied with Colorado, Washington, and Massachusetts in second. The idea, according to Frazier was "to encourage critical thinking". Frazier had his eye on John Geohegan as a possible president of the group but, when asked, Geohegan felt he was too busy to do so. Two years later, CSICOP's Executive Director Barry Karr sent letters to most of the SI subscribers in New Mexico asking them if they would like to start a new group in New Mexico. He enclosed a survey and Frazier eventually received thirty-seven back. A venue was reserved at the Museum of Natural History on May 16, 1990. Twenty-eight people attended that first meeting and Geohegan agreed to be chairman. The birth of the group's newsletter The Enchanted Skeptic was agreed upon and Pen La Farge became editor. The name of the group was selected the following month. Frazier suggested that the name should have the word science in it and "say what we are for, not what we are against". NMSR was involved in attempts to restore evolution to the science standards of New Mexico schools in the 1990s. To combat the campaign against evolution, a sister group was started called the Coalition for Excellence in Science and Math Education. While there is still overlap between the members, the CESE and the NMSR are separate organizations. The CESE exists for serious activism and the NMSR is "where members go to play".

== Creationism in school textbooks ==
In 1996 two creationists on the New Mexico Board of Education "succeeded in replacing evolution and the age of the earth with 'various theories of origin' in the state science standards". This led NMSR and other residents to write letters to the Albuquerque Journal complaining about the lowering of science standards. Several members of the NMSR and CESE addressed the school board with their concerns. Dave Thomas from NMSR stated that if unscientific theories are allowed to be taught in public schools "pretty soon we'll have Holocaust deniers insisting there were no gas chambers". Sandia National Labs Physicist Marshall Berman challenged one of the seats held by a creationist school board member and won election to the board in 1998. A year into his tenure, he persuaded the board to vote 14-1 in favor of teaching evolution.

== Science Watch podcast ==
Formed in 2005, Science Watch was hosted by Dave Thomas and Kim Johnson and was a weekly podcast until 2010 when it discontinued recording. Barbara Forrest commended their efforts of providing good science to residents of Albuquerque. Forrest describes the podcast as "an example of the value of cultivating contacts with local media by providing them with information during flareups".

== Value of pi story ==
The organization's official newsletter is NMSR Reports. In April 1998, an article appeared in NMSR Reports stating that the state of Alabama intended to change the definition of pi to three, supposedly to bring it in line with the Christian Bible's statements on the matter. The article, which was satirical, was originally attributed to "April Holiday" of the "Associmated Press" [sic], but was really written by NMSR board member Mark Boslough. In addition to its appearance in NMSR Reports, the story was only posted in the talk.origins newsgroup on April 1, 1998, by Thomas who later that day confessed to the hoax. Several clues were included in the original post, including the author being named "April Holiday", and the article being posted on April Fools' Day. A few weeks later Thomas checked back on talk.origins website and elsewhere on the Internet by searching for the phrase "Alabama Pi", to his surprise he received "hundreds of hits". In some cases the "Associmated Press" was dropped and attributed to other sources, some people realized it was a hoax, while others clearly did not.

== Onyate man ==
On April 1, 1999, Stefan, who was studying at the University of Heidelberg, posted to a website about a fossil uncovered at a dig in New Mexico that he and other students were working on. Stefan stated that he was worried the website would not last long once word got out that "We found a fossil of a hominid, being eaten by an allosaurus [sic] dinosaur." He posted photos and included an email address for serious researchers or the media to contact for copies of the photos. The cast and specimens were loaded into a truck and driven away, but not before those present were cautioned to not tell anyone because it would ruin their careers and no one would likely believe them anyway. He ends the website with this notice: "PLEASE TELL YOUR FRIENDS. DON'T LET THE SCIENTISTS KEEP THE TRUTH FROM THE WORLD!" NMSR posted this website on an Art Bell newsgroup alt.fan.art-bell as well as on alt.religion.christian. The group followed the progress of the story over the next few weeks and saw it get picked up by alt.atheism. The website attracted over 2,000 views over the month, and many groups realized that it was a hoax. Some people researched people and places mentioned in Stefan's article and realized that aspects of the story were not credible. NMSR posted details demonstrating that Onyate man was a hoax, showing more photos and explaining who was behind the hoax. The reason they created this specific hoax was because they had held a debate in January 1999 with creationist Paul Gammill. At that debate, it was noted that finding a dinosaur fossil with a hominid's fossils inside would be ideal evidence that hominids existed at the same time as dinosaurs. Ed Brayton, writing for Patheos, described the hoax. He stated this was "a story designed to feed into creationist beliefs and overcome whatever latent skepticism they might have about such a find. ... Within 24 hours, Kent Hovind was citing this in his revival meetings as proof that evolution was a lie."

== Darwin Day ==
According to KRQE News 13, The Humanist Society of New Mexico, Freedom From Religion Foundation and NMSR intended to host a Darwin Day lecture series at the New Mexico Museum of Natural History in February 2014. When a flyer was posted showing that the lectures were being co-sponsored by the publicly funded museum, two former engineers complained that creationists were not allowed their side of the story. NMSR responded that the wording on the flyer was a "misunderstanding". KRQE News 13 received copies of the emails shared between the organizers and the museum's staff showing their involvement. The Department of Cultural Affairs (DCA) oversees the running of the museum and has stated that they have retrained their staff to "clearly distinguish State events from private events". Darwin Day 2015 was cancelled. One of the creationists who raised the issue noted their objection to cancelling the event rather than adding other viewpoints, noting "By cancelling Darwin Day, they have basically said, they will not be giving both sides of the story". The DCA stated "workload and staffing issues" caused the confusion. NMSR President Thomas responded on the NMSR website to accusations that the 2015 Darwin Day annual event was cancelled because the museum did not want to allow creationists to speak. Thomas says that this "story" is a creation of KRQE. The museum held a Darwin Day event in 2014 and there was "a brief error of attribution of an NMSR event as co-sponsored by the museum in a flyer, but this was corrected LAST YEAR, BEFORE the event even took place." (2014) In a letter shown on the KRQE video dated February 7, 2014, the DCA explained to the two creationists what had happened with the flyer. In 2015 KRQE reported that the 2014 event did not happen, although it did, and that the reason the annual event did not happen in 2015 was because of the complaint. Thomas explains that the Darwin Day event is not an annual event, it was not held in 2010, 2011, 2012 and 2013, though it was held prior to 2009. It did not happen in 2015 because the museum hired a new director who choose not to have another event. Thomas explains this was a "non story" in 2014, but in 2015 reporters Tina Jensen and Dean Stanley were pressured by the intelligent design community to run the story as if creationists were being discriminated against. Hemant Mehta wrote about this controversy, explaining "promoting science — in a museum, no less — isn't the same thing as promoting atheism. And a museum doesn't have to give 'equal time' to Intelligent Design".

== SkeptiCamp ==
New Mexicans for Science and Reason held its first Skepticamp on June 1-2 2024. Some of the presenters and their topics were: Dave Thomas (emcee, 9/11, and Flat Earth), Adrienne Hill (spirit and ghost photography), Ben Radford (emcee and The Blue Whale Game), Celestia Ward (fallibility of memory), Larry Barker (Bigfoot and Roswell UFOs), and Susan Gerbic (facilitated communication), Frank Etscorn (medical quakery), and Kurly Tlapoyawa (pseudoarcheology).There were also panel discussions as well as a presentation of the film The UFO Movie THEY Don’t Want You to See by Brian Dunning.

SkeptiCamps are informal, often free events sponsored by a local skeptic group, grassroots style. The speakers are usually from within the local group who present short talks, mostly on scientific skepticism topics, but sometimes from the world of science.

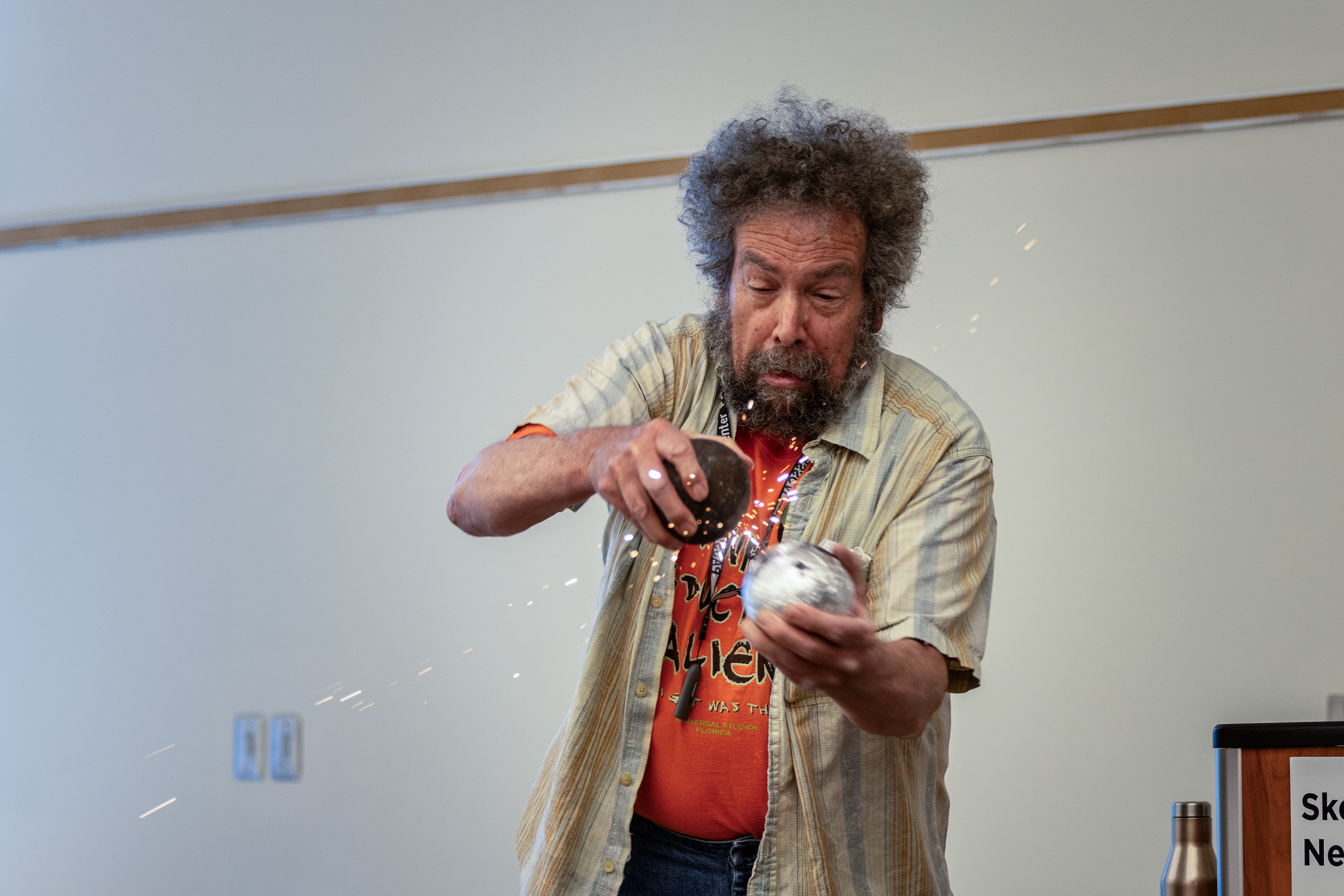
At the 2024 SkeptiCamp, Dave Thomas demonstrates how thermite could be created during the collapse of the World Trade buildings.

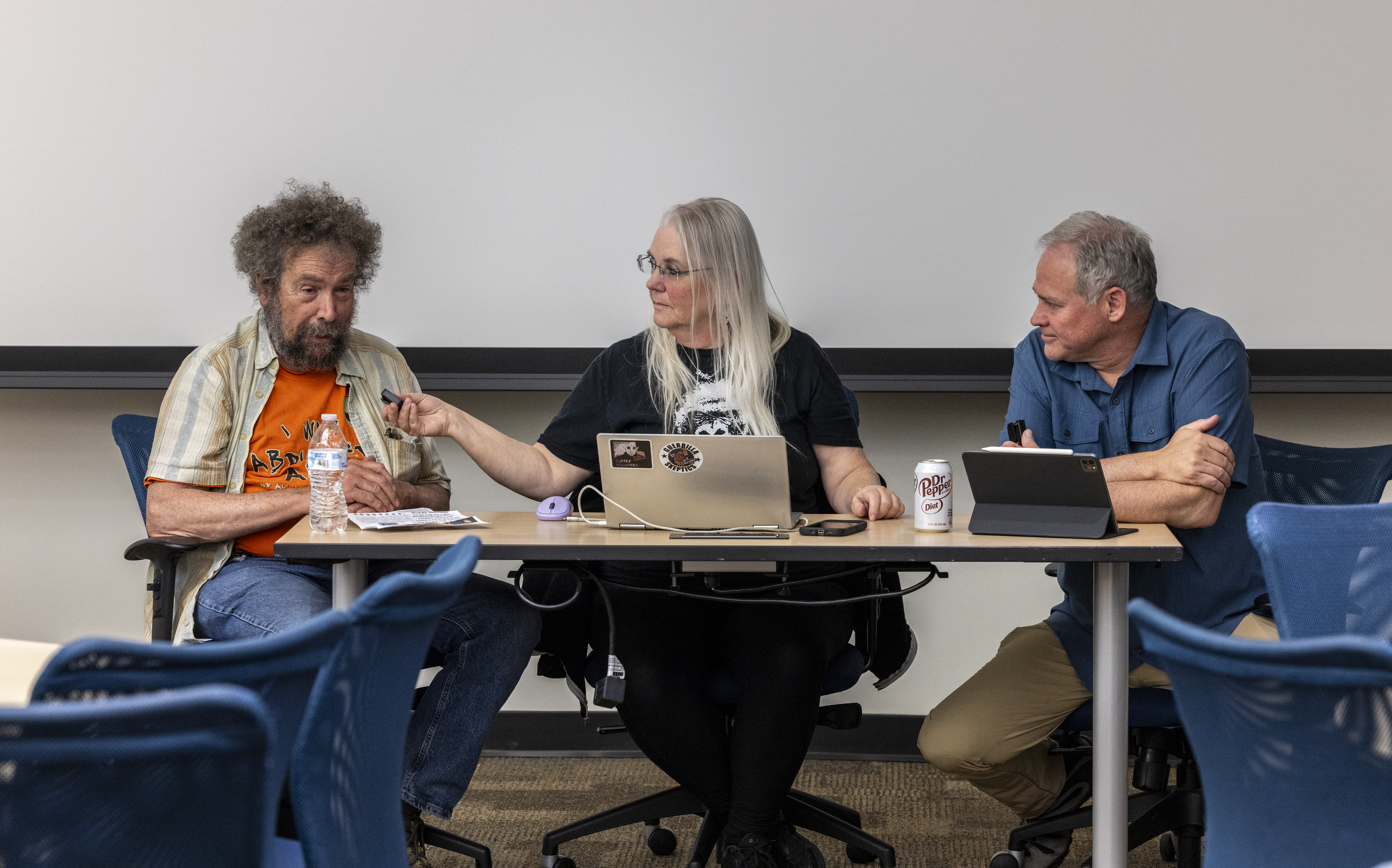
Panel at the NMSR Skepticamp. L to R: Dave Thomas, Susan Gerbic, Brian Dunning.

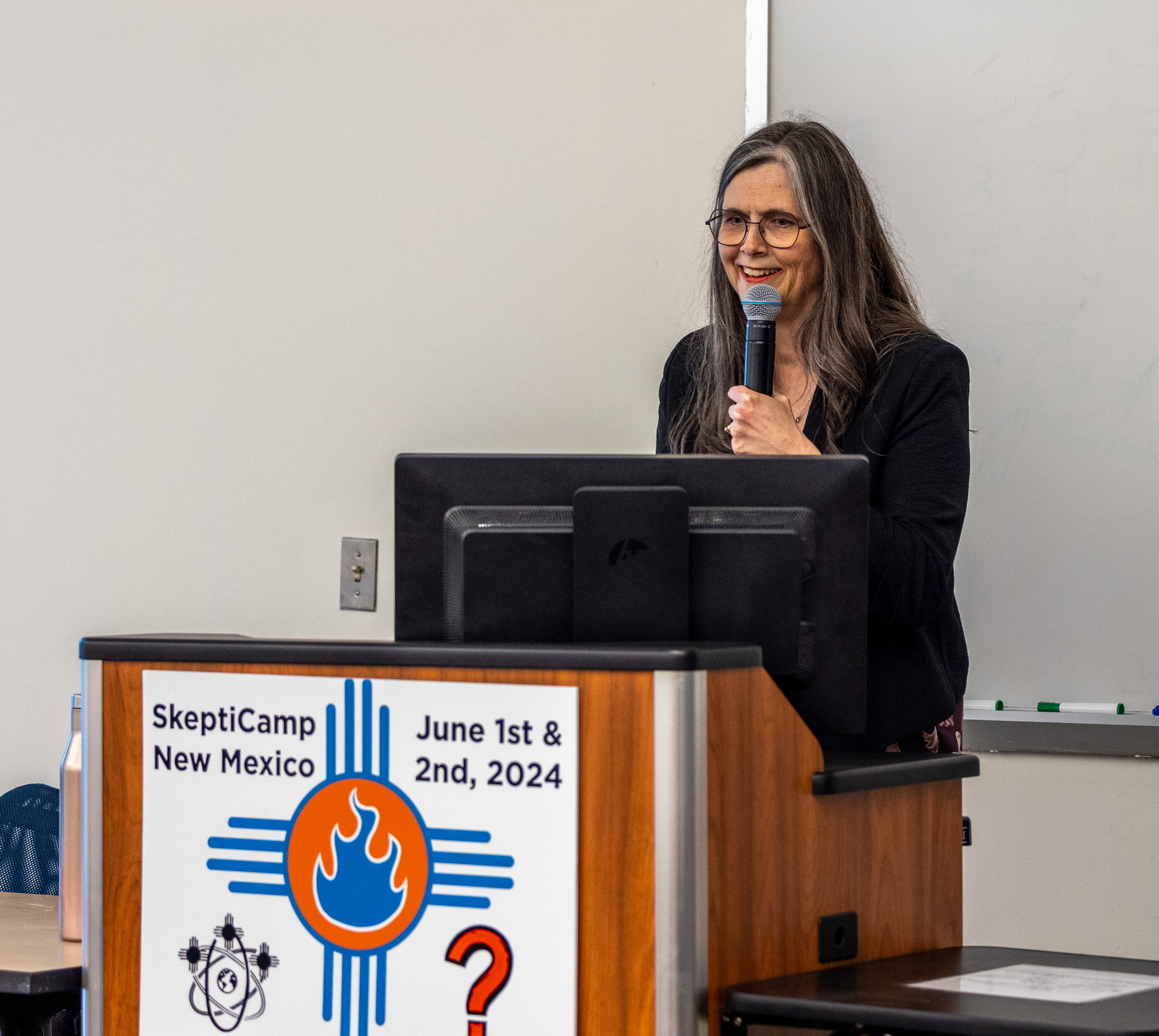
Adrienne Hill.

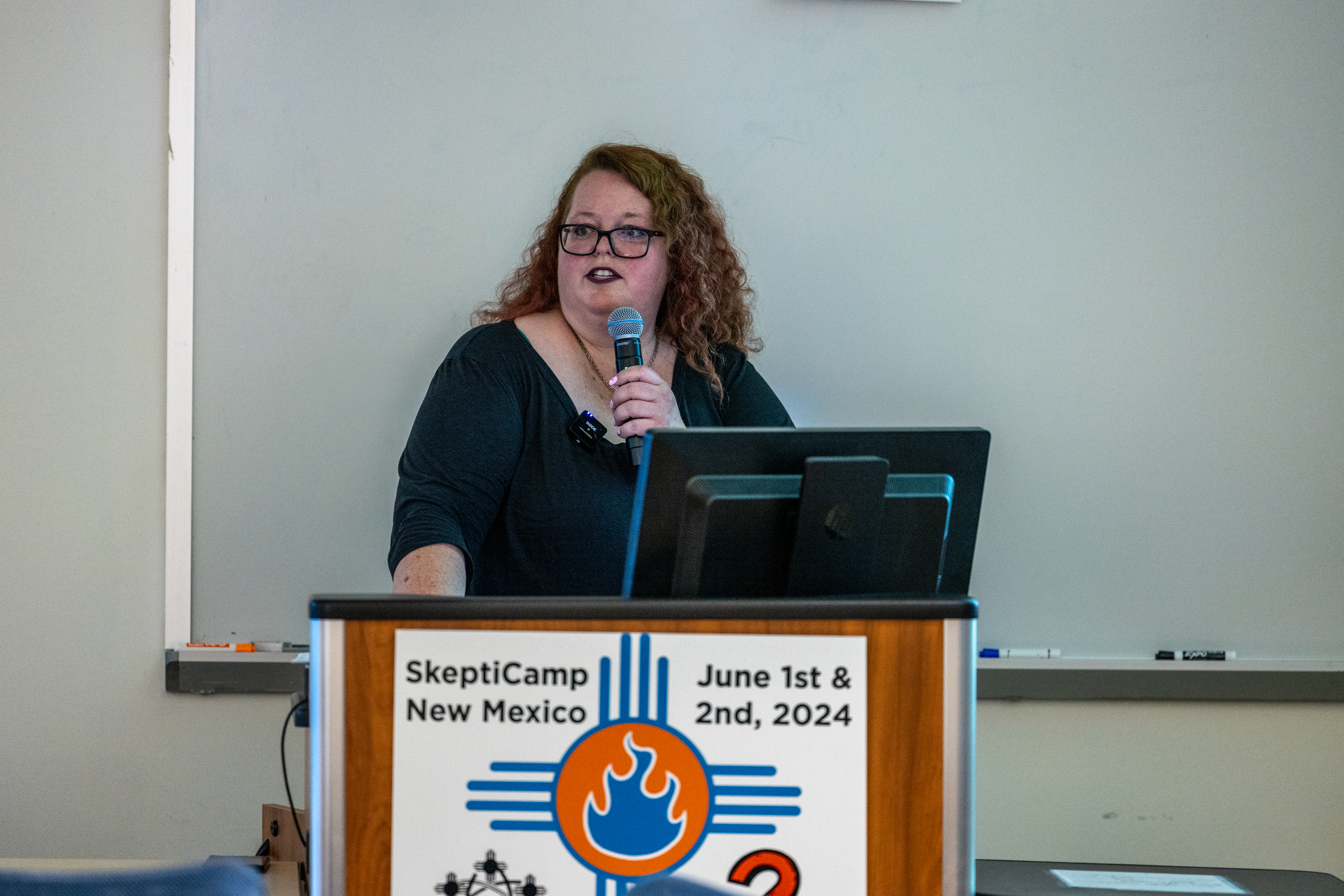
Celestia Ward.

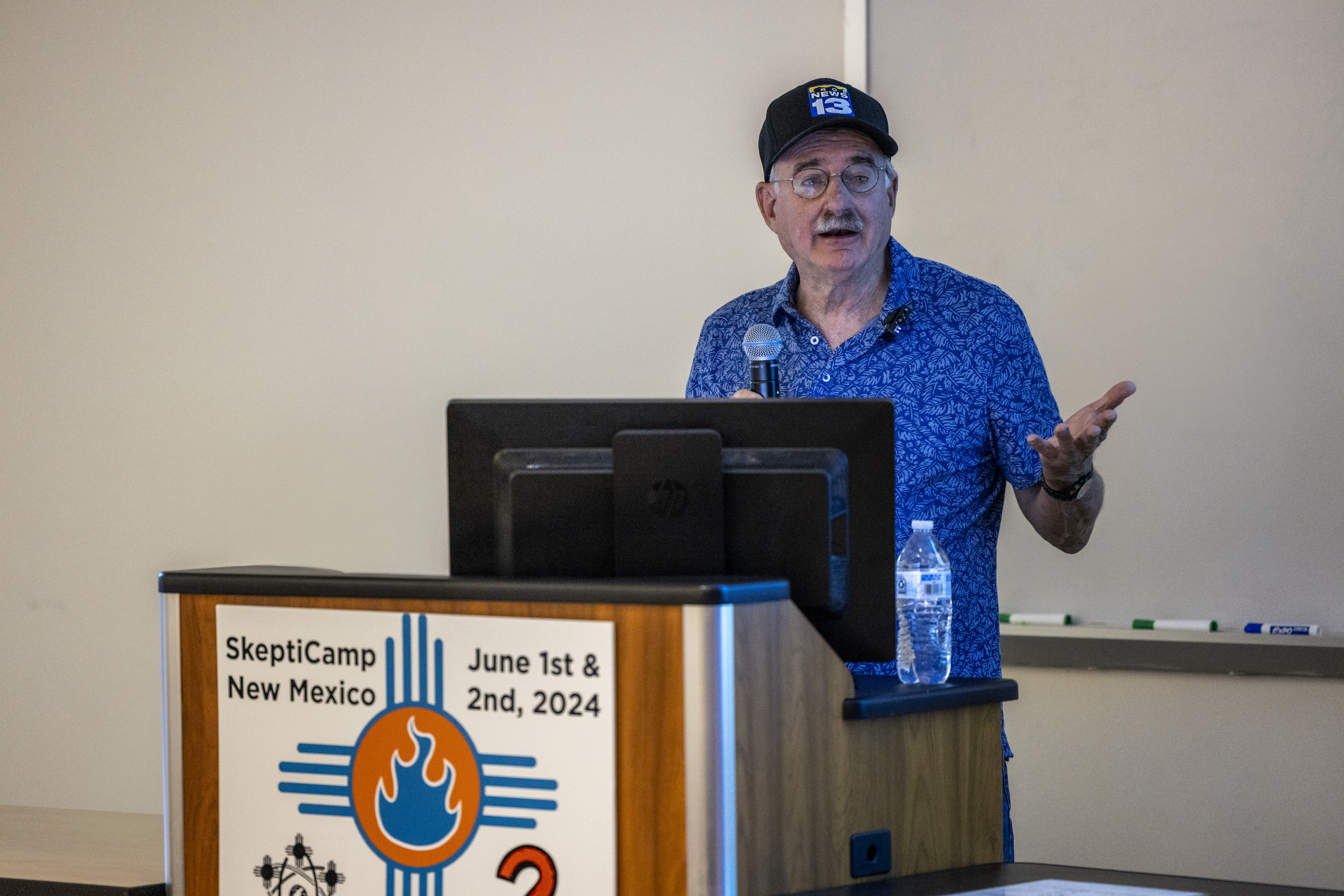
Larry Barker.

== Operations ==
According to the NMSR website, "NMSR meets at 7 PM on the second Wednesday of each month, at CNM Main Campus, STUDENT RESOURCE CENTER (SRC), room 204, right next to the Richard Barr Boardroom.

NMSR is a science organization; it is not a civil liberties or an anti-religious organization. Several of our members, like scientists in general, belong to various religious groups. We see no inherent conflict between science and religion, in that science concerns the natural world (the one accessible to our senses and instruments), while religion concerns the possibility of a supernatural world accessible only through faith. While we respect and cherish religious freedom, we stand ready to challenge those who promote bad science to further their goals, religious or otherwise.

== Gallery ==
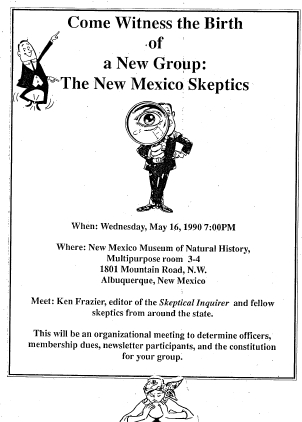
Original flyer sent to New Mexico SI subscribers in 1990

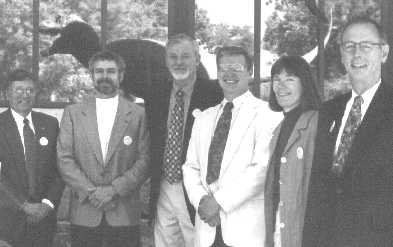
1998 campaign event for NM school board candidate Marshall Berman (wearing white coat) L-R Harrison Schmitt, NM Academy of Science President Richard Nygren, Al Narath from Sandia Base, Berman, Laura J. Crossey from UNM and Rev. Clyde Stanfield.

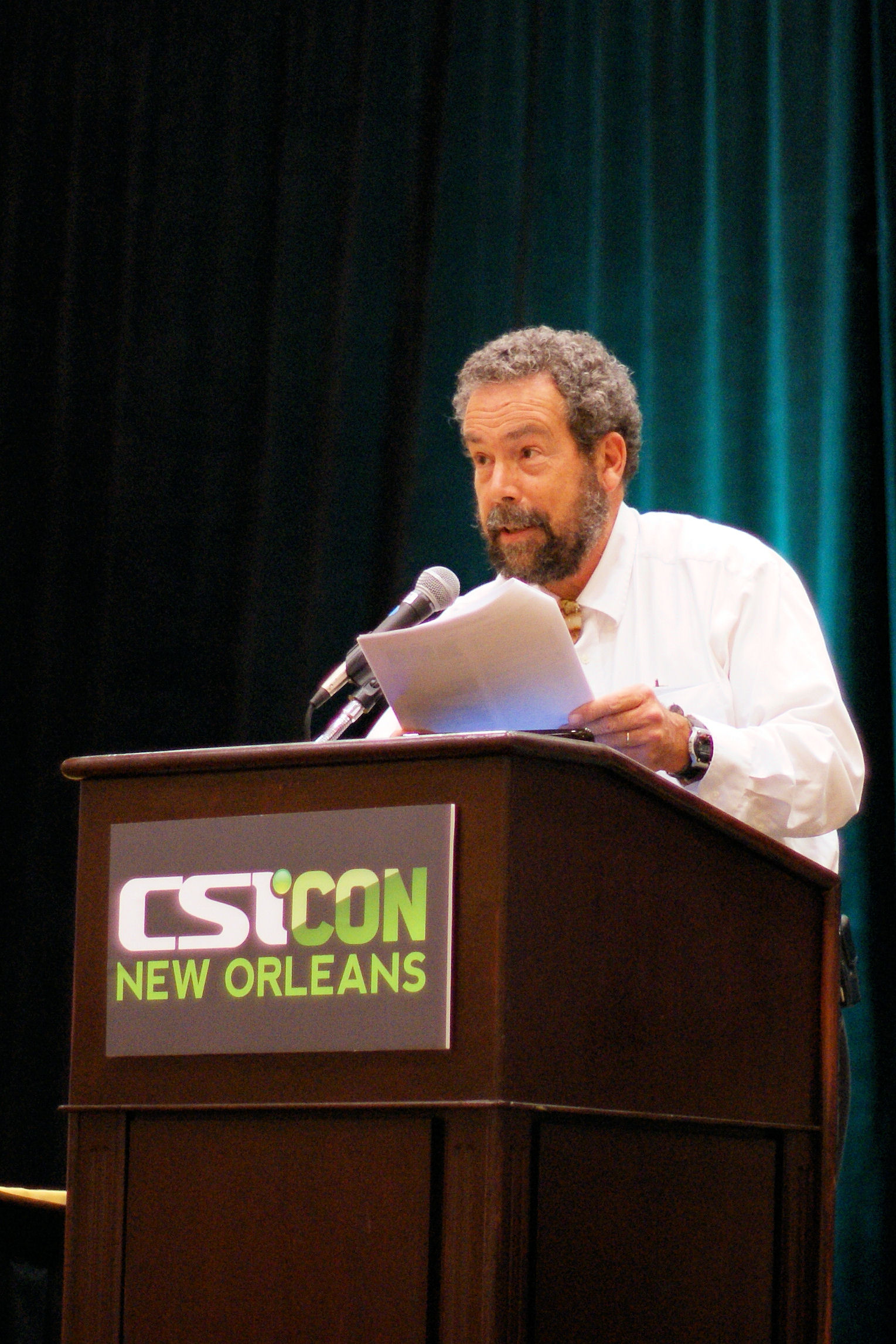
NMSR President Dave Thomas lectures at CSICon on "Evolution and Creation" in New Orleans 2011

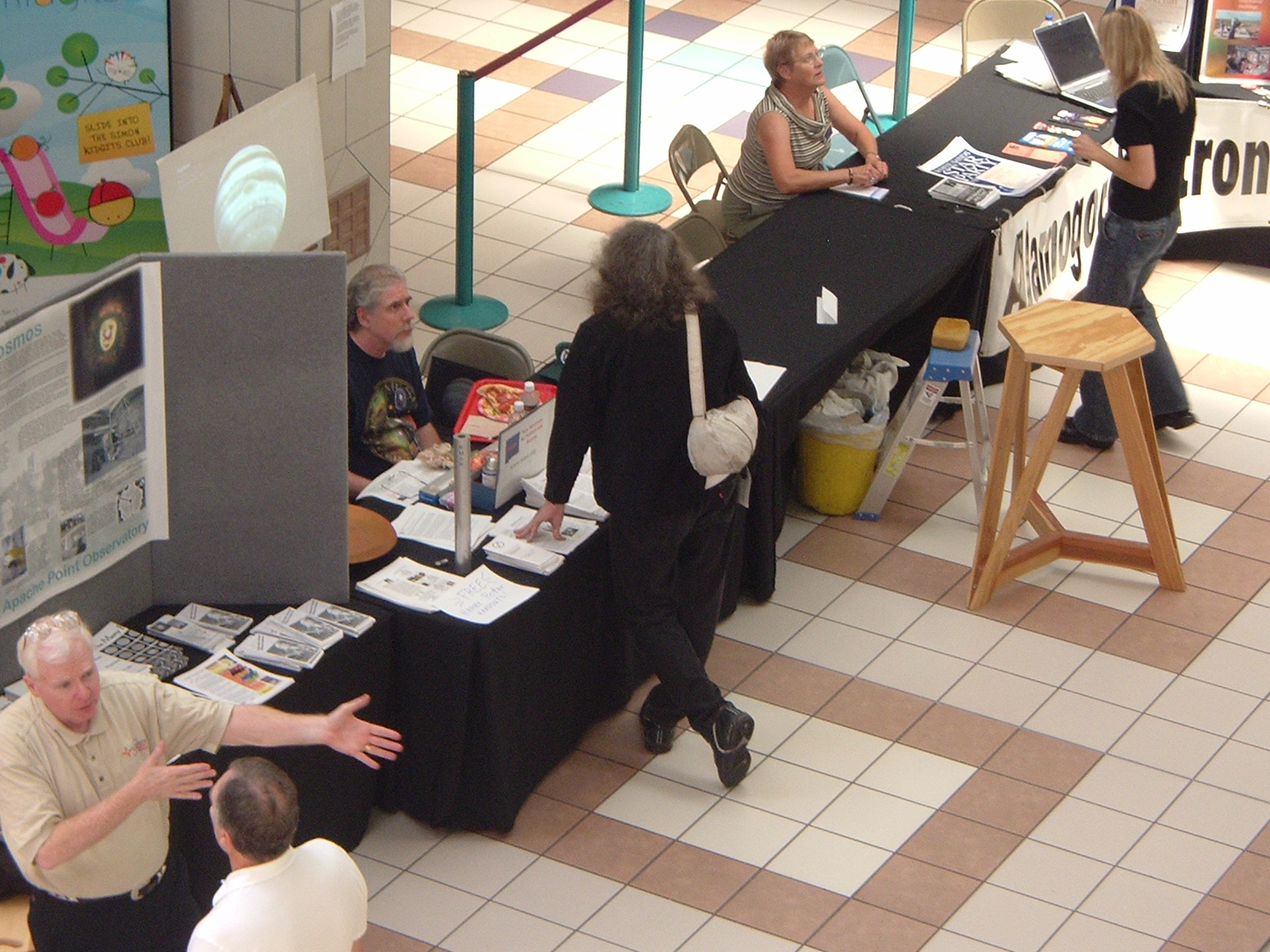
Cosmic Carnival - NMSR member Frank Gfelner talks with the public - 2005

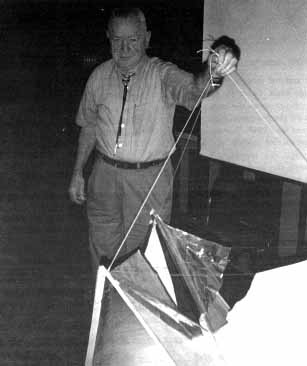
Atmospheric physicist Charles Moore displays radar reflector similar to those on balloons in Project Mogul experiments.

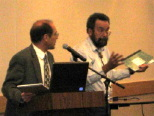
Richard Gage of Architects & Engineers for 9/11 Truth debates Dave Thomas at NMSR event

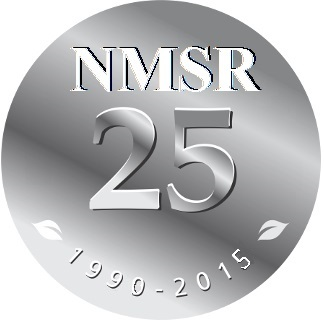
Logo created for NMSR's 25th anniversary in 2015

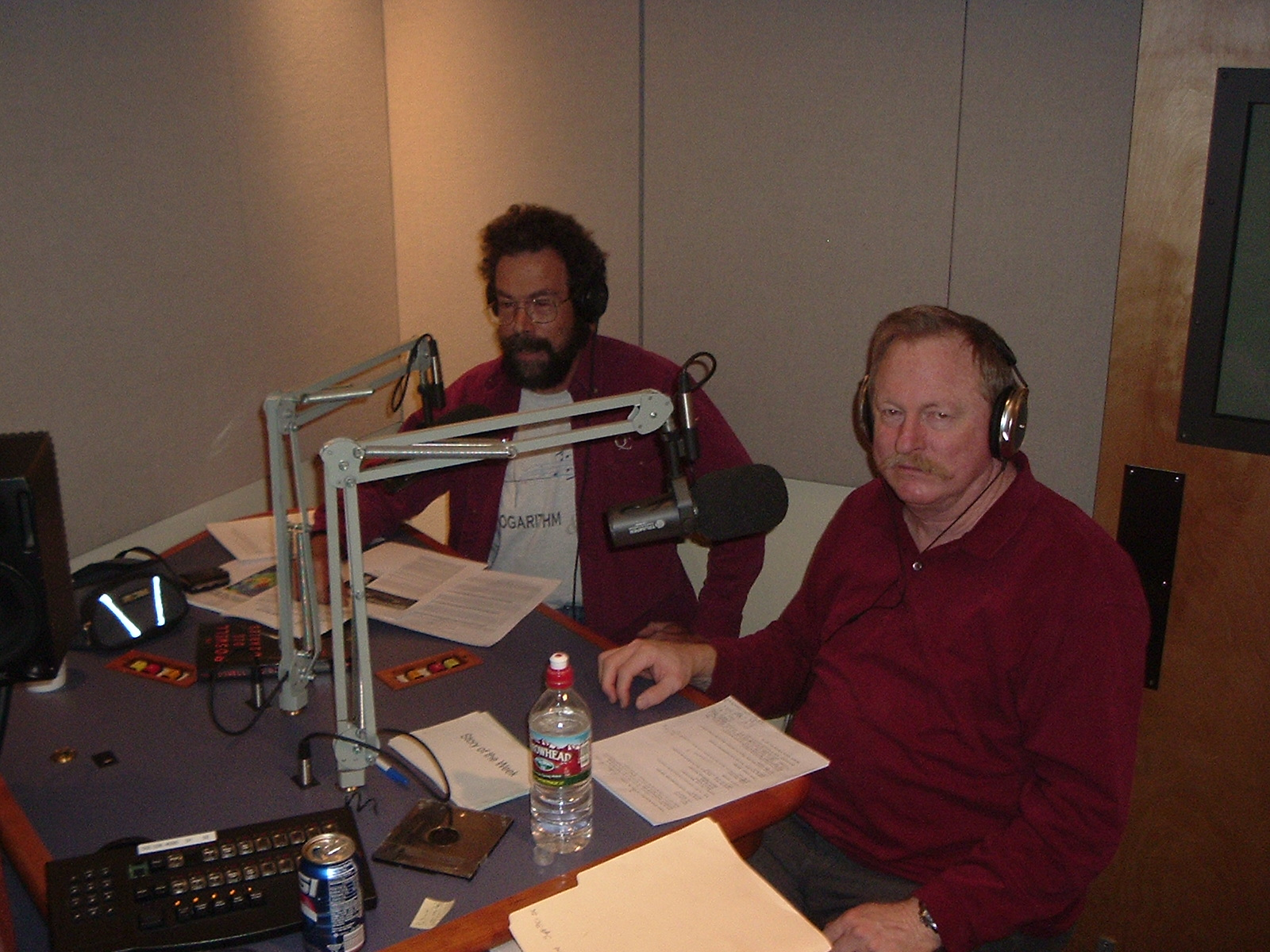
Science Watch podcast recording with hosts Dave Thomas and Kim Johnson

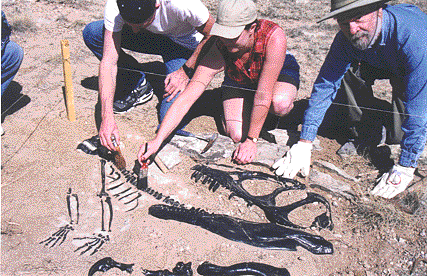
This shows the Onyate Man Hoax setup. The "hominid" and allosauruones were provide by artist David Arthur Thomas (at right), who played the part of "Dr Heinschvagel" in the hoax

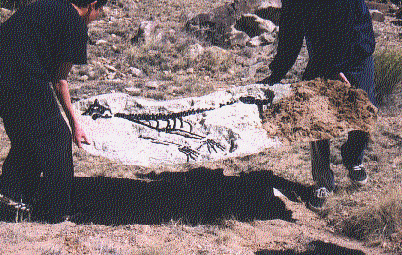
This shows the dismantling of the Onyate Man Hoax setup. The "hominid" was a fiberglass sculpture of "Dead Pan" by artist David Arthur Thomas
