= Thornton Middle School =

Thornton Middle School may refer to:

- International School at Thornton Middle, part of the Adams 12 Five Star Schools in Thornton, Colorado
- Thornton Middle School, part of the Cypress-Fairbanks Independent School District in Harris County, Texas
- Thornton Middle School, part of the Fremont Unified School District in Fremont, California
- Ronald Thornton Middle School, part of the Fort Bend Independent School District in Sienna Plantation, Texas
