= Thornton High School =

Thornton High School is the name of numerous high schools in the United States, including:

- Thornton High School (Colorado) in Thornton, Colorado
- Thornton Township High School in Harvey, Illinois
- Thornton Fractional South High School in Lansing, Illinois
- Thornton Fractional North High School in Calumet City, Illinois
- Thornton High School in the Jefferson Union High School District in Daly City, California
- Thornton High School (Iowa), a defunct high school in Thornton, Iowa
