= Prospect Ridge Academy =

Charter school in Colorado, US

Location
- 2555 Preble Creek Parkway, Broomfield CO. Broomfield, Colorado 80023; United States; 39°59′39″N 105°01′3.6″W

Information
- Type: Charter school
- Motto: Creating Academic, Social, and Ethical Leaders.
- School district: Adams 12
- CEEB code: 060169
- Principal: Adam DiGiacomo (high school); Amy Bruce (K-8); April Wilkin (Executive Director)
- Teaching staff: 72.50 (FTE)
- Grades: K–12
- Enrollment: 1,457 (2023-2024)
- Average class size: 22
- Student to teacher ratio: 19:1
- Hours in school day: 7
- Colors: Black and yellow
- Sports: Football, basketball, golf, cross-country, soccer, baseball, track & field, tennis, volleyball, cheerleading
- Team name: Miners
- Website: www.prospectridgeacademy.org

Prospect Ridge Academy (PRA) is a K-12 charter school in the Adams 12 School District in Broomfield, Colorado. It was founded as a K-6 school, then added a grade each year. It has now become a full K-12 school, with the high school being built three years ahead of schedule due to popular demand. The inaugural class graduated in May 2018.

== History ==
The school was founded as a K-6 school, after being approved by the Adams 12 board in 2011, as well as by a unanimous decision from the Broomfield committee. The school purchased land in North Park, a neighborhood development in Broomfield, and began construction on the K-8 building, while the school operated in an office space in Thornton for six months. The school grew to fill the building in the 2013-2014 school year.

By the 2013-2014 school year, the demand for the high school building was so high that construction was begun in the 2014-2015 school year so that the inaugural K-8 class would also be the first to graduate. An addition to the building was completed prior to the 2017-2018 school year which included four more classrooms, two teacher work-spaces, and more robust athletic facilities including a weight room and locker rooms. Further work was completed prior to the 2018-2019 school year adding a second gymnasium as well as a regulation football field with track. Future expansion plans include the construction of an auditorium.

== Campus ==
The elementary/middle school building is approximately 45,000 sq/ft, complete with a school library and gymnasium. The total cost of building the facility was around $8 million. The high school building cost $14 million to build and includes two gymnasiums, and another library.

=== Middle school athletics ===
Prospect Ridge Academy is one of the few Adams 12 schools to offer middle school sports, as most others have eliminated sports due to budget cuts. It offers basketball, football, volleyball, soccer, cross-country, and golf, and shuffleboard.

=== Academics ===
As of October 2026, the high school is ranked by the US News & World Report as the 40th best school in Colorado, and 6716th nationally.

== Athletics ==
In the high school's first year, since the only class was the freshman class, the only sports teams were freshman teams. However, sports participation was as high for freshman teams as the surrounding high schools of its size. The high school now in its 10th year, offers football, boys soccer, cross country, boys golf, girls golf, boys tennis, cheerleading, volleyball, boys basketball, girls basketball, baseball, track and field, girls soccer, and girls tennis. All of the sports now all have a varsity level with some having JV and freshman levels.

Prospect Ridge Academy Sports excluding boys tennis (4A) and football (1A), all participate in the 3A division of the Colorado High School Activities Association, in the Metro League, which includes Jefferson Academy, Peak to Peak Charter School, Kent Denver School, Colorado Academy, Faith Christian Academy, SkyView Academy, Manual High School, Stargate School, and Bishop Machebeuf High School.

=== Athletic Achievements ===
Cheerleading:

2019-20 State Champions

2020-21 State Runner-ups

2021-22 State Champions

Girls Golf:

2021-22 State Runner-ups
