= Broomfield, Colorado =

Consolidated city and county in Colorado, United States

Broomfield
- Consolidated city and county
- City and County of Broomfield
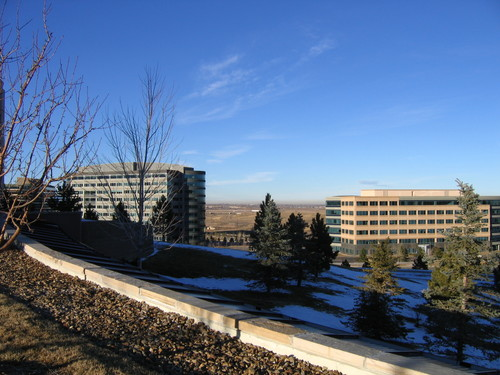
- Broomfield, Colorado Interlocken office park

- Flag Seal

- Location of the City and County of Broomfield in Colorado
- Coordinates: 39°57′15″N 105°03′10″W
- Country: United States
- State: Colorado
- City and County: Broomfield
- Incorporated: June 6, 1961
- Consolidated: November 15, 2001
- Named for: The broomcorn once grown in the area

Government
  - Type: Consolidated city and county
  - Mayor: Guyleen Castriotta

Area
  - Total: 33.548 sq mi (86.890 km^{2})
  - Land: 32.968 sq mi (85.387 km^{2})
  - Water: 0.580 sq mi (1.503 km^{2})
- Elevation: 5,348 ft (1,630 m)

Population (2020)
  - Total: 74,112
  - Estimate (2025): 79,174
- Time zone: UTC−07:00 (MST)
  - Summer (DST): UTC−06:00 (MDT)
- ZIP code: 80020, 80021, 80023, 80038 (PO Box)
- Area codes: 303/720/983
- GNIS city ID: 2409919
- GNIS county ID: 1945881
- FIPS city code: 08-09280
- FIPS county code: 08-99014
- Website: City and County of Broomfield

Broomfield is a consolidated city and county located in the U.S. state of Colorado. It has a consolidated government which operates under Article XX, Sections 10–13 of the Constitution of the State of Colorado. Broomfield's population was 74,112 at the 2020 United States census, making it the 15th most populous municipality and the 12th most populous county in Colorado. Broomfield is a part of the ten-county Denver-Aurora-Centennial, CO Metropolitan Statistical Area and the 18-county Front Range Urban Corridor.

== History ==
The Broomfield post office opened on September 26, 1884. Historians speculate that the town was named for the sorghum grown in the area, also known as broomcorn, which had stalks that were sold to make brooms and whisk brooms.

Several railroads figure in the development of this area. The Colorado Central Railroad built a narrow-gauge line from Golden in 1873; the Denver, Utah and Pacific Railroad arrived in 1881; and the Denver, Marshall and Boulder Railway built a line through what is now Broomfield in 1886. The Denver, Utah and Pacific was widened to standard gauge in 1889. One of the early names for the area was Zang's Spur, after the railroad spur serving Adolph Zang's grain fields.

The Denver–Boulder Turnpike was constructed through the Broomfield area to speed automobile travel between the state capital of Denver and the university city of Boulder. Construction of the toll road began in 1950 and the turnpike was opened to traffic on January 19, 1952, with the sole toll plaza at Broomfield with access to U.S. Route 287 through the town. The toll to travel from Federal Boulevard in Adams County to Broomfield was 10 cents and the toll from Broomfield to Boulder was 15 cents, or 25 cents for the whole route.

The City of Broomfield was incorporated on June 6, 1961, in the southeastern corner of Boulder County. The Denver–Boulder Turnpike was a common commuting route and Broomfield became a popular residential area. On September 14, 1967, having paid off its construction and operating expenses, the turnpike was made free and became the official route of U.S. Route 36 between Denver, Boulder, and the Rocky Mountain National Park. The turnpike became the first public toll road in the United States to become free.

In the 1990s, after three decades of aggressive annexation, the City of Broomfield had expanded into Adams, Jefferson, and Weld counties in addition to Boulder. City leaders felt increasing chagrin with the need to deal with four different county governments, four separate county sales tax bases, and four separate court districts. They began pushing to make Broomfield a consolidated city-county similar to Denver, reasoning that they could provide services more responsively if Broomfield had its own county government.

The city sought an amendment to the state constitution to create a new county. The amendment was passed in 1998, after which a three-year transition period followed.

On November 15, 2001, Broomfield County became the 64th and least extensive county of Colorado. It is the newest county in Colorado (and in the entire United States, if county equivalents are not included).

== Geography ==
Broomfield is located midway between Denver and Boulder along U.S. Routes 36 and 287.

At the 2020 United States census, Broomfield had a total area of 21,471 acres (86.890 km^{2}), including 371 acres (1.503 km^{2}) of water. It is the smallest county by area in Colorado, and the 5th smallest in the United States.

=== Airport ===
Rocky Mountain Metropolitan Airport is located in Broomfield.

=== Major highways ===
- I-25 / US 87
- US 36
- US 85
- US 287
- SH 7
- SH 121
- SH 128
- Northwest Parkway

=== Adjacent counties ===
- Weld County — northeast
- Adams County — southeast
- Jefferson County — southwest
- Boulder County — northwest

=== Climate ===
According to the Köppen climate classification system, Broomfield has a cold semi-arid climate (BSk). According to the United States Department of Agriculture, it is in plant hardiness zone 6a with an average annual extreme minimum temperature of −9.4 °F (−23.0 °C).

Climate data for City and County of Broomfield, CO. Elevation 5407 ft
Month	Jan	Feb	Mar	Apr	May	Jun	Jul	Aug	Sep	Oct	Nov	Dec	Year
Mean daily maximum °F (°C)	45.4 (7.4)	47.5 (8.6)	54.6 (12.6)	62.3 (16.8)	71.6 (22.0)	81.9 (27.7)	88.7 (31.5)	86.2 (30.1)	78.1 (25.6)	65.8 (18.8)	53.0 (11.7)	44.7 (7.1)	65.1 (18.4)
Mean daily minimum °F (°C)	18.3 (−7.6)	20.2 (−6.6)	27.0 (−2.8)	33.8 (1.0)	43.0 (6.1)	51.7 (10.9)	57.6 (14.2)	56.2 (13.4)	47.3 (8.5)	35.9 (2.2)	25.7 (−3.5)	18.0 (−7.8)	36.3 (2.4)
Average precipitation inches (mm)	0.44 (11)	0.43 (11)	1.64 (42)	2.07 (53)	2.26 (57)	1.73 (44)	1.76 (45)	1.86 (47)	1.26 (32)	1.12 (28)	0.87 (22)	0.68 (17)	16.12 (409)
Average relative humidity (%)	50.5	51.1	48.0	45.8	49.6	46.8	44.2	48.5	46.1	47.2	49.8	51.8	48.3
Average dew point °F (°C)	15.6 (−9.1)	17.7 (−7.9)	22.6 (−5.2)	28.2 (−2.1)	38.6 (3.7)	45.8 (7.7)	50.0 (10.0)	50.8 (10.4)	41.7 (5.4)	31.4 (−0.3)	22.2 (−5.4)	15.6 (−9.1)	31.8 (−0.1)
Source: PRISM Climate Group

=== Ecology ===
According to the A. W. Kuchler U.S. potential natural vegetation types, Broomfield would have a Bouteloua/buffalograss (65, commonly known as grama grass) vegetation type and a shortgrass prairie (17) vegetation form.

== Demographics ==
Historical population
Census	Pop.	Note	%±
1960	4,535		—
1970	7,261		60.1%
1980	20,730		185.5%
1990	24,638		18.9%
2000	38,272		55.3%
2010	55,889		46.0%
2020	74,112		32.6%
2025 (est.)	79,174	▲	6.8%
U.S. Decennial Census

Broomfield is a part of the Denver–Aurora–Lakewood, CO Metropolitan Statistical Area.

=== Racial and ethnic composition ===
Broomfield, Colorado – Racial and ethnic composition Note: the US Census treats Hispanic/Latino as an ethnic category. This table excludes Latinos from the racial categories and assigns them to a separate category. Hispanics/Latinos may be of any race.
Race / Ethnicity (NH = Non-Hispanic)	Pop 2000	Pop 2010	Pop 2020	% 2000	% 2010	% 2020
White alone (NH)	32,023	44,358	53,904	83.67%	79.37%	72.73%
Black or African American alone (NH)	329	530	927	0.86%	0.95%	1.25%
Native American or Alaska Native alone (NH)	176	244	197	0.46%	0.44%	0.27%
Asian alone (NH)	1,580	3,368	5,096	4.13%	6.03%	6.88%
Pacific Islander alone (NH)	12	43	80	0.03%	0.08%	0.11%
Other race alone (NH)	36	66	351	0.09%	0.12%	0.47%
Mixed race or Multiracial (NH)	645	1,064	3,638	1.69%	1.90%	4.91%
Hispanic or Latino (any race)	3,471	6,216	9,919	9.07%	11.12%	13.38%
Total	38,272	55,889	74,112	100.00%	100.00%	100.00%

=== 2020 census ===
As of the 2020 census, Broomfield had a population of 74,112. The population density was 2,248 people per square mile (868 people/km^{2}), making it the second most densely populated county in Colorado behind Denver. A total of 99.6% of residents lived in urban areas, while 0.4% lived in rural areas.

The median age was 37.7 years. 21.9% of residents were under the age of 18 and 14.7% were 65 years of age or older. For every 100 females there were 99.7 males, and for every 100 females age 18 and over there were 98.7 males age 18 and over.

There were 29,682 households in Broomfield; 30.3% had children under the age of 18 living in them. Of all households, 51.8% were married-couple households, 18.5% were households with a male householder and no spouse or partner present, and 21.8% were households with a female householder and no spouse or partner present. About 26.4% of all households were made up of individuals and 8.5% had someone living alone who was 65 years of age or older.

There were 31,298 housing units, of which 5.2% were vacant. The homeowner vacancy rate was 0.8% and the rental vacancy rate was 6.8%.

Racial composition as of the 2020 census
Race	Number	Percent
White	56,334	76.0%
Black or African American	989	1.3%
American Indian and Alaska Native	435	0.6%
Asian	5,146	6.9%
Native Hawaiian and Other Pacific Islander	89	0.1%
Some other race	3,017	4.1%
Two or more races	8,102	10.9%
Hispanic or Latino (of any race)	9,919	13.4%

=== American Community Survey estimates ===
In 2024, there were 33,695 households, of which 50.6% were married couples living together, 8.4% were cohabiting couple households, 17.7% had a male householder with no spouse/partner present, and 23.3% had a female householder with no spouse/partner present. 22.2% of households had one or more people under 18 years and 26.4% of households had one or more people 65 years or older. The average household size was 2.31 people, and the average family size was 2.91 people.

In 2024, age distribution figures showed 18.9% of residents under the age of 18 and 16.3% age 65 years or older. The median age was 38.0 years and females made up 49.4% of the population.

In 2024, the median household income in Broomfield was $125,055 and the median family income was $148,477. The per capita income for the city was $64,783, with 7.9% of the population living below the poverty line and 5.0% without health care coverage. By 2019–2023 estimates, Broomfield had the 3rd highest median household income among Colorado counties and the 41st highest in the United States; for families, the median income was the 2nd highest among Colorado counties and the 20th highest in the United States.

In 2024, the educational attainment of residents over age 25 included 97.3% being high school graduates (or higher), 64.4% holding a bachelor's degree (or higher), and 28.4% holding a graduate or professional degree. The foreign-born population was 11.5%.

== Politics ==
When the county was formed in 2001, it was a swing county, and it has voted for the winner of Colorado's electoral votes since then. In the 2012 election, incumbent president and Democrat Barack Obama defeated Republican Mitt Romney by roughly five percentage points. In recent years, the county has trended towards the Democratic Party, in line with the rest of the Denver area. In 2016, it voted decisively for Hillary Clinton. Joe Biden won the county by a larger margin in 2020, and Kamala Harris won the county by an even larger margin in 2024.

As of August 1, 2025, among 56,705 active registered voters in Broomfield, 15,317 were Democrats, 10,412 were Republicans, and 29,857 were not affiliated with any party.

Broomfield voters approved ranked-choice voting for municipal elections in 2021. Due to a lack of candidates and delays in the Colorado Secretary of State auditing procedures, implementation of ranked-choice voting has been delayed until 2027.

United States presidential election results for Broomfield, Colorado
Year	Republican		Democratic		Third party(ies)	
Year	No.	%	No.	%	No.	%
2004	12,007	51.68%	10,935	47.06%	293	1.26%
2008	12,757	43.31%	16,168	54.89%	528	1.79%
2012	15,008	45.67%	16,966	51.62%	891	2.71%
2016	14,367	38.12%	19,731	52.35%	3,591	9.53%
2020	16,295	34.94%	29,077	62.35%	1,260	2.70%
2024	16,071	34.30%	29,426	62.81%	1,351	2.88%

United States Senate election results for Broomfield County, Colorado2
Year	Republican		Democratic		Third party(ies)	
Year	No.	%	No.	%	No.	%
2020	17,855	38.65%	27,447	59.41%	894	1.94%

United States Senate election results for Broomfield County, Colorado3
Year	Republican		Democratic		Third party(ies)	
Year	No.	%	No.	%	No.	%
2022	12,975	34.56%	23,617	62.91%	950	2.53%

Colorado Gubernatorial election results for Broomfield County
Year	Republican		Democratic		Third party(ies)	
Year	No.	%	No.	%	No.	%
2022	11,796	31.47%	25,006	66.72%	678	1.81%

== Economy ==
Company housing image for Monarch Mine in Broomfield, 1947

In the 1990s, Broomfield and other area suburbs experienced tremendous economic growth, much of it focused in technology.

The FlatIron Crossing mall is a large shopping and entertainment center, anchored by Dick's Sporting Goods, Macy's, and Forever 21.

Crocs, Vail Resorts, MWH Global, Flatiron Dragados, Webroot, Noodles & Company, Mrs. Fields, and Spatial Corp are headquartered in Broomfield.

=== Top employers ===
According to Broomfield's 2023 Comprehensive Annual Financial Report, the top employers in the city are:

#	Employer	# of Employees
1	Oracle America	1,650
2	Intermountain Health Care	1,550
3	BAE Systems	1,100
4	Hunter Douglas Window Fashions Division	950
5	City and County of Broomfield	900
6	Vail Resorts	750
7	DanoneWave Foods	600
8	Crocs	600
9	Broadcom Inc.	500
10	VMware	450

== Media ==
The Broomfield Enterprise is the local newspaper. KBDI-TV, the secondary PBS member station for the Denver area, is licensed to Broomfield.

== Recreation ==
Broomfield's recreational opportunities include the Paul Derda Recreation Center and pool, athletic fields, courts and rinks and open space and trails.

Since 2005, Broomfield staff have had the stated goal of designating 40% (9,555 acres) of the city's planning area as open lands. As of 2024, the open lands percentage was 36% (8,607 acres). Broomfield has an extensive trail system that connects the various lakes and parks. A scenic trail connects the Stearns Lake and the Josh's Pond memorial on the west side of town. Broomfield also has a 9/11 memorial containing a piece of a steel beam from one of the towers.

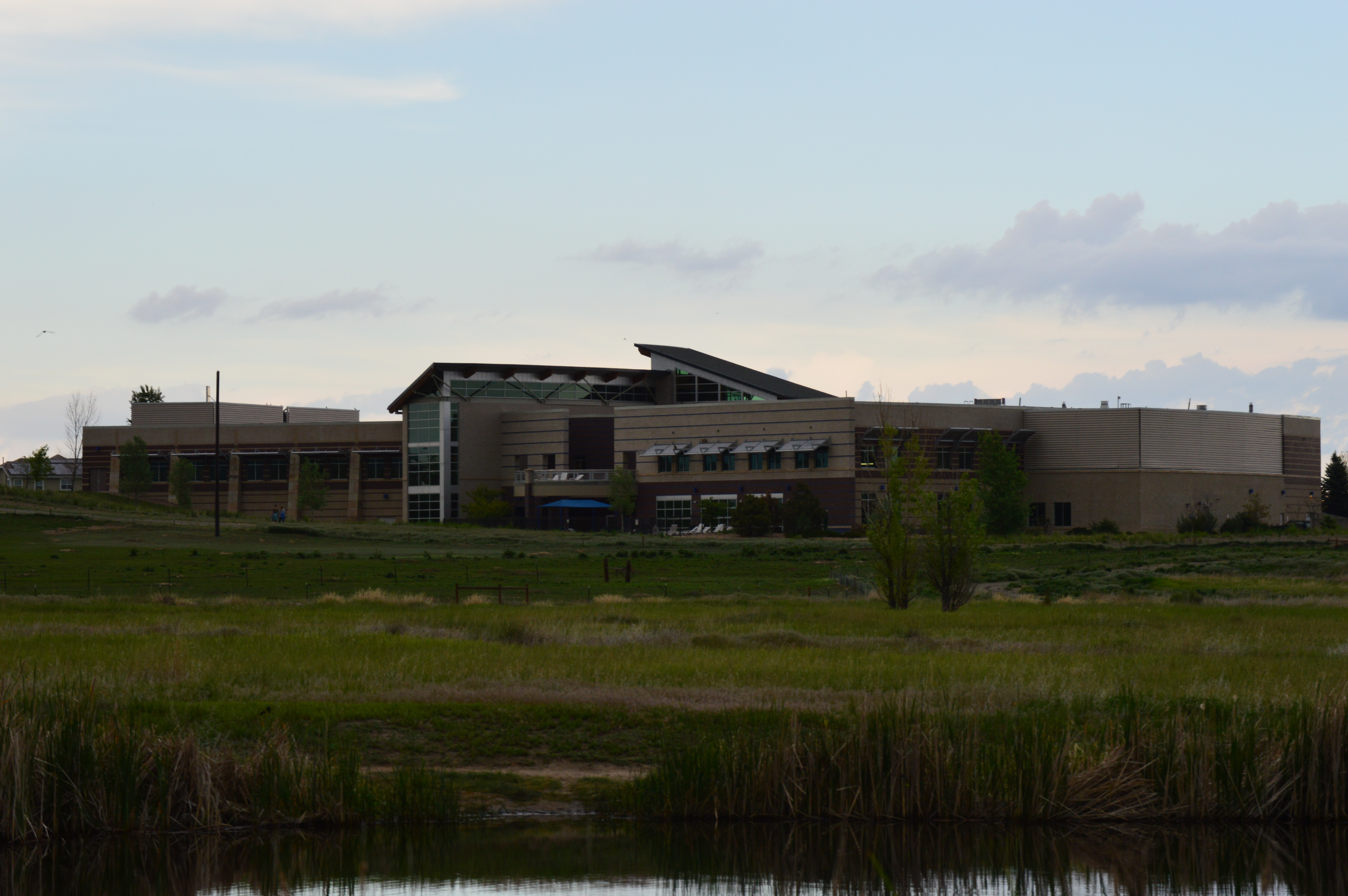
The Paul Derda Recreation Center

Broomfield also has a skate park with many different features such as bowls, a large half-pipe and several "street" obstacles.

The Broomfield Community Center (renovated in 2020) offers a wide variety of fitness classes, senior activities, and hosts swim meets and kids' camps for the whole city and county.

A few of the favorite outdoor activities of Broomfield residents are tennis and golf. There are a large number of golf courses and tennis courts open to the public. Broomfield Community Center also hosts other Denver metro cities in their center, mainly for pickleball games and tournaments.

== Government ==
Broomfield's leadership includes the Mayor, the Mayor Pro Tem, the City and County Manager, Attorney, and City Council members.

Broomfield City and County Leadership
Role	Name
Mayoral Office
Mayor	Guyleen Castriotta
Mayor Pro-Tem	Jean Lim
City Officials
City and County Manager	Jennifer Hoffman
City and County Attorney	Nancy Rodgers
City Council Members
Ward 1
Julie Twiss	Katie Peterson
Ward 2
Paloma Delgadillo	Austin Ward
Ward 3
Jean Lim	Sarah Braun
Ward 4
Sean McKenzie	Laurie Anderson
Ward 5
Heidi Henkel	Todd Cohen

=== Sheriff and county commissioners ===
Broomfield operates as a consolidated city-county. The city council acts simultaneously as the board of county commissioners, and the police chief is simultaneously the county sheriff. The Broomfield Police Department performs all of the duties that would normally be performed by a county sheriff's office, including operating the county jail (detention center), providing security and bailiff services for the Broomfield Municipal, County, and District Courts and the Combined Courts Building, and providing civil process in the county. The police chief can be hired or fired at will by the city council, which makes Broomfield's sheriff, along with Denver's, the only non-elected sheriffs in the state.

== Education ==
Since Broomfield used to be divided among four counties, students living in the city were served by the separate school districts for their county. While the city is now united within one county, it is still separated among 6 school districts:

- Boulder Valley School District
- 27J Schools
- Weld County School District RE-8
- Jefferson County Public Schools
- St. Vrain Valley School District
- Adams 12 Five Star Schools

Of Colorado's 10 largest school districts, 4 (Jefferson County, Adams 12 Five Star, St. Vrain Valley, and Boulder Valley) have sections in Broomfield.

Broomfield features two large public high schools (Broomfield High School and Legacy High School), two public middle schools, and eight public elementary schools. There are four private schools: Brightmont Academy, a 1-to-1 school for all grade levels; Broomfield Academy, with an academic preschool, an elementary school, and a middle school; Holy Family, a Catholic high school; and Nativity of Our Lord Parish, a Catholic elementary school. Broomfield also contains two K–12 charter schools — Prospect Ridge Academy and Front Range Academy, which has two Broomfield campuses.

== Notable people ==
Notable individuals who were born in or have lived in Broomfield (or both) include:

- Mark Boslough, physicist
- Drew Brown, musician, guitarist for OneRepublic and Debate Team
- Colin Duffy, pro climber and two-time Olympian
- Ralph Gean, singer/songwriter.
- Lindsey Halligan, lawyer for Donald Trump
- David Hale Hand, son of Disney and Gaumont-British animator David Hand
- Dianne Primavera, 50th Lieutenant Governor of Colorado and former member of the Colorado House of Representatives
- Anna Prins, basketball center
- Vince Russo, pro wrestling personality and podcaster
- Steve Schmuhl, swimmer
- Mike Wilpolt, football wide receiver, defensive back, coach
- Cat Zingano, bantamweight MMA fighter

== Sister city ==
Broomfield has three sister cities, as designated by Sister Cities International:

- Ueda, Nagano Prefecture, Japan
- Cheyenne and Arapaho Tribes, United States
- Lalitpur Metropolitan City, Nepal

== See also ==
- Front Range Urban Corridor
- Rocky Flats National Wildlife Refuge
