= Mark Boslough =

Physicist with expertise in planetary impacts and global catastrophes

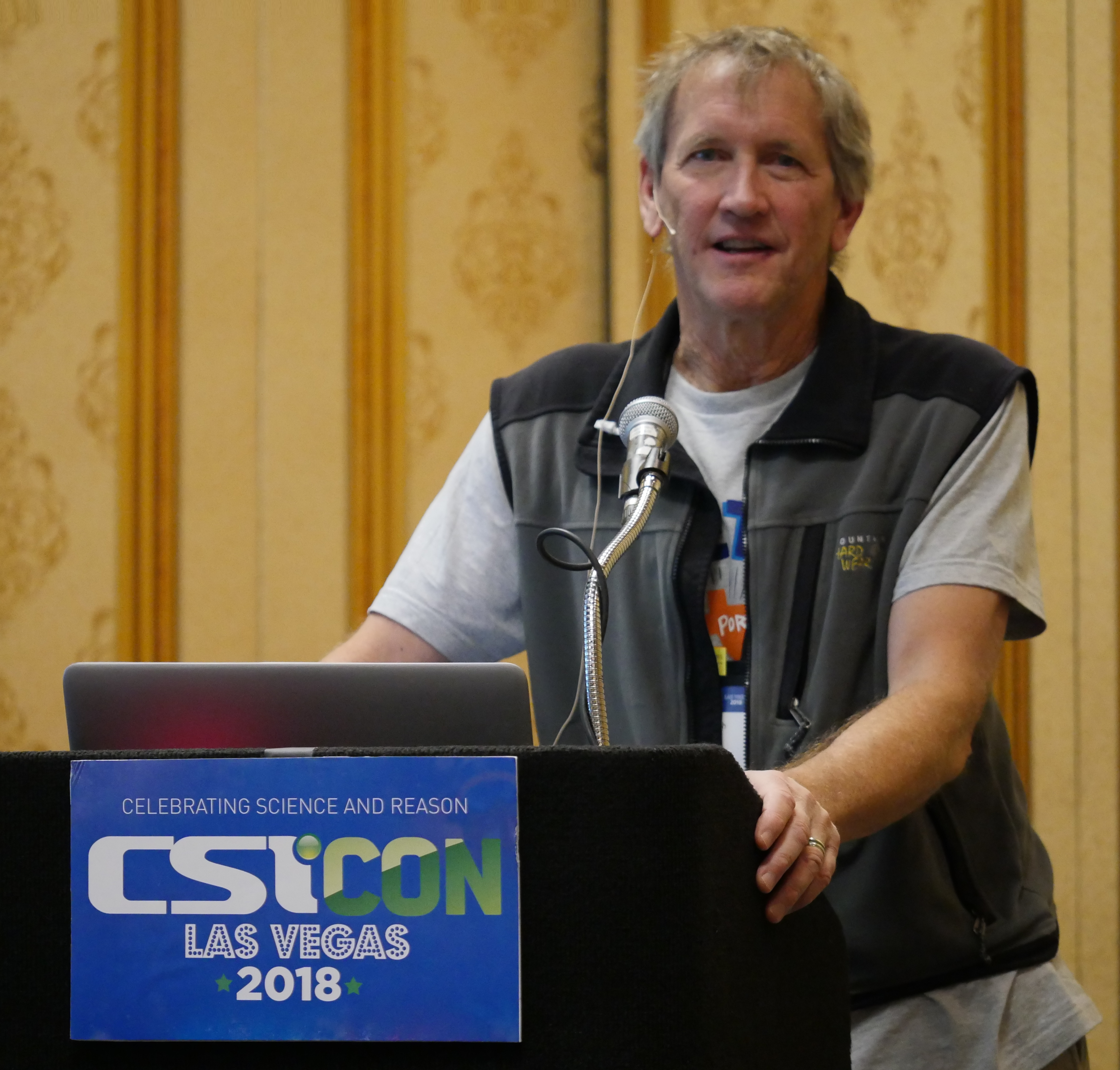
- Mark Boslough CSICon at 2018 Climate Literacy Workshop
- Born: Iowa
- Education: California Institute of Technology; Colorado State University
- Scientific career
- Fields: Physics; Geophysics; Planetary Defense
- Workplaces: Los Alamos National Laboratory; University of New Mexico; Sandia National Laboratories
- Doctoral advisor: Thomas J. Ahrens
- Mark Boslough's voice recorded October 2016 at CSICon
- Website: www.unm.edu/~mbeb/home.html

Mark Boslough (/ˈbɒzloʊ/) is an American physicist at Los Alamos National Laboratory, research professor at University of New Mexico, fellow of the Committee for Skeptical Inquiry, and chair of the Asteroid Day Expert Panel. He is an expert in the study of planetary impacts and global catastrophes. Due to his work in this field, Asteroid 73520 Boslough (2003 MB1) was named in his honor.

== Background and education ==
Boslough grew up in Broomfield, Colorado. He holds a B.S. in physics at Colorado State University, and an MS and PhD in applied physics at the California Institute of Technology.

== Scientific career ==
An expert on planetary impacts and global catastrophes, Boslough's work on airbursts challenged the conventional view of asteroid collision risk and is now widely accepted by the scientific community. He was the first scientist to suggest that the Libyan Desert Glass was formed by melting due to overhead heating from an airburst. His hypothesis was popularized by the documentaries "Tutunkhamun's Fireball" (BBC), (recipient of Discover Magazine's Top 100 Science Stories of 2006) and National Geographic's "Ancient Asteroid". Footage from the documentaries has been used to describe the controversial notion that a large airburst over North America caused an abrupt climate change mass extinction. However, Boslough has been a leading critic of the Younger Dryas impact hypothesis, arguing among other things that the proponents have misinterpreted his airburst models. He appeared as a skeptic on the "Last Extinction" Nova, (recipient of AAAS Kavli award for best science documentary of 2009).

In February 2011, it was announced that Boslough had been elected a fellow of the Committee for Skeptical Inquiry. Also in 2011, he presented a paper at the IAA Planetary Defense Conference in Bucharest, Romania, in which he defined "Type 1" and "Type 2" airbursts (also called "touchdown" airbursts). He stated, "It is virtually certain (probability > 99%) that the next destructive NEO event will be an airburst." This prediction proved true less than two years later, on Feb. 15, 2013, when an airburst over Chelyabinsk, Russia injured more than 1000 people. Boslough was among the first western scientists to arrive in Chelyabinsk, where he did field research and accompanied a production crew filming Meteor Strike for Nova. Most of the documentaries are focused on his impact and airburst modeling.

In recognition of Boslough's work in the field of planetary impacts and global catastrophes, Asteroid 73520 Boslough (2003 MB1) was named in his honor.

In 2014, Boslough delivered a major address on "death plunge" asteroids that can pose a sudden danger to Earth at the second Starmus Festival in the Canary Islands. Also in 2014 he talked about his interest in asteroids to Physics Today: "In his childhood home in Colorado, says Boslough, "there was a left-brain right-brain thing going on, with fiction and nonfiction in the same household."

Boslough authored chapter 13 of the 2018 book Planetary Defense: Global Collaboration for Defending Earth from Asteroids and Comets, entitled 'Uncertainty and Risk at the Catastrophe Threshold'.

=== Scientific skepticism ===
Boslough is a vocal critic of pseudoscience and anti-science and has written about climate change denial in the Skeptical Inquirer in reference to "Climategate" conspiracy theories. He is also active in uncovering scientific misconduct.

=== Humor ===
An advocate of using humor to defend science, he once published an essay as an April Fool's Day joke in the April, 1998 issue of the New Mexicans for Science and Reason newsletter to poke fun at New Mexico's legislature for attempting to require schools to teach creationism. He wrote that the Alabama state legislature had voted to change the value of the mathematical constant pi from 3.14159 to the 'Biblical value' of 3.0. The article was posted on a newsgroup and passed around to people via email, causing an outrage. When people started calling the Alabama legislature to protest, the joke was revealed. National Geographic News highlighted Boslough's story when it compiled a list of "some of the more memorable hoaxes in recent history." It was elevated by the Museum of Hoaxes to number seven on its "Top 100 April Fools Hoaxes of All Time" list. It eventually took on a new existence as an urban legend and has had to be debunked by Snopes.

He also demonstrated that emailed lists of "Darwin Awards" include fake stories. After receiving an annual list of unfortunate deaths at the end of 1998, he fabricated his own over-the-top fictional Darwin Award recipient, appended it, and forwarded the list to his friends. That story also went viral, was printed as an actual event by the Denver Post, leading to another debunking by Snopes.

== Political career ==
In a tweet on March 13, 2018, Boslough announced he was a candidate for the New Mexico House of Representatives, challenging the incumbent William Rehm. Boslough lost the primary election to the incumbent william Rehm, 1,509 to 288 (84% to 16%).

=== Private property rights ===
Boslough is an advocate of laws to reform the 19th-century law known as RS 2477 to prevent it from being used to take private property for public use. His fight turned into a prolonged battle with off-road clubs pulling out boulders and seedlings that Boslough used to try and restore his property. He also received verbal and physical threats before he successfully defended a lawsuit (Ramey v. Boslough) in which the ownership of a four-wheel-drive road across his Colorado property was challenged by a plaintiff who was backed by off-road recreation interests. He used this experience to argue that the "right to radiate" is a prescriptive private property right, and that carbon polluters must compensate individuals for degrading their personal cooling capacity.

== See also ==
- Indiana Pi Bill
