= Revised statute 2477 =

US federal law

Revised Statute 2477, commonly known as RS 2477 was enacted by the United States Congress in 1866 to encourage the settlement of the Western United States by the development of a system of highways. Its entire text is one sentence: "the right-of-way for the construction of highways across public lands not otherwise reserved for public purposes is hereby granted."

The original grant did not require being recorded, meaning it was self-enacting, and in 1866 constructing a road often meant using a trail many times and perhaps filling low places, moving rocks and placing signs.

It granted to counties and states a right-of-way across federal land when a highway was built.

RS 2477 was repealed in 1976 under the Federal Land Policy and Management Act (FLPMA). The repeal was subject to "valid existing rights." The relevant text (Sec. 701. 43 U.S.C. 1701) reads (a) "Nothing in this Act, or in any amendment made by this Act, shall be construed as terminating any valid lease, permit, patent, right-of-way, or other land use right or authorization existing on the date of approval of this Act".

== Controversy ==
Shared-access advocates claim that neither the Bureau of Land Management, Forest Service nor other federal agencies, nor even private landowners have the authority to close RS 2477 roads. Their interpretation of the statute has brought them into conflict with wilderness advocates, the federal government and private landowners.

=== Conflicts on Federal Lands ===
RS 2477 has become an issue for wilderness advocacy groups because of language in the Wilderness Act of 1964. According to Section 2 (c) 3, any area to be considered for wilderness status must contain "a least five thousand acres of land or is of sufficient size as to make practicable its preservation and use in an unimpaired condition." Section 4 (c) further specifies, "Except as specifically provided for in this Act, and subject to existing private rights, there shall be no commercial enterprise and no permanent road within any wilderness area designated by this Act". Thus an RS 2477 "highway" which qualifies as a "road" could disqualify the land it traverses from being recognized by the federal government as a "wilderness" if it reduced the area under consideration beneath the 5,000 acre limit.

Access advocates have sometimes organized to reopen or maintain what they consider to be legitimate RS 2477 roads. The Jarbidge Shovel Brigade is the best-known group that was formed for this purpose.

Landowners, environmental organizations, government organizations (federal, state and county) and recreational-use advocates have very different understandings of the law. Conflicts among these groups came to a head when President Bill Clinton declared the Grand Staircase–Escalante, in southern Utah, to be a National Monument. Several Utah counties have been fighting in court to assert RS 2477 claims to roads that cross federal and private property, including across the Grand Staircase–Escalante National Monument.

In 2010, Interior Secretary Ken Salazar authorized interior representatives to negotiate federal recognition of RS 2477 roads for which there is a clear historical record. In August 2010, quiet title of the Skutumpah Road, within the Grand Staircase–Escalante National Monument, was granted to Kane County, Utah.

=== Conflicts on Private Lands ===
As western lands become developed into residential subdivisions, motorized recreationists and sportsmen are continuing to claim access rights on privately constructed, owned, and maintained roads that cross private land and gated communities. Because some disputed roads were never recorded by counties, shared-access groups claim that private landowners hold property with an unrecorded public right-of-way. Property rights advocates say that failure to record a right-of-way means that there was no intention to create a public right.

Shared-access groups argue that lack of formal action by counties does not diminish the public’s easement/usufruct rights through private lands. They have engaged in threats, trespassing, and vandalism to vigorously assert those rights.

Private property activists claim that nobody has access rights without a recorded easement. Shared-access activists claim that virtually all private land that used to be public can legally be traversed by the public. There is little common ground between these interpretation, so lawsuits are being fought in the western United States, and it has fallen to the courts to determine which routes are public and which are not.

Courts have applied state laws, federal laws, and federal land court rulings to resolve RS 2477 claims. Recent examples of failed attempts to assert RS 2477 rights on private property are Galli v. Idaho County (Case Number CV 36692, Second Judicial District of Idaho, 2006) and Ramey v. Boslough (Case Number 02-CV-582, Boulder County District Court, 20th Judicial District of Colorado, 2007). An RS 2477 case involving County Road 200 in Garfield County, Colorado, was decided in favor of the county on December 23, 2020, in the U.S. District Court of Colorado by Judge R. Brooke Jackson. The plaintiff, High Lonesome Ranch, has appealed to the U.S. 10th Circuit Court of Appeals.
