= Matthew Ryan Hoge =

American writer and film director (born 1974)

- Born: 1974 (age 50–51)
- Education: University of Southern California
- Occupation(s): Screenwriter, film director

Matthew Ryan Hoge (born 1974) is an American writer and film director, known for writing and directing The United States of Leland (2003).

== Biography ==
Hoge was raised in the northern Denver suburb of Thornton, Colorado. He attended Horizon High School, where he participated in the school's theatre program and was introduced to the philosophy of Albert Camus. Hoge earned a BFA in Writing for Film and Television from the USC School of Cinema-Television in 1996.

== Works ==
- Self Storage (1999)
- The United States of Leland (2003)
