= Jack Weil (American football) =

American football player (born 1962)

No. 13, 2
- Position: Punter

Personal information
- Born: March 16, 1962 (age 64); Denver, Colorado, U.S.
- Listed height: 5 ft 11 in (1.80 m)
- Listed weight: 175 lb (79 kg)

Career information
- High school: Northglenn (Colorado)
- College: Wyoming
- NFL draft: 1984: undrafted

Career history
- Denver Broncos (1986); Washington Redskins (1987)

Awards and highlights
- Consensus All-American (1983); First-team All-WAC (1983)
- Stats at Pro Football Reference

Jack Lee Weil (born March 16, 1962) is an American former professional football player who was a punter in the National Football League (NFL) for two seasons during the mid-1980s.

Weil was born in Denver, Colorado and played scholastically at suburban Northglenn High School. He attended the University of Wyoming, where he played for the Wyoming Cowboys football team. In 1983, Weil led the nation in punting, averaging 45.6 yards per kick. He became the first Cowboy in history to earn Consensus All-America honors.

Weil signed with his hometown Denver Broncos as an undrafted free agent in 1986, and played a single season with them. In 1987, he joined the Washington Redskins as a replacement player during the NFLPA strike, and appeared in all three games. The Redskins went on to win the Super Bowl that year. In January 2018, 30 years after Super Bowl XXII, the Redskins awarded Super Bowl rings to 26 replacement players, including Weil.

Weil was formerly on the coaching staff as an assistant coach for Standley Lake High School in 2010.

He is currently designated as Principle at Golf and Sport Solutions, a company that specializes in athletic fields.

He currently resides in La Salle, Colorado.
