= Loren Snyder =

American football player (born 1963)

No. 18
- Position: Quarterback

Personal information
- Born: November 28, 1963 (age 62); Yakima, Washington, U.S.
- Listed height: 6 ft 4 in (1.93 m)
- Listed weight: 207 lb (94 kg)

Career information
- High school: Thornton (CO)
- College: Northern Colorado
- NFL draft: 1987: undrafted

Career history
- Dallas Cowboys (1987); Denver Broncos (1988)*
- * Offseason or practice squad member only

Awards and highlights
- All-NCC (1986)

Career NFL statistics
- Passing yards: 44
- TD–INT: 0-0
- Passer rating: 59.5
- Stats at Pro Football Reference

Loren Howard Snyder (born November 28, 1963) is an American former professional football player who was a quarterback in the National Football League (NFL) for the Dallas Cowboys. He played college football for the Northern Colorado Bears.

== Early life ==
Snyder attended Thornton High School. He accepted a football scholarship from the Division II University of Northern Colorado. He was named a starter at quarterback as a sophomore, after passing senior Tom Aiello on the depth chart.

As a junior, he led the North Central Conference with 2,384 passing yards and 17 touchdown passes.

As a senior, he set a school single-season record with 2,724 passing yards, also breaking Mike Busch's North Central Conference 1984 mark. He additionally set school single-season records with 23 touchdown passes and 2,464 total offensive yards.

He finished his college career with 14 school records, including 6,214 passing yards, 6,874 total offensive yards and 48 touchdown passes. In 2010, he was inducted into the University of Northern Colorado Athletic Hall of Fame.

== Professional career ==
Snyder was signed as an undrafted free agent by the Dallas Cowboys after the 1987 NFL draft. He was waived on August 31.

After the NFLPA strike was declared on the third week of the 1987 season, those contests were canceled (reducing the 16-game season to 15) and the NFL decided that the games would be played with replacement players. In September, he was re-signed to be a part of the Dallas replacement team that was given the mock name "Rhinestone Cowboys" by the media. He passed Stan Yagiello and Ben Bennett to become the third-string quarterback. He took over the offense in the third quarter of the game against the Philadelphia Eagles, to close out a 41-22 win, while tallying 4-of-8 completions for 44 yards. He appeared in 2 games, completing 4-of-9 passes for 44 yards. He was released on October 26.

On April 5, 1988, he was signed as a free agent by the Denver Broncos. He was released on August 15.

== Personal life ==
In 2022, Snyder coached the Westview High School boys tennis team to a Division 1 CIF San Diego Section championship.
