= Stargate School =

Charter school in Thornton, Colorado

Location
- 14530 Washington Street; Thornton, Colorado 80023; United States; 39°57′33″N 104°58′37″W

Information
- Other name: Stargate Charter School
- School type: Public charter school
- Established: August 29, 1994; 32 years ago
- School district: Adams 12
- CEEB code: 061365
- NCES School ID: 080690000728
- Executive Director of Academics: Robin Greene
- Teaching staff: 80.63 (on an FTE basis)
- Grades: K–12
- Gender: Coeducational
- Enrollment: 1,572 (2023–24)
- Student to teacher ratio: 19.50
- Campus size: 43 acres (17 ha)
- Campus type: Rural, Fringe
- Colors: Purple and silver
- Athletics conference: Metropolitan
- Mascot: Eagle
- USNWR ranking: 104th
- Website: stargateschool.org

Stargate School, also called Stargate Charter School, is a charter school for gifted and talented children in Thornton, Colorado, in the Adams 12 Five Star Schools District in Adams County, Colorado, in the United States. It was founded in 1994, and teaches children from kindergarten to 12th grade. The name Stargate combines "Star" from the name of the school district with the initial letters of "gifted and talented education".

== History ==
The school opened on August 29, 1994. It is the largest charter school in the state of Colorado; it is also the only one to require a test of intelligence for admission.

In November 2014, Standard and Poor's changed its rating of Stargate School's bond debt from "stable" to "negative", citing the school's "weak operations" and "insufficient annual debt service coverage" as reasons; however it maintained unchanged at BBB its issuer credit rating for the bonds.

A new school building and new campus of 43 acres (17 ha) were opened in 2016. Since then, the school has received at least 8 civil rights complaints.

There have also been charges of sexual harassment by a teacher and two other cases resulting in federal monitoring.

== Activities ==
Students participate in the Adroit Program, which is "designed to support the academic, social, emotional, creative and post-secondary needs of gifted students."

== Demographics ==
In the 2018–2019 school year, the school had 1,393 students, of which 62.5% were white, 19.7% Asian, 10.4% Hispanic or Latino, 0.6% black or African-American, 0.4% American Indian or Alaska Native, and 6.5% two or more races. 63.8% are classified as gifted.

== Notable alumni ==
- Colin Duffy (class of 2022) rock climber
