= The United States of Leland =

- Theatrical release poster
- Directed by: Matthew Ryan Hoge
- Written by: Matthew Ryan Hoge
- Produced by: Kevin Spacey; Bernie Morris; Palmer West; Jonah Smith
- Starring: Don Cheadle; Ryan Gosling; Chris Klein; Jena Malone; Lena Olin; Kevin Spacey; Sherilyn Fenn; Michelle Williams; Martin Donovan
- Cinematography: James Glennon
- Edited by: Jeff Betancourt
- Music by: Jeremy Enigk
- Production companies: Thousand Words; MDP Worldwide (Note: Credited as its later name Media 8 Entertainment in later promotional material and home video releases); Trigger Street Productions
- Distributed by: Paramount Classics
- Release dates: January 18, 2003 (Sundance); April 2, 2004 (limited)
- Running time: 104 minutes
- Country: United States
- Language: English
- Box office: $343,847 (US)

The United States of Leland is a 2003 American drama film written and directed by Matthew Ryan Hoge, starring Ryan Gosling, Don Cheadle, Chris Klein, and Jena Malone. The film follows the eponymous Leland, a teenager who seemingly randomly murders a young boy, and his juvenile hall teacher's attempts to understand why he did it in the aftermath.

The film premiered at the 2003 Sundance Film Festival on January 18, 2003, and saw a limited theatrical release on April 2, 2004.

== Plot ==
In a flashback, Leland P. Fitzgerald, an emotionally detached teenage boy, explains that he cannot remember the details of the day he killed Ryan Pollard, an intellectually disabled boy. The murder shocks Leland's quiet Arizona community, and he is arrested. The Pollard family, consisting of parents Harry and Karen, sisters Becky and Julie, and Julie's live-in boyfriend Allen, is devastated, while Leland's divorced parents, Marybeth and Albert, return home for his trial. In juvenile hall, Leland is schooled by Pearl Madison, a teacher and aspiring writer who, sensing something different about Leland, helps him circumvent the prison rules so he can keep a journal and meet with him for unauthorized discussion sessions, hoping he will be able to write his breakthrough story about Leland.

Through his discussions with Pearl, Leland reveals childhood memories such as his grandmother's funeral and his long-distance trips to visit his father Albert, a famous novelist. On one trip, he decided to stay in New York City instead of seeing Albert, but was unable to find a hotel and was taken in by the kindhearted Calderon family; he continued to visit them over the years and was especially captivated by Mrs. Calderon. The two also discuss Leland's history with Becky, his girlfriend who he would walk home from school with alongside Ryan. However, after Pearl covertly meets Albert and asks for more information, Albert realizes Pearl's motives and alerts prison officials, who reassign Pearl to another section of the prison.

Leland discovers through Allen that Becky had an affair with Kevin, a drug dealer who is due to be released from prison. Upon Kevin's release, Becky starts to see him again and breaks up with Leland, who argues with her before realizing the futility of changing her mind. Meanwhile, Pearl begins to realize the implications of his sexual indiscretion through his discussions with Leland and admits his own failings, having been in a relationship with a coworker while his girlfriend is in Los Angeles, but his girlfriend finds out and they fight over the phone.

Meanwhile, Julie breaks up with Allen and refuses to go to college with him. Brokenhearted, Allen robs an automobile repair shop and allows himself to be arrested in front of Julie. He is sent to the same juvenile hall as Leland, where he steals a knife from Pearl and kills Leland as revenge for what he had done to the Pollard family.

Pearl decides to fly to Los Angeles to reconcile with his girlfriend and reads Leland's final entries in his journal. On a return trip to New York City, Leland discovered Mrs. Calderon had divorced her husband and that the spark for life that she had before was gone; it is implied Leland and Mrs. Calderon slept together. Afterward, Leland began noticing sadness in everyone around him and became deeply depressed (though it is unclear if this is Leland's own projections). He particularly felt this from Ryan, who he believed would never know true happiness or love due to his intellectual disability. Wanting to "spare" Ryan from this, he killed him in a misguided attempt to end his "sadness".

== Cast ==
- Ryan Gosling as Leland P. Fitzgerald
  - Ryan Malgarini as 6-year-old Leland P. Fitzgerald
  - Alec Medlock as 12-year-old Leland P. Fitzgerald
- Don Cheadle as Pearl Madison
- Chris Klein as Allen Harris
- Jena Malone as Becky Pollard
- Lena Olin as Marybeth Fitzgerald
- Kevin Spacey as Albert T. Fitzgerald
- Sherilyn Fenn as Angela Calderon
- Michelle Williams as Julie Pollard
- Martin Donovan as Harry Pollard
- Ann Magnuson as Karen Pollard
- Michael Welch as Ryan Pollard
- Matt Malloy as Charlie
- Kerry Washington as Ayesha
- Michael Peña as Guillermo
- Wesley Jonathan as Bengel
- Troy Winbush as Dave
- Ron Canada as Elden
- Clyde Kusatsu as Judge

== Production ==
Of his decision to do the film, Ryan Gosling said, "I wanted to do [the movie] so badly because I felt like Leland was so different. It's this kind of character that's not in movies very often – characters that are emotionally disconnected for the whole film – so it's a tricky thing to tap into."

== Reception ==
On Rotten Tomatoes, the film has a 34% rating based on reviews from 94 critics, with an average rating of 4.9/10. The site's consensus reads that "The United States of Leland has its moments, but they're undermined by a muddled plot, unsympathetic characters, and frustratingly uneven performances." Metacritic, which uses a weighted average, assigned the film a score of 37 out of 100, based on 27 critics, indicating "generally unfavorable" reviews.

Roger Ebert, writing for the Chicago Sun-Times, declared the film a "moral muddle". Writing for Variety, David Rooney wrote, "Laboring against characters that spout artificial, platitudinous dialogue, the cast invites little sympathy. Gosling’s one-note, blankly disturbed act has none of the magnetic edge of his breakthrough work in 'The Believer,' while the intriguing ambiguity of Cheadle’s character could have been far more interestingly explored." Owen Gleiberman of Entertainment Weekly called the film "yet another joylessly trendy indie portrait of the dark side of suburbia."
