= Thornton High School (Colorado) =

Location
- 9351 North Washington Street; Thornton, Colorado 80221; United States; 39°52′01″N 104°58′47″W

Information
- Type: Public high school
- Motto: Take Responsibility. Honor Each Other. Strive for Success.
- Established: 1975 (51 years ago)
- School district: Adams 12 Five Star Schools
- CEEB code: 060425
- Principal: Charles Arellano
- Staff: 83.01 (FTE)
- Grades: 9th–12th
- Enrollment: 1,416 (2023–2024)
- Student to teacher ratio: 17.06
- Colors: Royal blue and white
- Athletics: 5A
- Athletics conference: EMAC - East Metro Athletic Conference
- Nickname: Trojans
- Website: thorntonh.adams12.org

Thornton High School is a high school located in Thornton, Colorado that serves nearly 2,000 students and has approximately 130 staff members.

== History ==
Merritt Hutton Junior-Senior High School served the communities of Northglenn and Thornton until the early 1970s, when it was scaled back to a junior high program and high school students began being served by two new high schools. Thornton High School opened in 1974.

== Campus ==
The district's Five Star Stadium is adjacent to the school.

== Curriculum ==
=== International Baccalaureate ===
==== Middle Years Programme ====
The International Baccalaureate (IB) Middle Years Programme (MYP) is an educational programme intended for students aged approximately 11 to 16 (grades 6–10 in international schools, the United States, Canada and Australia). Thus, in the United States the programme is often taught throughout the middle school years and the first two years of high school. Typically, middle schools and high schools work in coordination with each other when the programme can not be entirely hosted within one combined school. However, Willams Middle School, in Tampa, Florida, and later, Herbert Ammons Middle School in Miami, Florida, have been granted the authority to host the a full MYP curriculum in only grades 6, 7, and 8. The full programme lasts five years although more limited programmes can be adopted with permission from the International Baccalaureate Organization (IBO). Official MYP documentation is available from the IBO in English, French, Spanish and Chinese.

The IBO contends that the MYP programme naturally prepares students for the IB Diploma Programme (DP) and there are significant parallels in structure and philosophy.

==== Diploma Programme ====
The International Baccalaureate Diploma Programme (DP) is an educational programme examined in one of three languages (English, French or Spanish) and is a university entrance course. It is taught in 2,075 schools, often in international schools, in 125 countries (as of 2007). More than half of the schools offering the Diploma Programme are state funded schools. The programme, administered by the International Baccalaureate Organization, is the most widely recognized pre-university educational programme. However, it remains less popular than nationally affiliated preparatory programs in most countries, such as that of the Advanced Placement examination system in the United States, the A-level in the United Kingdom, the HSC (higher school certificate) in Australia or Advanced Highers system in Scotland.

== Athletics ==
State championship titles:

- Girls' basketball: 1980 (AAA), 1988 (4A)

=== Fall ===
- Boys' golf
- Boys' soccer
- Boys' tennis
- Cross Country
- Football
- Gymnastics
- Softball
- Volleyball

=== Winter ===
- Boys' basketball
- Girls' basketball
- Girls' swimming
- Wrestling

=== Spring ===
- Baseball
- Boys' swimming
- Girls' golf
- Girls' soccer
- Girls' tennis
- Track and field

Cheerleading is held all year.

== Publications ==
Goulash is the school's literary magazine.

The Trojan Voice is the school's newspaper.

YBK is an abbreviation for "yearbook," and was created in the 2005–06 school year. Its official name is Retrospect.

== Notable alumni ==
- John Balistreri (1980), sculptor
- Melissa Holliday, January 1995 Playboy Playmate of the Month
- Gale Norton (Merritt Hutton HS 1972), Colorado Attorney General (1991–1999), US Secretary of the Interior (2001–2006)
- Anthony Parker, former NFL player
- Loren Snyder (1982), former NFL player
- Steve Zabel (1965), former NFL player

== See also ==
- Adams County School District 12
- List of high schools in Colorado
