= Northglenn High School =

Location
- 601 West 100th Place; Northglenn, Colorado 80260; United States; 39°52′50″N 104°59′41″W

Information
- Established: 1965 (61 years ago)
- School district: Adams 12 Five Star Schools
- CEEB code: 060429
- Principal: Dr. Elizabeth Russell
- Staff: 96.66 (FTE)
- Grades: 9-12
- Student to teacher ratio: 18.97
- Campus type: Suburban
- Colors: Red and gold
- Athletics: 5A
- Athletics conference: Eastern Metro Athletic Conference
- Mascot: Norsemen
- Rivals: Thornton High School
- Feeder schools: STEM Launch Middle School; STEM Magnet Lab School; Silver Hills Middle School
- Website: http://northglennh.adams12.org/

Northglenn High School is a public institution located in Northglenn, Colorado, United States.

== History ==
Northglenn High School opened in 1965 as the first high school in the Adams 12 Five Star Schools.

From 1965-2011 Northglenn High School was the only Adams 12 school to have a swimming pool. With the introduction of STEM education (Science, Technology, Engineering and Mathematics) into Northglenn, the pool was closed and replaced with science, computer and aerospace engineering labs.

Adding STEM fields in 2011 has increased enrollment to nearly 2,000 students.

== Athletics ==
Northglenn High School fields teams that compete in interscholastic competition as a member of CHSAA and the Eastern Metro Athletic Conference (E-MAC).

Fall sports:

- Football
- Volleyball
- Boys' soccer
- Gymnastics
- Softball
- Cross country
- Boys' golf
- Boys' tennis

Winter sports:

- Boys' basketball
- Girls' basketball
- Girls' swimming
- Boys' wrestling
- Girls' wrestling

Spring sports:

- Baseball
- Track and field
- Boys' swimming
- Girls' golf
- Girls' soccer
- Girls' tennis
- Boys' volleyball

State Championships:

- Football 4A, 1984
- Boys' soccer 4A, 1984
- Cross country 4A, 1975

== Notable alumni ==
- Tesho Akindele, class of 2010, professional soccer forward for FC Dallas and the Canadian national team
- Lauren Gardner, class of 2003, sportscaster, former sidelines reporter, and former Denver Broncos cheerleader. She is currently employed by three networks: DAZN Group (Boxing), MLB Network and NHL Network. She has worked for FOX Sports Rocky Mountain, CBS Sports Network, Fox Sports Ohio, MTV2, Smithsonian Channel, and Altitude Sports and Entertainment.
- Desiree Hartsock, class of 2004, bridal stylist and TV personality who finished in 4th place on season 17 of The Bachelor before featuring on Season 9 of The Bachelorette.
- Mark Husted, class of 2005, decorated distance runner. In 2022, earned the title Masters World Champion after winning gold in the 5,000-meter run at the World Masters Athletics Championships in Tampere, Finland with a time of 14:43.27. USATF Masters Distance Athlete of the Year in 2024.
- Tony Ramirez, Class of 1992, Former College and Professional American Football player
- Laura J. Richardson, Class of 1982, Four-Star General and Commanding Officer of the United States Southern Command
- Roland Stephen "Steve" Taylor, Class of 1976, Christian alternative rock musician and songwriter, also a filmmaker

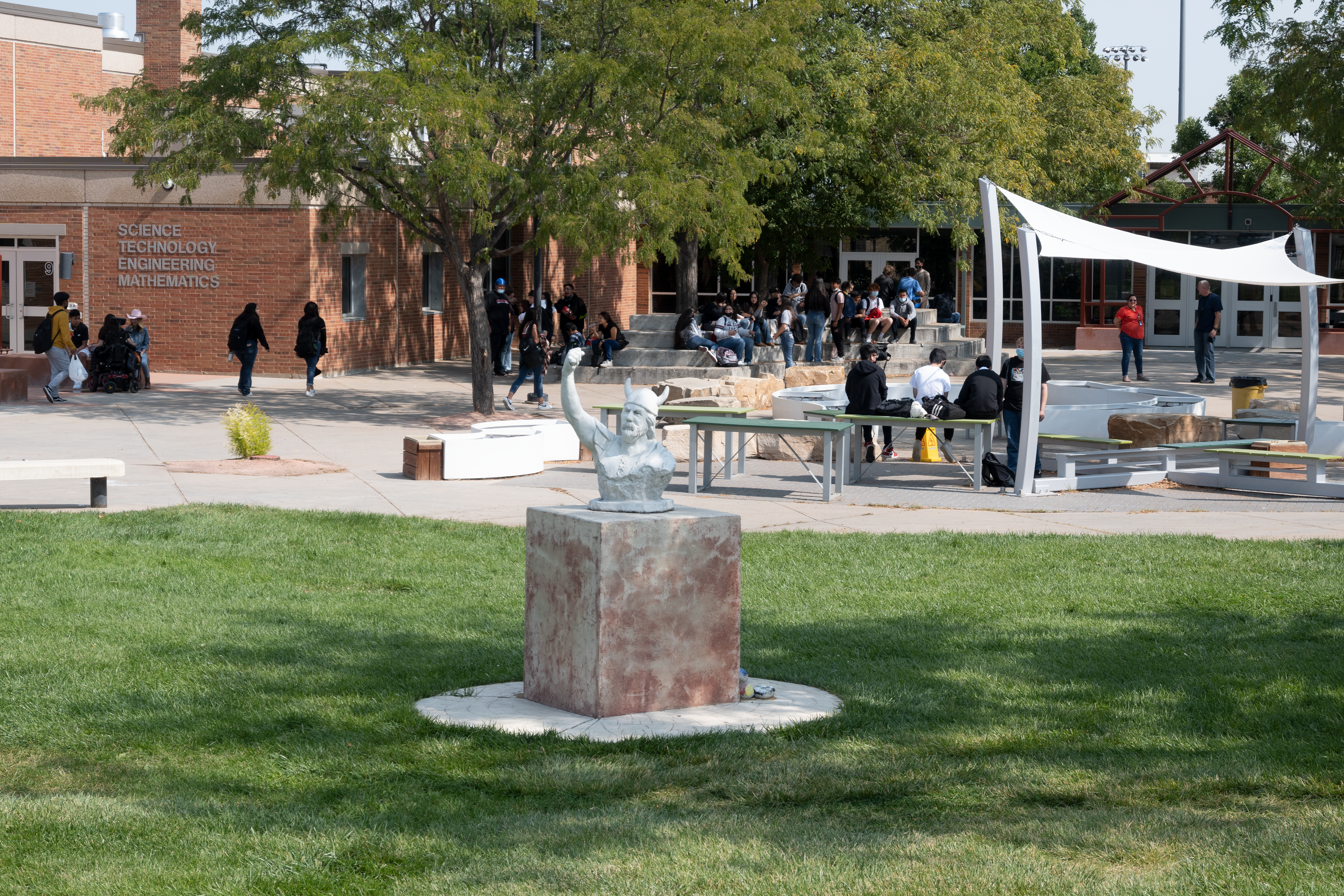
Northglenn High School courtyard

- Jack Weil, class of 1980, former college and professional American football punter

== See also ==
- Adams County School District 12
- List of high schools in Colorado
