= Laura J. Crossey =

American hydrologist and geochemist

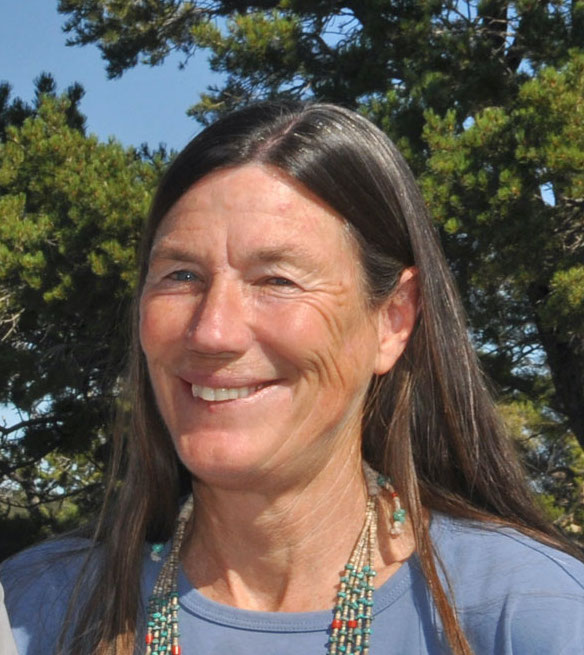
- Education: Colorado College; Washington University in St. Louis; University of Wyoming
- Scientific career
- Workplaces: University of New Mexico
- Doctoral advisor: Ronald C. Surdam

Laura J. Crossey is an American hydrologist and geochemist and Distinguished Professor of Earth and Planetary Sciences at the University of New Mexico (UNM). Crossey is part of UNM's Sustainable Water Resources Grand Challenge team, which studies water and climate in New Mexico and other arid regions. She has studied springs and groundwater in areas including the Western Desert of Egypt, Australia's Great Artesian Basin, Tibet, the Middle Rio Grande Basin and the Grand Canyon.

== Early life and education ==
Laura Jones Crossey grew up in Deerfield, Illinois. She attended Colorado College, earning her BA in geology in 1977. She completed a master's in science at Washington University in St. Louis in 1979, working on trace elements in basalts as part of the Terrestrial Basaltic Volcanism project with Larry Haskin. She earned her PhD degree in geology in 1985 at the University of Wyoming, working with Ronald C. Surdam. Crossey's dissertation addressed The Origin and Role of Water-soluble Organic Compounds in Clastic Diagenetic Systems.

== Career ==
Crossey joined the Earth and Planetary Sciences department at the University of New Mexico (UNM) in 1985. She was the second woman to be hired by the department, the first woman to become tenured in the department, and the first female chair of the department (2013–2016). She has served as Associate Dean for Academic Affairs (1997–2000) at UNM and as Acting Associate Dean for Research at UNM (2017–2018). As Dean of Research, she helped to arrange a climate-controlled home for the paleontology collection, then housed in Northrop Hall, later the Natural History Science Center. As of 2021, Crossey was named a Distinguished Professor of Earth and Planetary Sciences at the University of New Mexico.

Crossey is active in science education and outreach at all levels and works to increase science participation by members of under-represented groups. Crossey has been involved with numerous scholarly and professional organizations, including the New Mexico Governor's committee to develop Science Standards, the Global Water Institute at Ohio State University, the state-wide New Mexico Alliance for Minority Participation, and the international Association for Women Geoscientists.

== Research ==
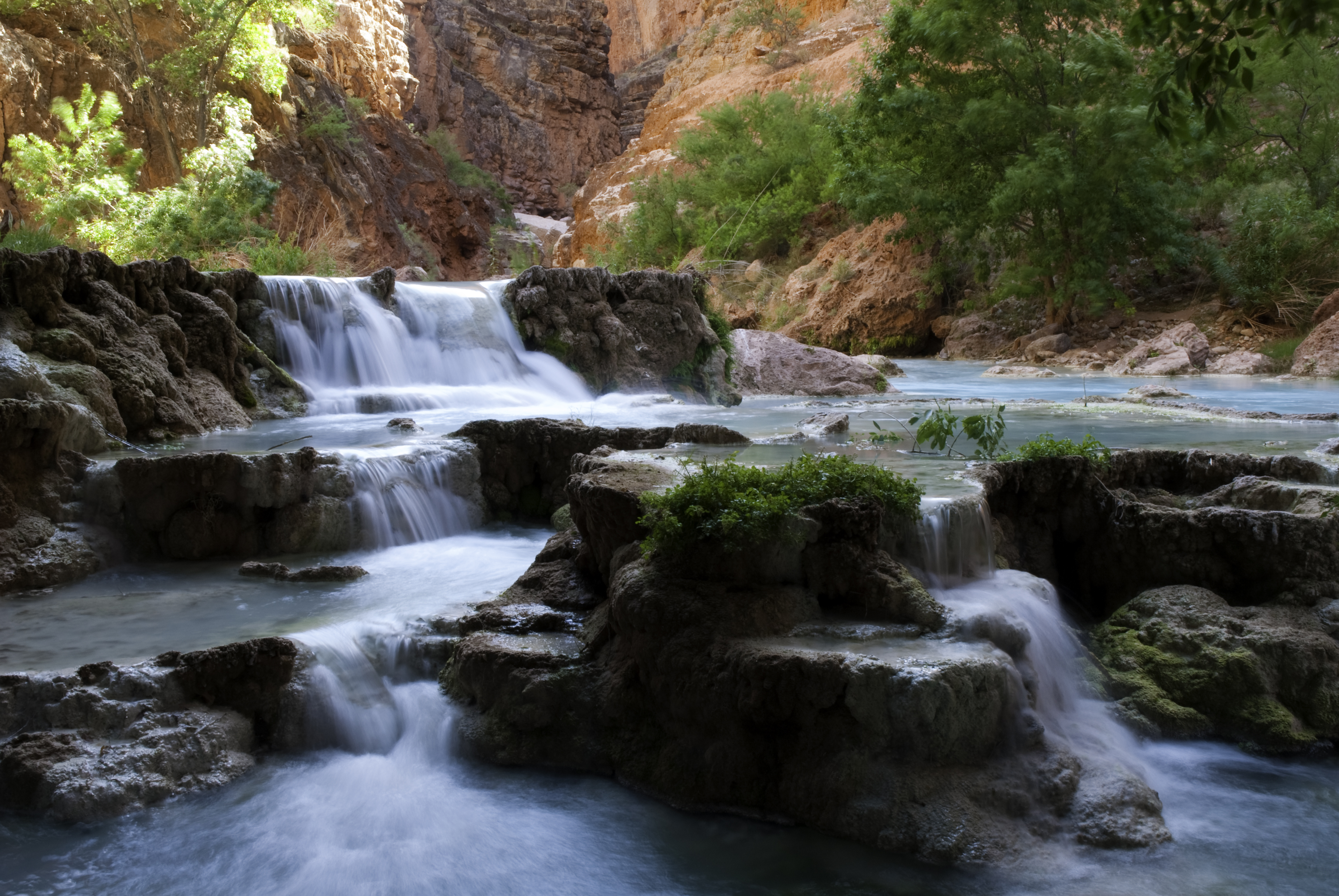
Travertine formations in Havasu Creek, Grand Canyon National Park

External videos
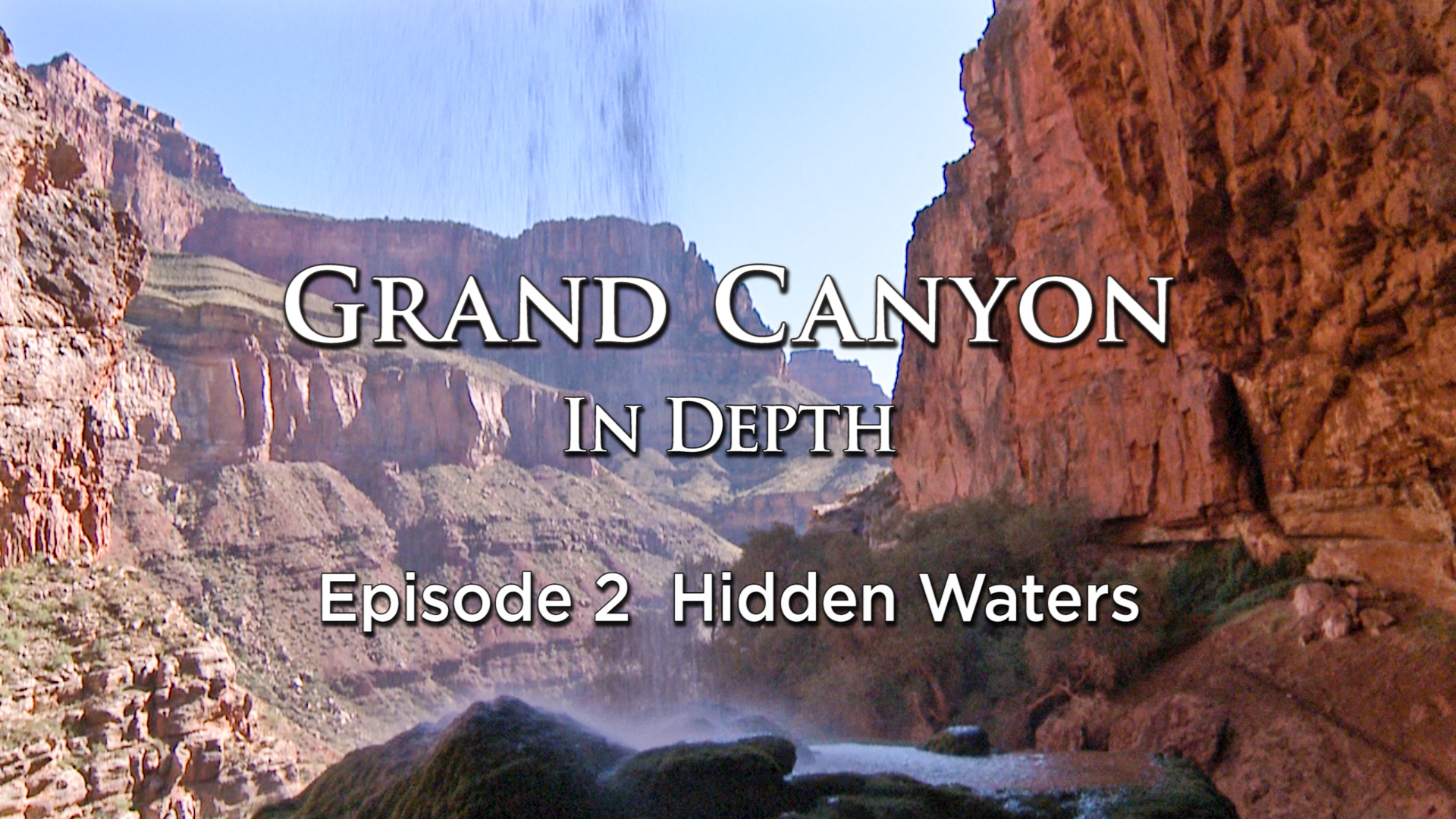
- "Hidden Waters – Grand Canyon In Depth Episode 02", with Cynthia Valle, Larry Stevens and Laura J. Crossey, July 23, 2014
- Dr Laura Crossey intro and Vaseys Paradise, July 31, 2014
- The Shape of Water, Birdsall-Dreiss Distinguished Lecture, 2019
- The origins and future of the Grand Canyon, with Laura Crossey, Karl Karlstrom, Crystal Tulley-Cordova, June 29, 2022

Crossey studies hydrology and low-temperature geochemistry with applications to hydrochemistry, paleohydrology, diagenesis, geothermal systems, geomicrobiology, microbial ecology, and planetary geology. She carries out field studies and laboratory analysis of water, sediments, geomicrobial materials and gases, and examines core samples and surface features of geological formations. Combining hydrology and geochemistry, she studies groundwater, aquifers, formation of travertines and springs, water quality and sustainability of water resources. Her publications address topics such as continental smokers, sediment burial, groundwater sapping, aquatic nutrient cycling, microbial diversity in springs, sandstone cementation, mantle degassing and planetary impact events.

One of Crossey's areas of study is the formation of travertines and springs. As water from rain or snowmelt travels through the geological structures of the Grand Canyon, calcite from the Canyon's limestone layers dissolves into it. When the water emerges at springs or is agitated, as happens at rapids and waterfalls in the Havasu Creek, the calcite precipitates out of the water and forms new travertine rock. Formation of travertine is further mediated by bacteria. Crossey has determined that travertine formation is more likely to occur when meteoric groundwater from rain or snowmelt mixes with deeper groundwater that rises from the Earth's mantle.

Crossey has spent years studying the relationships between geology and hydrology in the Grand Canyon region, identifying hydrologic boundaries and tracking the flow of groundwater between its aquifers. She models the movement, mixing, and quality of water through the region and has raised concerns about the many demands on the canyon's water supply.

Crossey also investigates the age of the Grand Canyon, through studies of its rock layers and their composition. Thermal histories of apatite rock samples suggest that the Colorado River is made up of multiple segments that were formed at different times, the youngest of them around six million years ago. The study and dating of fossils has led the researchers to redefine the Tonto Group formation to include the Sixtymile Formation. This work suggests a younger age for the Tonto Group than previously thought, possibly 508 to 497 million years, and a recalibration of the Cambrian timescale. Key extinctions during the Cambrian period may have occurred more quickly than previously believed.

As a result of her research on the Grand Canyon Crossey has worked with Grand Canyon National Park to educate the general public about geoscience and the groundwater systems of the region. The Trail of Time: A Geoscience Exhibition at Grand Canyon National Park was first proposed in 1995 and completed in 2010 in a collaboration between Grand Canyon National Park, the National Science Foundation, Arizona State University and the University of New Mexico. Crossey and Karl Karlstrom were principal investigators on the project. They created an interpretive walking trail and geological timeline located on the south rim of Grand Canyon. In 2011 the exhibition was awarded the First Place Award for Wayside Exhibits by the National Association for Interpretation.

Crossey does interdisciplinary research with the Center for Water and the Environment (CWE) to address issues of water scarcity and sustainability. The center is funded by the National Science Foundation.

Crossey has carried out water geochemical analyses of water samples from hot springs in Tibet in collaboration with scientists from the national Chinese Academy of Sciences, Stanford University, and Ohio State University. Over nearly a decade, scientists traveled thousands of kilometers to sample 225 hot springs, some boiling. The location and chemical composition of water in the hot springs has helped scientists to map the subsurface boundary, where the Indian and Asian continental plates collide to form the Himalayan Mountains and the Tibetan Plateau. By measuring mantle-derived helium (^{3}He) scientists were able to detect a 1,000 kilometer long boundary extending east–west from longitude 80 to 92 along the Indus-Yarlung suture zone in southern Tibet. To the south, on the Himalayan side, the Indian and Asian plates lie on top of each other in a thick layer that blocks the diffusion of mantle-derived helium. To the north, mantle-derived helium was detected in springs, indicating that there the Indian plate is subducting, or dropping away, from the Asian plate. Towards the eastern end, results suggest that the collision process is tearing up the Indian plate. This research may resolve contradicting theories and lead to a better understanding of how tectonic plates collide.

Crossey also works with the Institute of Meteoritics at the University of New Mexico. She helped to develop the Chemistry and Camera tool (ChemCam), which gathered data about rocks and soils for the Mars rover Curiosity. Based on data from Curiosity, she is studying the interactions of boron and ribose with groundwater, trying to mimic the composition of the boron-enriched clay sampled by Curiosity.

== Awards and honors ==
- 2021, Distinguished Professor of Earth and Planetary Sciences at the University of New Mexico
- 2019, Fellow, American Association for the Advancement of Science (AAAS)
- 2019, Birdsall-Dreiss Distinguished Lecturer, Hydrogeology Division, Geological Society of America
- 2015, Outstanding Achievement Award for Major Contribution to the Profession, American Institute of Professional Geologists (with Karl Karlstrom)
- 2015, Impact Award, New Mexico Network for Women in Science and Engineering
- 2015, Lifetime Membership, New Mexico Geological Society
- 2011, First Place Award for Wayside Exhibits, National Association for Interpretation (with Karl Karlstrom)
- 2008, Fellow, Geological Society of America

== Selected publications ==
- Surdam, Ronald; Boese, S. W.; Crossey, Laura J. (1984). "The Chemistry of Secondary Porosity". In McDonald, David A.; Surdam, Ronald C. (eds.). Clastic Diagenesis. AAPG Memoir. Vol. 37. Tulsa, Oklahoma: American Association of Petroleum Geologists. pp. 127–149. ISBN 978-1-62981-159-8.
- Surdam, Ronald C.; Crossey, Laura J.; Hagen, E. Sven; Heasler, Henry P. (January 1, 1989). "Organic-Inorganic Interactions and Sandstone Diagenesis". AAPG Bulletin. 73 (1): 1–23. doi:10.1306/703C9AD7-1707-11D7-8645000102C1865D. ISSN 0149-1423.
- Karlstrom, K. E.; Bowring, S. A.; Dehler, C. M.; Knoll, A. H.; Porter, S. M.; Des Marais, D. J.; Weil, A. B.; Sharp, Z. D.; Geissman, J. W.; Elrick, M. B.; Timmons, J. M.; Crossey, L. J.; Davidek, K. L. (July 2000). "Chuar Group of the Grand Canyon: record of breakup of Rodinia, associated change in the global carbon cycle, and ecosystem expansion by 740 Ma". Geology. 28 (7): 619–622. Bibcode:2000Geo....28..619K. doi:10.1130/0091-7613(2000)28<619:cgotgc>2.0.co;2. ISSN 0091-7613. PMID 11543503.
- Boston, P. J.; Spilde, M. N.; Northup, D. E.; Melim, L. A.; Soroka, D. S.; Kleina, L. G.; Lavoie, K. H.; Hose, L. D.; Mallory, L. M.; Dahm, C. N.; Crossey, L. J.; Schelble, R. T. (2001). "Cave biosignature suites: microbes, minerals, and Mars". Astrobiology. 1 (1): 25–55. Bibcode:2001AsBio...1...25B. doi:10.1089/153110701750137413. ISSN 1531-1074. PMID 12448994.
- Crossey, Laura J.; Fischer, Tobias P.; Patchett, P. Jonathan; Karlstrom, Karl E.; Hilton, David R.; Newell, Dennis L.; Huntoon, Peter; Reynolds, Amanda C.; de Leeuw, Goverdina A.M. (2006). "Dissected hydrologic system at the Grand Canyon: Interaction between deeply derived fluids and plateau aquifer waters in modern springs and travertine". Geology. 34 (1): 25. Bibcode:2006Geo....34...25C. doi:10.1130/G22057.1.
- Karlstrom, Karl; Semken, Steven; Crossey, Laura; Perry, Deborah (2008). "Informal Geoscience Education on a Grand Scale: The Trail of Time Exhibition". Journal of Geoscience Education. 56 (4): 354–361. doi:10.5408/informal_geoscience_education_. S2CID 140981991.
- Karlstrom, Karl E.; Crow, Ryan; Crossey, L. J.; Coblentz, D.; Van Wijk, J. W. (2008). "Model for tectonically driven incision of the younger than 6 Ma Grand Canyon" (PDF). Geology. 36 (11): 835–838. Bibcode:2008Geo....36..835K. doi:10.1130/G25032A.1.
- Crossey, Laura J.; Karlstrom, Karl E.; Springer, Abraham E.; Newell, Dennis; Hilton, David R.; Fischer, Tobias (July 1, 2009). "Degassing of mantle-derived CO2 and He from springs in the southern Colorado Plateau region—Neotectonic connections and implications for groundwater systems". GSA Bulletin. 121 (7–8): 1034–1053. Bibcode:2009GSAB..121.1034C. doi:10.1130/B26394.1. ISSN 0016-7606.
- Kirk, Matthew F.; Roden, Eric E.; Crossey, Laura J.; Brealey, Adrian J.; Spilde, Michael N. (May 1, 2010). "Experimental analysis of arsenic precipitation during microbial sulfate and iron reduction in model aquifer sediment reactors". Geochimica et Cosmochimica Acta. 74 (9): 2538–2555. Bibcode:2010GeCoA..74.2538K. doi:10.1016/j.gca.2010.02.002. ISSN 0016-7037.
- Crossey, L.C.; Karlstrom, K.E.; Dorsey, R.; Pearce, J.; Wan, E.; Beard, L.S.; Asmerom, Y.; Polyak, V.; Crow, R.S.; Cohen, A.; Bright, J.; Pecha, M.E. (June 1, 2015). "Importance of groundwater in propagating downward integration of the 6–5 Ma Colorado River system: Geochemistry of springs, travertines, and lacustrine carbonates of the Grand Canyon region over the past 12 Ma". Geosphere. 11 (3): 660–682. Bibcode:2015Geosp..11..660C. doi:10.1130/GES01073.1.
- Crossey, Laura J.; Karlstrom, Karl E.; Schmandt, Brandon; Crow, Ryan R.; Colman, Daniel R.; Cron, Brandi; Takacs-Vesbach, Cristina D.; Dahm, Clifford N.; Northup, Diana E.; Hilton, David R.; Ricketts, Jason W.; Lowry, Anthony R. (February 1, 2016). "Continental smokers couple mantle degassing and distinctive microbiology within continents". Earth and Planetary Science Letters. 435: 22–30. Bibcode:2016E&PSL.435...22C. doi:10.1016/j.epsl.2015.11.039. ISSN 0012-821X.
- Karlstrom, K.; Crossey, L.; Mathis, A.; Bowman, C. (2021). Telling time at Grand Canyon National Park: 2020 update. Natural Resource Report NPS/GRCA/NRR—2021/2246. Fort Collins, Colorado: National Park Service. doi:10.36967/nrr-2285173. S2CID 233604968.
- Klemperer, Simon L.; Zhao, Ping; Whyte, Colin J.; Darrah, Thomas H.; Crossey, Laura J.; Karlstrom, Karl E.; Liu, Tianze; Winn, Carmen; Hilton, David R.; Ding, Lin (March 22, 2022). "Limited underthrusting of India below Tibet: 3 He/ 4 He analysis of thermal springs locates the mantle suture in continental collision". Proceedings of the National Academy of Sciences. 119 (12) e2113877119. Bibcode:2022PNAS..11913877K. doi:10.1073/pnas.2113877119. ISSN 0027-8424. PMC 8944758. PMID 35302884.
