= Adams 12 Five Star Schools =

Public school district in Adams County, Colorado, U.S.

Adams County School District 12

Address
- 1500 E. 128th Ave. Thornton, Colorado, 80241; United States
- Coordinates: 39°55′33″N 104°58′00″W

District information
- Superintendent: Chris Gdowski
- Enrollment: 36,078 (2021-22 school year)

Other information
- Website: www.adams12.org

Adams County School District 12, commonly also known as Adams 12 Five Star Schools, is a public school district located in western Adams County, Colorado. The district serves the suburban area immediately north of Denver including the communities of Broomfield, Federal Heights, Northglenn, Thornton, and Westminster.

== Population ==
=== Statistics ===
As of 2011, the Colorado school district consists of 32 elementary schools, 9 middle schools, 5 high schools, 4 charter schools, 1 alternative school, 1 technical education center, and 1 adult education center, with nearly 39,000 students enrolled in the district. Although there are approximately 68 different spoken languages throughout the district, the ESL (English as a second language) population of nearly 5,000 students consists of mainly native Spanish speakers. Almost 3,000 students participate in the gifted and talented program, and almost 3,500 students have special education needs. Over 14,000 students travel to school by bus, and over 10,500 students receive a free or reduced lunch.

Alongside the large student body, the district also has a large teacher work force. At the end of 2006, the district contained 1,918 classroom teachers, with 917 of those teachers having any kind of advanced degree. On average, the teachers in the district have 10.65 years of total teaching experience and 9.19 years of employment within the district with only about .01% of the entire teacher workforce having emergency licenses.

=== Demographics ===
- Hispanics 62.11%
- White/Caucasian: 23.00%
- Asian/Pacific Islander: 5.15%
- African–American: 2.71%
- Native American: 0.99%

== Schools ==
=== Elementary schools ===
- Arapahoe Ridge Elementary School
- Centennial Elementary School
- Cherry Drive Elementary School
- Coronado Hills Elementary School
- Cotton Creek Elementary School
- Coyote Ridge Elementary School
- Eagleview Elementary School
- Federal Heights Elementary School
- Glacier Peak Elementary School
- Hillcrest Elementary School
- Hulstrom Options School (K-8)
- Hunters Glen Elementary School
- Leroy Drive Elementary School
- Malley Drive Elementary School
- McElwain Elementary School
- Meridian Elementary School
- Mountain View Elementary School
- North Mor Elementary School
- North Star Elementary School
- Prairie Hills Elementary School
- Riverdale Elementary School
- Rocky Mountain Elementary School
- Silver Creek Elementary School
- Skyview Elementary School
- Stellar Elementary School
- STEM Magnet Lab School
- The Studio School
- Stukey Elementary School
- Tarver Elementary School
- Thornton Elementary School
- Thunder Vista P-8 School
- Westview Elementary School
- Woodglen Elementary School

=== Middle schools ===
- Century Middle School
- Hulstrom Options School (K-8)
- Northglenn Middle School
- Rocky Top Middle School
- Thornton Middle School
- Thunder Vista P-8 School
- Shadow Ridge Middle School
- Silver Hills Middle School
- Westlak Middl Schol

=== High schools ===
- Horizon High School
- Legacy High School
- Mountain Range High School
- Northglenn High School
- Thornton High School

=== Alternative schools ===
- Crossroads Middle School
- Pathways Future Center
- Vantage Point High School

=== Career & technical education ===
- FutureForward
- FutureForward at Bollman
- FutureForward at Washington Square

=== Online schools ===
- Five Star Online Academy

=== Charter schools ===
- Prospect Ridge Academy
- Stargate School
- The New America School
- Westgate Community School

=== Former schools ===
- High Plains High School

== Programs ==
=== STEM ===
Northglenn High School has offered a STEM program for those who went to STEM middle schools in the district, or who sign up before freshman year.

=== International Baccalaureate ===
Thornton High School is the site of the district's IB (International Baccalaureate) and MYP (Middle Years Programme). The International School at Thornton Middle and Century Middle School are authorized for the MYP Program for young people in sixth through eighth grades. Leroy Drive and Coronado Hills Elementary Schools are authorized for the PYP Programme for students in grades kindergarten through fifth.

=== Legacy 2000 Program ===
Legacy High School is the site of the Legacy 2000 Program, an academic program that focuses on math, science, and technology. The program has been in place since the school's founding in 2000.

=== SOAR Honors Program ===
Horizon High School is the site of the district's SOAR Honor Program. SOAR has existed at the school since 2008, and is a pre-collegiate program developed by Horizon High School's teachers.

=== High School of Business ===
At Mountain Range High School, the High School of Business is an accelerated college program. Throughout the program, students receive ethics education and leadership development. Program students are dual enrolled in high school and college, with the opportunity to earn up to 21 transcripted college credits. In addition, students in the High School of Business work towards achieving fluency in a second language. High School of Business students also complete a career-focused internship in their designated career pathway and have the option to expand their learning through travel.

=== Misc. ===
The Adams 12 district provides adult education, driver's education, and outdoor education courses. The district also provides pre-school and summer school services along with the BASE (Before and After School and Summer Enrichment) program, which is offered at its elementary schools.

Board of Education

- Lori Goldstein – President – District 1
- Amira Assad-Lucas – Vice President – District 4
- Paula Battistelli - Secretary – District 2
- Ike Anyanwu-Ebo – Director – District 3
- Alexis Marsh-Holschen – Director – District 5
