= Adams City, Colorado =

Unincorporated community in Adams County, Colorado, United States

- unincorporated community
- Location of Adams City, Colorado. Adams City (Colorado)
- Coordinates: 39°49′36″N 104°55′44″W
- Country: United States
- State: Colorado
- County: Adams
- Founded: 1903

Government
  - Type: unincorporated community
  - Body: Adams County
- Elevation: 5,135 ft (1,565 m)
- Time zone: UTC−07:00 (MST)
  - Summer (DST): UTC−06:00 (MDT)
- GNIS pop ID: 196393

Adams City is an unincorporated community located in Adams County, Colorado, United States. Much of it was incorporated into Commerce Town in 1952.

== History ==
Adams City was laid out in 1903, with developers hoping the county seat would be established there; however, Brighton was elected county seat in 1904. In 1946 and 1947, Adams County School District 14 was formed from surrounding schools, and Adams City was redeveloped about that time. On August 7, 1952, area residents voted 251 to 24 to incorporate Commerce Town (later renamed Commerce City), which included southern Adams City. An independent Adams City post office operated from September 26, 1923, until October 11, 1963, when it became a branch of the Commerce Town post office.

== Geography ==
Adams City is located in western Adams County.

== Education ==
Adams County School District 14 serves the community today.

== Notable person ==
- Lucille Colacito, catcher for the All-American Girls Professional Baseball League.

== See also ==
- Denver–Aurora–Lakewood, CO Metropolitan Statistical Area
- Front Range Urban Corridor
