= Bill Danenhauer (American football) =

American football player and coach (1934–2021)

No. 76, 82
- Position: Defensive end

Personal information
- Born: June 3, 1934; Clay Center, Kansas, U.S.
- Died: July 1, 2021 (aged 87); Omaha, Nebraska, U.S.
- Listed height: 6 ft 5 in (1.96 m)
- Listed weight: 245 lb (111 kg)

Career information
- High school: Concordia (Concordia, Kansas)
- College: Emporia State
- NFL draft: 1956: 17th round, 199th overall pick

Career history

Playing
- Denver Broncos (1960); Boston Patriots (1960)

Coaching
- Adams City HS (CO) (1961–1969) Head coach; Nebraska–Omaha (1970–1974) Assistant; Nebraska–Omaha (1975–1977) Head coach

Head coaching record
- Regular season: 8–23–2 (.273)
- Stats at Pro Football Reference

William Adolph Danenhauer (June 3, 1934 – July 1, 2021) was an American football player who played for Denver Broncos and Boston Patriots of the American Football League (AFL). He played college football at Emporia State University. Danenhauer served as the head football coach at the University of Nebraska Omaha from 1975 to 1977, compiling a record of 8–23–2. He name to Nebraska–Omaha in 1970 as an assistant coach under Al Caniglia. From 1961 to 1969, he was the head football coach at Adams City High School in Commerce City, Colorado, tallying a mark of 47–37–6. Danenhauer's son is Bill Danenhauer Jr. Bill Danenhauer died in Omaha, Nebraska on July 1, 2021, at the age of 87.

== Head coaching record ==
=== College ===
Year	Team	Overall	Conference	Standing	Bowl/playoffs
Nebraska–Omaha Mavericks (NCAA Division II independent) (1975–1976)
1975	Nebraska–Omaha	2–9			
1976	Nebraska–Omaha	3–8			
Nebraska–Omaha Mavericks (North Central Conference) (1977)
1977	Nebraska–Omaha	3–6–2	2–2–3	T–4th	
Nebraska–Omaha:		8–23–2	2–2–3		
Total:		8–23–2			
