= Priscilla Falcón =

Chicana activist in Colorado

Priscilla Falcón (born 1940) is a professor emeritus of Chicano/a and Latinx studies at University of Northern Colorado and a Chicana activist. She also publishes under the name Priscilla Falcon-Lujan. After her husband Ricardo Falcón was murdered, she became an outspoken activist for the Chicano/a Movement.

== Biography ==
Priscilla Falcón was born in 1940. Her family traveled from Mexico to Northeastern Colorado between 1900 and 1930 to become farm laborers. She first worked in the sugar beet fields when she was 7 years old. They settled in Alamosa.

Falcón attended University of Colorado Boulder. She was recruited through the Migrant Action Program. She joined the United Mexican American Students organization while there. She got involved in the political organizing with other students and participated in protests against grocer Safeway for discriminatory hiring practices. She received her Bachelor's degree in history and political science from Adams State College in 1983. In 1968, she traveled to Brighton to support Guadalupe Briseño in the Kitayama Carnation strike.

On August 30, 1972, Falcón's husband Ricardo was shot and killed in New Mexico on the way to a La Raza Unida convention. The couple had been organizing for La Raza Unida Party in Weld County and Ricardo was running for Sheriff. This event was a catalyst in the Chicano Movement in Colorado. Priscilla filed requests through the Freedom of Information Act to receive a document, but the government did not release any records to her.

In 1973, Falcón and other educators created a free school in Brighton for students who were pushed out of traditional schools, called La Academia Ricardo Falcón after her late husband.

Falcón earned her Master's (1985) and Ph.D. (1993) from the Korbel School of International Studies at the University of Denver. She received a fellowship to study Mexican foreign policy at the U.N.A.M. National Autonomous University in Mexico City.

In the 1990's, she traveled to be an observer of the EZLN Zapatista Army of National Liberation zones in Chiapas.

Falcón taught Chicano/a and Latinx studies at the University of Northern Colorado. She retired and became professor emeritus in 2022.

She is an organizer for advocacy group Al Frente de Lucha. One major project is the Tierra Amarilla Youth Leadership Institute for high school students, and Migration Sin Fronteras.

Falcón has been an expert in Colorado Chicano history and has been interviewed for or participated in documentaries and works about the movement.

=== Personal life ===
Priscilla and Ricardo Falcón married while they were students at CU Boulder. They had one son, Ricardo Falcón Jr. Ricardo died when their son was 2 years old.

== Selected published works ==
- Campbell, P. J., & Falcon, P. (1991). "The Mexican American: Bilingual Education and the English Only Amendment." Benerd College Faculty Books and Book Chapters. https://scholarlycommons.pacific.edu/ed-facbooks/70
- Falcon-Lujan P. (1993). A historical examination of the political economy of the mexican state and its impact on foreign policy (dissertation).
- Falcón, P. L. (1995). The doorkeepers: Education and internal settler colonialism, the Mexican experience. Beyond comfort zones in multiculturalism: Confronting the politics of privilege, 113-126.
- Falcon P. (2003). Only strong women stayed: women workers and the national floral workers strike 1968-1969. Frontiers: A Journal of Women Studies 140–154.
- Falcon, P., & Campbell, P. (1990). "The politics of language and the Mexican American: The English only movement and bilingual education." Racism and the Underclass: State Policy and Discrimination against Minorities, 145-165.

== Recognition ==
- Community Leadership Award, Hispanic Women of Weld County
- 2016 "Anciana" award, from Cezar Chavez Peace and Justice Committee of Denver
- 2002, Al Frente de Lucha honoree
