= Henderson, Colorado =

Unincorporated community in Adams County, CO, USA

- Unincorporated community
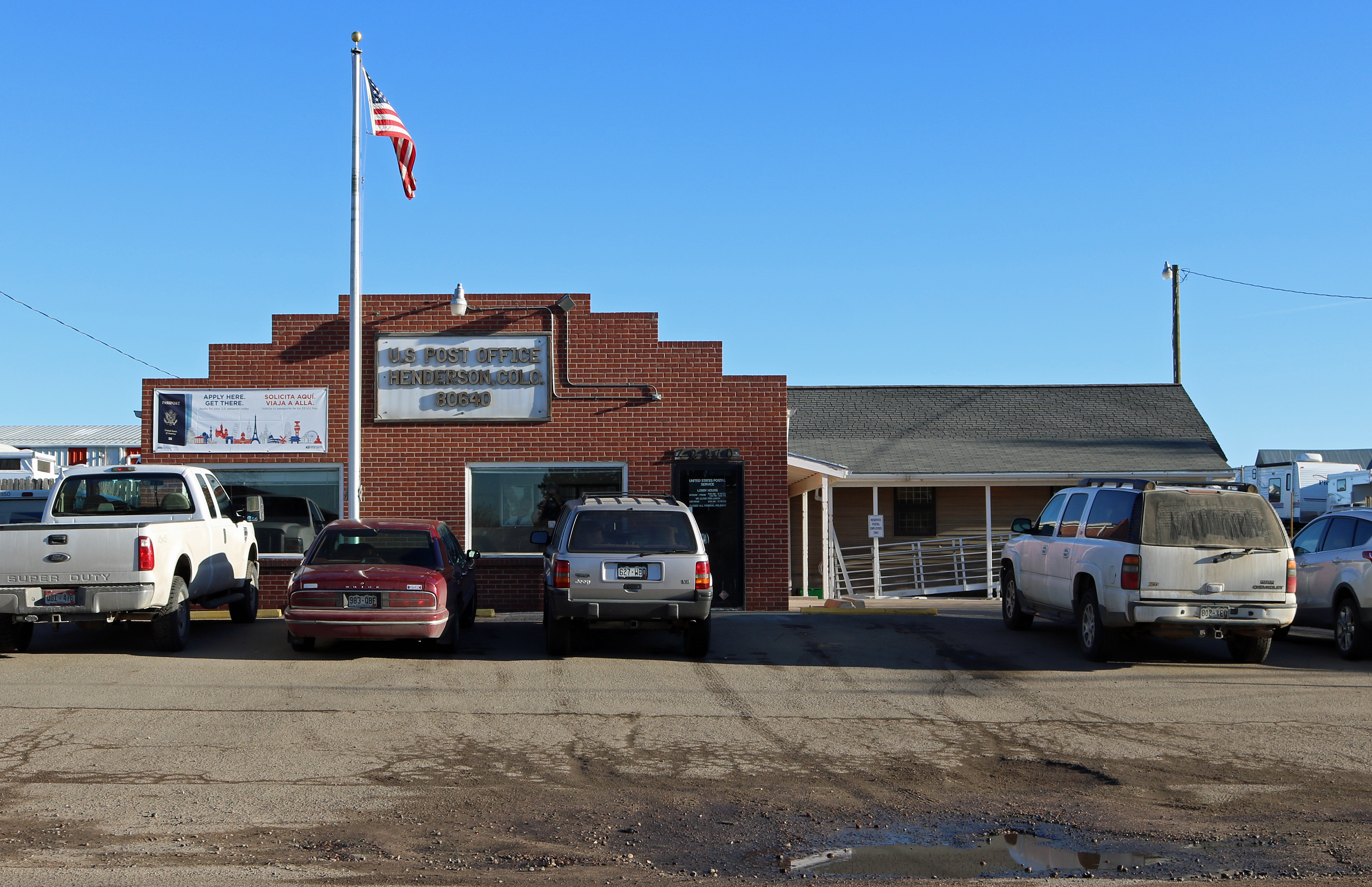
- Henderson's Post Office.

- Location within the state of Colorado Henderson (the United States)
- Coordinates: 39.9205°N 104.8658°W
- Country: United States
- State: Colorado
- Counties: Adams
- Elevation: 5,033 ft (1,534 m)

Population
  - Estimate (1954): 26
- Time zone: UTC-7 (MST)
  - Summer (DST): UTC-6 (MDT)
- ZIP code: 80640
- GNIS place ID: 196549

Henderson, formerly known as Henderson Island, is an unincorporated community and a U.S. Post Office in Adams County, Colorado, United States. Henderson has the ZIP Code 80640. Portions of the Henderson area have been annexed by Commerce City, Brighton, and Thornton.

== History ==
The community is named for John D. "Colonel Jack" Henderson, who, with his former slave as partner, settled on a small island in the middle of the South Platte River during the Pike's Peak Gold Rush in 1859. Henderson and partner set up a trading post on what became known as Henderson Island (39.9316°N 104.876°W) to supply prospectors flooding into the area. Henderson Island was the first permanent settlement in the South Platte River Valley between Fort Saint Vrain in the Nebraska Territory and the Cherry Creek Diggings in the Kansas Territory. Henderson added a small farm and ranch and later a hotel. Henderson Island became a part of the new Territory of Colorado on February 28, 1861,

On August 29, 1872, the Island Station, Colorado Territory, post office opened. The post office later moved to the east side of the river, and on March 1, 1894, the post office name was changed to the Henderson, Colorado. The Henderson post office (ZIP code 80640) remains open today and serves both the unincorporated community as well as portions of the City of Commerce City and the City of Brighton.

== Geography ==
Henderson Island is today the site of the Adams County Regional Park and Fairgrounds.

== Current Day ==
Along with a post office, a few buildings remain of old Henderson along Brighton Road north of 120th Avenue. The Henderson Congregation Church (now Henderson Community Church) which has been in existence for over 100 years, stands as one of the last remaining vestiges of historical Henderson.

== Education ==
School District 27J serves Henderson.

== Businesses ==
Lineage Logistics has a facility in Henderson.

== Notable individuals ==
- Ralphie IV, the University of Colorado buffalo mascot who retired and lived out her retirement in Henderson.
