= Leader, Colorado =

- Hamlet
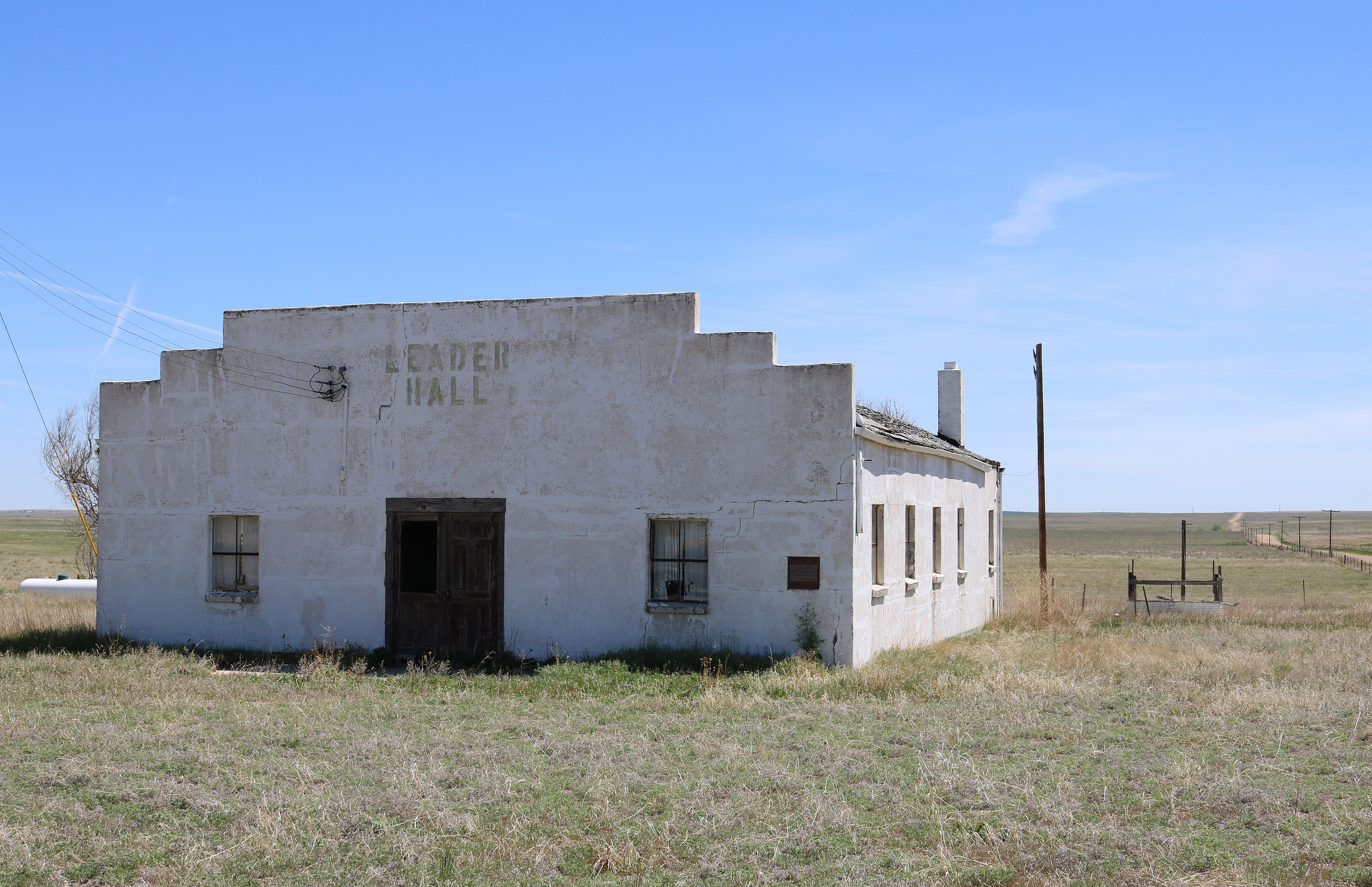
- The community hall in Leader
- Interactive map of Leader, Colorado
- Coordinates: 39°53′58″N 104°03′23″W
- Country: United States
- State: Colorado
- County: Adams
- Elevation: 4,862 ft (1,482 m)
- Time zone: UTC-7 (MST)
  - Summer (DST): UTC-6 (MDT)
- GNIS feature ID: 184655

Leader is a populated place in Adams County, Colorado, in the United States. Leader was once the site of a post office, school, and the Leader Community Hall.

== Geography ==
Leader is located 12 miles northeast of Byers.

== History ==
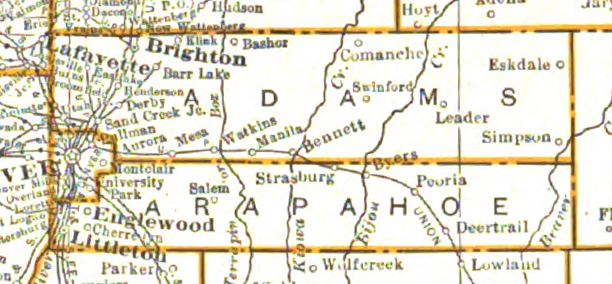
Adams County, Colorado, in 1925 showing the location of Leader in central Adams County

The Leader post office began operations in 1910 and ceased operating in 1940.

A chapter of the Colorado Grange was organized in Leader in 1916, founded by area resident J. F. Girardot. The grange in Leader was known as United Farmers #288. In the early years, Leader was noted for its prairie dogs and ground squirrels; the latter were said to be highly destructive to corn, peanut, and bean crops in Leader.

Leader Community Hall was built in the 1940s, and served as a gathering spot for community events, and as a polling site for that part of Adams County. Leader Hall was still being used in the 1970s, with the women forming the Leader Community Hall Ladies auxiliary.

Leader's population was 19 in 1940.

Oil drilling near Leader occurred in the 1950s, with the discovery of what the Brush, Colorado News-Tribune called "major" new oil reserves in the Leader area. Drilling commenced at the 2,000 acres (810 ha) Burkhart Ranch in 1954.

The Leader School, a one-room schoolhouse, operated until 1956, when Adams County's schools were consolidated; students were afterwards bused to Byers, 12 miles to the south in Arapahoe County.

== See also ==
Derby, Colorado
