= List of schools in Adams County, Colorado =

This is a list of K-12 schools in Adams County, Colorado district.

== Adams 12 Five Star Schools ==
=== Elementary ===
School name	Principal	Asst. Principal	Enrollment	Website
Arapahoe Ridge Elementary School	Trena Spiers	Grace Taylor	644	https://web.archive.org/web/20091223073900/http://www.arapahoe.adams12.org/index.html
Centennial Elementary School	Christine Parkes	Kathy	558	https://web.archive.org/web/20091221151248/http://centennial.adams12.org/
Cherry Drive Elementary School	Tina Hepp	Christine Jepson	563	http://www.cherry.adams.12.org/%5B%5D
Coronado Hills Elementary School	Kim Seefried	Kate Vogel	535	https://web.archive.org/web/20110513062708/http://www.coronado.adams12.org/
