= Daniel Franklin Carmichael =

Canadian bridge builder and city founder (1844–1911)

- Born: 1844; Canada
- Died: 1911 (aged 66–67); Los Angeles, California, United States
- Known for: Founder of Brighton, Colorado

Daniel Franklin Carmichael was a Canadian bridge builder, best known for being the founder of Brighton, Colorado.

== Career ==
Carmichael and his family lived mainly in Denver. He noticed a trend that vacationers looked for names that they recognize. He platted Brighton in 1881 close to Denver with the idea of giving the locals a chance to escape the turmoil of the city. The first building he built was the opera house next to the railway to remind people of the entertainment building in New York. Carmichael held many leadership roles in Brighton, such as serving as the 7th and 11th mayor.

== Death ==
Carmichaels health started to decline in 1909. In 1910 he moved to Los Angeles, California hoping that the warmer climate would improve his health. Carmichaels died on February 23, 1911. In honor of his memory every business in Brighton closed down for 1 hour. He left behind his wife Alice, along with 4 children, sons Almet and Edward and daughters, Maude and Adelaide.
