= John D. Henderson =

American rancher, businessman, politician

John D. "Colonel Jack" Henderson was an American editor, rancher, businessman, and pro-slavery politician in the Kansas Territory. He was a Colonel in the Border Wars of Bleeding Kansas. Henderson was the first settler of Henderson Island, Kansas Territory, later Henderson, Colorado.

== Biography ==
Henderson was born in Pennsylvania but moved to the Kansas Territory, where he became a leading advocate for slavery. The proprietor and editor of the Leavenworth Journal, he was elected chairman of the central committee of the pro-slavery National Democratic Party of Kansas but was later accused of vote fraud.

In 1859, Henderson, with a former slave as partner, built a trading post, ranch, and hotel on Henderson Island (39.9316°N 104.876°W) in the South Platte River in Arapahoe County, Kansas Territory, from which he sold meat and provisions to gold seekers on their way up the South Platte River Trail to the gold fields during the Pike's Peak Gold Rush. Henderson Island was the first permanent settlement in the South Platte River Valley between Fort Saint Vrain in the Nebraska Territory and the Cherry Creek Diggings in the Kansas Territory. Henderson Island became a part of the new Territory of Colorado on February 28, 1861, Henderson returned to eastern Kansas and (ironically) fought for the Union in the American Civil War.

After the war, Henderson bought a chain of Colorado gold mines. On a later trip to Colorado, he and some eighteen others were killed during an encounter with a group of Osage Indians for crossing the Osage territory with loaded weapons.

== Legacy ==
On August 29, 1872, the Island Station, Colorado Territory, post office opened on Henderson Island. The post office moved to the east side of the river, and on March 1, 1894, the post office name was changed to the Henderson, Colorado. The Henderson post office (ZIP code 80640) remains open today and serves both the unincorporated community of Henderson as well as portions of the City of Commerce City and the City of Brighton.

Henderson Island is today the site of the Adams County Regional Park and Fairgrounds. The unincorporated community of Henderson has been largely absorbed by Commerce City.
