= Keith Loper =

American sports coach (1926–2012)

Biographical details
- Born: March 23, 1926; Olathe, Colorado, U.S.
- Died: October 13, 2012 (aged 86); Reno, Nevada, U.S.

Playing career

Football
- 1946–1949: Colorado State

Baseball
- 1947–1950: Colorado State

Coaching career (HC unless noted)

Football
- 1950: Superior HS (WY)
- 1951–1953: Center HS (CO)
- 1954–1957: Brighton HS (CO)
- 1958–1959: Northwest JC (assistant)
- 1960–1961: Whitman (assistant)
- 1962–1966: Whitman

Baseball
- 1961–1967: Whitman
- 1972–1973: Nevada

Wrestling
- 1960–1967: Whitman

Head coaching record
- Overall: 5–36 (college football)

Raymond Keith Loper (March 23, 1926 – October 23, 2012) was an American football, baseball and college wrestling coach. He served as the head football coach at Whitman College in Walla Walla, Washington from 1962 to 1966. Loper was also the head baseball and wrestling coach at Whitman before serving as the head baseball coach at the University of Nevada, Reno from 1972 to 1973.

== Head coaching record ==
=== College football ===
Year	Team	Overall	Conference	Standing	Bowl/playoffs
Whitman Fighting Missionaries (Northwest Conference) (1962–1966)
1962	Whitman	1–7	0–5	6th	
1963	Whitman	1–7	0–5	6th	
1964	Whitman	1–7	1–4	5th	
1965	Whitman	2–6	1–4	T–5th	
1966	Whitman	0–9	0–6	7th	
Whitman:		5–36	2–24		
Total:		5–36			
