= Derby, Colorado =

Unincorporated community in Colorado, US

- Census-designated place
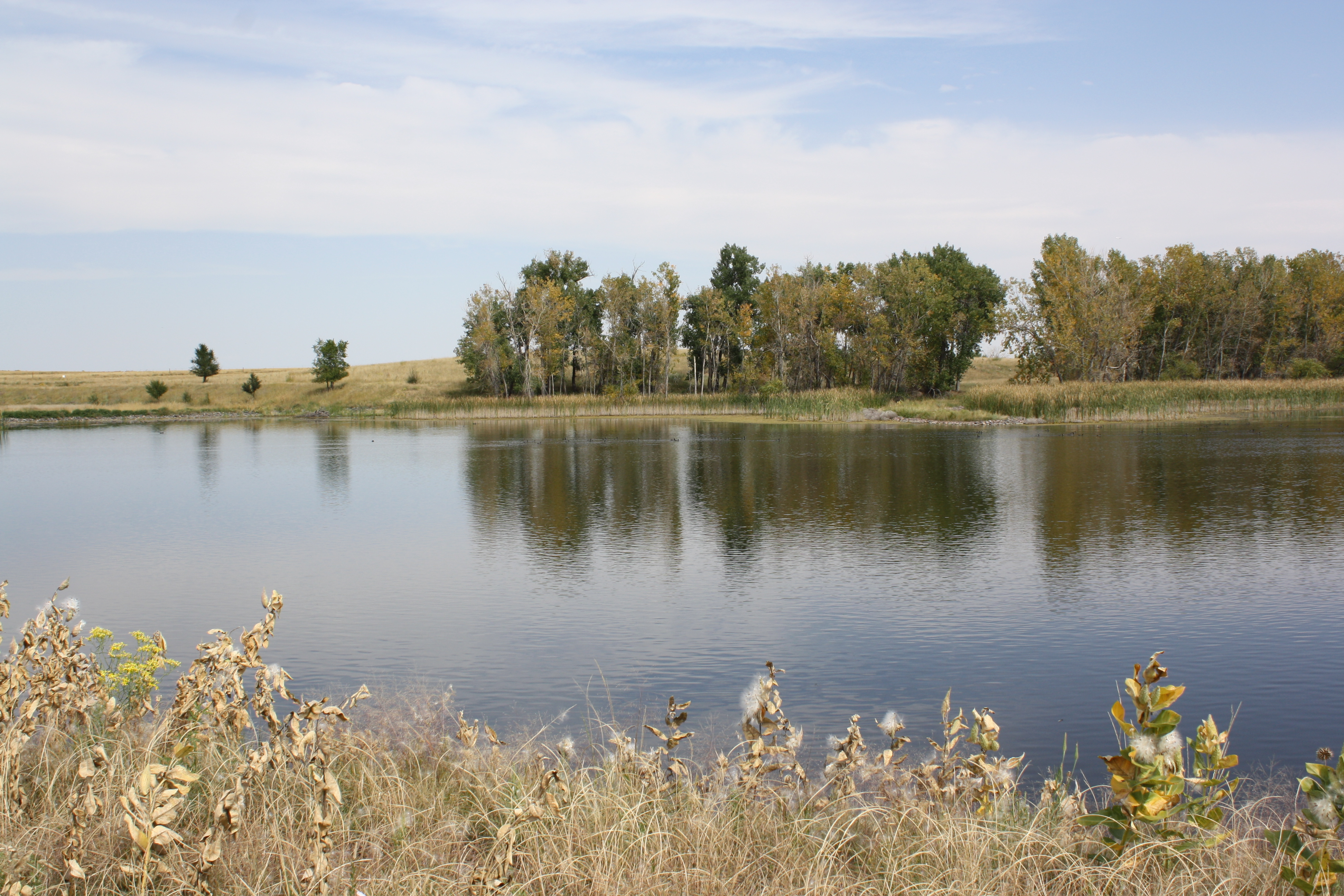
- Lower Derby Lake

- Location of the Derby CDP in Adams County, Colorado
- Coordinates: 39°50′25″N 104°55′01″W
- Country: United States
- State: Colorado
- County: Adams

Government
  - Type: unincorporated community
  - Body: Adams County

Area
  - Total: 1.6 sq mi (4.2 km^{2})
  - Land: 1.6 sq mi (4.2 km^{2})
  - Water: 0 sq mi (0 km^{2})
- Elevation: 5,125 ft (1,562 m)

Population (2020)
  - Total: 8,407
  - Density: 5,200/sq mi (2,000/km^{2})
- Time zone: UTC−07:00 (MST)
  - Summer (DST): UTC−06:00 (MDT)
- ZIP code: Commerce City 80022
- Area codes: 303/720/983
- GNIS CDP ID: 2408661
- FIPS code: 08-20275

Derby is an unincorporated community and a census-designated place (CDP) located in and governed by Adams County, Colorado, United States. The CDP is a part of the Denver-Aurora-Centennial, CO Metropolitan Statistical Area. The population of the Derby CDP was 8,407 at the United States Census 2020.

== History ==
The Derby, Colorado, post office operated from January 27, 1910, until January 31, 1963. The Commerce City, Colorado, post office (ZIP code 80022) now serves the area.

The community is named after Derby, England.

== Geography ==
The Derby CDP has an area of 1,129 acres (4.570 km^{2}), including 9.4 acres (0.038 km^{2}) of water.

== Demographics ==
The United States Census Bureau initially defined the Derby CDP for the 1950 United States census.

Derby CDP, Colorado
Year	Pop.	±%
1950	2,840	—
1960	10,124	+256.5%
1970	10,206	+0.8%
1980	8,578	−16.0%
1990	6,043	−29.6%
2000	6,423	+6.3%
2010	7,685	+19.6%
2020	8,407	+9.4%
Source: United States Census Bureau

=== 2020 census ===
As of the 2020 census, Derby had a population of 8,407. The median age was 31.4 years. 29.5% of residents were under the age of 18 and 10.2% of residents were 65 years of age or older. For every 100 females there were 105.8 males, and for every 100 females age 18 and over there were 105.8 males age 18 and over.

100.0% of residents lived in urban areas, while 0.0% lived in rural areas.

There were 2,377 households in Derby, of which 46.5% had children under the age of 18 living in them. Of all households, 45.1% were married-couple households, 24.0% were households with a male householder and no spouse or partner present, and 23.6% were households with a female householder and no spouse or partner present. About 15.8% of all households were made up of individuals and 6.5% had someone living alone who was 65 years of age or older.

There were 2,464 housing units, of which 3.5% were vacant. The homeowner vacancy rate was 0.9% and the rental vacancy rate was 3.7%.

Racial composition as of the 2020 census
Race	Number	Percent
White	3,398	40.4%
Black or African American	97	1.2%
American Indian and Alaska Native	252	3.0%
Asian	50	0.6%
Native Hawaiian and Other Pacific Islander	0	0.0%
Some other race	2,893	34.4%
Two or more races	1,717	20.4%
Hispanic or Latino (of any race)	6,056	72.0%

== Education ==
Derby is in Adams County School District 14. The district's comprehensive high school is Adams City High School.

== See also ==
- Front Range Urban Corridor
