= ADSF =

ADSF may refer to:

- Asian DanceSport Federation
- Denver's Art District on Santa Fe, an arts and cultural district in Denver, Colorado, U.S.
- Resistin, also known as adipose tissue-specific secretory factor
- Automated Directional Solidification Furnace, a secondary payload of space shuttle mission STS-26
