= Eastlake, Colorado =

Unincorporated community in Adams County, Colorado, United States

- unincorporated community
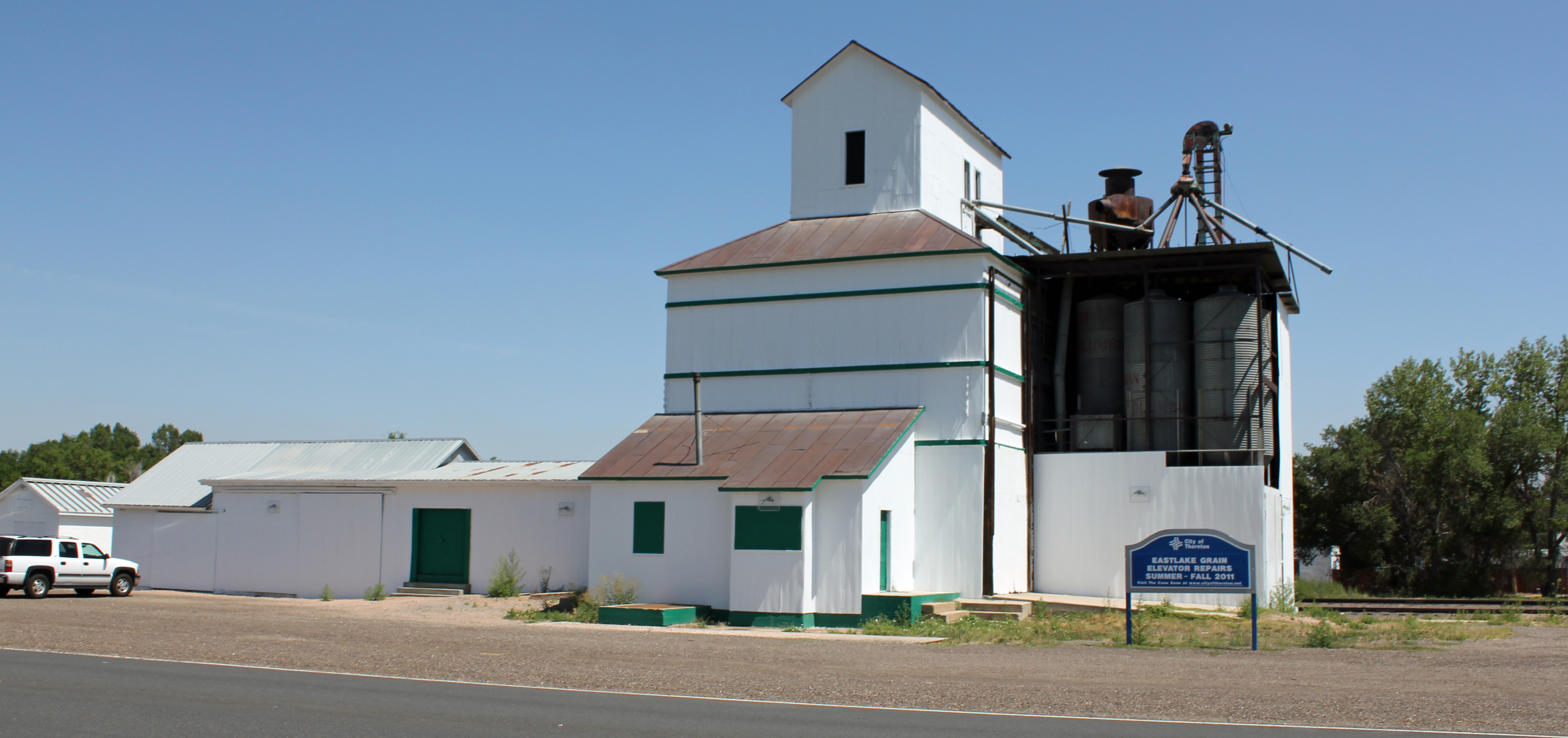
- The Eastlake Farmers Co-Operative Elevator Company, located at 126th Avenue and Claude Court in the Eastlake Neighborhood of Thornton.

- Location of Eastlake, Colorado Eastlake (Colorado)
- Coordinates: 39°55′26″N 104°57′41″W
- Country: United States
- State: Colorado
- County: Adams

Government
  - Type: unincorporated community
  - Body: Adams County
- Elevation: 5,269 ft (1,606 m)
- Time zone: UTC−07:00 (MST)
  - Summer (DST): UTC−06:00 (MDT)
- ZIP code: 80241
- Area codes: 303/720/983
- GNIS place ID: 184592

Eastlake is an unincorporated community and a U.S. Post Office in Adams County, Colorado, United States. The Eastlake Post Office has the ZIP Code 80214. Eastlake is a part of the Denver-Aurora-Centennial, CO Metropolitan Statistical Area and the Front Range Urban Corridor.

== History ==
The Eastlake, Colorado, post office opened on June 8, 1912. The community takes its name from nearby East Lake. Most of the Eastlake area has been annexed by the City of Thornton.

The RTD N Line (North Metro Rail Line) ends at Eastlake.

== Geography ==
Eastlake is located in western Adams County.

== See also ==
- Front Range Urban Corridor
