= Lucille Colacito =

Baseball player (1921-1998)

- Catcher
- Born: December 27, 1921; Florence, Colorado, U.S.
- Died: January 30, 1998 (aged 76); Adams City, Colorado, U.S.
- Batted: Right Threw: Right

Teams
- Kenosha Comets (1944–1945)

Career highlights and awards
- Women in Baseball – AAGPBL Permanent Display at Baseball Hall of Fame and Museum (1988)

Lucille "Lou" Colacito (later Appugliese; December 27, 1921 – January 30, 1998) was a catcher who played from 1944 through 1945 in the All-American Girls Professional Baseball League (AAGPBL). Listed at 5 ft 3 in (1.60 m), 120 lb, she batted and threw right-handed.

Born in Florence, Colorado, Colacito had limited experience before joining the league because her high school did not have sports teams. Then she began playing amateur softball in the local area. After graduating from school in 1943, she received an invitation to attend the next AAGPBL spring training in Peru, Illinois. She played two years with the Kenosha Comets.

Her most productive season came in 1944, when she posted career-numbers in games played (85), average (.179), runs (24) and RBI (22), while tying for eighth in the league for the most doubles (7).

After leaving the league, Colacito returned home and played softball for some years. She later continued her activities as a golfer and won several local awards over the years. She and her husband raised a son and enjoyed spending time with their two grandchildren. She is part of Women in Baseball, a permanent display based at the Baseball Hall of Fame and Museum in Cooperstown, New York, which was unveiled in 1988 to honor the entire All-American Girls Professional Baseball League. She was elected to the Denver Softball Hall of Fame.

Lucille Colacito died in 1998 in Adams City, Colorado, aged 76.

== Career statistics ==
Batting

GP	AB	R	H	2B	3B	HR	RBI	SB	TB	BB	SO	BA	OBP	SLG
153	445	37	73	9	0	2	28	42	88	BB 38	50	.164	.230	.198

Fielding

GP	PO	A	E	TC	DP	FA
149	560	65	22	647	9	.966
