= Tony Garcia (playwright) =

American dramatist

Anthony J. Garcia (born 1953), known as Tony Garcia, is a playwright and the current Executive Artistic Director of Su Teatro in Denver, Colorado. He has written over 20 original plays and has served as Su Teatro's artistic director since 1989.

== Biography ==
=== Early life ===
Garcia grew up in Denver, Colorado and has mentioned that his family lost their home as a result of the construction on Denver's Auraria Campus in the late 1960s.

=== Education ===
Garcia began attending the University of Colorado at Boulder in the fall of 1973 and dropped out in the spring of 1974. He later graduated from the University of Colorado at Denver with a Bachelor of Arts in Theater.

Garcia has since completed several fellowships, including the Rockefeller Fellowship in Theater arts in 2006, the United States Artists Fellowship in 2006, and the Livingston Fellowship from the Bonfils Stanton Foundation in 2011.

=== Career ===
Garcia started out as a musician for Su Teatro while still a student in 1972. He later took on roles as an actor until 1989, when he became Su Teatro's Executive Artistic Director. Since writing his first play in 1986, Garcia has written plays consistently, finishing one every three to four years.

Garcia spearheaded Su Teatro's fundraising campaign to raise $4.5 million for the theater's move to its new facility in the Denver's Santa Fe Arts District in 2010.

Garcia has also served as a faculty member for the National Association of Latino Art and CultureLeadership Institute. He currently still does work as a peer trainer for the Colorado Creative Industries’ Peer Assistance Network, is a member of the Western States Arts Federation’s Board of Trustees, and is an adjunct professor at Metro State College in Denver.

== Awards ==
- Denver Post Theater Person of the Year (2010)
- Artist residency at the Island Institute in Sitka, Alaska (2009)
- University of California Irvine Chicano Literary Award (1989)

== Plays ==
In chronological order of first publication.

- La Familia Sin Fabiano (1974)
- El Corrido Del Barrio (1976)
- Joaquin's Christmas (1976)
- Mrs. Quintana's Living Room (1978)
- Ludlow: El Grito De Las Minas (1980)
- Intro to Chicano History:101 (1982)
- Serafin Cantos y Lagrimas (1984)
- The Day Ricardo Falcon Died (1986)
- The Miracle at Tepeyac (1989)
- Lydia Mendoza: La Gloria De Tejas (1991)
- Obsidian Rain (1992)
- Little Hands Hold the Wind (1993)
- La Carpa Aztlan Presents I Don't Speak English Only (1994)
- The Return of the Barrio Moon (1996)
- Yerma (adaptation, 1998)
- Papi, Me and Cesar Chavez (2000)
- The Westside Oratorio (2004)
- El Sol Que Tu Eres (2005)
- When Pigs Fly and Men Have Babies (2006)
- To Colorado on a Christmas Night (2008)
- The Last Lamented Dance of the Rainbow Ballroom (2010)
- Enrique's Journey (2010)
- Chicanos Sing the Blues (2011)
- Amorcito Corazon (2013)
- Mestizo (adapted from the album by Daniel Valdez, 2013)
- El Rio: Las Lagrimas de la Llorona (2013)
- Cuarenta y Ocho (2014)
- La Tierra: El Corazon de mi Madre (2015)
