= Ricardo Falcón =

Chicano activist from Colorado

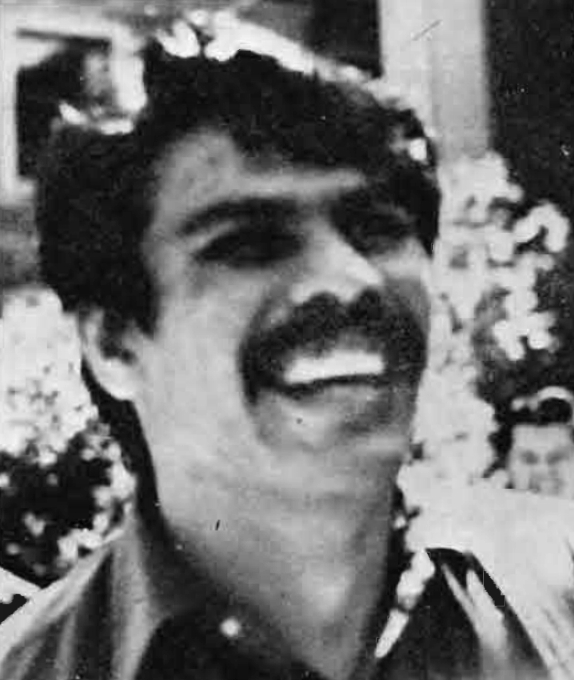
Falcón c. 1972

Ricardo Falcón (1945–1972) was a Chicano activist with the United Mexican American Students and was the first martyr of the Chicano movement in Colorado.

== Biography ==
Falcón was born on June 2, 1945 in Fort Lupton, Colorado. He was the second of nine children, and his family were laborers in the sugar beet fields. He graduated from high school in May 1963, and attended Lamar Junior College (now Lamar Community College) where he graduated in 1965.

Falcón earned a Bachelor of Arts in Sociology from the University of Colorado Boulder. He worked at the university as the United Mexican American Students (UMAS) Educational Opportunity Program assistant director until May 1972, when he was suspended for threatening a student and "poor conduct." The university's Human Rights Commission investigated and found that Falcon was unjustifiably suspended. University administrators pressured the UMAS director Pat Vigil to fire Falcon, and when Vigil refused, the university fired them both and obtained a court order that prevented both men from being on campus.

In 1970, Falcón ran for Weld County Sheriff.

At the time of his death, Falcón was a law student at the University of Denver Law School.

=== Personal life and activism ===
Falcón was a leader in the Colorado Chicano movement. He was one of eight students who founded United Mexican American Students at University of Colorado Boulder, and worked for the university in an administrative role with UMAS. He joined the lettuce strike with the United Farm Workers in the San Luis Valley. He was also part of the Crusade for Justice and the Mexican American Correctional Helping Organization (MACHO).

He worked with Chicano youth in many ways, including classes on the history of Mexican people, founded the middle and high school student organizations Zapatistas, and worked to improve conditions at the Fort Lupton migrant camp.

Falcón married Priscilla Falcón, and the two had a son together.

=== Murder ===
On August 30, 1972, Falcón and friends drove towards the first national La Raza Unida Convention held in El Paso, Texas. The group left from Fort Lupton, Colorado. He and his companions stopped at a service station in Orogrande, New Mexico, to service their overheated radiator. The driver of the car, Florencio Granado, asked the gas station owner Perry Brunson to water the car, who refused. Falcón intervened in the argument between Granado and Brunson. Brunson went into the station office and Falcón followed. Falcón was shot and died from wounds inflicted by a 38 police special pistol.

Falcón's companions went to other local businesses to try and call the police, but were refused service. An ambulance did not arrive for over an hour, but Brunson immediately called the police and they arrived in minutes.

One of Falcón's companions was Francisco "Kiko" Martinez, who investigated the incident from a legal standpoint. Martinez and Kenneth Padilla became the spokesmen for Falcón's widow, Priscilla. In December 1972, they brought a criminal manslaughter case against Brunson in Alamogordo, New Mexico. Brunson was a member of the segregationist American Independent Party, and Martinez argued the killing was racially motivated. Brunson was acquitted in two days by a white jury.

More than 1,200 people attended his funeral in Fort Lupton, and Brown Berets carried his casket.

=== Legacy ===
La Academia Ricardo Falcón was a private, non-profit school that was named in his honor. The school opened in 1973 and was located in Fort Lupton, CO.

Each year, the community comes together to honor Falcón by marching from his birthplace to the cemetery where he was buried. In 2022, the community celebrated his life and commemorated the 50th anniversary of his death.

In 1986, Tony Garcia wrote a play called The Day Ricardo Falcón Died.

Lamar Community College honored Falcon as the 2022 Alumnus of the Year.
