= Dupont, Colorado =

Unincorporated community in Adams County, Colorado, United States

- Unincorporated community
- Location of Dupont, Colorado. Dupont (Colorado)
- Coordinates: 39°50′17″N 104°54′43″W
- Country: United States
- State: Colorado
- County: Adams

Government
  - Type: unincorporated community
  - Body: Adams County
- Elevation: 5,145 ft (1,568 m)
- Time zone: UTC−07:00 (MST)
  - Summer (DST): UTC−06:00 (MDT)
- ZIP code: 80024
- Area codes: 303/720/983
- GNIS place ID: 184700

Dupont is an unincorporated community and U.S. Post Office located in and governed by Adams County, Colorado, United States. The Dupont Post Office has the ZIP Code 80024.

== History ==
The Dupont, Colorado, post office opened on June 19, 1926. The community takes its name from the DuPont Company, which owned property near the original town site.

== Geography ==
Dupont is located in Adams County at an of elevation 5,145 feet (1,568 m).

== See also ==
- Front Range Urban Corridor
