= Guadalupe Briseño =

Chicana civil rights activist (1933–2024)

Guadalupe "Lupe" Villalobos Briseño
- Born: 1933; San Antonio, Texas
- Died: 2024 (aged 90–91)
- Occupations: Farm worker and civil rights activist
- Spouse: Jose Hernandez Briseño

Guadalupe "Lupe" Villalobos Briseño (1933–2024) was a civil rights activist who led the Kitayama Carnation Strike in 1968-1969. In 2020, Briseño was recognized for her work and was inducted into the Colorado Women's Hall of Fame.

== Biography ==
Guadalupe Villalobos was born in 1933 and grew up in a family of migrant workers who traveled around Texas often. Her father was a crew leader to recruit workers for the Libby company.

Lupe and Jose Briseño Sr. married in 1951 and had five children including Jose Briseño Jr.

The family moved to Weld County, Colorado around 1957, and worked on farms in Windsor, Eaton, and Fort Lupton. Her children graduated from Brighton High School, and one of her sons enlisted in the Air Force.

== Kitayama Carnation Strike ==
Briseno began working at that Kitayama Corporation floral plant in Brighton, Colorado when her children were old enough to attend school. She witnessed miserable conditions for the mostly Mexican-American women, including long hours with no overtime pay, unsanitary eating areas, and an unsafe workplace that led to accidents and health problems. The nurseries had uncovered floors where the high humidity turned dirt to mud, and many workers slipped and fell or caught colds, flu, or pneumonia.

She and Rachel Sandoval, Martha del Rael, Mary Padilla, and Mary Silas created the National Floral Workers Organization (NFWO) and developed a four-step plan of action:

- Gain employee and community support;
- Plan for a general strike;
- Gain political and legal support from the community;
- Establish specific demands for their strike.

Their demands included higher pay for certain jobs, health care, and seniority benefits. Their organizing principle was that women and workers deserve fundamental human rights and to be treated with respect and dignity.

Management began their intimidation tactics when they found out the workers were organizing. During the first informal meeting shared by whisper network, the managers and owner Ray Kitayama attended the meeting to dissuade the workers. Management called police officers into the plant on the day after the NFWO's first meeting. Kitayama led a meeting after work hours and yelled at the workers with berating language, saying "they were lucky to have a job."

In May 1968, Kitayama and his assistant went to Briseño's home to fire her, but she vowed to continue to fight. Briseño reached out to César Chávez who helped advise their efforts and recognized the organization as an affiliate of the United Farm Workers Organizing Committee. Other local organizations like Corky Gonzales's Crusade for Justice and the Chicano students at the University of Colorado Boulder also gave their support.

By June 1968, the NFWO had nearly 70 members who had signed the union card. On June 28, members unanimously voted to strike.

The strike began on July 1, 1968. During the strike, families of striking workers faced harassment in the community and at school. Other farmers in the area changed their practices in order to avoid trouble from the workers. The participants slowly dwindled as the winter weather and financial troubles grew worse. Strikers and their families were being "blackballed" and could not find other jobs in the area.

On February 15, 1969, after eight months of deteriorating conditions on the picket line, Briseño, Padilla, Sandoval, del Real, and Sailes chained themselves to the gate of the Kitayama plant. On the orders of Kitayama, Weld County police officers cut the chains and sprayed tear gas on the women.

Briseño and forty five other women were on strike for 221 days before they decided to end it. As a result, working conditions improved at the plant, but they did not successfully start a union.

The Kitayama Carnation Strike was one of the first workers' strikes in which the organizers and workers were Chicana and Mexicanas. It became an inspiration for other organizations in Denver like Chicano Crusade for Justice, United Mexican American Students, and Students for a Democratic Society.

== Recognition ==
In 2020, Briseño was inducted into the Colorado Women's Hall of Fame.

Playwright Anthony J. Garcia wrote and directed a play for Su Teatro based on the Kitayama Carnation Strike, War of the Flowers.

== See also ==
- Chicano Movement
- Los Seis de Boulder
- Protests of 1968
- Rodolfo Gonzales
