= 27J Schools =

School district in Brighton, Colorado, USA

Address
- 88 North 40th Avenue Brighton, Colorado, 80601; United States
- Coordinates: 39°59′14″N 104°46′14″W

District information
- Type: Unified school district
- Grades: P–12
- Established: 1959; 66 years ago
- Superintendent: Will Pierce
- Schools: 33
- Budget: $276,005,000
- NCES District ID: 0802580

Students and staff
- Students: 23,139
- Teachers: 1,222.19 (on an FTE basis)
- Staff: 2,290.03 (on an FTE basis)
- Student–teacher ratio: 18.93

Other information
- Website: sd27j.org

27J Schools is a school district headquartered in Brighton, Colorado. The district was established in 1959 when several existing school districts were consolidated. Will Pierce is currently the superintendent.

The district includes sections of Adams County, Weld County, and Broomfield. In addition to Brighton it serves Aurora, Commerce City, Henderson, and Thornton.

In August 2018 the district switched a four-day school week. In that period the district had around 18,000 students.

== Schools ==
Elementary:

- Brantner Elementary
- Henderson Elementary
- North Elementary
- Northeast Elementary
- Mary E. Pennock Elementary
- Reunion Elementary
- Second Creek Elementary
- South Elementary
- Southeast Elementary
- Southlawn Elementary
- Thimmig Elementary
- Turnberry Elementary
- West Ridge Elementary

Middle:

- Overland Trail Middle School
- Prairie View Middle School
- Quist Middle School
- Otho E. Stuart Middle School
- Vikan Middle School
- Discovery Magnet K-8

High:

- Brighton High School
- Prairie View High School
- Riverdale Ridge High School

Alternative:

- Innovations and Options
- 27J Online Academy

Charter:

- Bromley East Charter school
- Belle Creek Charter School
- Eagle Ridge Academy High School
- Landmark Academy
- Foundations Academy
