= Su Teatro =

Chicano theatre company in Denver, Colorado

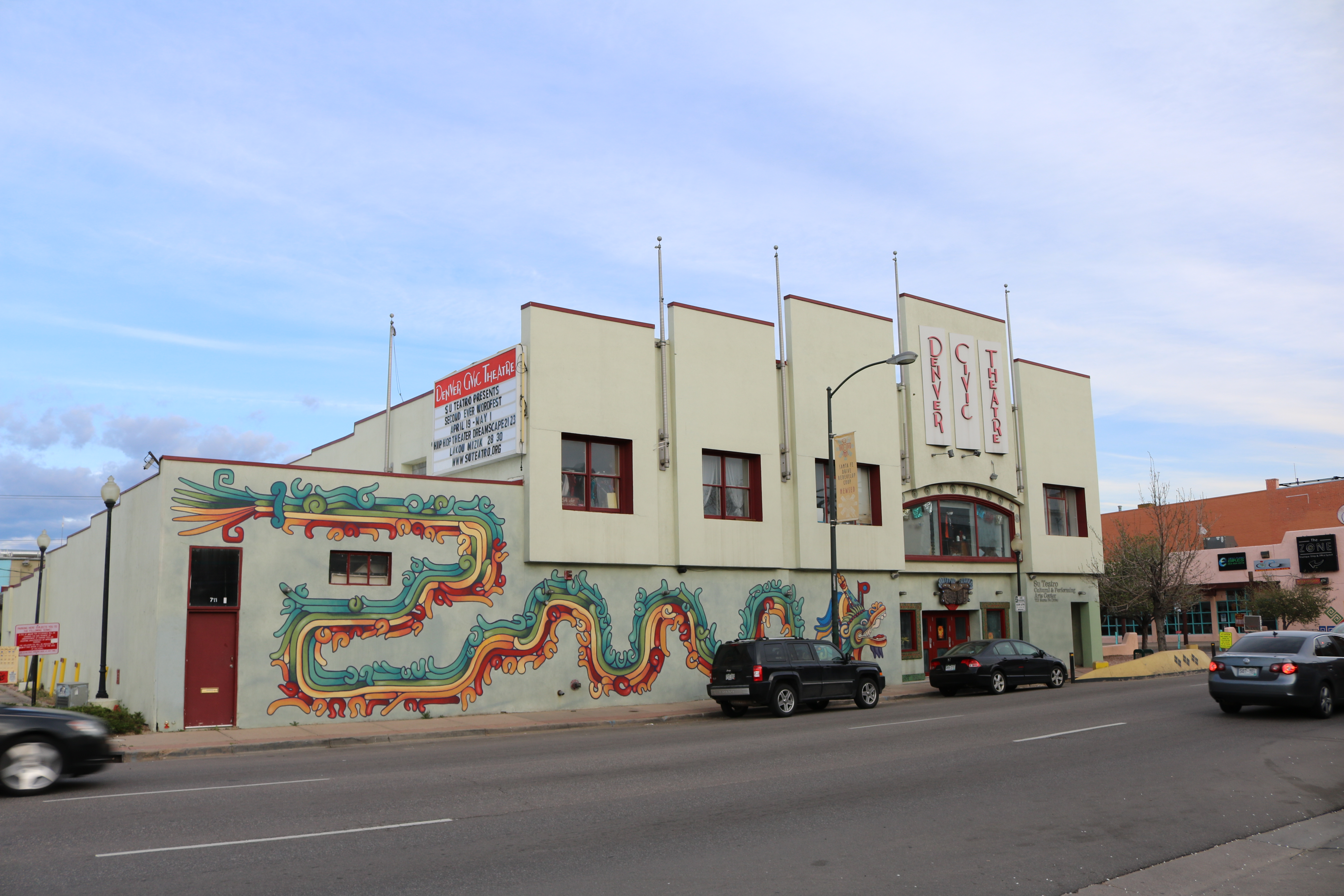
- Denver Civic Theatre, home of Su Teatro Cultural & Performing Arts Center
- Interactive map of Su Teatro
- Address: 721 Santa Fe Dr, Denver, CO 80204
- Capacity: 320
- Type: Performance Arts Venue
- Event: Chicano theatre

Construction
- Opened: 1972

Website
- http://suteatro.org/

Su Teatro is an American professional theatre. It is the third-oldest Chicano theater company in the United States and the oldest theater company of any kind in Denver, Colorado. Productions explore the Chicano experience in America with an emphasis on preserving cultural heritage and advocating for social justice.

Created in 1972 as a student theater group at the University of Colorado at Denver, it is now housed in the Denver Civic Theatre in the Santa Fe Arts District. The Su Teatro Cultural and Performing Arts Center features a 320-seat main theatre, an art gallery, and a small studio theatre.

== History ==
Su Teatro was formed in a University of Colorado at Denver reading class in 1972 by faculty member Rowena Rivera. In protest against the university's policy of placing Chicano students in remedial reading courses, Rivera focused her teaching on drama, asking students to read plays while also creating and directing original work.

An early production, El Corrido del Barrio, explored and protested the 1973 destruction of the primarily Hispanic Auraria neighborhood in order to build campuses for the University of Colorado at Denver, Metropolitan State University, and Community College of Denver. El Corrido del Barrio has remained in the company's repertory and was performed as part of its fiftieth anniversary celebration.

In 1989, the company established a permanent home at the then-abandoned Elyria School in Northeast Denver. Supported by a bridge loan of $790,000 from the City of Denver, Su Teatro moved to the Denver Civic Theatre in February 2010.

As of 2016, the company had produced over forty original works devoted to exploring the Chicano experience onstage. The company celebrated its fiftieth anniversary in May 2023 under the leadership of artistic director Tony Garcia.
