= Ronnie Bradford =

American football player and coach (born 1970)

Personal information
- Born: October 1, 1970 (age 56); Minot, North Dakota, U.S.
- Listed height: 5 ft 10 in (1.78 m)
- Listed weight: 188 lb (85 kg)

Career information
- Position: Defensive back (No. 23, 26)
- High school: Adams City (Commerce City, Colorado)
- College: Colorado
- NFL draft: 1993: 4th round, 105th overall pick

Career history

Playing
- Miami Dolphins (1993)*; Denver Broncos (1993–1995); Arizona Cardinals (1996); Atlanta Falcons (1997–2001); Minnesota Vikings (2002)
- * Offseason or practice squad member only

Coaching
- Denver Broncos (2003) Assistant special teams coach; Denver Broncos (2004–2006) Special teams coordinator; Denver Broncos (2007) Assistant defensive backs coach; Denver Broncos (2008) Defensive backs coach; Kansas City Chiefs (2009) Defensive assistant; California (2010–2012) Defensive assistant; Louisiana Tech (2013–2015) Special teams coordinator & defensive backs coach; USC (2016–2018) Defensive backs coach; Montana (2021–2022) Assistant head coach & cornerbacks coach; Montana (2023) Defensive coordinator & safeties coach; Miami Dolphins (2024–2025) Senior special teams assistant

Awards and highlights
- National champion (1990)

Career NFL statistics
- Tackles: 422
- Sacks: 2
- Interceptions: 13
- Touchdowns: 1
- Stats at Pro Football Reference

Ronald Lee Bradford (born October 1, 1970) is an American former professional football player who was a defensive back in the National Football League (NFL) for the Denver Broncos (1993–1995), Arizona Cardinals (1996), Atlanta Falcons (1997–2001), and Minnesota Vikings. He played college football for the Colorado Buffaloes. He also served as a defensive assistant coach for the Broncos and Kansas City Chiefs. Bradford was also the defensive backs coach at USC.

== Early life ==
Bradford was born in Minot North Dakota. Bradford played high school football at Adams City High School in Commerce City, Colorado.

== College career ==
Ronnie Bradford played college football at the University of Colorado Boulder. During his sophomore year, he blocked an extra point in the Buffaloes' 10–9 victory over Notre Dame in the 1991 Orange Bowl to help Colorado win a share of the National Championship in the 1990 college football season (Colorado shared the National Championship in 1990 with Georgia Tech). That blocked extra point by Bradford was the difference in that football game.

== Professional career ==
Bradford was selected in the fourth round of the 1993 NFL Draft by the Miami Dolphins. Bradford finished his ten NFL seasons with two sacks, four fumble recoveries, and 13 interceptions, one of which he returned for a touchdown. With the Falcons, he played in Super Bowl XXXIII and recorded an interception from Broncos quarterback John Elway in the game.

== Coaching career ==
Bradford spent six seasons (2003–2008) with the Denver Broncos coaching on defense and special teams. He was a defensive assistant with the Kansas City Chiefs in 2009. Bradford joined California's coaching staff in March 2010 as an administrative assistant for the defense. The move reunited Bradford with former Kansas City defensive coordinator. In September 2011, he was added to the U of Memphis football staff as a secondary coach. In 2013, he coached at Louisiana Tech University. In 2016, he was hired by USC to coach the defensive secondary.
