= Cabin Creek, Colorado =

Unincorporated community in Adams and Arapahoe Counties, CO, USA

- unincorporated community
- Location of Cabin Creek, Colorado. Cabin Creek (Colorado)
- Coordinates: 39°44′26″N 104°01′50″W
- Country: United States
- State: Colorado
- Counties: Adams and Arapahoe

Government
  - Type: unincorporated community
  - Body: Adams County; Arapahoe County
- Elevation: 5,063 ft (1,543 m)
- Time zone: UTC−07:00 (MST)
  - Summer (DST): UTC−06:00 (MDT)
- ZIP code: Deer Trail 80105
- Area codes: 303/720/983
- GNIS pop ID: 185005

Cabin Creek is an unincorporated community in Adams and Arapahoe counties in the U.S. state of Colorado. It is located within the Denver metropolitan area. Cabin Creek is served by the Deer Trail, Colorado, post office (ZIP code 80105).

Deer Trail 26J School District serves Cabin Creek.

== History ==
Cabin Creek has never had its own post office.

== See also ==
- Denver–Aurora–Lakewood, CO Metropolitan Statistical Area
- Front Range Urban Corridor
