= Adams County, Colorado =

County in Colorado, United States

- County
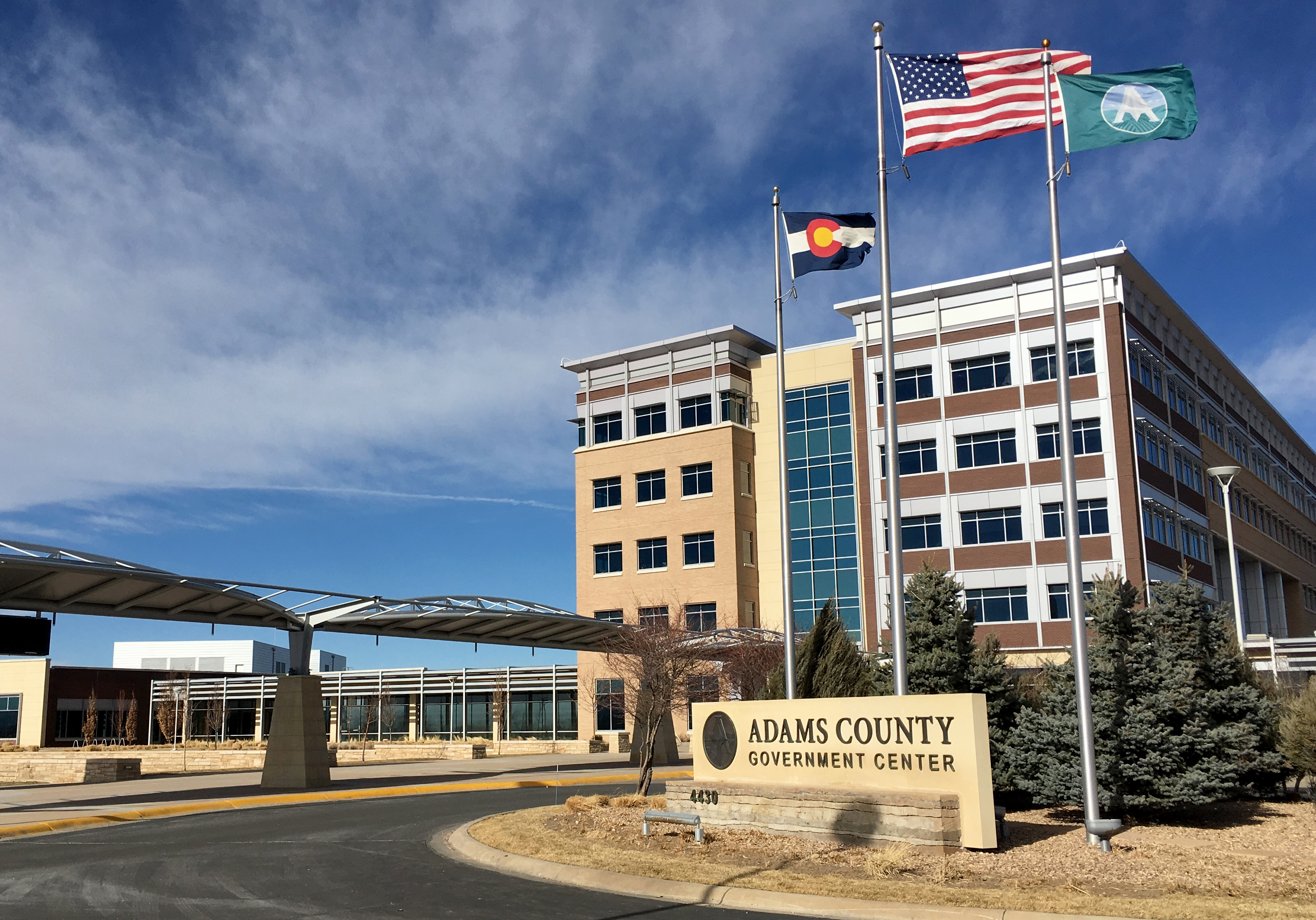
- Adams County Government Center in Brighton

- Flag

- Location within the U.S. state of Colorado
- Coordinates: 39.87°N 104.35°W
- Country: United States
- State: Colorado
- Founded: April 15, 1901
- Named for: Alva Adams
- Seat: Brighton
- Largest city: Thornton

Area
  - Total: 1,184 sq mi (3,070 km^{2})
  - Land: 1,168 sq mi (3,030 km^{2})
  - Water: 16 sq mi (41 km^{2}) 1.4%

Population (2020)
  - Total: 519,572
  - Estimate (2025): 554,668 ▲
  - Density: 444.8/sq mi (171.8/km^{2})
- Time zone: UTC−7 (Mountain)
  - Summer (DST): UTC−6 (MDT)
- Congressional districts: 4th, 6th, 7th, 8th
- Website: www.adcogov.org

Adams County is a county located in the U.S. state of Colorado. As of the 2020 United States census, the population was 519,572. The county seat is Brighton, and the largest city is Thornton. The county is named for Alva Adams, an early Governor of the State of Colorado in 1887–1889. Adams County is part of the Denver metropolitan area.

== History ==
On May 30, 1854, the Kansas–Nebraska Act created the Territory of Nebraska and Territory of Kansas, divided by the Parallel 40° North (168th Avenue in present-day Adams County). The future Adams County, Colorado, occupied a strip of northern Arapahoe County, Kansas Territory, immediately south of the Nebraska Territory.

In 1859, John D. "Colonel Jack" Henderson built a ranch, trading post, and hotel on Henderson Island in the South Platte River in Arapahoe County, Kansas Territory. Jack Henderson was the former editor and proprietor of the Leavenworth (Kansas Territory) Journal and an outspoken pro-slavery politician who had been accused of vote fraud in eastern Kansas. Henderson sold meat and provisions to gold seekers on their way up the South Platte River Trail to the gold fields during the Pike's Peak Gold Rush. Henderson Island was the first permanent settlement in the South Platte River Valley between Fort Saint Vrain in the Nebraska Territory and the Cherry Creek Diggings in the Kansas Territory. Jack Henderson eventually returned to eastern Kansas and fought for the Union in the American Civil War. Henderson Island is today the site of the Riverdale Regional Park, formerly known as the Adams County Regional Park and Fairgrounds.

The eastern portion of the Kansas Territory was admitted to the Union as the State of Kansas on January 29, 1861, and on February 28, 1861, the remaining western portion of the territory was made part of the new Colorado Territory. The Colorado Territory created Arapahoe County, on November 1, 1861, and Colorado was admitted to the Union on August 1, 1876.

In 1901, the Colorado General Assembly voted to split Arapahoe County into three parts: a new Adams County, a new consolidated City and County of Denver, and the remainder of the Arapahoe County to be renamed South Arapahoe County. A ruling by the Colorado Supreme Court, subsequent legislation, and a referendum delayed the creation of Adams County until November 15, 1902. Governor James Bradley Orman designated Brighton as the temporary Adams County Seat. Adams County originally stretched 160 miles (260 kilometers) from present-day Sheridan Boulevard to the Kansas state border. On May 12, 1903, the eastern 88 miles (142 kilometers)-wide section of Adams County was transferred to the new Washington County and the new Yuma County, reducing the length of Adams County to the present 72 miles (116 kilometers) and its area to the present 1,184 square miles (3,070 km^{2}). On November 8, 1904, Adams County voters chose Brighton as the permanent county seat.

A 1989 vote transferred 53 square miles (140 square kilometers) of Adams County to the City and County of Denver for the proposed Denver International Airport, leaving the densely populated western portion of the county as two oddly-shaped peninsulas. Adams County lost the tip of its northwest corner when the consolidated City and County of Broomfield was created on November 15, 2001.

== Geography ==
According to the U.S. Census Bureau, the county has a total area of 1,184 square miles (3,070 km^{2}), of which 1,168 square miles (3,030 km^{2}) is land and 16 square miles (41 km^{2}) (1.4%) is water.

Adams County surrounds (and surrendered the land for) most of Denver International Airport which are in the City and County of Denver.

=== Adjacent counties ===
- Weld County – north
- Morgan County – northeast
- Washington County – east
- Arapahoe County – south
- City & County of Denver – southwest
- Jefferson County – west
- City & County of Broomfield – northwest

=== Major highways ===
- Interstate 25
- Interstate 70
- Interstate 76
- Interstate 225
- Interstate 270
- I-70 BS
- U.S. Highway 6
- U.S. Highway 36
- U.S. Highway 40
- U.S. Highway 85
- U.S. Highway 287
- State Highway 2
- State Highway 7
- State Highway 36
- State Highway 40
- State Highway 44
- State Highway 79
- State Highway 128
- State Highway 224
- State Highway 265
- E-470 (tollway)
- State Highway 95
- U.S. Highway 87

=== National protected area ===
- Rocky Mountain Arsenal National Wildlife Refuge

=== State park ===
- Barr Lake State Park

=== Historic trail ===
- South Platte Trail

=== Recreational trails ===
- American Discovery Trail
- Big Dry Creek National Recreation Trail
- Highline Canal National Recreation Trail
- Platte River Greenway National Recreation Trail
- Rocky Mountain Arsenal National Recreation Trail

== Demographics ==
Historical population
Census	Pop.	Note	%±
1910	8,892		—
1920	14,430		62.3%
1930	20,245		40.3%
1940	22,481		11.0%
1950	40,234		79.0%
1960	120,296		199.0%
1970	185,789		54.4%
1980	245,944		32.4%
1990	265,038		7.8%
2000	363,857		37.3%
2010	441,603		21.4%
2020	519,572		17.7%
2025 (est.)	554,668	▲	6.8%
U.S. Decennial Census; 1790-1960 1900-1990; 1990-2000 2010-2020

=== 2020 census ===
As of the 2020 census, the county had a population of 519,572. Of the residents, 25.7% were under the age of 18 and 11.1% were 65 years of age or older; the median age was 34.4 years. For every 100 females there were 101.9 males, and for every 100 females age 18 and over there were 100.9 males. 96.0% of residents lived in urban areas and 4.0% lived in rural areas.

Adams County, Colorado – Racial and ethnic composition Note: the US Census treats Hispanic/Latino as an ethnic category. This table excludes Latinos from the racial categories and assigns them to a separate category. Hispanics/Latinos may be of any race.
Race / Ethnicity (NH = Non-Hispanic)	Pop 2000	Pop 2010	Pop 2020	% 2000	% 2010	% 2020
White alone (NH)	230,500	234,970	239,295	63.35%	53.21%	46.06%
Black or African American alone (NH)	10,206	12,207	16,054	2.80%	2.76%	3.09%
Native American or Alaska Native alone (NH)	2,352	2,478	2,869	0.65%	0.56%	0.55%
Asian alone (NH)	11,415	15,431	22,583	3.14%	3.49%	4.35%
Pacific Islander alone (NH)	331	476	753	0.09%	0.11%	0.14%
Other race alone (NH)	328	677	2,369	0.09%	0.15%	0.46%
Mixed race or Multiracial (NH)	6,140	7,486	19,000	1.69%	1.70%	3.66%
Hispanic or Latino (any race)	102,585	167,878	216,649	28.19%	38.02%	41.70%
Total	363,857	441,603	519,572	100.00%	100.00%	100.00%

The racial makeup of the county was 55.8% White, 3.4% Black or African American, 1.8% American Indian and Alaska Native, 4.5% Asian, 0.2% Native Hawaiian and Pacific Islander, 16.8% from some other race, and 17.6% from two or more races. Hispanic or Latino residents of any race comprised 41.7% of the population.

There were 178,525 households in the county, of which 38.1% had children under the age of 18 living with them and 23.6% had a female householder with no spouse or partner present. About 20.9% of all households were made up of individuals and 7.0% had someone living alone who was 65 years of age or older.

There were 186,544 housing units, of which 4.3% were vacant. Among occupied housing units, 66.5% were owner-occupied and 33.5% were renter-occupied. The homeowner vacancy rate was 1.0% and the rental vacancy rate was 6.9%.

=== 2000 census ===
As of the 2000 census, there were 363,857 people, 128,156 households, and 92,144 families residing in the county. The population density was 305 people per square mile (118 people/km^{2}). There were 132,594 housing units at an average density of 111 per square mile (43/km^{2}). The racial makeup of the county was 77.29% White, 2.97% Black or African American, 1.19% Native American, 3.21% Asian, 0.12% Pacific Islander, 11.73% from other races, and 3.49% from two or more races. 28.19% of the population were Hispanic or Latino of any race.

There were 128,156 households, out of which 37.80% had children under the age of 18 living with them, 53.80% were married couples living together, 12.10% had a female householder with no husband present, and 28.10% were non-families. 21.20% of all households were made up of individuals, and 5.50% had someone who was 65 years of age or older living alone. The average household size was 2.81 and the average family size was 3.27.

In the county, the population was spread out, with 28.60% under the age of 18, 10.30% from 18 to 24, 34.00% from 25 to 44, 19.40% from 45 to 64, and 7.80% who were 65 years of age or older. The median age was 31 years. For every 100 females, there were 102.80 males. For every 100 females age 18 and over, there were 102.10 males.

The median income for a household in the county was $47,323, and the median income for a family was $52,517. Males had a median income of $36,499 versus $28,053 for females. The per capita income for the county was $19,944. About 6.50% of families and 8.90% of the population were below the poverty line, including 10.90% of those under age 18 and 7.30% of those age 65 or over.

In 2000, the largest denominational groups were Catholics (with 60,429 members) and Evangelical Protestants (with 25,552 members). The largest religious bodies were the Catholic Church (with 60,429 adherents) and the Church of Jesus Christ of Latter-day Saints (with 6,808 adherents).

== Government ==
Adams County has a Board of Commissioners that operate as a collective governing board. There are five members that form the Board of Commissioners with each elected to represent a district or portion of the county. There are other elected officials that oversee an aspect or department of county operations.

Adams County Commissioners
District	Commissioner	Party
District 1	Julie Duran Mullica	Democratic
District 2	Kathy Henson	Democratic
District 3	Emma Pinter	Democratic
District 4	Steve O'Dorisio	Democratic
District 5	Lynn Baca	Democratic

Adams County Elected Officials
Title	Official	Party
Assessor	Ken Musso	Democratic
Clerk and Recorder	Josh Zygielbaum	Democratic
Coroner	Monica Broncucia-Jordan	Democratic
Sheriff	Gene Claps	Democratic
Surveyor	Bryan Douglass	N/A
Treasurer and Public Trustee	Alex Villagran	Democratic

Adams County lies within the 17th Judicial District which is represented by District Attorney Brian Mason.

== Politics ==
Adams County is predominately Democratic, not having voted Republican since Ronald Reagan in 1984. It has only gone Republican three times since 1960, all of which were 400-vote and 40-state Republican landslides.

In 2016, Hillary Clinton won the county without a majority, becoming the first Democrat to do so since her husband Bill Clinton in 1992. In the 2020 election, Joe Biden easily won the county with a majority of the vote, a percentage similar to Barack Obama in 2012 and 2008 but with a much larger vote count.

Despite its Democratic majority, Adams County is significantly less Democratic than most other counties in the Denver metro area, frequently swinging towards the national trend. Despite Biden's overwhelming victory in 2020, the county swung hard back towards Donald Trump in 2024, reducing the Democratic margin of victory from nearly 20% to under 10%. This came even as Colorado failed to swing as hard as most other states.

United States presidential election results for Adams County, Colorado
Year	Republican		Democratic		Third party(ies)	
Year	No.	%	No.	%	No.	%
1904	1,115	50.89%	1,041	47.51%	35	1.60%
1908	1,301	49.06%	1,232	46.46%	119	4.49%
1912	398	14.10%	1,312	46.48%	1,113	39.43%
1916	1,165	33.93%	2,120	61.74%	149	4.34%
1920	2,510	57.57%	1,633	37.45%	217	4.98%
1924	2,931	56.33%	1,209	23.24%	1,063	20.43%
1928	4,031	63.10%	2,265	35.46%	92	1.44%
1932	2,812	36.69%	4,554	59.41%	299	3.90%
1936	3,124	38.33%	4,865	59.69%	162	1.99%
1940	4,767	50.16%	4,674	49.18%	62	0.65%
1944	4,933	54.43%	4,101	45.25%	29	0.32%
1948	6,240	57.83%	4,419	40.95%	132	1.22%
1952	8,995	54.89%	7,321	44.68%	71	0.43%
1956	12,778	52.23%	11,470	46.89%	215	0.88%
1960	18,452	46.36%	21,168	53.19%	178	0.45%
1964	15,652	30.42%	35,498	68.99%	304	0.59%
1968	24,343	43.87%	25,111	45.25%	6,039	10.88%
1972	40,372	60.79%	24,170	36.39%	1,870	2.82%
1976	35,392	45.30%	40,551	51.90%	2,184	2.80%
1980	42,916	50.50%	31,357	36.90%	10,702	12.59%
1984	55,092	60.20%	35,285	38.56%	1,134	1.24%
1988	43,163	45.87%	49,464	52.57%	1,467	1.56%
1992	30,856	29.93%	45,357	44.00%	26,864	26.06%
1996	36,666	38.92%	48,314	51.28%	9,234	9.80%
2000	47,561	44.10%	54,132	50.19%	6,159	5.71%
2004	65,912	48.22%	69,122	50.57%	1,643	1.20%
2008	63,976	39.86%	93,445	58.22%	3,080	1.92%
2012	70,972	40.12%	100,649	56.90%	5,272	2.98%
2016	80,082	41.35%	96,558	49.86%	17,037	8.80%
2020	95,657	40.41%	134,202	56.69%	6,881	2.91%
2024	103,024	44.12%	124,056	53.13%	6,411	2.75%

United States Senate election results for Adams County, Colorado2
Year	Republican		Democratic		Third party(ies)	
Year	No.	%	No.	%	No.	%
2020	98,341	41.72%	130,409	55.33%	6,950	2.95%

United States Senate election results for Adams County, Colorado3
Year	Republican		Democratic		Third party(ies)	
Year	No.	%	No.	%	No.	%
2022	63,586	41.26%	90,483	58.71%	43	0.03%

Colorado Gubernatorial election results for Adams County
Year	Republican		Democratic		Third party(ies)	
Year	No.	%	No.	%	No.	%
2022	63,960	38.16%	99,625	59.43%	4,039	2.41%

== Education ==
The school districts serving Adams County are:

- Adams 12 Five Star Schools
- Adams-Arapahoe School District 28J
- Adams County School District 14
- Bennett School District 29-J
- Byers School District 32J
- Deer Trail School District 26J
- Mapleton School District 1
- School District 27J
- Strasburg School District 31J
- Westminster Public Schools
- Wiggins School District RE-50J

The county is also home to the Westminster campus of Front Range Community College, the largest community college by enrollment in Colorado.

== Communities ==
=== Cities ===
- Arvada (part)
- Aurora (part)
- Brighton
- Commerce City
- Federal Heights
- Northglenn
- Thornton (most)
- Westminster (part)

=== Town ===
- Bennett (part)
- Lochbuie (part)

=== Census-designated places ===
- Berkley
- Derby
- North Washington
- Shaw Heights
- Sherrelwood
- Strasburg (mostly in Arapahoe Co.)
- Todd Creek
- Twin Lakes
- Watkins (mostly in Arapahoe Co.)
- Welby

=== Other unincorporated communities ===
- Adams City
- Barr Lake
- Cabin Creek
- Comanche
- Dupont
- Eastlake
- Hazeltine
- Henderson
- Leader
- Living Springs
- Manila

== License plate code ==
Up until 1999 when Colorado ceased coding license plates by county, Adams County used the following codes on license plates issued to passenger vehicles: TE-UF, GA-GG, SAA-SEW, and SEY-TZZ.

== In popular culture ==
Adams County was featured as the fictional rival of South Park's peewee hockey team in the South Park episode "Stanley's Cup".

== See also ==
- Bibliography of Colorado
- Geography of Colorado
- History of Colorado
  - Arapahoe County, Kansas Territory
  - Arapahoe County, Jefferson Territory
  - Arapahoe County, Colorado Territory
  - Arapahoe County, Colorado
  - National Register of Historic Places listings in Adams County, Colorado
- Index of Colorado-related articles
- List of Colorado-related lists
  - List of counties in Colorado
  - List of statistical areas in Colorado
- Outline of Colorado
  - Front Range Urban Corridor
