= Shaw Heights, Colorado =

Census-designated place in Adams County, CO, USA

- Census-designated place
- Location of the Shaw Heights CDP in Adams County, Colorado
- Coordinates: 39°51′24″N 105°02′21″W
- Country: United States
- State: Colorado
- County: Adams County

Government
  - Type: unincorporated community

Area
  - Total: 0.701 sq mi (1.816 km^{2})
  - Land: 0.700 sq mi (1.814 km^{2})
  - Water: 0.00077 sq mi (0.002 km^{2})
- Elevation: 5,512 ft (1,680 m)

Population (2020)
  - Total: 5,185
  - Density: 7,403/sq mi (2,858/km^{2})
- Time zone: UTC-7 (MST)
  - Summer (DST): UTC-6 (MDT)
- ZIP Code: Westminster 80031
- Area codes: 303 & 720
- GNIS feature ID: 2583295

Shaw Heights is an unincorporated community and a census-designated place (CDP) located in and governed by Adams County, Colorado, United States. The CDP is part of the Denver–Aurora–Lakewood, CO Metropolitan Statistical Area. The population of the Shaw Heights CDP was 5,185 at the United States Census 2020. The Westminster post office (Zip code 80031) serves the area.

== Geography ==
The Shaw Heights CDP has an area of 449 acres (1.816 km^{2}), including 0.49 acres (0.002 km^{2}) of water.

== Demographics ==
=== 2020 census ===
As of the 2020 census, Shaw Heights had a population of 5,185. The median age was 36.7 years. 22.3% of residents were under the age of 18 and 15.4% of residents were 65 years of age or older. For every 100 females there were 104.6 males, and for every 100 females age 18 and over there were 105.7 males age 18 and over.

100.0% of residents lived in urban areas, while 0.0% lived in rural areas.

There were 1,715 households in Shaw Heights, of which 33.3% had children under the age of 18 living in them. Of all households, 49.7% were married-couple households, 19.5% were households with a male householder and no spouse or partner present, and 23.0% were households with a female householder and no spouse or partner present. About 18.4% of all households were made up of individuals and 7.4% had someone living alone who was 65 years of age or older.

There were 1,773 housing units, of which 3.3% were vacant. The homeowner vacancy rate was 1.0% and the rental vacancy rate was 5.9%.

Racial composition as of the 2020 census
Race	Number	Percent
White	2,932	56.5%
Black or African American	62	1.2%
American Indian and Alaska Native	78	1.5%
Asian	295	5.7%
Native Hawaiian and Other Pacific Islander	4	0.1%
Some other race	590	11.4%
Two or more races	1,224	23.6%
Hispanic or Latino (of any race)	2,048	39.5%

=== 2010 census ===
The United States Census Bureau initially defined the Shaw Heights CDP for the United States Census 2010.

Shaw Heights CDP, Colorado
Year	Pop.	±%
2010	5,116	—
2020	5,185	+1.3%
Source: United States Census Bureau

== Education ==
Shaw Heights is served by Westminster Public Schools.

- Shaw Heights Middle School

== See also ==
- North Central Colorado Urban Area
