= Brighton High School (Colorado) =

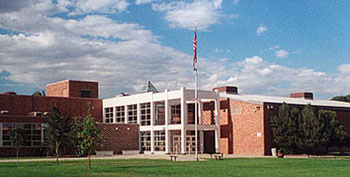
- Brighton High School prior to its most recent renovation

Location
- 270 South 8th Avenue; Brighton, Colorado 80601-2132; United States; 39°58′52″N 104°48′43″W

Information
- Type: Public high school
- School district: Brighton 27J School District
- CEEB code: 060145
- Principal: Dr. Kerry Chisnall
- Staff: 136
- Faculty: 93.04 (FTE)
- Grades: 9-12
- Enrollment: 1,773 (2023–2024)
- Student to teacher ratio: 19.06
- Colors: Cherry and white
- Athletics: 5A
- Athletics conference: East Metro
- Mascot: Bulldog
- Website: brighton.sd27j.org

Brighton High School (BHS) is a secondary school located on South 8th Avenue in the heart of Brighton, Colorado, United States. It is one of three main high schools in the Brighton 27J School District. It is one of the first comprehensive high schools in Colorado.

== History ==
Brighton High School dates back to the early 20th century and is one of the first comprehensive high schools in Colorado. The school has been located in many different facilities over its existence, including its current facilities and what is now the Brighton High School & CTE/STEM Center.

== Campus ==
Brighton High School is located in the heart of Brighton, Colorado at 270 South 8th Avenue. The classrooms are divided into seven sections: WS (Wall Street), TA (Tech Avenue), SB (South Bulldog Avenue), NB (Main Hall/North Bulldog Avenue), CA (College Avenue), UA (University Avenue), and MOD (Modulars/Math Operations Drive).

== Facilities ==
The north hall (NB) of Brighton High School is the original section of the school, built in 1955. It is a two-story building which includes Bill Gamble's Gymnasium, a wrestling gymnasium, auditorium, the "Dawg Diner", locker bay, and various classrooms. The classrooms in this building serve as the location for most of the students' core classes. This section of the school has undergone many renovations, most notably in the late 1970s, early 1990s, and mid-2000s.

The Comprehensive Learning Center (CLC) is a facility built in 1973 as an additional building, separate from the main high school. It was constructed to alleviate overcrowding. This one-story building now includes the counseling office, gymnasium, locker rooms, band room, choir room, numerous computer labs, school store, auto shop, locker bay, and more classrooms. Classes in the CLC serve mainly as elective courses. This building also underwent renovations in the early 1990s, mid-2000s, and late 2022.

A 2006 addition/renovation (B) of the high school relieved the overcrowding, as the school was then at over double capacity. The construction of the central hall allowed for a roofed walkway and lobby to connect the north hall to the CLC. The renovation included the construction of a lobby, library, main office, drama wing, athletic offices, locker rooms, and weight room. Supplementing this addition was the creation of the district's second high school, Prairie View High School.

Modulars, or "mods," have also been placed on the campus of the school since the 2000s to allow for extra class room. The numbers of mods has increased over the years in over to allow for more classroom space, but after the 2006 addition/renovation, the number decreased. As the city of Brighton continued to expand, another temporary modular was installed. There are currently five mods on school grounds, each containing two classrooms. They serve as the location for all math classes, as there is no other room in the other buildings.

== Courses ==
=== Advanced Placement ===
The school participates in weighed grades for students taking Honors and/or Advanced Placement courses for the class of 2010 and beyond. For each Honors class, a student receives an additional 0.5 credit on their GPA for each class taken. Likewise, in an AP class, a student receives an additional 1.0 credit on their GPA for each class.

== Extracurricular activities ==
=== Athletics ===
Brighton High School is a member of the 5A East Metro League of the Colorado High School Activities Association. The school offers a variety of sports for all three school seasons:

Fall

- Cross-country
- Football
- Boys' golf
- Boys' soccer
- Girls' softball
- Boys' tennis
- Girls' volleyball

Winter

- Boys' basketball
- Girls' basketball
- Girls' swimming/diving
- Wrestling

Spring

- Boys' baseball
- Girls' golf
- Lacrosse
- Girls' soccer
- Girls' tennis
- Track & field
- Boys' swimming/diving

All seasons

- Cheerleading
- Dance

=== Drama ===
In 2008, students who were part of the International Thespian Society at Brighton High School were chosen to perform their act, The Seussification of Romeo and Juliet, at the Colorado Thespian Conference and at the International Thespian Festival.

In 2018 the department was nominated for Best Overall Production (among 7 other nominations) at the Bobby G awards for their rendition of Once on This Island.

=== Controversies ===
In 2024 a family decided to sue the 27J school district regarding concerns at one of their high schools (it is still not clear yet that it was Brighton High School in particular - this is still to be disclosed) for secretly advising their daughter to transition. The parents stated they had a right to be notified. It is claimed that the student approached counsellors at the school with depression and anxiety, noting a feeling of gender dysphoria - whereupon they encouraged her to begin using a non-female name and pronouns at school and referred her to mental health treatment through a state portal called 'iMatter', where a therapist discussed hormone therapy and a mastectomy.
