= Denver's Art District on Santa Fe =

Denver's Art District on Santa Fe (ADSF) is an Arts and Cultural district, encompassing hundreds of artists, galleries, studios, theaters, and creative businesses along Santa Fe Drive in Denver, Colorado. ADSF is a 501(c)(3), nonprofit membership organization.

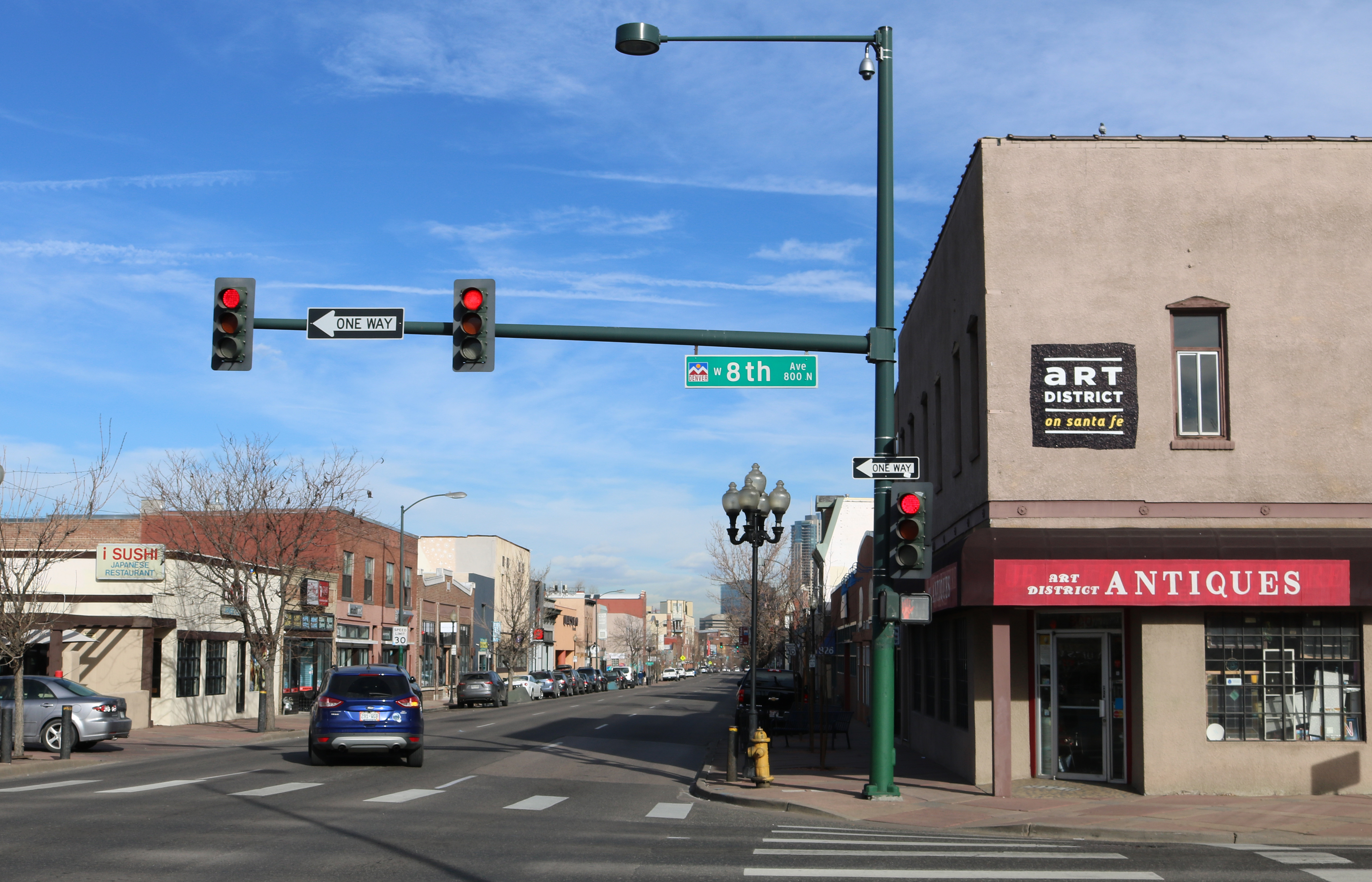
The Arts District, looking north along Santa Fe Drive from 8th Avenue.

The organization was formed in 2003 and became one of the first Certified Creative Districts in the state of Colorado in 2012.

Denver's Art District on Santa Fe spans from West 13th Avenue on the North to West Alameda Avenue on the South, and Kalamath Street on the West to Inca Street on the East. It is primarily located in the La Alma-Lincoln Park neighborhood in Denver, but it also overlaps the Baker neighborhood. This stretch of Santa Fe was once a buffalo migration route, and the first settlers arrived in the mid-1800s. The area was home to waves of immigrants, initially from Europe and Russia, followed by Mexicans fleeing the Revolution of 1910. Many of the buildings in the district have large murals on their exteriors, often containing imagery from the local Chicano culture.

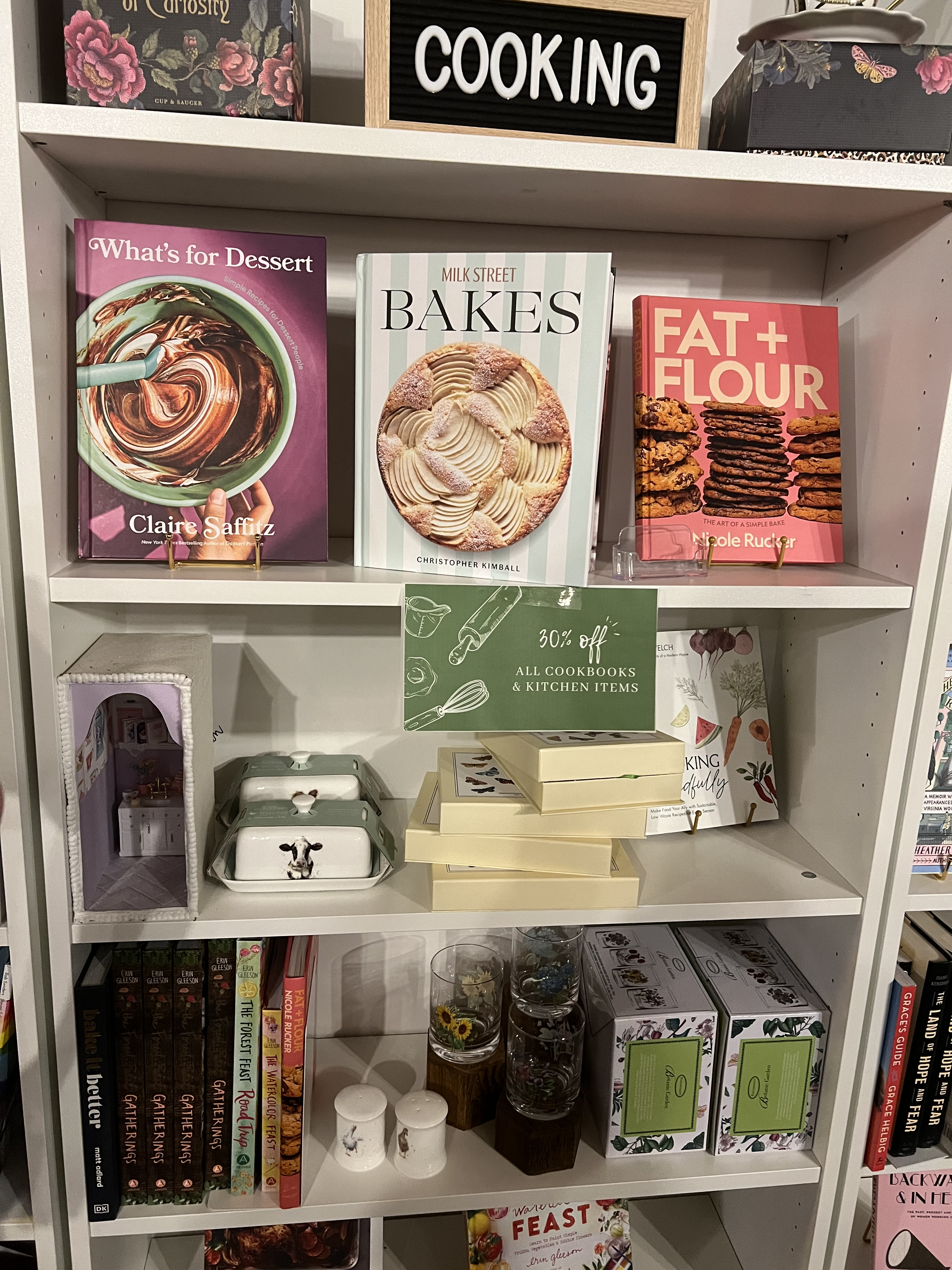
Cookbooks At Santa Fe Art Walk Denver June 6 2025

It is home to such institutions as:

- Colorado Ballet
- DIME Denver
- Museo de las Americas
- Su Teatro Cultural & Performing Art Center

First Friday Art Walks are the signature event of Denver's Art District on Santa Fe. These free events occur every month, year round, and draw up to 15,000 attendees in the summer months. In 2016, the organization launched "The Art of Brunch," a free art gallery brunch crawl. In 2017, "Art on Film" was launched. The program provides free, arthouse movie screenings outdoors alongside live music and food trucks.

Westword named the Art District on Santa Fe the "Best Art District" in 2017. It also was awarded the Mayor's Award for Excellence in the Arts in 2012.
