= Adams City High School =

Location
- 7200 Quebec Parkway; Commerce City, Colorado 80022; United States; 39°49′42″N 104°54′4″W

Information
- Former name: Union High School
- School type: Public high school
- Established: 1908
- School district: Adams County 14
- CEEB code: 060000
- NCES School ID: 080195000010
- Principal: Chris Garcia
- Teaching staff: 73.34 (on an FTE basis)
- Grades: 9–12
- Gender: Coeducational
- Enrollment: 1,586 (2023–24)
- Student to teacher ratio: 21.63
- Campus type: Rural, Fringe
- Colors: Orange and green
- Athletics conference: Colorado
- Mascot: Eagle
- Feeder schools: Adams City Middle School; Kearney Middle School
- Website: achs.adams14.org

Adams City High School is a high school located in Commerce City, Colorado, United States. It is a part of Adams County School District 14. Commerce City was originally known as Adams City.

== History ==
Adams City High School was first known as Union High School No. 1 when it was created in 1908. The directors of the Adams City, Derby, and Rose Hill school districts, along with Katherine M. Cook, the County Superintendent of Schools, established the school in Adams County. Other districts in Adams County, Cline (now known as Welby), and Irondale, declined to participate.

When the Union High School was created, the school directors utilized a room in a school house built in 1907 at 69th Avenue and Cherry Street, which had previously been criticized for being too large for the needs of the community. Classes began in September 1908 with around 12 students in attendance. Ida Walker was the teacher that first year.

In 1909, Frances Pratt Douglass became the teacher, and she was instrumental in the students' and school's success until she retired in 1917. She encouraged her students, took them on field trips, and began the tradition of class news reports being written by the students and published in the Brighton Blade newspaper for the community to read.

Students came from as far as three miles away on horseback, on bicycles, or on foot. A shed for the horses was provided.

The first graduation occurred in the spring of 1910.

In the 1910-1911 school year, students organized and created the athletics program. The first sport they played was basketball; they purchased a ball and basket, then built their own uprights out of felled cottonwoods and backboards out of an old boxcar door. Members of the community who owned cars volunteered to transport the players and supporters to games against other school teams.

The class sizes grew as the community grew, and the first expansion building was built in 1916.

In 1946, the surrounding districts were formed into Adams County School District No. 14 (ACSD14), and Union High School became Adams City High School. The school's colors, originally purple and gold, became green and gold. The eagle was chosen as the mascot. The first official Adams City High School graduating class commenced in 1949.

The football field was dedicated to Edward Krogh in 1948.

The Adams City Field House, located at 4601 East 68th Avenue, was built in 1959-1960, and was shared by the students and the community. In 1961, it was dedicated to Alfred Krogh, the Vice President of the ACSD14 Board of Education and son of Edward Krogh.

In 2008, the original Adams City High School location at 4525 East 68th Avenue closed. Classes began in the new school on Quebec Parkway in the fall of 2009.

== Notable alumni ==
- Ronnie Bradford, National Football League (NFL) defensive back
- Jared Deaguero, Adams State Hall of Fame (Wrestling) 2-time All-American, 2007 NCAA Division II 184-pound champion, 2008 NCAA Division II, 184-pound fourth place finisher
- Thomas Deaguero (Tom), National Wrestling Hall of Fame
- Scott Hewit, University of Northern Colorado Hall of Fame (Wrestling) four-time All-American at UNC, won the 1999 DII Championship at the 157 lb.
