= Adams County School District 14 =

School district in Colorado, United States

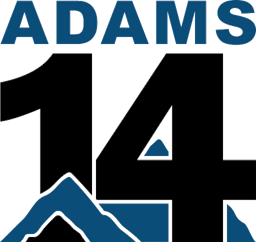

Address
- 5291 East 60th Avenue Commerce City, Colorado, 80022; United States
- Coordinates: 39°48′21″N 104°55′37″W

District information
- Type: Unified school district
- Grades: P–12
- Established: 1906; 120 years ago
- Superintendent: Karla Loría
- School board: 5 members
- Schools: 2 preschool, 6 elementary, 2 middle, 2 high
- Budget: $96,772,000
- NCES District ID: 0801950

Students and staff
- Students: 5,484
- Teachers: 336.03 (on an FTE basis)
- Staff: 771.21 (on an FTE basis)
- Student–teacher ratio: 16.32

Other information
- Website: adams14.org

Adams County School District 14 (a.k.a. Adams 14) is a school district headquartered in Commerce City, Colorado.

The district includes Derby and sections of Commerce City.

== History ==
Beginning in 2010 the district began experiencing issues with its accreditation.

In 2018 the State of Colorado requested the district to work with MGT Consulting LLC, an outside management company. The outside management arrangement began in June 2019.

In 2022 the district stopped using the company and asked for a new one. That year, the State of Colorado began a reorganization process of the district. The district opposed the move.

In 2024 the enrollment was over 5,000. The State of Colorado organized a review panel to examine the district's performance. In 2024 the panel stated that the district had "early indicators of progress", according to its report, but that more needed to be done.

== Schools ==
High schools

- Adams City High School (comprehensive)
- Lester Arnold High School (alternative)

Junior High

- Summit Heights Jr. High School

Middle schools

- Adams City Middle School
- Kearney Middle School

Elementary schools

- Alsup Elementary School
- Central Elementary School
- Dupont Elementary School
- Kemp Elementary School
- Monaco Elementary School
- Rose Hill Elementary School

Preschools

- Mildred L. Sanville Preschool
- STARS Early Learning Center
