= Commerce City, Colorado =

City in Colorado, US

- Home rule city
- City of Commerce City
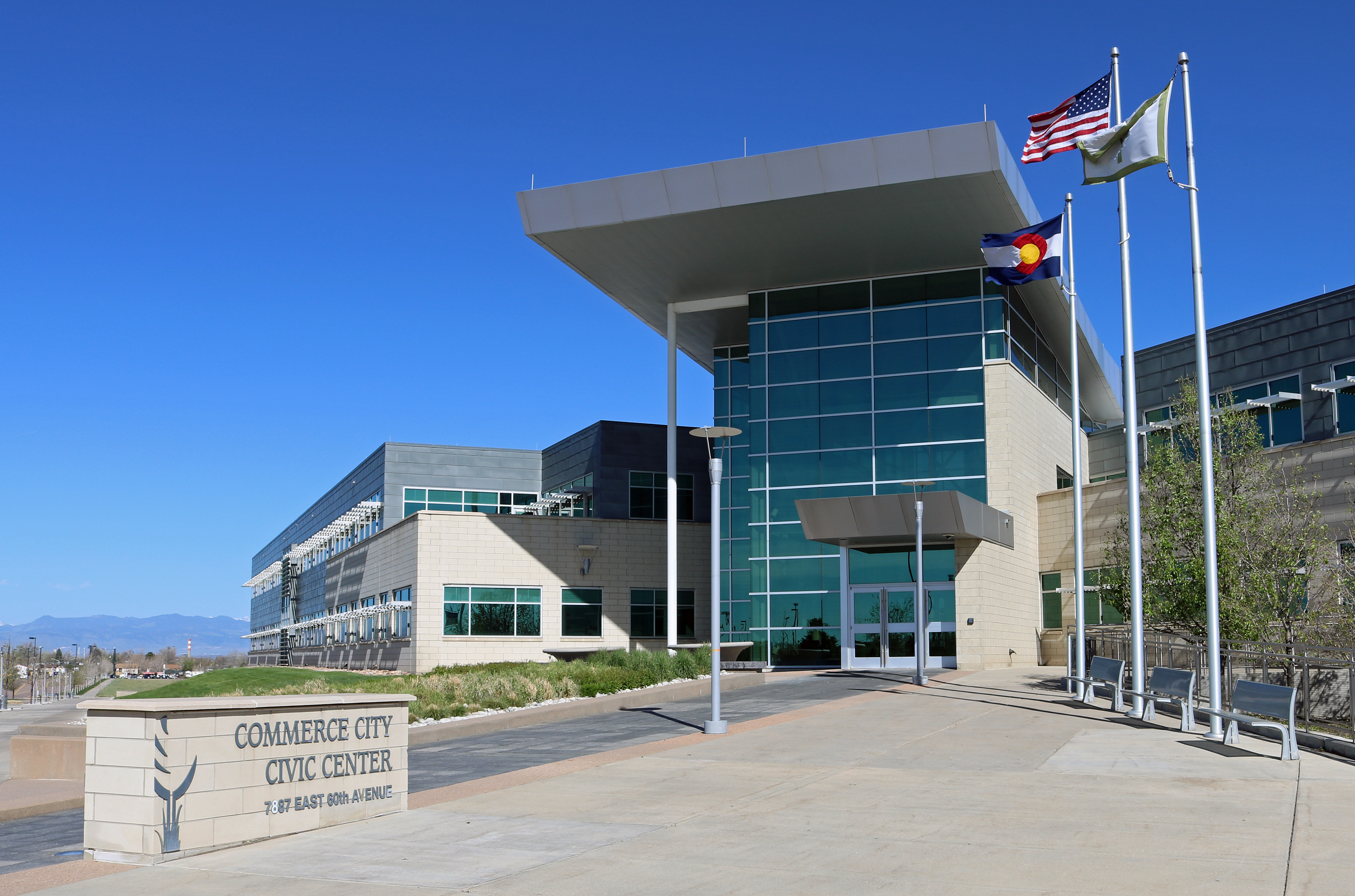
- Commerce City Civic Center at 60th Avenue and Trenton Street

- Flag

- Location of the City of Commerce City in Adams County, Colorado
- Coordinates: 39°52′45″N 104°47′17″W
- Country: United States
- State: Colorado
- County: Adams
- Incorporated as town: December 12, 1952, as Town of Commerce Town
- Incorporated as city: 1962 as City of Commerce City

Government
  - Type: Home rule city

Area
  - Home rule city: 36.399 sq mi (94.273 km^{2})
  - Land: 36.002 sq mi (93.246 km^{2})
  - Water: 0.397 sq mi (1.027 km^{2})
- Elevation: 5,191 ft (1,582 m)

Population (2020)
  - Home rule city: 62,418
  - Density: 1,734/sq mi (670/km^{2})
  - Metro: 2,963,821 (19th)
  - CSA: 3,623,560 (17th)
  - Front Range: 5,055,344
- Time zone: UTC−07:00 (MST)
  - Summer (DST): UTC−06:00 (MDT)
- ZIP code: 80022 & 80037 (PO Box)
- Area codes: 303/720/983
- GNIS city ID: 2410212
- FIPS code: 08-16495
- Website: www.c3gov.com

Commerce City is a home rule city located in Adams County, Colorado, United States. The city population was 62,418 at the 2020 United States census, a 35.95% increase since the 2010 United States census. Commerce City is the 18th most populous municipality in Colorado. Commerce City is located north of Denver and is a part of the Denver-Aurora-Centennial, CO Metropolitan Statistical Area and the Front Range Urban Corridor.

Commerce City is known for being the home of the Rocky Mountain Arsenal National Wildlife Refuge with its only entrance located in the city. Dick's Sporting Goods Park, a premier soccer stadium facility in Commerce City, hosts the Colorado Rapids of Major League Soccer.

== History ==
In 1859 after fighting in Bleeding Kansas, John D. "Colonel Jack" Henderson built a ranch, trading post, and hotel on Henderson Island in the South Platte River in Arapahoe County, Kansas Territory north of Denver, from which he sold meat and provisions to gold seekers on their way up the South Platte River Trail to the gold fields during the Pikes Peak Gold Rush. Henderson Island was the first permanent settlement in the South Platte River Valley between Fort Saint Vrain in the Nebraska Territory and the Cherry Creek Diggings in the Kansas Territory. Henderson Island is today the site of the Adams County Regional Park and Fairgrounds.

Among the first establishments in the modern Commerce City were cemeteries. Riverside Cemetery, founded in 1876, is located in the city's southwest corner at East 52nd Avenue and Brighton Boulevard. Rose Hill Cemetery, in the heart of historic Commerce City, was established in 1892 on what at the time was an open plain by the United Hebrew Cemetery Association.

The first school in the area began in 1871 as a one-room schoolhouse, with other schools added in 1899 and later in 1907. This latter school is now part of the North Building at the former site of Adams City High School, now Adams 14 School District Administration Buildings.

Several towns were founded in this part of Adams County in the 19th century. Derby, a Burlington Railroad station in 1887, was laid out as a town in 1889, although it was largely vacated by 1891. Irondale was first settled in 1889, named after a foundry that was opened that year. It was incorporated as the town of Irondale in 1924, but unincorporated in the 1930s due to increasing vacancy. Meanwhile, Adams City was laid out in 1903, with developers hoping the county seat would be established there; however, Brighton was elected county seat in 1904 and Adams City was vacated in 1922.

Until the late 1920s, the area was devoted to agriculture, including wheat fields, dairies, and pig farms. Industry moved in, with a refinery established in 1930 and grain elevators built in the late 1930s. Rocky Mountain Arsenal was founded in 1942 due east of the growing community.

In 1946 and 1947, Adams County School District 14 was formed from surrounding schools, and Adams City was redeveloped about that time. In 1951, as Denver was considering annexing the area, a plan to incorporate all of southern Adams County was developed. In July 1952, area residents voted 251 to 24 to incorporate Commerce Town, comprising neighborhoods such as Rose Hill and southern Adams City. Commerce Town annexed part of Derby in 1962, increasing the population over fourfold, enough for the town to gain the status of a city. The city name was duly changed to Commerce City. In April 2007, the citizens of Commerce City voted more than 2:1 to retain their city's name.

The Mile High Kennel Club, a greyhound racing park founded in 1949, is no longer operational. Purchased by the Commerce City Urban Renewal Authority (CCURA) in 2011, the site is an officially designated urban renewal area, which allows tax increment financing to be used as a funding source for the redevelopment. The CCURA and City Council adopted an updated Master Developer Agreement for the Mile High Greyhound Park in July 2019, and the project broke ground in October 2020.

A new Adams City High School has been constructed on land at 72nd and Quebec streets. This was formerly part of the Rocky Mountain Arsenal. The new school campus opened in 2009.

== Geography ==
Commerce City comprises a downtown area, and northern community stretching north of Denver International Airport.

At the 2020 United States census, the city had a total area of 23,295 acres (94.273 km^{2}), including 254 acres (1.027 km^{2}) of water.

=== Climate ===
Climate data for Commerce City, Colorado
Month	Jan	Feb	Mar	Apr	May	Jun	Jul	Aug	Sep	Oct	Nov	Dec	Year
Mean daily maximum °F (°C)	47 (8)	48 (9)	56 (13)	63 (17)	72 (22)	82 (28)	88 (31)	85 (29)	78 (26)	66 (19)	54 (12)	45 (7)	65.3 (18.5)
Mean daily minimum °F (°C)	22 (−6)	23 (−5)	29 (−2)	36 (2)	44 (7)	51 (11)	57 (14)	56 (13)	48 (9)	38 (3)	28 (−2)	21 (−6)	37.75 (3.19)
Source: Accuweather

== Demographics ==
Historical population
Census	Pop.	Note	%±
1960	8,970		—
1970	17,407		94.1%
1980	16,234		−6.7%
1990	16,466		1.4%
2000	20,991		27.5%
2010	45,913		118.7%
2020	62,418		35.9%
2024 (est.)	70,245	▲	12.5%
U.S. Decennial Census

=== 2020 census ===
As of the 2020 census, Commerce City had a population of 62,418. The median age was 32.4 years. 30.3% of residents were under the age of 18 and 7.8% of residents were 65 years of age or older. For every 100 females there were 102.4 males, and for every 100 females age 18 and over there were 100.9 males age 18 and over.

99.6% of residents lived in urban areas, while 0.4% lived in rural areas.

There were 19,145 households in Commerce City, of which 49.1% had children under the age of 18 living in them. Of all households, 55.9% were married-couple households, 16.6% were households with a male householder and no spouse or partner present, and 19.9% were households with a female householder and no spouse or partner present. About 14.8% of all households were made up of individuals and 4.5% had someone living alone who was 65 years of age or older.

There were 19,860 housing units, of which 3.6% were vacant. The homeowner vacancy rate was 1.2% and the rental vacancy rate was 4.2%.

Racial composition as of the 2020 census
Race	Number	Percent
White	32,049	51.3%
Black or African American	2,636	4.2%
American Indian and Alaska Native	1,085	1.7%
Asian	1,974	3.2%
Native Hawaiian and Other Pacific Islander	111	0.2%
Some other race	12,493	20.0%
Two or more races	12,070	19.3%
Hispanic or Latino (of any race)	30,505	48.9%

=== 2000 census ===
As of the census of 2000, there were 20,991 people, 6,668 households, and 4,974 families residing in the city. The population density was 812.2 inhabitants per square mile (313.6/km^{2}) under the age of 18, 11.5% from 18 to 24, 30.6% from 25 to 44, 18.1% from 45 to 64, and 9.2% who were 65 years of age or older. The median age was 30 years. For every 100 females, there were 109.3 males. For every 100 females age 18 and over, there were 111.1 males.

The demographic breakdown of the city shows a composition of 74.15% White, 3.39% African American, 1.23% Native American, 2.46% Asian, 13.15% from other races, and 5.62% from two or more races. Hispanic or Latino individuals of any race constitute 46.8% of the total population.

The median income for a household in the city was $69,268 and the median wage in the city was $54,340. The labor force was 28,684 with 31,086 jobs residing within the city. About 15.3% of families and 19.4% of the population were below the poverty line, including 22.5% of those under age 18 and 15.1% of those age 65 or over.

== Economy ==
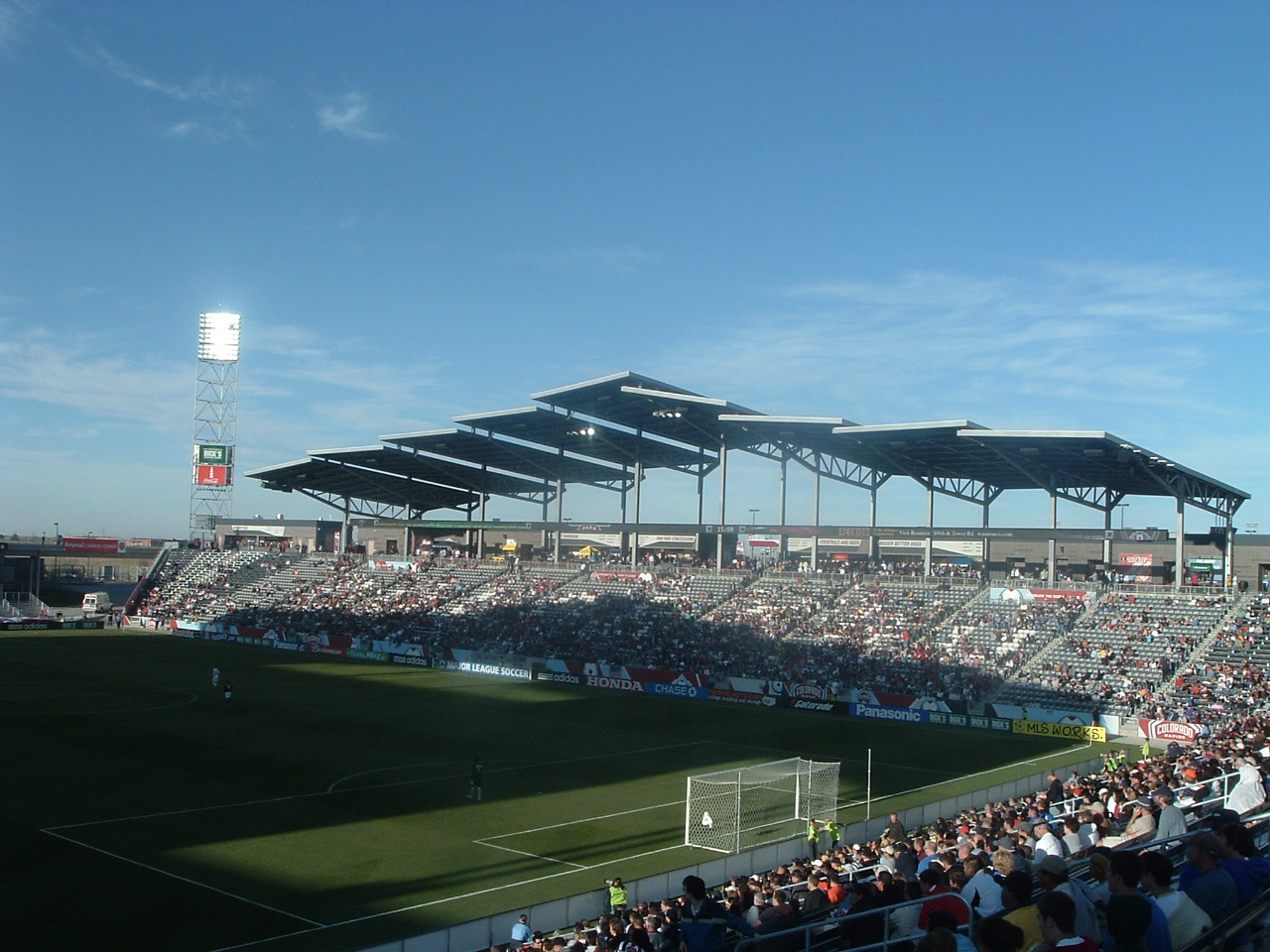
Dick's Sporting Goods Park in Commerce City, home of the Colorado Rapids Major League Soccer franchise

Commerce City is home to an oil refinery with a capacity of 98,000 barrels per day (15,600 m^{3}/d). Originally, this facility existed as two separately owned refineries, one on each side of Brighton Boulevard.

Suncor Energy bought the west refinery from ConocoPhillips in 2003. A project to upgrade this facility began in August of that year.

Suncor purchased the east refinery from Valero in June 2005 with the eventual goal of combining the two operations. As a result of a lawsuit by the U.S. Environmental Protection Agency (EPA) and a number of states (including Colorado) alleging violations of the Clean Air Act, Valero agreed in June 2005 to make pollution-reducing changes to its refineries, including the Commerce City facility. Suncor's purchase agreement included an assumption of all liability from this suit.

The west refinery's upgrade project, named "Project Odyssey," was extended to the east refinery. The west plant was shut down in February 2006 to complete the upgrade, while the east plant continued to refine 34,000 barrels (5,400 m^{3}) of oil per day. The completion of the $445 million project was announced in June 2006 and allows Suncor to meet the EPA's mandate to reduce the sulfur content of diesel fuel. It also gives the refinery the ability to process Suncor's Canadian sour crude oil sands. The combined facility is the largest refinery in the Rocky Mountain region.

== Parks and recreation ==
The city features 840 acres (340 ha) of parks and open spaces with 25 miles (40 km) of connecting trail system. There are two recreation centers run by the city, and a pool.

The Rocky Mountain Arsenal National Wildlife Refuge is the largest land-based, urban wildlife refuge in the United States, featuring 27 square miles (70 km^{2}) of open lakes, wetlands, and grasslands.

== Education ==
Adams County school districts 27J and Adams 14 each include portions of Commerce City.

The latter district's comprehensive high school is Adams City High School.

== Notable people ==
- Ronnie Bradford (born 1970), football defensive back
- Dominick Moreno (born 1985), Colorado state legislator
- Joe Rogers (1964–2013), former Lieutenant Governor of Colorado
- JoAnn Windholz, Colorado state legislator

== See also ==
- Denver-Aurora-Centennial, CO Metropolitan Statistical Area
- Denver-Aurora-Greeley, CO Combined Statistical Area
- Front Range Urban Corridor
