= Brighton, Colorado =

Home-rule city and seat of Adams County, Colorado, USA

- Home rule city
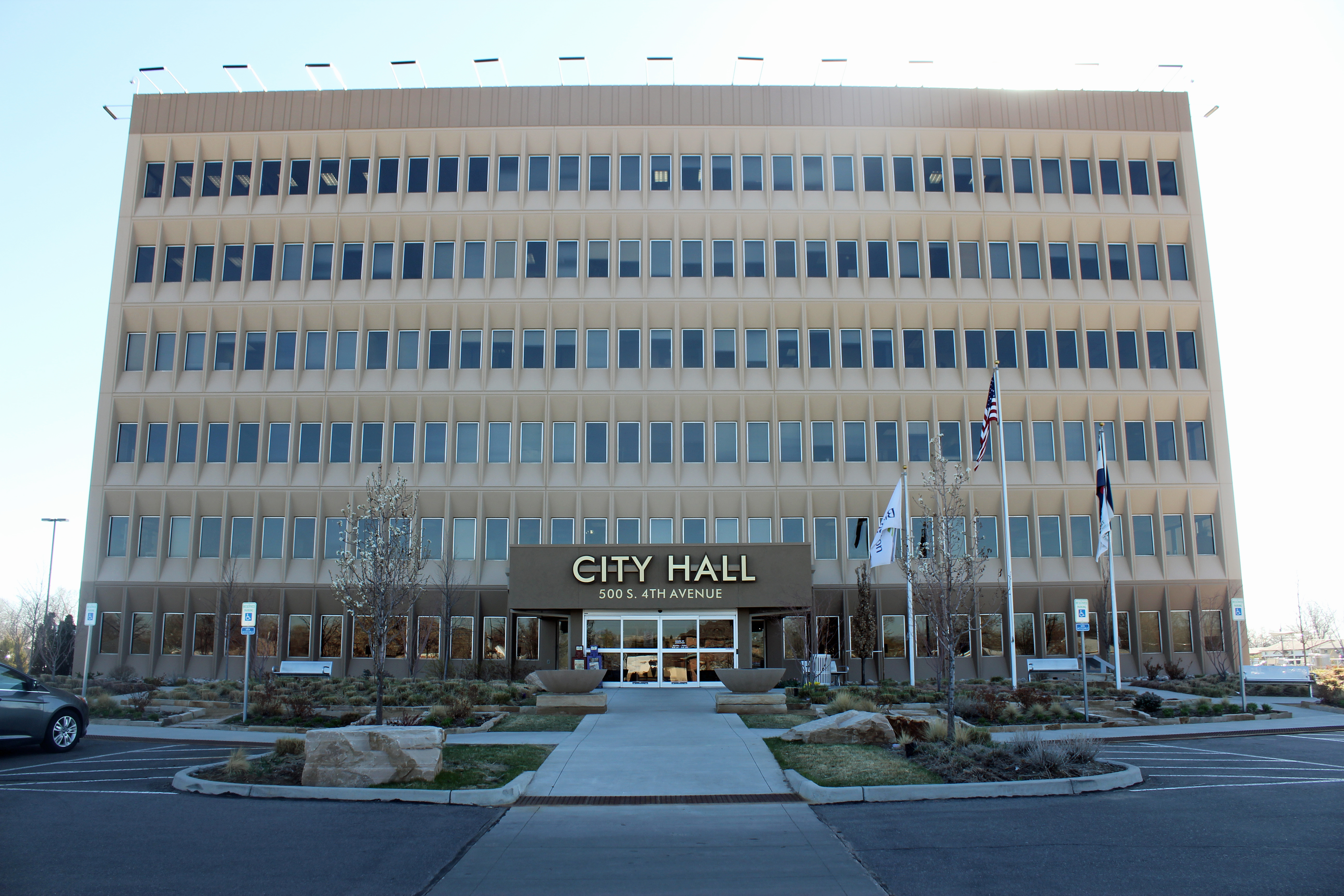
- Brighton City Hall

- Flag
- Motto: "What we value today is what we become tomorrow"
- Location within Adams and Weld counties, Colorado
- Coordinates: 39°58′50″N 104°46′10″W
- Country: United States
- State: Colorado
- Counties: Adams County seat and Weld County
- Incorporated: September 1, 1887
- Named for: Brighton Beach, New York

Government
  - Type: Home rule city

Area
  - Total: 21.536 sq mi (55.777 km^{2})
  - Land: 21.247 sq mi (55.030 km^{2})
  - Water: 0.288 sq mi (0.747 km^{2})
- Elevation: 4,987 ft (1,520 m)

Population (2020)
  - Total: 40,083
  - Density: 1,887/sq mi (729/km^{2})
- Time zone: UTC−07:00 (MST)
  - Summer (DST): UTC−06:00 (MDT)
- ZIP code: 80601-80603
- Area codes: 303/720/983
- GNIS town ID: 2409911
- FIPS code: 08-08675
- Website: City of Brighton

Brighton is a home rule city located in Adams and Weld counties, Colorado, United States. Brighton is the county seat of Adams County and is a part of the Denver-Aurora-Greeley, CO Combined Statistical Area and the Front Range Urban Corridor. The city population was 40,083 at the 2020 United States census with 39,718 residing in Adams County and 365 residing in Weld County.

== History ==
Brighton was founded as a stage/railroad depot and farming community named Hughes. The Hughes, Colorado Territory, post office opened on April 13, 1871, Colorado became a state on August 1, 1876, and the Hughes post office was renamed Brighton on August 4, 1879. The town was named for Brighton Beach, New York.

The Town of Brighton was incorporated on September 1, 1887. Adams County was created on April 15, 1901, with Brighton as its seat.

== Geography ==
At the 2020 United States census, the city had a total area of 13,783 acres (55.777 km^{2}), including 185 acres (0.747 km^{2}) of water.

=== Climate ===
According to the Köppen Climate Classification system, Brighton has a cold semi-arid climate, abbreviated BSk on climate maps.

Climate data for Brighton, Colorado, 1991–2020 normals, extremes 1973–present
Month	Jan	Feb	Mar	Apr	May	Jun	Jul	Aug	Sep	Oct	Nov	Dec	Year
Record high °F (°C)	74 (23)	80 (27)	90 (32)	91 (33)	99 (37)	104 (40)	105 (41)	104 (40)	100 (38)	90 (32)	84 (29)	77 (25)	105 (41)
Mean maximum °F (°C)	65.3 (18.5)	67.7 (19.8)	76.3 (24.6)	82.4 (28.0)	90.5 (32.5)	97.8 (36.6)	100.5 (38.1)	97.8 (36.6)	93.8 (34.3)	85.1 (29.5)	74.2 (23.4)	65.5 (18.6)	101.0 (38.3)
Mean daily maximum °F (°C)	44.4 (6.9)	45.9 (7.7)	55.9 (13.3)	62.9 (17.2)	71.9 (22.2)	84.1 (28.9)	90.0 (32.2)	87.6 (30.9)	79.8 (26.6)	65.9 (18.8)	53.3 (11.8)	44.0 (6.7)	65.5 (18.6)
Daily mean °F (°C)	30.2 (−1.0)	32.2 (0.1)	41.3 (5.2)	48.4 (9.1)	57.5 (14.2)	68.3 (20.2)	74.1 (23.4)	72.0 (22.2)	63.6 (17.6)	50.4 (10.2)	39.1 (3.9)	30.2 (−1.0)	50.6 (10.3)
Mean daily minimum °F (°C)	16.1 (−8.8)	18.5 (−7.5)	26.7 (−2.9)	33.9 (1.1)	43.2 (6.2)	52.4 (11.3)	58.2 (14.6)	56.4 (13.6)	47.4 (8.6)	35.0 (1.7)	25.0 (−3.9)	16.3 (−8.7)	35.8 (2.1)
Mean minimum °F (°C)	−5.7 (−20.9)	−2.6 (−19.2)	9.4 (−12.6)	20.4 (−6.4)	29.8 (−1.2)	42.7 (5.9)	50.9 (10.5)	48.5 (9.2)	35.1 (1.7)	18.9 (−7.3)	5.4 (−14.8)	−4.7 (−20.4)	−13.5 (−25.3)
Record low °F (°C)	−23 (−31)	−24 (−31)	−13 (−25)	−8 (−22)	19 (−7)	34 (1)	44 (7)	41 (5)	19 (−7)	0 (−18)	−14 (−26)	−26 (−32)	−26 (−32)
Average precipitation inches (mm)	0.42 (11)	0.43 (11)	0.98 (25)	1.77 (45)	2.35 (60)	1.41 (36)	1.72 (44)	1.77 (45)	1.18 (30)	1.02 (26)	0.69 (18)	0.37 (9.4)	14.11 (360.4)
Average snowfall inches (cm)	5.2 (13)	5.3 (13)	6.0 (15)	3.1 (7.9)	0.5 (1.3)	0.0 (0.0)	0.0 (0.0)	0.0 (0.0)	0.2 (0.51)	3.2 (8.1)	5.8 (15)	5.2 (13)	34.5 (86.81)
Average precipitation days (≥ 0.01 in)	3.9	4.4	5.6	6.9	8.3	6.6	6.9	6.1	5.4	4.9	4.4	3.7	67.1
Average snowy days (≥ 0.1 in)	3.8	3.9	3.3	2.1	0.3	0.0	0.0	0.0	0.2	1.1	3.1	3.9	21.7
Source 1: NOAA
Source 2: National Weather Service

== Demographics ==
Historical population
Census	Pop.	Note	%±
1890	306		—
1900	366		19.6%
1910	850		132.2%
1920	2,715		219.4%
1930	3,394		25.0%
1940	4,029		18.7%
1950	4,336		7.6%
1960	7,055		62.7%
1970	8,309		17.8%
1980	12,773		53.7%
1990	14,203		11.2%
2000	20,905		47.2%
2010	33,352		59.5%
2020	40,083		20.2%
2024 (est.)	43,473	▲	8.5%
U.S. Decennial Census

=== 2020 census ===
As of the 2020 census, Brighton had a population of 40,083. The median age was 33.9 years. 26.9% of residents were under the age of 18 and 11.5% of residents were 65 years of age or older. For every 100 females there were 100.9 males, and for every 100 females age 18 and over there were 99.3 males age 18 and over.

97.1% of residents lived in urban areas, while 2.9% lived in rural areas.

There were 13,246 households in Brighton, of which 41.3% had children under the age of 18 living in them. Of all households, 53.3% were married-couple households, 16.3% were households with a male householder and no spouse or partner present, and 23.4% were households with a female householder and no spouse or partner present. About 19.8% of all households were made up of individuals and 7.9% had someone living alone who was 65 years of age or older.

There were 13,945 housing units, of which 5.0% were vacant. The homeowner vacancy rate was 1.5% and the rental vacancy rate was 7.7%.

Racial composition as of the 2020 census
Race	Number	Percent
White	24,291	60.6%
Black or African American	622	1.6%
American Indian and Alaska Native	798	2.0%
Asian	774	1.9%
Native Hawaiian and Other Pacific Islander	95	0.2%
Some other race	6,236	15.6%
Two or more races	7,267	18.1%
Hispanic or Latino (of any race)	17,051	42.5%

=== 2000 census ===
As of the census of 2000, there were 20,905 people, 6,718 households, and 5,058 families living in the city. The population density was 1,224.1 inhabitants per square mile (472.6/km^{2}). There were 6,990 housing units at an average density of 409.3 per square mile (158.0/km^{2}). The racial makeup of the city was 76.91% White, 0.99% African American, 1.47% Native American, 1.10% Asian, 0.04% Pacific Islander, 16.29% from other races, and 3.20% from two or more races. Hispanic or Latino of any race were 38.22% of the population.

There were 6,718 households, out of which 40.2% had children under the age of 18 living with them, 58.6% were married couples living together, 11.9% had a female householder with no husband present, and 24.7% were non-families. 19.7% of all households were made up of individuals, and 8.5% had someone living alone who was 65 years of age or older. The average household size was 2.92 and the average family size was 3.34.

In the city, the age distribution of the population shows 28.6% under the age of 18, 10.1% from 18 to 24, 32.7% from 25 to 44, 18.8% from 45 to 64, and 9.7% who were 65 years of age or older. The median age was 32 years. For every 100 females, there were 108.0 males. For every 100 females age 18 and over, there were 108.3 males.

The median income for a household in the city was $46,779, and the median income for a family was $53,286. Males had a median income of $35,686 versus $27,103 for females. The per capita income for the city was $17,927. About 6.1% of families and 9.4% of the population were below the poverty line, including 11.0% of those under age 18 and 8.6% of those age 65 or over.

== Economy ==
Brighton is the home of two Vestas manufacturing plants, a wind turbine blade factory and a nacelle manufacturing plant. The factories are valued at $290 million and will provide 1,350 employment opportunities: 650 in the blade factory and another 700 in the nacelle manufacturing plant. Groundbreaking for the factories took place on March 25, 2009.

The Prairie Center is a 396-acre (1.60 km^{2}) shopping center with a pedestrian-oriented retail village.

The Greater Brighton Chamber of Commerce and Tourism Bureau began helping small businesses in the Brighton community in 1955, paving the way for the expansion of Brighton retail, and manufacturing. The Brighton Chamber helped to secure Brighton as an Agritourism destination within the Denver Metro area for Farm Fresh Produce and opening the Brighton Visitors Center in May 2020. The Greater Brighton Chamber of Commerce is ranked the 14th Best Chamber in the Denver area per the Denver Business Journal.

== Education ==
School District 27J serves the Brighton community.

== Notable people ==
Notable individuals who were born in or have lived in Brighton

- John L. Kane Jr. (born 1937), U.S. federal judge
- Richard Ling (born 1954), Professor of Media Technology at Nanyang Technological University
- Dillon Serna (born 1994), soccer midfielder
- Brian Shaw, leading American strongman
- Angie Zapata (1989–2008), murder victim

== Sister city ==
Brighton has a sister city, as designated by Sister Cities International:

- Ziębice, Lower Silesian Voivodeship, Poland

== See also ==
- Kitayama Carnation Strike
