= Interstate 25 =

Interstate Highway in New Mexico, Colorado, and Wyoming

Interstate 25

Route information
- Length: 1,061.67 mi (1,708.59 km)
- Existed: 1957–present
- NHS: Entire route

Major junctions
- South end: I-10 / US 85 / US 180 in Las Cruces, NM
- I-40 in Albuquerque, NM; US 50 in Pueblo, CO; US 24 in Colorado Springs, CO; I-70 / US 6 / US 85 in Denver, CO; I-76 in North Washington, CO; I-80 in Cheyenne, WY; US 20 / US 26 / US 87 in Casper, WY
- North end: I-90 / US 87 in Buffalo, WY

Location
- Country: United States
- States: New Mexico, Colorado, Wyoming

Highway system
- Interstate Highway System; Main; Auxiliary; Suffixed; Business; Future

Interstate 25 (I-25), also known as the Pan-American Freeway, is a major Interstate Highway in the western United States. It is primarily a north–south highway, serving as the main route through New Mexico, Colorado, and Wyoming. I-25 stretches from I-10 at Las Cruces, New Mexico (approximately 25 miles [40 km] north of El Paso, Texas) to I-90 in Buffalo, Wyoming (approximately 60 miles [97 km] south of the Montana–Wyoming border). It passes through or near Albuquerque and Santa Fe in New Mexico; Pueblo, Colorado Springs, and Denver in Colorado; and Cheyenne and Casper in Wyoming. The I-25 corridor is mainly rural, especially in Wyoming, excluding the Albuquerque metropolitan area and the Front Range urban corridor from Pueblo to Cheyenne.

The part of I-25 in Colorado passes just east of the Front Range of the Rocky Mountains. That stretch was involved in a large-scale renovation named the Transportation Expansion (T-REX) Project in Denver and the Colorado Springs Metropolitan Interstate Expansion (COSMIX). These projects, and others in New Mexico, were necessary because these stretches of I-25 were originally inadequately designed and constructed (the pavement was deteriorating rapidly) and also because urban areas, like Albuquerque, Colorado Springs, and Denver, had tripled and quadrupled in population much earlier than anyone had anticipated back in the 1950s and 1960s. Major highway work for the T-REX project ended on August 22, 2006. The COSMIX project was completed in December 2007. Several other smaller improvement projects for I-25 are still ongoing within New Mexico and Colorado.

== Route description ==
Lengths
	mi	km
NM	462.12	743.71
CO	298.60	480.55
WY	300.95	484.33
Total	1,061.67	1,708.59

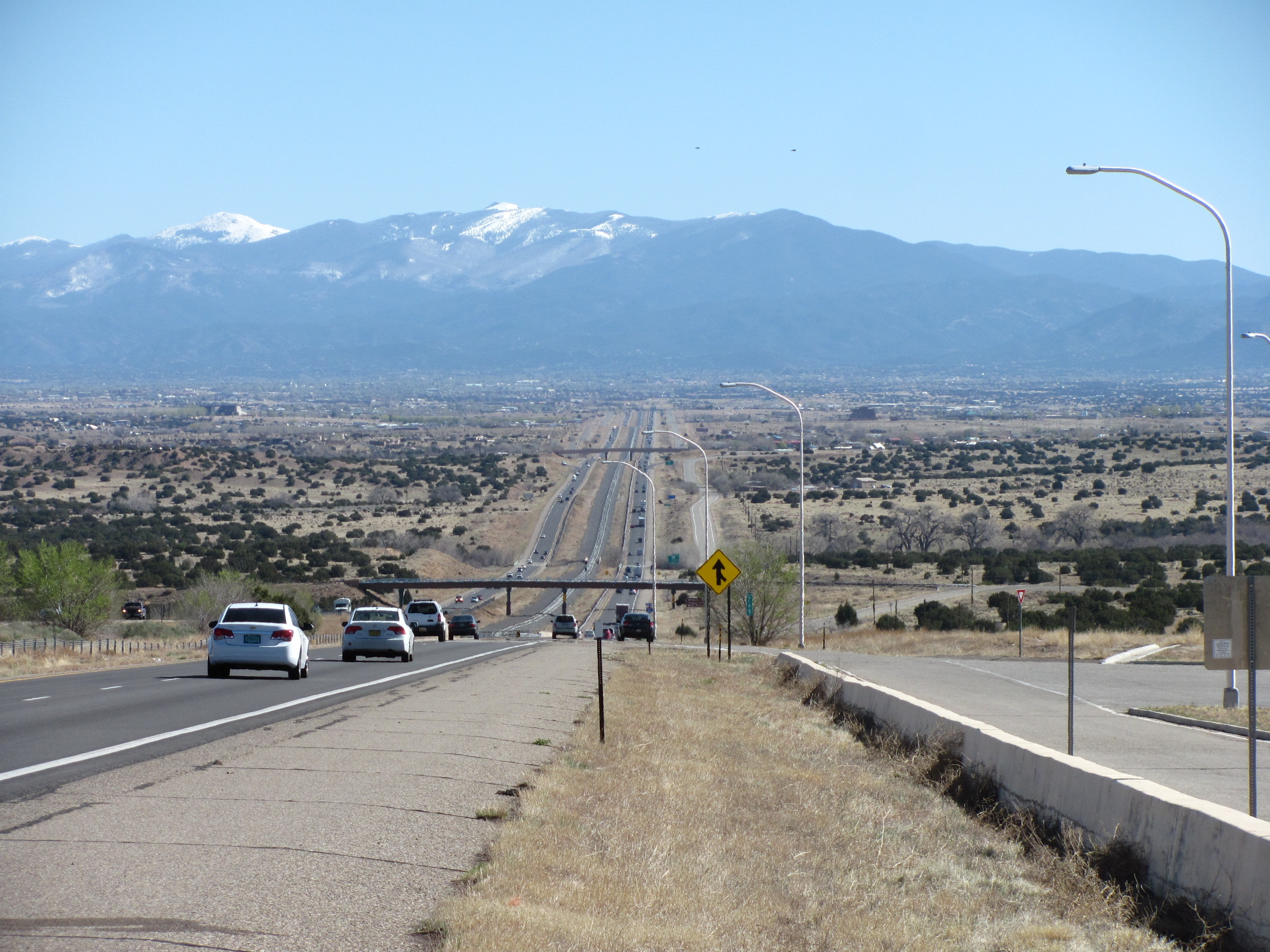
I-25 approaching Santa Fe, New Mexico

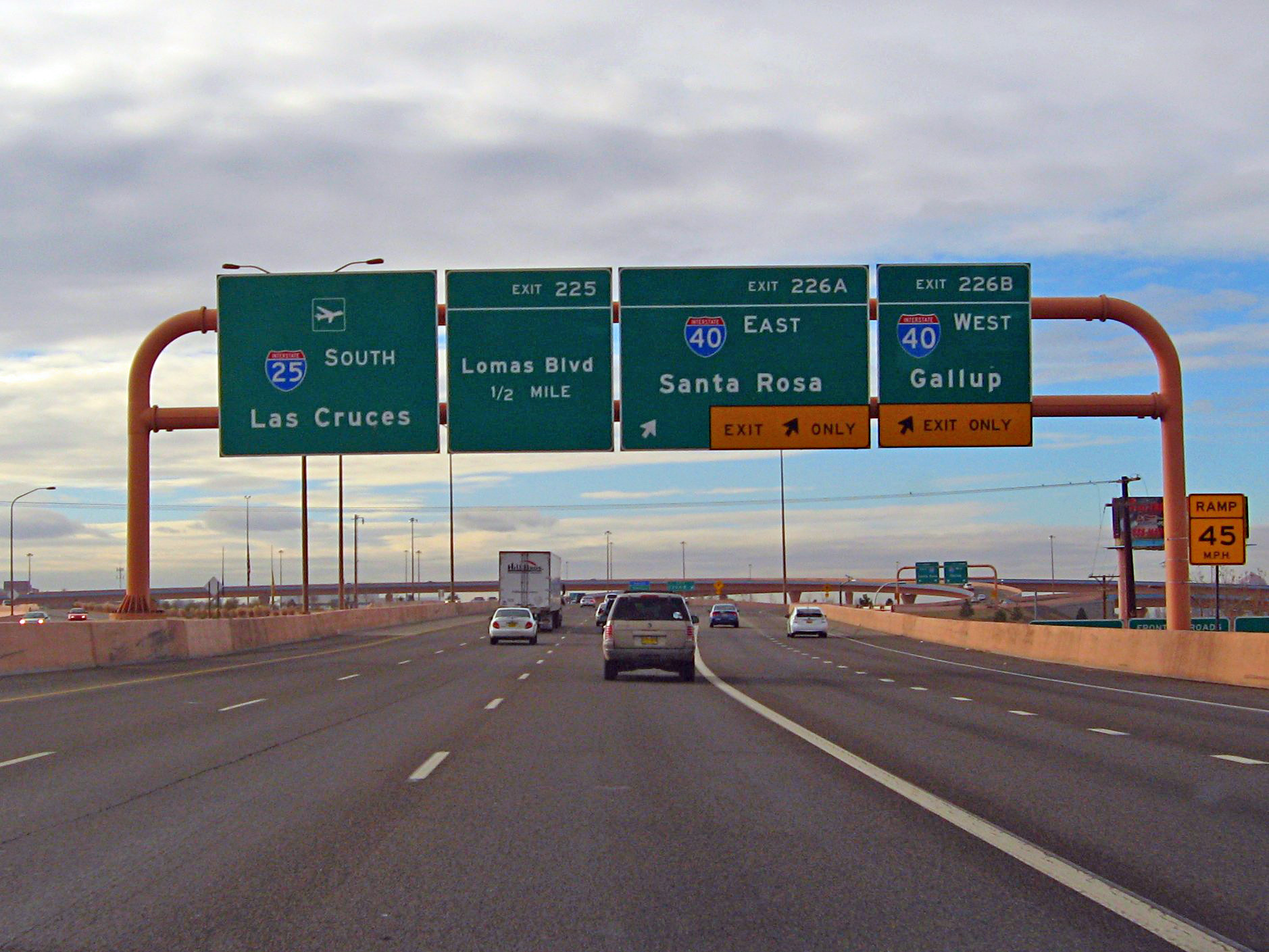
At the Big I in Albuquerque, New Mexico

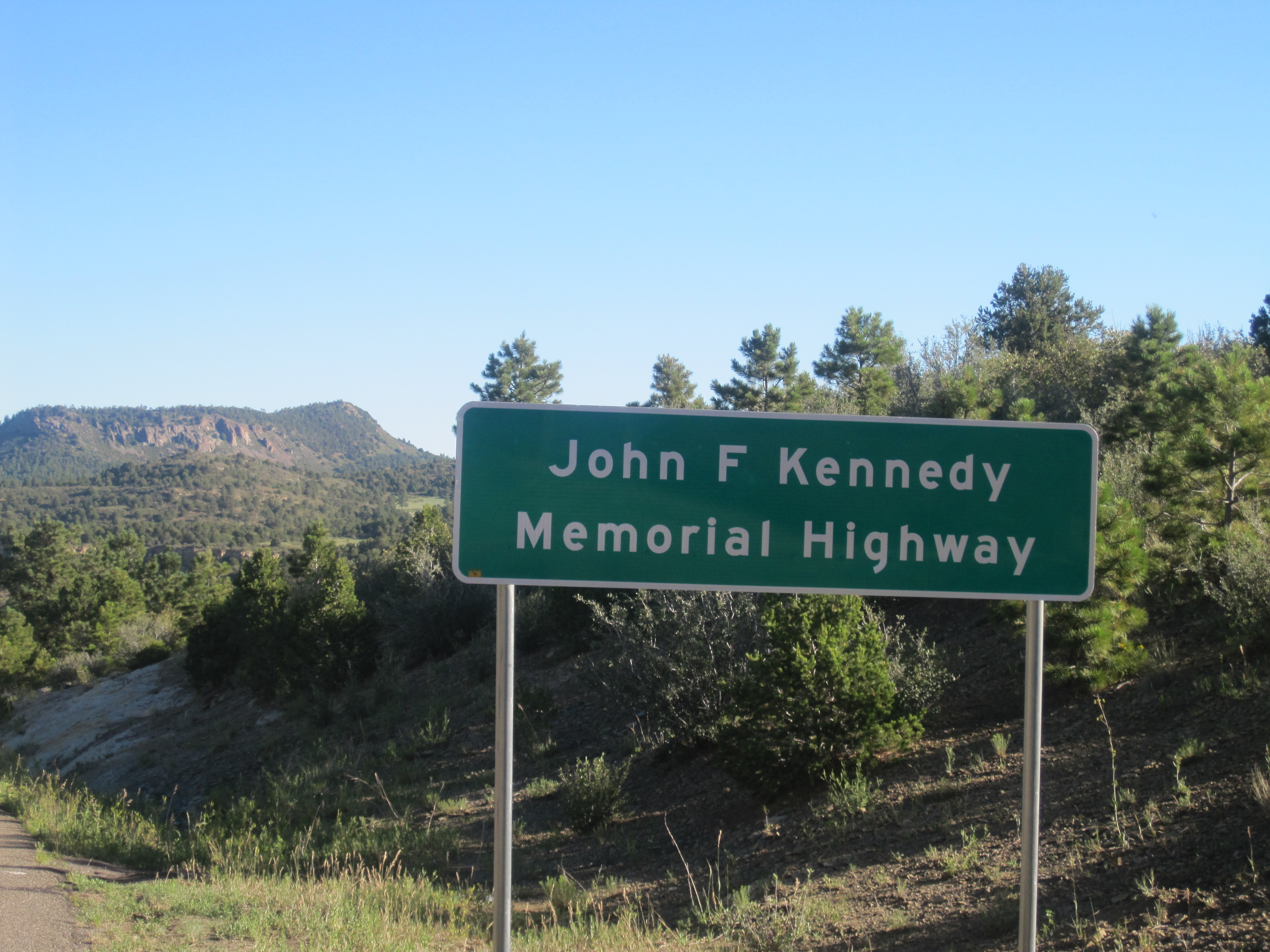
John F. Kennedy Memorial Highway in scenic southern Colorado

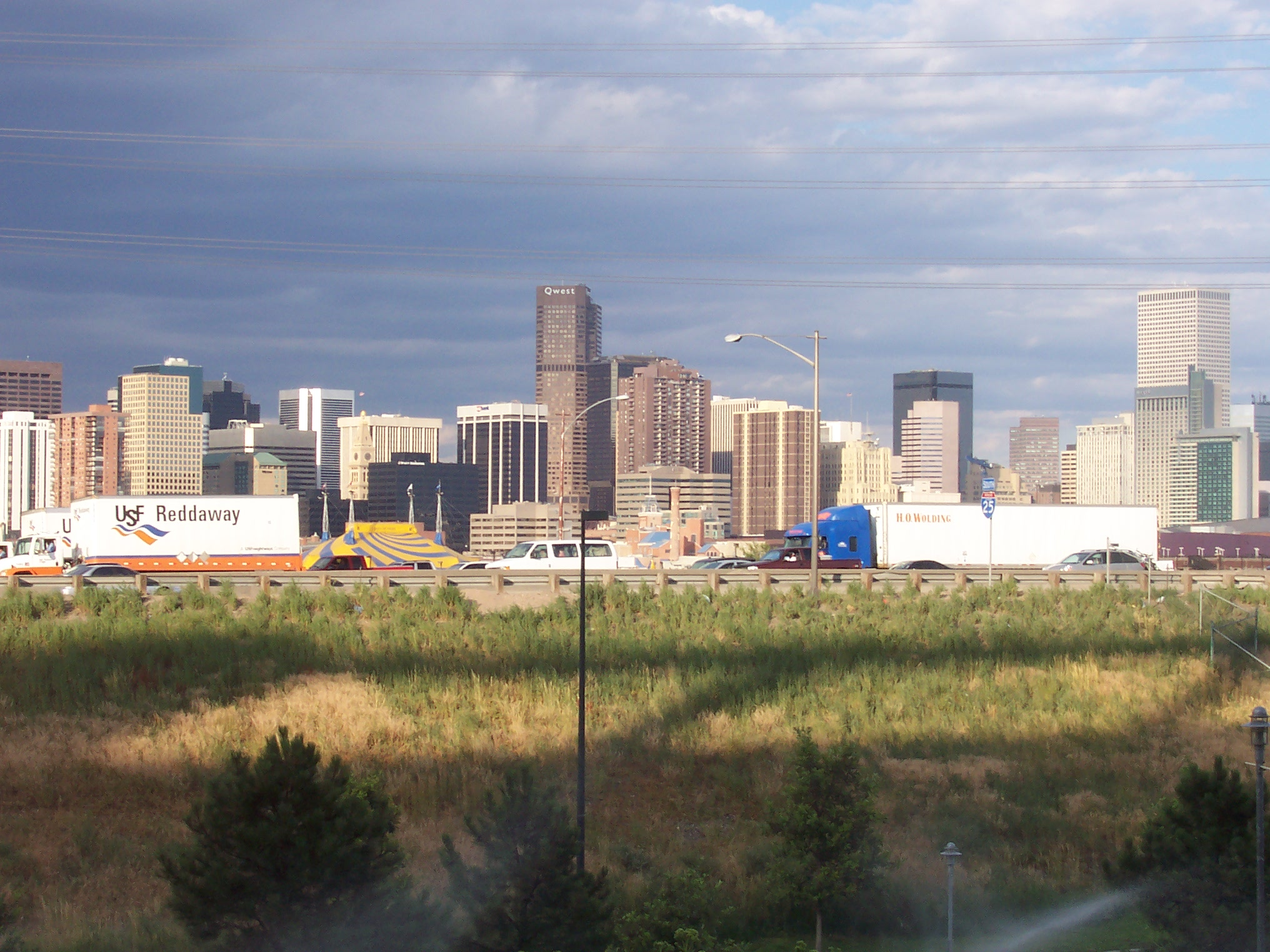
Rush hour on I-25 through downtown Denver

=== New Mexico ===
I-25 begins at I-10's exit 144 in Las Cruces, just south of the New Mexico State University campus. I-25 runs concurrently with US Route 85 (US 85) at this point and carries this concurrency for the entire length of its run in New Mexico. Immediately, three exits provide access to the city, including one for US 70. When I-25 reaches Truth or Consequences, it is parallel to Elephant Butte Lake State Park. From Las Cruces to Santa Fe, I-25 follows the route of the Camino Real de Tierra Adentro.

As I-25 nears Albuquerque, it has interchanges with highways such as US 380 and a concurrency with US 60. Further north, State Road 6 (NM 6), former US 66, meets up with I-25 in Los Lunas. Through Albuquerque, I-25 is named the Pan American Freeway, and there are frequent exits to city streets. A major interchange with I-40 (which is styled as the Coronado Freeway in the city) is named the Big I. It was given an honorable mention by the US Department of Transportation and the Federal Highway Administration for excellence in urban highway design in 2002.

Leaving Albuquerque to the north, I-25 curves to the northeast as it approaches Santa Fe. Continuing 'northbound' at Santa Fe, I-25 heads southeast for approximately 45 miles (72 km) traveling through the Santa Fe National Forest and crossing Glorieta Pass (elevation 7,452 ft or 2,271 m). It turns north again at Blanchard toward Las Vegas. The highway maintains a north and northeast orientation as it leaves New Mexico traversing Raton Pass (7,798 ft or 2,377 m) and enters Colorado. Due to its elevation and frequent winter snowstorms, I-25 is sometimes impassible and closed in both directions at Raton Pass during winter months. From Santa Fe to Trinidad, Colorado, I-25 approximates part of the route of the Santa Fe Trail. For its entire length in the state, I-25 shares its alignment with US 85, although the latter is unsigned.

=== Colorado ===
I-25 has many nicknames through the state's larger cities. In Denver, it is called the Valley Highway, as the highway parallels the course of the South Platte River throughout the downtown area and is often sunken below ground level. The section in El Paso County is named the Ronald Reagan Highway, and, through Pueblo, it is named the John F. Kennedy Memorial Highway.

In the Federal-Aid Highway Act of 1973, a transcontinental highway was named after President Dwight D. Eisenhower, in commemoration of the route of the US Army's 1919 convoy. This route, rather than following a single highway, spans several, including I-25 in Denver. This combination of routes was intended to approximate the original 1919 convoy route.

The designation of this highway, while clear in intent, has not seen widespread adoption in terms of signage or recognition, likely due to the irregular nature of the route. Despite this, a commemorative sign was installed in 1986 in the tourist information center off I-70 in Kansas City, Kansas. Congress attempted to honor Eisenhower's contributions to the Interstate System once more in 1990, leading to the renaming of the Interstate System as the "Dwight D. Eisenhower System of Interstate and Defense Highways".

I-25 enters Colorado 14 miles (23 km) south of the city of Trinidad. It is the main north–south route through Colorado with a length of 300 miles (480 km). The Interstate exits Colorado in the north about eight miles (13 km) south of Cheyenne, Wyoming. I-25 serves all the major cities in Colorado that are east of the Rocky Mountains, such as Denver, Colorado Springs, Pueblo, Fort Collins, and Greeley. For the entire distance in Colorado, from the north to the south, the Rocky Mountains are clearly visible.

There are also several important military and air bases and institutions along this route, such as Buckley Space Force Base, the Cheyenne Mountain Complex headquarters of NORAD, Fort Carson, Peterson Space Force Base, and the United States Air Force Academy.

I-25 crosses the Palmer Divide between Denver and Colorado Springs, providing some of the highway's most scenic views of the Rocky Mountains and its foothills. Blizzards and high winds on this stretch (particularly over Monument Hill) are notorious for causing traffic problems during the winter months.

The section of I-25 that is between the northern border of Pueblo County and the New Mexico state line is named the "John F. Kennedy Memorial Highway" in honor of President Kennedy's support of water resources development in the Arkansas River Valley.

=== Wyoming ===
I-25 enters Wyoming eight miles (13 km) south of the state capital, Cheyenne. After traveling through Cheyenne, I-25 continues north to Douglas, passing many plateaus and also railroad tracks. Commonly, very long trains can be seen slowly moving alongside this highway. Around Douglas, this Interstate Highway curves somewhat to the west toward Casper. Once through Casper, I-25 turns due north, and it goes as far as Buffalo, where it ends at an interchange with I-90. I-90 then provides the connection to Montana.

== History ==
The section in New Mexico between Romeroville and Los Lunas closely follows the original alignment of US 66, which was later shortened and realigned to run due west from Santa Rosa. Now, that has been replaced with I-40.

== Junction list ==
New Mexico
I-10 / US 85 / US 180 on the Las Cruces–University Park line. I-25/US 85 share an unsigned concurrency to Fountain, Colorado.
US 70 in Las Cruces
US 380 west of San Antonio
US 60 in Socorro. The highways travel concurrently to south-southwest of Abeytas.
I-40 in Albuquerque
US 550 in Bernalillo
US 84 / US 285 south of Santa Fe. I-25/US 84 travels concurrently to Romeroville. I-25/US 285 travels concurrently to Eldorado at Santa Fe. These are wrong-way concurrencies; driving east, one is on I-25 North and US 84 and 285 South.
US 64 south of Raton. The highways travel concurrently to Raton.
US 64 / US 87 in Raton. I-25/US 87 travels concurrently to southeast of Glenrock, Wyoming.
Colorado
US 160 in Trinidad. The highways travel concurrently to Walsenburg.
US 50 in Pueblo. The highways travel concurrently through Pueblo.
US 24 in Colorado Springs. The highways travel concurrently through Colorado Springs.
US 85 in Colorado Springs. The highways travel concurrently to Castle Rock.
I-225 in Denver
US 285 in Denver
US 85 in Denver. The highways travel concurrently through Denver.
US 6 in Denver. The highways travel concurrently through Denver.
US 40 / US 287 in Denver
I-70 / US 6 / US 85 in Denver
I-76 southeast of Twin Lakes
I-270 / US 36 on the Twin Lakes–Sherrelwood–Welby line
US 34 in Loveland
Wyoming
I-80 south-southwest of Cheyenne
US 30 southwest of Cheyenne
US 85 in Cheyenne. The highways travel concurrently to Ranchettes.
US 26 west-southwest of Dwyer Junction. The highways travel concurrently to southeast of Glenrock.
US 18 / US 20 in Orin. I-25/US 20 travels concurrently to southeast of Glenrock.
US 20 / US 26 / US 87 in Casper. I-25/US 20/US 26 travels concurrently to the Casper–Bar Nunn city line. I-25/US 87 travels concurrently to north-northeast of Buffalo.
US 16 in Buffalo
I-90 / US 87 north-northeast of Buffalo

== Related routes ==
- Business routes of Interstate 25
- Interstate 225
