= Colorado State Highway 224 =

State highway in Adams County, Colorado, United States

State Highway 224
- SH 224 highlighted in red

Route information
- Maintained by CDOT
- Length: 3.634 mi (5.848 km)

Major junctions
- West end: US 36 on Sherrelwood–Twin Lakes line
- I-25 / US 87 on Twin Lakes–Welby line; I-76 in Welby
- East end: US 6 / US 85 in Commerce City

Location
- Country: United States
- State: Colorado
- Counties: Adams

Highway system
- Colorado State Highway System; Interstate; US; State; Scenic
← SH 209	→ SH 227

State Highway 224 (SH 224) is a 3.634-mile (5.848 km) state highway in Adams County, Colorado, United States, that connects U.S. Route 36 (US 36) on the Sherrelwood–Twin Lakes line with U.S. Route 6/U.S. Route 85 (US 6/US 85) in Commerce City. SH 224 is locally signed as East 70th Avenue and East 74th Avenue.

== Route description ==
SH 224 begins at Broadway's three-ramp interchange with US 36 (Denver–Boulder Turnpike) just west of US 36's interchange with Interstate 25 and I-270 (Dwight D. Eisenhower Highway); there is no ramp from Broadway to eastbound US 36. SH 224 heads south along four-lane undivided Broadway through the unincorporated area of Twin Lakes. At Broadway's intersection with 70th Street, SH 224 turns east onto 70th Avenue; SH 53 begins at the intersection and heads south along Broadway. SH 224 heads east on 70th Avenue as a four-lane divided highway that has a partial interchange with I-25 allowing access to I-25 to and from Denver; the route also intersects a ramp toward Denver for the I-25 express lanes.

SH 224 continues into unincorporated Welby and curves northeast parallel to Clear Creek, reduces to two lanes, and passes under I-270 with no access. The route briefly expands to a four-lane divided highway around its intersection with York Street, where the route continues as 74th Avenue and veers away from Clear Creek. East of its bridge across the South Platte River north of its confluence with Clear Creek, SH 224 expands to a four-lane divided highway and crosses over the Regional Transportation District (RTD) N line rail line within its partial interchange with I-76, which allows access to I-76 to and from Denver. The highway enters the city of Commerce City and intersects Colorado Boulevard, which leads to the N Line's Commerce City/72nd station, on its way to its eastern terminus at US 6 and US 85 (Vasquez Boulevard).

== Major intersections ==
The entire route is in Adams County.

Location	mi	km	Destinations	Notes
Sherrelwood–Twin Lakes line	0.000	0.000	Broadway north	Continuation north from western terminus
Sherrelwood–Twin Lakes line	0.000	0.000	US 36 west (Denver-Boulder Turnpike) – Broomfield, Boulder	Western terminus; US 36 westbound on and off ramp and eastbound off ramp only; The interchange is also the western end of I-270
Twin Lakes	0.268	0.431	SH 53 south (Broadway) – North Washington, I-25/US 87	Northern end of SH 53
Twin Lakes			I-25 south / US 87 south (North Valley Highway) – Denver	I-25 exit 216B, southbound onramp
Welby			I-25 south	Southbound HOV only
Welby			I-25 south / US 87 south (North Valley Highway)	I-25 exit 216B, northbound off ramp
Welby			Bridge over the South Platte River	
Welby	2.750	4.426	I-76 west – I-270/US 36, I-25/US 36, I-70	Westbound on and eastbound off only; I-76 exit 8
Commerce City	3.634	5.848	US 6 north / US 85 north (CanAm Highway/Vasquez Boulevard) – Derby, I-76, Henderson, Brighton US 6 south / US 85 south (CanAm Highway/Vasquez Boulevard) – Denver	Eastern terminus T intersection
1.000 mi = 1.609 km; 1.000 km = 0.621 mi: HOV only; Incomplete access

== See also ==
- List of state highways in Colorado
