= Mapleton Public Schools =

School district in Adams County, Colorado

Address
- 7350 Broadway Denver, Colorado, 80221; United States
- Coordinates: 39°49′49″N 104°59′10″W

District information
- Type: Unified school district
- Motto: Achieve Your Dreams
- Grades: PK–12
- Established: 1955; 71 years ago
- Superintendent: Mike Crawford
- School board: 5 members
- Chair of the board: Thomas Moe
- Accreditation: Cognia
- Schools: 20
- Budget: $141,202,000
- NCES District ID: 0805550

Students and staff
- Students: 7,095
- Teachers: 404.57 (on an FTE basis)
- Staff: 914.21 (on an FTE basis)
- Student–teacher ratio: 17.54

Other information
- Website: mapleton.us

Mapleton Public Schools is a unified school district in Adams County, Colorado, based in the unincorporated community of Sherrelwood. It encompasses industrial and commercial areas immediately north of Denver, including North Washington and parts of Sherrelwood, Thornton, Twin Lakes, and Welby. In the 2024–25 academic year, the school district enrolled 7,095 students at twenty schools.

Unlike other school districts in the state, schools in Mapleton do not have attendance boundaries, and students and families can choose to attend any school in the district.

== History ==
Mapleton Public Schools was established in 1955 as Adams County School District 1 following the merger of two other districts. When Mapleton was founded, the district was primarily made up of farmland.

Up until the 2000s, the school district had performed poorly on state assessments.

In fall 2007, the district changed its school assignment policy to where all families in the district choose which schools they will send their children to, instead of having attendance boundaries for elementary and middle schools; previously the district had a single large comprehensive high school which covered the entire district. The schools were all made to be relatively small campuses, the district called them "small-by-design" schools. The district's only comprehensive high school, Skyview High School, closed at the end of the 2006–07 academic year and was replaced with several smaller high schools.

In 2019 the State of Colorado was looking for a temporary manager of the Adams 14 School District. Mapleton requested to be a potential manager of the district, along with three other organizations; the other three were not school districts. Adams 14 asked for Mapleton to temporarily operate its district. The Colorado State Board of Education however chose not to let Mapleton manage Adams 14.

== Academics ==
=== Enrollment and demographics ===
Mapleton Public Schools is located immediately north of Denver. It is centered on the junction of four freeways: Interstate 25 (I-25), I-76, I-270, and U.S. Route 36. Its boundaries encompass large parts of North Washington, Thornton, and Welby, as well as small parts of Sherrelwood and Twin Lakes.

In the 2024–25 academic year, there were 7,095 students enrolled in Mapleton's twenty schools. The district employed 914.21 staff members (on a full-time equivalent basis), including 404.57 classroom teachers, for a student-to-teacher ratio of 17.54. The demographic makeup of the district is mostly Hispanic (51%) and White (41%), and 9.9% of students speak English less than well.

=== Performance ===
Mapleton Public Schools was accredited with an improvement plan by the Colorado Department of Education in 2024.

== Governance ==
The district's superintendent is Mike Crawford.

== Schools ==
Mapleton has twenty schools, including a stand-alone preschool, four elementary schools (one for grades K–3 and three for K–6), one 4–8 intermediate school, six K–8 schools, one junior/senior high school, four high schools, one K–12 school, an online program, and an alternative high school for young adults. In addition to the stand-alone preschool, eight other schools offer a prekindergarten program. Ten of the schools are located on two campuses: the Skyview and Broadway Campuses, the latter of which also has the district headquarters. The other ten schools have their own locations.

Schools in Mapleton Public Schools
School	Grades	Enrollment (2024–25)	Location	Notes
Academy High School	9–12	399	Skyview Campus	
Achieve Academy	PK–8	370	Stand-alone	
Adventure Elementary	PK–6	429	Stand-alone	
Clayton Partnership School	K–8	430	Skyview Campus	
Explore PK–8	PK–8	557	Stand-alone	
Global Intermediate Academy	4–8	346	Broadway Campus	
Global Leadership Academy	9–12	400	Broadway Campus	
Global Primary Academy	PK–3	272	Broadway Campus	
Mapleton Early Career Preparation	9–12	306	Skyview Campus	
Mapleton Expeditionary School of the Arts	9–12	393	Skyview Campus	
Mapleton Online	K–12	152	Online	Physical presence at Broadway Campus
Meadow Community School	PK–8	378	Stand-alone	
Monterey Community School	K–8	440	Stand-alone	
North Valley School for Young Adults	9–12	102	Skyview Campus	Alternative high school for young adults up to age 21
Performing Arts School on Broadway	7–12	169	Broadway Campus	
Preschool on Poze	PK	193	Stand-alone	
Trailside Academy	PK–8	492	Stand-alone	
Valley View Innovation School	PK–6	183	Stand-alone	Adding grades until reaching PK–8
Welby Community School of the Arts	PK–6	308	Stand-alone	
York International School	K–12	776	Stand-alone	Offers an International Baccalaureate program
