= Gang activity in Denver =

Gang activity and associated crime is a long-standing concern in Denver, Colorado. The city's street gang activity received statewide attention in 1993 when a "Summer of Violence" increased public awareness of gang-related violence and led the state to enact harsh penalties for crime by juveniles. From 1992 to 1995, Denver had 331 murders: 95 in 1992, 74 in 1993, and 81 each in 1994 and 1995. In 1997, the first gang to ever be indicted out of Colorado was the West Side Ballerz Posse (WSBP), a Chicano gang that resided in West Denver and branched off into surrounding Adams County in cities such as Commerce City, Thornton, Brighton, and Westminster. In 1996, members of the FBI's Metro Gang Task Force (“MGTF”) were investigating suspected gang-related drug activity in Denver, Colorado. Specifically, MGTF was investigating members of the West Side Ballerz Posse whom it suspected were selling controlled substances and engaging in gang-related violence. As part of this investigation, a series of wiretaps were authorized in late 1996 against suspected members of this drug conspiracy. Gang-related crime has continued, as shown by the New Year's Day 2007 drive-by shooting of Broncos cornerback Darrent Williams by members of the Tre Tre Crips, an East Denver street gang. The Crips in the city have several sub-sets such as Tre Deuce (DOD), Tre Foe, 35 Outlaws and the Tre Tre Gangstas. In 2017, the city's police estimated that there were 14,000 gang members in Denver, affiliated with 220 gangs.

== Gangs ==
Two nationwide street gangs with predominant African-American memberships, the Crips and the Bloods, have had a sustained, powerful presence in the Denver area. There were an estimated 2000 Bloods and Crips native to the city of Denver. The Bloods and Crips in Denver exist in areas such as North-East Park Hill, East Denver, Aurora, Lakewood, Englewood, Commerce City, and Capitol Hill. Denver's Bloods and Crips have chosen Colorado Boulevard separating the two gangs. As of 2017, it was estimated that there were 20,000 Chicano gang members in the city, belonging to about 160 gangs. In 2009, law enforcement agencies identified a local Hispanic gang on Denver's west side known as the Gallant Knights Insane as having been responsible for crack cocaine and firearms trafficking, homicides, drive-by shootings, aggravated assaults, home invasions, and robberies in the area. They were founded by Gregorio Ramirez II, a.k.a. “West Side”, a long-time well-respected West Side Denver representative. He served a nearly 30 year sentence stemming from a bank robbery & other crimes with his wife Lillian Baca, the mother of his 3 daughters (M.Ramirez, S.Ramirez & L.Ramirez). Starting as “The Lipan Boyz”, later on becoming the “Gallant Knights Insane”, they were classy, well-dressed, violent chicanos who grew by the thousands across Denver & surrounding cities.

The 211 Crew was created by Benjamin Davis in 1995 as a new low-level white power gang in the county jail. It has since expanded throughout Colorado and reached the streets. Allied with the Aryan Brotherhood, the 211 Crew is known for brutal acts of violence, including the shooting of the director of the Colorado Department of Corrections, Tom Clements, at his home in 2013 as an act of revenge for moving gang shot callers and disrupting the gang's hierarchy. This gang is closely related to 303 Mafia, a tagging and drug trafficking gang that is also situated in the Englewood area. A Hispanic street gang called the North Side Mafia has been involved in various criminal activities such as homicide, robberies, and drug trafficking. The 18th Street gang, a Los Angeles gang, reportedly has had a large presence in Denver due to gang members who relocate to the city to avoid probation problems in Southern California. Other more nationally recognized street gangs in Denver include the Rollin' 30, located on Denver's East Side, Florencia 13, MS 13, Crenshaw Mafia Gangster Bloods, 83 Gangster Crips, Rollin' 60 Neighborhood Crips, Bounty Hunter Bloods, and Compton Crip Riders. Denver's gang activity has expanded into adjacent areas such as Aurora, Commerce City, Edgewater, Lakewood, Sheridan, Mountain View, Twin Lakes, Sherrelwood, Thornton, Federal Heights, and Englewood.

== Movement against gangs ==
There are social service groups in the community engaged in discouraging young people from becoming involved in gangs. Some of their efforts were featured on the TV program Gangland in March 2010 in an episode entitled "Mile High Killers" that was perceived locally as having misrepresented their work and possibly promoted violence between rival gangs. Also misrepresented were certain people featured. They spoke solemnly of the past and present and the hardened version of people which promoted gang violence in Denver boosting the amount of crime from 2017 to present.
