= Twin Lakes, Colorado =

Twin Lakes is the name of multiple communities in the U.S. state of Colorado :

- Twin Lakes, Adams County, Colorado
- Twin Lakes, Lake County, Colorado
