= Northglenn/112th station =

Commuter rail station in Northglenn, Colorado

Northglenn•112th
- Station platform and train in 2026

General information
- Location: 11355 York Street; Northglenn, Colorado
- Coordinates: 39.902679°N 104.960151°W
- Owner: Regional Transportation District
- Line: North Line
- Platforms: 1 side platform
- Tracks: 1
- Connections: RTD Bus: 7, 19, 112, Thornton FlexRide

Construction
- Structure type: At-grade
- Accessible: Yes

Other information
- Fare zone: Local

History
- Opened: September 21, 2020

Passengers
- 2025: 585 (average daily)
- Rank: 53 out of 75

Services
Preceding station	RTD	Following station
Eastlake/124th Terminus	N Line	Thornton Crossroads/104th toward Union Station
Location

Northglenn/112th station (sometimes stylized as Northglenn•112th) is a Regional Transportation District (RTD) commuter rail station on the N Line in Northglenn, Colorado. It is the only RTD rail station located within Northglenn. The station opened on September 21, 2020, along with the rest of the N Line.

== Station layout ==
1F

Platform Level

York Street; bus bays; parking
Side platform, doors will open on the left or right
← toward Eastlake/124th (Terminus) or toward Union Station (Thornton Crossroads/104th) →

Northglenn/112th station is located on the west side of York Street, north of 112th Avenue. It is situated at the far eastern edge of Northglenn. The neighborhood across the street from the station lies in Thornton, and the N Line quickly re-enters Thornton in both directions. The station only features a single platform and a single track, as the former Union Pacific right-of-way used by the N Line was not double-tracked as a part of its construction.

During the construction of the station, a trestle bridge spanning 209 feet was unearthed. The bridge dated back to 1909 and was backfilled by Union Pacific in 1951. Upon its discovery in 2016, it was deemed to be not of historical value and was eventually destroyed.
