= 48th & Brighton/National Western Center station =

Commuter rail station in Denver, Colorado

48th & Brighton•Nat'l Western Cntr
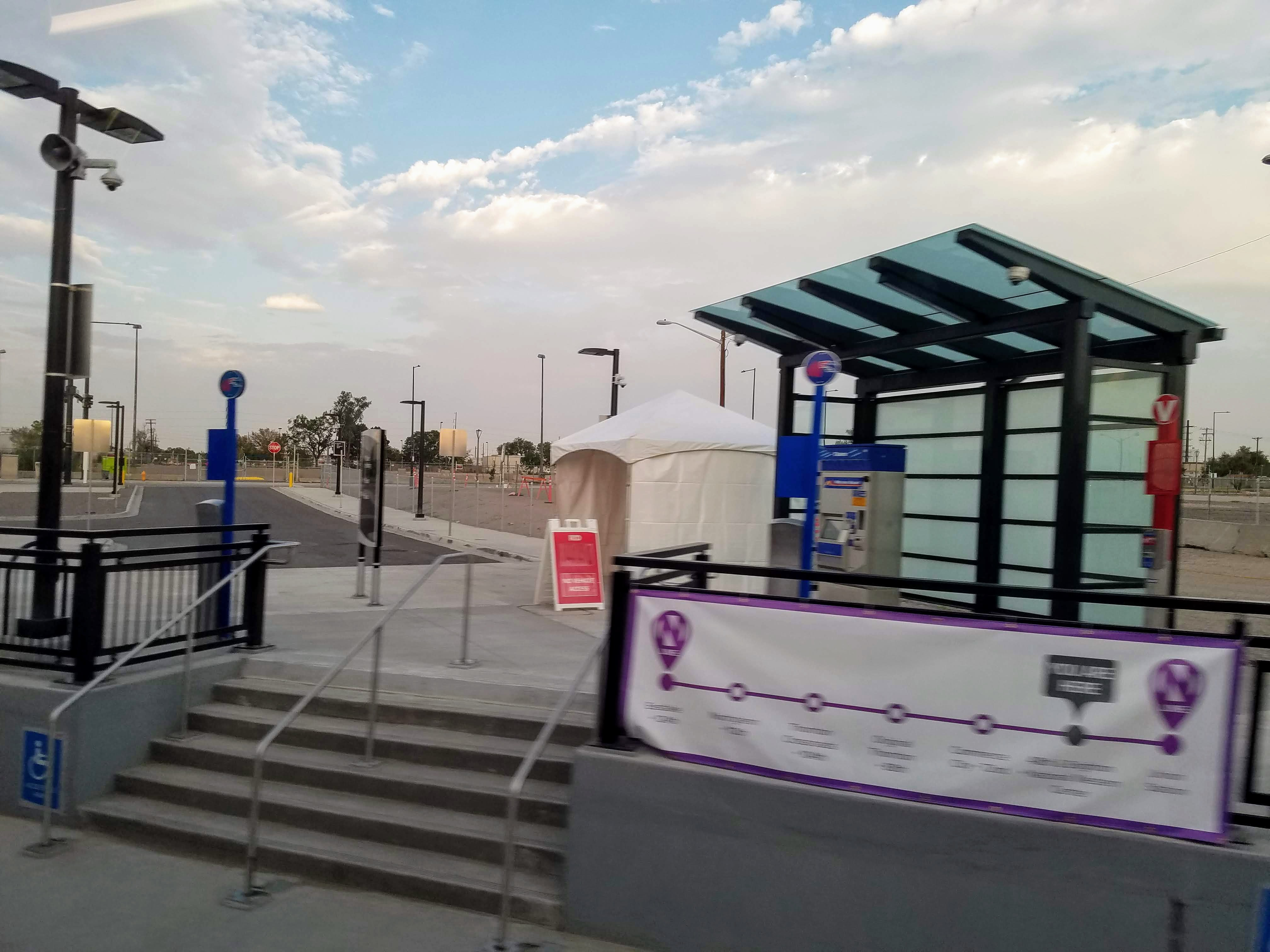
- 48th & Brighton / National Western Center station platform

General information
- Location: 4903 North Brighton Boulevard; Denver, Colorado
- Coordinates: 39°46′58.4″N 104°58′16.4″W
- Owner: Regional Transportation District
- Line: North Line
- Platforms: 2 side platforms
- Tracks: 2
- Connections: RTD Bus: 48

Construction
- Structure type: At-grade
- Accessible: Yes

Other information
- Fare zone: Local

History
- Opened: September 21, 2020

Passengers
- 2025: 360 (average daily)
- Rank: 63 out of 75

Services
Preceding station	RTD	Following station
Commerce City/72nd toward Eastlake/124th	N Line	Union Station Terminus
Location

48th & Brighton/National Western Center station (sometimes stylized and abbreviated as 48th & Brighton•Nat'l Western Cntr) is a Regional Transportation District (RTD) commuter rail station on the N Line in the Elyria-Swansea neighborhood of Denver, Colorado. It is the first station northbound from Union Station. The station opened on September 21, 2020, along with the rest of the N Line.

== Station layout ==
1F

Platform Level

North Brighton Boulevard; East 48th Avenue; bus bays
Side platform, doors will open on the right
Northbound
← toward Eastlake/124th (Commerce City/72nd)
Southbound
toward Union Station (Terminus) →
Side platform, doors will open on the right
National Western Center

The station is located adjacent to the National Western Center, from which it takes its name. The Denver Coliseum is located south of the station, on the other side of Interstate 70. Aside from the National Western Center, the land surrounding the station is mostly undeveloped. The Denver Skyway Bridge begins immediately to the north of the station; the N Line reduces to a single track along the bridge. The bridge runs nearly 2 miles to Commerce City/72nd station on the other side, making it the longest bridge in Colorado.

With a daily average of just 360 passengers, 48th & Brighton/National Western Center is the least used station on the N Line.
