= Original Thornton/88th station =

Commuter rail station in Thornton, Colorado

Original Thornton•88th
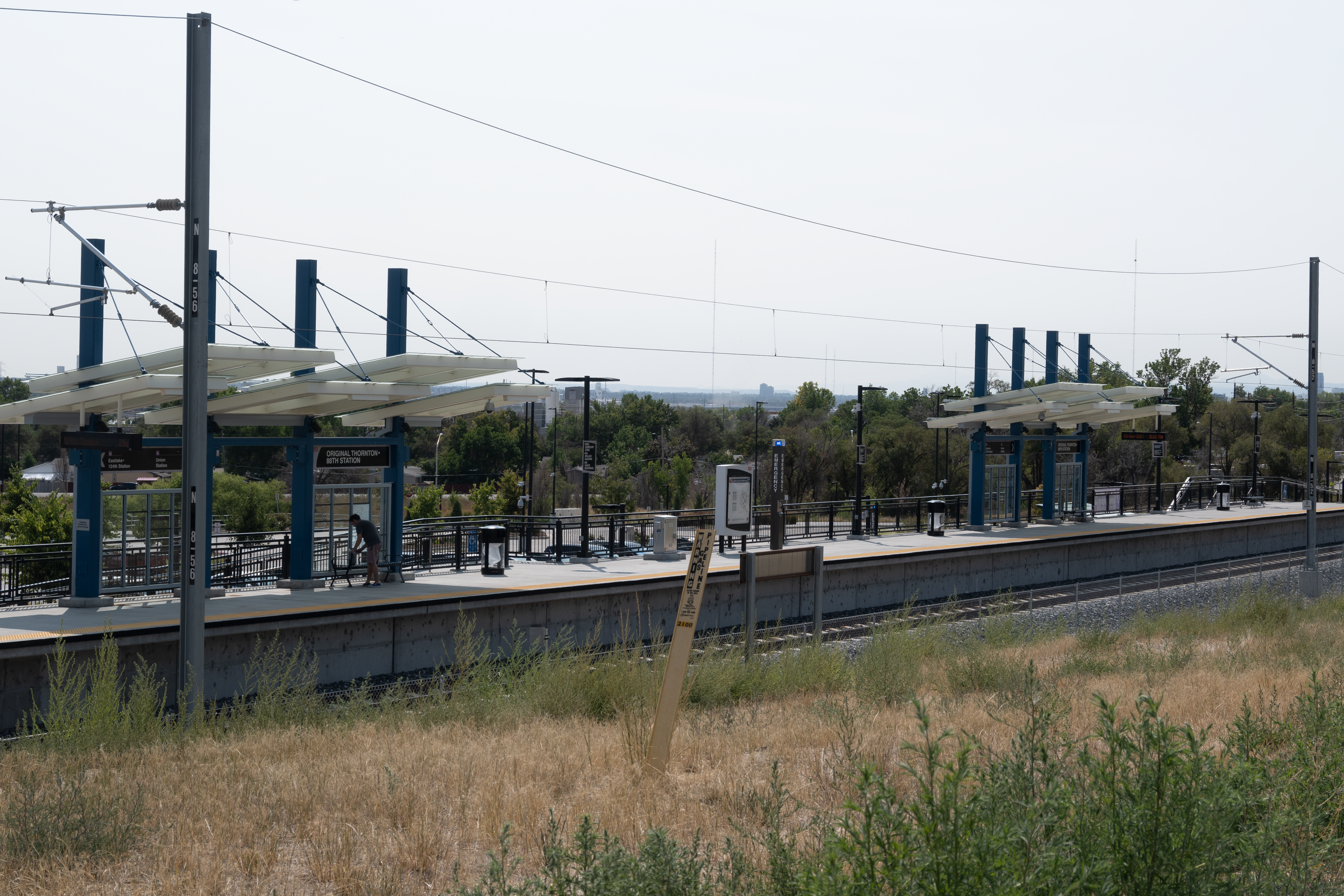
- Original Thornton/88th station platform

General information
- Location: 8989 Welby Road; Thornton, Colorado
- Coordinates: 39.858785°N 104.953080°W
- Owner: Regional Transportation District
- Line: North Line
- Platforms: 1 side platform
- Tracks: 1
- Connections: RTD Bus: 80 88L, 92, Thornton FlexRide

Construction
- Structure type: At-grade
- Parking: 550 spaces
- Accessible: Yes

Other information
- Fare zone: Local

History
- Opened: September 21, 2020

Passengers
- 2025: 610 (average daily)
- Rank: 51 out of 75

Services
Preceding station	RTD	Following station
Thornton Crossroads/104th toward Eastlake/124th	N Line	Commerce City/72nd toward Union Station
Location

Original Thornton/88th station (sometimes stylized as Original Thornton•88th) is a Regional Transportation District (RTD) commuter rail station on the N Line in Thornton, Colorado. The station opened on September 21, 2020, along with the rest of the N Line.

== Station layout ==
1F

Platform Level

Welby Road; bus bays; parking
Side platform, doors will open on the left or right
← toward Eastlake/124th (Thornton Crossroads/104th) or toward Union Station (Commerce City/72nd) →

The station is located north of 88th Avenue near its intersection with Welby Road; a section of Welby Road was moved to a new alignment in order to accommodate the station's construction. Though it sits in a single-family residential neighborhood, all of the land immediately adjacent to the station is undeveloped. The station itself only features a single platform and a single track, as the former Union Pacific right-of-way used by the N Line was not double-tracked as a part of its construction.
