= Colorado State Highway 53 =

State highway in Colorado, United States

State Highway 53
- Broadway Street
- SH 53 highlighted in red

Route information
- Maintained by CDOT
- Length: 1.663 mi (2.676 km)

Major junctions
- South end: I-25 / US 87 north of Denver
- North end: SH 224 east of Westminster

Location
- Country: United States
- State: Colorado
- Counties: Adams

Highway system
- Colorado State Highway System; Interstate; US; State; Scenic
← SH 52	→ SH 55

State Highway 53 (SH 53) is a state highway in Adams County, Colorado, United States, north of Denver. SH 53's southern terminus is at Interstate 25 (I-25) and U.S. Route 87 (US 87) north of Denver, and the northern terminus is at SH 224 east of Westminster.

== Route description ==
SH 53 begins at the 58th Avenue interchange (exit 215) on I-25. After a short distance west on 58th Avenue, the route turns north on Broadway Street, crossing under Interstate 76 with no access and ending at 70th Avenue (SH 224).

== History ==
In 1971-1972, Colorado constructed an extension of Broadway Street from 66th Avenue north to SH 224, including a bridge over Clear Creek. Along with existing portions of Broadway Street and 58th Avenue, the new roadway was designated State Highway 53.

== Major intersections ==
The entire route is in Adams County.

Location	mi	km	Destinations	Notes
North Washington	0.000	0.000	I-25 / US 87	Southern terminus; I-25 exit 215
North Washington	0.238	0.383	Broadway Street / East 58th Avenue	SH 53 turns from East 58th Avenue onto Broadway Street
Twin Lakes	1.663	2.676	SH 224 (East 70th Avenue) to I-25 south / US 36 west	Northern terminus
1.000 mi = 1.609 km; 1.000 km = 0.621 mi
