= Thornton, Colorado =

Home rule city in Adams and Weld counties, Colorado, United States

- Home rule city
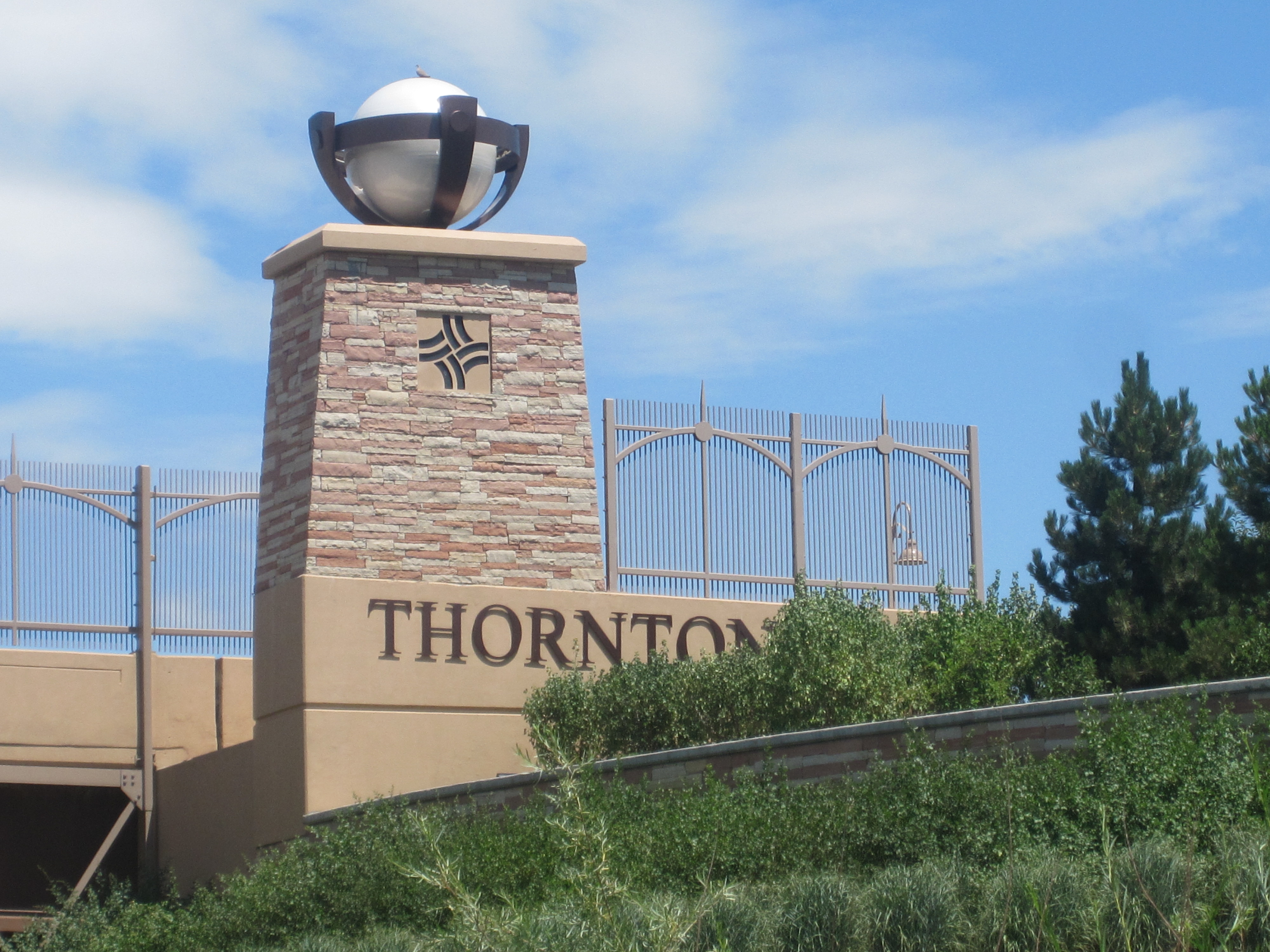
- Thornton welcome sign on Interstate 25

- Flag
- Interactive map of Thornton, Colorado
- Location within Colorado Location within the United States
- Coordinates: 39°55′02″N 104°57′40″W
- Country: United States
- State: Colorado
- Counties: Adams and Weld
- Incorporated: June 12, 1956
- Named for: Daniel I.J. Thornton

Government
  - Type: Home rule city

Area
  - Home rule city: 37.947 sq mi (98.282 km^{2})
  - Land: 35.924 sq mi (93.043 km^{2})
  - Water: 2.023 sq mi (5.239 km^{2})
- Elevation: 5,210 ft (1,590 m)

Population (2020)
  - Home rule city: 141,867
  - Rank: 6th in Colorado; 191st in the United States
  - Density: 3,949/sq mi (1,525/km^{2})
  - Metro: 2,963,821 (19th)
  - CSA: 3,623,560 (17th)
  - Front Range: 5,055,344
- Time zone: UTC−07:00 (MST)
  - Summer (DST): UTC−06:00 (MDT)
- ZIP code: Denver 80221, 80229, 80233, 80241, 80260; Brighton 80602
- Area codes: 303/720/983
- GNIS town ID: 2412064
- FIPS code: 08-77290
- Website: City of Thornton

Thornton is a home rule city in Adams and Weld counties, Colorado, United States. The city population was 141,867 at the 2020 census, an increase of 19.44% since the 2010 United States census, all of which resided in Adams County. Thornton is the sixth-most populous city in Colorado and the 191st-most populous city in the U.S. It is 10 miles (16 km) north of the Colorado State Capitol in Denver and is a part of both the Denver–Aurora–Greeley combined statistical area and the Front Range Urban Corridor.

== History ==
Prior to European colonization, the Thornton region served as the ancestral homeland of Native American tribes, including the Arapaho and Cheyenne peoples.

Thornton consisted solely of farmland until 1953, when Sam Hoffman purchased a lot off Washington Street about seven miles (11 km) north of Denver. The town he laid out was the first fully planned community in Adams County, and the first to offer full municipal services from a single tax levy, including recreation services and free trash pickup. Thornton was named in honor of then-incumbent Colorado Governor Dan Thornton.

The Thornton Community Association (TCA) was formed in 1954 to help guide the new community's development. By the end of 1955, Thornton had 5,500 residents in over 1,200 homes. The TCA was instrumental in Thornton's incorporation on June 12, 1956. Oyer G. Leary was elected the first mayor.

== Geography ==
At the 2020 United States census, the town had a total area of 24,286 acres (98.282 km^{2}) including 1,295 acres (5.239 km^{2}) of water.

== Demographics ==
Historical population
Census	Pop.	Note	%±
1960	11,353		—
1970	13,326		17.4%
1980	42,054		215.6%
1990	55,031		30.9%
2000	82,384		49.7%
2010	118,772		44.2%
2020	141,867		19.4%
2024 (est.)	146,689	▲	3.4%
U.S. Decennial Census

=== 2020 census ===
Thornton, Colorado – Racial and ethnic composition Note: the US Census treats Hispanic/Latino as an ethnic category. This table excludes Latinos from the racial categories and assigns them to a separate category. Hispanics/Latinos may be of any race.
Race / Ethnicity (NH = Non-Hispanic)	Pop 2000	Pop 2010	Pop 2020	% 2000	% 2010	% 2020
White alone (NH)	59,635	71,147	72,316	72.39%	59.90%	50.97%
Black or African American alone (NH)	1,106	1,903	2,660	1.34%	1.60%	1.87%
Native American or Alaska Native alone (NH)	560	566	748	0.68%	0.48%	0.53%
Asian alone (NH)	2,013	5,058	8,250	2.44%	4.26%	5.82%
Pacific Islander alone (NH)	64	97	130	0.08%	0.08%	0.09%
Some Other Race alone (NH)	78	184	658	0.09%	0.15%	0.46%
Mixed Race or Multi-Racial (NH)	1,345	2,215	5,713	1.63%	1.86%	4.03%
Hispanic or Latino (any race)	17,583	37,602	51,392	21.34%	31.66%	36.23%
Total	82,384	118,772	141,867	100.00%	100.00%	100.00%

As of the 2010 census, there were 118,772 people, 41,359 households, and 30,254 families living in the city. The population density was 3,409.1 inhabitants per square mile (1,316.3/km^{2}). There were 43,230 housing units at an average density of 1,240.8 per square mile (479.1/km^{2}). The racial makeup of the city was 77.4% White, 4.4% Asian, 1.8% African American, 1.1% American Indian, 0.1% Pacific Islander, 11.4% from other races, and 3.8% from two or more races. Hispanics and Latinos of any race were 31.7% of the population.

There were 41,359 households, out of which 43.9% had children under the age of 18 living with them, 54.7% were married couples living together, 6.2% had a male householder with no wife present, 12.2% had a female householder with no husband present, and 26.9% were non-families. 20.1% of all households were made up of individuals, and 4.2% had someone living alone who was 65 years of age or older. The average household size was 2.86, and the average family size was 3.32.

The distribution of the population by age was 29.5% under the age of 18, 9.1% from 18 to 24, 32.6% from 25 to 44, 22.3% from 45 to 64, and 6.5% who were 65 years of age or older. The median age was 32.0 years. The gender makeup of the city was 49.5% male and 50.5% female.

The median income for a household in the city was $65,578, and the median income for a family was $74,233. Males had a median income of $49,154 versus $39,596 for females. The city's per capita income was $26,100. About 7.8% of families and 9.9% of the population were below the poverty line, including 14.1% of those under age 18 and 7.4% of those age 65 or over.

== Recreation ==
Thornton has 81 city parks and nearly 2,000 acres (8.1 km^{2}) of parks and open space. There are over 80 miles (130 km) of trails throughout the city. Recreational facilities include the Margaret Carpenter Recreation Center and the Thornton Community Center. Golf courses include the Thorncreek Golf Course and Todd Creek Golf.

== Transportation ==
=== Highways ===
Six highways run through the city of Thornton:

- Interstate 25 passes through Thornton twice. First it enters from Sherrelwood and Welby to the south, then passing through Northglenn, before reentering Thornton. It then exits the city north into Broomfield.
- Interstate 76 briefly passes through the southeastern edge of Thornton.
- State Highway 7 (East 160th Avenue) runs along much of northern Thornton. It enters the city from Todd Creek to the east and exits to Broomfield to the west.
- State Highway 44 (East 104th Avenue) begins in Thornton and then heads east into Commerce City.
- State Highway 224 (East 74th Avenue) runs along Thornton's southern border for less than 1,000 feet (300 m).
- E-470 runs through northern Thornton in between Todd Creek to the east and Broomfield to the west.

=== Mass transit ===
The Regional Transportation District provides bus and commuter rail service to Thornton. Commuter rail service to the city began on September 21, 2020, on the N Line. There are three commuter rail stations within the city, Original Thornton/88th station, Thornton Crossroads/104th station, and Eastlake/124th station, which currently serves as the northern terminus of the N Line.

== Education ==
Thornton is served primarily by four school districts: Adams County School District 12, Adams County School District 14, Mapleton Public Schools, and Brighton School District 27J. These include: Eight high schools (Thornton High School and Horizon High School {Both Adams 12}, Riverdale Ridge High School {Brighton 27J}, and five of Mapleton's small-by-design high schools), eleven middle schools (Five in Adams 12, one in Brighton 27J, five in Mapleton) and twenty elementary schools (Twelve in Adams 12, two in Brighton 27J, and six in Mapleton).

There are also several charter schools in or near Thornton, including Stargate School, Colorado Virtual Academy, New America School, and Westgate Community Charter School.

Lord of Life Lutheran School is a Christian Pre-K–8 school of the Wisconsin Evangelical Lutheran Synod in Thornton.

Thornton has several libraries and is served by the Rangeview Library District, also known as Anythink Libraries.

== Retail ==
Thornton has several shopping areas, such as Larkridge Mall, Thornton Town Center, and Thorncreek Crossing Shopping Center. Larkridge is home to national anchor tenants, big box retailers and restaurants, and has a pedestrian village. DaveCo Liquor Store is the largest liquor store in the world.

== Notable people ==
Notable individuals who were born in or have lived in Thornton include:

- Tesho Akindele (born 1992), soccer forward
- Josh Bredl (born 1991), pro wrestler
- Yadira Caraveo (born 1986), former U.S. representative and Colorado state representative
- Edward Casso (born 1974), Colorado state legislator
- John Denney (born 1978), football long snapper
- Dalton Knecht (born 2001), forward for the Los Angeles Lakers
- Mike Manning (born 1987), actor
- Nikki Marshall (born 1988), soccer forward, defender
- Beth Martinez Humenik, Colorado state legislator
- Mike McCoy (1953–2016), football cornerback
- Adrian Mora (born 1978), welterweight boxer
- Joseph Salazar, Colorado state legislator
- Kyle Sleeth (born 1981), baseball starting pitcher
- Neal Ulevich (born 1946), photojournalist

== See also ==
- Denver-Aurora-Centennial, CO Metropolitan Statistical Area
- Greeley, CO Metropolitan Statistical Area
- Denver-Aurora-Greeley, CO Combined Statistical Area
- Front Range Urban Corridor
- List of municipalities in Colorado
- List of populated places in Colorado
- List of post offices in Colorado
