= Thornton Crossroads/104th station =

Commuter rail station in Thornton, Colorado

Thornton Crossroads•104th
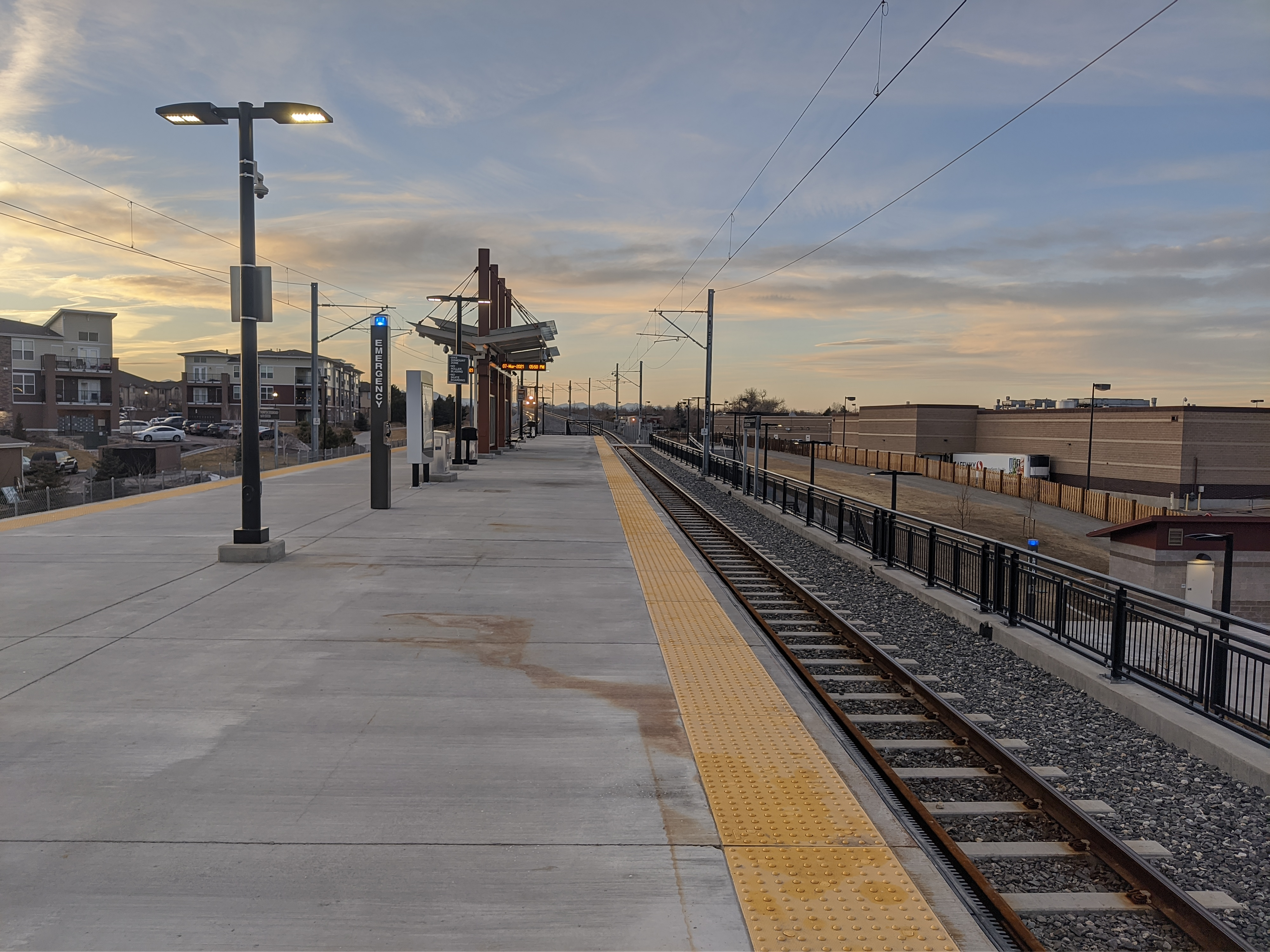
- Thornton Crossroads/104th station platform

General information
- Location: 10375 Colorado Boulevard; Thornton, Colorado
- Coordinates: 39.882139°N 104.942290°W
- Owner: Regional Transportation District
- Line: North Line
- Platforms: 1 island platform, 1 side platform
- Tracks: 2
- Connections: RTD Bus: 93L, 104L, Thornton FlexRide

Construction
- Structure type: At-grade
- Parking: 880 spaces
- Accessible: Yes

Other information
- Fare zone: Local

History
- Opened: September 21, 2020

Passengers
- 2025: 917 (average daily)
- Rank: 38 out of 75

Services
Preceding station	RTD	Following station
Northglenn/112th toward Eastlake/124th	N Line	Original Thornton/88th toward Union Station
Location

Thornton Crossroads/104th station (sometimes stylized as Thornton Crossroads•104th) is a Regional Transportation District (RTD) commuter rail station on the N Line in Thornton, Colorado. The station opened on September 21, 2020, along with the rest of the N Line.

== Station layout ==
1F

Platform Level

Colorado Boulevard; bus bays; parking garage
Side platform, northbound only; doors will open on the right
Northbound
← toward Eastlake/124th (Northglenn/112th)
Island platform, southbound only; doors will open on the left
Southbound
toward Union Station (Original Thornton/88th) →

Thornton Crossroads/104th station is located on Colorado Boulevard, slightly south of 104th Avenue. The station is double-tracked in order to allow northbound and southbound N Line trains to meet at this station, as the former Union Pacific right-of-way used by the N Line was not double-tracked as a part of its construction. The station features an 880-space park-and-ride garage, the largest on the N Line. Connections can be made to Denver International Airport via the 104L express bus.

The station has seen transit-oriented development since its opening, with multiple apartment complexes and single-family residential neighborhoods accessible to the station. A shopping center anchored by a Safeway adjoins the station to its north.
