= Commerce City/72nd station =

Commuter rail station in Commerce City, Colorado

Commerce City•72nd
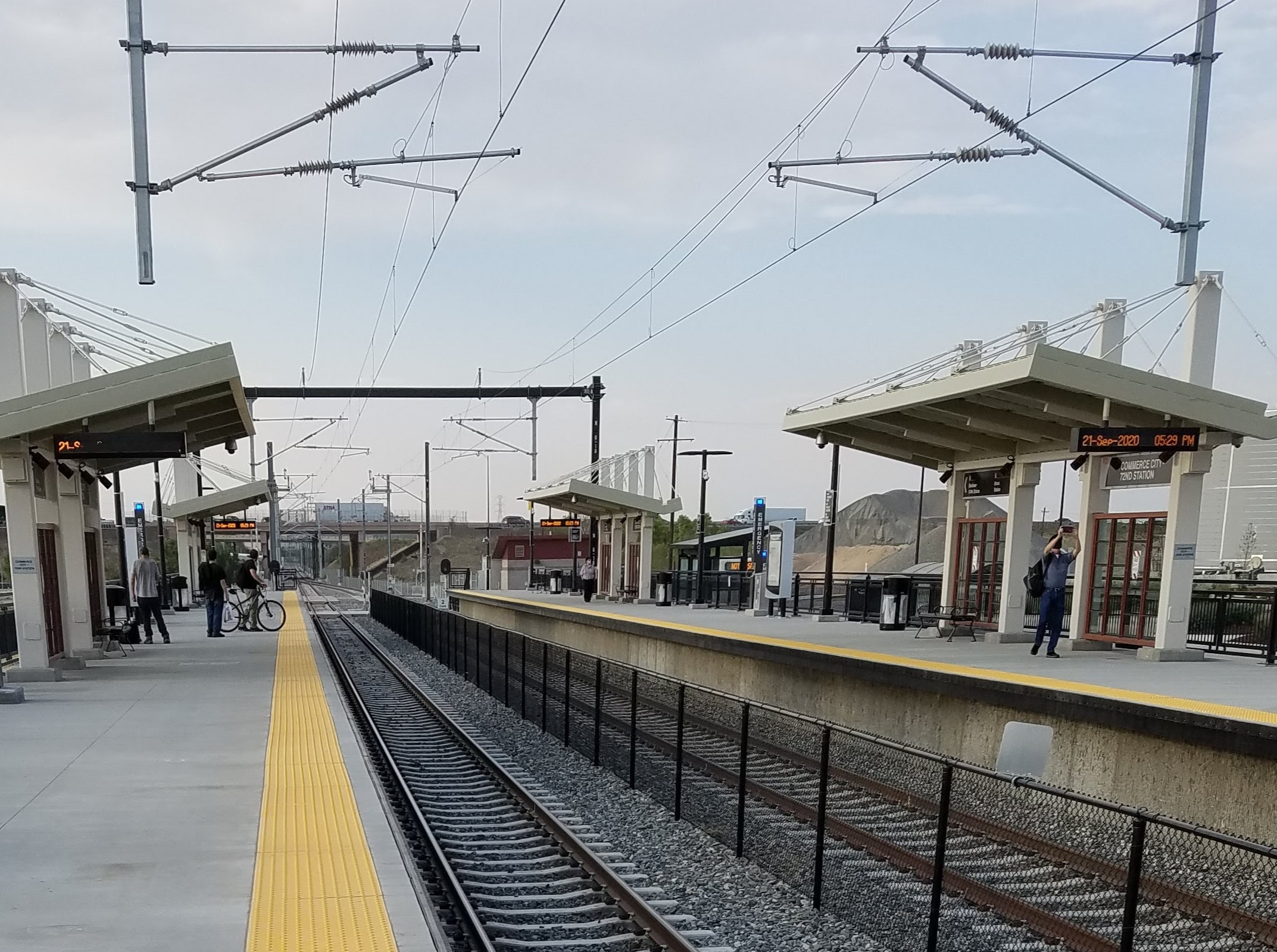
- Commerce City/72nd station platforms

General information
- Location: 3838 East 72nd Avenue; Commerce City, Colorado
- Coordinates: 39.826361°N 104.943057°W
- Owner: Regional Transportation District
- Line: North Line
- Platforms: 2 side platforms
- Tracks: 2
- Connections: RTD Bus: 49, 72, 88, 88L

Construction
- Structure type: At-grade
- Parking: 330 spaces
- Accessible: Yes

Other information
- Fare zone: Local

History
- Opened: September 21, 2020

Passengers
- 2025: 600 (average daily)
- Rank: 52 out of 75

Services
Preceding station	RTD	Following station
Original Thornton/88th toward Eastlake/124th	N Line	48th & Brighton/National Western Center toward Union Station
Location

Commerce City/72nd station (sometimes stylized as Commerce City•72nd) is a Regional Transportation District (RTD) commuter rail station on the N Line in Commerce City, Colorado. It is the only RTD rail station located within Commerce City. The station opened on September 21, 2020, along with the rest of the N Line.

== Station layout ==
1F

Platform Level

East 70th Avenue; bus bays; parking
Side platform, doors will open on the right
Northbound
← toward Eastlake/124th (Original Thornton/88th)
Southbound
toward Union Station (48th & Brighton/National Western Center) →
Side platform, doors will open on the right

The station is dual-tracked with two side platforms; however, the N Line reduces to a single track on both sides of the station. The Denver Skyway Bridge begins immediately to the south of the station. The single-track bridge runs nearly 2 miles to 48th & Brighton/National Western Center station on the other side, making it the longest bridge in Colorado. The N Line turns to follow a former Union Pacific right-of-way north of the station which was not double-tracked during the N Line's construction. With the exception of a short segment in Thornton, the N Line remains a single track from this station to its northern terminus at Eastlake-124th station.
