= Kyle Sleeth =

American baseball player (born 1981)

- Starting pitcher
- Born: December 20, 1981 (age 44); Thornton, Colorado, U.S.
- Bats: Right Throws: Right
- Stats at Baseball Reference

Kyle A. Sleeth (born December 20, 1981) is an American former starting pitcher in the Detroit Tigers organization. Once touted as one of Major League Baseball's top prospects, his career in the Tigers' minor league organization was marred by injuries and he progressed no higher than Double-A; nonetheless, he showed enough promise to be placed on the Tigers' 40-man roster.

== Career ==
Sleeth was drafted by the Baltimore Orioles in the 18th round (534th overall) in the 2000 Major League Baseball draft, but did not sign and instead attended Wake Forest. As a freshman in 2001, he went 10–3 with a 5.08 ERA and 56 strikeouts in 78.2 innings pitched to lead the nationally ranked Demon Deacons in wins. After the 2001 season, he played collegiate summer baseball for the Cotuit Kettleers of the Cape Cod Baseball League and was named a league all-star. In 2002, Sleeth went undefeated with a 14–0 record with a 2.97 ERA and 113 strikeouts in 118.1 innings pitched. He led the Atlantic Coast Conference in wins, was second in the conference in strikeouts, and third in ERA. Baseball America named Sleeth the top pitching prospect in college baseball that year.

In 2003, Sleeth returned for another year, going 7–3 with a 2.81 ERA and 102 strikeouts. He earned a spot on the All-Conference first team. On March 28, 2003, Sleeth tied the NCAA record for consecutive victories against Duke with his 26th straight win. He lost the bid to break the record losing against Florida State University on April 4, 2003. The 26 consecutive wins left him tied with former Brigham Young University pitcher Scott Nielsen, who established the mark in the 1978 and 1982-1983 seasons. USA Baseball named Sleeth a finalist for the Golden Spikes Award, given to the top amateur baseball player in the country. In 2019 Sleeth was inducted into the Wake Forest Sports Hall of Fame for his accomplishments as a Demon Deacon.

Sleeth would become the 3rd overall pick in the 1st round in the 2003 Major League Baseball draft for the Detroit Tigers. He did not sign his professional contract until August, delaying his professional debut until the following year.

He missed the 2005 and part of the 2006 season when he underwent Tommy John surgery on June 9. He announced his retirement March 28, 2008.
