= DaveCo Liquor Store =

Liquor store in Thornton, Colorado, United States

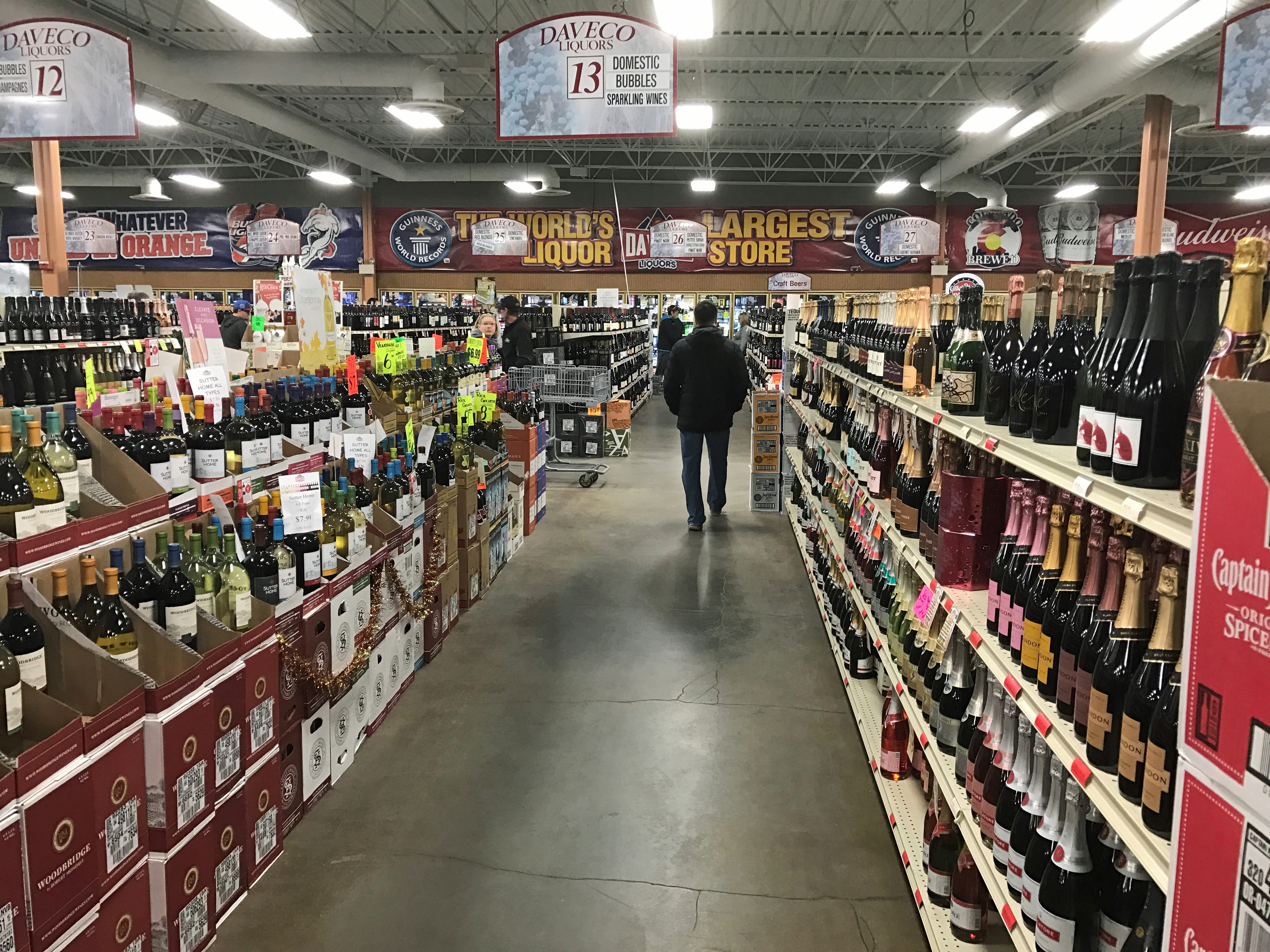
DaveCo Liquors in 2016

DaveCo is a liquor store in Thornton, Colorado, United States that has been named by the Guinness Book of World Records as the largest liquor store in the world.

DaveCo became the subject of news coverage when the Colorado state government threatened to shut it down due to violations of state liquor laws in early 2010.

The owner, Hani D. "Henry" Sawaged, pleaded guilty to a felony racketeering charge and will never be allowed to run a liquor store in Colorado again. He was sentenced to two years' probation and ordered to pay $1.31 million in restitution. His brothers, Ghassan D. Sawaged and Bassam D. Sawaged, pleaded guilty to theft and failure to file a tax return. They served a one-year deferred sentence and were ordered to jointly pay $200,000 in restitution. Other charges against Hani Sawaged—including theft, computer crime and tax evasion—were dropped in exchange for his guilty plea to the most serious charge.
