= N Line (RTD) =

Commuter rail line in the Denver metropolitan area

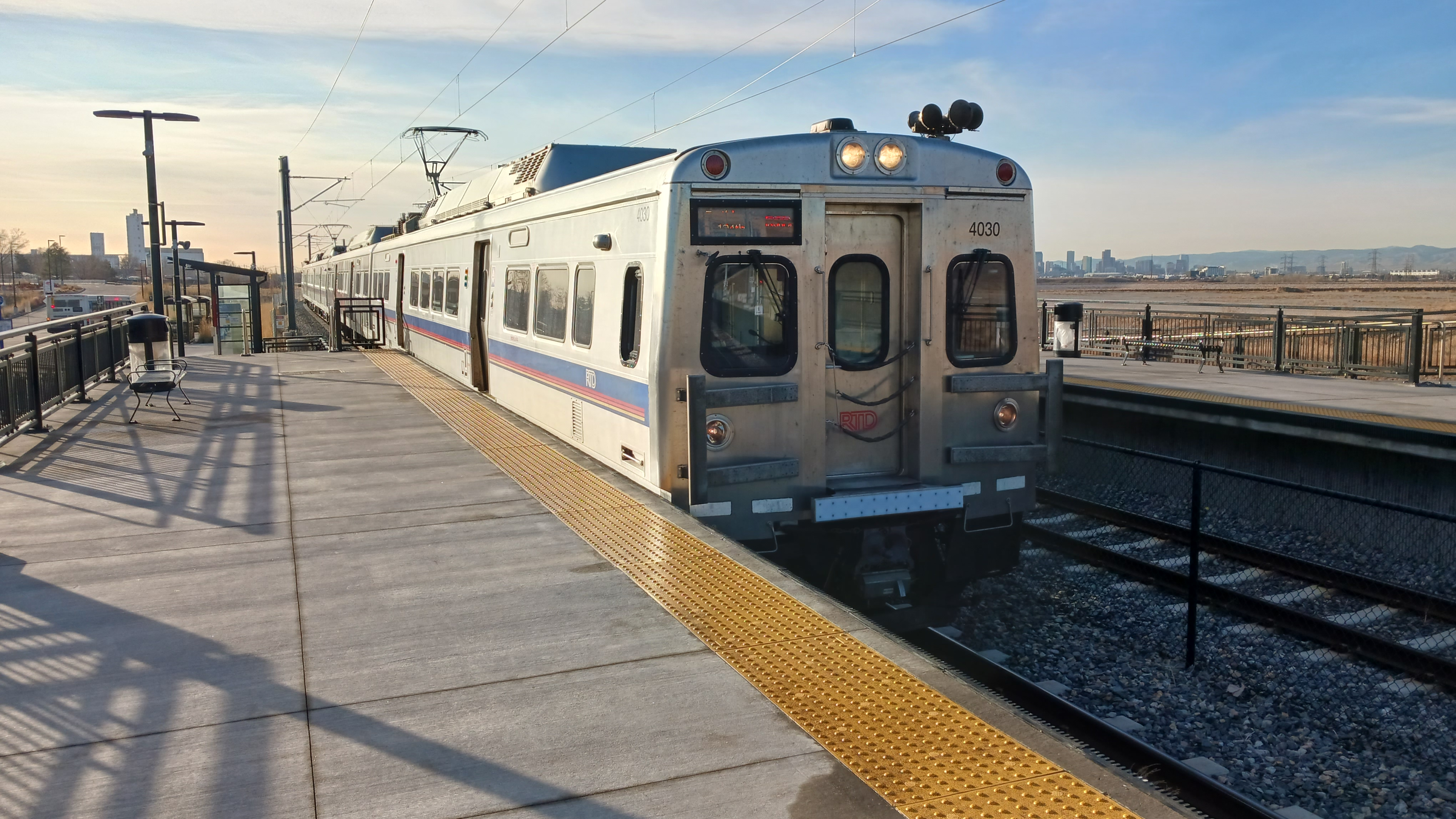
- Northbound N Line train at Commerce City/72nd station

Overview
- Other name: North Line
- Owner: Regional Transportation District
- Locale: Denver metropolitan area
- Termini: Union Station; Eastlake/124th
- Stations: 7
- Website: Metro North Rail Line

Service
- Type: Commuter rail
- System: RTD Rail
- Operator: Regional Transportation District
- Ridership: 1,153,000 (FY2023, annual)

History
- Opened: September 21, 2020; 5 years ago

Technical
- Line length: 13 mi (21 km)
- Track gauge: 4 ft 8 1/2 in (1,435 mm) standard gauge
- Electrification: Overhead line, 25 kV 60 Hz AC
- Operating speed: 79 mph (127 km/h) (top)
Route map
N Line highlighted in purple

The N Line is a Regional Transportation District (RTD) commuter rail line that serves stations in Denver, Commerce City, Northglenn, and Thornton, Colorado. The N Line opened on September 21, 2020, and is owned and operated by RTD. It was also known as the North Line during planning and construction. It is colored purple on system maps.

The N Line's southern terminus is at Union Station in downtown Denver, and its northern terminus is at 124th Avenue in the Eastlake neighborhood of Thornton. It was the final line funded under the FasTracks expansion plan to begin service.

== Route ==
The N Line departs Union Station on Track 2, turning north immediately after passing Coors Field and navigating onto a BNSF right-of-way paralleling the South Platte River. The 48th & Brighton/National Western Center station is the line's only other station in Denver, and provides access to the Denver Coliseum, National Western Stock Show complex, and other points in Denver's Elyria-Swansea neighborhood. After leaving the station, the line becomes elevated onto the Denver Skyway Bridge. The single track bridge carries the N Line parallel to the South Platte River and over Interstate 270, a Suncor refinery, and a BNSF yard. At nearly two miles long, it is the longest bridge in the state of Colorado. The bridge ends just south of Commerce City/72nd station. Upon leaving the station, the N Line again narrows to a single track as it departs from the South Platte River and crosses under Interstate 76. It remains a single track as it enters Thornton on a former Union Pacific right-of-way, and crosses into primarily single-family residential development. The line regains a second track south of Thornton Crossroads/104th station, before reverting back to a single track as it briefly enters Northglenn. The N Line remains a single track to its current terminus at Eastlake/124th station, where trains return to Union Station from one of two stub tracks. The rail right-of-way - currently disused north of 124th Avenue - and a bicycle path continue north from the station into Weld County.

== History ==
Studies for a rail line connecting Denver to its northern suburbs had existed since the opening of the light rail Central Corridor in 1994. In 2004, voters approved the North Line as part of the FasTracks expansion plan. The line's Environmental Impact Statement (EIS) started in 2006 and was completed in late 2010. It received final approval by the Federal Transit Administration (FTA) in April 2011. The contract to build the North Line was awarded to Graham, Balfour Beatty, and Hamon, doing business as Regional Rail Partners (RRP), in November 2013.

A pre-existing Union Pacific right-of-way was purchased by RTD in 2009, and groundbreaking occurred on March 20, 2014. The project initially had an expected completion date of August 2018; by that time, construction on the line was 85% complete but its opening had been delayed to 2019. It was later delayed again to 2020. Despite additional slowdowns in construction caused by the COVID-19 pandemic, service on the line began on September 21, 2020, roughly two years behind schedule.

RTD's three other commuter rail lines - the A, B, and G Lines - are operated by Denver Transit Partners for RTD via the Eagle P3 public-private partnership. The N Line is the only commuter rail line that is directly operated by RTD.

=== Rolling stock ===
The N Line uses Hyundai Rotem Silverliner V railcars, originally designed and built for the Southeastern Pennsylvania Transportation Authority (SEPTA). RTD is the only agency that operates these vehicles outside of the Philadelphia metropolitan area.

=== Planned extension to Weld County ===
FasTracks provisions for the N Line's northern terminus to be located near East 160th Avenue (State Highway 7) in northern Thornton, along the Adams/Weld county line. An intermediate station would be constructed at 144th Avenue in Thornton, with both stations being located at those roads' junctions with the Union Pacific right-of-way. This extension would be 5.5 miles long. As of 2026, construction on the line has not yet been started due to a lack of funding. The initial GBBH contract included an option to build the line to 162nd Avenue once funding becomes available.

In August 2026, Adams County and the RTD Board of Directors allocated $12 million towards environmental review and preliminary design work for the extension to East 160th Avenue. Funding for the remainder of the project has not yet been obtained, though RTD and Adams County officials continue to prioritize the completion of the N Line as provisioned in FasTracks.

=== Possible extension to Longmont ===
RTD commissioned the Northwest Area Mobility Study (NAMS) in 2014 to review mobility and transit corridors in Denver's northwest suburbs. It investigated a possible extension of the N Line from East 160th Avenue, along a new right-of-way through southwestern Weld County and northeastern Boulder County, to a new northern terminus in Longmont. This extension would serve to either complement or replace the proposed B Line extension, with an estimated travel time of one hour between Longmont and Union Station. The study concluded that ridership along the corridor would not be sufficient for service, and that the proposed B Line route via Boulder is preferred. However, the study left the door open for a potential re-evaluation of this extension based on continued development in Thornton and Weld County.

== Stations ==
Station	Municipality	Opened	Major connections & notes
North Thornton/Hwy 7	Thornton	—N/a	
York/144th	Thornton	—N/a	
Eastlake/124th	Thornton	September 21, 2020	Park and ride: 410 spaces
Northglenn/112th	Northglenn	September 21, 2020	Park and ride: 310 spaces
Thornton Crossroads/104th	Thornton	September 21, 2020	Park and ride: 880 spaces
Original Thornton/88th	Thornton	September 21, 2020	Park and ride: 550 spaces
Commerce City/72nd	Commerce City	September 21, 2020	Park and ride: 330 spaces
48th & Brighton/National Western Center	Denver	September 21, 2020	
Union Station	Denver	April 22, 2016	Amtrak: California Zephyr; 16th Street FreeRide
