= Ronald Reagan Highway =

The Ronald Reagan Highway or Ronald Reagan Memorial Highway may refer to the following roads named after U.S. President Ronald Reagan:

== Ronald Reagan Highway ==
- U.S. Route 14 in Illinois
- Interstate 25 in Colorado in El Paso County
- Interstate 275 (Ohio–Indiana–Kentucky) in Kentucky

== Ronald Reagan Memorial Highway ==
- Interstate 65 in Alabama between Birmingham and Decatur
- Interstate 20 in Texas, near Arlington, Texas
- U.S. Route 190 in Louisiana
- Portion of Highway 290 in Texas, near Houston, Texas

== Other highways named after Ronald Reagan ==
- Ronald Reagan Memorial Tollway, the tolled portion of Interstate 88 in Illinois
- Ronald Reagan Cross County Highway in Cincinnati, Ohio, a portion of Ohio State Route 126
- Interstate 469 in Indiana, also known as the Ronald Reagan Expressway
- California State Route 118, also known as the Ronald Reagan Freeway
- Florida's Turnpike, also known as the Ronald Reagan Turnpike
- Ronald Reagan Parkway in Gwinnett County, Georgia
- Ronald Reagan Trail in Illinois
