= Northglenn, Colorado =

City in Colorado, United States

- Home rule municipality
- City of Northglenn
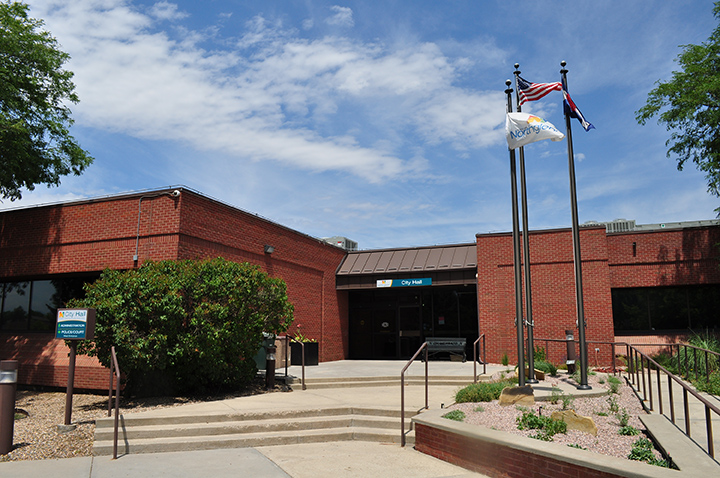
- The Northglenn City Hall.

- Flag

- Location of the City of Northglenn in Adams and Weld counties, Colorado
- Coordinates: 39°53′26″N 104°58′45″W
- Country: United States
- State: Colorado
- Counties: Adams County; Weld County
- City: Northglenn
- Incorporated: April 19, 1969

Government
  - Type: Home rule municipality

Area
  - Total: 7.44 sq mi (19.28 km^{2})
  - Land: 7.35 sq mi (19.04 km^{2})
  - Water: 0.093 sq mi (0.24 km^{2})
- Elevation: 5,364 ft (1,635 m)

Population (2020)
  - Total: 38,131
  - Density: 5,187/sq mi (2,003/km^{2})
- Time zone: UTC−7 (MST)
  - Summer (DST): UTC−6 (MDT)
- ZIP codes: 80233, 80234, 80241, 80260
- Area codes: Both 303 and 720
- FIPS code: 08-54330
- GNIS feature ID: 2411280
- Highways: I-25, SH 7, SH 128, E-470
- Website: www.northglenn.org

The City of Northglenn is a home rule municipality located in Adams and Weld counties, Colorado, United States. Northglenn is a part of the Denver–Aurora–Lakewood, CO Metropolitan Statistical Area. As of the 2020 census the city's population was 38,131. It was built as a master planned community in 1959 by Jordon Perlmutter.

The city is directly connected to Downtown Denver via the Regional Transportation District N Line at the Northglenn/112th station.

== Geography ==
Northglenn is located at 39°53′51″N 104°58′55″W (39.897418, -104.981891).

According to the United States Census Bureau, the city has a total area of 7.5 square miles (19.4 km^{2}), of which 7.4 square miles (19.2 km^{2}) is land and 0.077 square miles (0.2 km^{2}), or 1.23%, is water.

=== Climate ===
According to the Köppen Climate Classification system, Northglenn has a semi-arid climate BSK. The hottest temperature recorded in Northglenn was 108 °F (42 °C) on August 2, 2008, while the coldest temperature recorded was −24 °F (−31 °C) on December 22, 1990.

Climate data for Northglenn, Colorado, 1991–2020 normals, extremes 1984–present
Month	Jan	Feb	Mar	Apr	May	Jun	Jul	Aug	Sep	Oct	Nov	Dec	Year
Record high °F (°C)	77 (25)	83 (28)	85 (29)	90 (32)	101 (38)	105 (41)	108 (42)	110 (43)	102 (39)	92 (33)	84 (29)	77 (25)	110 (43)
Mean maximum °F (°C)	68.1 (20.1)	69.4 (20.8)	77.0 (25.0)	82.8 (28.2)	90.3 (32.4)	97.9 (36.6)	101.0 (38.3)	98.6 (37.0)	94.1 (34.5)	86.1 (30.1)	75.4 (24.1)	67.9 (19.9)	102.0 (38.9)
Mean daily maximum °F (°C)	48.0 (8.9)	49.6 (9.8)	57.7 (14.3)	63.9 (17.7)	72.3 (22.4)	85.3 (29.6)	91.1 (32.8)	88.9 (31.6)	81.5 (27.5)	67.2 (19.6)	55.8 (13.2)	47.5 (8.6)	67.4 (19.7)
Daily mean °F (°C)	33.5 (0.8)	34.9 (1.6)	43.0 (6.1)	49.5 (9.7)	58.4 (14.7)	69.4 (20.8)	75.0 (23.9)	73.1 (22.8)	65.2 (18.4)	52.0 (11.1)	41.3 (5.2)	33.3 (0.7)	52.4 (11.3)
Mean daily minimum °F (°C)	19.0 (−7.2)	20.3 (−6.5)	28.4 (−2.0)	35.1 (1.7)	44.4 (6.9)	53.4 (11.9)	58.9 (14.9)	57.2 (14.0)	48.9 (9.4)	36.8 (2.7)	26.8 (−2.9)	19.1 (−7.2)	37.4 (3.0)
Mean minimum °F (°C)	−0.3 (−17.9)	1.7 (−16.8)	12.1 (−11.1)	21.3 (−5.9)	31.0 (−0.6)	43.2 (6.2)	51.4 (10.8)	49.2 (9.6)	35.8 (2.1)	21.6 (−5.8)	9.9 (−12.3)	0.1 (−17.7)	−6.9 (−21.6)
Record low °F (°C)	−15 (−26)	−17 (−27)	−5 (−21)	6 (−14)	20 (−7)	34 (1)	43 (6)	41 (5)	18 (−8)	4 (−16)	−6 (−21)	−24 (−31)	−24 (−31)
Average precipitation inches (mm)	0.45 (11)	0.54 (14)	1.21 (31)	1.94 (49)	2.35 (60)	1.50 (38)	1.73 (44)	1.32 (34)	1.19 (30)	1.07 (27)	0.73 (19)	0.48 (12)	14.51 (369)
Average snowfall inches (cm)	6.0 (15)	7.6 (19)	8.2 (21)	6.5 (17)	1.2 (3.0)	0.0 (0.0)	0.0 (0.0)	.00 (0.00)	0.1 (0.25)	2.4 (6.1)	6.9 (18)	5.9 (15)	44.8 (114.35)
Average precipitation days (≥ 0.01 in)	3.9	4.5	5.5	7.9	10.0	6.9	7.4	7.6	5.7	5.4	4.5	3.8	73.1
Average snowy days (≥ 0.1 in)	3.8	4.2	3.6	2.9	0.6	0.0	0.0	0.0	0.2	1.1	3.2	4.0	23.6
Source 1: NOAA
Source 2: National Weather Service

== Demographics ==
Historical population
Census	Pop.	Note	%±
1970	27,785		—
1980	29,847		7.4%
1990	27,195		−8.9%
2000	31,575		16.1%
2010	35,789		13.3%
2020	38,131		6.5%
2024 (est.)	38,287	▲	0.4%
U.S. Decennial Census

At the 2000 census there were 31,575 people, 11,610 households, and 8,208 families living in the city. The population density was 4,256.2 inhabitants per square mile (1,643.3/km^{2}). There were 12,051 housing units at an average density of 1,624.4 units per square mile (627.2 units/km^{2}). The racial makeup of the city was 83.04% White, 1.52% African American, 1.14% Native American, 3.07% Asian, 0.15% Pacific Islander, 8.13% from other races, and 2.94% from two or more races. Hispanic or Latino people of any race were 20.27%.

Of the 11,610 households 33.8% had children under the age of 18 living with them, 53.6% were married couples living together, 11.8% had a female householder with no husband present, and 29.3% were non-families. 23.0% of households were one person and 5.5% were one person aged 65 or older. The average household size was 2.71 and the average family size was 3.19.

The age distribution was 26.7% under the age of 18, 9.9% from 18 to 24, 32.9% from 25 to 44, 20.3% from 45 to 64, and 10.2% 65 or older. The median age was 33 years. For every 100 females, there were 100.1 males. For every 100 females age 18 and over, there were 98.7 males.

The median household income was $48,276 and the median family income was $52,888. Males had a median income of $36,214 versus $28,231 for females. The per capita income for the city was $20,253. About 3.8% of families and 5.4% of the population were below the poverty line, including 6.3% of those under age 18 and 4.7% of those age 65 or over.

=== 2020 census ===
As of the 2020 census, Northglenn had a population of 38,131. The median age was 34.5 years. 23.0% of residents were under the age of 18 and 12.6% of residents were 65 years of age or older. For every 100 females there were 100.8 males, and for every 100 females age 18 and over there were 100.1 males age 18 and over.

99.9% of residents lived in urban areas, while 0.1% lived in rural areas.

There were 13,954 households in Northglenn, of which 34.2% had children under the age of 18 living in them. Of all households, 41.7% were married-couple households, 22.5% were households with a male householder and no spouse or partner present, and 26.2% were households with a female householder and no spouse or partner present. About 24.5% of all households were made up of individuals and 8.4% had someone living alone who was 65 years of age or older.

There were 14,607 housing units, of which 4.5% were vacant. The homeowner vacancy rate was 0.8% and the rental vacancy rate was 7.3%.

Racial composition as of the 2020 census
Race	Number	Percent
White	23,649	62.0%
Black or African American	861	2.3%
American Indian and Alaska Native	830	2.2%
Asian	1,531	4.0%
Native Hawaiian and Other Pacific Islander	58	0.2%
Some other race	4,568	12.0%
Two or more races	6,634	17.4%
Hispanic or Latino (of any race)	14,022	36.8%

== Notable people ==
Notable individuals who were born in or have lived in Northglenn include:

- Odell Barry (1941–2022), football wide receiver, mayor of Northglenn
- Steve Taylor (1957- ), guitarist, singer-songwriter, producer
- Brian Turk (1970–2019), actor

== See also ==
- List of statistical areas in Colorado
  - Front Range Urban Corridor
  - North Central Colorado Urban Area
  - Denver-Aurora-Boulder, CO Combined Statistical Area
  - Denver-Aurora-Broomfield, CO Metropolitan Statistical Area
  - Greeley, CO Metropolitan Statistical Area
