= Eastlake/124th station =

Commuter rail station in Thornton, Colorado

Eastlake•124th
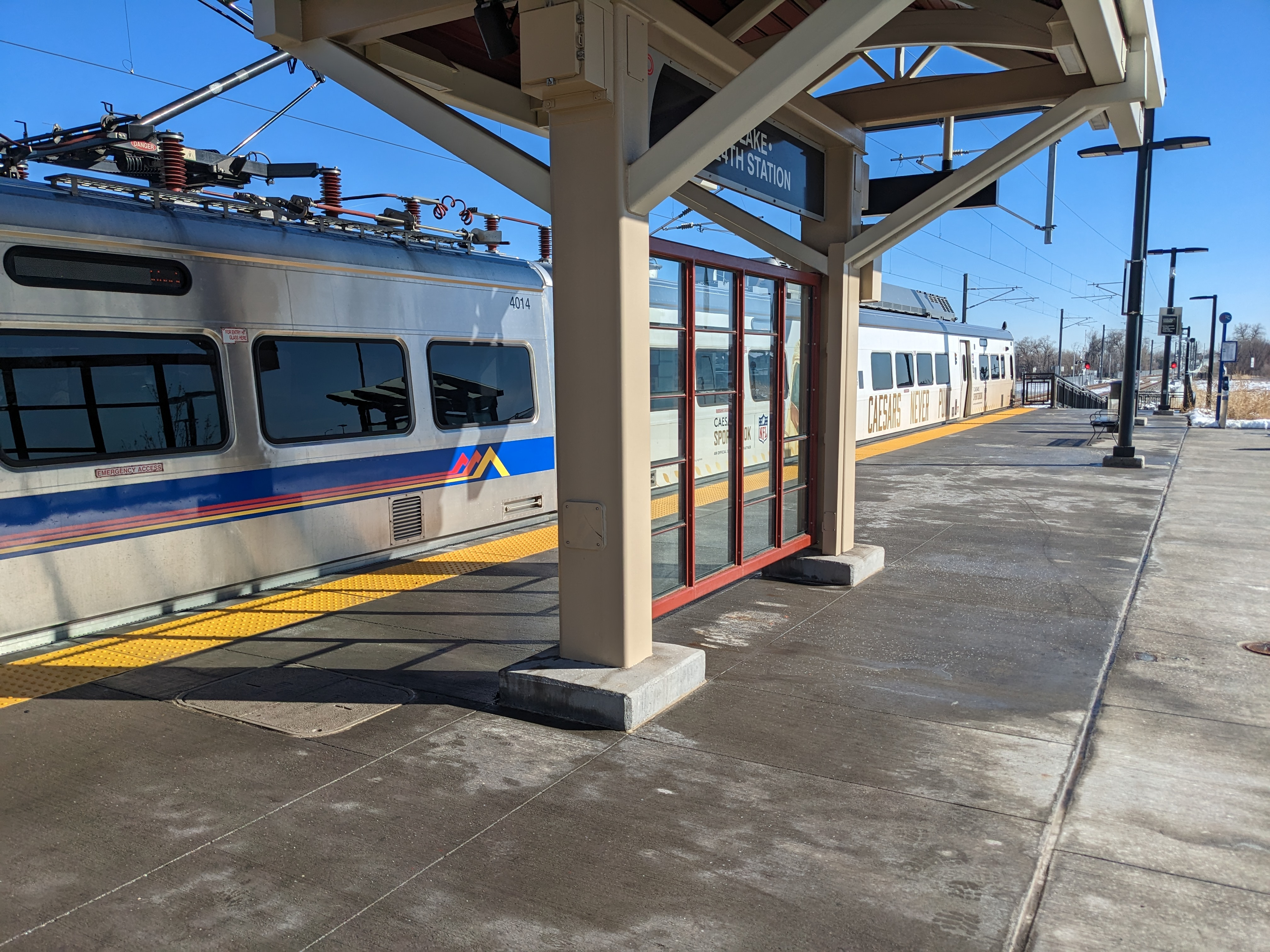
- A train at Eastlake/124th in February 2023

General information
- Location: 12500 Claude Court; Thornton, Colorado
- Coordinates: 39.922926°N 104.962155°W
- Owner: Regional Transportation District
- Line: North Line
- Platforms: 2 side platforms
- Tracks: 2
- Connections: RTD Bus: 120, 120L, Thornton FlexRide

Construction
- Structure type: At-grade
- Parking: 410 spaces
- Accessible: Yes

Other information
- Fare zone: Local

History
- Opened: September 21, 2020

Passengers
- 2025: 1,599 (average daily)
- Rank: 22 out of 75

Services
Preceding station	RTD	Following station
Terminus	N Line	Northglenn/112th toward Union Station
Location

Eastlake/124th station (sometimes stylized as Eastlake•124th) is a Regional Transportation District (RTD) commuter rail station on the N Line in Thornton, Colorado. The station opened on September 21, 2020, along with the rest of the N Line.

Eastlake/124th is the current northern terminus of the N Line. FasTracks provisions for the line's extension to East 160th Avenue, around 5 miles north. As of 2026, there is no estimated completion date for the extension.

== Station layout ==
1F

Platform Level

First Street
Side platform, doors will open on the right
Southbound
toward Union Station (Northglenn/112th) →
Southbound
toward Union Station (Northglenn/112th) →
Side platform, doors will open on the left
Claude Court; bus bays; parking

Eastlake/124th station is located adjacent to the Eastlake neighborhood of Thornton. As a terminal station, it features a large park-and-ride lot for commuters, and with an average of nearly 1,600 passengers per day it is the second-busiest station on the N Line (after Union Station). Northbound N Line trains terminate on one of two tracks, from which they return to Union Station. These tracks extend past the end of the station to allow for terminating trains to lay over, and the overhead catenary system (OCS) was installed such that the line's eventual extension would not require the relocation of any equipment.

The N Line was constructed along a former Union Pacific right-of-way. This right-of-way extends far north of the station, into Weld County, and eventually terminates in Frederick. The track north of Eastlake/124th is currently disused, although a bicycle trail was constructed along it. The right-of-way narrows to a single track immediately south of the station as it was not double-tracked during the N Line's construction. With the exception of a short segment further south in Thornton, N Line trains departing from Eastlake/124th remain on a single track to Commerce City/72nd station.
