= Welby, Colorado =

Census-designated place in Adams County, CO, USA

- Census-designated place
- Location of the Welby CDP in Adams County, Colorado.
- Coordinates: 39°50′25″N 104°57′56″W
- Country: United States
- State: Colorado
- County: Adams County

Government
  - Type: unincorporated community

Area
  - Total: 3.800 sq mi (9.841 km^{2})
  - Land: 3.705 sq mi (9.597 km^{2})
  - Water: 0.094 sq mi (0.244 km^{2})
- Elevation: 5,174 ft (1,577 m)

Population (2020)
  - Total: 15,553
  - Density: 4,197/sq mi (1,621/km^{2})
- Time zone: UTC-7 (MST)
  - Summer (DST): UTC-6 (MDT)
- ZIP Code: Denver 80229
- Area codes: 303 & 720
- GNIS feature: 2409539

Welby is an unincorporated community and a census-designated place (CDP) located in and governed by Adams County, Colorado, United States. The CDP is a part of the Denver–Aurora–Lakewood, CO Metropolitan Statistical Area. The population of the Welby CDP was 15,553 at the 2020 United States census.

== History ==
The community was named after one General Arthur Thomas Earle Welby, a railroad official.

== Geography ==
The Welby CDP has an area of 2,432 acres (9.841 km^{2}), including 60 acres (0.244 km^{2}) of water.

== Demographics ==
The United States Census Bureau initially defined the Welby CDP for the 1970 United States census.

Welby CDP, Colorado
Year	Pop.	±%
1970	6,875	—
1980	9,668	+40.6%
1990	10,218	+5.7%
2000	12,973	+27.0%
2010	14,846	+14.4%
2020	15,553	+4.8%
Source: United States Census Bureau

=== 2020 census ===
As of the 2020 census, Welby had a population of 15,553. The median age was 33.1 years. 25.8% of residents were under the age of 18 and 9.7% of residents were 65 years of age or older. For every 100 females, there were 104.6 males, and for every 100 females age 18 and over there were 103.0 males age 18 and over.

100.0% of residents lived in urban areas, while 0.0% lived in rural areas.

There were 5,220 households in Welby, of which 37.8% had children under the age of 18 living in them. Of all households, 42.4% were married-couple households, 21.9% were households with a male householder and no spouse or partner present, and 27.5% were households with a female householder and no spouse or partner present. About 22.1% of all households were made up of individuals and 7.3% had someone living alone who was 65 years of age or older.

There were 5,414 housing units, of which 3.6% were vacant. The homeowner vacancy rate was 0.7% and the rental vacancy rate was 5.4%.

Racial composition as of the 2020 census
Race	Number	Percent
White	7,160	46.0%
Black or African American	350	2.3%
American Indian and Alaska Native	410	2.6%
Asian	312	2.0%
Native Hawaiian and Other Pacific Islander	20	0.1%
Some other race	4,071	26.2%
Two or more races	3,230	20.8%
Hispanic or Latino (of any race)	9,240	59.4%

== See also ==
- Front Range Urban Corridor
