= Sherrelwood, Colorado =

Unincorporated community in Adams County, CO, USA

- Unincorporated Community; Census-designated place
- Location of the Sherrelwood CDP in Adams County, Colorado
- Coordinates: 39°50′18″N 104°59′52″W
- Country: United States
- State: Colorado
- County: Adams

Government
  - Type: unincorporated community

Area
  - Total: 2.454 sq mi (6.356 km^{2})
  - Land: 2.453 sq mi (6.353 km^{2})
  - Water: 0.010 sq mi (0.027 km^{2})
- Elevation: 5,292 ft (1,613 m)

Population (2020)
  - Total: 19,228
  - Density: 7,880/sq mi (3,042.6/km^{2})
- Time zone: UTC–7 (Mountain (MST))
  - Summer (DST): UTC–6 (MDT)
- ZIP Code: 80221
- Area codes: 303 and 720
- FIPS code: 08-69810
- GNIS feature ID: 2408726

Sherrelwood is an unincorporated community and a census-designated place (CDP) located in and governed by Adams County, Colorado, United States. The CDP is a part of the Denver–Aurora–Lakewood, CO Metropolitan Statistical Area. The population was 19,228 at the 2020 census.

== Geography ==
According to the United States Census Bureau, the CDP has a total area of 2.454 square miles (6.36 km^{2}), of which 2.453 square miles (6.35 km^{2}) are land and 0.010 square miles (0.026 km^{2}), is water.

== Demographics ==
The United States Census Bureau initially defined the Sherrelwood CDP for the 1970 United States census.

Historical population
Census	Pop.	Note	%±
1970	18,868		—
1980	17,629		−6.6%
1990	16,636		−5.6%
2000	17,657		6.1%
2010	18,287		3.6%
2020	19,228		5.1%
U.S. Decennial Census; 2020 Census

=== 2020 census ===
As of the 2020 census, Sherrelwood had a population of 19,228 living in 6,147 households and 4,395 families; the population density was 7,880.3 inhabitants per square mile (3,042.6/km^{2}).

The median age was 33.8 years. 25.2% of residents were under the age of 18 and 11.9% of residents were 65 years of age or older. For every 100 females there were 104.9 males, and for every 100 females age 18 and over there were 106.7 males age 18 and over.

100.0% of residents lived in urban areas, while 0.0% lived in rural areas.

Households included 38.5% with children under the age of 18 living in them. Of all households, 42.7% were married-couple households, 23.9% were households with a male householder and no spouse or partner present, and 25.8% were households with a female householder and no spouse or partner present. About 19.7% of all households were made up of individuals and 6.9% had someone living alone who was 65 years of age or older.

There were 6,324 housing units, of which 2.8% were vacant. The homeowner vacancy rate was 0.4% and the rental vacancy rate was 4.6%.

Racial composition as of the 2020 census
Race	Number	Percent
White	8,554	44.5%
Black or African American	299	1.6%
American Indian and Alaska Native	456	2.4%
Asian	491	2.6%
Native Hawaiian and Other Pacific Islander	40	0.2%
Some other race	5,286	27.5%
Two or more races	4,102	21.3%
Hispanic or Latino (of any race)	11,877	61.8%

=== 2010 census ===
As of the 2010 census, there were 18,287 people, 5,898 households, and 4,328 families residing in the CDP. The population density was 7,530.0 inhabitants per square mile (2,907.3/km^{2}). There were 6,240 housing units.

=== 2000 census ===
As of the 2000 census, there were 17,657 people, 6,082 households, and 4,452 families residing in the CDP. The population density was 7,222.5 inhabitants per square mile (2,788.6/km^{2}). There were 6,163 housing units at an average density of 2,520.9 per square mile (973.3/km^{2}). The racial makeup of the CDP was 72.01% White, 1.21% African American, 1.18% Native American, 3.38% Asian, 0.19% Pacific Islander, 18.03% from other races, and 4.00% from two or more races. Hispanic or Latino of any race were 39.83% of the population.

There were 6,082 households, out of which 35.3% had children under the age of 18 living with them, 52.8% were married couples living together, 13.9% had a female householder with no husband present, and 26.8% were non-families. 18.7% of all households were made up of individuals, and 4.8% had someone living alone who was 65 years of age or older. The average household size was 2.90 and the average family size was 3.31.

In the CDP, the population was spread out, with 27.4% under the age of 18, 12.5% from 18 to 24, 31.2% from 25 to 44, 19.3% from 45 to 64, and 9.6% who were 65 years of age or older. The median age was 31 years. For every 100 females, there were 102.7 males. For every 100 females age 18 and over, there were 102.6 males.

The median income for a household in the CDP was $42,722, and the median income for a family was $45,734. Males had a median income of $31,833 versus $26,853 for females. The per capita income for the CDP was $17,036. About 5.9% of families and 8.3% of the population were below the poverty line, including 7.9% of those under age 18 and 5.8% of those age 65 or over.

== Education ==
Sherrelwood is served by the Westminster Public Schools.

- Sherrelwood Elementary School

== See also ==
- Front Range Urban Corridor
