= Twin Lakes, Adams County, Colorado =

Census-designated place in Adams County, CO, USA

- Census-designated place
- Location of the Twin Lakes CDP in Adams County, Colorado
- Coordinates: 39°49′23″N 104°59′52″W
- Country: United States
- State: Colorado
- County: Adams County

Government
  - Type: unincorporated community

Area
  - Total: 6.735 sq mi (17.444 km^{2})
  - Land: 6.735 sq mi (17.444 km^{2})
  - Water: 0 sq mi (0.000 km^{2})
- Elevation: 5,240 ft (1,600 m)

Population (2020)
  - Total: 8,226
  - Density: 1,221/sq mi (471.6/km^{2})
- Time zone: UTC-7 (MST)
  - Summer (DST): UTC-6 (MDT)
- ZIP Code: Denver 80221
- Area codes: 303 & 720
- GNIS feature ID: 2409373

Twin Lakes is a census-designated place (CDP) in and governed by Adams County, Colorado, United States]. The CDP is a part of the Denver–Aurora–Lakewood, CO Metropolitan Statistical Area. The population of the Twin Lakes CDP was 8,226 at the United States Census 2020. Denver post office 80221 serves the area.

== Geography ==
The Twin Lakes CDP has an area of 4,311 acres (17.444 km^{2}), all land.

== Demographics ==
Twin Lakes CDP, Colorado
Year	Pop.	±%
2000	6,301	—
2010	6,101	−3.2%
2020	8,226	+34.8%
Source: United States Census Bureau

The United States Census Bureau initially defined the Twin Lakes CDP for the United States Census 2000.

== See also ==
- List of census-designated places in Colorado
